= 2020–21 Bobsleigh World Cup =

International bobsleigh competition

Winners
- Two-man: (Germany) Francesco Friedrich (4)
- Four-man: (Germany) Francesco Friedrich (3)
- Combined men's: (Germany) Francesco Friedrich (4)
- Woman's Monobob World Series: (United States) Nicole Vogt (1)
- Two-woman: (Austria) Katrin Beierl (1)

Competitions
- Venues: 5 (8 events)

The 2020–21 Bobsleigh World Cup was a multi-race series over a season for bobsleigh. The season started on 21 November 2020 in Sigulda, Latvia and finished on Innsbruck-Igls, Austria on 31 January 2021. The season sponsor is BMW.

For the first time, competitions for women in monobob are held in the status of the World Series, but not the World Cup. The season started on 5 December 2020 in Winterberg, Germany and finished on Königssee, Germany on 20 February 2021.

== Calendar ==
Below is the schedule of the 2020/21 season.

=== Bobsleigh World Cup ===
Venue	Date	Details
(Latvia) Sigulda	21–22 November 2020	No Four-man race. Double race for Two-man.
(Latvia) Sigulda	28–29 November 2020	No Four-man race. Double race for Two-man.
(Austria) Innsbruck-Igls	12–13 December 2020	No Four-man race. Double race for Two-man.
(Austria) Innsbruck-Igls	19–20 December 2020	No Four-man race. Double race for Two-man.
(Germany) Winterberg	9–10 January 2021	also European Championships
(Switzerland) St. Moritz	16–17 January 2021	
(Germany) Königssee	23–24 January 2021	
(Austria) Innsbruck-Igls	30–31 January 2021	
(Germany) Altenberg	5–14 February 2021	World Championships (Doesn't count towards the World Cup standings)

=== Women's Monobob World Series ===
Venue	Date	Details
(Germany) Winterberg	5 December 2020	
(Austria) Innsbruck-Igls	12 December 2020	
(Austria) Innsbruck-Igls	14 January 2021	
(United States) Park City	15–17 January 2021	Triple race
(Switzerland) St. Moritz	16 January 2021	
(Germany) Königssee	23 January 2021	
(Austria) Innsbruck-Igls	30 January 2021	
(United States) Lake Placid	1–2 February 2021	Double race
(Germany) Altenberg	13–14 February 2021	World Championships
(Germany) Königssee	20 February 2021	

== Results ==
=== Two-man ===
Event:	Gold:	Time	Silver:	Time	Bronze:	Time
(Latvia) Sigulda 1-1	Francesco Friedrich; Thorsten Margis; Germany	1:39.23 (49.59 / 49.64)	Johannes Lochner; Christian Rasp; Germany	1:39.27 (49.51 / 49.76)	Michael Vogt; Sandro Michel; Switzerland	1:39.49 (49.67 / 49.82)
(Latvia) Sigulda 1-2	Francesco Friedrich; Alexander Schüller; Germany	1:39.14 (49.61 / 49.53)	Johannes Lochner; Eric Franke; Germany	1:39.35 (49.64 / 49.71)	Michael Vogt; Sandro Michel; Switzerland	1:39.79 (49.97 / 49.82)
(Latvia) Sigulda 2-1	Francesco Friedrich; Thorsten Margis; Germany	1:38.78 (49.47 / 49.31)	Oskars Ķibermanis; Matīss Miknis; Latvia	1:38.88 (49.45 / 49.43)	Simon Friedli; Gregoty Jones; Switzerland	1:39.20 (49.97 / 49.82)
(Latvia) Sigulda 2-2	Francesco Friedrich; Alexander Schüller; Germany	1:38.38 (49.19 / 49.19)	Michael Vogt; Sandro Michel; Switzerland	1:38.82 (49.43 / 49.39)	Johannes Lochner; Christian Rasp; Germany	1:38.91 (49.36 / 49.55)
(Austria) Innsbruck-Igls 1-1	Johannes Lochner; Eric Franke; Germany	1:42.93 (51.48 / 51.45)	Francesco Friedrich; Thorsten Margis; Germany	1:43.23 (51.65 / 51.58)	Oskars Ķibermanis; Matīss Miknis; Latvia	1:43.40 (51.64 / 51.76)
(Austria) Innsbruck-Igls 1-2	Francesco Friedrich; Thorsten Margis; Germany	1:43.29 (51.60 / 51.69)	Johannes Lochner; Christian Rasp; Germany	1:43.45 (51.65 / 51.80)	Oskars Ķibermanis; Matīss Miknis; Latvia	1:43.64 (51.75 / 51.89)
(Austria) Innsbruck-Igls 2-1	Francesco Friedrich; Alexander Schüller; Germany	1:42.19 (51.04 / 51.15)	Oskars Ķibermanis; Matīss Miknis; Latvia	1:42.87 (51.47 / 51.40)	Johannes Lochner; Christian Rasp; Germany	1:42.92 (51.37 / 51.55)
(Austria) Innsbruck-Igls 2-2	Francesco Friedrich; Alexander Schüller; Germany	1:42.40 (51.16 / 51.24)	Oskars Ķibermanis; Matīss Miknis; Latvia	1:43.18 (51.52 / 51.66)	Hans Peter Hannighofer; Marcel Kornhardt; Germany	1:43.30 (51.65 / 51.65)
(Austria) Innsbruck-Igls 2-2	Francesco Friedrich; Alexander Schüller; Germany	1:42.40 (51.16 / 51.24)	Oskars Ķibermanis; Matīss Miknis; Latvia	1:43.18 (51.52 / 51.66)	Johannes Lochner; Christian Rasp; Germany	1:43.30 (51.60 / 51.70)
(Germany) Winterberg	Francesco Friedrich; Thorsten Margis; Germany	1:50.08 (55.05 / 55.03)	Johannes Lochner; Eric Franke; Germany	1:50.75 (55.39 / 55.36)	Benjamin Maier; Markus Sammer; Austria	1:50.93 (55.42 / 55.51)
(Switzerland) St. Moritz	Francesco Friedrich; Alexander Schüller; Germany	2:11.92 (1:06.27 / 1:05.65)	Johannes Lochner; Florian Bauer; Germany	2:12.37 (1:06.46 / 1:05.91)	Justin Kripps; Cameron Stones; Canada	2:12.84 (1:06.66 / 1:06.18)
(Germany) Königssee	Francesco Friedrich; Thorsten Margis; Germany	1:38.69 (49.40 / 49.29)	Johannes Lochner; Eric Franke; Germany	1:38.89 (49.45 / 49.44)	Benjamin Maier; Kristian Huber; Austria	1:39.65 (49.81 / 49.84)
(Austria) Innsbruck-Igls 3	Francesco Friedrich; Alexander Schüller; Germany	1:43.08 (51.43 / 51.65)	Oskars Ķibermanis; Matīss Miknis; Latvia	1:43.80 (51.87 / 51.93)	Rostislav Gaitiukevich; Mikhail Mordasov; Russia	1:43.90 (52.01 / 51.89)

=== Four-man ===
Event:	Gold:	Time	Silver:	Time	Bronze:	Time
(Germany) Winterberg	Francesco Friedrich; Thorsten Margis; Candy Bauer; Alexander Schüller; Germany	1:48.13 (54.04 / 54.09)	Justin Kripps; Ryan Sommer; Cameron Stones; Ben Coakwell; Canada	1:48.70 (54.28 / 54.42)	Benjamin Maier; Sascha Stepan; Markus Sammer; Kristian Huber; Austria	1:48.89 (54.38 / 54.51)
(Switzerland) St. Moritz	Francesco Friedrich; Thorsten Margis; Martin Grothkopp; Alexander Schüller; Germany	2:09.56 (1:04.81 / 1:04.75)	Benjamin Maier; Dănuț Moldovan; Markus Sammer; Kristian Huber; Austria	2:09.85 (1:04.85 / 1:05.00)	Justin Kripps; Ryan Sommer; Cameron Stones; Ben Coakwell; Canada	2:10.05 (1:05.00 / 1:05.05)
(Germany) Königssee	Francesco Friedrich; Thorsten Margis; Martin Grothkopp; Alexander Schüller; Germany	1:37.45 (48.67 / 48.78)	Benjamin Maier; Dănuț Moldovan; Markus Sammer; Sascha Stepan; Austria	1:37.84 (48.98 / 48.86)	Johannes Lochner; Florian Bauer; Christopher Weber; Christian Rasp; Germany	1:37.97 (49.00 / 48.97)
(Austria) Innsbruck-Igls	Francesco Friedrich; Thorsten Margis; Alexander Schüller; Candy Bauer; Germany	1:42.08 (50.95 / 51.13)	Benjamin Maier; Sascha Stepan; Markus Sammer; Kristian Huber; Dănuț Moldovan (Note: Moldovan replaced the injured Stepan after the first heat); Austria	1:42.30 (51.12 / 51.18)	Justin Kripps; Ryan Sommer; Ben Coakwell; Cameron Stones; Canada	1:42.47 (51.18 / 51.29)

=== Women’s Monobob World Series ===
Event:	Gold:	Time	Silver:	Time	Bronze:	Time
(Germany) Winterberg	Nadezhda Sergeeva; Russia	2:00.27 (1:00.21 / 1:00.06)	Martina Fontanive; Switzerland	2:00.35 (1:00.23 / 1:00.12)	Katrin Beierl; Austria	2:00.80 (1:00.41 / 1:00.39)
(Austria) Innsbruck-Igls 1	Breeana Walker; Australia	1:51.08 (55.60 / 55.48)	Laura Nolte; Germany	1:51.52 (55.80 / 55.72)	Katrin Beierl; Austria	1:51.64 (55.83 / 55.81)
(Austria) Innsbruck-Igls 2	Melissa Lotholz; Canada	1:54.26 (57.11 / 57.15)	Cynthia Appiah; Canada	1:54.68 (57.09 / 57.59)	Karlien Sleper; Netherlands	1:54.86 (57.38 / 57.48)
(United States) Park City 1	Nicole Vogt; United States	1:48.55 (54.11 / 54.44)	Marina Silva Tuono; Brazil	1:49.70 (54.38 / 55.32)	Riley Compton; United States	1:49.94 (54.93 / 55.01)
(Switzerland) St. Moritz	Kaillie Humphries; United States	2:22.35 (1:11.26 / 1:11.09)	Laura Nolte; Germany	2:22.55 (1:11.39 / 1:11.16)	Martina Fontanive; Switzerland	2:22.64 (1:11.50 / 1:11.14)
(United States) Park City 2	Nicole Vogt; United States	1:48.24 (53.92 / 54.32)	Carrie Russell; Jamaica	1:49.18 (54.53 / 54.65)	Marina Silva Tuono; Brazil	1:49.64 (55.04 / 54.60)
(United States) Park City 3	Carrie Russell; Jamaica	1:49.08 (54.13 / 54.95)	Nicole Vogt; United States	1:49.27 (54.71 / 54.56)	Marina Silva Tuono; Brazil	1:49.83 (54.95 / 54.88)
(Germany) Königssee 1	Kaillie Humphries; United States	1:46.75 (53.36 / 53.39)	Elana Meyers Taylor; United States	1:47.37 (53.69 / 53.68)	Stephanie Schneider; Germany	1:47.50 (53.66 / 53.84)
(Austria) Innsbruck-Igls 3	Breeana Walker; Australia	1:50.84 (55.33 / 55.51)	Elana Meyers Taylor; United States	1:51.07 (55.55 / 55.52)	Melissa Lotholz; Canada	1:51.22 (55.63 / 55.59)
(United States) Lake Placid 1	Nicole Vogt; United States	1:59.18 (59.81 / 59.37)	Jazmine Fenlator-Victorian; Jamaica	1:59.71 (1:00.05 / 59.66)	Carrie Russell; Jamaica	2:00.06 (1:00.09 / 59.97)
(United States) Lake Placid 2	Nicole Vogt; United States	2:00.22 (1:00.13 / 1:00.09)	Carrie Russell; Jamaica	2:01.51 (1:00.47 / 1:01.04)	Brittany Reinbolt; United States	2:01.58 (1:00.78 / 1:00.80)
(Germany) Altenberg	Kaillie Humphries; United States	3:59.62 (1:00.39 / 1:00.17 / 59.59 / 59.47)	Stephanie Schneider; Germany	4:00.12 (1:00.07 / 1:00.45 / 59.80 / 59.80)	Laura Nolte; Germany	4:00.42 (1:00.00 / 1:00.70 / 59.61 / 1:00.11)
(Germany) Königssee 2	Martina Fontanive; Switzerland	1:48.37 (54.14 / 54.23)	none awarded		Breeana Walker; Australia	1:48.91 (54.33 / 54.58)
(Germany) Königssee 2	Melanie Hasler; Switzerland	1:48.37 (53.89 / 54.48)	none awarded		Breeana Walker; Australia	1:48.91 (54.33 / 54.58)

=== Two-woman ===
Event:	Gold:	Time	Silver:	Time	Bronze:	Time
(Latvia) Sigulda 1	Mariama Jamanka; Vanessa Mark; Germany	1:42.56 (51.05 / 51.51)	Katrin Beierl; Jennifer Onasanya; Austria	1:42.69 (51.18 / 51.51)	Kim Kalicki; Anabel Galander; Germany	1:43.14 (51.52 / 51.62)
(Latvia) Sigulda 2	Laura Nolte; Leonie Fiebig; Germany	1:42.37 (51.02 / 51.35)	Mariama Jamanka; Vanessa Mark; Germany	1:42.61 (51.04 / 51.57)	none awarded	
(Latvia) Sigulda 2	Laura Nolte; Leonie Fiebig; Germany	1:42.37 (51.02 / 51.35)	Kim Kalicki; Ann-Christin Strack; Germany	1:42.61 (51.13 / 51.48)	none awarded	
(Austria) Innsbruck-Igls 1	Laura Nolte; Deborah Levi; Germany	1:47.00 (53.65 / 53.35)	Kim Kalicki; Ann-Christin Strack; Germany	1:47.30 (53.83 / 53.47)	Mariama Jamanka; Leonie Fiebig; Germany	1:47.45 (53.90 / 53.55)
(Austria) Innsbruck-Igls 2	Stephanie Schneider; Leonie Fiebig; Germany	1:45.94 (52.94 / 53.00)	Laura Nolte; Deborah Levi; Germany	1:45.94 (52.94 / 53.00)	Kim Kalicki; Ann-Christin Strack; Germany	1:46.17 (52.94 / 53.23)
(Germany) Winterberg	Laura Nolte; Deborah Levi; Germany	1:53.60 (56.87 / 56.73)	Kim Kalicki; Ann-Christin Strack; Germany	1:54.02 (57.01 / 57.01)	Katrin Beierl; Jennifer Onasanya; Austria	1:54.39 (57.09 / 57.30)
(Germany) Winterberg	Laura Nolte; Deborah Levi; Germany	1:53.60 (56.87 / 56.73)	Kim Kalicki; Ann-Christin Strack; Germany	1:54.02 (57.01 / 57.01)	Mariama Jamanka; Leonie Fiebig; Germany	1:54.39 (57.17 / 57.22)
(Switzerland) St. Moritz	Stephanie Schneider; Leonie Fiebig; Germany	2:16.54 (1:08.55 / 1:07.99)	Elana Meyers Taylor; Sylvia Hoffmann; United States	2:16.62 (1:08.56 / 1:08.06)	Melanie Hasler; Irina Strebel; Switzerland	2:16.73 (1:08.53 / 1:08.20)
(Germany) Königssee	Kim Kalicki; Ann-Christin Strack; Germany	1:41.71 (51.07 / 50.64)	Stephanie Schneider; Tamara Seer; Germany	1:41.96 (50.97 / 50.99)	Elana Meyers Taylor; Sylvia Hoffmann; United States	1:42.17 (51.00 / 51.17)
(Austria) Innsbruck-Igls 3	Kaillie Humphries; Lolo Jones; United States	1:47.07 (53.64 / 53.43)	Elana Meyers Taylor; Lake Kwaza; United States	1:47.11 (53.55 / 53.56)	Katrin Beierl; Jennifer Onasanya; Austria	1:47.13 (53.56 / 53.57)

== Standings ==
=== Two-man ===
Pos.	Racer	(Latvia) SIG 1-1	(Latvia) SIG 1-2	(Latvia) SIG 2-1	(Latvia) SIG 2-2	(Austria) IGL 1-1	(Austria) IGL 1-2	(Austria) IGL 2-1	(Austria) IGL 2-2	(Germany) WIN	(Switzerland) STM	(Germany) KON	(Austria) IGL 3	Points
1	Francesco Friedrich (GER)	1	1	1	1	2	1	1	1	1	1	1	1	2685
2	Johannes Lochner (GER)	2	2	5	3	1	2	3	3	2	2	2	5	2453
3	Dominik Dvořák (CZE)	8	10	6	10	5	5	8	9	11	12	14	4	1880
4	Oskars Ķibermanis (LAT)	6	8	2	7	3	3	2	2	–	–	15	2	1848
5	Michael Vogt (SUI)	3	3	8	2	4	15	5	7	4	5	–	–	1794
6	Simon Friedli (SUI)	9	6	3	–	11	9	10	14	10	8	16	–	1472
7	Oskars Melbārdis (LAT)	–	–	7	4	10	10	11	6	–	6	6	12	1440
8	Christoph Hafer (GER)	4	4	4	5	6	7	–	–	8	–	7	–	1432
9	Ralfs Bērziņš (LAT)	5	5	9	6	9	8	7	10	–	16	–	–	1416
10	Rostislav Gaitiukevich (RUS)	–	–	–	–	8	4	6	5	6	9	13	3	1360

=== Four-man ===
Pos.	Racer	(Germany) WIN	(Switzerland) STM	(Germany) KON	(Austria) IGL	Points
1	Francesco Friedrich (GER)	1	1	1	1	900
2	Benjamin Maier (AUT)	3	2	2	2	830
3	Justin Kripps (CAN)	2	3	5	3	794
4	Johannes Lochner (GER)	5	4	3	4	768
5	Rostislav Gaitiukevich (RUS)	4	6	9	5	704
6	Christoph Hafer (GER)	6	9	4	9	672
7	Alexey Stulnev (RUS)	7	10	10	10	600
8	Oskars Melbārdis (LAT)	–	5	6	12	488
9	Dominik Dvořák (CZE)	9	13	12	17	488
10	Romain Heinrich (FRA)	8	12	17	18	456

=== Women’s Monobob World Series ===
Only best five results of each pilot were added up.

Pos.	Racer	(Germany) WIN	(Austria) IGL 1	(Austria) IGL 2	(United States) PAC 1	(Switzerland) STM	(United States) PAC 2	(United States) PAC 3	(Germany) KON 1	(Austria) IGL 3	(United States) LPL 1	(United States) LPL 2	(Germany) ALT	(Germany) KON 2	Points
1	Nicole Vogt (USA)	–	–	–	1	–	1	2	–	–	1	1	–	–	590
2	Breeana Walker (AUS)	–	1	–	–	7	–	–	9	1	–	–	~~DNS~~	3	502
3	Marina Silva Tuono (BRA)	–	–	–	2	–	3	3	–	–	5	4	–	–	502
4	Martina Fontanive (SUI)	2	~~DNS~~	–	–	3	–	–	8	–	–	–	9	1	488
5	Melanie Hasler (SUI)	5	4	–	–	6	–	–	–	–	–	–	10	1	468
6	Carrie Russell (JAM)	–	–	–	DSQ	–	2	1	–	–	3	2	–	–	442
7	Nadezhda Sergeeva (RUS)	1	–	–	–	~~13~~	–	–	11	5	–	–	12	5	440
8	Mica McNeill (GBR)	–	5	–	–	9	–	–	6	12	–	–	~~13~~	4	420
9	Andreea Grecu (ROM)	4	6	–	–	~~12~~	–	–	~~13~~	8	–	–	11	7	416
10	Simidele Adeagbo (NGR)	–	–	–	6	–	7	7	–	–	7	–	–	18	408

=== Two-woman ===
Pos.	Racer	(Latvia) SIG 1	(Latvia) SIG 2	(Austria) IGL 1	(Austria) IGL 2	(Germany) WIN	(Switzerland) STM	(Germany) KON	(Austria) IGL 3	Points
1	Katrin Beierl (AUT)	2	4	5	4	3	10	5	3	1506
2	Kim Kalicki (GER)	3	2	2	3	2	–	1	6	1431
3	Mariama Jamanka (GER)	1	2	3	–	3	4	6	8	1363
4	Andreea Grecu (ROM)	6	6	9	6	8	11	13	9	1248
5	Laura Nolte (GER)	DNF	1	1	2	1	6	–	–	1061
6	Melanie Hasler (SUI)	4	5	7	5	13	3	–	–	1048
7	Martina Fontanive (SUI)	8	DSQ	11	13	14	5	10	–	856
8	Breeana Walker (AUS)	–	–	8	10	9	9	12	13	856
9	Mica McNeill (GBR)	–	–	4	7	12	16	14	14	808
10	Elana Meyers Taylor (USA)	–	–	–	–	7	2	3	2	788

== Medal table ==
Rank	Nation	Gold	Silver	Bronze	Total
1	Germany	23	16	11	50
2	United States	8	5	3	16
3	Switzerland	2	2	5	9
4	Australia	2	0	1	3
5	Jamaica	1	3	1	5
6	Canada	1	2	4	7
7	Russia	1	0	1	2
8	Austria	0	4	7	11
9	Latvia	0	4	2	6
10	Brazil	0	1	2	3
11	Netherlands	0	0	1	1
Totals (11 entries)		38	37	38	113

== Points ==
Place	1	2	3	4	5	6	7	8	9	10	11	12	13	14	15	16	17	18	19	20
Women's Monobob World Series	120	110	102	96	92	88	84	80	76	72	68
2-Man, 4-Man, 2-Woman	225	210	200	192	184	176	168	160	152	144	136	128	120	112	104	96	88	80	74	68
