= 2018–19 Bobsleigh World Cup =

International bobsleigh competition

Winners
- Two-man: (Germany) Francesco Friedrich
- Four-man: (Germany) Francesco Friedrich
- Combined men's: (Germany) Francesco Friedrich
- Two-woman: (Germany) Mariama Jamanka

Competitions
- Venues: 8 (8 events)

The 2018–19 Bobsleigh World Cup was a multi-race series over a season for bobsleigh. The season started on 8 December 2018 in Sigulda, Latvia and finished on 24 February 2019 in Calgary, Canada. The World Cup was organised by the IBSF (formerly the FIBT) who also run World Cups and Championships in skeleton. The season was sponsored by BMW.

== Calendar ==
Below is the schedule of the 2018–19 season.

Venue	Date	Details
(Latvia) Sigulda	7–9 December 2018	No Four-man race. Double race for two-man.
(Germany) Winterberg	15–16 December 2018	No Two-man race. Double race for four-man.
(Germany) Altenberg	5–6 January 2019	
(Germany) Königssee	12–13 January 2019	also European Championships
(Austria) Innsbruck	19–20 January 2019	
(Switzerland) St. Moritz	26–27 January 2019	
(United States) Lake Placid	15–16 February 2019	
(Canada) Calgary	23–24 February 2019	
(Canada) Whistler	3–9 March 2019	World Championships

== Results ==
=== Two-man ===
Event:	Gold:	Time	Silver:	Time	Bronze:	Time
(Latvia) Sigulda 1	Francesco Friedrich; Alexander Schüller; Germany	1:39.97 (49.86/50.11)	Oskars Ķibermanis; Matīss Miknis; Latvia	1:40.39 (50.14/50.25)	Benjamin Maier; Markus Sammer; Austria	1:40.63 (50.11/50.54)
(Latvia) Sigulda 2	Francesco Friedrich; Martin Grothkopp; Germany	1:40.25 (50.00/50.25)	Oskars Ķibermanis; Matīss Miknis; Latvia	1:40.31 (50.02/50.29)	Christoph Hafer; Tobias Schneider; Germany	1:40.50 (50.07/50.43)
(Germany) Altenberg	Francesco Friedrich; Thorsten Margis; Germany	1:52.19 (56.38 / 55.81)	Justin Kripps; Cameron Stones; Canada	1:52.56 (56.30 / 56.26)	Oskars Ķibermanis; Matīss Miknis; Latvia	1:52.67 (56.37 / 56.30)
(Germany) Königssee	Francesco Friedrich; Martin Grothkopp; Germany	1:39.01 (49.54 / 49.47)	Justin Kripps; Cameron Stones; Canada	1:39.12 (49.51 / 49.61)	Johannes Lochner; Christian Rasp; Germany	1:39.44 (49.67 / 49.77)
(Austria) Innsbruck	Francesco Friedrich; Thorsten Margis; Germany	1:42.85 (51.39 / 51.46)	Johannes Lochner; Florian Bauer; Germany	1:43.00 (51.47 / 51.53)	Oskars Ķibermanis; Matīss Miknis; Latvia	1:43.19 (51.49 / 51.70)
(Switzerland) St. Moritz	Francesco Friedrich; Alexander Schüller; Germany	2:12.29 (1:06.24 / 1:06.05)	Johannes Lochner; Christian Rasp; Germany	2:12.69 (1:06.55 / 1:06.14)	Oskars Ķibermanis; Matīss Miknis; Latvia	2:12.80 (1:06.46 / 1:06.34)
(United States) Lake Placid	Francesco Friedrich; Thorsten Margis; Germany	1:52.35 (55.97 / 56.38)	Romain Heinrich; Dorian Hauterville; France	1:52.63 (56.12 / 56.51)	Justin Kripps; Cameron Stones; Canada	1:52.65 (56.17 / 56.48)
(Canada) Calgary	Francesco Friedrich; Thorsten Margis; Germany	1:50.84 (55.47 / 55.37)	Justin Kripps; Ryan Sommer; Canada	1:50.93 (55.51 / 55.42)	Johannes Lochner; Christopher Weber; Germany	1:51.07 (55.63 / 55.44)

=== Four-man ===
Event:	Gold:	Time	Silver:	Time	Bronze:	Time
(Germany) Winterberg 1	Nico Walther; Paul Krenz; Alexander Rödiger; Eric Franke; Germany	1:48.61 (54.24 / 54.37)	Francesco Friedrich; Alexander Schüller; Jannis Bäcker; Martin Grothkopp; Germany	1:48.68 (54.26 / 54.42)	Johannes Lochner; Christopher Weber; Florian Bauer; Christian Rasp; Germany	1:48.83 (54.48 / 54.35)
(Germany) Winterberg 2	Francesco Friedrich; Thorsten Margis; Candy Bauer; Martin Grothkopp; Germany	1:48.57 (54.37 / 54.20)	Johannes Lochner; Christian Rasp; Marc Rademacher; Christopher Weber; Germany	1:48.93 (54.39 / 54.54)	Nico Walther; Marko Hübenbecker; Alexander Rödiger; Eric Franke; Germany	1:49.03 (54.52 / 54.51)
(Germany) Altenberg	Francesco Friedrich; Martin Grothkopp; Thorsten Margis; Candy Bauer; Germany	1:48.47 (54.15 / 54.32)	Oskars Ķibermanis; Matīss Miknis; Jānis Strenga; Arvis Vilkaste; Latvia	1:48.78 (54.40 / 54.38)	Nico Walther; Paul Krenz; Alexander Rödiger; Eric Franke; Germany	1:48.98 (54.55 / 54.43)
(Germany) Königssee	Johannes Lochner; Florian Bauer; Marc Rademacher; Christian Rasp; Germany	1:37.74 (48.97 / 48.77)	Oskars Ķibermanis; Matīss Miknis; Arvis Vilkaste; Jānis Strenga; Latvia	1:37.92 (49.01 / 48.91)	Francesco Friedrich; Candy Bauer; Martin Grothkopp; Alexander Schüller; Germany	1:37.96 (49.03 / 48.93)
(Austria) Innsbruck	Francesco Friedrich; Martin Grothkopp; Thorsten Margis; Alexander Schüller; Germany	1:41.17 (50.42 / 50.75)	Oskars Ķibermanis; Matīss Miknis; Arvis Vilkaste; Jānis Strenga; Latvia	1:41.36 (50.55 / 50.81)	Johannes Lochner; Florian Bauer; Marc Rademacher; Christian Rasp; Germany	1:41.61 (50.81 / 50.80)
(Switzerland) St. Moritz	Francesco Friedrich; Alexander Schüller; Candy Bauer; Martin Grothkopp; Germany	2:10.48 (1:05.46 / 1:05.02)	Johannes Lochner; Gregor Bermbach; Christian Rasp; Florian Bauer; Germany	2:10.99 (1:05.59 / 1:05.40)	Oskars Ķibermanis; Matīss Miknis; Jānis Strenga; Helvijs Lūsis; Latvia	2:11.01 (1:05.82 / 1:05.19)
(United States) Lake Placid	Justin Kripps; Benjamin Coakwell; Ryan Sommer; Cameron Stones; Canada	1:49.54 (54.79 / 54.75)	Oskars Ķibermanis; Jānis Strenga; Arvis Vilkaste; Matīss Miknis; Latvia	1:49.61 (54.78 / 54.83)	Maksim Andrianov; Vasiliy Kondratenko; Alexey Zaitsev; Ruslan Samitov; Russia	1:49.67 (54.77 / 54.90)
(Canada) Calgary	Francesco Friedrich; Candy Bauer; Martin Grothkopp; Thorsten Margis; Germany	1:47.63 (53.60 / 54.03)	Nico Walther; Paul Krenz; Alexander Rödiger; Eric Franke; Germany	1:47.82 (53.69 / 54.13)	Johannes Lochner; Florian Bauer; Christopher Weber; Christian Rasp; Germany	1:47.84 (53.83 / 54.01)

=== Two-woman ===
Event:	Gold:	Time	Silver:	Time	Bronze:	Time
(Latvia) Sigulda	Mariama Jamanka; Annika Drazek; Germany	1:42.68 (51.28 / 51.40)	Nadezhda Sergeeva; Yulia Belomestnykh; Russia	1:43.29 (51.26 / 51.73)	Anna Köhler; Lisa Sophie Gericke; Germany	1:43.50 (51.80 / 51.70)
(Germany) Winterberg	Stephanie Schneider; Ann-Christin Strack; Germany	1:53.57 (56.87 / 56.70)	Mariama Jamanka; Annika Drazek; Germany	1:53.64 (56.79 / 56.85)	Elana Meyers Taylor; Lake Kwaza; United States	1:53.65 (56.96 / 56.69)
(Germany) Altenberg	Mariama Jamanka; Annika Drazek; Germany	1:57.25 (59.07 / 58.18)	Christine de Bruin; Kristen Bujnowski; Canada	1:57.56 (59.18 / 58.38)	Elana Meyers Taylor; Lake Kwaza; United States	1:57.64 (59.13 / 58.51)
(Germany) Königssee	Mariama Jamanka; Annika Drazek; Germany	1:41.70 (50.85 / 50.85)	Elana Meyers Taylor; Lake Kwaza; United States	1:42.06 (51.18 / 50.88)	Stephanie Schneider; Ann-Christin Strack; Germany	1:42.19 (51.17 / 51.02)
(Austria) Innsbruck	Stephanie Schneider; Ann-Christin Strack; Germany	1:46.06 (53.10 / 52.96)	Mariama Jamanka; Kira Lipperheide; Germany	1:46.17 (53.09 / 53.08)	Elana Meyers Taylor; Sylvia Hoffmann; United States	1:46.23 (53.04 / 53.19)
(Switzerland) St. Moritz	Elana Meyers Taylor; Lauren Gibbs; United States	2:16.11 (1:08.09 / 1:08.02)	Stephanie Schneider; Lisa Sophie Gericke; Germany	2:16.71 (1:08.21 / 1:08.50)	Mariama Jamanka; Franziska Bertels; Germany	2:16.87 (1:08.31 / 1:08.56)
(United States) Lake Placid	Elana Meyers Taylor; Lake Kwaza; United States	1:54.79 (57.31 / 57.48)	Christine de Bruin; Kristen Bujnowski; Canada	1:55.17 (57.34 / 57.83)	Stephanie Schneider; Deborah Levi; Germany	1:55.27 (57.20 / 58.07)
(Canada) Calgary	Mariama Jamanka; Annika Drazek; Germany	1:53.63 (56.65 / 56.98)	Elana Meyers Taylor; Lauren Gibbs; United States	1:53.94 (56.84 / 57.10)	Stephanie Schneider; Ann-Christin Strack; Germany	1:54.05 (56.96 / 57.09)

== Standings ==
=== Two-man ===
Pos.	Racer	(Latvia) SIG 1	(Latvia) SIG 2	(Germany) ALT	(Germany) KON	(Austria) IGL	(Switzerland) STM	(United States) LPL	(Canada) CGR	Points
1	Francesco Friedrich (GER)	1	1	1	1	1	1	1	1	1800
2	Oskars Ķibermanis (LAT)	2	2	3	5	3	3	5	6	1564
3	Nico Walther (GER)	6	4	4	5	–	14	4	5	1232
4	Dominik Dvořák (CZE)	4	6	13	14	5	10	17	11	1152
5	Won Yun-jong (KOR)	14	12	9	20	10	5	8	4	1140
6	Romain Heinrich (FRA)	–	–	5	4	8	9	2	8	1058
7	Maxim Andrianov (RUS)	5	5	6	8	17	17	20	17	1036
8	Justin Kripps (CAN)	–	–	2	2	4	–	3	2	1022
9	Mateusz Luty (POL)	11	11	11	7	14	7	–	10	1000
10	Johannes Lochner (GER)	–	–	DNF	3	2	2	7	3	988
11	Markus Treichl (AUT)	10	10	8	11	11	15	–	16	920
12	Ivo De Bruin (NED)	16	DNS	7	12	15	11	11	13	888
13	Michael Vogt (SUI)	18	17	–	15	12	4	12	9	872
14	Codie Bascue (USA)	9	14	17	16	17	13	9	–	808
15	Justin Olsen (USA)	17	16	19	18	17	16	14	12	762
16	Nick Poloniato (CAN)	–	–	14	9	7	–	9	7	752
17	Aleksandr Bredikhin (RUS)	12	8	12	13	21	–	16	26	730
18	Ralfs Berzins (LAT)	7	7	10	–	16	–	19	25	690
19	Brad Hall (GBR)	–	–	15	9	8	6	–	–	592
20	Benjamin Maier (AUT)	3	9	18	21	–	–	–	20	562
21	Christoph Hafer (GER)	7	3	–	–	6	–	–	–	544
22	Rudy Rinaldi (MON)	–	–	–	19	13	8	13	–	474
23	Timo Rohner (SUI)	–	–	–	17	22	18	23	24	319
24	Suk Young-jin (KOR)	–	–	–	–	20	20	15	21	302
25	Dmitriy Popov (RUS)	–	–	–	21	24	12	22	–	291
26	Alexander Kasjanov (RUS)	13	13	–	–	–	–	–	–	240
27	Pius Meyerhans (SUI)	15	15	–	–	–	–	–	–	208
28	Dražen Silić (CRO)	–	–	–	23	25	22	–	27	178
29	Chris Spring (CAN)	–	–	–	–	–	–	6	–	176
30	Geoffrey Gadbois (USA)	–	–	–	–	–	–	17	17	176

=== Four-man ===
Pos.	Racer	(Germany) WIN 1	(Germany) WIN 2	(Germany) ALT	(Germany) KON	(Austria) IGL	(Switzerland) STM	(United States) LPL	(Canada) CGR	Points
1	Francesco Friedrich (GER)	2	1	1	3	1	1	4	1	1727
2	Oskars Ķibermanis (LAT)	4	4	2	2	2	3	2	4	1616
3	Johannes Lochner (GER)	3	2	4	1	3	2	7	3	1605
4	Nico Walther (GER)	1	3	3	7	7	6	5	2	1531
5	Maxim Andrianov (RUS)	5	6	5	4	4	4	3	6	1496
6	Won Yun-jong (KOR)	12	9	7	6	12	8	6	9	1240
7	Dominik Dvořák (CZE)	7	8	6	12	5	DSQ	15	7	1088
8	Aleksandr Bredikhin (RUS)	8	7	9	11	10	–	9	15	1016
9	Markus Treichl (AUT)	10	10	8	10	8	12	–	13	1000
10	Ivo de Bruin (NED)	14	11	14	8	15	11	17	12	976

=== Two-woman ===
Pos.	Racer	(Latvia) SIG	(Germany) WIN	(Germany) ALT	(Germany) KON	(Austria) IGL	(Switzerland) STM	(United States) LPL	(Canada) CGR	Points
1	Mariama Jamanka (GER)	1	2	1	1	2	3	4	1	1712
2	Stephanie Schneider (GER)	8	1	6	3	1	2	3	3	1596
3	Elana Meyers Taylor (USA)	DSQ	3	3	2	3	1	1	2	1470
4	Nadezhda Sergeeva (RUS)	2	5	7	12	5	7	8	5	1386
5	Anna Köhler (GER)	3	4	5	7	4	4	6	–	1304
6	Brittany Reinbolt (USA)	5	11	11	14	7	11	5	5	1240
7	An Vannieuwenhuyse (BEL)	6	8	8	8	12	8	10	13	1208
8	Katrin Beierl (AUT)	7	6	9	4	6	DSQ	–	4	1056
9	Mica McNeill (GBR)	–	7	4	6	11	5	9	–	1008
10	Martine Fontanive (SUI)	DNS	10	12	10	9	9	12	11	984

== Medal table ==
Rank	Nation	Gold	Silver	Bronze	Total
1	Germany	21	9	14	44
2	United States	2	2	3	7
3	Canada	1	5	1	7
4	Latvia	0	6	4	10
5	Russia	0	1	1	2
6	France	0	1	0	1
7	Austria	0	0	1	1
Totals (7 entries)		24	24	24	72
