= 2020 in ice sports =

== Bandy ==
- March 29 – April 5: 2020 Bandy World Championship in (Russia) Irkutsk
- February 19 – 22: 2020 Women's Bandy World Championship in (Norway) Oslo
- TBD for October: 2020 Bandy World Cup (location TBA)

== Bobsleigh & Skeleton ==
=== IBSF International events and Winter Youth Olympics ===
- October 26 & 27, 2019: 2020 YOG Europe Qualification #1 in (Norway) Lillehammer
  - Men's Youth Skeleton winner: (Germany) Lukas David Nydegger (2 times)
  - Women's Youth Skeleton winner: (Germany) Josefa Schellmoser (2 times)
  - Men's Youth Monobob winners: (Germany) Alexander Czudaj (#1) / (Switzerland) Fabian Gisler (#2)
  - Women's Youth Monobob winners: (Romania) Georgeta Popescu (#1) / (Slovakia) Viktoria Cernanska (#2)
- November 7 – 9, 2019: 2020 YOG Europe Qualification #2 in (Germany) Schönau am Königsee
  - Men's Youth Skeleton winner: (Germany) Lukas David Nydegger (2 times)
  - Women's Youth Skeleton winners: (Germany) Josefa Schellmoser (#1) / (Germany) Elisabeth Schroedl (#2)
  - Men's Youth Monobob winners: (Germany) Alexander Czudaj (#1) / (Switzerland) Fabian Gisler (#2)
  - Women's Youth Monobob winners: (Romania) Georgeta Popescu (#1) / (Slovakia) Viktoria Cernanska (#2)
- November 20 & 21, 2019: 2020 YOG America Qualification #1 in (United States) Lake Placid
  - Skeleton #1 winners: (United States) James McGuire (m) / (China) Zhao Dan (f)
  - Skeleton #2 winners: (United States) James McGuire (m) / (China) Zhao Dan (f)
  - Youth Monobob #1 winners: (South Korea) Kim Jimin (m) / (Slovakia) Viktória Čerňanská (f)
  - Youth Monobob #2 winners: (South Korea) Kim Jimin (m) / (Slovakia) Viktória Čerňanská (f)
- December 7 & 8, 2019: 2020 YOG America Qualification #2 in (United States) Park City
  - Youth Monobob #1 winners: (France) Nathan Besnard (m) / (France) Camila Copain (f)
  - Youth Monobob #2 winners: (France) Nathan Besnard (m) / (France) Camila Copain (f)
  - Skeleton winners: (Japan) Taido Nagao (2 times) (m) / (China) Zhao Dan (#1) / (Canada) Hallie Clarke (#2) (f)
- December 14, 2019: 2019 IBSF Para Bobsleigh European Championships in (Germany) Oberhof
  - Para Bobsleigh winner: (United Kingdom) Corie Mapp
- January 4: IBSF European Championships 2020 (Four-man bobsleigh only) in (Germany) Winterberg
- January 19 & 20: Bobsleigh & Skeleton at the 2020 Winter Youth Olympics in (Switzerland) St. Moritz
- January 25 – February 1: IBSF Junior European Championships 2020 (Skeleton only) in (Germany) Altenberg
- January 30 – February 1: IBSF Junior & U23 European Championships 2020 (Bobsleigh only) in (Austria) Innsbruck
- February 8 & 9: IBSF Junior & U23 World Championships 2020 in (Germany) Winterberg
- February 14 – 16: IBSF European Championships 2020 in (Latvia) Sigulda
- February 21 – March 1: IBSF World Championships 2020 in (Germany) Altenberg
- March 24 & 25: 2020 IBSF Para Bobsleigh World Championship in (Norway) Lillehammer

=== 2019–20 Bobsleigh World Cup & 2019–20 Skeleton World Cup ===
- December 7 & 8, 2019: B&SWC #1 in Lake Placid #1
  - Two-man winners: Germany (Johannes Lochner & Florian Bauer)
  - Two-woman winners: United States (Kaillie Humphries & Lauren Gibbs)
  - Four-man winners: Canada (Justin Kripps, Ryan Sommer, Ben Coakwell, Cameron Stones)
  - Skeleton winners: (Germany) Axel Jungk (m) / (Germany) Jacqueline Lölling (f)
- December 14 – 15, 2019: B&SWC #2 in Lake Placid #2
  - Two-man winners: Germany (Francesco Friedrich & Alexander Schüller)
  - Two-woman winners: United States (Kaillie Humphries & Lauren Gibbs)
  - Four-man winners: Canada (Justin Kripps, Ryan Sommer, Ben Coakwell, Cameron Stones)
  - Skeleton winners: (Russia) Aleksandr Tretyakov (m) / (Russia) Elena Nikitina (f)
- January 3 – 5: B&SWC #3 in Winterberg
  - Two-woman winners: Germany (Stephanie Schneider & Kira Lipperheide)
  - Four-man winners (Race 1): Germany (Francesco Friedrich, Candy Bauer, Thorsten Margis & Alexander Schüller)
  - Four-man winners (Race 2 - European Championship): Germany (Johannes Lochner, Florian Bauer, Christopher Weber, Christian Rasp)
  - Skeleton winners: (South Korea) Yun Sung-bin (m) / (Germany) Tina Hermann (f)
- January 10 – 12: B&SWC #4 in (France) La Plagne
  - Two-man winners: Germany (Francesco Friedrich & Alexander Schüller)
  - Two-woman winners: United States (Kaillie Humphries & Lauren Gibbs)
  - Four-man winners: Germany (Francesco Friedrich, Candy Bauer, Thorsten Margis & Alexander Schüller)
  - Skeleton winners: (Russia) Aleksandr Tretyakov (m) / (Russia) Elena Nikitina (f)
- January 17 – 19: B&SWC #5 in (Austria) Innsbruck
- January 24 – 26: B&SWC #6 in (Germany) Schönau am Königsee
- January 31 – February 2: B&SWC #7 in (Switzerland) St. Moritz
- February 14 – 16: B&SWC #8 (final) in (Latvia) Sigulda

=== 2019–20 IBSF Europe Cup ===
- November 23 & 24, 2019: IEC #1 in (Norway) Lillehammer
  - 2-man Bobsleigh winners: Germany (Maximilian Illmann & Georg Fleischhauer)
  - 2-woman Bobsleigh winners: Romania (Andreea Grecu & Ioana Gheorghe)
  - 4-man Bobsleigh winners: Russia (Rostislav Gaitiukevich, Vladislav Zharovtsev, Nikolay Kozlov, Andrey Kazantsev)
- December 5 – 7, 2019: IEC #2 in Altenberg #1
  - 2-man Bobsleigh #1 winners: Germany (Richard Oelsner & Eric Strauß)
  - 2-man Bobsleigh #2 winners: Germany (Richard Oelsner & Henrik Bosse)
  - 2-woman Bobsleigh winners: Romania (Andreea Grecu & Katharina Wick)
  - 4-man Bobsleigh winners: Germany (Richard Oelsner, Henrik Bosse, Eric Strauß, Florian Paul Kunze)
- December 8, 2019: IEC #3 in (Germany) Winterberg #1
  - Skeleton winners: (Germany) Lukas David Nydegger (m) / (United Kingdom) Hannah Stevenson (f)
- December 14 & 15, 2019: IEC #4 in (Germany) Schönau am Königsee #1
  - Skeleton winners: (Germany) Felix Seibel (m) / (United Kingdom) Amelia Coltman (f)
- December 14 & 15, 2019: IEC #5 in Winterberg #2
  - 2-man Bobsleigh winners: Germany (Richard Oelsner & Henrik Bosse)
  - 2-woman Bobsleigh #1 winners: Germany (Laura Nolte & Deborah Levi)
  - 2-woman Bobsleigh #2 winners: Germany (Anna Köhler & Tamara Seer)
  - 4-man Bobsleigh #1 winners: Germany (Jonas Jannusch, Marcel Kornhardt, Tim Gessenhardt, Bastian Heber)
  - 4-man Bobsleigh #2 winners: Germany (Bennet Buchmüller, Sebastian Mrowca, Niklas Scherer, Max Pietza)
- December 20 – 22, 2019: IEC #6 in Schönau am Königsee #2
  - 2-man Bobsleigh winners: Latvia (Oskars Melbārdis & Intars Dambis)
  - 2-woman Bobsleigh winners: Romania (Andreea Grecu & Ioana Gheorghe)
  - 4-man Bobsleigh #1 winners: Germany (Jonas Jannusch, Marcel Kornhardt, Tim Gessenhardt, Bastian Heber)
  - 4-man Bobsleigh #2 winners: Germany (Jonas Jannusch, Max Neumann, Tim Gessenhardt, Bastian Heber)
- January 10 & 11: IEC #7 in (Austria) Innsbruck #1
- January 18 & 19: IEC #8 in (Latvia) Sigulda
- January 24 & 25: IEC #9 in (Germany) Altenberg #2
- January 30 – February 1: IEC #10 (final) in (Austria) Innsbruck #2

=== 2019–20 IBSF North American Cup ===
- November 18–21, 2019 NAC #1 in Lake Placid
  - 2-man Bobsleigh #1 winners: United States (Codie Bascue & Josh Williamson)
  - 2-man Bobsleigh #2 winners: Canada (Justin Kripps & Cameron Stones)
  - 2-woman Bobsleigh #1 winners: Canada (Christine de Bruin, Kristen Bujnowski, Janine McCue)
  - 2-woman Bobsleigh #2 winners: United States (Kaillie Humphries & Sylvia Hoffmann)
  - 4-man Bobsleigh #1 winners: Canada (Justin Kripps, Ben Coakwell, Cameron Stones, Ryan Sommer)
  - 4-man Bobsleigh #2 winners: Canada (Justin Kripps, Ryan Sommer, Ben Coakwell, Cameron Stones)
  - Skeleton #1 winners: (China) Geng Wenqiang (m) / (United States) Katie Uhlaender (f)
  - Skeleton #2 winners: (China) Wengang Yan (m) / (United States) Katie Uhlaender (f)
- December 9–11, 2019: NAC #2 in Park City
  - 2-man Bobsleigh #1: Canada (Austin Taylor & Teodor Kostelnik)
  - 2-woman Bobsleigh #1: United States (Kristi Koplin & Jasmine Jones)
  - 4-man Bobsleigh #1: Canada (Austin Taylor, Keefer Joyce, Mark Mlakar, Teodor Kostelnik)
  - 2-man Bobsleigh #2: Canada (Austin Taylor & Teodor Kostelnik)
  - 2-woman Bobsleigh #2: United States (Kristi Koplin & Jasmine Jones)
  - 4-man Bobsleigh #2: Canada (Austin Taylor, Keefer Joyce, Mark Mlakar, Teodor Kostelnik)
  - 2-man Bobsleigh #3: Canada (Austin Taylor & Mark Mlakar)
  - 2-woman Bobsleigh #3: United States (Kristi Koplin & Jasmine Jones)
  - 4-man Bobsleigh #3: Canada (Austin Taylor, Keefer Joyce, Mark Mlakar, Teodor Kostelnik, Mike Evelyn)
  - Skeleton #1 winners: (American Samoa) Nathan Crompton & (China) Haifeng Zhu (m) / (China) Yangqi Zhu (f)
  - Skeleton #2 winners: (American Samoa) Nathan Crompton (m) / (China) Yangqi Zhu (f)
  - Skeleton #3 winners: (American Samoa) Nathan Crompton (m) / (China) Yangqi Zhu (f)

=== 2019–20 IBSF Intercontinental Cup ===
- November 23 & 24, 2019: Intercontinental Cup #1 in (Russia) Sochi
  - Skeleton #1 winners: (Germany) Christopher Grotheer (m) / (Germany) Susanne Kreher (f)
  - Skeleton #2 winners: (United Kingdom) Marcus Wyatt (m) / (Germany) Susanne Kreher (f)
- December 7, 2019: Intercontinental Cup #2 in (Germany) Winterberg
  - Skeleton winners: (Germany) Christopher Grotheer (m) / (Germany) Susanne Kreher (f)
- December 14 & 15, 2019: Intercontinental Cup #3 in (Germany) Schönau am Königsee
  - Skeleton #1 winners: (Germany) Martin Rosenberger (m) / (Germany) Hannah Neise (f)
  - Skeleton #2 winners: (Italy) Amedeo Bagnis (m) / (Latvia) Endija Tērauda (f)

=== 2019–20 IBSF Para Bobsleigh World Cup ===
- December 7 & 8, 2019: PBWC #1 in (Norway) Lillehammer
  - Para Bobsleigh #1 winner: (Canada) Lonnie Bissonnette
  - Para Bobsleigh #2 winner: (United Kingdom) Corie Mapp
- December 13 & 14, 2019: PBWC #2 in (Germany) Oberhof
  - Para Bobsleigh #1 winner: (United Kingdom) Corie Mapp
  - Para Bobsleigh #2 winner: (United Kingdom) Corie Mapp
- January 24 & 25: PBWC #3 in (Switzerland) St. Moritz
- February 6 & 7: PBWC #4 in (United States) Lake Placid
- February 15 & 16: PBWC #5 (final) in (United States) Park City

=== 2019–20 IBSF Women's Monobob Events ===
- November 18, 2019: WME #1 in (United States) Lake Placid #1
  - Women's Monobob winner: (Canada) Cynthia Appiah
- November 20, 2019: WME #2 in (Norway) Lillehammer
  - Women's Monobob winner: (Russia) Anastasiia Makarova
- December 19, 2019: WME #3 in (Germany) Schönau am Königsee
  - Women's Monobob winner: (China) Ying King
- February 15 & 16: WME #4 in (United States) Park City
- March 7 & 8: WME #5 in (France) La Plagne
- April 3: WME #6 (final) in (United States) Lake Placid #2

== Curling ==
=== 2019–20 International curling championships and Winter Youth Olympics ===
- October 12 – 19, 2019: 2019 World Mixed Curling Championship in (Scotland) Aberdeen
  - Canada (Skip: Colin Kurz) defeated Germany (Skip: Andy Kapp), 6–5, to win Canada's second consecutive World Mixed Curling Championship title.
  - Norway (Skip: Ingvild Skaga) took third place.
- November 2 – 9, 2019: 2019 Pacific-Asia Curling Championships in Shenzhen
  - Men: South Korea (Skip: Kim Chang-min) defeated Japan (Skip: Yuta Matsumura), 11–2, to win South Korea's fourth Men's Pacific-Asia Curling Championships title.
    - China (Skip: Zou Qiang) took third place.
  - Women: China (Skip: Han Yu) defeated Japan (Skip: Seina Nakajima), 10–3, to win China's eighth Women's Pacific-Asia Curling Championships title.
    - South Korea (Skip: Gim Un-chi) took third place.
- November 16 – 23, 2019: 2019 European Curling Championships in Helsingborg
  - Men: Sweden (Skip: Niklas Edin) defeated Switzerland (Skip: Yannick Schwaller), 9–3, to win Sweden's 11th Men's European Curling Championships title.
    - Scotland (Skip: Ross Paterson) took third place.
  - Women: Sweden (Skip: Anna Hasselborg) defeated Scotland (Skip: Eve Muirhead), 5–4, to win Sweden's 21st Women's European Curling Championships title.
    - Switzerland (Skip: Silvana Tirinzoni) took third place.
- November 28 – 30, 2019: 2019 Americas Challenge in Eveleth
  - Men: Champion: United States (Skip: Rich Ruohonen); Second: Mexico (Skip: Ramy Cohen Masri); Third: Brazil (Skip: Michael Krahenbuhl)
  - Women: Champion: United States (Skip: Tabitha Peterson); Second: Mexico (Skip: Adriana Camarena Osorno); Third: Brazil (Skip: Anne Shibuya)
- December 2 – 7, 2019: 2019 World Mixed Doubles Qualification Event in (Scotland) Howwood
  - China, Germany, Italy, South Korea all qualified for the 2020 World Mixed Doubles Curling Championship.
- January 10 – 22: 2020 Winter Youth Olympics in (Switzerland) Lausanne
  - Mixed team: Norway (Skip: Lukas Høstmælingen) defeated Japan (Skip: Takumi Maeda), 5–4 to win the first Youth Olympic Games Curling Medal.
    - Russia (Skip: Valeriia Denisenko) took third place.
  - Mixed doubles: Laura Nagy (HUN) / Nathan Young (CAN) defeated Chana Beitone (FRA) / Nikolai Lysakov (RUS), 9–5 to win the first Youth Olympic Games Mixed doubles Curling Medal.
    - Pei Junhang (CHN) / Vít Chabičovský (CZE) took third place.
- January 13 – 18: 2020 World Qualification Event in (Finland) Lohja
  - China, Russia both qualified for the 2020 World Men's Curling Championship. South Korea, Italy both qualified for the 2020 World Women's Curling Championship.
- February 15 – 22: 2020 World Junior Curling Championships in Krasnoyarsk
  - Men: Canada (Skip: Jacques Gauthier) defeated Switzerland (Skip: Marco Hösli), 7–2, to win Canada's 3rd consecutive and 21st overall Men's World Junior Curling Championships title.
    - Scotland (Skip: James Craik) took third place.
  - Women: Canada (Skip: Mackenzie Zacharias) defeated South Korea (Skip: Kim Min-ji), 7–5, to win Canada's 13th Women's World Junior Curling Championships title.
    - Russia (Skip: Vlada Rumiantseva) took third place.
- February 29 – March 7: 2020 World Wheelchair Curling Championship in (Switzerland) Wetzikon
  - Russia (Skip: Konstantin Kurokhtin) defeated Canada (Skip: Mark Ideson), 5–4, to win Russia's 4th World Wheelchair Curling Championship title.
    - Sweden (Skip: Viljo Petersson-Dahl) took third place.
- March 14 – 22: 2020 World Women's Curling Championship in (Canada) Prince George
  - Cancelled due to COVID-19 pandemic
- March 28 – April 5: 2020 World Men's Curling Championship in (Scotland) Glasgow
- April 18 – 25: 2020 World Mixed Doubles & Senior Curling Championships in (Canada) Kelowna

=== 2019–20 World Curling Tour and Grand Slam of Curling ===
- June 15, 2019 – May 3, 2020: 2019–20 World Curling Tour and Grand Slam of Curling Seasons
  - October 22 – 27, 2019: 2019 Masters in (Ontario) North Bay
    - Men: Team Matt Dunstone defeated Team (Newfoundland and Labrador) Brad Gushue, 8–5, to win Saskatchewan's second Men's Masters title.
    - Women: Team Tracy Fleury defeated Team (Japan) Sayaka Yoshimura, 7–5, to win Manitoba's second Women's Masters title.
  - November 5 – 10, 2019: 2019 Tour Challenge in (Nova Scotia) Pictou County
    - Men: Team Brad Jacobs defeated Team (Newfoundland and Labrador) Brad Gushue, 6–4, to win Ontario's second consecutive Men's Tour Challenge title.
    - Women: Team Anna Hasselborg defeated Team (Manitoba) Kerri Einarson, 8–5, to win Sweden's first Women's Tour Challenge title.
  - December 10 – 15, 2019: 2019 National in (Newfoundland and Labrador) Conception Bay South
    - Men: Team (Ontario) Brad Jacobs defeated (Sweden) Niklas Edin, 3–1.
    - Women: Team (Sweden) Anna Hasselborg defeated (Manitoba) Jennifer Jones, 7–3.
  - January 14 – 19: 2020 Canadian Open in (Saskatchewan) Yorkton
    - Men: Team (Ontario) Brad Jacobs defeated (Ontario) John Epping, 6–5.
    - Women: Team (Sweden) Anna Hasselborg defeated (South Korea) Kim Min-ji, 7–5.
  - April 7 – 12: 2020 Players' Championship in (Ontario) Toronto
    - Cancelled due to COVID-19 pandemic
  - April 29 – May 3: 2020 Champions Cup in (Alberta) Olds
    - Cancelled due to COVID-19 pandemic

=== 2019–20 Curling Canada Season of Champions events ===
- November 27 – December 1, 2019: 2019 Canada Cup in (Alberta) Leduc
  - Men: (Ontario) John Epping defeated (Alberta) Kevin Koe, 7–4.
  - Women: (Ontario) Rachel Homan defeated (Manitoba) Tracy Fleury, 9–4.
- January 9 – 12: 2020 Continental Cup in (Ontario) London
  - (European Union) Team World defeated Team Canada, 37.5–22.5 points, to win their second consecutive and sixth Continental Cup title.
- January 18 – 26: 2020 Canadian Junior Curling Championships in (British Columbia) Langley
  - Men: Manitoba 2 (Skip: Jacques Gauthier) defeated Newfoundland and Labrador (Skip: Daniel Bruce), 8–6.
  - Women: Manitoba (Skip: Mackenzie Zacharias) defeated Alberta (Skip: Abby Marks), 10–3.
- February 15 – 23: 2020 Scotties Tournament of Hearts in (Saskatchewan) Moose Jaw
  - Manitoba (Skip: Kerri Einarson) defeated Ontario (Skip: Rachel Homan), 8–7 to win Manitoba's record tying 11th Canadian Women's Curling Championship.
    - (Manitoba) Wild Card (Skip: Jennifer Jones) took third place.
- February 28 – March 8: 2020 Tim Hortons Brier in (Ontario) Kingston
  - Newfoundland and Labrador (Skip: Brad Gushue) defeated Alberta (Skip: Brendan Bottcher), 7–3 to win Newfoundland and Labrador's 3rd Canadian Men's Curling Championship.
    - Saskatchewan (Skip: Matt Dunstone) took third place.

== Ice hockey ==
=== Main world ice hockey championships ===
- December 26, 2019 – January 2: 2020 IIHF World Women's U18 Championship in Bratislava
  - The United States defeated Canada, 2–1 in overtime, to win their eighth World Women's U18 Championship title.
  - Russia defeated Finland, 6–1, to win the bronze medal.
  - Slovakia was relegated to Division I – Group A for 2021.
- December 26, 2019 – January 5: 2020 World Junior Ice Hockey Championships in (Czech Republic) Ostrava and Třinec
  - Canada defeated Russia, 4–3, to win their 18th World Junior Ice Hockey Championship title.
  - Sweden defeated Finland, 3–2, to win the bronze medal.
  - Kazakhstan was relegated to Division I – Group A for 2021.
- March 31 – April 10: ~~2020 IIHF Women's World Championship in (Canada) Halifax and Truro~~
  - Note: The Top Division, Division I – Groups A & B, and Division II – Group A tournaments were cancelled due to the coronavirus pandemic.
- April 16 – 26: 2020 IIHF World U18 Championships in (United States) Plymouth and Ann Arbor
- May 8 – 24: 2020 IIHF World Championship in (Switzerland) Zürich and Lausanne

=== 2020 world ice hockey divisions ===
- December 9, 2019 – May 3: 2020 World Ice Hockey Divisions

2020 IIHF Ice Hockey World Championships

- March 3 – 5: ~~Division IV in (Kyrgyzstan) Bishkek~~
  - Note: The Division IV tournament was cancelled due to the coronavirus pandemic.
- April 19 – 25: Division II – Group A in (Croatia) Zagreb
- April 19 – 25: Division II – Group B in (Iceland) Reykjavík
- April 19 – 25: Division III – Group A in (Luxembourg) Kockelscheuer
- April 20 – 23: Division III – Group B in (South Africa) Cape Town
- April 27 – May 3: Division I – Group A in (Slovenia) Ljubljana
- April 27 – May 3: Division I – Group B in (Poland) Katowice

2020 IIHF World U20 Championship (Junior)

- December 9 – 15, 2019: Division I – Group A in Minsk
  - Final Ranking: 1. Austria, 2. Latvia, 3. Belarus, 4. Norway, 5. Denmark, 6. Slovenia
  - Austria was promoted to Top Division for 2021.
  - Slovenia was relegated to Division I – Group B for 2021.
- December 12 – 18, 2019: Division I – Group B in Kyiv
  - Final Ranking: 1. Hungary, 2. France, 3. Ukraine, 4. Poland, 5. Estonia, 6. Italy
  - Hungary was promoted to Division I – Group A for 2021.
  - Italy was relegated to Division II – Group A for 2021.
- January 6 – 12: Division II – Group A in Vilnius
  - Final Ranking: 1. Japan, 2. Great Britain, 3. Lithuania, 4. Romania, 5. Spain, 6. Serbia
  - Japan was promoted to Division I – Group B for 2021.
  - Serbia was relegated to Division II – Group B for 2021.
- January 13 – 19: Division III in Sofia
  - Final Ranking: 1. Iceland, 2. Australia, 3. Turkey, 4. Mexico, 5. Bulgaria, 6. New Zealand, 7. Chinese Taipei, 8. South Africa
  - Iceland was promoted to Division II – Group B for 2021.
- January 28 – February 3: Division II – Group B in Gangneung
  - Final Ranking: 1. South Korea, 2. Netherlands, 3. China, 4. Croatia, 5. Belgium, 6. Israel
  - South Korea was promoted to Division II – Group A for 2021.
  - Israel was relegated to Division III for 2021.

2020 IIHF World U18 Championship

Note: The Division II – Groups A & B, and Division III – Groups A & B tournaments were cancelled due to the coronavirus pandemic.

- March 16 – 22: ~~Division III – Group A in (Turkey) Istanbul~~
- March 22 – 28: ~~Division II – Group A in (Estonia) Tallinn~~
- March 23 – 29: ~~Division II – Group B in (Bulgaria) Sofia~~
- March 29 – April 4: ~~Division III – Group B in (Luxembourg) Kockelscheuer~~
- April 12 – 18: Division I – Group B in (Italy) Asiago
- April 13 – 19: Division I – Group A in (Slovakia) Spišská Nová Ves

2020 IIHF Women's World Championship

Note: The Top Division, Division I – Groups A & B, and Division II – Group A tournaments were cancelled due to the coronavirus pandemic.

- December 4 – 10, 2019: Division III in Sofia
  - Final Ranking: 1. South Africa, 2. Belgium, 3. Romania, 4. Bulgaria, 5. Lithuania, 6. Hong Kong
  - South Africa was promoted to Division II – Group B for 2021.
- February 23 – 29: Division II – Group B in Akureyri
  - Final Ranking: 1. Australia, 2. Iceland, 3. New Zealand, 4. Turkey, 5. Croatia, 6. Ukraine
  - Ukraine was relegated to Division III for 2021.
  - Note: No promotion to Division II – Group A for 2021 because the 2020 Division II – Group A tournament was cancelled due to the coronavirus pandemic.
- March 28 – April 3: ~~Division I – Group B in (Poland) Katowice~~
- March 29 – April 4: ~~Division II – Group A in (Spain) Jaca~~
- April 12 – 18: ~~Division I – Group A in (France) Angers~~

2020 IIHF World Women's U18 Championship

- January 2 – 8: Division I – Group B in Katowice
  - Final Ranking: 1. Norway, 2. Austria, 3. China, 4. South Korea, 5. Poland, 6. Great Britain
  - Norway was promoted to Division I – Group A for 2021.
  - Great Britain was relegated to Division II – Group A for 2021.
- January 3 – 9: Division I – Group A in Füssen
  - Final Ranking: 1. Germany, 2. Japan, 3. Hungary, 4. France, 5. Italy, 6. Denmark
  - Germany was promoted to Top Division for 2021.
  - Denmark was relegated to Division I – Group B for 2021.
- January 25 – 28: Division II – Group A in Eindhoven
  - Final Ranking: 1. Chinese Taipei, 2. Netherlands, 3. Australia, 4. Kazakhstan
  - Chinese Taipei was promoted to Division I – Group B for 2021.
  - Kazakhstan was relegated to Division II – Group B for 2021.
- January 28 – February 2: Division II – Group B in Mexico City
  - Final Ranking: 1. Spain, 2. Turkey, 3. Mexico, 4. New Zealand
  - Spain was promoted to Division II – Group A for 2021.

=== National Hockey League (NHL) ===
- October 2, 2019 – March 12: 2019–20 NHL season
  - Note: The NHL suspended the season due to the coronavirus pandemic.
- October 26, 2019: 2019 Heritage Classic at Mosaic Stadium in (Saskatchewan) Regina
  - The (Manitoba) Winnipeg Jets defeated the (Alberta) Calgary Flames, with the score of 2–1 in overtime.
- January 1: 2020 Winter Classic at Cotton Bowl in (Texas) Dallas
  - The (Texas) Dallas Stars defeated the (Tennessee) Nashville Predators, with the score of 4–2.
- January 25: 2020 All-Star Game at Enterprise Center in (Missouri) St. Louis
  - Elite Women's 3-on-3 Game: The Canadian All-Stars defeated the American All-Stars, with the score of 2–1.
  - All-Star Game: Team Pacific defeated Team Atlantic, with the score of 5–4.
  - All-Star Game MVP: (Czech Republic) David Pastrňák ( (Massachusetts) Boston Bruins)
  - Accuracy Shooting: (Colorado) Jaccob Slavin ( (North Carolina) Carolina Hurricanes)
  - Fastest Skater: (British Columbia) Mathew Barzal ( (New York (state)) New York Islanders)
  - Hardest Shot: (British Columbia) Shea Weber ( (Quebec) Montreal Canadiens)
  - Save Streak: (Ontario) Jordan Binnington ( (Missouri) St. Louis Blues)
  - Shooting Stars: (New York (state)) Patrick Kane ( (Illinois) Chicago Blackhawks)
- February 15: 2020 Stadium Series at Falcon Stadium in Colorado Springs
  - The (California) Los Angeles Kings defeated the Colorado Avalanche, with the score of 3–1.
- June 26 – 27: 2020 NHL entry draft at Bell Centre in (Quebec) Montreal

=== Kontinental Hockey League (KHL) ===
- September 1, 2019 – February 27: 2019–20 KHL season
  - Note: The KHL cancelled the playoffs due to the coronavirus pandemic.

=== North America (ice hockey) ===
==== United States (AHL/ECHL/USHL) ====
- October 4, 2019 – March 12: 2019–20 AHL season
  - Note: The AHL suspended the season due to the coronavirus pandemic.
- October 11, 2019 – March 12: 2019–20 ECHL season
  - Note: The ECHL suspended the season due to the coronavirus pandemic.
- TBA: 2019–20 USHL season

==== Junior (OHL/QMJHL/WHL) ====
- September 19, 2019 – March 17: 2019–20 QMJHL season
  - Note: The QMJHL cancelled the season due to the coronavirus pandemic.
- September 19, 2019 – March 18: 2019–20 OHL season
  - Note: The OHL cancelled the season due to the coronavirus pandemic.
- September 20, 2019 – March 18: 2019–20 WHL season
  - Note: The WHL cancelled the season due to the coronavirus pandemic.
- May 22 – 31: ~~2020 Memorial Cup at Prospera Place in (British Columbia) Kelowna~~
  - Note: The Memorial Cup was cancelled due to the coronavirus pandemic.

==== College (USA–NCAA–Division I) ====
- March 27 – April 11: 2020 NCAA Division I Men's Ice Hockey Tournament (Frozen Four at Little Caesars Arena in (Michigan) Detroit)
- TBA: 2020 NCAA National Collegiate Women's Ice Hockey Tournament (Frozen Four at Agganis Arena in (Massachusetts) Boston)

==== College (Canada–U Sports) ====
- TBA: 2020 U Sports University Cup Tournament at Scotiabank Centre in (Nova Scotia) Halifax

==== Women (NWHL) ====
- October 19, 2019 – March 1: 2019–20 NWHL season
  - Note: The NWHL cancelled the Isobel Cup Championship due to the coronavirus pandemic.

=== Europe (ice hockey) ===
- August 29, 2019 – February 4: 2019–20 Champions Hockey League
  - (Sweden) Frölunda HC defeated (Czech Republic) Mountfield HK, 3–1, to win their second consecutive and fourth Champions Hockey League title.
  - (Sweden) Djurgårdens IF and (Sweden) Luleå HF finished in joint third place, as the losing semi-finalists.
- September 20, 2019 – January 12: 2019–20 IIHF Continental Cup
  - Final Ranking: 1. (Denmark) SønderjyskE Ishockey, 2. (United Kingdom) Nottingham Panthers, 3. (Belarus) HC Neman Grodno, 4. (Poland) KS Cracovia

=== Asia (ice hockey) ===
- August 31, 2019 – February 16: 2019–20 Asia League Ice Hockey season
  - Note: The league cancelled the finals due to the coronavirus pandemic.
- December 1 – 8 2019: 2019 Southeast Asian Games in Pasay, Metro Manila
  - (gold) Thailand; (silver) Singapore; (bronze) Philippines
  - Thailand defeated Singapore, 8–0, to win their first SEA Games gold medal. Singapore took the silver medal. The Philippines defeated Malaysia, 17–1, to win the bronze medal.
- April 27 – May 1: 2020 IIHF Challenge Cup of Asia in Singapore
  - Note: The Women's and Men's U20 tournaments were cancelled due to the coronavirus pandemic.

== Luge ==
=== 2020 Winter Youth Olympics (Luge) ===
- January 17 – 20: Luge at the 2020 Winter Youth Olympics in (Switzerland) St. Moritz

=== 2019–20 International luge events ===
- November 21 & 22, 2019: 2019 Junior America-Pacific Luge Championships in (United States) Park City
  - Winners: (United States) Sean Hollander (m) / (Canada) Sam Judson (f)
- December 13 & 14, 2019: 2019 America-Pacific Luge Championships in Whistler
  - Winners: (United States) Tucker West (m) / (United States) Emily Sweeney (f)
  - Doubles winners: Canada (Justin Snith & Tristan Walker)
- January 18 & 19: 2020 FIL European Luge Championships in (Norway) Lillehammer
- January 31 – February 2: FIL Junior World Luge Natural Track Championships 2020 in (Austria) Saint Sebastian
- February 1 & 2: 2020 FIL Junior European Luge Championships in (Germany) Winterberg
- February 15 & 16: 2020 FIL World Luge Championships in (Russia) Sochi
- February 21 & 22: FIL Junior World Luge Championships 2020 in (Germany) Oberhof
- February 21 – 23: FIL World Luge Natural Track Championships 2020 in (Russia) Moscow

=== 2019–20 Luge World Cup ===
- November 23 & 24, 2019: LWC #1 in (Austria) Innsbruck
  - Winners: (Austria) Jonas Müller (m) / (Russia) Tatiana Ivanova (f)
  - Doubles winners: Germany (Toni Eggert & Sascha Benecken)
- November 30 & December 1, 2019: LWC #2 in (United States) Lake Placid
  - Winners: (Austria) Jonas Müller (m) / (Germany) Julia Taubitz (f)
  - Doubles winners: Germany (Tobias Wendl & Tobias Arlt)
- December 13 & 14, 2019: LWC #3 in (Canada) Whistler
  - Winners: (Russia) Roman Repilov (m) / (Russia) Tatiana Ivanova (f)
  - Doubles winners: Germany (Toni Eggert & Sascha Benecken)
- January 11 & 12: LWC #4 in (Germany) Altenberg
- January 18 & 19: LWC #5 in (Norway) Lillehammer
- January 25 & 26: LWC #6 in (Latvia) Sigulda
- February 1 & 2: LWC #7 in (Germany) Oberhof
- February 29 & March 1: LWC #8 (final) in (Germany) Schönau am Königsee

=== 2019–20 Team Relay Luge World Cup ===
- November 23 & 24, 2019: TRLWC #1 in (Austria) Innsbruck
  - Team relay winners: Italy (Andrea Vötter, Dominik Fischnaller, Ivan Nagler & Fabian Malleier)
- January 11 & 12: TRLWC #2 in (Germany) Altenberg
- January 18 & 19: TRLWC #3 in (Norway) Lillehammer
- February 1 & 2: TRLWC #4 in (Germany) Oberhof
- February 22 & 23: TRLWC #5 in (Germany) Winterberg
- February 29 & March 1: TRLWC #6 (final) in (Germany) Schönau am Königsee

=== 2019–20 Sprint Luge World Cup ===
- November 30 – December 1, 2019: SLWC #1 in (United States) Lake Placid
  - Winners: (Russia) Roman Repilov (m) / (Germany) Julia Taubitz (f)
  - Doubles winners: Latvia (Andris Šics & Juris Šics)
- December 13 & 14, 2019: SLWC #2 in (Canada) Whistler
  - Winners: (Austria) Reinhard Egger (m) / (Russia) Tatiana Ivanova (f)
  - Doubles winners: Germany (Toni Eggert & Sascha Benecken)
- January 25 & 26: SLWC #3 (final) in (Latvia) Sigulda

=== 2019–20 Natural Track Luge World Cup ===
- January 3 – 5: NTLWC #1 in (Austria) Obdach-Winterleiten
- January 9 – 12: NTLWC #2 in (Italy) Passeiertal
- January 17 – 19: NTLWC #3 in (Romania) Vatra Dornei
- January 24 – 26: NTLWC #4 in (Italy) Deutschnofen
- February 7 – 9: NTLWC #5 in (Slovenia) Železniki
- February 13 – 15: NTLWC #6 (final) in (Austria) Umhausen

== Speed skating ==
June 18 - In Germany Matthias Grosse is appointed as president of the national German speed skating association, Deutsche Eisschnelllauf-Gemeinschaft (DESG) until September 2020. This is seen by media as controversial as partner of drug banned speed skater Claudia Pechstein.

== Short track speed skating ==
June — During a training camp in France, the Dutch Lara van Ruijven hospitalized in intensive care due to an immune system disorder. Her situation became critical and was fighting for her life.

== See also ==
- 2020 in skiing
- 2020 in sports
