= IBSF World Championships 2017 – Four-man =

Four-man at the IBSF World Championships 2017
- Venue: Königssee bobsleigh, luge, and skeleton track
- Location: Königssee, Germany
- Dates: 25–26 February
- Competitors: 136 from 34 nations
- Teams: 34
- Winning time: 3:14.10

Medalists
gold medal	Francesco Friedrich; Candy Bauer; Martin Grothkopp; Thorsten Margis	Germany
gold medal	Johannes Lochner; Matthias Kagerhuber; Joshua Bluhm; Christian Rasp	Germany
bronze medal	Nico Walther; Kevin Kuske; Kevin Korona; Eric Franke	Germany

The Four-man competition at the 2017 World Championships was held on 25 and 26 February 2017.

== Results ==
The first two runs were held on 25 February 2017 and the last two runs on 26 February 2017.

Rank	Bib	Country	Run 1	Rank	Run 2	Rank	Run 3	Rank	Run 4	Rank	Total	Behind
1st place, gold medalist(s)	11	Germany	48.39	2	48.46	1	48.60	1	48.65	4	3:14.10	
1st place, gold medalist(s)	6	Germany	48.26	1	48.56	6	48.64	3	48.64	3	3:14.10	
3rd place, bronze medalist(s)	10	Germany	48.48	4	48.54	4	48.63	2	48.61	2	3:14.26	+0.16
4	17	Latvia	48.42	3	48.50	2	48.91	7	48.56	1	3:14.39	+0.29
5	12	United States	48.49	5	48.51	3	48.66	4	48.78	5	3:14.44	+0.34
6	16	Canada	48.49	5	48.62	10	48.88	5	48.88	6	3:14.87	+0.77
7	9	Austria	48.53	9	48.59	7	48.90	6	48.88	6	3:14.90	+0.80
8	15	Russia	48.60	11	48.55	5	48.93	8	48.99	12	3:15.07	+0.97
9	13	Russia	48.51	8	48.71	12	48.97	10	48.91	8	3:15.10	+1.00
10	14	Latvia	48.68	12	48.59	7	48.96	9	48.93	9	3:15.16	+1.06
11	25	United States	48.72	15	48.61	9	49.01	12	48.96	10	3:15.30	+1.20
12	8	Russia	48.49	5	48.77	14	49.07	16	49.07	16	3:15.40	+1.30
13	18	Canada	48.84	19	48.74	13	49.02	13	49.01	13	3:15.61	+1.51
14	20	France	48.71	14	48.83	17	48.98	11	49.10	17	3:15.62	+1.52
15	7	Switzerland	48.56	10	48.91	18	49.03	14	49.17	19	3:15.67	+1.57
16	4	Austria	48.75	16	48.80	15	49.13	18	49.01	13	3:15.69	+1.59
17	22	United States	48.82	18	48.81	16	49.08	17	49.02	15	3:15.73	+1.63
18	23	Czech Republic	48.77	17	48.70	11	49.24	20	49.10	17	3:15.81	+1.71
19	26	Monaco	48.92	21	48.97	19	49.06	15	48.98	11	3:15.93	+1.83
20	21	Germany	48.91	20	48.98	20	49.36	25	49.26	20	3:16.51	+2.41
21	19	Great Britain	49.00	23	49.04	21	49.32	21	DNQ			
22	24	Switzerland	49.07	24	49.04	21	49.32	21	DNQ			
23	3	Canada	48.93	22	49.28	26	49.23	19	DNQ			
24	30	Italy	49.17	27	49.09	23	49.32	21	DNQ			
25	27	Czech Republic	49.13	25	49.29	27	49.34	24	DNQ			
26	2	Netherlands	49.16	26	49.27	25	49.54	27	DNQ			
27	29	Italy	49.28	28	49.23	24	49.49	26	DNQ			
28	32	Poland	49.53	32	49.54	29	49.75	28	DNQ			
29	33	Croatia	49.48	31	49.53	28	49.82	29	DNQ			
30	1	Romania	49.43	29	49.61	30	50.01	31	DNQ			
31	5	Norway	49.43	29	49.74	31	49.90	30	DNQ			
32	34	Romania	50.48	34	50.50	32	50.46	32				
—	28	Great Britain	48.70	13	DNF							
—	31	Serbia	49.78	33	DNS							
