= IBSF World Championships 2017 – Mixed team =

Mixed team at the IBSF World Championships 2017
- Venue: Königssee bobsleigh, luge, and skeleton track
- Location: Königssee, Germany
- Dates: 19 February
- Competitors: 72
- Teams: 12
- Winning time: 3:21.84

Medalists
gold medal	Axel Jungk; Mariama Jamanka; Franziska Bertels; Jacqueline Lölling; Johannes Lochner; Christian Rasp	Germany
silver medal	Christopher Grotheer; Stephanie Schneider; Lisa-Marie Buckwitz; Tina Hermann; Nico Walther; Philipp Wobeto	Germany
bronze medal	(Germany) Alexander Gassner (Romania) Maria Constantin (Romania) Andreea Grecu (Germany) Anna Fernstädt (Germany) Richard Ölsner (Germany) Marc Rademacher

The Mixed team competition at the 2017 World Championships was held on 19 February 2017.

First introduced at the 2007 championships, the mixed team event consists of one run each of men's skeleton, women's skeleton, 2-man bobsleigh, and 2-women bobsleigh.

== Results ==
The runs were started at 14:55.

Rank	Bib	Country	Total	Behind
1st place, gold medalist(s)	11	Germany	3:21.84	
2nd place, silver medalist(s)	10	Germany	3:22.44	+0.60
3rd place, bronze medalist(s)	7	International	3:22.69	+0.85
4	1	Russia	3:22.82	+0.98
5	6	Russia	3:23.04	+1.20
6	5	United States	3:23.43	+1.59
7	3	Austria	3:23.72	+1.88
8	9	Canada	3:23.80	+1.96
9	12	Canada	3:23.92	+2.08
10	4	United States	3:24.39	+2.55
11	2	International	3:25.49	+3.65
12	8	International	3:26.88	+5.04
