= Christina Hengster =

Austrian bobsledder

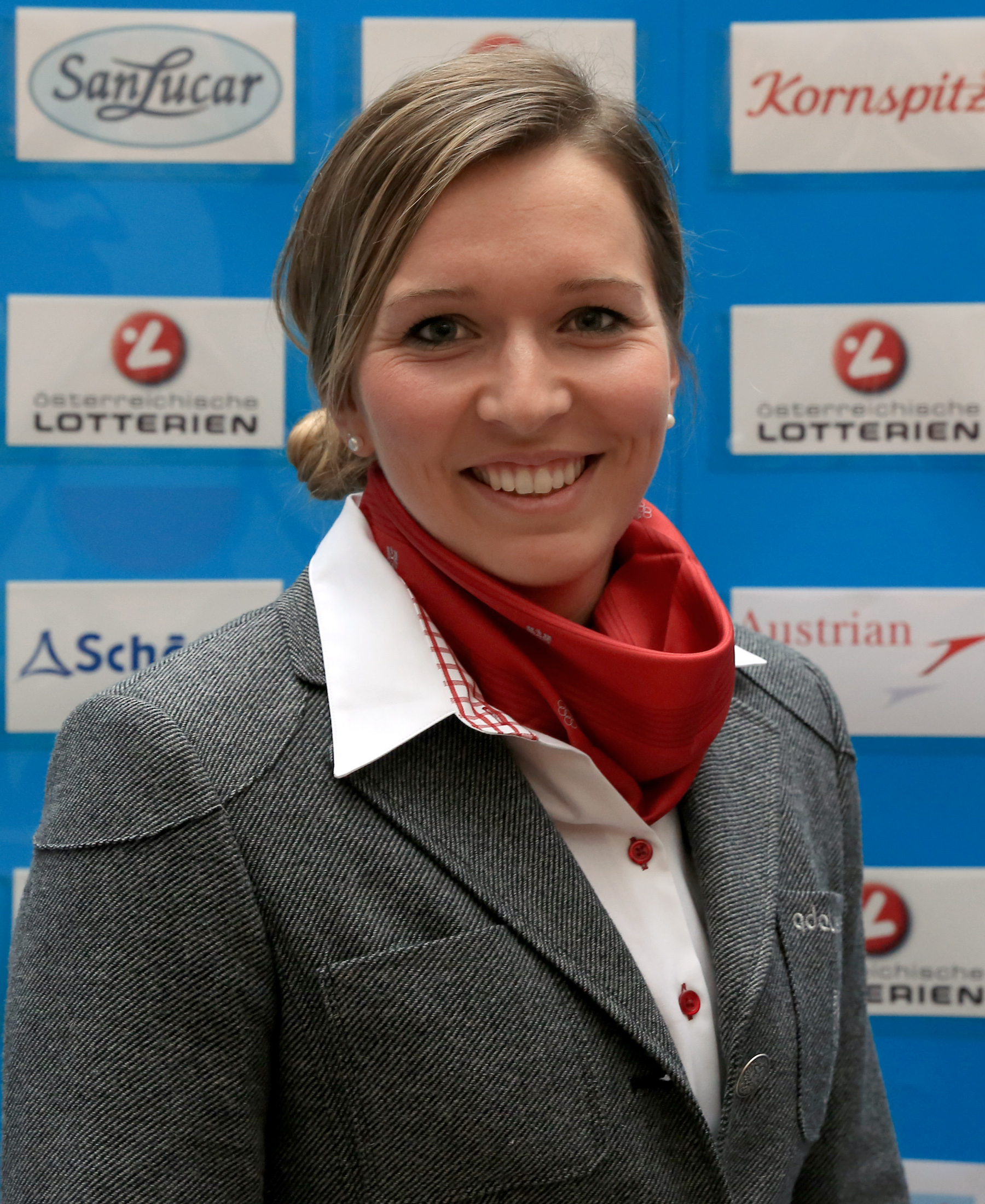
- Hengster at Sochi 2014

Personal information
- Nationality: Austrian
- Born: 4 February 1986 (age 40)
- Height: 1.77 m (5 ft 10 in)
- Weight: 73 kg (161 lb)

Sport
- Country: Austria
- Sport: Bobsleigh

Achievements and titles
- Highest world ranking: 7th (2011–12)
Medal record
World Championships
Silver medal – second place	2016 Igls	Mixed team
European Championships
Bronze medal – third place	2017 Winterberg	Two-woman

Christina Hengster (born 4 February 1986) is an Austrian bobsledder who has competed since 2004. Her best World Cup finish was 2nd in the two-woman event in Park City, Utah, United States, in January 2016.

Hengster's best finish at the FIBT World Championships was 17th in the two-woman event at Lake Placid, New York, in 2009.

She competed for Austria at the 2014 Winter Olympics and 2018 Winter Olympics.
