= IBSF World Championships 2019 – Four-man =

Four-man at the IBSF World Championships 2019
- Venue: Whistler Sliding Centre
- Location: Whistler, Canada
- Dates: March 8–9
- Competitors: 88 from 22 nations
- Teams: 22
- Winning time: 3:21.33

Medalists
gold medal	Francesco Friedrich; Arndt Bauer; Martin Grothkopp; Thorsten Margis	Germany
silver medal	Oskars Ķibermanis; Matīss Miknis; Arvis Vilkaste; Jānis Strenga	Latvia
bronze medal	Justin Kripps; Ryan Sommer; Cameron Stones; Ben Coakwell	Canada

The Four-man competition at the IBSF World Championships 2019 was held on March 8 and 9, 2019.

== Results ==
The first two runs were started on March 8 at 17:04 and the final two runs on March 9 at 17:04.

Rank	Bib	Country	Run 1	Rank	Run 2	Rank	Run 3	Rank	Run 4	Rank	Total	Behind
1st place, gold medalist(s)	4	Germany	50.16	3	50.57	1	50.14	1	50.46	1	3:21.33	
2nd place, silver medalist(s)	5	Latvia	50.05	1	50.64	2	50.28	2	50.65	2	3:21.62	+0.29
3rd place, bronze medalist(s)	9	Canada	50.13	2	50.67	3	50.32	3	50.66	3	3:21.78	+0.45
4	8	Russia	50.17	4	50.82	6	50.42	4	50.68	4	3:22.09	+0.76
5	2	Switzerland	50.31	6	50.76	5	50.46	5	50.74	7	3:22.27	+0.94
6	3	Austria	50.20	5	50.75	4	50.57	6	50.80	8	3:22.32	+0.99
7	10	South Korea	50.52	8	50.89	10	50.70	8	50.68	4	3:22.79	+1.46
8	7	Germany	50.44	7	50.86	8	50.73	9	50.85	9	3:22.88	+1.55
9	6	Germany	50.71	13	50.84	7	50.78	10	50.70	6	3:23.03	+1.70
10	15	Canada	50.63	10	51.00	13	50.67	7	51.03	12	3:23.33	+2.00
11	20	United States	50.73	14	50.86	8	50.80	11	51.05	13	3:23.44	+2.11
12	12	Russia	50.65	12	51.03	14	50.88	12	50.89	10	3:23.45	+2.12
13	16	Great Britain	50.64	11	51.03	14	50.98	15	51.01	11	3:23.66	+2.33
14	22	China	50.88	16	50.97	11	50.97	14	51.15	16	3:23.97	+2.64
15	18	Great Britain	50.91	17	50.97	11	51.01	17	51.16	17	3:24.05	+2.72
16	14	United States	50.91	17	51.10	16	50.93	13	51.13	14	3:24.07	+2.74
17	21	South Korea	51.27	21	51.13	17	51.12	20	51.16	17	3:24.68	+3.35
18	17	Italy	51.21	20	51.27	18	51.07	18	51.16	17	3:24.71	+3.38
19	23	Switzerland	51.15	19	51.43	19	51.10	19	51.14	15	3:24.82	+3.49
20	1	China	50.87	15	51.57	20	51.27	22	51.52	20	3:25.23	+3.90
21	11	Czech Republic	50.56	9	52.29	22	50.99	16	did not advance			
22	19	Canada	51.32	22	51.71	21	51.20	21	did not advance			
	13	Netherlands	1:01.09	23	did not start							
