= IBSF World Championships 2016 – Mixed team =

Mixed team at the IBSF World Championships 2016
- Venue: Olympic Sliding Centre Innsbruck, Igls
- Date: 14 February
- Competitors: 84 from 6 nations
- Teams: 14
- Winning time: 3:31.47

Medalists
gold medal	Axel Jungk; Anja Schneiderheinze-Stöckel; Franziska Bertels; Tina Hermann; Johannes Lochner; Tino Paasche	Germany
silver medal	Matthias Guggenberger; Christina Hengster; Sanne Dekker; Janine Flock; Benjamin Maier; Dănuț Moldovan	Austria
bronze medal	Michael Zachrau; Stephanie Schneider; Anne Lobenstein; Jacqueline Lölling; Nico Walther; Jannis Bäcker	Germany

The mixed team event in the IBSF World Championships 2016 was held on 14 February 2016.

First introduced at the 2007 championships, the mixed team event consists of one run each of men's skeleton, women's skeleton, 2-man bobsleigh, and 2-women bobsleigh.

== Results ==
The runs were started at 15:00.

Rank	Bib	Country	Total	Behind
1st place, gold medalist(s)	12	Germany	3:31.47	
2nd place, silver medalist(s)	5	Austria	3:32.93	+1.46
3rd place, bronze medalist(s)	13	Germany	3:33.05	+1.58
4	10	Canada	3:33.35	+1.88
5	7	United States	3:33.55	+2.08
6	9	United States	3:33.63	+2.16
7	3	Canada	3:33.73	+2.26
8	14	United Kingdom	3:33.79	+2.32
9	6	International	3:33.95	+2.48
10	1	International	3:34.23	+2.76
11	8	International	3:34.29	+2.82
12	11	Austria	3:34.62	+3.15
13	4	Russia	3:35.08	+3.61
DSQ	2	Russia	~~3:32.12~~	~~+0.65~~
