= Maria Constantin =

Romanian bobsledder

Personal information
- Nationality: Romanian
- Born: 28 August 1991 (age 34) Bucharest, Romania
- Height: 1.73 m (5 ft 8 in)
- Weight: 78 kg (172 lb)

Sport
- Country: Romania
- Sport: Bobsleigh
Medal record
FIBT World Championships
Bronze medal – third place	2017 Königssee	Mixed team

Maria Adela Constantin (born 28 August 1991) is a Romanian bobsledder.

Constantin competed at the 2014 Winter Olympics for Romania. She teamed with Andreea Grecu in the two-woman event, finishing 17th.

As of April 2014, her best showing at the World Championships is 12th, in the 2013 team competition. Her best finish in an Olympic discipline is 21st in 2013.

Constantin made her World Cup debut in January 2014. As of April 2014, her best World Cup finish is 18th, at a pair of events in 2013-14.
