= Stephanie Schneider =

German bobsledder (born 1990)

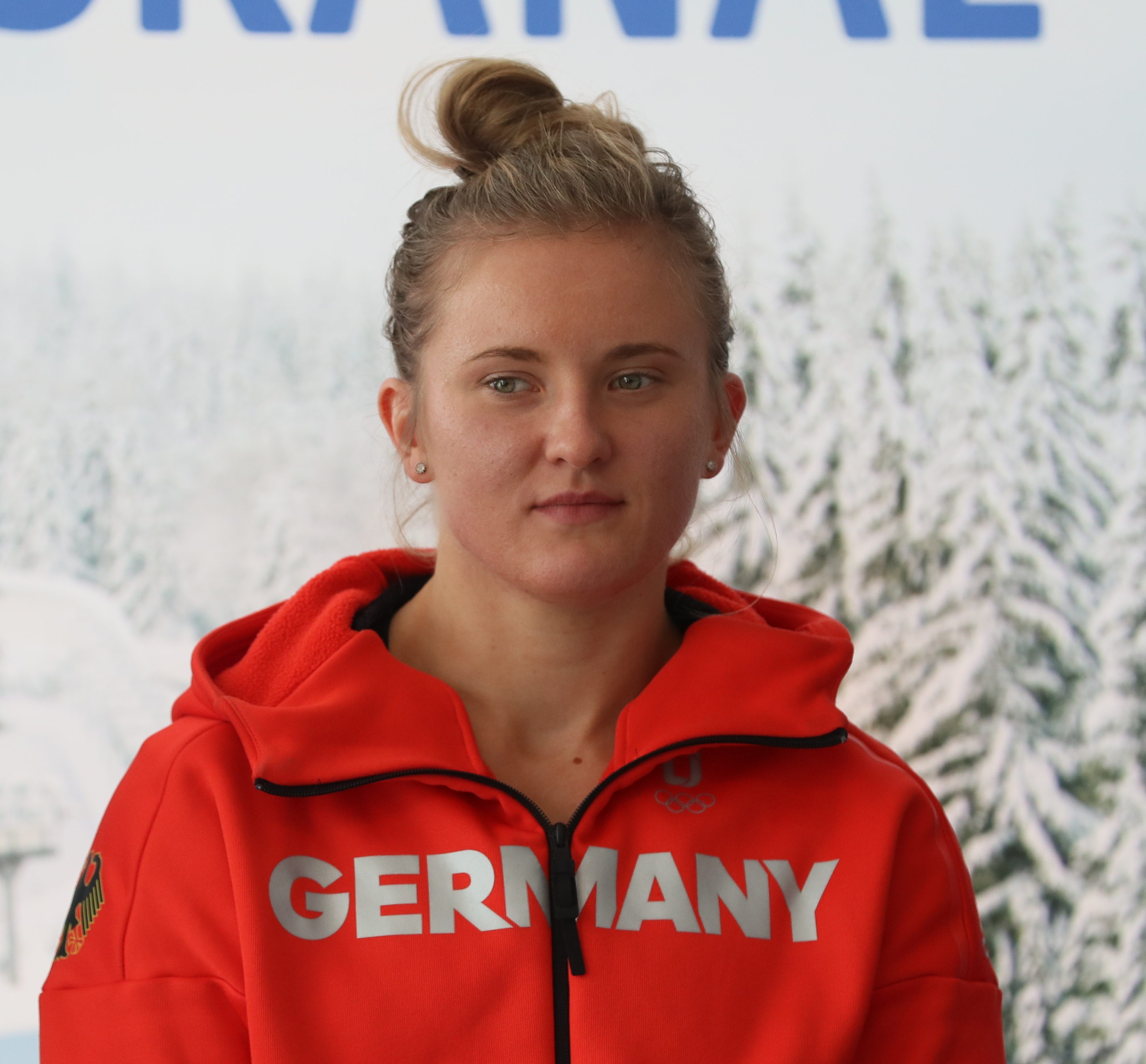

Personal information
- Born: 25 September 1990 (age 35) Breitenbrunn, East Germany
- Height: 1.70 m (5 ft 7 in)
- Weight: 75 kg (165 lb)

Sport
- Country: Germany
- Sport: Bobsleigh
- Event: Two-woman
- Club: BSC Sachsen Oberbärenburg
- Turned pro: 2008
Medal record
World Championships
Gold medal – first place	2011 Königssee	Mixed team
Silver medal – second place	2017 Königssee	Mixed team
Silver medal – second place	2019 Whistler	Two-woman
Silver medal – second place	2021 Alternberg	Monobob
Bronze medal – third place	2015 Winterberg	Two-woman
Bronze medal – third place	2016 Igls	Mixed team
European Championships
Gold medal – first place	2018 Igls	Two-woman
Silver medal – second place	2015 La Plagne	Two-woman
Silver medal – second place	2019 Königssee	Two-woman
Bronze medal – third place	2013 Igls	Two-woman
Bronze medal – third place	2016 St. Moritz	Two-woman
Bronze medal – third place	2020 Sigulda	Two-woman

Stephanie Schneider (born 25 September 1990) is a German bobsledder who has competed since 2008. Her best World Cup finish was first in the two-woman events at Whistler in November and Lake Placid in December 2010.

She won gold at the 2011 FIBT World Championships in Königssee in the mixed team events.

== World Cup results ==
All results are sourced from the International Bobsleigh and Skeleton Federation (IBSF).

Season	1	2	3	4	5	6	7	8	9	Points	Place
2010–11	1	-	-	1	6	-	-	3		-	-
2011–12	-	5	-	-	-	-	1	-		-	-
2012–13	-	3	7	3	6	1	9	6	8	-	-
2013–14	5	11	-	-	3	5	3	-		-	-
2014–15	-	-	-	-	-	6	5	-		-	-
2015–16	-	-	-	-	-	-	6	13		296	15th
2016–17	-	-	-	-	-	13	4	7		480	18th
2017–18	3	4	20	1	1	DNF	3	1		1335	5th
2018–19	8	1	6	3	1	2	3	3		1596	2nd
2019–20	2	4	1	3	5	3	3	3		1611	1st
2020–21	-	-	-	1	-	1	2	-		660	13th
2021–22	-	-	-	-	-	8	-	-		-	-
