= Andreea Grecu =

Romanian sprinter and bobsledder

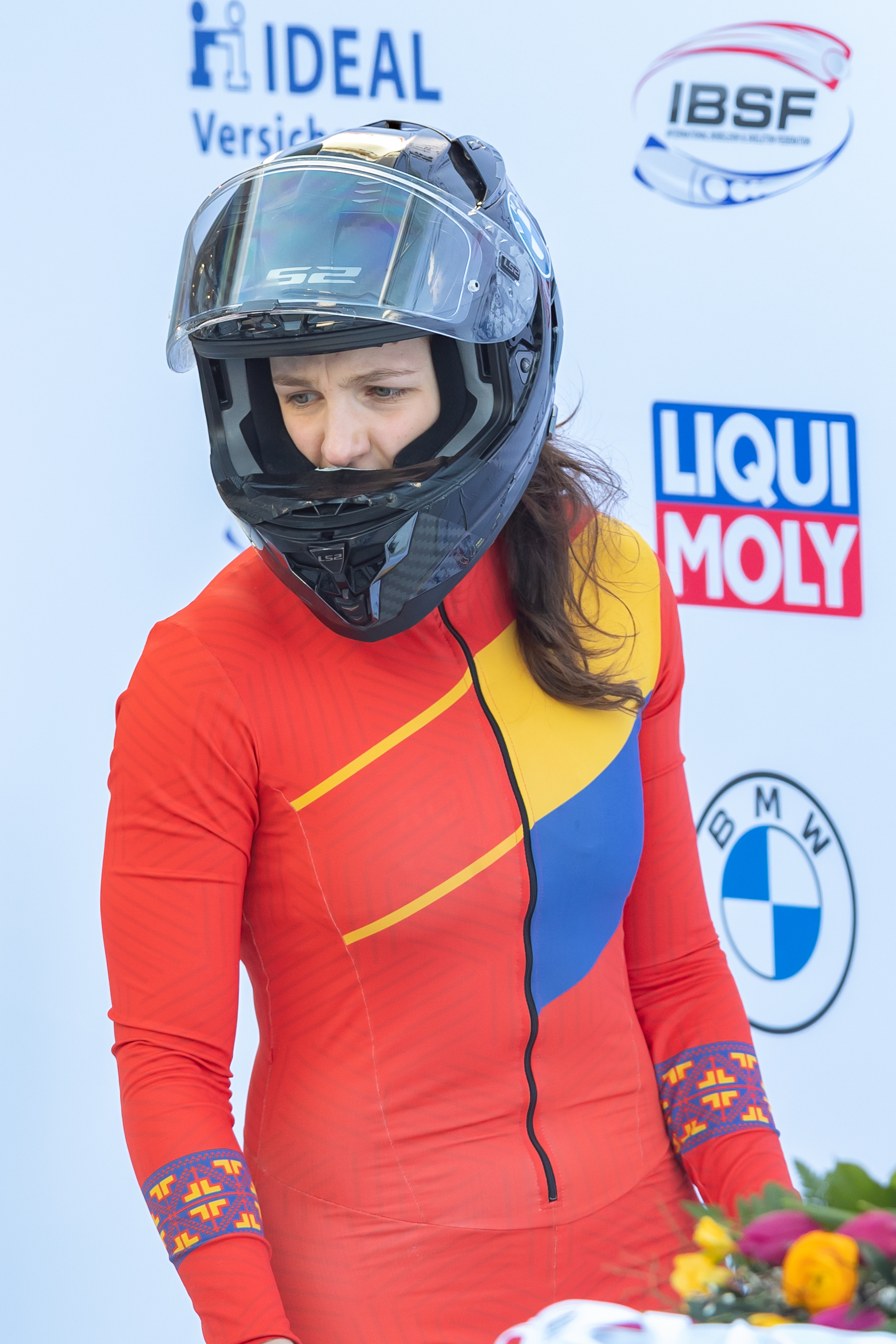
- Grecu in 2021

Personal information
- Nationality: Romanian
- Born: 10 January 1994 (age 32) Bucharest, Romania
- Height: 1.76 m (5 ft 9 in)
- Weight: 74 kg (163 lb)

Sport
- Country: Romania
- Sport: Athletics, Bobsleigh
Medal record
Women's bobsleigh
Representing Romania
World Championships
Bronze medal – third place	2017 Königssee	Mixed team
European Championships
Silver medal – second place	2020 Sigulda	Two-woman
Silver medal – second place	2023 Altenberg	Monobob
Silver medal – second place	2024 Sigulda	Monobob
IBSF Junior World Championships
Gold medal – first place	2018 St. Moritz	Two-woman

Andreea Grecu (born 10 January 1994) is a Romanian sprinter and bobsledder.

Grecu competed at the 2014 Winter Olympics for Romania. She teamed with Maria Constantin in the two-woman event, finishing 17th.

As of February 2015, her best showing as a brakewoman at the World Championships is 9th, in the 2014 FIBT World Championships. As of September 2015, she competed in athletics, World Championships Beijing at 4x400m relay.

Her best finish in an Olympic discipline as a brakewoman is 15th in 2018. Grecu made her World Cup debut as a pilot in 2016. As a pilot she won gold medal in 2018 IBSF U26 World Championships, St.Moritz in two-woman event with Florentina Marincu-Iușco. In 2019 she won silver medal in IBSF U26 World Championships, Königssee in two-woman event with Teodora Vlad. As of January 2019, her best World Cup finish is 5th and 4th place at European Championships, Königssee, in a pair of events in 2018-19.
