= Marc Rademacher =

German bobsledder (born 1990)

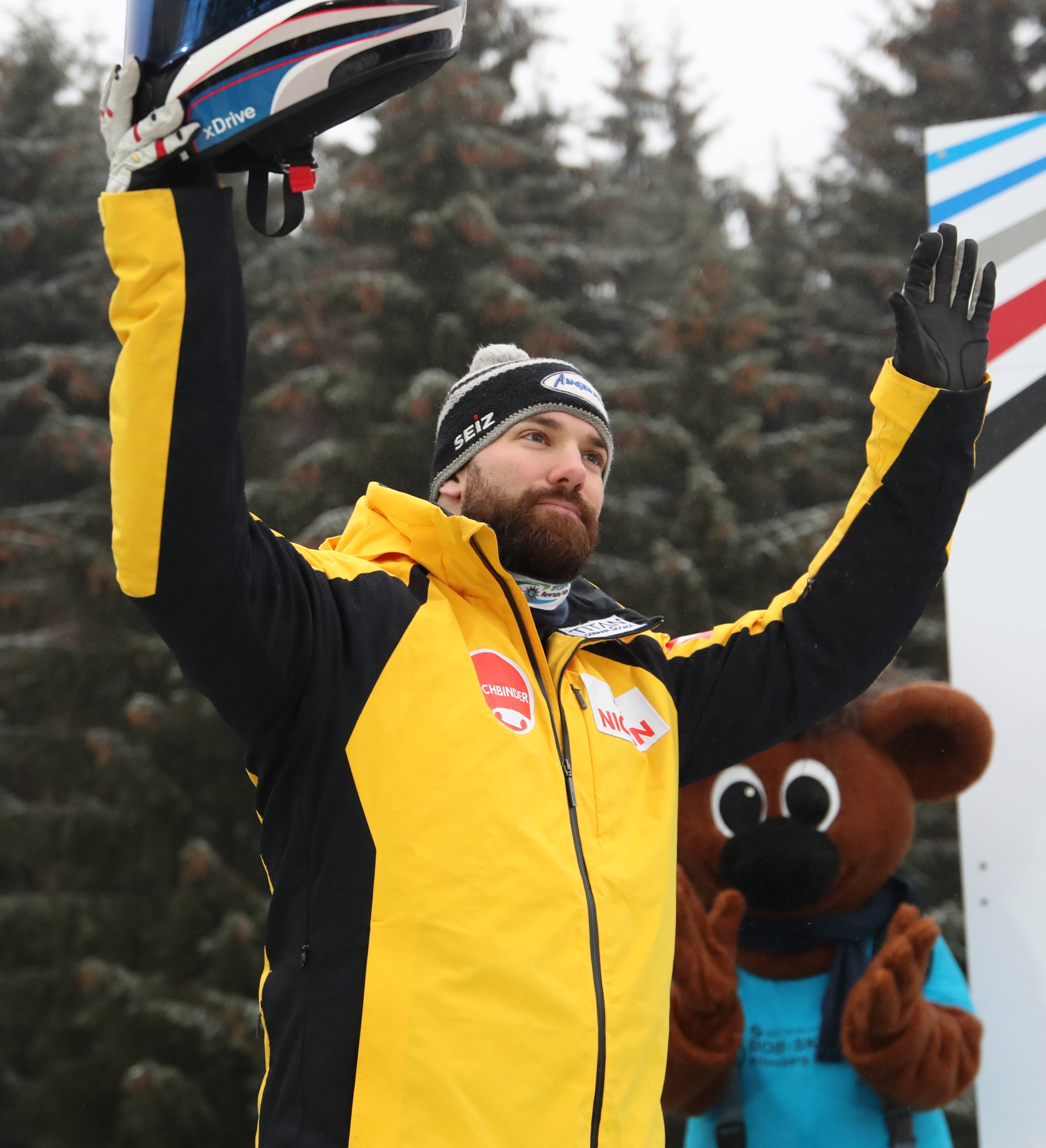

Personal information
- Nationality: German
- Born: 12 October 1990 (age 35)
- Height: 1.92 m (6 ft 4 in)
- Weight: 110 kg (243 lb)

Sport
- Country: Germany
- Sport: Bobsleigh
- Event: Two-man
- Club: BC Bad Feilnbach
- Turned pro: 2013
Medal record
World Championships
Gold medal – first place	2019 Whistler	Mixed team
Bronze medal – third place	2017 Schönau am Königssee	Mixed team

Marc Rademacher (born 12 October 1990) is a German bobsledder.

He participated at the IBSF World Championships 2017, winning a bronze medal and at the IBSF World Championships 2019, winning a gold medal, both in the Mixed team competition.
