= IBSF World Championships 2021 =

Bobsleigh and skeleton competition

- Venue: Altenberg bobsleigh, luge, and skeleton track
- Location: Altenberg, Germany
- Dates: 5–14 February

The 2021 IBSF World Championships was held in Altenberg, Germany from 5 to 14 February 2021. They were originally awarded to Lake Placid but were moved because of the COVID-19 pandemic.

This year saw the introduction of the Women's Monobob event to the World Championships.

== Schedule ==
Seven events were held.

All times are local (UTC+1).

Bobsleigh

Date	Time	Events
5 February	10:30	Two-women run 1 & 2
6 February	10:00	Two-men run 1 & 2
6 February	14:30	Two-women run 3 & 4
7 February	14:30	Two-men run 3 & 4
13 February	11:30	Women’s Monobob run 1 & 2
13 February	15:45	Four-men run 1 & 2
14 February	09:00	Women’s Monobob run 3 & 4
14 February	15:00	Four-men run 3 & 4

Skeleton

Date	Time	Events
11 February	09:00	Women run 1 & 2
11 February	13:00	Men run 1 & 2
12 February	09:00	Women run 3 & 4
12 February	13:00	Men run 3 & 4
13 February	09:00	Skeleton mixed team

== Russia doping ban ==
On 9 December 2019, the World Anti-Doping Agency (WADA) banned Russia from all international sport for a period of four years, after the Russian government was found to have tampered with laboratory data that it provided to WADA in January 2019 as a condition of the Russian Anti-Doping Agency being reinstated. As a result of the ban, WADA plans to allow individually cleared Russian athletes to take part in the 2021-2022 World Championships and 2022 Summer Olympics under a neutral banner, as instigated at the 2018 Winter Olympics, but they will not be permitted to compete in team sports. The title of the neutral banner has yet to be determined; WADA Compliance Review Committee head Jonathan Taylor stated that the IOC would not be able to use "Olympic Athletes from Russia" (OAR) as it did in 2018, emphasizing that neutral athletes cannot be portrayed as representing a specific country. Russia later filed an appeal to the Court of Arbitration for Sport (CAS) against the WADA decision. After reviewing the case on appeal, CAS ruled on 17 December 2020 to reduce the penalty that WADA had placed on Russia. Instead of banning Russia from sporting events, the ruling allowed Russia to participate at the Olympics and other international events, but for a period of two years, the team cannot use the Russian name, flag, or anthem and must present themselves as "Neutral Athlete" or "Neutral Team". The ruling does allow for team uniforms to display "Russia" on the uniform as well as the use of the Russian flag colors within the uniform's design, although the name should be up to equal predominance as the "Neutral Athlete/Team" designation.

== Medal summary ==
=== Medal table ===
* Host nation (Germany)

Rank	Nation	Gold	Silver	Bronze	Total
1	Germany*	5	5	5	15
2	United States	2	0	0	2
3	Bobsleigh Federation of Russia	0	1	2	3
4	Austria	0	1	0	1
Totals (4 entries)		7	7	7	21

=== Bobsleigh ===
Event	Gold		Silver		Bronze	
Two-man	Germany; Francesco Friedrich; Alexander Schüller	3:39.78	Germany; Johannes Lochner; Eric Franke	3:41.83	Germany; Hans-Peter Hannighofer; Christian Röder	3:42.01
Four-man	Germany; Francesco Friedrich; Thorsten Margis; Candy Bauer; Alexander Schüller	3:35.02	Austria; Benjamin Maier; Dănuț Moldovan; Markus Sammer; Kristian Huber	3:35.81	Germany; Johannes Lochner; Florian Bauer; Christopher Weber; Christian Rasp	3:36.53
Women’s Monobob	Kaillie Humphries; United States	3:59.62	Stephanie Schneider; Germany	4:00.12	Laura Nolte; Germany	4:00.42
Two-woman	United States; Kaillie Humphries; Lolo Jones	3:48.26	Germany; Kim Kalicki; Ann-Christin Strack	3:48.61	Germany; Laura Nolte; Deborah Levi	3:49.27

=== Skeleton ===
Event	Gold		Silver		Bronze	
Men	Christopher Grotheer; Germany	3:46.31	Aleksandr Tretyakov; Bobsleigh Federation of Russia	3:46.59	Alexander Gassner; Germany	3:47.51
Women	Tina Hermann; Germany	3:52.97	Jacqueline Lölling; Germany	3:53.08	Elena Nikitina; Bobsleigh Federation of Russia	3:54.65
Skeleton mixed team	Germany; Tina Hermann; Christopher Grotheer	1:55.41	Germany; Jacqueline Lölling; Alexander Gassner	1:55.55	Bobsleigh Federation of Russia; Elena Nikitina; Aleksandr Tretyakov	1:55.56

== Participating countries ==
A total of 24 countries competed

- American Samoa (1)
- Australia (5)
- Austria (13)
- Belgium (4)
- Brazil (1)
- Canada (19)
- Czech Republic (6)
- France (7)
- Germany (30) (host nation)
- Ghana (1)
- Great Britain (18)
- Italy (8)
- Latvia (13)
- Luxembourg (1)
- Netherlands (5)
- Poland (2)
- Romania (7)
- Bobsleigh Federation of Russia (25)
- Slovakia (1)
- South Korea (14)
- Spain (1)
- Switzerland (20)
- Ukraine (2)
- United States (9)

== See also ==
- IBSF European Championships 2021
- IBSF Junior World Championships 2021
