= Franziska Bertels =

German bobsledder (born 1986)

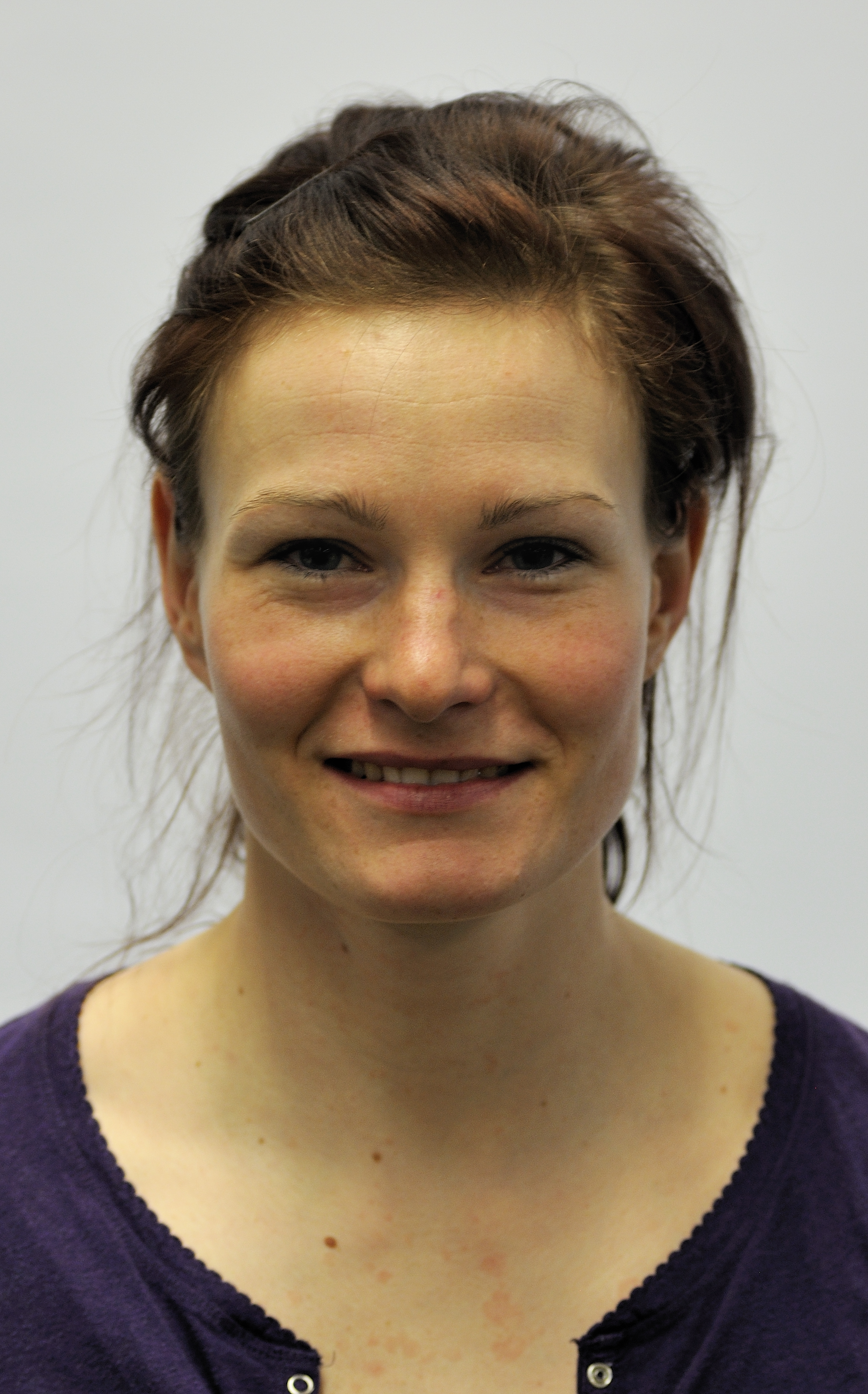
- Bertels in 2014

Personal information
- Born: 24 October 1986 (age 39)
- Height: 1.78 m (5 ft 10 in)
- Weight: 69 kg (152 lb)

Sport
- Country: Germany
- Sport: Bobsleigh
- Event: Two-woman
- Turned pro: 2006
Medal record
World Championships
Gold medal – first place	2016 Igls	Mixed team
Gold medal – first place	2017 Königssee	Mixed team
Silver medal – second place	2015 Winterberg	Mixed team
Bronze medal – third place	2013 St. Moritz	Two-women
European Championships
Gold medal – first place	2013 Innsbruck-Igls	Two-woman
Gold medal – first place	2015 La Plagne	Two-woman

Franziska Bertels (born 24 October 1986) is a German bobsledder who has competed since 2006.
