= Lake Kwaza =

American bobsledder and sprinter (born 1993)

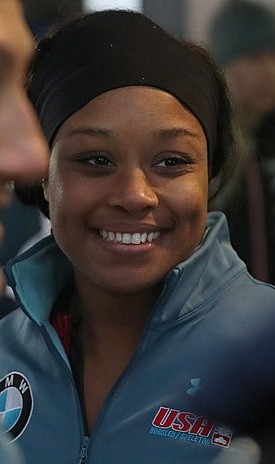
- Lake Kwaza in Altenberg in 2019

Personal information
- National team: United States
- Born: November 7, 1993 (age 32) Sycamore, Illinois

Sport
- Sport: Bobsled
Medal record
Bobsleigh World Cup
Bronze medal – third place	2018 Winterberg	Two-woman
Bronze medal – third place	2019 Altenberg	Two-woman
Silver medal – second place	2019 Konigssee	Two-woman
Gold medal – first place	2019 Lake Placid	Two-woman
Silver medal – second place	2019 Igls	Two-woman
Gold medal – first place	2022 Sigulda	Two-woman

Lake Kwaza (born 7 November 1993) is an American bobsledder and sprinter.

== Biography ==
Kwaza was recruited to the American bobsled team in 2017. She competed in track and field as a sprinter at The University of Iowa from 2012 to 2016 and competed in Olympic trials for the United States in 2016 in the 200m.

During the 2018–19 Bobsleigh World Cup she was paired with three-time Olympic medallist Elana Meyers acting as the brakewoman of a two-women bobsled. Her best performance to date was a gold medal finish at the 2019 Lake Placid event. She took part in the 2019 World Championships in the two-women event but did not finish having completed only four of the five required runs.

She joined the United States Army in 2019 as part of their World Class Athlete Program with the aim of qualifying for the 2022 Winter Olympics.

Lake is currently dating USA Olympic bobsledder Hakeem Abdul-Saboor.
