= Sascha Stepan =

Austrian bobsledder (born 1998)

Personal information
- Born: 11 January 1998 (age 28) Schwaz, Austria
- Height: 1.82 m (6 ft 0 in)
- Weight: 85 kg (187 lb)

Sport
- Country: Austria
- Sport: Bobsleigh
- Event(s): Two-man, four-man
Medal record
Men's bobsleigh
Representing Austria
European Championships
Silver medal – second place	2021 Winterberg	Four-man

Sascha Stepan (born 11 January 1998) is an Austrian bobsledder. He represented Austria at the 2022 and 2026 Winter Olympics.

== Career ==
Stepan competed at the IBSF European Championships 2021 and won a silver medal in the four-man event with a time of 1:48.89.

In January 2026, he was selected to represent Austria at the 2026 Winter Olympics.
