= Ann-Christin Strack =

German bobsledder (born 1993)

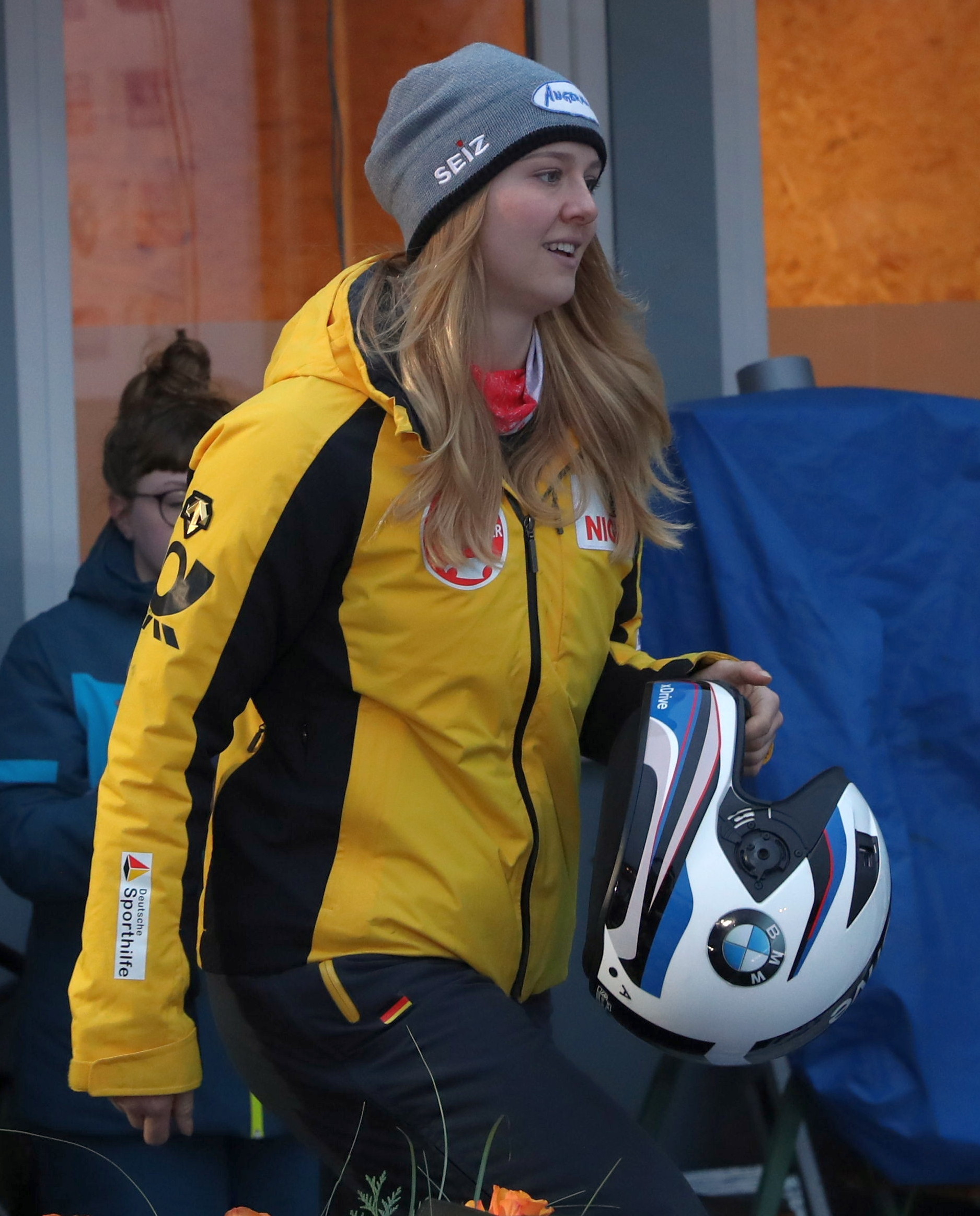

Personal information
- Nationality: German
- Born: 20 December 1993 (age 32) Giessen, Germany
- Height: 1.73 m (5 ft 8 in)
- Weight: 73 kg (161 lb)

Sport
- Country: Germany
- Sport: Bobsleigh
- Event: Two-woman
- Club: Bob-Club Stuttgart Solitude
- Turned pro: 2015
Medal record
World Championships
Silver medal – second place	2019 Whistler	Two-woman
Silver medal – second place	2021 Alternberg	Two-woman
European Championships
Silver medal – second place	2019 Königssee	Two-woman
Silver medal – second place	2021 Winterberg	Two-woman
Bronze medal – third place	2018 Igls	Two-woman

Ann-Christin Strack (born 20 December 1993) is a German bobsledder.

She participated at the IBSF World Championships 2019, winning a medal.
