= IBSF World Championships 2017 =

Bobsleigh and skeleton competition

2017 World Championships
- Venue: Kunsteisbahn Königssee
- Location: Königssee, Germany
- Dates: February 13 – 26

The IBSF World Championships 2017 took place at the Königssee bobsleigh, luge, and skeleton track in Königssee, Germany, from 13 to 26 February 2017.

== Schedule ==
Six events were held.

All times are local (UTC+1).

Date	Time	Events
17 February	14:15	Two-women run 1
17 February	16:00	Two-women run 2
18 February	10:30	Two-men run 1
18 February	12:00	Two-men run 2
18 February	15:15	Two-women run 3
18 February	16:45	Two-women run 4
19 February	10:30	Two-men run 3
19 February	12:00	Two-men run 4
19 February	15:00	Mixed team
24 February	11:00	Men run 1
24 February	13:00	Men run 2
24 February	15:00	Women run 1
24 February	17:00	Women run 2
25 February	08:30	Women run 3
25 February	10:30	Women run 4
25 February	13:30	Four-men run 1
25 February	15:20	Four-men run 2
26 February	08:30	Men run 3
26 February	10:30	Men run 4
26 February	13:30	Four-men run 3
26 February	15:20	Four-men run 4

== Medal summary ==
=== Medal table ===
Rank	Nation	Gold	Silver	Bronze	Total
1	Germany (GER)	5	3	2	10
2	United States (USA)	1	0	1	2
3	Latvia (LAT)	1	0	0	1
4	Canada (CAN)	0	2	0	2
5	Great Britain (GBR)	0	0	1	1
5	Russia (RUS)	0	0	1	1
Totals (6 entries)		7	5	5	17

=== Bobsleigh ===
Event	Gold		Silver		Bronze	
Two-man	Germany; Francesco Friedrich; Thorsten Margis	3:16.71	Canada; Justin Kripps; Jesse Lumsden	3:17.91	Germany; Johannes Lochner; Joshua Bluhm	3:17.96
Four-man	Germany; Francesco Friedrich; Arndt Bauer; Martin Grothkopp; Thorsten Margis; Germany; Johannes Lochner; Matthias Kagerhuber; Joshua Bluhm; Christian Rasp	3:14.10	no medal		Germany; Nico Walther; Kevin Kuske; Kevin Korona; Eric Franke	3:14.26
Two-woman	United States; Elana Meyers; Kehri Jones	3:24.75	Canada; Kaillie Humphries; Melissa Lotholz	3:24.78	United States; Jamie Greubel; Aja Evans	3:24.98

=== Skeleton ===
Event	Gold		Silver		Bronze	
Men	Martins Dukurs; Latvia	3:23.48	Axel Jungk; Germany	3:23.85	Nikita Tregubov; Russia	3:24.02
Women	Jacqueline Lölling; Germany	2:35.35	Tina Hermann; Germany	2:35.60	Lizzy Yarnold; Great Britain	2:36.08

=== Mixed ===
Event	Gold		Silver		Bronze	
Mixed team	Germany 1 Axel Jungk; Mariama Jamanka; Franziska Bertels; Jacqueline Lölling; Johannes Lochner; Christian Rasp	3:21.84	Germany 2 Christopher Grotheer; Stephanie Schneider; Lisa-Marie Buckwitz; Tina Hermann; Nico Walther; Philipp Wobeto	3:22.44	International 3 (Germany) Alexander Gassner (Romania) Maria Constantin (Romania) Andreea Grecu (Germany) Anna Fernstädt (Germany) Richard Ölsner (Germany) Marc Rademacher	3:22.69
