= Christopher Weber =

German bobsledder (born 1991)

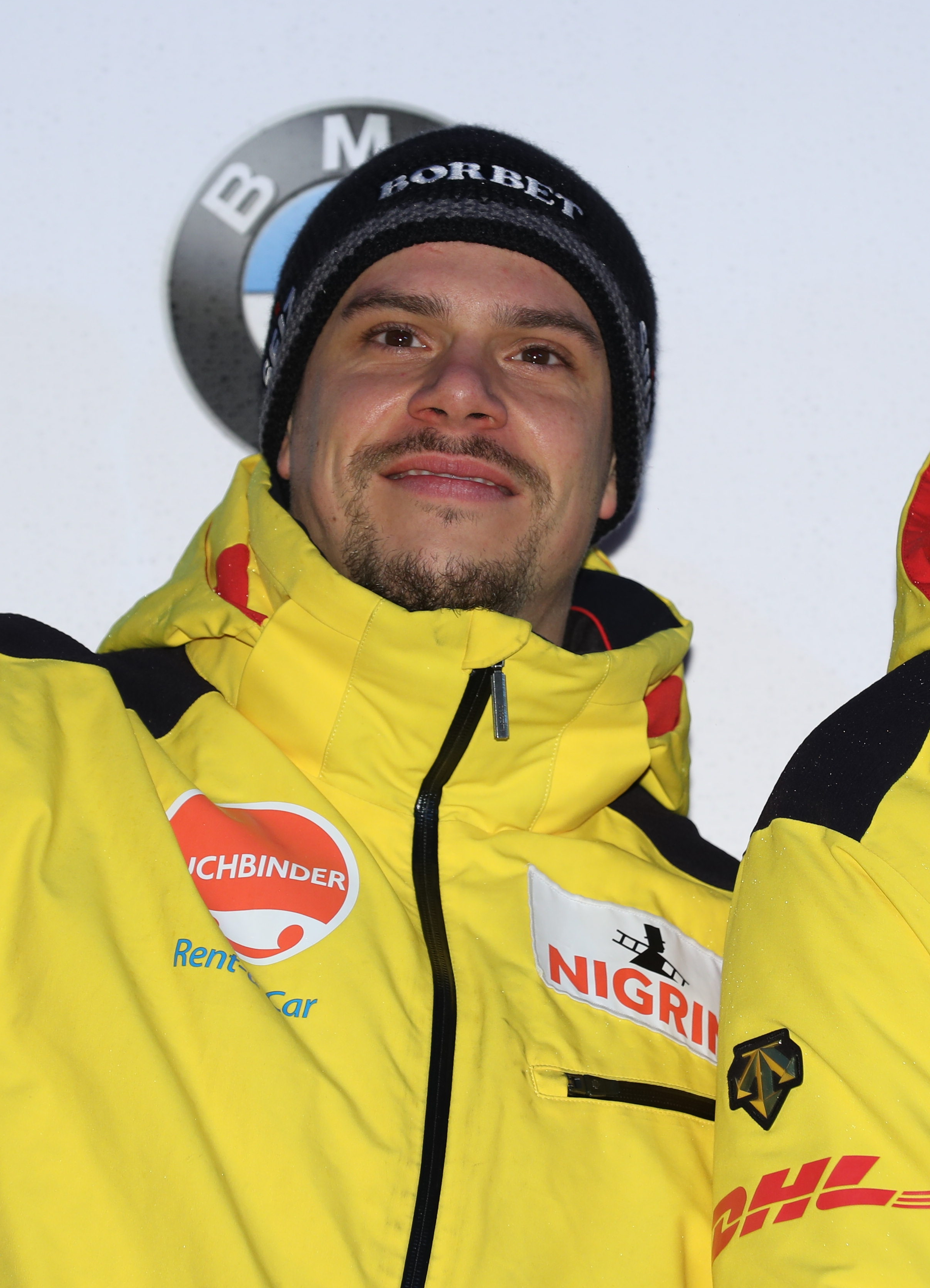
- Weber in 2020

Personal information
- Nationality: German
- Born: 5 October 1991 (age 34) Dortmund, Germany
- Height: 1.88 m (6 ft 2 in)
- Weight: 105 kg (231 lb)

Sport
- Country: Germany
- Sport: Bobsleigh
- Event(s): Two-man, Four-man
- Club: BSC Winterberg
Medal record
Olympic Games
Silver medal – second place	2022 Beijing	Four-man
World Championships
Silver medal – second place	2020 Altenberg	Two-man
Silver medal – second place	2020 Altenberg	Four-man
Bronze medal – third place	2021 Altenberg	Four-man
European Championships
Gold medal – first place	2020 Winterberg	Four-man

Christopher Weber (born 5 October 1991) is a German bobsledder. He competed in the two-man event at the 2018 Winter Olympics.

== Career ==
Christopher Weber made his Olympic debut at the 2018 Winter Olympics in Pyeongchang, where he competed as a brakeman in both the two-man bobsleigh and four-man bobsleigh events, piloted by Johannes Lochner. In the two-man event, the duo finished in fifth place, while in the four-man competition, Weber, along with fellow brakemen Christian Poser and Christian Rasp, placed eighth.

At the 2022 Winter Olympics in Beijing, he won the silver medal in the four-man bobsleigh event as part of the team led by pilot Johannes Lochner.

== Awards ==
- 2022: Silbernes Lorbeerblatt
