= Martin Grothkopp =

German bobsledder (born 1986)

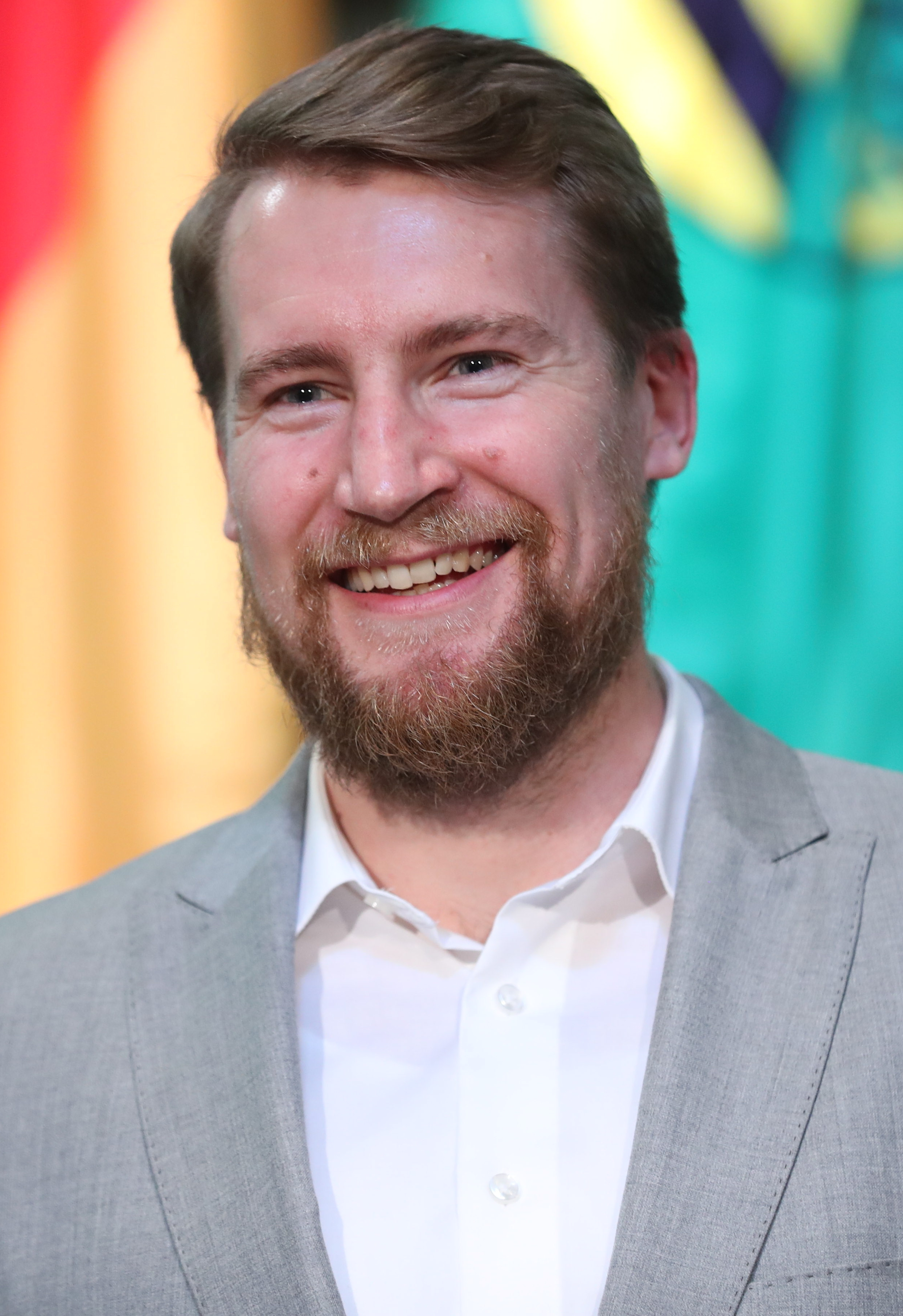
- Grothkopp in 2022

Personal information
- Nationality: German
- Born: 21 June 1986 (age 40) Dresden, East Germany
- Height: 1.91 m (6 ft 3 in)
- Weight: 103 kg (227 lb)

Sport
- Country: Germany
- Sport: Bobsleigh
- Event: Four-man
- Club: BSC Sachsen Oberbärenburg
- Turned pro: 2013
Medal record
Olympic Games
Gold medal – first place	2018 Pyeongchang	Four-man
World Championships
Gold medal – first place	2015 Winterberg	Team
Gold medal – first place	2017 Königssee	Four-man
Gold medal – first place	2019 Whistler	Four-man
Gold medal – first place	2020 Altenberg	Four-man
European Championships
Gold medal – first place	2015 La Plagne	Two-man
Gold medal – first place	2019 Königssee	Two-man
Silver medal – second place	2018 Igls	Four-man
Silver medal – second place	2022 St. Moritz	Four-man
Bronze medal – third place	2015 La Plagne	Four-man
Bronze medal – third place	2019 Königssee	Four-man

Martin Grothkopp (born 21 June 1986) is a German bobsledder. He competed in the four-man event at the 2018 Winter Olympics, winning the gold medal.

He also represented Germany as a track and field sprinter, competing in the 4 × 400 metres relay team at the 2009 World Championships in Athletics and winning 400 metres gold at the 2009 German Athletics Championships.
