= Oskars Ķibermanis =

Latvian bobsledder

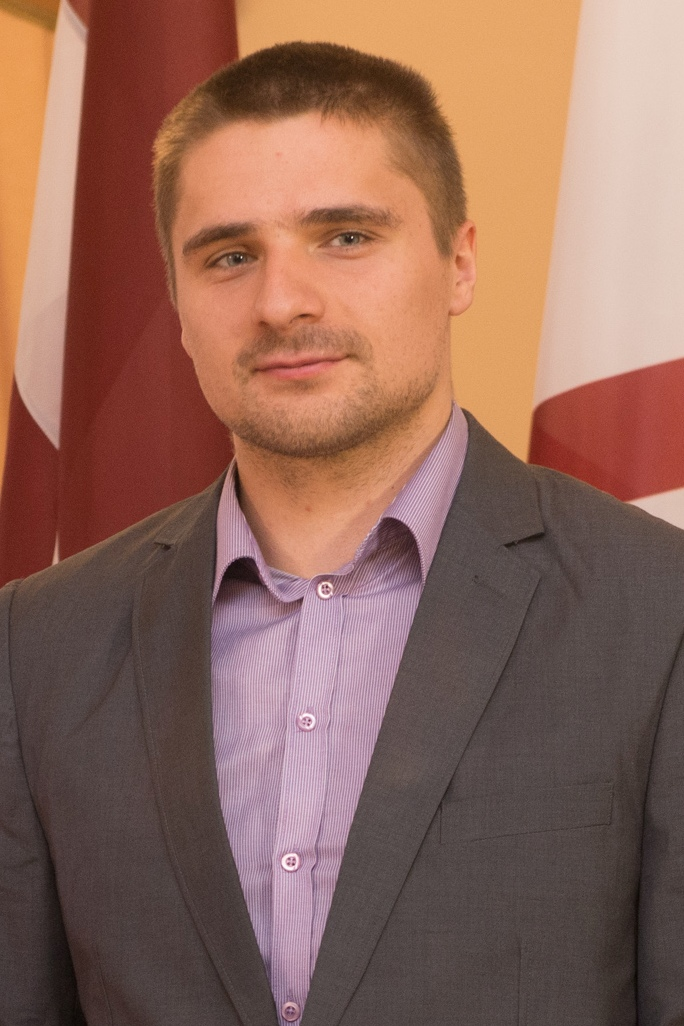
- Ķibermanis in 2015

Personal information
- Nationality: Latvian
- Born: 4 April 1993 (age 33) Valmiera, Latvia
- Height: 1.86 m (6 ft 1 in)
- Weight: 92 kg (203 lb)

Sport
- Country: Latvia
- Sport: Bobsleigh
- Events: Two-man, Four-man
- Turned pro: 2011
Medal record
Men's bobsleigh
Representing Latvia
World Championships
Silver medal – second place	2019 Whistler	Four-man
Bronze medal – third place	2020 Altenberg	Two-man
European Championships
Gold medal – first place	2020 Sigulda	Two-man
Gold medal – first place	2022 St. Moritz	Four-man
Silver medal – second place	2019 Königssee	Four-man
Bronze medal – third place	2017 Winterberg	Two-man

Oskars Ķibermanis (born 4 April 1993) is a former Latvian bobsledder. He competed at the FIBT World Championships 2013 in St. Moritz, and at the 2014 Winter Olympics in Sochi, in two-man and four-man bobsleigh.

He retired from the sport in 2023 after failing to successfully recover from a knee injury.
