= Eric Franke =

German bobsledder (born 1989)

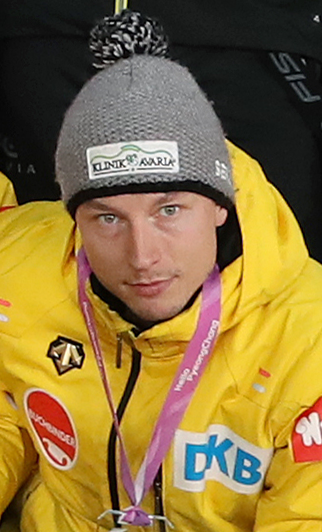
- Franke in 2017

Personal information
- Nationality: German
- Born: 16 August 1989 (age 36) Berlin, Germany

Sport
- Country: Germany
- Sport: Bobsleigh
- Event: Four-man
- Club: SC Potsdam
Medal record
Olympic Games
| Silver medal – second place | 2018 Pyeongchang | Four-man |
World Championships
| Silver medal – second place | 2021 Alternberg | Two-man |
| Bronze medal – third place | 2017 Königssee | Four-man |
| Bronze medal – third place | 2020 Altenberg | Four-man |
European Championships
| Silver medal – second place | 2017 Winterberg | Four-man |
| Silver medal – second place | 2021 Winterberg | Two-man |
| Bronze medal – third place | 2020 Winterberg | Four-man |

Eric Franke (born 16 August 1989) is a German bobsledder. He competed in the four-man event at the 2018 Winter Olympics winning a silver medal.
