= Arndt Bauer =

German bobsledder (born 1986)

Arndt "Candy" Bauer
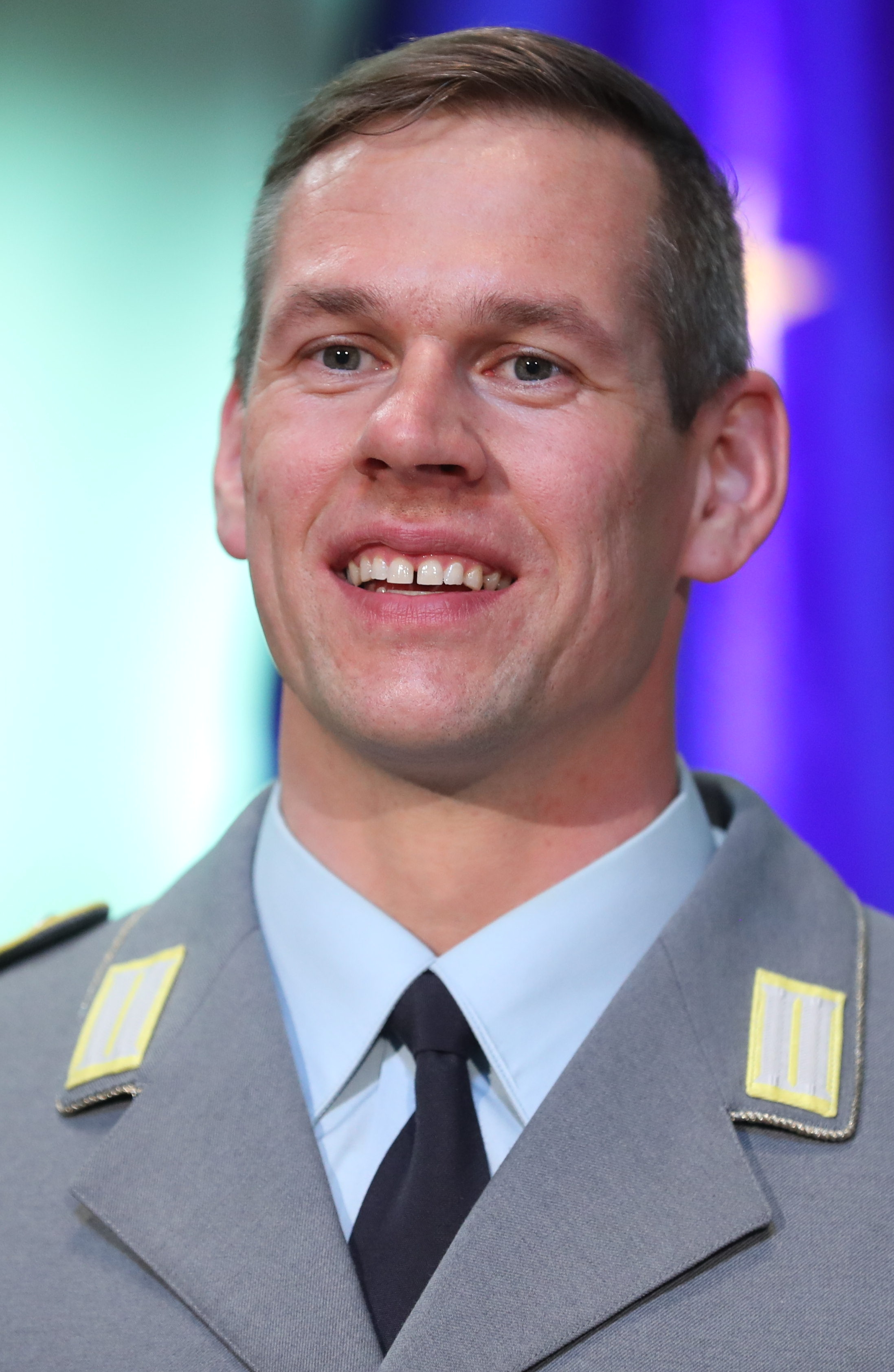
- Bauer in 2022

Personal information
- Nationality: German
- Born: 31 July 1986 (age 39) Zschopau, East Germany
- Height: 1.88 m (6 ft 2 in)
- Weight: 110 kg (243 lb)

Sport
- Country: Germany
- Sport: Bobsleigh
- Event: Four-man
- Club: BSC Sachsen Oberbärenburg
- Turned pro: 2013
Medal record
Men's bobsleigh
Representing Germany
Olympic Games
Gold medal – first place	2018 Pyeongchang	Four-man
Gold medal – first place	2022 Beijing	Four-man
World Championships
Gold medal – first place	2017 Königssee	Four-man
Gold medal – first place	2019 Whistler	Four-man
Gold medal – first place	2020 Altenberg	Four-man
Gold medal – first place	2021 Altenberg	Four-man
Gold medal – first place	2023 St. Moritz	Four-man
Silver medal – second place	2016 Igls	Four-man
European Championships
Gold medal – first place	2021 Winterberg	Four-man
Gold medal – first place	2024 Igls	Four-man
Silver medal – second place	2015 La Plagne	Four-man
Silver medal – second place	2018 Igls	Four-man
Silver medal – second place	2020 Winterberg	Four-man
Silver medal – second place	2023 Altenberg	Four-man
Bronze medal – third place	2019 Königssee	Four-man

Arndt "Candy" Bauer (born 31 July 1986) is a German bobsledder. He competed in the four-man event at the 2018 Winter Olympics winning the gold medal.
