= Ben Coakwell =

Canadian Olympic bobsledder (born 1987)

Personal information
- Full name: Benjamin Coakwell
- Born: June 25, 1987 (age 39) Regina, Saskatchewan, Canada
- Height: 178 cm (5 ft 10 in)
- Weight: 103 kg (227 lb)

Sport
- Country: Canada
- Sport: Bobsleigh
- Event: Four-man
- Turned pro: 2016
Medal record
Olympic Games
Bronze medal – third place	2022 Beijing	Four-man
World Championships
Bronze medal – third place	2019 Whistler	Four-man

Benjamin Coakwell (born June 25, 1987) is a Canadian Olympic bobsledder. He is a former Canadian football running back, who played CIS football with the Saskatchewan Huskies.

== Career ==
In January 2022, Coakwell was named to Canada's 2022 Olympic team, his third games. Coakwell would go onto win the bronze medal in the Four-man event.
