= Cam Stones =

Canadian bobsledder (born 1992)

Cameron Stones
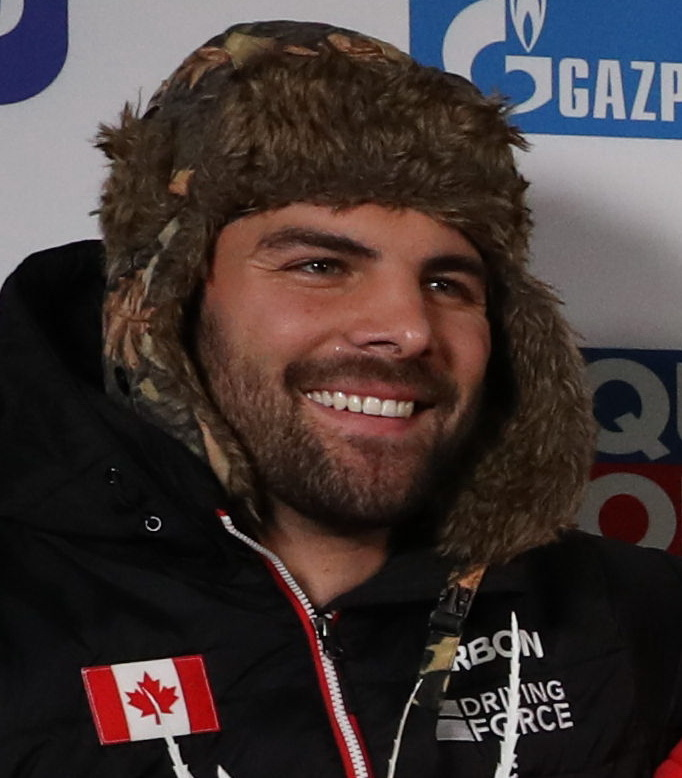
- Stones in 2019

Personal information
- Born: 5 January 1992 (age 34) Oshawa, Ontario, Canada
- Height: 1.90 m (6 ft 3 in)
- Weight: 105 kg (231 lb)

Sport
- Country: Canada
- Sport: Bobsleigh
- Event: Two-man
- Turned pro: 2015
Medal record
Olympic Games
Bronze medal – third place	2022 Beijing	Four-man
World Championships
Silver medal – second place	2019 Whistler	Two-man
Bronze medal – third place	2019 Whistler	Four-man

Cameron Stones (born 5 January 1992) is a Canadian bobsledder. He competed in the four-man event at the 2018 Winter Olympics.

In January 2022, Stones was named in Canada's 2022 Olympic team. Stones would go onto win the bronze medal in the Four-man event.

On August 25, 2022, Stones announced his retirement from the sport.
