= Ryan Sommer =

Canadian bobsledder (born 1993)

Personal information
- Nationality: Canadian
- Born: 27 August 1993 (age 32) White Rock, British Columbia, Canada
- Height: 1.81 m (5 ft 11 in)
- Weight: 103 kg (227 lb)

Sport
- Country: Canada
- Sport: Bobsleigh
- Event: Four-man
- Turned pro: 2016
Medal record
Olympic Games
Bronze medal – third place	2022 Beijing	Four-man
World Championships
Bronze medal – third place	2019 Whistler	Four-man

Ryan Sommer (born 27 August 1993) is a Canadian bobsledder.

== Career ==
He participated at the IBSF World Championships 2019, winning a medal in the four-man event.

In January 2022, Sommer was named to Canada's 2022 Olympic team. Sommer would go onto win the bronze medal in the Four-man event.

On August 25, 2022, Sommer announced his retirement from the sport.

== Personal life ==
Sommer is married to Canadian hockey player Blayre Turnbull.
