= Christian Rasp =

German bobsledder

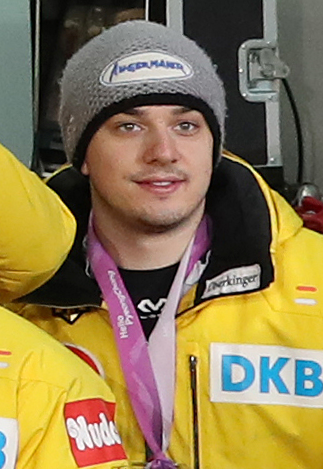
- Rasp in 2017

Personal information
- Nationality: German
- Born: 29 September 1989 (age 36) Ochsenfurt, West Germany
- Height: 1.82 m (6 ft 0 in)
- Weight: 98 kg (216 lb)

Sport
- Country: Germany
- Sport: Bobsleigh
- Event: Four-man
Medal record
Olympic Games
Silver medal – second place	2022 Beijing	Four-man
World Championships
Gold medal – first place	2017 Königssee	Four-man
Gold medal – first place	2017 Königssee	Mixed team
Silver medal – second place	2020 Altenberg	Four-man
Bronze medal – third place	2021 Altenberg	Four-man
European Championships
Gold medal – first place	2017 Winterberg	Four-man
Gold medal – first place	2018 Igls	Four-man
Gold medal – first place	2019 Königssee	Four-man
Gold medal – first place	2020 Winterberg	Four-man
Silver medal – second place	2019 Königssee	Two-man

Christian Rasp (born 29 September 1989) is a German bobsledder. He competed in the four-man event at the 2018 Winter Olympics.
