= IBSF World Championships 2019 – Two-woman =

Two-woman at the IBSF World Championships 2019
- Venue: Whistler Sliding Centre
- Location: Whistler, Canada
- Dates: March 2–3
- Competitors: 38 from 19 nations
- Teams: 19

Medalists
gold medal	Mariama Jamanka; Annika Drazek	Germany
silver medal	Stephanie Schneider; Ann-Christin Strack	Germany
bronze medal	Christine de Bruin; Kristen Bujnowski	Canada

The Two-woman competition at the IBSF World Championships 2019 was held on March 2 and 3, 2019.

== Results ==
Run 1 and 2 were started on March 2, at 11:30 and the last two runs on March 3 at 11:34.

Rank	Bib	Country	Athletes	Run 1	Rank	Run 2	Rank	Run 3	Rank	Run 4	Rank	Total	Behind
1st place, gold medalist(s)	4	Germany	Mariama Jamanka; Annika Drazek	52.58	2	52.64	1	52.01	1	52.85	6	3:30.08	
2nd place, silver medalist(s)	5	Germany	Stephanie Schneider; Ann-Christin Strack	52.84	3	52.85	2	52.78	5	52.67	2	3:31.14	+1.06
3rd place, bronze medalist(s)	15	Canada	Christine de Bruin; Kristen Bujnowski	52.91	4	53.12	5	52.57	3	52.65	1	3:31.25	+1.17
4	12	Austria	Katrin Beierl; Jennifer Onasanya	53.07	8	53.13	6	52.43	2	52.83	5	3:31.46	+1.38
5	10	United States	Brittany Reinbolt; Lauren Gibbs	53.04	6	53.02	4	52.61	4	52.98	7	3:31.65	+1.57
6	7	Russia	Nadezhda Sergeeva; Yulia Belomestnykh	53.11	10	53.31	9	52.94	7	52.75	4	3:32.11	+2.03
7	8	Germany	Anna Köhler; Leonie Fiebig	53.03	5	53.26	7	52.81	6	53.31	10	3:32.41	+2.33
8	11	Belgium	An Vannieuwenhuyse; Sara Aerts	53.22	11	53.31	9	53.04	8	53.01	8	3:32.58	+2.50
9	17	United States	Nicole Vogt; Nicole Brundgardt	53.23	12	53.38	11	53.53	12	52.73	3	3:32.87	+2.79
10	1	China	Huai Mingming; Wang Yameng	53.05	7	53.48	14	53.12	9	53.60	13	3:33.25	+3.17
11	2	Canada	Alysia Rissling; Cynthia Serwaah	53.08	9	53.27	8	53.53	12	53.42	11	3:33.30	+3.22
12	9	Great Britain	Mica McNeill; Montell Douglas	53.37	13	53.38	11	53.35	11	53.75	14	3:33.85	+3.77
13	3	China	Ying Qing; Tan Yinghui	53.46	15	53.76	16	53.21	10	53.55	12	3:33.98	+3.90
14	18	Canada	Kori Hol; Melissa Lotholz	53.68	17	53.65	15	53.59	14	53.27	9	3:34.19	+4.11
—	6	United States	Elana Meyers; Lake Kwaza	52.48	1	52.87	3	56.13	15	Did not start			
—	14	Russia	Lyubov Chernykh; Yulia Shokshueva	53.42	14	53.38	11	56.51	16	Did not start			
—	19	Russia	Alena Osipenko; Anna Parfenova	53.49	16	1:09.34	18	Did not start					
—	16	Switzerland	Martina Fontanive; Irina Strebel	54.03	18	1:06.28	17	Did not start					
—	13	Romania	Andreea Grecu; Teodora Vlad	55.61	19	Did not start							
