= 2019–20 Bobsleigh World Cup =

International bobsleigh competition

Winners
- Two-man: (Germany) Francesco Friedrich
- Four-man: (Germany) Francesco Friedrich
- Combined men's: (Germany) Francesco Friedrich
- Two-woman: (Germany) Stephanie Schneider

Competitions
- Venues: 7 (8 events)

The 2019–20 Bobsleigh World Cup was a multi-race series over a season for bobsleigh. The season started on 7 December 2019 in Lake Placid, USA and finished on 16 February 2020 in Sigulda, Latvia.

== Calendar ==
Below is the schedule of the 2019/20 season.

Venue	Date	Details
(United States) Lake Placid	7–8 December 2019	No Four-man race. Double race for Two-man.
(United States) Lake Placid	14–15 December 2019	No Two-man race. Double race for Four-man.
(Germany) Winterberg	3–4 January 2020	No Two-man race. Double race for Four-man. Also European Championships for Four-man (second race only).
(France) La Plagne	11–12 January 2020	
(Austria) Igls	18–19 January 2020	
(Germany) Königssee	25–26 January 2020	
(Switzerland) St. Moritz	1–2 February 2020	
(Latvia) Sigulda	14–16 February 2020	No Four-man race. Double race for Two-man. Also European Championships for Two-man (second race only) and Two-woman.
(Germany) Altenberg	21 February – 1 March 2020	World Championships

== Results ==
=== Two-man ===
Event:	Gold:	Time	Silver:	Time	Bronze:	Time
(United States) Lake Placid 1	Johannes Lochner; Florian Bauer; Germany	1:50.17 (54.94 / 55.23)	Francesco Friedrich; Thorsten Margis; Germany	1:50.25 (55.12 / 55.13)	Justin Kripps; Ben Coakwell; Canada	1:50.43 (55.24 / 55.19)
(United States) Lake Placid 2	Francesco Friedrich; Alexander Schüller; Germany	1:49.77 (54.96 / 54.81)	Johannes Lochner; Christian Rasp; Germany	1:50.00 (54.92 / 55.08)	Justin Kripps; Cameron Stones; Canada	1:50.34 (55.24 / 55.10)
(France) La Plagne	Francesco Friedrich; Alexander Schüller; Germany	1:58.52 (59.00 / 59.52)	Oskars Ķibermanis; Matīss Miknis; Latvia	1:58.78 (59.31 / 59.47)	Michael Vogt; Sandro Michel; Switzerland	1:58.86 (59.29 / 59.57)
(Austria) Igls	Francesco Friedrich; Thorsten Margis; Germany	1:43.87 (51.99 / 51.88)	Brad Hall; Greg Cackett; Great Britain	1:44.61 (52.22 / 52.39)	Richard Ölsner; Tobias Schneider; Germany	1:44.62 (52.15 / 52.47)
(Germany) Königssee	Francesco Friedrich; Thorsten Margis; Germany	1:38.66 (49.27 / 49.39)	Justin Kripps; Cameron Stones; Canada	1:39.17 (49.56 / 49.61)	Nico Walther; Malte Schwenzfeier; Germany	1:39.19 (49.54 / 49.65)
(Switzerland) St. Moritz	Johannes Lochner; Christopher Weber; Germany	2:14.19 (1:06.81 / 1:07.38)	Francesco Friedrich; Alexander Schüller; Germany	2:14.40 (1:07.14 / 1:07.26)	Oskars Ķibermanis; Matīss Miknis; Latvia	2:14.47 (1:07.18 / 1:07.29)
(Latvia) Sigulda 1	Oskars Ķibermanis; Matīss Miknis; Latvia	1:39.20 (49.53 / 49.67)	Francesco Friedrich; Martin Grothkopp; Germany	1:39.27 (49.52 / 49.75)	Justin Kripps; Ben Coakwell; Canada	1:39.53 (49.76 / 49.77)
(Latvia) Sigulda 2	Oskars Ķibermanis; Matīss Miknis; Latvia	1:39.18 (49.53 / 49.65)	Simon Friedli; Gregory Jones; Switzerland	1:39.54 (49.66 / 49.88)	Justin Kripps; Samuel Giguère; Canada	1:39.59 (49.78 / 49.81)

=== Four-man ===
Event:	Gold:	Time	Silver:	Time	Bronze:	Time
(United States) Lake Placid 1	Justin Kripps; Ryan Sommer; Cameron Stones; Ben Coakwell; Canada	1:49.50 (54.55 / 54.95)	Oskars Ķibermanis; Lauris Kaufmanis; Arvis Vilkaste; Matīss Miknis; Latvia	1:49.89 (54.72 / 55.17)	Benjamin Maier; Marco Rangl; Markus Sammer; Dănuț Moldovan; Austria	1:49.97 (54.84 / 55.13)
(United States) Lake Placid 2	Justin Kripps; Ryan Sommer; Cameron Stones; Ben Coakwell; Canada	1:49.45 (54.82 / 54.63)	Johannes Lochner; Florian Bauer; Christopher Weber; Christian Rasp; Germany	1:49.75 (54.98 / 54.77)	Francesco Friedrich; Candy Bauer; Martin Grothkopp; Thorsten Margis; Germany	1:49.78 (54.92 / 54.86)
(Germany) Winterberg 1	Francesco Friedrich; Candy Bauer; Alexander Schüller; Thorsten Margis; Germany	1:50.53 (55.64 / 54.89)	Nico Walther; Paul Krenz; Joshua Bluhm; Eric Franke; Germany	1:50.73 (55.50 / 55.23)	Oskars Ķibermanis; Lauris Kaufmanis; Arvis Vilkaste; Matīss Miknis; Latvia	1:50.93 (55.82 / 55.11)
(Germany) Winterberg 2	Johannes Lochner; Florian Bauer; Christopher Weber; Christian Rasp; Germany	1:50.54 (55.53 / 55.01)	Francesco Friedrich; Candy Bauer; Alexander Schüller; Thorsten Margis; Germany	1:50.56 (55.38 / 55.18)	Nico Walther; Paul Krenz; Kevin Korona; Eric Franke; Germany	1:50.76 (55.58 / 55.18)
(France) La Plagne	Francesco Friedrich; Candy Bauer; Alexander Schüller; Thorsten Margis; Germany	1:55.85 (57.85 / 58.00)	Johannes Lochner; Florian Bauer; Christopher Weber; Christian Rasp; Germany	1:56.06 (57.99 / 58.07)	Oskars Ķibermanis; Lauris Kaufmanis; Arvis Vilkaste; Matīss Miknis; Latvia	1:56.18 (58.01 / 58.17)
(Austria) Igls	Francesco Friedrich; Candy Bauer; Martin Grothkopp; Alexander Schüller; Germany	1:41.88 (50.92 / 50.96)	Johannes Lochner; Florian Bauer; Christopher Weber; Christian Rasp; Germany	1:42.21 (50.98 / 51.23)	Hunter Church; Joshua Williamson; James Reed; Kristopher Horn; United States	1:42.30 (51.11 / 51.19)
(Germany) Königssee	Francesco Friedrich; Candy Bauer; Martin Grothkopp; Alexander Schüller; Germany	1:37.03 (48.59 / 48.44)	Johannes Lochner; Benedikt Hertel; Christopher Weber; Florian Bauer; Germany	1:37.13 (48.55 / 48.58)	Justin Kripps; Ryan Sommer; Ben Coakwell; Cameron Stones; Canada	1:37.29 (48.63 / 48.66)
(Switzerland) St. Moritz	Justin Kripps; Ryan Sommer; Cameron Stones; Ben Coakwell; Canada	2:11.12 (1:05.56 / 1:05.56)	Oskars Ķibermanis; Lauris Kaufmanis; Arvis Vilkaste; Matīss Miknis; Latvia	2:11.25 (1:05.61 / 1:05.64)	Johannes Lochner; Florian Bauer; Christopher Weber; Tobias Schneider; Germany	2:11.46 (1:05.41 / 1:06.05)

=== Two-woman ===
Event:	Gold:	Time	Silver:	Time	Bronze:	Time
(United States) Lake Placid	Kaillie Humphries; Lauren Gibbs; United States	1:53.48 (56.70 / 56.78)	Stephanie Schneider; Lisette Thöne; Germany	1:53.79 (56.83 / 56.96)	Kim Kalicki; Vanessa Mark; Germany	1:53.92 (56.82 / 57.10)
(United States) Lake Placid	Kaillie Humphries; Lauren Gibbs; United States	1:54.03 (56.50 / 57.53)	Kim Kalicki; Erline Nolte; Germany	1:54.18 (56.63 / 57.55)	Christine de Bruin; Kristen Bujnowski; Canada	1:54.25 (56.73 / 57.52)
(Germany) Winterberg	Stephanie Schneider; Kira Lipperheide; Germany	1:55.46 (57.45 / 58.01)	Mariama Jamanka; Annika Drazek; Germany	1:55.50 (57.53 / 57.97)	Laura Nolte; Deborah Levi; Germany	1:55.59 (57.50 / 58.09)
(France) La Plagne	Laura Nolte; Deborah Levi; Germany	2:01.43 (1:00.67 / 1:00.76)	Christine de Bruin; Kristen Bujnowski; Canada	2:01.64 (1:00.72 / 1:00.92)	Stephanie Schneider; Leonie Fiebig; Germany	2:01.65 (1:00.91 / 1:00.74)
(Austria) Igls	Mariama Jamanka; Annika Drazek; Germany	1:47.34 (53.68 / 53.66)	Laura Nolte; Erline Nolte; Germany	1:47.53 (53.82 / 53.71)	Kaillie Humphries; Sylvia Hoffmann; United States	1:47.56 (53.69 / 53.87)
(Germany) Königssee	Kaillie Humphries; Sylvia Hoffmann; United States	1:41.57 (50.95 / 50.62)	Laura Nolte; Erline Nolte; Germany	1:42.60 (50.85 / 50.75)	Stephanie Schneider; Ann-Christin Strack; Germany	1:42.66 (50.97 / 50.69)
(Switzerland) St. Moritz	Kaillie Humphries; Lauren Gibbs; United States	2:17.18 (1:08.24 / 1:08.94)	Mariama Jamanka; Kira Lipperheide; Germany	2:17.34 (1:08.43 / 1:08.91)	Stephanie Schneider; Leonie Fiebig; Germany	2:17.35 (1:08.52 / 1:08.83)
(Latvia) Sigulda	Nadezhda Sergeeva; Elena Mamedova; Russia	1:41.96 (50.99 / 50.97)	Andreea Grecu; Ioana Gheorghe; Romania	1:41.98 (51.02 / 50.96)	Stephanie Schneider; Lisette Thöne; Germany	1:42.03 (51.06 / 50.97)

== Standings ==
=== Two-man ===
Pos.	Racer	(United States) LPL 1	(United States) LPL 2	(France) LPG	(Austria) IGL	(Germany) KON	(Switzerland) STM	(Latvia) SIG 1	(Latvia) SIG 2	Points
1	Francesco Friedrich (GER)	2	1	1	1	1	2	2	–	1530
2	Oskars Ķibermanis (LAT)	4	4	2	23	5	3	1	1	1478
3	Justin Kripps (CAN)	3	3	10	12	2	5	3	3	1466
4	Michael Vogt (SUI)	7	11	3	5	6	18	9	13	1216
5	Romain Heinrich (FRA)	9	12	9	6	12	9	15	6	1168
6	Won Yun-jong (KOR)	8	6	13	7	10	17	17	9	1096
7	Alexey Stulnev (RUS)	16	15	14	8	14	4	8	9	1088
8	Brad Hall (GBR)	–	–	4	2	6	8	5	12	1050
9	Dominik Dvořák (CZE)	13	16	6	9	10	15	7	DSQ	960
10	Hunter Church (USA)	5	5	12	10	17	12	–	–	856

=== Four-man ===
Pos.	Racer	(United States) LPL 1	(United States) LPL 2	(Germany) WIN 1	(Germany) WIN 2	(France) LPG	(Austria) IGL	(Germany) KON	(Switzerland) STM	Points
1	Francesco Friedrich (GER)	4	3	1	2	1	1	1	5	1686
2	Johannes Lochner (GER)	4	2	4	1	2	2	2	3	1649
3	Justin Kripps (CAN)	1	1	5	6	5	5	3	1	1603
4	Oskars Ķibermanis (LAT)	2	4	3	5	3	11	4	2	1524
5	Hunter Church (USA)	11	5	8	8	6	3	6	8	1352
6	Alexey Stulnev (RUS)	10	6	6	4	7	6	5	12	1344
7	Dominik Dvořák (CZE)	12	10	7	7	10	7	9	10	1216
8	Nico Walther (GER)	–	–	2	3	4	4	8	4	1146
9	Michael Vogt (SUI)	7	9	20	11	9	9	11	10	1108
10	Won Yun-jong (KOR)	15	12	14	12	12	7	18	13	968

=== Two-woman ===
Pos.	Racer	(United States) LPL 1	(United States) LPL 2	(Germany) WIN	(France) LPG	(Austria) IGL	(Germany) KON	(Switzerland) STM	(Latvia) SIG	Points
1	Stephanie Schneider (GER)	2	4	1	3	5	3	3	3	1611
2	Mariama Jamanka (GER)	4	5	2	5	1	6	2	4	1573
3	Christine de Bruin (CAN)	5	3	7	2	4	4	5	5	1514
4	Kaillie Humphries (USA)	1	1	4	4	3	1	1	–	1484
5	Nadezhda Sergeeva (RUS)	8	7	5	11	6	8	10	1	1353
6	Katrin Beierl (AUT)	12	12	8	9	7	5	7	6	1264
7	Martine Fontanive (SUI)	6	6	10	10	14	9	4	9	1248
8	Laura Nolte (GER)	–	–	3	1	2	2	6	–	1021
9	Lyubov Chernykh (RUS)	9	10	11	12	12	14	–	8	960
10	An Vannieuwenhuyse (BEL)	–	–	9	7	DNS	7	11	10	768

== Medal table ==
Rank	Nation	Gold	Silver	Bronze	Total
1	Germany	14	16	11	41
2	United States	4	0	2	6
3	Canada	3	2	6	11
4	Latvia	2	3	3	8
5	Russia	1	0	0	1
6	Switzerland	0	1	1	2
7	Great Britain	0	1	0	1
7	Romania	0	1	0	1
9	Austria	0	0	1	1
Totals (9 entries)		24	24	24	72
