= IBSF World Championships 2016 – Two-woman =

Two-woman bobsleigh at the IBSF World Championships 2016
- Venue: Olympic Sliding Centre Innsbruck, Igls
- Date: 12–13 February
- Competitors: 36 from 8 nations
- Teams: 18
- Winning time: 3:32.38

Medalists
gold medal	Anja Schneiderheinze-Stöckel; Annika Drazek	Germany
silver medal	Kaillie Humphries; Melissa Lotholz	Canada
bronze medal	Elana Meyers; Lauren Gibbs	United States

The Two-woman bobsleigh event in the IBSF World Championships 2016 was held on 12–13 February 2016.

== Results ==
The first two runs were started at 16:45 on 12 February 2016 and the last two runs at 15:00 on 13 February 2016.

Rank	Bib	Country	Athletes	Run 1	Run 2	Run 3	Run 4	Total	Behind
1st place, gold medalist(s)	5	Germany	Anja Schneiderheinze-Stöckel; Annika Drazek	52.94	53.13	53.12	53.19	3:32.38	
2nd place, silver medalist(s)	1	Canada	Kaillie Humphries; Melissa Lotholz	53.07	53.31	53.17	53.16	3:32.71	+0.33
3rd place, bronze medalist(s)	8	United States	Elana Meyers; Lauren Gibbs	53.04	53.36	53.32	53.15	3:32.87	+0.49
4	9	Germany	Stephanie Schneider; Lisa Marie Buckwitz	53.38	53.35	53.36	53.30	3:33.39	+1.01
5	2	United States	Jamie Greubel; Cherrelle Garrett	53.20	53.61	53.53	53.27	3:33.61	+1.23
6	3	Austria	Christina Hengster; Sanne Dekker	53.54	53.43	53.34	53.41	3:33.72	+1.34
7	7	Germany	Mariama Jamanka; Erline Nolte	53.39	53.60	53.59	53.44	3:34.02	+1.64
8	17	United States	Katie Eberling; Kehri Jones	53.48	53.58	53.75	53.49	3:34.30	+1.92
9	4	Belgium	Elfje Willemsen; Sophie Vercruyssen	53.41	53.77	53.76	53.67	3:34.61	+2.23
10	10	Russia	Aleksandra Rodionova; Nadezhda Viderker	53.67	53.68	53.79	53.50	3:34.64	+2.26
11	14	Russia	Nadezhda Sergeeva; Yulia Belomestnykh	53.58	53.84	53.82	53.70	3:34.94	+2.56
12	11	Great Britain	Mica McNeill; Natalie Deratt	53.62	53.74	53.86	53.75	3:34.97	+2.59
13	15	Canada	Alysia Rissling; Julia Corrente	53.67	53.97	54.00	53.67	3:35.31	+2.93
14	12	Romania	Maria Constantin; Andreea Grecu	53.67	53.98	54.07	53.80	3:35.52	+3.14
14	13	Austria	Katrin Beierl; Karlien Sleper	53.82	53.90	54.03	53.77	3:35.52	+3.14
16	16	Canada	Christine Debruin; Cynthia Appiah	53.85	54.06	53.98	53.77	3:35.66	+3.29
17	6	Belgium	An Vannieuwenhuyse; Loes Hubrecht	53.92	54.09	54.15	53.97	3:36.13	+3.75
18	18	Belgium	Lien de Decker; Nel Paulissen	54.39	54.54	54.47	54.27	3:37.67	+5.29
