= Bobsleigh at the 2022 Winter Olympics – Two-woman =

Bobsleigh two-woman at the XXIV Olympic Winter Games
- Bobsleigh
- Venue: Xiaohaituo Bobsleigh and Luge Track; Beijing
- Date: 18, 19 February 2022
- Competitors: 40 from 12 nations
- Teams: 20
- Winning time: 4:03.96

Medalists
1st place, gold medalist(s)		Laura Nolte; Deborah Levi	Germany
2nd place, silver medalist(s)		Mariama Jamanka; Alexandra Burghardt	Germany
3rd place, bronze medalist(s)		Elana Meyers Taylor; Sylvia Hoffman	United States

The two-woman competition in bobsleigh at the 2022 Winter Olympics was held on 18 February (heats 1 and 2) and 19 February (heats 3 and 4), at the Xiaohaituo Bobsleigh and Luge Track in Yanqing District of Beijing. Laura Nolte and Deborah Levi of Germany won the event, the first Olympic medal for them. Mariama Jamanka and Alexandra Burghardt, also of Germany, won the silver medal, and Elana Meyers Taylor and Sylvia Hoffman, of the United States, bronze.

Jamanka was the defending champion, Meyers Taylor and Kaillie Humphries were the 2018 silver and bronze medalists, respectively. All of them were competing, though in 2019 Humphries switched from Canada to the United States. Humphries was the 2021 World champion. Stephanie Schneider and Nolte were the silver and bronze medalists, respectively. Meyers Taylor was the winner of the 2021–22 Bobsleigh World Cup, ahead of Humphries.

In both runs of the first day, Nolte and Deborah Levi set track records. After two runs, they had advantage of half a second over Jamanka and Alexandra Burghardt, who were second in both runs. Meyers Taylor and Sylvia Hoffman were third in both runs, very close to Jamanka and Burghardt. In the third run, Nolte and Levi set the track record again, and even though they lost 0.01 in the fourth run to Jamanka and Burghardt, they won gold with the advantage of 0.77.

== Qualification ==
There was a quota of 20 sleds available for the women's two-women event. Qualification was based on the world rankings of the 2021/2022 season between 15 October 2020 and 16 January 2022. Pilots must have competed in six different races on three different tracks and be ranked in at least five of those races. Additionally, the pilot must been ranked among the top 50 for the man's events or top 40 for the women's events.

For the women's races the IBSF combined ranking will be used for the quotas involving multiple sleds. The top two nations in the two-women event earned three sleds each. The next four nations earned two sleds each, while the next six earned one sled each. The IBSF announced final quotas on January 24, 2022.

=== Summary ===
Sleds qualified	Countries	Athletes total	Nation
3	2	12	Germany; Canada
2	4	16	United States; China; ROC; Switzerland
1	6	12	Romania; Austria; Great Britain; Australia; Belgium; France
20	12	40	

== Results ==
Rank	Bib	Athletes	Country	Run 1	Rank	Run 2	Rank	Run 3	Rank	Run 4	Rank	Total	Behind
1st place, gold medalist(s)	4	Laura Nolte; Deborah Levi	Germany	1:01.04	1	1:01.01	1	1:00.70; TR	1	1:01.21	2	4:03.96	—N/a
2nd place, silver medalist(s)	9	Mariama Jamanka; Alexandra Burghardt	Germany	1:01.10	2	1:01.45	2	1:00.98	2	1:01.20	1	4:04.73	+0.77
3rd place, bronze medalist(s)	8	Elana Meyers Taylor; Sylvia Hoffman	United States	1:01.26	3	1:01.53	3	1:01.13	3	1:01.56	3	4:05.48	+1.52
4	5	Kim Kalicki; Lisa Buckwitz	Germany	1:01.61	6	1:01.78	5	1:01.30	4	1:01.59	5	4:06.28	+2.32
5	6	Christine de Bruin; Kristen Bujnowski	Canada	1:01.45	5	1:01.76	4	1:01.43	5	1:01.73	6	4:06.37	+2.41
6	11	Melanie Hasler; Nadja Pasternack	Switzerland	1:01.65	7	1:01.85	6	1:01.77	7	1:01.56	3	4:06.83	+2.87
7	7	Kaillie Humphries; Kaysha Love	United States	1:01.41	4	1:01.97	9	1:01.75	6	1:01.91	8	4:07.04	+3.08
8	13	Cynthia Appiah; Dawn Richardson Wilson	Canada	1:01.75	8	1:01.89	7	1:01.95	10	1:01.93	9	4:07.52	+3.56
9	10	Nadezhda Sergeeva; Yulia Belomestnykh	ROC	1:02.04	16	1:01.90	8	1:02.34	18	1:01.83	7	4:08.11	+4.15
10	16	Katrin Beierl; Jennifer Onasanya	Austria	1:01.91	13	1:02.12	12	1:01.89	9	1:02.32	16	4:08.24	+4.28
11	1	Huai Mingming; Wang Xuan	China	1:01.88	11	1:02.17	14	1:02.11	12	1:02.10	12	4:08.26	+4.30
12	12	Melissa Lotholz; Sara Villani	Canada	1:02.12	18	1:02.09	10	1:01.85	8	1:02.31	15	4:08.37	+4.41
13	3	Margot Boch; Carla Sénéchal	France	1:01.90	12	1:02.32	17	1:02.20	15	1:01.97	10	4:08.39	+4.43
14	15	Ying Qing; Du Jiani	China	1:01.92	14	1:02.19	15	1:02.29	17	1:02.09	11	4:08.49	+4.53
15	20	An Vannieuwenhuyse; Sara Aerts	Belgium	1:02.08	17	1:02.12	12	1:02.11	12	1:02.27	14	4:08.58	+4.62
16	19	Breeana Walker; Kiara Reddingius	Australia	1:01.98	15	1:02.11	11	1:02.04	11	1:02.51	20	4:08.64	+4.68
17	18	Mica McNeill; Montell Douglas	Great Britain	1:02.19	19	1:02.35	18	1:02.17	14	1:02.14	13	4:08.85	+4.89
18	14	Andreea Grecu; Katharina Wick	Romania	1:01.82	9	1:02.47	20	1:02.25	16	1:02.44	18	4:08.98	+5.02
19	2	Anastasiia Makarova; Elena Mamedova	ROC	1:01.83	10	1:02.29	16	1:02.48	20	1:02.49	19	4:09.09	+5.13
20	17	Martina Fontanive; Irina Strebel	Switzerland	1:02.48	20	1:02.35	18	1:02.35	19	1:02.41	17	4:09.59	+5.63
