= IBSF World Championships 2020 – Two-woman =

Two-woman at the IBSF World Championships 2020
- Venue: Altenberg bobsleigh, luge, and skeleton track
- Location: Altenberg, Germany
- Dates: 21–22 February
- Competitors: 40 from 13 nations
- Teams: 20
- Winning time: 3:45.49

Medalists
gold medal	Kaillie Humphries; Lauren Gibbs	United States
silver medal	Kim Kalicki; Kira Lipperheide	Germany
bronze medal	Christine de Bruin; Kristen Bujnowski	Canada

The Two-woman competition at the IBSF World Championships 2020 was held on 21 and 22 February 2020.

== Results ==
The first two runs were started on 21 February at 14:04. The last two runs were held on 22 February at 15:30.

Rank	Bib	Country	Athletes	Run 1	Rank	Run 2	Rank	Run 3	Rank	Run 4	Rank	Total	Behind
1st place, gold medalist(s)	5	United States	Kaillie Humphries; Lauren Gibbs	56.47	1	56.33	1	56.27	2	56.42	1	3:45.49	
2nd place, silver medalist(s)	18	Germany	Kim Kalicki; Kira Lipperheide	56.56	3	56.45	2	56.25	1	56.60	4	3:45.86	+0.37
3rd place, bronze medalist(s)	7	Canada	Christine de Bruin; Kristen Bujnowski	56.60	4	56.87	5	56.47	3	56.61	5	3:46.55	+1.06
4	6	Germany	Mariama Jamanka; Annika Drazek	56.86	7	56.58	3	56.48	4	56.77	8	3:46.69	+1.20
5	4	Germany	Stephanie Schneider; Leonie Fiebig	56.50	2	56.84	4	56.84	8	56.74	6	3:46.92	+1.43
6	8	Russia	Nadezhda Sergeeva; Elena Mamedova	56.80	5	57.09	10	56.77	7	56.57	2	3:47.23	+1.74
7	11	Switzerland	Martina Fontanive; Nadja Pasternack	57.20	12	56.90	6	56.62	6	56.57	2	3:47.29	+1.80
8	15	Great Britain	Mica McNeill; Montell Douglas	56.83	6	56.99	7	56.56	5	57.16	11	3:47.54	+2.05
9	10	Austria	Katrin Beierl; Jennifer Onasanya	57.00	8	57.04	9	56.96	9	56.76	7	3:47.76	+2.27
10	1	China	Ying Qing; Du Jiani	57.07	10	57.09	10	57.13	11	57.01	9	3:48.30	+2.81
11	13	Belgium	An Vannieuwenhuyse; Kelly Van Petegem	57.16	11	57.09	10	57.20	12	57.06	10	3:48.51	+3.02
12	14	China	Huai Mingming; Lu Chunyang	57.29	13	57.01	8	57.10	10	57.17	12	3:48.57	+3.08
13	2	Russia	Lyubov Chernykh; Anna Parfenova	57.50	14	57.22	13	57.37	13	57.18	13	3:49.27	+3.78
14	17	Australia	Breeana Walker; Stefanie Preiksa	57.68	15	57.96	14	57.56	14	57.42	14	3:50.62	+5.13
15	16	Switzerland	Melanie Hasler; Jasmin Näf	57.71	16	58.15	15	57.68	15	57.65	15	3:51.19	+5.70
16	20	Poland	Sylwia Smolarek; Aleksandra Byczkowska	59.35	18	58.65	16	58.37	16	58.02	16	3:54.39	+8.90
—	9	Germany	Laura Nolte; Ann-Christin Strack	57.04	9	1:05.52	17	Did not start					
—	19	Italy	Giada Andreutti; Silvia Taini	58.71	17	Disqualified							
—	3	Italy	Tania Vicenzino; Lucrezia Tavella	1:01.28	19	Did not start							
—	12	Romania	Andreea Grecu; Ioana Gheorghe	1:02.26	20	Did not start							
