= IBSF World Championships 2021 – Monobob =

Monobob at the IBSF World Championships 2021
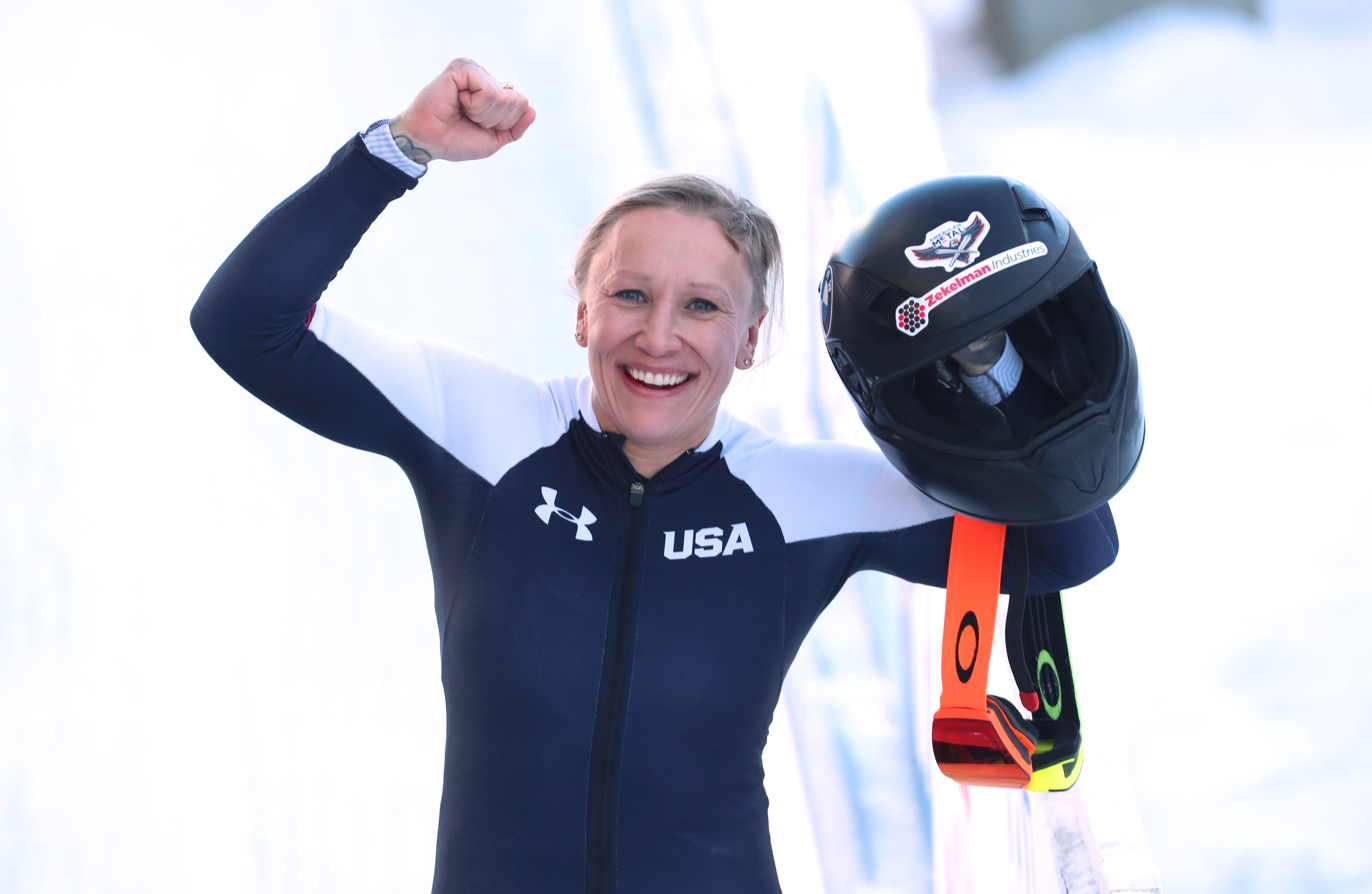
- 4th run Women's Monobob (Bobsleigh & Skeleton World Championships Altenberg 2021)
- Venue: Altenberg bobsleigh, luge, and skeleton track
- Location: Altenberg, Germany
- Dates: 13–14 February
- Competitors: 23 from 14 nations
- Winning time: 3:59.62

Medalists
gold medal	Kaillie Humphries	United States
silver medal	Stephanie Schneider	Germany
bronze medal	Laura Nolte	Germany

The Monobob competition at the IBSF World Championships 2021 was held on 13 and 14 February 2021. This was the introduction of the Women's Monobob event to the World Championships.

== Results ==
The first two runs were started on 13 February at 09:00 and the last two runs on 14 February at 09:00.

Rank	Bib	Athlete	Country	Run 1	Rank	Run 2	Rank	Run 3	Rank	Run 4	Rank	Total	Behind
1st place, gold medalist(s)	16	Kaillie Humphries	United States	1:00.39	4	1:00.17	1	59.59	1	59.47	1	3:59.62	
2nd place, silver medalist(s)	1	Stephanie Schneider	Germany	1:00.07	2	1:00.45	2	59.80	4	59.80	2	4:00.12	+0.50
3rd place, bronze medalist(s)	18	Laura Nolte	Germany	1:00.00	1	1:00.70	4	59.61	2	1:00.11	5	4:00.42	+0.80
4	11	Mariama Jamanka	Germany	1:00.46	5	1:00.55	3	59.81	5	1:00.02	3	4:00.84	+1.22
5	13	Cynthia Appiah	Canada	1:00.53	6	1:00.79	6	59.62	3	1:00.34	9	4:01.28	+1.66
6	15	Kim Kalicki	Germany	1:00.24	3	1:00.84	7	1:00.06	7	1:00.27	7	4:01.41	+1.79
7	8	Melissa Lotholz	Canada	1:01.11	11	1:00.76	5	59.91	6	1:00.43	11	4:02.21	+2.59
8	14	Katrin Beierl	Austria	1:01.34	13	1:00.90	8	1:00.17	8	1:00.10	4	4:02.51	+2.89
9	10	Martina Fontanive	Switzerland	1:00.55	7	1:01.08	10	1:00.63	12	1:00.39	10	4:02.65	+3.03
10	12	Melanie Hasler	Switzerland	1:01.10	10	1:01.24	15	1:00.18	9	1:00.52	12	4:03.04	+3.42
11	5	Andreea Grecu	Romania	1:01.07	9	1:01.26	16	1:00.54	11	1:00.28	8	4:03.15	+3.53
12	6	Nadezhda Sergeeva	Bobsleigh Federation of Russia	1:01.23	12	1:01.20	14	1:00.76	14	1:00.16	6	4:03.35	+3.73
13	7	Mica McNeill	Great Britain	1:00.89	8	1:01.08	10	1:00.65	13	1:00.90	14	4:03.52	+3.90
14	2	Kim Yoo-ran	South Korea	1:01.38	14	1:01.17	12	1:00.83	15	1:00.66	13	4:04.04	+4.42
15	9	Elana Meyers	United States	1:03.14	22	1:00.94	9	1:00.42	10	1:00.94	15	4:05.44	+5.82
16	3	Christine de Bruin	Canada	1:01.56	16	1:01.87	19	1:00.89	16	1:01.27	17	4:05.59	+5.97
17	22	Lyubov Chernykh	Bobsleigh Federation of Russia	1:02.18	19	1:01.30	17	1:01.09	17	1:01.22	16	4:05.79	+6.17
18	20	Viktória Čerňanská	Slovakia	1:02.13	18	1:01.99	20	1:01.59	18	1:01.36	18	4:07.07	+7.45
19	17	Anastasiia Makarova	Bobsleigh Federation of Russia	1:01.92	17	1:01.70	18	1:03.20	23	1:01.37	19	4:08.19	+8.57
20	19	An Vannieuwenhuyse	Belgium	1:02.20	20	1:03.18	23	1:01.89	19	Did not advance			
21	21	Lidiia Hunko	Ukraine	1:03.26	23	1:02.84	21	1:02.00	20	Did not advance			
22	23	Sylwia Smolarek	Poland	1:02.60	21	1:03.12	22	1:02.82	22	Did not advance			
	4	Breeana Walker	Australia	1:01.46	15	1:01.17	12	1:02.58	21	Did not start			
