= FIBT World Championships 2015 – Two-woman =

Two-woman at the FIBT World Championships 2015
- Venue: Winterberg bobsleigh, luge, and skeleton track, Winterberg
- Date: 26–28 February 2015
- Competitors: 34 from 17 nations
- Winning time: 3:46.47

Medalists
gold medal	Elana Meyers; Cherrelle Garrett	United States
silver medal	Anja Schneiderheinze-Stöckel; Annika Drazek	Germany
bronze medal	Cathleen Martini; Stephanie Schneider	Germany

FIBT World Championships 2015 /
Two	men		women
Four	men
Skeleton	men		women
Mixed		team

The Two-woman event of the FIBT World Championships 2015 was held on 26–28 February 2015.

== Results ==
The first two runs were started on 26 February at 14:45 and the last two runs on 28 February at 13:30.

Rank	Bib	Country	Athletes	Run 1	Run 2	Run 3	Run 4	Total	Behind
1st place, gold medalist(s)	2	United States	Elana Meyers; Cherrelle Garrett	56.65	56.64	56.62	56.56	3:46.47	
2nd place, silver medalist(s)	4	Germany	Anja Schneiderheinze-Stöckel; Annika Drazek	57.00	56.68	56.68	56.54	3:46.90	+0.43
3rd place, bronze medalist(s)	7	Germany	Cathleen Martini; Stephanie Schneider	56.82	56.99	56.83	56.89	3:47.53	+1.06
4	8	Germany	Stefanie Szczurek; Erline Nolte	57.12	56.97	57.09	56.86	3:48.04	+1.57
5	1	United States	Jamie Greubel; Lauren Gibbs	57.36	57.01	56.94	56.79	3:48.10	+1.63
6	5	United States	Jazmine Fenlator; Natalie Deratt	57.15	56.99	57.09	57.10	3:48.33	+1.86
7	6	Belgium	Elfje Willemsen; Sophie Vercruyssen	57.10	57.01	57.35	57.16	3:48.62	+2.15
7	3	Canada	Kaillie Humphries; Melissa Lotholz	57.37	57.03	57.14	57.08	3:48.62	+2.15
9	14	Romania	Maria Constantin; Andreea Grecu	57.40	57.23	57.45	57.19	3:49.27	+2.80
10	17	Germany	Miriam Wagner; Lisa Buckwitz	57.46	57.28	57.28	57.35	3:49.37	+2.90
11	9	Austria	Christina Hengster; Sanne Dekker	57.55	57.43	57.30	57.41	3:49.69	+3.22
12	13	Russia	Aleksandra Rodionova; Nadezhda Paleeva	57.53	57.58	57.32	57.36	3:49.79	+3.32
13	10	Russia	Nadezhda Sergeeva; Yulia Shokshueva	57.73	57.64	57.35	57.48	3:50.20	+3.73
14	11	Great Britain	Mica McNeill; Aleasha Kiddle	57.58	57.53	57.58	57.67	3:50.36	+3.89
15	12	Great Britain	Victoria Olaoye; Nikki McSweeney	57.93	57.61	57.59	57.56	3:50.69	+4.22
16	16	Netherlands	Marije van Huigenbosch; Melissa Boekelman	57.80	57.68	57.60	57.67	3:50.75	+4.28
17	15	Belgium	An Vannieuwenhuyse; Lies Defreyne	57.86	57.72	57.80	58.19	3:51.57	+5.10
