= Bobsleigh at the 2018 Winter Olympics – Two-woman =

Two-Man Women's at the XXIII Olympic Winter Games
- Venue: Alpensia Sliding Centre near Pyeongchang, South Korea
- Dates: 20–21 February 2018
- Competitors: 40 from 12 nations
- Winning time: 3:22.45

Medalists
1st place, gold medalist(s)		Mariama Jamanka; Lisa Buckwitz	Germany
2nd place, silver medalist(s)		Elana Meyers Taylor; Lauren Gibbs	United States
3rd place, bronze medalist(s)		Kaillie Humphries; Phylicia George	Canada

The two-man women's bobsleigh competition at the 2018 Winter Olympics was held on 20 and 21 February at the Alpensia Sliding Centre near Pyeongchang, South Korea.

== Qualification ==
The top two countries in the 2017–18 Bobsleigh season (including the World Cup, Europe races and Americas Cup) were awarded the maximum three sleds. The next four countries were awarded two sleds each. The remaining six sleds were awarded to six countries, with Australia being awarded an Oceania continental quota, Nigeria being awarded with the African quota and South Korea being awarded a slot as host nation.

== Results ==
The first two runs were held on 20 February and the last runs on 21 February 2018.

Rank	Bib	Country	Athletes	Run 1	Run 2	Run 3	Run 4	Total	Behind
1st place, gold medalist(s)	6	Germany	Mariama Jamanka; Lisa Buckwitz	50.54	50.72	50.49	50.70	3:22.45	—N/a
2nd place, silver medalist(s)	5	United States	Elana Meyers Taylor; Lauren Gibbs	50.52	50.81	50.46; TR	50.73	3:22.52	+0.07
3rd place, bronze medalist(s)	4	Canada	Kaillie Humphries; Phylicia George	50.72	50.88	50.52	50.77	3:22.89	+0.44
4	8	Germany	Stephanie Schneider; Annika Drazek	50.63	50.93	50.71	50.70	3:22.97	+0.52
5	7	United States	Jamie Greubel Poser; Aja Evans	50.59	50.99	50.59	50.85	3:23.02	+0.57
6	9	Canada	Alysia Rissling; Heather Moyse	50.81	50.95	50.83	51.04	3:23.63	+1.18
7	13	Canada	Christine de Bruin; Melissa Lotholz	50.94	50.91	50.75	51.29	3:23.89	+1.44
8	17	Great Britain	Mica McNeill; Mica Moore	50.77	50.95	51.16	51.19	3:24.07	+1.62
9	12	Switzerland	Sabina Hafner; Rahel Rebsamen	50.86	51.16	51.07	51.21	3:24.30	+1.85
10	14	Austria	Christina Hengster; Valerie Kleiser	51.23	51.04	51.00	51.24	3:24.51	+2.06
11	15	Belgium	Elfje Willemsen; Sara Aerts	51.03	51.27	51.10	51.21	3:24.61	+2.16
12	20	Belgium	An Vannieuwenhuyse; Sophie Vercruyssen	51.24	51.28	51.53	51.20	3:25.25	+2.80
13	10	Germany	Anna Köhler; Erline Nolte	51.21	51.20	51.46	51.41	3:25.28	+2.83
14	1	South Korea	Kim Yoo-ran; Kim Min-seong	51.24	51.20	51.32	51.55	3:25.31	+2.86
15	19	Romania	Maria Constantin; Andreea Grecu	51.17	51.40	51.39	51.57	3:25.53	+3.08
16	3	Olympic Athletes from Russia	Alexandra Rodionova; Yulia Belomestnykh	51.29	51.47	51.41	51.55	3:25.72	+3.27
17	16	Austria	Katrin Beierl; Victoria Hahn	51.49	51.41	51.51	51.43	3:25.84	+3.39
18	18	Jamaica	Jazmine Fenlator-Victorian; Carrie Russell	51.29	51.50	51.83	51.32	3:25.94	+3.49
19	2	Nigeria	Seun Adigun; Akuoma Omeoga (Run 1-2); Ngozi Onwumere (Run 3-4)	52.21	52.55	52.31	52.53	3:29.60	+7.15
DSQ	11	Olympic Athletes from Russia	Nadezhda Sergeeva; Anastasia Kocherzhova	~~51.01~~	~~51.49~~	~~51.29~~	~~51.37~~	~~3:25.16~~	~~+2.71~~

With Mariama Jamanka (1st), Elana Meyers Taylor & Lauren Gibbs (2nd) and Phylicia George (3rd) all making the podium, it marked the first time in Winter Olympic history that black athletes won gold, silver and bronze medals in the same event.
