= Bobsleigh at the 2022 Winter Olympics – Women's monobob =

Bobsleigh women's monobob at the XXIV Olympic Winter Games
- Bobsleigh
- Venue: Xiaohaituo Bobsleigh and Luge Track; Beijing
- Date: 13, 14 February 2022
- Competitors: 20 from 16 nations
- Winning time: 4:19.27

Medalists
1st place, gold medalist(s)		Kaillie Humphries	United States
2nd place, silver medalist(s)		Elana Meyers Taylor	United States
3rd place, bronze medalist(s)		Christine de Bruin	Canada

The women's monobob competition in bobsleigh at the 2022 Winter Olympics was held on 13 February (heats 1 and 2) and 14 February (heats 3 and 4), at the Xiaohaituo Bobsleigh and Luge Track in Yanqing District of Beijing. This was the inaugural monobob competition at the Olympics. Kaillie Humphries of the United States won the event. She was the 2018 two-woman bobsleigh champion, but at that time she represented Canada. Elana Meyers Taylor, also of the United States, won the silver medal, and Christine de Bruin of Canada bronze, her first Olympic medal.

In July 2018, the International Olympic Committee (IOC) officially added the women's monobob event to the program, increasing the total number of events to four.

In the first day of competition, Humphries won both runs and developed an advantage over the second place, Christine de Bruin, with over a second. She won Run 3 as well, and was the third in the last run, which was sufficient for the gold medal. De Bruin dropped to third, and Meyers Taylor won the last run and guaranteed the silver medal.

== Qualification ==
There was a quota of 20 sleds available for the women's mono-bob event. Qualification was based on the world rankings of the 2021/2022 season between 15 October 2020 and 16 January 2022. Pilots must have competed in six different races on three different tracks and been ranked in at least five of those races. Additionally, the pilot must been ranked among the top 50 for the man's events or top 40 for the women's events.

For the women's races the IBSF combined ranking will be used for the quotas involving multiple sleds, and for the first six individual quotas in monobob. This meant the first 14 quotas were allocated to athletes already qualified in the two-woman event, with the six individual quotas awarded using the mono-bob ranking. The top four nations in the two-women event earned two quotas each. The next eight slots were awarded to the next eight best ranked NOC's in the two-woman event, while the last six were awarded in through the top six non-qualified athletes in the monobob ranking. The IBSF announced final quotas on 24 January 2022.

=== Summary ===
Sleds qualified	Countries	Athletes total	Nation
2	4	8	United States; Germany; Canada; China
1	12	12	ROC; Switzerland; Romania; Austria; ~~Great Britain~~; Australia; Netherlands; South Korea; France; Slovakia; Jamaica; Ukraine; Italy
20	16	20	

== Results ==
Rank	Bib	Athlete	Country	Run 1	Rank	Run 2	Rank	Run 3	Rank	Run 4	Rank	Total	Behind
1st place, gold medalist(s)	5	Kaillie Humphries	United States	1:04.44	1	1:04.66	1	1:04.87	1	1:05.30	3	4:19.27	—N/a
2nd place, silver medalist(s)	4	Elana Meyers Taylor	United States	1:05.12	3	1:05.30	3	1:05.28	3	1:05.11	1	4:20.81	+1.54
3rd place, bronze medalist(s)	7	Christine de Bruin	Canada	1:05.12	3	1:05.02	2	1:05.38	4	1:05.51	5	4:21.03	+1.76
4	9	Laura Nolte	Germany	1:04.74	2	1:05.58	7	1:05.70	6	1:05.31	4	4:21.33	+2.06
5	8	Bree Walker	Australia	1:05.55	10	1:05.54	6	1:05.16	2	1:05.21	2	4:21.46	+2.19
6	2	Huai Mingming	China	1:05.18	6	1:05.72	9	1:05.71	7	1:05.97	8	4:22.58	+3.31
7	12	Melanie Hasler	Switzerland	1:05.18	6	1:05.86	11	1:06.21	13	1:05.56	6	4:22.81	+3.54
8	6	Cynthia Appiah	Canada	1:05.75	12	1:05.53	5	1:05.78	8	1:05.98	9	4:23.04	+3.77
9	13	Ying Qing	China	1:05.16	5	1:05.99	12	1:05.82	9	1:06.44	14	4:23.41	+4.14
10	10	Nadezhda Sergeeva	ROC	1:05.45	9	1:06.00	13	1:05.83	10	1:06.31	11	4:23.59	+4.32
11	17	Margot Boch	France	1:05.77	14	1:05.51	4	1:06.01	12	1:06.53	16	4:23.82	+4.55
12	14	Andreea Grecu	Romania	1:05.56	11	1:05.71	8	1:06.46	15	1:06.26	10	4:23.99	+4.72
13	11	Mariama Jamanka	Germany	1:05.85	15	1:06.94	17	1:05.47	5	1:05.74	7	4:24.00	+4.73
14	16	Katrin Beierl	Austria	1:05.39	8	1:06.00	13	1:06.57	16	1:06.56	17	4:24.52	+5.25
15	20	Giada Andreutti	Italy	1:06.07	17	1:05.77	10	1:06.57	16	1:06.38	12	4:24.79	+5.52
16	15	Karlien Sleper	Netherlands	1:05.88	16	1:06.59	16	1:05.85	11	1:06.65	18	4:24.97	+5.70
17	18	Viktória Čerňanská	Slovakia	1:05.75	12	1:06.41	15	1:06.62	18	1:06.47	15	4:25.25	+5.98
18	1	Kim Yoo-ran	South Korea	1:06.68	20	1:07.02	18	1:06.41	14	1:06.41	13	4:26.52	+7.25
19	19	Jazmine Fenlator-Victorian	Jamaica	1:06.63	19	1:07.38	19	1:06.92	19	1:07.63	20	4:28.56	+9.29
20	3	Lidiia Hunko	Ukraine	1:06.34	18	1:07.84	20	1:07.47	20	1:07.45	19	4:29.10	+9.83
