= Bobsleigh at the 2026 Winter Olympics – Women's monobob =

Bobsleigh women's monobob at the XXV Olympic Winter Games
- Bobsleigh
- Venue: Cortina Sliding Centre; Cortina d'Ampezzo
- Date: 15, 16 February 2026
- Competitors: 25 from 17 nations
- Winning time: 3:57.93

Medalists
1st place, gold medalist(s)		Elana Meyers Taylor	United States
2nd place, silver medalist(s)		Laura Nolte	Germany
3rd place, bronze medalist(s)		Kaillie Humphries	United States

The women's monobob competition in bobsleigh at the 2026 Winter Olympics was held on 15 February (heats 1 and 2) and 16 February (heats 3 and 4), at the Cortina Sliding Centre in Cortina d'Ampezzo. Elana Meyers Taylor of the United States won the event and became a first-time Olympic champion. Laura Nolte of Germany won the silver medal, and Kaillie Armbruster Humphries of the United States won bronze.

== Background ==
The defending champion, Kaillie Humphries, qualified for the event, as did the 2022 silver medalist Elana Meyers Taylor. The bronze medalist, Christine de Bruin, sat out a doping ban and did not qualify for the 2026 Olympics. Laura Nolte won the 2025–26 Bobsleigh World Cup, followed in the standings by Breeana Walker and Lisa Buckwitz. Kaysha Love was the 2025 World champion.

== Qualification ==
=== Summary ===
Sleds qualified	Countries	Athletes total	Nation
3	2	6	Germany; United States
2	4	8	Canada; China; Italy; Switzerland
1	11	11	Australia; Austria; Belgium; Chinese Taipei; Denmark; France; Great Britain; Jamaica; Poland; Slovakia; South Korea
25	17	25	

== Results ==
Rank	Bib	Athlete	Country	Run 1	Rank	Run 2	Rank	Run 3	Rank	Run 4	Rank	Total	Behind
1st place, gold medalist(s)	10	Elana Meyers Taylor	United States	59.49	2	59.85	4	59.08 TR	1	59.51	2	3:57.93	—
2nd place, silver medalist(s)	1	Laura Nolte	Germany	59.44	1	59.68	2	59.15	4	59.70	9	3:57.97	+0.04
3rd place, bronze medalist(s)	4	Kaillie Humphries	United States	59.78	4	59.65	1	59.08 TR	1	59.54	3	3:58.05	+0.12
4	3	Lisa Buckwitz	Germany	1:00.06	7	59.98	6	59.11	3	59.67	7	3:58.82	+0.89
5	8	Melanie Hasler	Switzerland	59.98	5	59.92	5	59.72	9	59.37	1	3:58.99	+1.06
6	6	Melissa Lotholz	Canada	1:00.38	14	59.84	3	59.39	6	59.63	6	3:59.24	+1.31
7	9	Kaysha Love	United States	59.54	3	1:00.47	15	59.21	5	1:00.05	16	3:59.27	+1.34
8	2	Breeana Walker	Australia	1:00.19	11	1:00.01	7	59.60	7	59.69	8	3:59.49	+1.56
9	14	Maja Voigt	Denmark	1:00.10	8	1:00.16	8	59.70	8	59.89	12	3:59.85	+1.92
10	11	Margot Boch	France	1:00.02	6	1:00.30	11	59.79	10	59.84	11	3:59.95	+2.02
11	12	Debora Annen	Switzerland	1:00.55	17	1:00.32	13	1:00.16	14	59.73	10	4:00.76	+2.83
12	23	Ying Qing	China	1:00.28	12	1:00.31	12	1:00.37	16	1:00.13	18	4:01.09	+3.16
13	7	Cynthia Appiah	Canada	1:00.11	9	1:00.18	9	1:01.23	24	59.61	5	4:01.13	+3.20
14	20	Mica Moore	Jamaica	1:00.55	17	1:00.43	14	1:00.41	17	59.92	13	4:01.31	+3.38
15	13	Kim Kalicki	Germany	1:00.14	10	1:00.98	23	1:00.62	21	59.59	4	4:01.33	+3.40
16	21	Huai Mingming	China	1:00.41	15	1:01.00	24	59.95	11	59.98	14	4:01.34	+3.41
17	17	Linda Weiszewski	Poland	1:00.77	20	1:00.66	17	1:00.11	13	1:00.00	15	4:01.54	+3.61
18	16	Adele Nicoll	Great Britain	1:00.54	16	1:00.29	10	1:00.00	12	1:01.03	20	4:01.86	+3.93
19	24	Kelly Van Petegem	Belgium	1:01.14	24	1:00.50	16	1:00.42	18	1:00.10	17	4:02.16	+4.23
20	19	Viktória Čerňanská	Slovakia	1:00.83	21	1:00.81	20	1:00.55	20	1:00.65	19	4:02.84	+4.91
21	15	Lin Sin-rong	Chinese Taipei	1:00.61	19	1:01.30	25	1:00.36	15	Did not advance		3:02.27	—
22	18	Kim Yoo-ran	South Korea	1:00.96	22	1:00.90	22	1:00.51	19	Did not advance		3:02.37	—
23	22	Simona de Silvestro	Italy	1:01.04	23	1:00.80	19	1:00.68	22	Did not advance		3:02.52	—
24	25	Giada Andreutti	Italy	1:01.21	25	1:00.76	18	1:01.10	23	Did not advance		3:03.07	—
	5	Katrin Beierl	Austria	1:00.34	13	1:00.82	21	Did not start		Did not advance		—	—
