= Rahel Rebsamen =

Swiss bobsledder (born 1994)

Personal information
- Nationality: Swiss
- Born: 8 April 1994 (age 30)

Sport
- Sport: Bobsleigh

Rahel Rebsamen (born 8 April 1994) is a Swiss bobsledder. She competed in the two-woman event at the 2018 Winter Olympics.
