= 2017 IBSF Junior Bobsleigh World Championships =

The 2017 IBSF Junior Bobsleigh World Championships took place at the Winterberg bobsleigh, luge, and skeleton track in Winterberg, Germany, from 27 to 29 January 2017.

== Schedule ==
Three events were held.

All times are local (UTC+1).

Date	Time	Events
28 February	11:00	2-man Bobsleigh / Women's Bobsleigh
29 February	10:00	4-man Bobsleigh

=== Bobsleigh ===
Event	Gold		Silver		Bronze	
Two-man	Richard Oelsner/Alexander Schüeller; Germany	1:50.87	Pablo Nolte/Christopher Weber; Germany	1:50.93 +0.06	Bennet Buchmüller/Niklas Scherer; Germany	1:51.12 +0.25
Four-man	Bennet Buchmueller/Benedikt Hertel/Niklas Scherer/Costa-Tonga Laurenz; Germany	1:49.67	Christoph Hafer/Michael Salzer/Paul Krenz/Markus Reichle; Germany	1:49.74 +0.07	Dmitriy Popov/Andrey Kazantsev/Ivan Kardakov/Mikhail Mordasov; Russia	1:49.82 +0.15
Two-woman	Mica McNeill/Mica Moore; United Kingdom	1:53.96	Anna Koehler/Franziska Fritz; Germany	1:54.54 +0.58	Kim Kalicki/Lisa-Sophie Gericke; Germany	1:54.74 +0.78
