= Valerie Kleiser =

Austrian bobsledder (born 1993)

Personal information
- Nationality: Austrian
- Born: 11 January 1993 (age 32)

Sport
- Sport: Bobsleigh

Valerie Kleiser (born 11 January 1993) is an Austrian bobsledder. She competed in the two-woman event at the 2018 Winter Olympics.
