= Mica Moore =

British-Jamaican bobsledder and sprinter

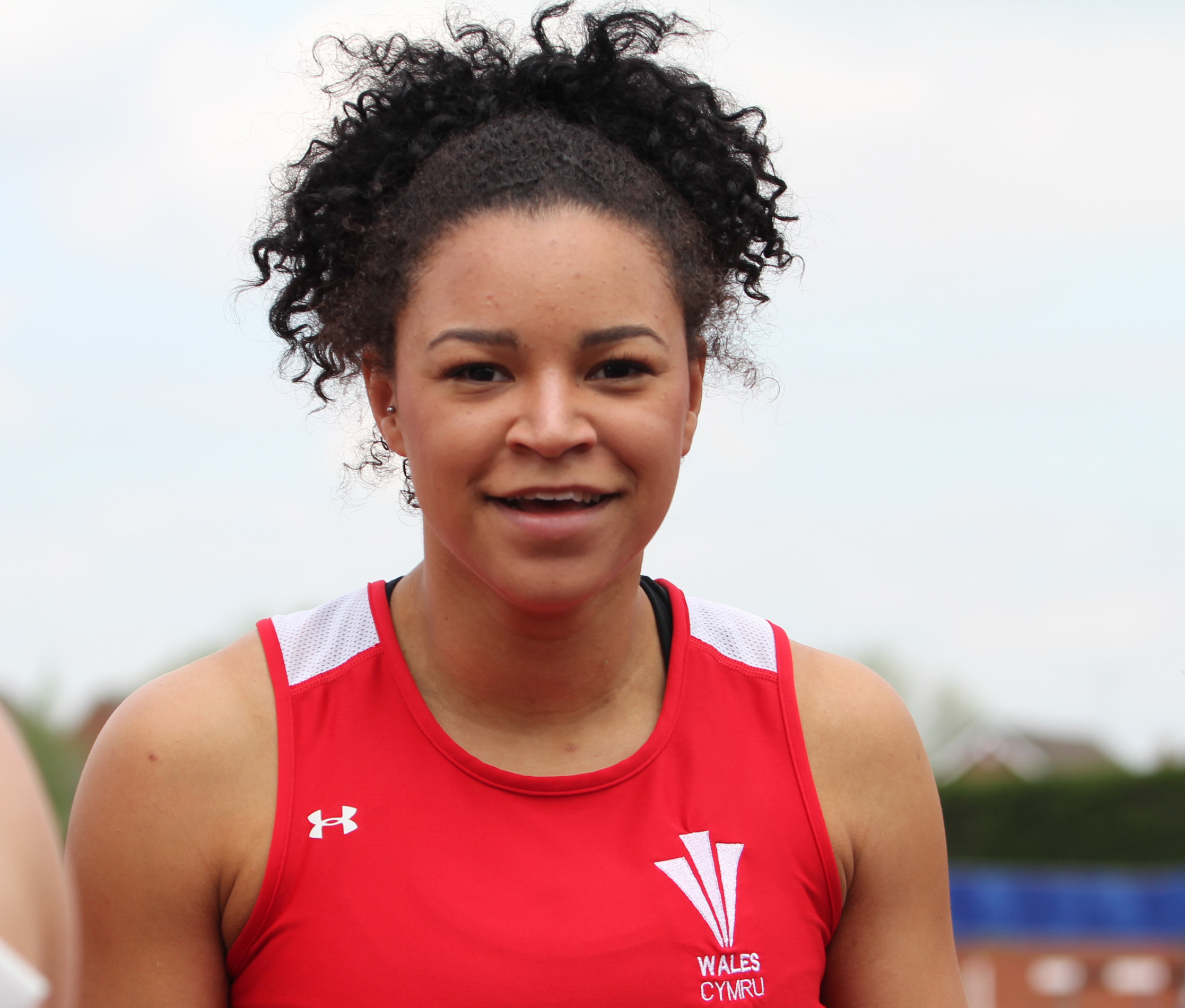

Personal information
- Citizenship: British, Jamaican
- Born: 23 November 1992 (age 33)
- Education: Cardiff Metropolitan University
- Years active: 2008–c. 2020 (sprinting); 2016–2018, 2021–2022, 2025–present (bobsleigh)

Sport
- Country: Wales (2008–c. 2020); Great Britain (2016–2022); Jamaica (2025–present)
- Sport: Sprinting; Bobsleigh
- University team: Cardiff Metropolitan University
- Club: Birchfield Harriers

Achievements and titles
- Olympic finals: 2018
- Commonwealth finals: 2014
Medal record
Representing Great Britain
Junior Bobsleigh World Championships
Gold medal – first place	2017 Winterberg	2-woman
Representing Jamaica
Pan American Championships
Silver medal – second place	2026 Lake Placid	Two-woman
Bronze medal – third place	2026 Lake Placid	Monobob

Mica Moore (born 23 November 1992) is a Welsh and Jamaican bobsleigher and former women's sprinter. She competed for Wales in the 4 × 100 metres relay at the 2014 Commonwealth Games in Glasgow, Scotland, and competed for Great Britain in the 2-women bobsleigh event at the 2018 Winter Olympics in Pyeongchang, South Korea. In 2025, Moore began competing for Jamaica in bobsleigh, after having left the British bobsleigh programme in 2022.

== Athletics career ==
Moore began her sporting career as a sprinter, running for Birchfield Harriers and Cardiff Metropolitan University. Moore was coached by her father Lawrence.

In May 2008, Moore won the 100m and 200m events at the under-17 Wales National Championships. Her mother Lolita Moore won the 100m and 200m Masters events at the same event. In May 2014, Moore, Hannah Thomas, Hannah Brier and Rachel Johncock broke the Welsh 4 × 100 metres relay national record at the Loughborough International event. In the same month, she won a bronze medal in the 100m event and a silver medal in the 4 × 100 metres relay event at the British Universities and Colleges Sport Outdoor Championships. Moore competed for Wales in the 4 × 100 metres relay at the 2014 Commonwealth Games in Glasgow, Scotland, finishing seventh in the final. The team consisted of Moore, Thomas, Brier and Johncock. Moore won the 100m event at the 2017 Welsh Athletics Championships. Moore failed to reach the qualifying standard for the 2018 Commonwealth Games in Gold Coast, Queensland, Australia.

At the 2019 Welsh Athletics Championships, Moore came second in the 100m event. At the 2020 British Indoor Athletics Championships, Moore came fourth in the 60m event, and fifth in the 200m race, in a season's best time.

== Bobsleigh career ==
In November 2016, after failing to reach the 2018 Commonwealth Games qualifying standard in a qualifying event, Moore decided to take up bobsleigh in addition to sprinting. In January 2017, Moore and Mica McNeill won the 2-women event at the 2017 IBSF Junior Bobsleigh World Championships in Winterberg, Germany. Later in the year, the British Bobsleigh and Skeleton Association withdrew funding for Moore and McNeill, after deciding to maintain funding only for the British male bobsleigh teams. The pair then managed to crowdfund £30,000, allowing them to compete in the 2017–18 Bobsleigh World Cup events. The money was needed to pay for travel between races for the pair of them, transport of the sled, race fees, insurance and possible medical expenses, among other things, and allowed them to concentrate on trying to win races. By January 2018, McNeill and Moore had raised over £41,000 to fund their competitions. The pair had the slogan "Powered By The People" written on their sled. Moore and McNeill finished fifth in the 2-women bobsleigh event in Whistler, Canada, which was the best result for a British women's team in the Bobsleigh World Cup for eight years.

In January 2018, Moore was selected to compete in the 2-women bobsleigh event at the 2018 Winter Olympics in Pyeongchang. Moore was the team's brakewoman, and McNeill piloted the bobsleigh; their result of 8th was the best ever by a British women's Olympic bobsleigh team. Moore chose to miss the 2018–19 bobsleigh season to focus on her degree, before eventually deciding to give up bobsleigh and return to athletics.

In July 2021, Moore returned to bobsleigh. She aimed to qualify for the 2022 Winter Olympics alongside McNeill, with other contenders for the Games being shot putter Adele Nicoll and former sprinter Montell Douglas. Later in the year, she withdrew from the British team, after claiming that it was a negative environment and alleging discrimination based on her gender and skin colour. Moore returned to the team as a pilot for the 2022–23 season, but left the British bobsleigh programme later in 2022.

In January 2025, Moore began competing in bobsleigh for Jamaica, having achieved Jamaican citizenship in December 2024. She was selected for the 2026 Winter Olympics, and was also a Jamaican flag bearer at the opening ceremony. Moore finished 14th in the monobob.

== Personal life ==
Moore is from Newport, South Wales. She is of Jamaican heritage, and her grandfather moved from Jamaica to the United Kingdom as part of the Windrush generation. She attended Bassaleg School, and as of 2020, she was studying for a master's degree in Sport Broadcasting and Media at Cardiff Metropolitan University.

She won an episode of the BBC game show Winter Wipeout in 2012.
