= Anastasia Kocherzhova =

Russian bobsledder (born 1990)

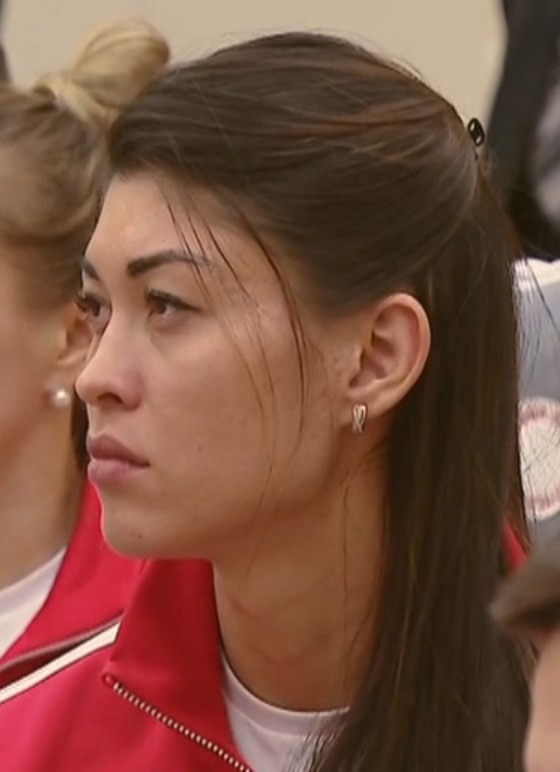
- Kocherzhova in 2018

Personal information
- Full name: Anastasia Borisovna Kocherzhova
- Nationality: Russian
- Born: 16 October 1990 (age 35)

Sport
- Sport: Bobsleigh
Medal record
European Championships
Silver medal – second place	2017 Winterberg	Two-woman

Anastasia Borisovna Kocherzhova (Russian: Анастасия Борисовна Кочержова; born 16 October 1990) is a Russian bobsledder and former track and field sprinter. She competed in the two-woman event at the 2018 Winter Olympics. She was a silver medallist in the two-man event at the European Bobsleigh Championships in 2017.

In athletics, she won the Russian under-23 title in the 200 metres in 2012. The following year she represented Russia internationally at the 2013 Summer Universiade, placing seventh in the 200 m and fourth with the 4 × 100 metres relay quartet. She won her first national title at the Russian Athletics Championships in 2016, topping the 200 m podium.
