= Kristen Bujnowski =

Canadian bobsledder (born 1992)

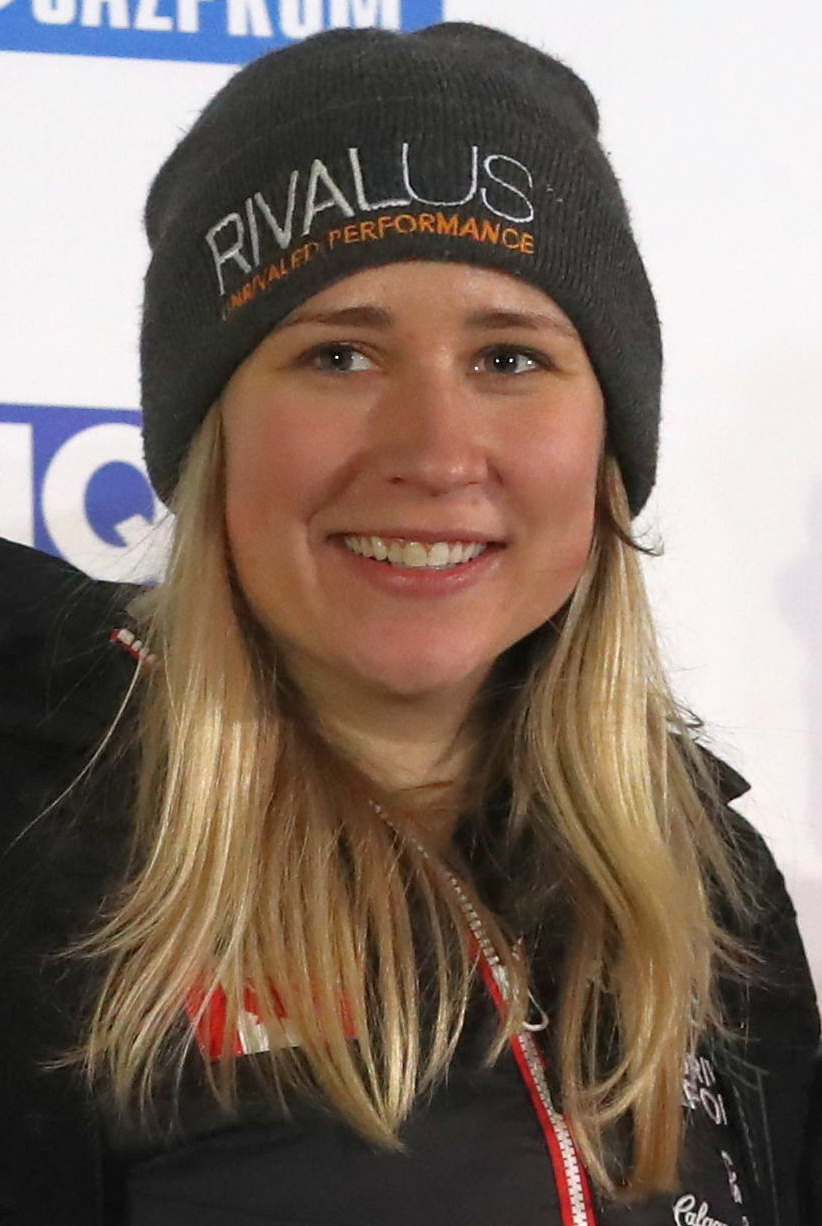
- Bujnowski in 2020

Personal information
- Born: March 14, 1992 (age 34) London, Ontario, Canada
- Height: 1.78 m (5 ft 10 in)
- Weight: 77 kg (170 lb)

Sport
- Country: Canada
- Sport: Bobsleigh
- Event: Two-woman
- Turned pro: 2017
Medal record
World Championships
Silver medal – second place	2019 Whistler	Mixed team
Bronze medal – third place	2019 Whistler	Two-woman
Bronze medal – third place	2020 Alternberg	Two-woman

Kristen Bujnowski (born March 14, 1992) is a Canadian bobsledder.

She was an alternate at the 2018 Winter Olympics in Two Women Bobsleigh.

Kristen was a brakeman at the IBSF World Championships 2019 with Christine de Bruin, winning a bronze medal.

She was a brakeman at the IBSF World Championships 2020 with Christine de Bruin, winning a bronze medal.

Kristen Bujnowski and Christine de Bruin also won a Bronze IBSF World Cup Crystal Globe in 2020.

In September 2021, she broke the Canadian and Calgary Ice House women's push record, pushing 5.36s. The Canadian record had been previously shared with Shelly-Ann Brown (2009), Cynthia Appiah (2019) and Kristen Bujnowski (2020) at 5.41s. The Calgary Ice House record was previously held by Aja Evans (2017) at 5.39s.

In January 2022, Bujnowski was named to Canada's 2022 Olympic team, finishing 5th in the two-woman event.
