= Anja Schneiderheinze-Stöckel =

German bobsledder

Anja Schneiderheinze
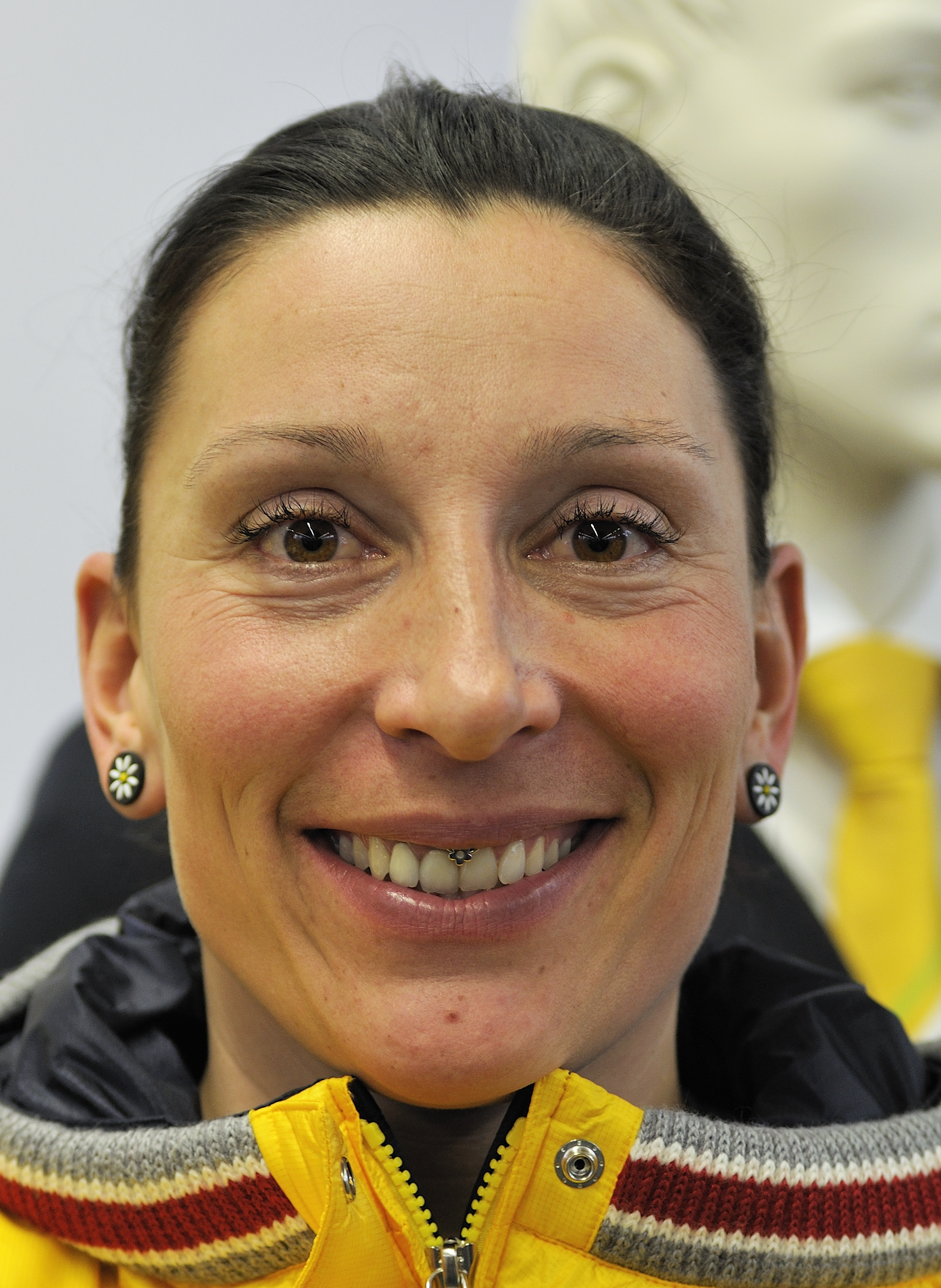
- Schneiderheinze in 2014

Personal information
- Born: 8 April 1978 (age 48) Erfurt, East Germany

Sport
- Country: Germany
- Sport: Bobsleigh
Medal record
Olympic Games
Gold medal – first place	2006 Turin	Two-woman
World Championships
Gold medal – first place	2005 Calgary	Two-woman
Gold medal – first place	2016 Igls	Two-woman
Gold medal – first place	2016 Igls	Mixed team
Silver medal – second place	2004 Königssee	Two-woman
Silver medal – second place	2015 Winterberg	Two-woman
Silver medal – second place	2015 Winterberg	Mixed team
European Championships
Gold medal – first place	2006 St. Moritz	Two-woman
Gold medal – first place	2015 La Plagne	Two-woman
Gold medal – first place	2016 St. Moritz	Two-woman
Silver medal – second place	2005 Altenberg	Two-woman
Silver medal – second place	2011 Winterberg	Two-woman
Silver medal – second place	2013 Innsbruck-Igls	Two-woman

Anja Schneiderheinze-Stöckel (German pronunciation: [ˈanja ˈʃnaɪdɐˌhaɪntsə ˈʃtœkl̩]; born 8 April 1978) is a German bobsledder who has competed since 2001. At the 2006 Winter Olympics in Turin, she won gold in the two-woman event with teammate Sandra Kiriasis.

The pair also won two medals at the FIBT World Championships with a gold in 2005 and a silver in 2004.
