= Huai Mingming =

Chinese bobsledder (born 1995)

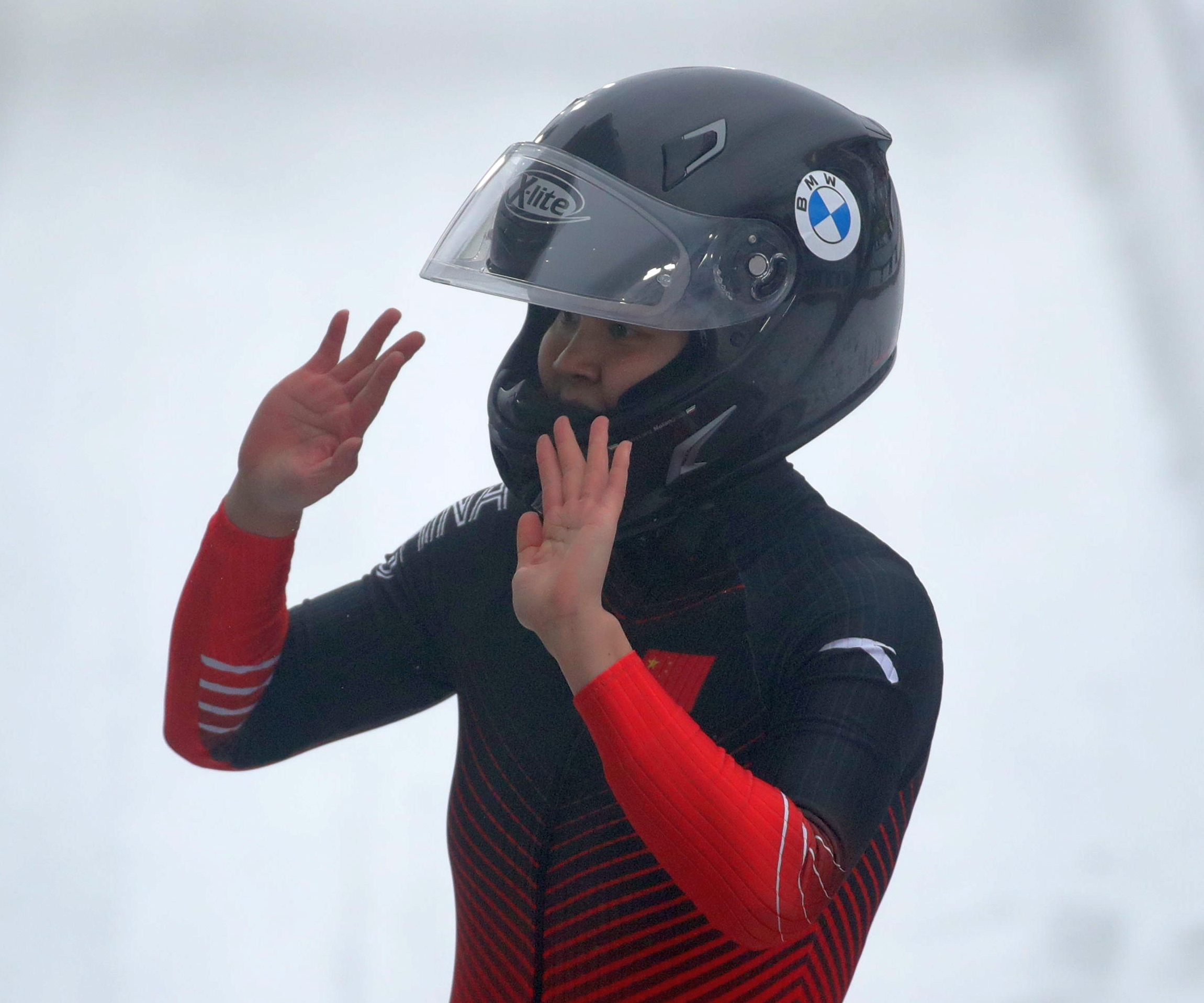
- Huai at a World Cup event at Altenberg in 2023

Personal information
- Nationality: Chinese
- Born: 10 March 1995 (age 31) Harbin, Heilongjiang, China
- Height: 175 cm (5 ft 9 in)
- Weight: 65 kg (143 lb)

Sport
- Country: China
- Sport: Bobsleigh
- Events: Monobob, Two-woman

Huai Mingming (Chinese: 怀明明; born 10 March 1995) is a Chinese bobsledder. She represented China at the 2022 and 2026 Winter Olympics.

== Career ==
Huai began competing in Bobsleigh during the 2016–17 season. In 2019, she made her first appearance in the Bobsleigh World Championships at Whistler.

Huai was selected to represent China at the 2022 Winter Olympics. She finished 6th in the monobob, the better placed of the two Chinese competitors in the event. She finished 11th in two-woman, with brakewoman Wang Xuan. At the 2026 Winter Olympics, she was selected again to represent China in bobsleigh. She finished 16th in monobob, and finished 11th again in two-woman.

== Bobsleigh results ==
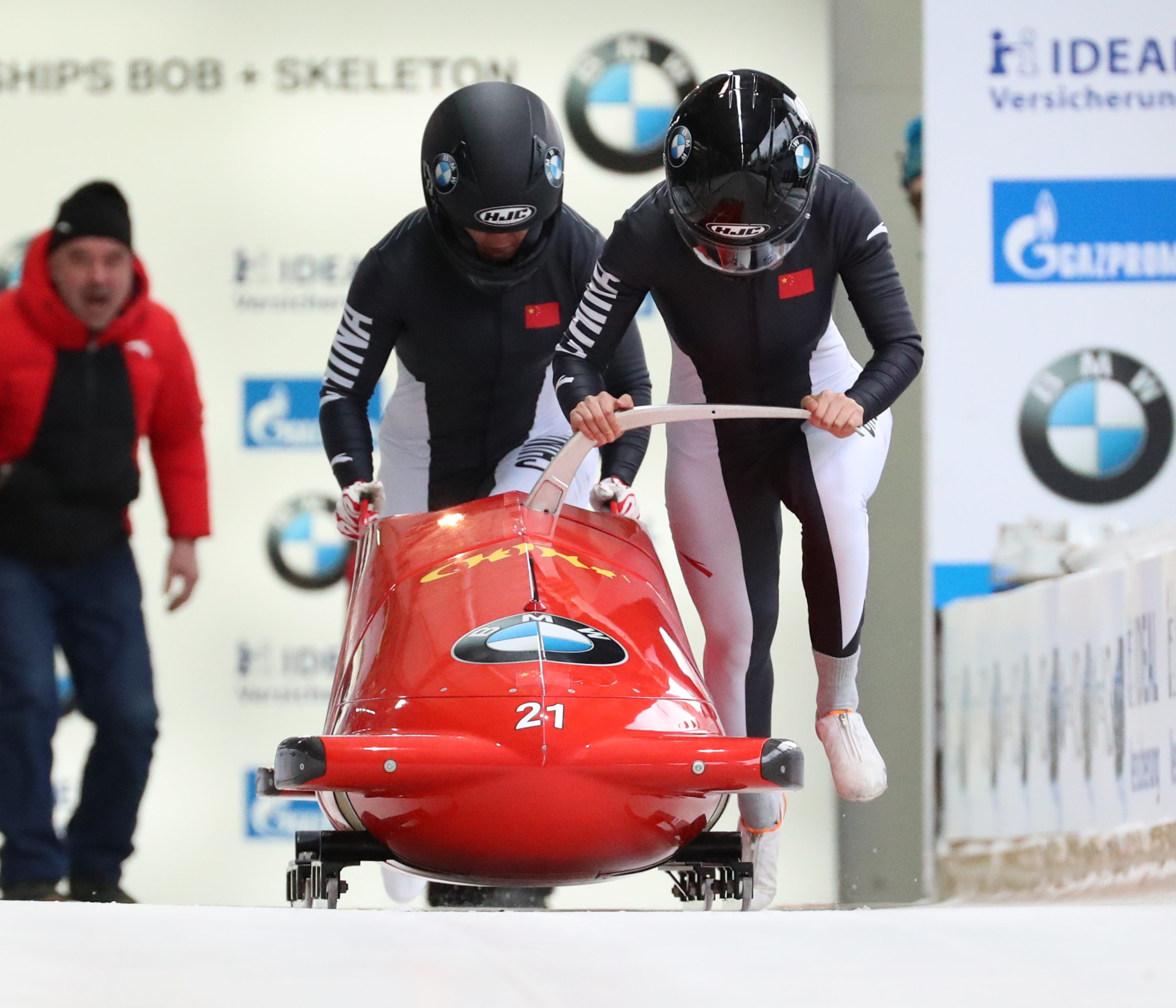
Huai competing at the 2020 IBSF World Championships.

All results are sourced from the International Bobsleigh and Skeleton Federation (IBSF).

=== Olympic Games ===
Event	Monobob	Two-woman
(China) 2022 Beijing	6th	11th
(Italy) 2026 Milano Cortina	16th	11th

=== World Championships ===
Event	Monobob	Two-woman
(Canada) 2019 Whistler	—	10th
(Germany) 2020 Altenberg	—	12th
(Switzerland) 2023 St. Moritz	11th	10th
