= Mica McNeill =

British bobsledder (born 1993)

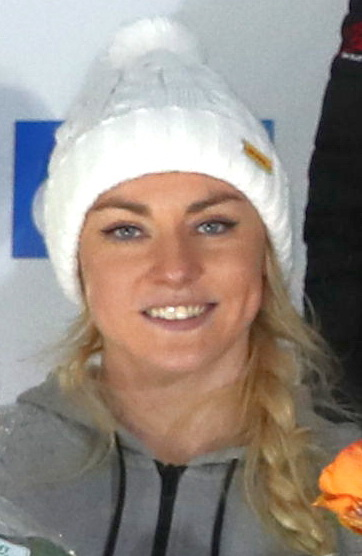
- Mica McNeill in Altenberg in 2019

Personal information
- Citizenship: British
- Born: 25 September 1993 (age 33) Consett, County Durham, England
- Years active: 2010–2023

Sport
- Sport: Bobsleigh
- Retired: 2023

Achievements and titles
- Olympic finals: 2018, 2022
Medal record
Representing Great Britain
Winter Youth Olympics
Silver medal – second place	2012 Innsbruck	2-woman
Junior Bobsleigh World Championships
Gold medal – first place	2017 Winterberg	2-woman
Bobsleigh World Cup
Silver medal – second place	2022 Sigulda	2-woman

Mica McNeill (born 25 September 1993) is a British former bobsledder. She won a silver medal at the 2012 Winter Youth Olympics in Innsbruck, Austria, and at the 2021–22 Bobsleigh World Cup event in Sigulda, Latvia. She competed at the 2018 and 2022 Winter Olympics.

== Early life ==
McNeill is from Consett, County Durham, England, and attended Durham High School for Girls.

== Career ==
She joined the British Bobsleigh programme in 2010, and competed at the 2012 Winter Youth Olympics in Innsbruck, Austria. Competing alongside Jazmin Sawyers, she won a silver medal in the 2-girls bobsleigh event. She has competed in the 2-women bobsleigh event at the Bobsleigh World Championships. In 2013, McNeill and Nikki McSweeney came 20th, in 2015, McNeill and Aleasha Kiddle came 14th, and in 2016, McNeill and Natalie Deratt came 12th.

In January 2017, McNeill and Mica Moore won the 2-women event at the 2017 IBSF Junior Bobsleigh World Championships in Winterberg, Germany. Later in the year, the British Bobsleigh and Skeleton Association withdrew funding for McNeill and Moore, after deciding to maintain funding only for the British male bobsleigh teams. The pair then managed to crowdfund £30,000, allowing them to compete in the 2017–18 Bobsleigh World Cup events. The money was needed to pay for travel between races for the pair of them, transport of the sled, race fees, insurance and possible medical expenses, among other things, and allowed them to concentrate on trying to win races. By January 2018, McNeill and Moore had raised over £41,000 to fund their competitions. The pair had the slogan "Powered By The People" written on their sled. McNeill and Moore finished fifth in the 2-women bobsleigh event in Whistler, Canada, which was the best result for a British women's team in the Bobsleigh World Cup for 8 years. In January 2018, McNeill was selected as the pilot for the British 2-women bobsleigh team at the 2018 Winter Olympics in Pyeongchang. Moore was selected as the brakewoman for the team. Their result of 8th was the best ever by a British women's Olympic bobsleigh team.

In 2019, McNeill and Montell Douglas finished sixth in the 2-women bobsleigh event in Königssee. In 2020, McNeill and Douglas came eighth in the two-woman event at the IBSF World Championships. During the COVID-19 pandemic, McNeill's father and brother built a push-start track for her in their garden. McNeill and Douglas came fourth in the 2020–21 Bobsleigh World Cup 2-women event in Innsbruck, her best ever finish at a Bobsleigh World Cup event. The pair finished the season ninth overall. At the IBSF World Championships 2021, she came 13th in the monobob event and 19th in the two-woman event alongside Douglas.

At the 2021–22 Bobsleigh World Cup, McNeill competed in events alongside Moore, Douglas and shot putter Adele Nicoll, all of whom were attempting to earn a place with McNeill for the 2-woman event at the 2022 Winter Olympics. In January 2022, McNeill and Nicoll finished second in the World Cup event in Sigulda, Latvia. It was the first time a British woman had won a Bobsleigh World Cup medal in 13 years. That month, McNeill and Douglas were confirmed as Britain's selections for the 2022 Winter Olympics. The pair finished 17th in the two-woman event. After the Games, McNeill announced that she was taking a break from the sport; in 2023, McNeill announced her retirement.
