= Sophie Vercruyssen =

Belgian bobsledder

Personal information
- Born: 22 February 1992 (age 34)

Sport
- Country: Belgium
- Sport: Bobsleigh
Medal record
European Championships
Silver medal – second place	2016 St. Moritz	Two-woman

Sophie Vercruyssen (born 22 February 1992) is a Belgian bobsledder. She competed in the two-woman event at the 2018 Winter Olympics. She lives with her partner Lore Simons in Belgium.
