= Yanqing National Sliding Centre =

Bobsleigh, luge, and skeleton track located in Yanqing, Beijing, China

Yanqing National Sliding Center
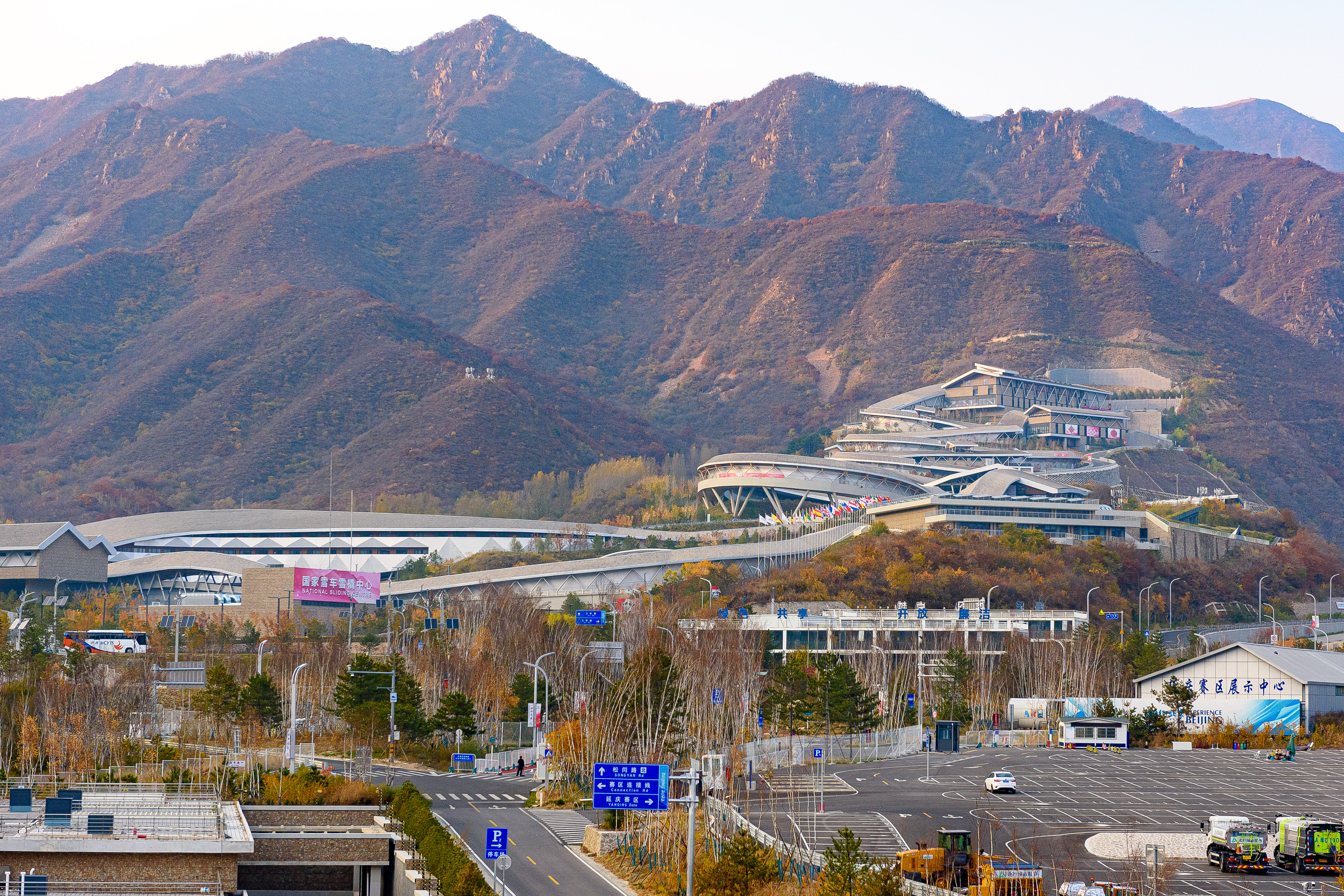
- Interactive map of Yanqing National Sliding Center
- Location: Yanqing District, Beijing, China
- Coordinates: 40°31′14.7″N 115°46′51.9″E
- Capacity: 10,000 (1,500 seated)
- Field size: Total length: 1975m (Competition Length 1615m)

Construction
- Groundbreaking: July 2018
- Built: July 2018 to November 2020
- Opened: November 2020
- Main contractor: Shanghai Baoye Group Co. Ltd

The Yanqing National Sliding Centre is a bobsleigh, luge, and skeleton track in Yanqing District, a suburban district in Beijing. Also known as "The House of Speed" this venue hosted the bobsleigh, luge, and skeleton events for the 2022 Winter Olympics. The track has 16 curves with different angles and slopes.

== Events hosted ==
- Bobsleigh at the 2022 Winter Olympics
- Luge at the 2022 Winter Olympics
- Skeleton at the 2022 Winter Olympics

== See also ==
- China national bobsleigh team
