= Elana Meyers Taylor =

American bobsledder (born 1984)

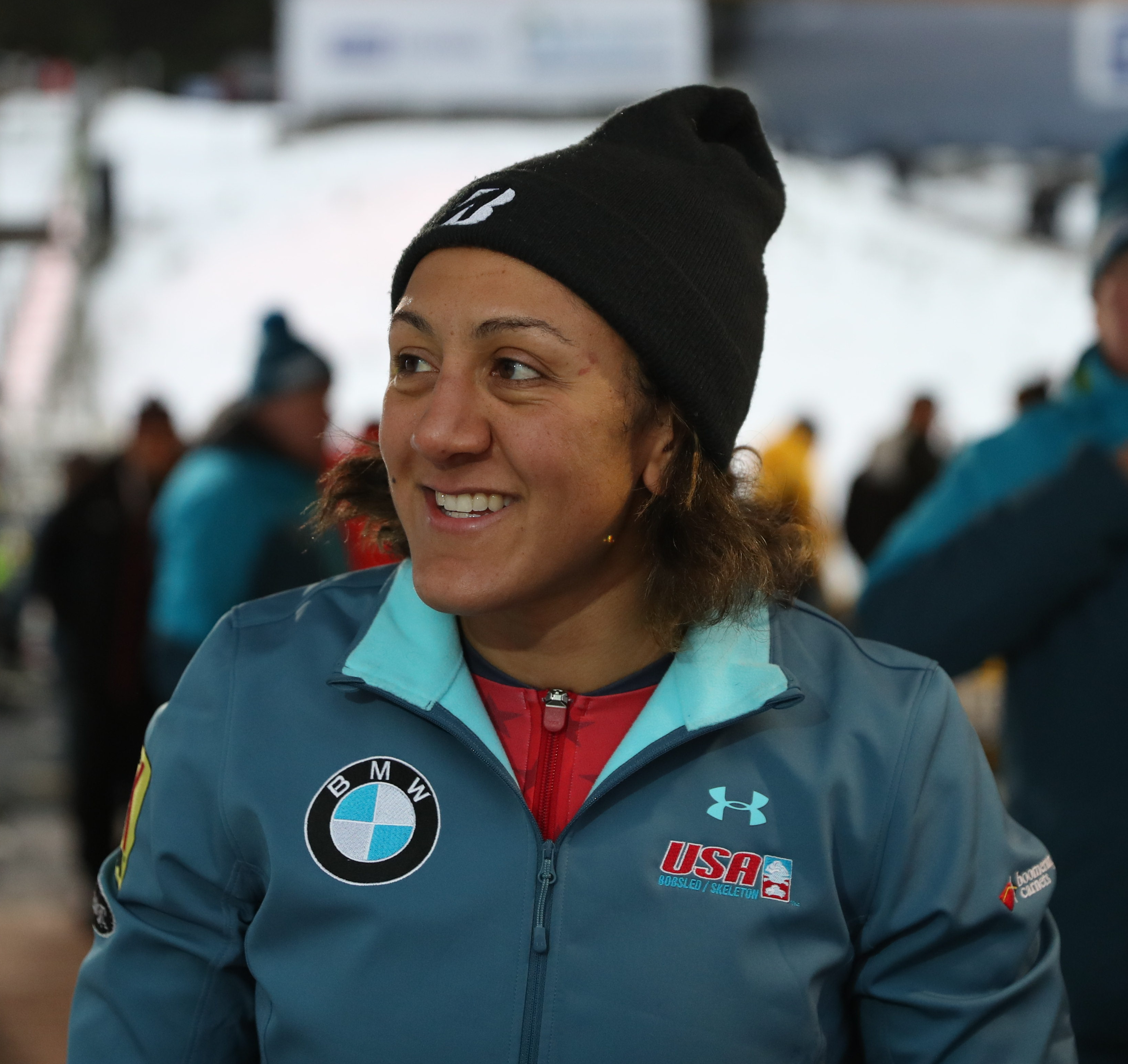
- Elana Meyers Taylor in 2019

Personal information
- Born: Elana Alessandra Meyers; October 10, 1984 (age 42) Oceanside, California, U.S.
- Home town: Douglasville, Georgia, U.S.
- Education: George Washington University
- Height: 1.70 m (5 ft 7 in)
- Weight: 79 kg (174 lb)

Sport
- Country: United States
- Sport: Bobsleigh
Medal record
Women's bobsleigh
Representing the United States
Olympic Games
Gold medal – first place	2026 Milano Cortina	Monobob
Silver medal – second place	2014 Sochi	Two-woman
Silver medal – second place	2018 Pyeongchang	Two-woman
Silver medal – second place	2022 Beijing	Monobob
Bronze medal – third place	2010 Vancouver	Two-woman
Bronze medal – third place	2022 Beijing	Two-woman
World Championships
Gold medal – first place	2012 Lake Placid	Mixed team
Gold medal – first place	2013 St. Moritz	Mixed team
Gold medal – first place	2015 Winterberg	Two-woman
Gold medal – first place	2017 Königssee	Two-woman
Silver medal – second place	2009 Lake Placid	Two-woman
Silver medal – second place	2013 St. Moritz	Two-woman
Silver medal – second place	2024 Winterberg	Monobob
Bronze medal – third place	2012 Lake Placid	Two-woman
Bronze medal – third place	2016 Igls	Two-woman
Bronze medal – third place	2025 Lake Placid	Monobob
Pan American Championships
Gold medal – first place	2024 Lake Placid	Two-woman bob
Gold medal – first place	2024 Lake Placid	Mono-bob

Elana Meyers Taylor (born Elana Alessandra Meyers; October 10, 1984) is an American Olympic bobsledder who has competed since 2007. Born in Oceanside, California, Meyers Taylor was raised in Douglasville, Georgia and is a graduate of George Washington University, where she was a member of the softball team. After three silver and two bronze medals at the previous four Olympic Games, Meyers Taylor won her first gold at the 2026 Winter Olympics at age 41. She is also a four-time World Champion, winning two gold medals each in the two-woman and mixed team events.

== Career ==
Meyers Taylor won the silver in the bobsled two-woman event with Shauna Rohbock at the 2009 FIBT World Championships in Lake Placid, New York.

She was named to the U.S. team for the 2010 Winter Olympics on January 16, 2010.

On February 24, 2010, Meyers Taylor and Erin Pac won the bronze medal at the 2010 Winter Olympic Games. Their first run has a time of 53.28. Their second run has a time of 53.05. Their third run has a time of 53.29. Their fourth run has a time of 53.78 for a total of 3:33.40, a difference of +1.12 from first place.

In 2010, Meyers Taylor received a grant from the Women's Sports Foundation (WSF) Travel and Training Fund, and another in 2013. She went on to serve on the WSF advisory board and eventually served as their president in 2019.

Meyers Taylor and brakewoman Katie Eberling placed second at the 2013 FIBT World Championships in St. Moritz.

On February 19, 2014, Meyers Taylor and Lauryn Williams won the silver medal at the 2014 Winter Olympic Games. Their first run has a time of 57.26, a track record. Their second run has a time of 57.63. Their third run has a time of 57.69. Their fourth run has a time of 58.13 for a total of 3:50.71, a difference of +0.10 from first place, just edged out by rival Canada 1, piloted by Kaillie Humphries and braked by Heather Moyse.

In April 2014, she took part in the 2014 China Women's Rugby Sevens tournament with the United States women's national team.

In September 2014, the Fédération Internationale de Bobsleigh et de Tobogganing announced it would allow mixed-gender crews to compete in four-man bobsleigh. On 8 November, Meyers Taylor led a four-man crew to third place in the US trials, securing a place to compete for the US national team, despite only having four days training in a four-man sled. On November 15, 2014, Meyers and Kaillie Humphries of Canada became the first women to compete with/against men in an international four-man bobsleigh competition, in the season-opening North American Cup race in Park City, Utah. Meyers Taylor piloted her mixed team's sled to a seventh-place finish, Humphries piloted hers to sixth.

In February 2015, Meyers Taylor and pusher Cherrelle Garrett beat three German crews to win the first world championship title in women's bobsled for the United States. This also made Meyers Taylor the first U.S. bobsled driver, either male or female, in 56 years to win a worlds title on a non-North American track.

In February 2018, Meyers Taylor and pusher Lauren Gibbs won a silver medal in the two-woman bobsleigh event at the 2018 Winter Olympics.

Meyers Taylor was chosen as a flag bearer for the 2022 U.S. Olympic team but was unable to attend the opening ceremony due to testing positive for COVID-19 and was replaced by Brittany Bowe who served on her behalf.

At the 2026 Winter Olympics, Meyers Taylor won a gold medal in the women's monobob event with a four-run total time of 3:57.93, finishing 0.04 ahead of Germany's Laura Nolte (silver, 3:57.97) and U.S. teammate Kaillie Armbruster Humphries (bronze, 3:58.05). At age 41, she became the oldest-ever gold medal winner in any Winter Olympics individual event.

On August 30, 2026, Meyers Taylor was inducted into the Washington DC Sports Hall of Fame.

== Personal life ==
Meyers Taylor was born in Oceanside, California, and grew up with her family in Douglasville, Georgia. Her father was a professional football player. After failing to make the US Olympic softball team, she tried bobsledding at her parents' suggestion.

Meyers Taylor attended The George Washington University on a scholarship for softball. The university later presented Taylor with an honorary doctorate in 2018 and the President's Medal in 2022. Meyers Taylor was the commencement speaker for the university's Class of 2022.

Meyers Taylor married coach and fellow Olympic bobsledder Nic Taylor in April 2014. She gave birth to her son, Nico, in 2020, at the beginning of the COVID-19 pandemic. Nico was born with Down syndrome. Her second son, Noah, was born in 2022. Both children are deaf due to a mutation unrelated to Down syndrome.

Meyers Taylor is a Christian. She has said, "One of the big reasons I was put in bobsled is to help people not only reach their goals but come to Christ. God put me here for a specific reason, and I don't think it's just to win medals. At the end of the day, I'm in this sport to glorify God, so if that means I come in last place, or I win the gold medal, that's what I'm going to do."

Meyers Taylor was inducted as an honorary member of Sigma Gamma Rho on July 24, 2026, at their 61st Biennial Boule in Tampa, Florida.

== Activism and overcoming adversity ==
In January 2014, Meyers Taylor suffered a concussion while racing in Konigssee, Germany. Just four days after the initial incident, Taylor was cleared to compete again and, within a month, had won a world championship title. However, Meyers Taylor's symptoms returned during a 2-month-long internship with the International Olympic Committee in Switzerland. In November 2014, she took another hit to her head and was not fully cleared to compete and practice again until mid-December of that year. In 2018, Meyers Taylor announced she would be donating her brain to concussion research as a way to help and empower future female athletes. Meyers has also suffered and come back from a torn Achilles tendon.

In November 2014, Meyers Taylor made history by becoming the first woman to win a medal in a men's event as part of an international competition. Not only was she one of the first women to compete in a mixed-gender four-man race, she did so with her husband Nic Taylor as her brakeman.

In a 2018 US Olympic Committee press release, Meyers Taylor spoke out about her drive to advocate for female athletes and women, writing that as a woman of Team USA, she "has a responsibility to fight for equality for those who can't. She loves the responsibility." In January 2019, Elana Meyers Taylor began her term as president of the Women's Sports Foundation due to her passion and advocacy work for female athletes.

On June 26, 2020, Meyers Taylor called attention to the racism she has faced throughout her athletic career—specifically in her bobsledding career—in an article by Team USA. She detailed an incident in which an Olympic coach of another country's team made multiple racist statements, both general and specific to Meyers Taylor. Meyers Taylor's article also alleged that one of the fastest sled manufacturers in the world refuses to sell to black bobsledders. Her article resulted in the creation of a task force by the International Bobsled and Skeleton Federation to investigate these incidents. Additionally, Meyers Taylor announced she was creating a workshop for others to share and spread their experiences facing racism to expose the biases that often lead to racist incidents and to teach alternative behaviors that do not cause discrimination.
