= Yulia Belomestnykh =

Russian bobsledder (born 1996)

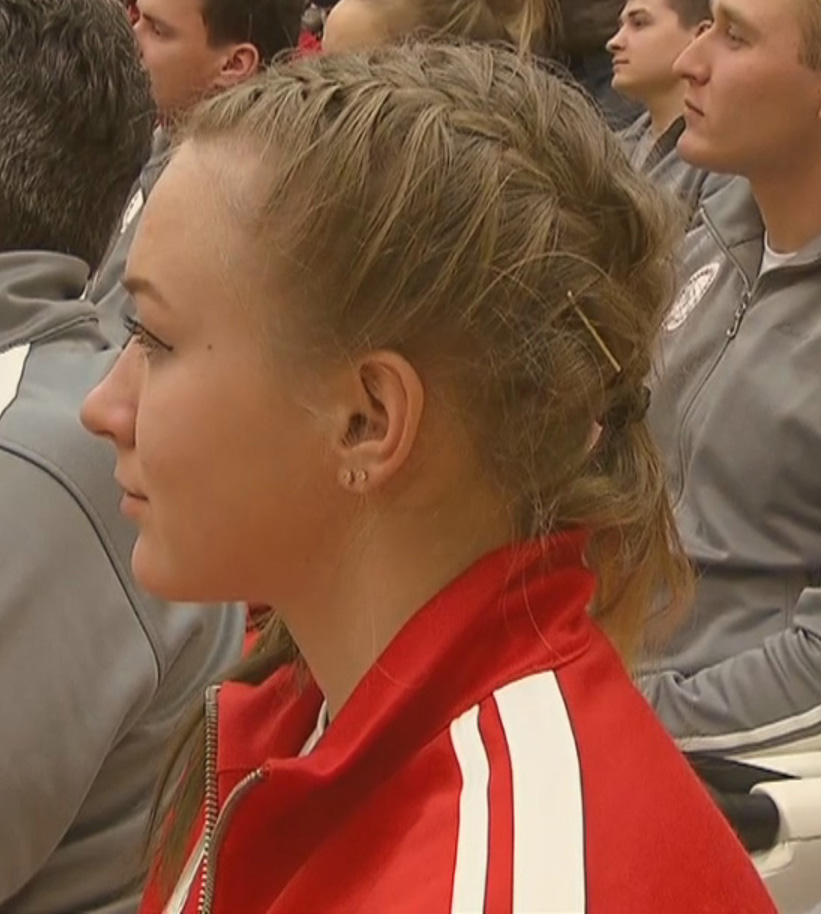
- Yulia Belomestnykh in 2018

Personal information
- Full name: Yulia Vladimirovna Belomestnykh
- Nationality: Russian
- Born: 17 March 1996 (age 30) Novotroitsk, Russia

Sport
- Sport: Bobsleigh

Yulia Vladimirovna Belomestnykh (Russian: Юлия Владимировна Беломестных; born 17 March 1996) is a Russian bobsledder. She competed in the two-woman event at the 2018 Winter Olympics.
