= Erline Nolte =

German bobsledder

Personal information
- Born: 19 May 1989 (age 37) Dortmund

Sport
- Country: Germany
- Sport: Bobsleigh
Medal record
European Championships
Bronze medal – third place	2015 La Plagne	Two-woman

Erline Nolte (born 19 May 1989) is a German former bobsledder. She competed in the two-woman event at the 2018 Winter Olympics. Her personal coach is Heiner Preute.
