= Lauren Gibbs =

American bobsledder (born 1984)

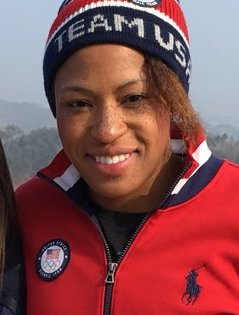
- Gibbs at the 2018 Winter Olympics

Personal information
- Nationality: American
- Born: March 2, 1984 (age 42) Los Angeles, California
- Height: 5 ft 10 in (178 cm)
- Weight: 170 lb (77 kg)

Sport
- Country: United States
- Sport: Bobsleigh
- Event: Two-women
Medal record
Olympic Games
Silver medal – second place	2018 Pyeongchang	Two-woman
World Championships
Gold medal – first place	2020 Altenberg	Two-woman
Bronze medal – third place	2016 Igls	Two-woman

Lauren Gibbs (born March 2, 1984) is an American bobsledder who competes as a brakeman. She was named to the U.S. Olympic team for the 2018 Winter Olympics.

== Career ==
Gibbs played volleyball while she was a student at Brown University. She left a job as a sales manager in 2013 to try out for the U.S. bobsled team. Gibbs won a bronze medal at the 2016 bobsled world championships, and with Elana Meyers Taylor won a silver medal in the two-woman event at the 2018 Winter Olympics.
