= Annika Drazek =

German bobsledder and sprinter

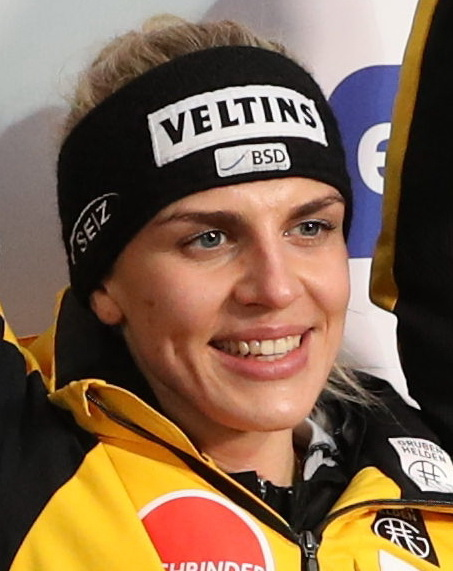
- Annika Drazek in Altenberg in 2019

Personal information
- Nationality: German
- Born: 11 April 1995 (age 31) Gladbeck, Germany
- Height: 1.76 m (5 ft 9 in)
- Weight: 77 kg (170 lb)

Sport
- Country: Germany
- Sport: Bobsleigh
- Event: Two-woman
- Club: BSC Winterberg
- Turned pro: 2014
Medal record
World Championships
Gold medal – first place	2016 Igls	Two-woman
Gold medal – first place	2019 Whistler	Two-woman
Silver medal – second place	2015 Winterberg	Two-woman
European Championships
Gold medal – first place	2016 St. Moritz	Two-woman
Gold medal – first place	2017 Winterberg	Two-woman
Gold medal – first place	2018 Innsbruck-Igls	Two-woman
Gold medal – first place	2019 Königssee	Two-woman
- Updated on 3 March 2019

Annika Drazek (born 11 April 1995) is a German bobsledder and former track and field athlete.

She was a sprinter, competed at two IAAF World Youth Championships. In bobsleigh, she competes with Anja Schneiderheinze-Stöckel, with whom she won the gold medal at World Championships 2016 two-woman event.
