= Montell Douglas =

British sportswoman (born 1986)

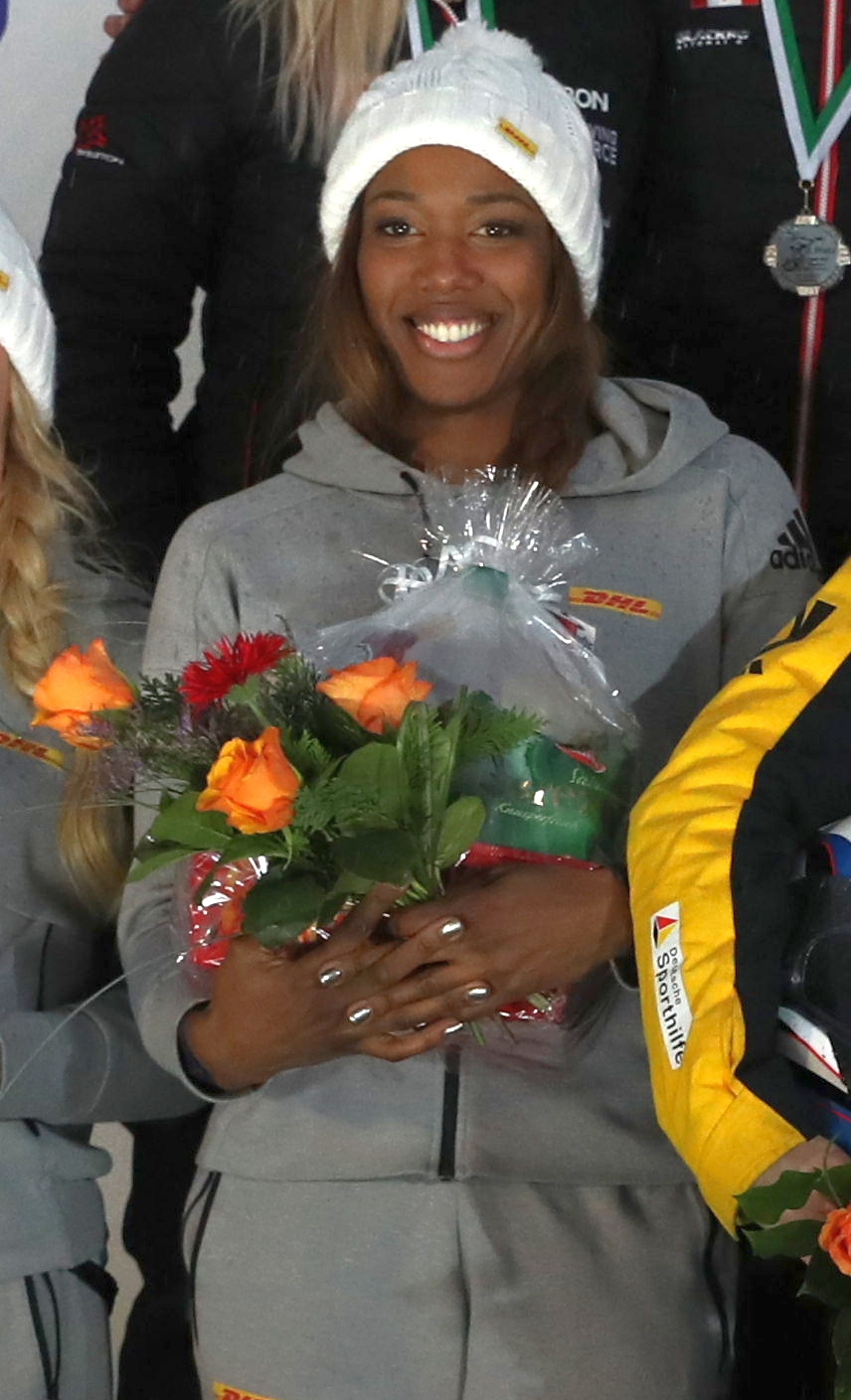
- Montell Douglas in 2019 at the Bobsleigh World Cup

Personal information
- Nicknames: "Monty Trackstar" "Monty" "Fire"
- Born: Montell Marcelle Douglas; 24 January 1986 (age 40) Lewisham, London, England
- Education: Brunel University
- Occupations: Multi-sport Olympian; Television personality
- Height: 177 cm (5 ft 10 in)
- Weight: 78 kg (172 lb)

Sport
- Country: (United Kingdom) Great Britain
- Sport: Athletics, Bobsleigh
- Club: Blackheath & Bromley Harriers AC
- Turned pro: 2007 (athletics); 2016 (bobsleigh)

Achievements and titles
- Olympic finals: 2008 Summer, 2022 Winter
- Personal bests: 60 m 7.25; 100 m 11.05; 200 m 23.38

Montell Marcelle "Monty" Douglas (born 24 January 1986) is a British multi-sports Olympian. Originally a sprinter and former British record holder for the 100 metres at 11.05 seconds, she competed at the 2008 Summer Olympics. Taking up bobsleigh in 2016 and becoming part of the Great Britain two-woman bobsleigh team the following year, she competed at the 2022 Winter Olympics. She is one of the two female athletes, the other being Jaqueline Mourão, who participated in both of the Olympic Games hosted by Beijing.

Outside of competing, she went on to appear as "Fire" in the 2024 BBC One reboot of Gladiators, and was subsequently a contestant on the twenty-second series of Strictly Come Dancing. In 2026, she joined BBC Sport as an analyst for winter sports and athletics, ahead of the Winter Olympics.

== Early life ==
Montell Marcelle Douglas was born on 24 January 1986, in Lewisham, London. She was raised by Jamaican parents. At a very young age, Douglas developed an interest in athletics and was encouraged by her PE teacher to participate in it.

She attended Ravensbourne School and went on to study sports science at Brunel University.

== Athletics career ==
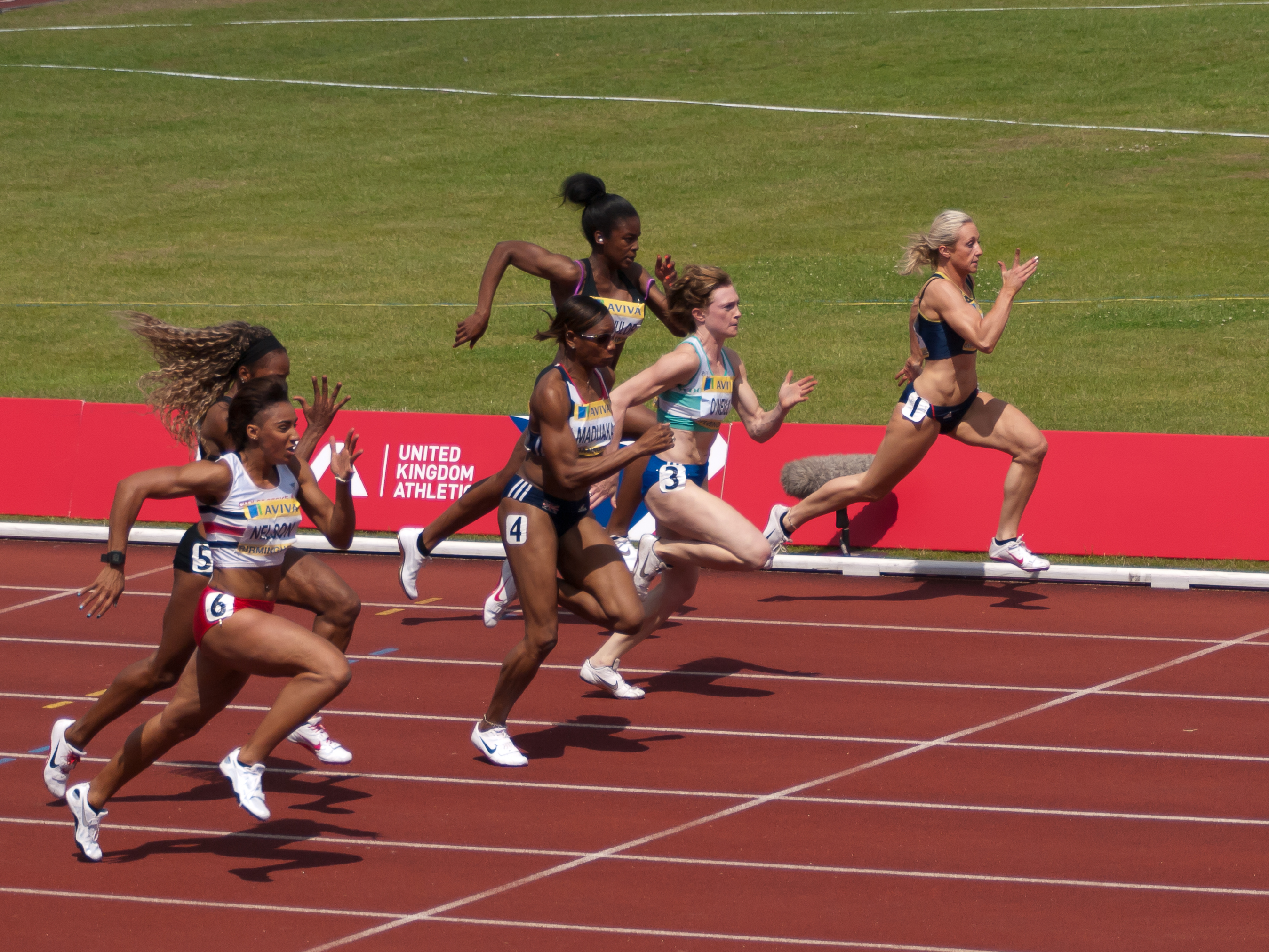
Montell Douglas (no.5) during her career as a sprinter in 2010

Douglas made her first senior major championship appearance at the 2007 European Athletics Indoor Championships. Although she was knocked out in the semi-finals, she set a new 60 metres personal best of 7.28 seconds.

She was part of the British 4 × 100 metres relay team that finished fourth at the 2007 World Championships in Athletics in Osaka (along with Laura Turner, Joice Maduaka and Emily Freeman). At the same championships, she competed in the 100 m individual event but was eliminated in the quarter-finals stage.

In the 2008 season, she finished second behind Jeanette Kwakye in the women's 100 m at the British Championships. At the Loughborough European Athletics meeting on 17 July, during the semi-final, she ran a wind-assisted (+2.6 m/s) time of 10.95 seconds. In the final, she broke Kathy Cook's British record with a time of 11.05 seconds. Douglas had improved her personal best by almost a quarter of a second and broken a national record which had stood unbeaten for over a quarter of a century in the process.

=== 2008 Summer Olympics ===
Douglas represented Great Britain at the 2008 Olympics, in the 100 metres. In her first round heat, she placed second behind Ivet Lalova in a time of 11.36 to advance to the second round. There she failed to qualify for the semi-finals as her time of 11.38 was only the fourth fastest time of her heat. She was also part of the Great Britain team which reached the final of the 4 × 100 metres relay, and which (along with the Jamaican team) were favourites to claim a medal. Jeanette Kwakye ran a good first bend in the final, but the British team failed to finish due to a mix-up in the changeover between Douglas and Emily Freeman. Jamaica also failed to finish after a similar error between Sherone Simpson and Kerron Stewart.

=== Personal bests ===
Event	Best	Location	Date
60 metres	7.25 s	Newham, England	13 February 2013
100 metres	11.05 s	Loughborough, England	17 July 2008
200 metres (outdoor)	23.34 s	La Chaux-de-Fonds, Switzerland	28 June 2009
200 metres (indoor)	23.93 s	Birmingham, England	20 February 2005

- All information taken from IAAF profile

== Bobsleigh career ==
In 2016, Douglas took up bobsleigh. She finished in the top 10 on her Bobsleigh World Cup debut in January 2017, and later in the season, she finished seventh at an event in St. Moritz. She was Great Britain's reserve athlete for the 2018 Winter Olympics in Pyeongchang. In 2019, Douglas and Mica McNeill finished sixth in the 2-women bobsleigh event in Königssee. In 2020, Douglas and McNeill came fourth in the 2020–21 Bobsleigh World Cup 2-women event in Innsbruck. In January 2022, Douglas and McNeill were selected for the 2-women event at the 2022 Winter Olympics. Douglas became the first female Briton to compete at the Summer and Winter Olympics, and notably, both were held in Beijing. The pair finished 17th in the two-woman event.

== Outside sport ==
Douglas appeared on the game show Who Dares Wins on 14 January 2011 and won £12,500.

In May 2023, Douglas was named as "Fire", one of the new Gladiators in a reboot of the television series of the same name broadcast on BBC One. At 5 ft 10 in, she is one of the tallest female Gladiators on the show, and is known for her speed and strength.

In August 2024, Douglas was announced as a contestant on the twenty-second series of Strictly Come Dancing. Alongside her dance teacher Johannes Radebe, she finished the competition in sixth place after the judges saved Tasha Ghouri and Aljaž Škorjanec.

For the BBC, Douglas was a pundit at the Milano Cortina 2026 Olympics, analysing the bobsleigh events.
