= Mariama Jamanka =

Retired German bobsledder

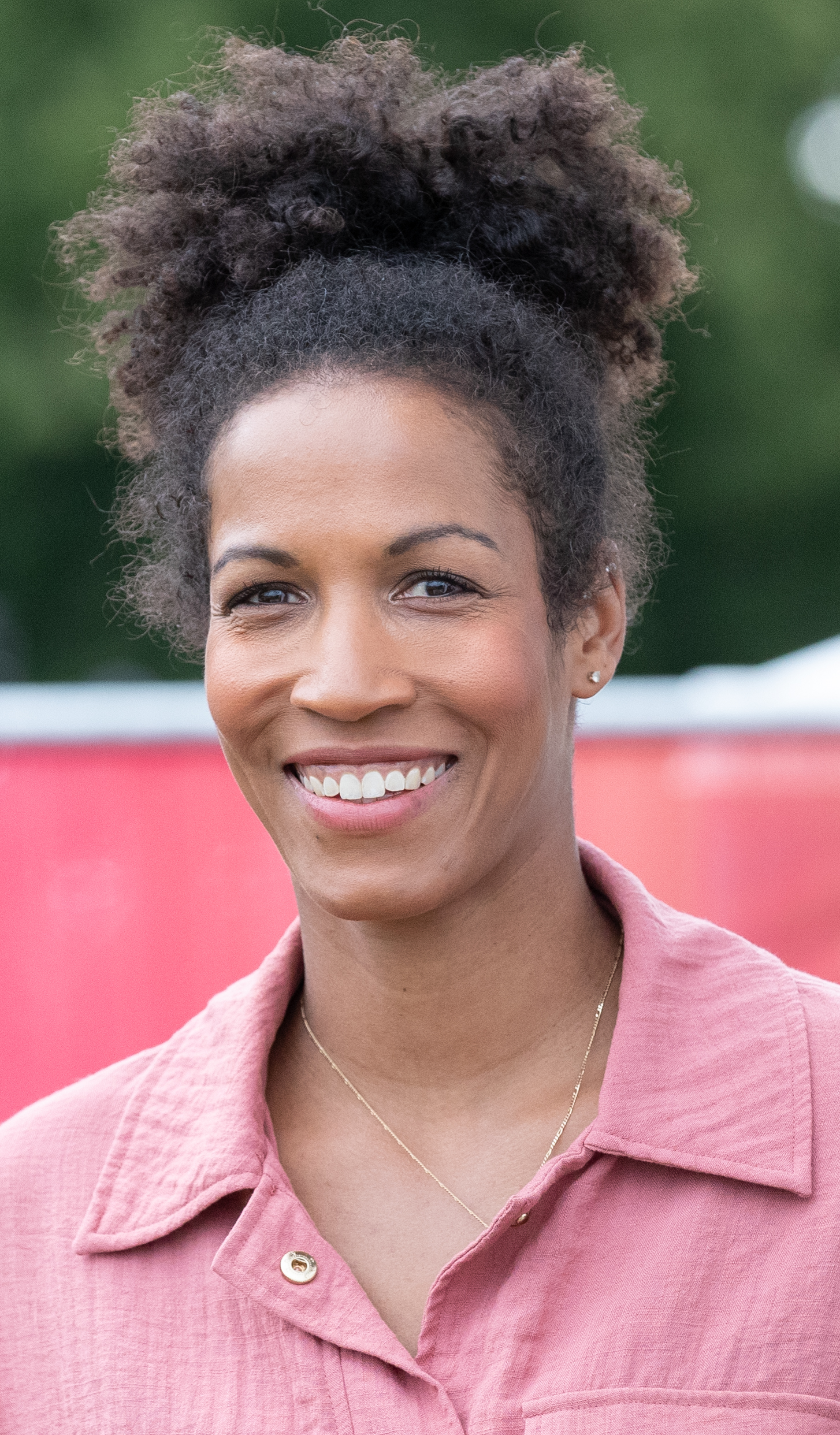
- Jamanka in 2025

Personal information
- Nationality: German
- Born: 23 August 1990 (age 35) West Berlin, Germany
- Height: 1.70 m (5 ft 7 in)
- Weight: 73 kg (161 lb)

Sport
- Country: Germany
- Sport: Bobsleigh
- Event: Two-woman
- Club: BRC Thüringen
- Turned pro: 2012
Medal record
Olympic Games
Gold medal – first place	2018 Pyeongchang	Two-woman
Silver medal – second place	2022 Beijing	Two-woman
World Championships
Gold medal – first place	2017 Königssee	Mixed team
Gold medal – first place	2019 Whistler	Two-woman
European Championships
Gold medal – first place	2017 Winterberg	Two-woman
Gold medal – first place	2019 Königssee	Two-woman
Gold medal – first place	2022 St. Moritz	Monobob
Silver medal – second place	2018 Innsbruck-Igls	Two-woman
Silver medal – second place	2022 St. Moritz	Two-woman
Bronze medal – third place	2021 Winterberg	Two-woman

Mariama Jamanka (born 23 August 1990) is a journalist and retired German bobsledder who won Gold in the two-woman event with Lisa Buckwitz at the 2018 Winter Olympics.

== Career ==
A former discus and hammer thrower of Berlin, Jamanka became a bobsledder in 2013. She entered the Bobsleigh World Cup during the 2015–16 season. In January 2017, she won the European Championship in Winterberg with brakewoman Annika Drazek. Later the same year, she was part of the gold-winning German team in the mixed team event at the IBSF World Championships in Königssee.

Before the 2018 Winter Olympics in Pyeongchang, Germany's head coach René Spies changed the brakewomen of the country's two leading two-women bobsleighs: Drazek was assigned to pilot Stephanie Schneider, while Jamanka had to work with Schneider's former brakewoman Lisa Buckwitz, with Schneider and Drazek being the most aspiring German team for the Pyeongchang Games. However, Jamanka and Buckwitz won the event, winning Germany's first two-woman bobsleigh medal since 2006, while Schneider and Drazek, who both became injured during the Games, finished fourth.

Jamanka announced her retirement from the sport in April 2022.

In January 2024, she started as a sports presenter on German national TV.

== Personal ==
Mariama's mother is German, and her father is from the Gambia.
