= Melissa Lotholz =

Canadian bobsledder (born 1992)

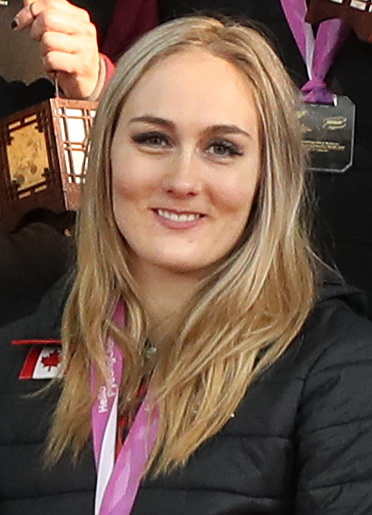
- Melissa Lotholz in 2017

Personal information
- Born: December 2, 1992 (age 33) Barrhead, Alberta, Canada
- Height: 1.71 m (5 ft 7 in)
- Weight: 75 kg (165 lb)
- Website: Mellotholz.com

Sport
- Country: Canada
- Sport: Bobsleigh
- Events: 2-woman, monobob
Medal record
World Championships
Silver medal – second place	2016 Igls	Two-woman
Silver medal – second place	2017 Königssee	Two-woman

Melissa Lotholz (born December 2, 1992) is a Canadian bobsledder.

== Career ==
Melissa Lotholz found her origins in sport as a sprinter and ran for the University of Alberta from 2011 to 2014. In 2014, she made the switch in her career to Bobsleigh. In her rookie season, Lotholz pushed Kaillie Humphries to 3 World Cup medals. The following season the duo won 9 medals in as many races, including silver at World Championships, to secure the overall title. Altogether Humphries and Lotholz went on to win 2 World Championship medals, 17 World Cup medals and four crystal globes in 4 years. On January 9, 2016, Lotholz was part of the first all-female team to compete against men in a four-person World Cup bobsled race; her teammates were Kaillie Humphries (pilot), Cynthia Appiah, and Genevieve Thibault. In 2018 Lotholz competed at the 2018 Winter Olympics with pilot Christine de Bruin, where they finished 7th. Following the Olympic season, Lotholz switched from her role as brakeman to pilot.

In January 2022, Lotholz was named to Canada's 2022 Olympic team.

Lotholz was named in the Canadian team for the 2026 Winter Olympics. She finished sixth in the monobob and 13th in two-woman.

== Career highlights ==
World Championships
2016 – Igls, (silver) 2nd with Kaillie Humphries
2017 – Königssee, (silver) 2nd with Kaillie Humphries

FIBT (IBSF) World Cup Overall Season Championship
Second, (silver) overall in the 2014–15 FIBT World Cup season with Kaillie Humphries
First, (gold) overall in the 2015–16 FIBT World Cup season with Kaillie Humphries
Second, (silver) overall in the 2016-17 FIBT World Cup season with Kaillie Humphries
First, (gold) overall in the 2017-18 FIBT World Cup season with Kaillie Humphries
