= Christine de Bruin =

Canadian bobsledder (born 1989)

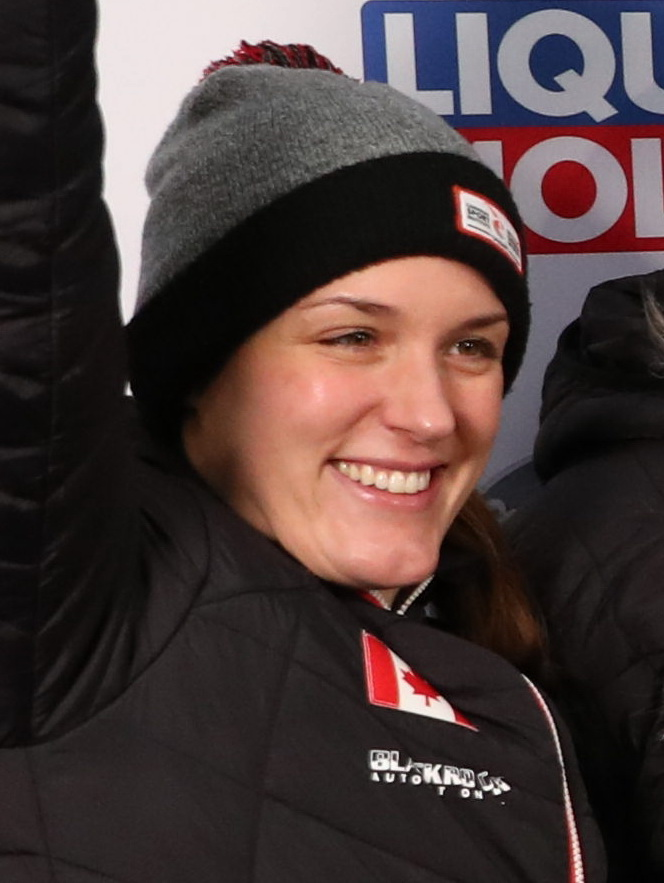
- de Bruin in 2019

Personal information
- Nationality: Canadian
- Born: 3 March 1989 (age 37) Edmonton, Alberta, Canada
- Height: 1.70 m (5 ft 7 in)
- Weight: 76 kg (168 lb)

Sport
- Country: Canada
- Sport: Bobsleigh
- Event: Two-woman
- Turned pro: 2012
Medal record
Representing Canada
Olympic Games
Bronze medal – third place	2022 Beijing	Monobob
World Championships
Silver medal – second place	2019 Whistler	Mixed team
Bronze medal – third place	2019 Whistler	Two-woman
Bronze medal – third place	2020 Altenberg	Two-woman

Christine de Bruin (née Bushie, born 3 March 1989) is a Canadian bobsledder. She competed in the two-woman event at the 2018 Winter Olympics with Melissa Lotholz. She won bronze in the women's event and a silver medal in the team relay at the 2019 Bobsled World Championships in Whistler, British Columbia.

In January 2022, De Bruin was named to Canada's 2022 Olympic team. De Bruin would go on to win the bronze medal in the inaugural monobob event.

In November 2022, the Canadian Centre for Ethics in Sport announced de Bruin had tested positive for an illicit anabolic agent of a food contamination . She was suspended from training and competition for three years. Signing the admission reduced the ban by one year. de Bruin said she was not financially able to contest the ruling.
