= An Vannieuwenhuyse =

Retired Belgian bobsledder (born 1991)

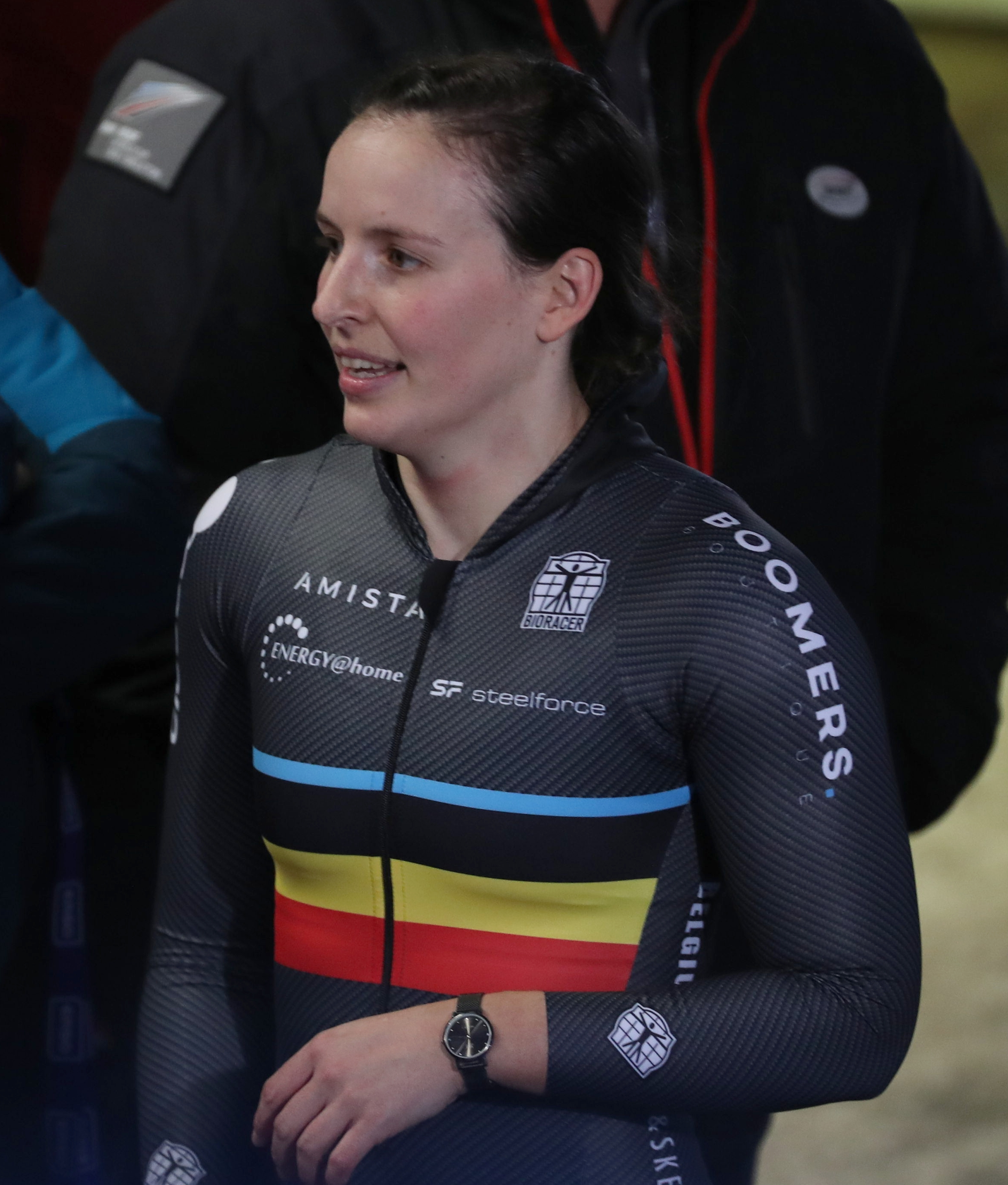
- Vannieuwenhuyse in 2020

Personal information
- Nationality: Belgian
- Born: 3 March 1991 (age 34); Jette, Belgium

Sport
- Sport: Bobsleigh

An Vannieuwenhuyse (born 3 March 1991) is a retired Belgian bobsledder. She competed in the two-woman event at the 2018 Winter Olympics. She announced her retirement from the sport in April 2021.
