= Nadezhda Sergeeva =

Russian bobsledder (born 1987)

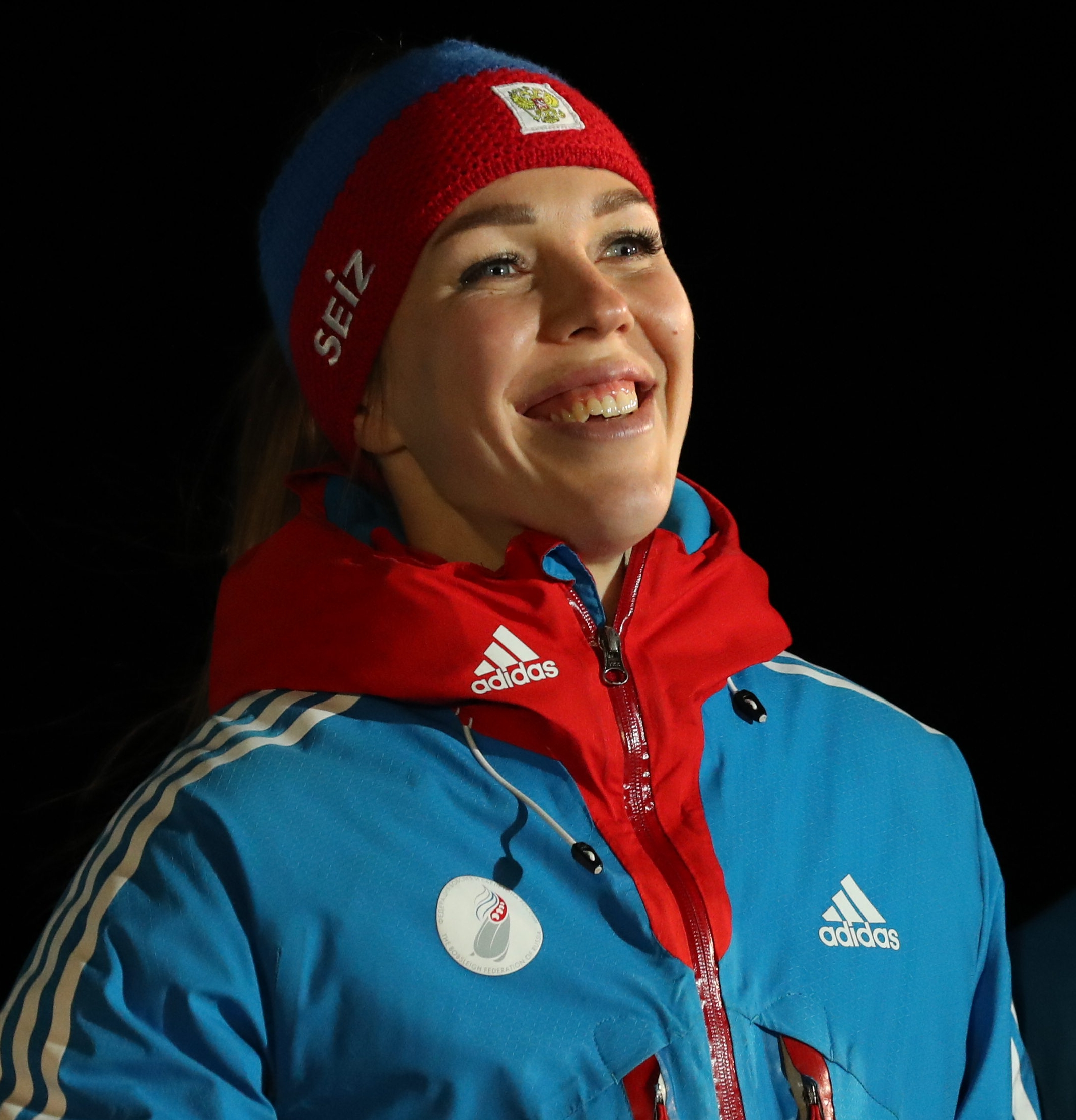
- Sergeeva in 2020

Personal information
- Full name: Nadezhda Viktorovna Sergeeva
- Nationality: Russian
- Born: 13 June 1987 (age 39) Kemerovo, Russian SSR, Soviet Union
- Height: 1.78 m (5 ft 10 in)
- Weight: 70 kg (154 lb)

Sport
- Country: Russia
- Sport: Bobsleigh; Track and field
- Event(s): Two-woman bobsleigh Heptathlon
Medal record
European Championships
| Gold medal – first place | 2020 Sigulda | Two-woman |
| Silver medal – second place | 2017 Winterberg | Two-woman |
| Bronze medal – third place | 2022 St. Moritz | Monobob |

Nadezhda Viktorovna Sergeeva (Russian: Надежда Викторовна Сергеева; born June 13, 1987) is a Russian bobsledder.

== Career ==
Prior to bobsledding, she competed in track and field, specialising in the heptathlon. She placed tenth at the 2004 World Junior Championships, was a bronze medallist at the 2009 European Athletics U23 Championships, and in her final year of competition she came 21st in the 2010 Hypo-Meeting.

Sergeeva competed at the 2014 Winter Olympics for Russia. She teamed with Nadezhda Paleeva as the Russia-2 sled in the two-woman event, finishing 16th.

As of April 2014, her best showing at the World Championships is 9th, in the 2013 team competition.

Sergeeva made her World Cup debut in February 2011. As of April 2014, her best World Cup finish is 10th, at Cesena in 2010-11.

In March 2016 it was reported that Sergeeva had failed a drug test, testing positive for meldonium. The test showed less than 1 μg meldonium.

Sergeeva and teammate Anastasia Kocherzhova won the first ever medals for Russia in the women's event at the 2017 FIBT European Championships, which took place with the World Cup tournament in Winterberg at the same time.

In February 2018, during the 2018 Winter Olympics, Sergeeva tested positive for the banned performance-enhancing drug trimetazidine. That drug is used by people with cardiac insufficiency and by athletes wishing to improve their stamina. Her mother Tatiana works as physician in the Cardiac Center of Kemerovo. Her results were annulled and she was suspended on 24 February 2018.

Sergeeva competed at the 2022 Winter Olympics.
