= Katrin Beierl =

Austrian bobsledder (born 1993)

Kati Beierl
- Beierl in 2026

Personal information
- Full name: Katrin Beierl
- Born: 16 August 1993 (age 33) Mödling, Austria
- Height: 171 cm (5 ft 7 in)
- Weight: 73 kg (161 lb)

Sport
- Country: Austria
- Sport: Bobsleigh
Medal record
Women's bobsleigh
Representing Austria
European Championships
Silver medal – second place	2026 St. Moritz	Monobob
Bronze medal – third place	2019 Königssee	Two-woman
Bronze medal – third place	2021 Winterberg	Two-woman

Katrin Beierl (born 16 August 1993) is an Austrian bobsledder. She competed in the two-woman event at the 2018 Winter Olympics. She also competed for Austria at the 2022 Winter Olympics.
