= IBSF World Championships 2016 – Four-man =

International competition in four-man bobsled

Four-man at the IBSF World Championships 2016
- Venue: Olympic Sliding Centre Innsbruck, Igls
- Date: 20–21 February 2016
- Competitors: 120 from 16 nations
- Teams: 30
- Winning time: 3:24.27

Medalists
gold medal	Oskars Melbārdis; Daumants Dreiškens; Arvis Vilkaste; Jānis Strenga	Latvia
silver medal	Francesco Friedrich; Candy Bauer; Gregor Bermbach; Thorsten Margis	Germany
bronze medal	Rico Peter; Bror van der Zijde; Thomas Amrhein; Simon Friedli	Switzerland

The Four-man event in the IBSF World Championships 2016 was held on 20 and 21 February 2016.

== Results ==
The first two runs were started at 15:34 on 20 February 2016 and the last two runs on 21 February at 15:34.

Rank	Bib	Country	Athletes	Run 1	Run 2	Run 3	Run 4	Total	Behind
1st place, gold medalist(s)	19	Latvia	Oskars Melbārdis; Daumants Dreiškens; Arvis Vilkaste; Jānis Strenga	50.92	51.22	51.15	50.98	3:24.27	
2nd place, silver medalist(s)	3	Germany	Francesco Friedrich; Candy Bauer; Gregor Bermbach; Thorsten Margis	50.61	51.12	51.39	51.19	3:24.31	+0.04
3rd place, bronze medalist(s)	1	Switzerland	Rico Peter; Bror van der Zijde; Thomas Amrhein; Simon Friedli	50.81	51.24	51.27	51.17	3:24.49	+0.22
4	4	Germany	Nico Walther; Marko Hübenbecker; Christian Poser; Eric Franke	50.77	51.23	51.44	51.22	3:24.66	+0.39
5	9	Austria	Benjamin Maier; Marco Rangl; Markus Sammer; Dănuț Moldovan	50.91	51.31	51.30	51.16	3:24.68	+0.41
6	13	Germany	Johannes Lochner; Sebastian Mrowka; Matthias Sommer; Joshua Bluhm	50.87	51.31	51.40	51.17	3:24.75	+0.48
7	2	Germany	Maximilian Arndt; Kevin Korona; Martin Putze; Ben Heber	50.83	51.23	51.40	51.30	3:24.76	+0.49
8	5	Russia	Alexander Kasjanov; Aleksei Pushkarev; Ilvir Huzin; Aleksey Zaytsev	50.76	51.25	51.55	51.37	3:24.93	+0.66
9	7	Russia	Alexey Stulnev; Maxim Mokrousov; Vasiliy Kondratenko; Roman Koshelev	51.00	51.44	51.65	51.36	3:25.45	+1.18
10	10	Latvia	Oskars Ķibermanis; Jānis Jansons; Matīss Miknis; Vairis Leiboms	51.07	51.42	51.67	51.41	3:25.57	+1.30
11	17	United Kingdom	John Jackson; Bradley Hall; John Baines; Andrew Matthews	51.22	51.53	51.64	51.39	3:25.78	+1.51
12	20	Canada	Chris Spring; Joshua Kirkpatrick; Lascelles Brown; Samuel Giguere	51.21	51.49	51.75	51.36	3:25.81	+1.54
13	18	France	Loïc Costerg; Yannis Pijar; Vincent Castell; Jérémie Boutherin	51.31	51.63	51.61	51.40	3:25.95	+1.68
14	12	Russia	Nikita Zakharov; Petr Moiseev; Yury Selikhov; Kirill Antukh	51.20	51.59	51.72	51.50	3:26.01	+1.74
15	15	United States	Nick Cunningham; Casey Wickline; James Reed; Samuel Michener	51.31	51.64	51.91	51.42	3:26.28	+2.01
16	6	Canada	Justin Kripps; Alexander Kopacz; Derek Plug; Ben Coakwell	51.17	51.86	51.89	51.59	3:26.51	+2.24
17	16	Latvia	Uģis Žaļims; Raivis Zīrups; Helvijs Lūsis; Intars Dambis	51.40	51.81	51.91	51.42	3:26.54	+2.27
18	21	South Korea	Won Yun-jong; Kim Jin-su; Kim Kyung-hyun; Oh Jea-han	51.45	51.83	51.90	51.61	3:26.79	+2.52
19	11	Italy	Simone Bertazzo; Simone Fontana; Costantino Ughi; Giovanni Mulassano	51.39	51.84	51.85	51.73	3:26.81	+2.54
20	24	Czech Republic	Dominik Dvořák; Dominik Suchý; Jan Stokláska; Jakub Nosek	51.42	51.66	52.01	51.74	3:26.83	+2.56
21	14	United States	Steven Holcomb; Frank Delduca; Carlo Valdes; Samuel McGuffie	51.52	51.67	52.02			
22	8	United Kingdom	Lamin Deen; Ben Simons; Bruce Tasker; Joel Fearon	50.86	51.17	53.22			
23	23	Switzerland	Pius Meyerhans; Marcel Dobler; Nikolai Ekimov; Marius Broening	51.50	51.77	52.19			
24	29	Brazil	Edson Bindilatti; Edson Martins; Erick Gilson; Rafael Souza	51.74	51.88	51.96			
25	22	Austria	Lukas Kolb; Markus Glück; Markus Treichl; Adrian Platzgummer	51.81	52.02	51.91			
26	30	Poland	Mateusz Luty; Jakub Zakrzewski; Łukasz Międzik; Grzegorz Kossakowski	51.90	52.03	52.16			
27	25	Netherlands	Ivo de Bruin; Rudy Mensink; Igor Brink; Dennis Veenker	51.92	52.04	52.29			
28	26	Czech Republic	Radek Matoušek; Jaroslav Kopřiva; Jan Šindelář; David Egydy	52.39	52.11	52.29			
29	28	Serbia	Vuk Radenović; Stefan Vujanić; Aleksandar Krajišnik; Damjan Zlatnar	51.83	52.45	52.70			
30	27	Romania	Dorin Grigore; Gabriel Salajan; Florin Craciun; George Nicolae	52.29	52.47	52.65			
