= Bobsleigh at the 2018 Winter Olympics – Four-man =

Four-man at the XXIII Olympic Winter Games
- Venue: Alpensia Sliding Centre near Pyeongchang, South Korea
- Dates: 24–25 February 2018
- Competitors: 116 from 18 nations
- Winning time: 3:15.85

Medalists
1st place, gold medalist(s)		Francesco Friedrich; Arndt Bauer; Martin Grothkopp; Thorsten Margis	Germany
2nd place, silver medalist(s)		Won Yun-jong; Jun Jung-lin; Seo Young-woo; Kim Dong-hyun	South Korea
2nd place, silver medalist(s)		Nico Walther; Kevin Kuske; Alexander Rödiger; Eric Franke	Germany

The four-man bobsleigh competition at the 2018 Winter Olympics was held on 24 and 25 February at the Alpensia Sliding Centre near Pyeongchang, South Korea.

== Qualification ==
The top three countries in the 2017–18 Bobsleigh season (including the World Cup, Europe races and Americas Cup) were awarded the maximum three sleds. The next six countries were awarded two sleds each. The remaining nine sleds were awarded to nine different countries, with Australia being awarded an Oceania continental quota and South Korea being awarded a slot as host nation.

== Results ==
The first two runs were held on 24 February and the last two runs on 25 February 2018.

Rank	Bib	Country	Athletes	Run 1	Run 2	Run 3	Run 4	Total	Behind
1st place, gold medalist(s)	7	Germany	Francesco Friedrich; Arndt Bauer; Martin Grothkopp; Thorsten Margis	48.54 ^{TR}	49.01	48.76	49.54	3:15.85	–
2nd place, silver medalist(s)	8	Germany	Nico Walther; Kevin Kuske; Alexander Rödiger; Eric Franke	48.74	49.16	48.90	49.58	3:16.38	+0.53
2nd place, silver medalist(s)	1	South Korea	Won Yun-jong; Jun Jung-lin; Seo Young-woo; Kim Dong-hyun	48.65	49.19	48.89	49.65	3:16.38	+0.53
4	16	Switzerland	Rico Peter; Thomas Amrhein; Simon Friedli; Michael Kuonen	49.05	49.16	48.87	49.51	3:16.59	+0.74
5	10	Latvia	Oskars Melbārdis; Daumants Dreiškens; Arvis Vilkaste; Jānis Strenga	48.82	49.39	48.91	49.53	3:16.65	+0.80
6	9	Canada	Justin Kripps; Jesse Lumsden; Alexander Kopacz; Oluseyi Smith	48.85	49.28	48.95	49.61	3:16.69	+0.84
7	14	Austria	Benjamin Maier; Kilian Walch; Markus Sammer; Dănuț Moldovan	49.10	49.21	49.03	49.56	3:16.90	+1.05
8	6	Germany	Johannes Lochner; Christian Poser; Christopher Weber; Christian Rasp	48.95	49.26	49.10	49.80	3:17.11	+1.26
9	13	United States	Codie Bascue; Evan Weinstock; Steven Langton; Sam McGuffie	49.09	49.26	49.08	49.77	3:17.28	+1.43
10	12	Latvia	Oskars Ķibermanis; Jānis Jansons; Helvijs Lūsis; Matīss Miknis	49.18	49.26	49.34	49.63	3:17.41	+1.56
11	18	France	Loïc Costerg; Vincent Ricard; Vincent Castell; Dorian Hauterville	49.09	49.36	49.19	49.92	3:17.56	+1.71
12	21	Canada	Nick Poloniato; Cameron Stones; Joshua Kirkpatrick; Ben Coakwell	49.40	49.23	49.51	49.67	3:17.81	+1.96
13	5	Poland	Mateusz Luty; Arnold Zdebiak; Łukasz Miedzik; Grzegorz Kossakowski	49.04	49.59	49.46	49.80	3:17.89	+2.04
14	3	Switzerland	Clemens Bracher; Alain Knuser; Martin Meier; Fabio Badraun	49.06	49.54	49.59	49.72	3:17.91	+2.06
15	20	Olympic Athletes from Russia	Maxim Andrianov; Alexey Zaitsev; Vasiliy Kondratenko; Ruslan Samitov	49.43	49.39	49.56	49.56	3:17.94	+2.09
16	11	Canada	Christopher Spring; Lascelles Brown; Bryan Barnett; Neville Wright	49.06	49.54	49.46	49.86	3:17.96	+2.11
17	17	Great Britain	Brad Hall; Nick Gleeson; Joel Fearon; Greg Cackett	49.25	49.68	49.64	49.69	3:18.26	+2.41
18	15	Great Britain	Lamin Deen; Ben Simons; Toby Olubi; Andrew Matthews	49.44	49.45	49.66	49.74	3:18.29	+2.44
19	22	United States	Nick Cunningham; Hakeem Abdul-Saboor; Christopher Kinney; Samuel Michener	49.60	49.50	49.74	49.70	3:18.54	+2.69
20	19	United States	Justin Olsen; Nathan Weber; Carlo Valdes; Christopher Fogt	49.62	49.71	49.66	49.56	3:18.55	+2.70
21	2	Czech Republic	Dominik Dvořák; Jaroslav Kopřiva; Jan Šindelář; Jakub Nosek	49.07	49.97	50.05	—N/a	2:29.09	—N/a
22	24	Austria	Markus Treichl; Ekemini Bassey; Markus Glueck; Marco Rangl	49.73	49.83	49.68	—N/a	2:29.24	—N/a
23	23	Brazil	Edson Bindilatti; Edson Ricardo Martins; Odirlei Pessoni; Rafael Souza da Silva	49.75	49.94	49.80	—N/a	2:29.49	—N/a
24	28	Czech Republic	Jan Vrba; Dominik Suchý; David Egydy; Jan Stokláska	49.73	49.81	50.05	—N/a	2:29.59	—N/a
25	4	Australia	Lucas Mata; David Mari; Lachlan Reidy; Hayden Smith	49.72	49.91	50.07	—N/a	2:29.70	—N/a
26	26	China	Shao Yijun; Li Chunjian; Wang Sidong; Shi Hao	49.79	50.01	49.94	—N/a	2:29.74	—N/a
27	25	Italy	Simone Bertazzo; Lorenzo Bilotti; Francesco Costa; Simone Fontana	49.92	49.94	50.02	—N/a	2:29.88	—N/a
28	27	Croatia	Dražen Silić; Mate Mezulić; Benedikt Nikpalj; Antonio Zelić	50.18	50.64	50.63	—N/a	2:31.45	—N/a
29	29	Romania	Dorin Alexandru Grigore; Florin Cezar Crăciun; Levente Bartha; Paul Septimiu Muntean	50.55	50.79	50.81	—N/a	2:32.15	—N/a
