= 2016–17 Bobsleigh World Cup =

Winners
- Two-man: Francesco Friedrich (GER)
- Four-man: Alexander Kasjanov (RUS)
- Combined men's: Francesco Friedrich (GER)
- Two-woman: Jamie Greubel Poser (USA)

Competitions
- Venues: 8 (8 events)

The 2016–17 Bobsleigh World Cup was a multi-race series over a season for bobsleigh. The season started on 28 November 2016 in Whistler, Canada and ended on 19 March 2017 in Pyeongchang, South Korea. The World Cup was organised by the IBSF (formerly the FIBT) who also run World Cups and Championships in skeleton. The season was sponsored by BMW.

== Calendar ==
Below is the schedule of the 2016/17 season.

Venue	Date	Details
(Canada) Whistler	2–3 December 2016	
(United States) Lake Placid	16–17 December 2016	
(Germany) Altenberg	6–8 January 2017	
(Germany) Winterberg	13–15 January 2017	
(Switzerland) St. Moritz	20–22 January 2017	
(Germany) Königssee	27–29 January 2017	
(Austria) Igls	3–5 February 2017	
(South Korea) Pyeongchang	17–19 March 2017	

== Results ==
=== Two-man ===
Event:	Gold:	Time	Silver:	Time	Bronze:	Time
(Canada) Whistler	Francesco Friedrich; Thorsten Margis; Germany	1:44.21 (51.92 / 52.29)	Rico Peter; Thomas Amrhein; Switzerland	1:44.67 (52.21 / 52.46)	Won Yun-jong; Seo Young-woo; South Korea	1:44.69 (51.96 / 52.73)
(United States) Lake Placid	Steven Holcomb; Samuel McGuffie; United States	1:49.47 (54.66 / 54.81)	Justin Kripps; Jesse Lumsden; Canada	1:49.74 (54.87 / 54.87)	Chris Spring; Lascelles Brown; Canada	1:49.75 (54.80 / 54.95)
(Germany) Altenberg	Francesco Friedrich; Martin Grothkopp; Germany	1:49.20 (54.48 / 54.72)	Alexander Kasjanov; Aleksei Pushkarev; Russia	1:49.84 (54.77 / 55.07)	Oskars Ķibermanis; Matīss Miknis; Latvia	1:49.90 (54.93 / 54.97)
(Germany) Winterberg	Francesco Friedrich; Martin Grothkopp; Germany	1:51.67 (55.86 / 55.81)	Johannes Lochner; Joshua Bluhm; Germany	1:52.38 (56.22 / 56.16)	Oskars Ķibermanis; Matīss Miknis; Latvia	1:52.44 (56.29 / 56.15)
(Switzerland) St. Moritz	Johannes Lochner; Christian Rasp; Germany	2:10.63 (1:05.40 / 1:05.23)	Francesco Friedrich; Martin Grothkopp; Germany	2:10.91 (1:05.69 / 1:05.22)	Steven Holcomb; Carlo Valdes; United States	2:11.30 (1:05.85 / 1:05.45)
(Germany) Königssee	Johannes Lochner; Joshua Bluhm; Germany	1:38.54 (49.12 / 49.42)	Francesco Friedrich; Thorsten Margis; Germany; Steven Holcomb; Carlo Valdes; United States	1:38.77 (49.26 / 49.51); 1:38.77 (49.21 / 49.56)		
(Austria) Igls	Francesco Friedrich; Thorsten Margis; Germany	1:42.92 (51.25 / 51.67)	Oskars Melbārdis; Jānis Strenga; Latvia	1:43.65 (51.58 / 52.07)	Benjamin Maier; Thomas Sammer; Austria	1:43.72 (51.64 / 52.08)
(South Korea) Pyeongchang	Francesco Friedrich; Thorsten Margis; Germany	1:40.82 (50.24 / 50.58)	Oskars Ķibermanis; Matīss Miknis; Latvia	1:41.12 (50.46 / 50.66)	Johannes Lochner; Joshua Bluhm; Germany	1:41.16 (50.66 / 50.50)

=== Four-man ===
Event:	Gold:	Time	Silver:	Time	Bronze:	Time
(Canada) Whistler	Alexander Kasjanov; Alexey Zaitsev; Aleksei Pushkarev; Maxim Belugin; Russia	1:42.51 (51.17 / 51.34)	Rico Peter; Bror van der Zijde; Simon Friedli; Thomas Amrhein; Switzerland	1:42.71 (51.28 / 51.43)	Johannes Lochner; Matthias Kagerhuber; Sebastian Mrowka; Christian Rasp; Germany	1:42.94 (51.52 / 51.42)
(United States) Lake Placid	Rico Peter; Bror van der Zijde; Simon Friedli; Thomas Amrhein; Switzerland	1:48.31 (54.11 / 54.20)	Steven Holcomb; Carlo Valdes; James Reed; Samuel McGuffie; United States	1:48.70 (54.22 / 54.48)	Chris Spring; Cameron Stones; Lascelles Brown; Samuel Giguère; Canada	1:48.71 (54.25 / 54.46)
(Germany) Altenberg	Johannes Lochner; Sebastian Mrowka; Joshua Bluhm; Christian Rasp; Germany	1:48.73 (54.28 / 54.45)	Alexander Kasjanov; Alexey Zaitsev; Aleksei Pushkarev; Maxim Belugin; Russia	1:49.14 (54.55 / 54.59)	Francesco Friedrich; Candy Bauer; Martin Grothkopp; Thorsten Margis; Germany	1:49.40 (54.52 / 54.88)
(Germany) Winterberg	Johannes Lochner; Sebastian Mrowka; Joshua Bluhm; Christian Rasp; Germany	1:48.95 (54.50 / 54.45)	Nico Walther; Kevin Kuske; Kevin Korona; Eric Franke; Germany	1:49.40 (54.63 / 54.77)	Benjamin Maier; Stefan Laussegger; Markus Sammer; Daniel Moldovan; Austria	1:49.42 (54.72 / 54.70)
(Switzerland) St. Moritz	Oskars Ķibermanis; Jānis Jansons; Matīss Miknis; Raivis Zīrups; Latvia	2:08.60 (1:04.55 / 1:04.05)	Oskars Melbārdis; Daumants Dreiškens; Arvis Vilkaste; Jānis Strenga; Latvia	2:08.73 (1:04.56 / 1:04.17)	Francesco Friedrich; Candy Bauer; Martin Grothkopp; Thorsten Margis; Germany	2:08.90 (1:04.73 / 1:04.17)
(Germany) Königssee	Johannes Lochner; Matthias Kagerhuber; Joshua Bluhm; Christian Rasp; Germany	1:37.17 (48.45 / 48.72)	Nico Walther; Kevin Kuske; Kevin Korona; Eric Franke; Germany	1:37.42 (48.59 / 48.83)	Alexey Stulnev; Ilvir Huzin; Maxim Belugin; Roman Koshelev; Russia	1:37.49 (48.63 / 48.86)
(Austria) Igls	Oskars Melbārdis; Daumants Dreiškens; Arvis Vilkaste; Jānis Strenga; Latvia	1:42.01 (50.88 / 51.13)	Rico Peter; Simon Friedli; Alex Baumann; Thomas Amrhein; Switzerland	1:42.06 (50.98 / 51.08)	Steven Holcomb; Carlo Valdes; James Reed; Samuel McGuffie; United States	1:42.07 (50.95 / 51.12)
(South Korea) Pyeongchang	Alexander Kasjanov; Aleksei Pushkarev; Vasiliy Kondratenko; Alexey Zaitsev; Russia	1:39.96 (49.99 / 49.97)	Rico Peter; Bror van der Zijde; Alex Baumann; Thomas Amrhein; Switzerland	1:40.19 (50.15 / 50.04)	Oskars Ķibermanis; Jānis Jansons; Matīss Miknis; Raivis Zīrups; Latvia	1:40.22 (50.07 / 50.15)

=== Two-woman ===
Event:	Gold:	Time	Silver:	Time	Bronze:	Time
(Canada) Whistler	Kaillie Humphries; Cynthia Appiah; Canada	1:46.53 (53.19 / 53.34)	Christina Hengster; Sanne Dekker; Austria	1:46.77 (53.37 / 53.40)	Jamie Greubel Poser; Lauren Gibbs; United States	1:46.86 (53.31 / 53.55)
(United States) Lake Placid	Jamie Greubel Poser; Aja Evans; United States	1:52.02 (55.81 / 56.21)	Elana Meyers Taylor; Lolo Jones; United States	1:52.16 (55.95 / 56.21)	Kaillie Humphries; Cynthia Appiah; Canada	1:53.05 (56.40 / 56.65)
(Germany) Altenberg	Kaillie Humphries; Melissa Lotholz; Canada	1:54.15 (57.10 / 57.05)	Elana Meyers Taylor; Kehri Jones; United States	1:54.85 (57.24 / 57.61)	Christina Hengster; Sanne Dekker; Austria	1:54.93 (57.38 / 57.55)
(Germany) Winterberg	Elana Meyers Taylor; Kehri Jones; United States	1:54.43 (57.30 / 57.13)	Mariama Jamanka; Annika Drazek; Germany	1:54.50 (57.24 / 57.26)	Jamie Greubel Poser; Aja Evans; United States	1:54.67 (57.29 / 57.38)
(Switzerland) St. Moritz	Elana Meyers Taylor; Briauna Jones; United States	2:16.14 (1:08.41 / 1:07.73)	Kaillie Humphries; Melissa Lotholz; Canada	2:16.15 (1:08.35 / 1:07.80)	Jamie Greubel Poser; Lauren Gibbs; United States	2:16.29 (1:08.38 / 1:07.91)
(Germany) Königssee	Elana Meyers Taylor; Kehri Jones; United States	1:41.01 (50.36 / 50.65)	Jamie Greubel Poser; Aja Evans; United States	1:41.27 (50.49 / 50.78)	Mariama Jamanka; Annika Drazek; Germany	1:41.67 (50.61 / 51.06)
(Austria) Igls	Elana Meyers Taylor; Lolo Jones; United States	1:46.14 (53.01 / 53.13)	Kaillie Humphries; Melissa Lotholz; Canada	1:46.39 (53.19 / 53.20)	Jamie Greubel Poser; Aja Evans; United States	1:46.53 (53.20 / 53.33)
(South Korea) Pyeongchang	Jamie Greubel Poser; Aja Evans; United States	1:43.65 (51.79 / 51.86)	Elana Meyers Taylor; Lolo Jones; United States	1:43.80 (51.71 / 52.09)	Alysia Rissling; Cynthia Appiah; Canada	1:44.06 (52.10 / 51.96)

== Standings ==
=== Two-man ===
Pos.	Racer	(Canada) WHI	(United States) LPL	(Germany) ALT	(Germany) WIN	(Switzerland) STM	(Germany) KON	(Austria) IGL	(South Korea) PYE	Points
1	Francesco Friedrich (GER)	1	–	1	1	2	2	1	1	1545
2	Steven Holcomb (USA)	11	1	8	10	3	2	10	14	1331
3	Won Yun-jong (KOR)	3	4	5	8	8	16	11	5	1312
4	Johannes Lochner (GER)	4	–	11	2	1	1	16	3	1284
5	Alexander Kasjanov (RUS)	9	5	2	9	9	10	6	16	1266
6	Alexey Stulnev (RUS)	8	9	7	4	11	4	17	13	1208
7	Benjamin Maier (AUT)	17	12	4	7	7	7	3	25	1152
8	Oskars Ķibermanis (LAT)	–	–	3	3	5	5	8	2	1138
9	Justin Kripps (CAN)	4	2	14	18	21	11	5	8	1136
10	Rico Peter (SUI)	2	6	10	5	15	12	19	23	1070
11	Nico Walther (GER)	15	–	6	13	4	13	15	11	952
12	Uģis Žaļims (LAT)	–	–	9	5	10	9	9	9	936
13	Chris Spring (CAN)	10	3	–	23	14	15	13	7	898
14	Kim Dong-hyun (KOR)	6	7	12	16	16	19	20	21	868
15	Justin Olsen (USA)	7	8	–	17	23	29	4	6	858
16	Oskars Melbārdis (LAT)	–	–	13	–	6	6	2	12	810
17	Codie Bascue (USA)	12	10	17	19	28	20	21	10	736
18	Nick Poloniato (CAN)	14	13	–	22	19	24	18	4	679
19	Bruce Tasker (GBR)	19	–	dsq	12	13	8	12	20	678
20	Maxim Andrianov (RUS)	13	11	15	15	24	18	26	24	670
21	Rudy Rinaldi (MON)	15	14	–	–	16	14	13	22	600
22	Dominik Dvorak (CZE)	–	–	18	21	18	–	6	15	502
23	Beat Hefti (SUI)	–	–	16	11	20	26	22	18	472
24	Mateusz Luty (POL)	–	–	–	14	11	16	–	16	440
25	Ivo de Bruin (NED)	20	17	–	25	25	22	23	28	370
26	Lamin Deen (GBR)	18	15	21	24	27	–	–	–	323
27	Simone Bertazzo (ITA)	–	–	20	20	22	24	–	dns	237
28	Loic Costerg (FRA)	21	16	–	–	–	21	–	–	220
29	Jan Vrba (CZE)	–	–	19	26	26	23	29	31	220
30	Edson Bindilatti (BRA)	23	19	–	–	–	–	–	25	164
31	Lucas Mata (AUS)	22	18	–	–	–	–	–	29	160
32	Bradley Hall (GBR)	–	–	–	–	–	27	24	19	151
33	Markus Treichl (AUT)	–	–	22	–	29	28	31	30	128
34	Dorin Grigore (ROU)	–	–	23	27	30	30	32	–	122
35	Patrick Baumgartner (ITA)	–	–	–	–	–	–	28	27	60
36	Romain Heinrich (FRA)	–	–	–	–	–	–	25	–	40
37	Simone Fontana (ITA)	–	–	–	–	–	–	27	–	32
38	Vuk Rađenović (SRB)	–	–	–	–	–	–	29	–	24

=== Four-man ===
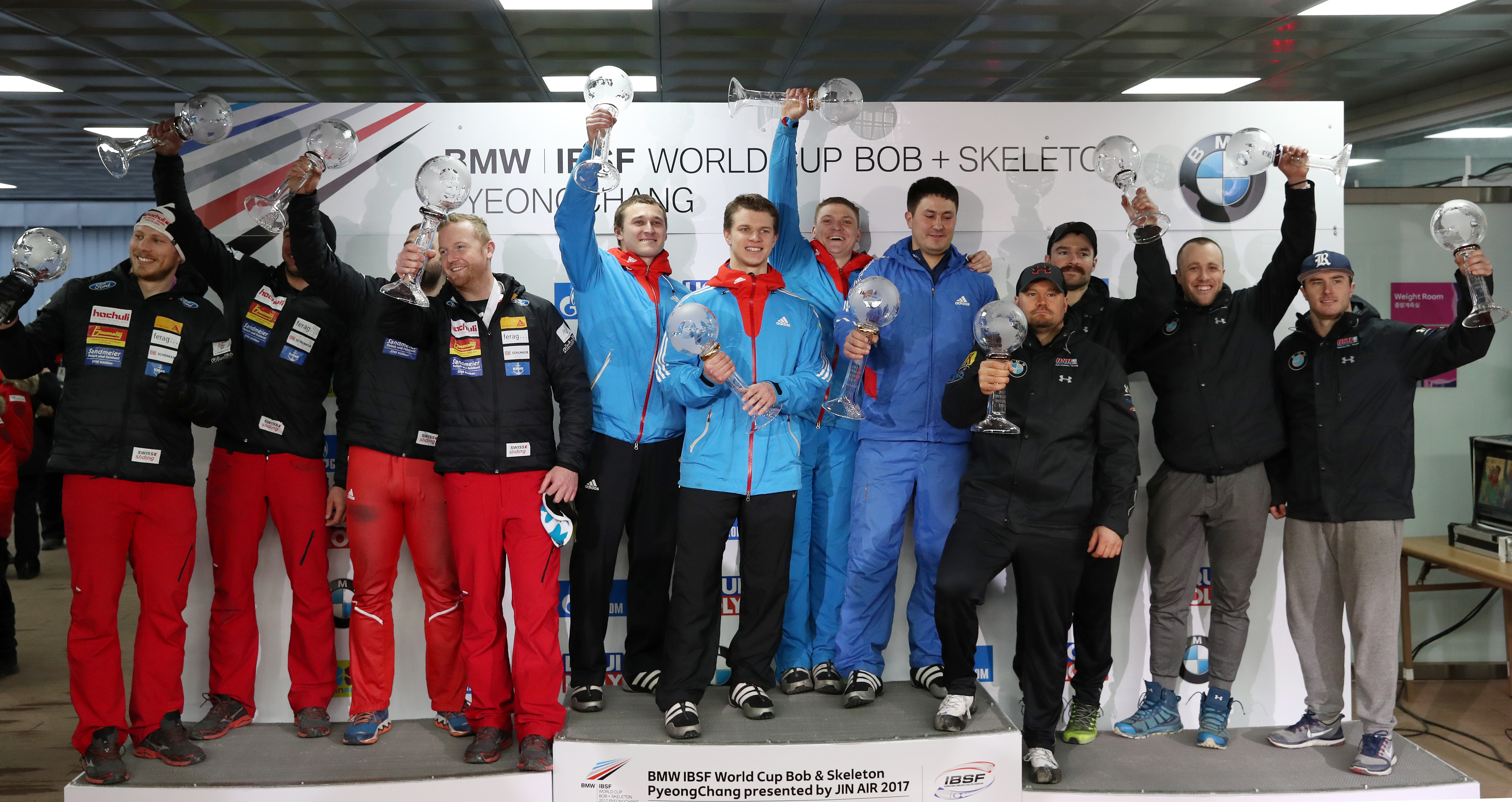
2016–17 Overall Four-man Champions podium: Kasjanov-Russia (Champions, center), Peter-Switzerland (Silver, left), Holcomb-USA (Bronze, right). Two of these pilots also finished on the podium for the 2016–17 Overall Combined Champions, with Kasjanov-Russia taking Silver and Holcomb-USA taking Bronze

Pos.	Racer	(Canada) WHI	(United States) LPL	(Germany) ALT	(Germany) WIN	(Switzerland) STM	(Germany) KON	(Austria) IGL	(South Korea) PYE	Points
1	Alexander Kasjanov (RUS)	1	8	2	4	8	6	9	1	1500
2	Rico Peter (SUI)	2	1	5	14	5	11	2	2	1471
3	Steven Holcomb (USA)	4	2	9	7	15	4	3	10	1362
4	Alexey Stulnev (RUS)	8	7	8	5	9	3	5	19	1282
5	Nico Walther (GER)	10	–	6	2	7	2	6	5	1268
6	Johannes Lochner (GER)	3	–	1	1	4	1	dsq	6	1243
7	Francesco Friedrich (GER)	12	–	3	5	3	5	4	11	1224
8	Benjamin Maier (AUT)	13	10	4	3	11	9	14	16	1152
9	Maxim Andrianov (RUS)	7	16	10	8	10	8	11	12	1136
10	Justin Kripps (CAN)	5	9	14	9	16	16	7	9	1112
11	Oskars Ķibermanis (LAT)	–	–	7	10	1	14	8	3	1009
12	Lamin Deen (GBR)	9	6	12	12	14	17	20	18	932
13	Oskars Melbārdis (LAT)	–	–	11	–	2	7	1	4	931
14	Chris Spring (CAN)	6	3	–	21	6	19	16	13	904
15	Won Yun-jong (KOR)	–	5	–	11	22	18	12	7	752
16	Codie Bascue (USA)	15	4	15	13	30	21	25	20	710
17	Loic Costerg (FRA)	14	11	–	–	12	13	–	14	608
18	Jan Vrba (CZE)	–	–	17	17	23	10	14	17	570
19	Justin Olsen (USA)	–	12	–	18	19	26	21	15	484
20	Nick Poloniato (CAN)	11	dnf	–	19	17	23	22	25	444
21	Bradley Hall (GRB)	–	–	–	–	–	12	18	8	368
22	Rudy Rinaldi (MON)	–	–	–	–	13	15	10	–	368
23	Uģis Žaļims (LAT)	–	–	18	15	18	–	17	–	352
24	Ivo de Bruin (NED)	19	15	–	24	23	27	27	–	337
25	Simone Bertazzo (ITA)	–	–	13	16	26	25	–	dns	292
26	Markus Treichl (AUT)	–	–	–	–	20	20	23	22	242
27	Dominik Dvorak (CZE)	–	–	19	22	27	–	19	–	236
28	Edson Bindilatti (BRA)	16	14	–	–	–	–	–	–	208
29	Oliver Biddulph (GBR)	–	–	16	20	29	–	–	–	188
30	Dorin Alexandru Grigore (ROU)	–	–	20	25	28	dsq	26	–	172
31	Mateusz Luty (POL)	–	–	–	26	23	22	–	–	142
32	Clemens Bracher (SUI)	–	–	–	–	–	-	12	–	128
33	Elana Meyers Taylor (USA)	–	13	–	–	–	–	–	–	120
34	Beat Hefti (SUI)	–	–	–	23	21	–	–	–	112
35	Pius Meyerhans (SUI)	–	–	–	–	–	24	–	21	107
36	Nick Cunningham (USA)	17	–	–	–	–	–	–	–	88
37	Suk Young-jin (KOR)	18	–	–	–	–	–	–	–	80
38	Patrick Baumgartner (ITA)	–	–	–	–	-	-	28	23	78
39	Kaillie Humphries (CAN)	–	dns	–	27	32	–	29	–	56
40	Lucas Mata (AUS)	–	–	–	–	–	–	–	24	45
41	Vuk Rađenović (SRB)	–	-	–	-	-	–	24	–	45
42	Thomas Heibl (NOR)	–	–	–	–	31	28	–	–	28
43	Alysia Rissling (CAN)	–	–	–	–	-	-	30	–	20
44	Maria Adela Constantin (ROM)	–	–	–	–	-	-	31	–	0

=== Two-woman ===
Pos.	Racer	(Canada) WHI	(United States) LPL	(Germany) ALT	(Germany) WIN	(Switzerland) STM	(Germany) KON	(Austria) IGL	(South Korea) PYE	Points
1	Jamie Greubel Poser (USA)	3	1	5	3	3	2	3	1	1644
2	Kaillie Humphries (CAN)	1	3	1	5	2	4	2	5	1630
3	Elana Meyers Taylor (USA)	dsq	2	2	1	1	1	1	2	1530
4	Christina Hengster (AUT)	2	6	3	6	5	8	8	12	1394
5	Nadezhda Sergeeva (RUS)	5	9	9	4	6	5	10	6	1360
6	Aleksandra Rodionova (RUS)	6	7	7	7	10	7	7	13	1280
7	Mariama Jamanka (GER)	11	–	10	2	4	3	5	4	1258
8	Alysia Rissling (CAN)	4	5	–	11	–	9	9	3	1016
9	Brittany Reinbolt (USA)	7	4	–	13	14	15	6	11	1008
10	Elfje Willemsen (BEL)	–	–	6	8	9	6	14	14	888
11	An Vannieuwenhuyse (BEL)	–	–	4	12	11	11	17	8	840
12	Maria Adela Constantin (ROU)	13	13	8	14	15	–	20	22	740
13	Mica McNeill (GBR)	8	14	dsq	10	7	–	12	–	712
14	Maria Oshigiri (JPN)	–	–	12	15	12	10	15	16	704
15	Christin Senkel (GER)	–	–	11	8	7	12	–	15	696
16	Christine de Bruin (CAN)	12	8	–	18	–	16	11	17	688
17	Andreea Grecu (ROU)	–	11	–	16	16	–	13	9	600
18	Stephanie Schneider (GER)	–	–	–	–	–	13	4	7	480
19	Sabina Hafner (SUI)	–	–	–	–	13	13	16	10	480
20	Kim Yoo-ran (KOR)	9	10	–	–	–	–	–	18	376
21	Minami Homma (JPN)	–	–	13	19	19	18	–	–	348
22	Lee Seon-hye (KOR)	10	12	–	–	–	–	–	20	340
23	Konomi Asazu (JPN)	–	–	–	–	17	19	21	19	298
24	Katrin Beierl (AUT)	–	–	–	–	20	17	19	21	292
25	Lien de Decker (BEL)	–	–	–	17	18	dsq	22	–	224
26	Martina Fontanive (SUI)	–	–	–	–	–	–	18	–	80

== Medal table ==
Rank	Nation	Gold	Silver	Bronze	Total
1	Germany	10	6	5	21
2	United States	7	6	6	19
3	Canada	2	3	4	9
4	Latvia	2	3	3	8
5	Russia	2	2	1	5
6	Switzerland	1	4	0	5
7	Austria	0	1	3	4
8	South Korea	0	0	1	1
Totals (8 entries)		24	25	23	72
