= IBSF World Championships 2017 – Two-man =

Two-man at the IBSF World Championships 2017
- Venue: Königssee bobsleigh, luge, and skeleton track
- Location: Königssee, Germany
- Dates: 18–19 February
- Competitors: 72 from 36 nations
- Teams: 36
- Winning time: 3:16.71

Medalists
gold medal	Francesco Friedrich; Thorsten Margis	Germany
silver medal	Justin Kripps; Jesse Lumsden	Canada
bronze medal	Johannes Lochner; Joshua Bluhm	Germany

The Two-man competition at the 2017 World Championships was held on 18 and 19 February 2017.

== Results ==
The first two runs were held on 18 and the two last runs on 19 February 2017.

Rank	Bib	Country	Athletes	Run 1	Rank	Run 2	Rank	Run 3	Rank	Run 4	Rank	Total	Behind
1st place, gold medalist(s)	6	Germany	Francesco Friedrich; Thorsten Margis	49.15	1	49.45	1	49.17	1	48.94	1	3:16.71	
2nd place, silver medalist(s)	11	Canada	Justin Kripps; Jesse Lumsden	49.44	2	49.68	2	49.43	3	49.36	6	3:17.91	+1.20
3rd place, bronze medalist(s)	9	Germany	Johannes Lochner; Joshua Bluhm	49.51	3	49.72	4	49.46	5	49.27	2	3:17.96	+1.25
4	7	Latvia	Oskars Ķibermanis; Matīss Miknis	49.55	4	49.88	11	49.42	2	49.32	5	3:18.17	+1.46
5	1	Canada	Nick Poloniato; Neville Weight	49.62	9	49.71	3	49.61	12	49.29	3	3:18.23	+1.52
6	20	Latvia	Oskars Melbārdis; Jānis Strenga	49.57	5	49.80	6	49.59	10	49.39	7	3:18.35	+1.64
7	13	United States	Steven Holcomb; Carlo Valdes	49.71	14	49.76	5	49.49	6	49.43	9	3:18.39	+1.68
8	5	Germany	Nico Walther; Eric Franke	49.59	6	49.91	14	49.53	8	49.42	8	3:18.45	+1.74
9	18	Great Britain	Bruce Tasker; Joel Fearon	49.64	11	49.84	9	49.66	16	49.56	12	3:18.59	+1.88
10	25	Monaco	Rudy Rinaldi; Boris Vain	49.75	15	49.88	11	49.54	9	49.44	10	3:18.60	+1.89
11	17	United States	Justin Olsen; Evan Weinstock	49.95	22	49.83	8	49.45	4	49.44	10	3:18.67	+1.96
11	12	Austria	Benjamin Maier; Markus Sammer	49.63	10	50.24	28	49.50	7	49.30	4	3:18.67	+1.96
13	19	Canada	Christopher Spring; Alexander Kopacz	49.68	13	49.87	10	49.60	11	49.60	16	3:18.75	+2.04
14	16	Latvia	Uģis Žaļims; Jānis Jansons	49.91	20	49.80	6	49.63	13	49.46	13	3:18.80	+2.09
15	4	Switzerland	Beat Hefti; Michael Kuonen	49.60	7	49.92	15	49.68	17	49.65	18	3:18.85	+2.14
16	8	Switzerland	Rico Peter; Simon Friedli	49.60	7	49.99	17	49.74	18	49.63	17	3:18.96	+2.25
17	14	Russia	Alexey Stulnev; Maxim Belugin	49.74	15	49.89	13	49.78	19	49.58	15	3:18.99	+2.28
18	24	Czech Republic	Dominik Dvořák; Jakub Nosek	49.90	19	49.92	15	49.64	15	49.56	14	3:19.02	+2.31
19	15	Russia	Alexander Kasjanov; Aleksei Pushkarev	49.78	17	50.10	21	49.63	13	49.73	19	3:19.24	+2.53
20	27	Poland	Mateusz Luty; Krzysztof Tylkowski	49.84	18	50.03	18	49.79	20	49.80	20	3:19.46	+2.75
—	10	South Korea	Won Yun-jong; Seo Young-woo	49.65	12	50.06	20	49.96	28	DNQ			
—	2	South Korea	Kim Dong-hyun; Jun Jung-lin	49.91	20	50.05	19	49.80	21	DNQ			
—	22	United States	Nick Cunningham; Adrian Adams	49.96	23	50.22	25	49.87	23	DNQ			
—	23	Russia	Maxim Andrianov; Kirill Antukh	50.07	25	50.15	23	49.83	22	DNQ			
—	21	Germany	Richard Ölsner; Alexander Schüller	50.10	28	50.22	25	49.88	24	DNQ			
—	32	France	Loïc Costerg; Vincent Castell	50.09	27	50.25	29	49.94	26	DNQ			
—	28	Netherlands	Ivo de Bruin; Jeroen Piek	50.07	25	50.23	27	50.04	30	DNQ			
—	33	Great Britain	Bradley Hall; Samuel Blanchet	50.04	24	50.11	22	50.23	34	DNQ			
—	30	Austria	Markus Treichl; Markus Glück	50.17	31	50.43	31	49.90	25	DNQ			
—	31	Czech Republic	Jan Vrba; Dominik Suchý	50.11	29	50.48	32	49.95	27	DNQ			
—	3	Italy	Simone Bertazzo; Mattia Variola	50.11	29	50.34	30	50.18	33	DNQ			
—	26	South Korea	Suk Young-jin; Oh Jea-han	50.49	33	50.20	24	49.97	29	DNQ			
—	29	Italy	Patrick Baumgartner; Costantino Ughi	50.25	32	50.54	33	50.13	32	DNQ			
—	34	Romania	Mihai Tentea; Florin Cezar Crăciun	50.63	34	50.58	34	50.11	31	DNQ			
—	35	Serbia	Vuk Rađenović; Miroslav Novaković	50.66	35	50.81	35	50.52	35	DNQ			
—	36	Croatia	Dražen Silić; Mate Mezulić	51.22	36	51.46	36	51.09	36	DNQ			
