= IBSF World Championships 2016 – Two-man =

Two-man bobsleigh at the IBSF World Championships 2016
- Venue: Olympic Sliding Centre Innsbruck, Igls
- Date: 13–14 February
- Competitors: 78 from 19 nations
- Teams: 34
- Winning time: 3:26.09

Medalists
gold medal	Francesco Friedrich; Thorsten Margis	Germany
silver medal	Johannes Lochner; Joshua Bluhm	Germany
bronze medal	Beat Hefti; Alex Baumann	Switzerland

The Two-man bobsleigh event in the IBSF World Championships 2016 was held on 13–14 February 2016.

== Results ==
The first two runs were started at 09:34 on 13 February 2016 and the last two runs on 14 February at 09:34.

Rank	Bib	Country	Athletes	Run 1	Run 2	Run 3	Run 4	Total	Behind
1st place, gold medalist(s)	10	Germany	Francesco Friedrich; Thorsten Margis	51.68	51.59	51.32	51.50	3:26.09	
2nd place, silver medalist(s)	16	Germany	Johannes Lochner; Joshua Bluhm	51.57	51.55	51.47	51.67	3:26.26	+0.17
3rd place, bronze medalist(s)	15	Switzerland	Beat Hefti; Alex Baumann	51.68	51.66	51.37	51.60	3:26.31	+0.22
4	23	United Kingdom	Bruce Tasker; Joel Fearon	51.83	51.66	51.40	51.62	3:26.51	+0.42
5	2	Latvia	Oskars Melbārdis; Daumants Dreiškens	51.54	51.75	51.58	51.72	3:26.59	+0.50
6	11	Canada	Christopher Spring; Lascelles Brown	51.76	51.71	51.57	51.74	3:26.78	+0.69
7	3	South Korea	Won Yun-jong; Seo Young-woo	51.69	51.82	51.59	52.02	3:27.12	+1.03
8	5	Canada	Justin Kripps; Alexander Kopacz	51.74	51.96	51.76	51.85	3:27.31	+1.22
9	25	Austria	Benjamin Maier; Markus Sammer	51.93	51.85	51.71	51.86	3:27.35	+1.26
10	6	Switzerland	Rico Peter; Thomas Amrhein	51.80	51.88	51.65	52.09	3:27.42	+1.33
11	1	Germany	Nico Walther; Christian Poser	51.71	52.03	51.86	52.07	3:27.67	+1.58
12	7	Germany	Maximilian Arndt; Kevin Kuske	51.98	51.99	51.87	51.84	3:27.68	+1.59
13	14	Russia	Alexey Stulnev; Maxim Belugin	52.01	51.93	51.87	51.91	3:27.72	+1.63
14	13	Latvia	Oskars Ķibermanis; Matīss Miknis	52.09	52.00	51.90	51.85	3:27.84	+1.75
15	12	United States	Nick Cunningham; Casey Wickline	51.98	51.98	51.93	51.98	3:27.87	+1.78
15	4	Latvia	Uģis Žaļims; Intars Dambis	52.00	51.96	51.93	51.98	3:27.87	+1.78
17	22	United Kingdom	Bradley Hall; Ben Simons	52.02	52.08	51.80	52.00	3:27.90	+1.81
18	9	Russia	Alexander Kasjanov; Ilya Malykh	51.95	52.09	51.92	52.16	3:28.12	+2.03
19	8	United States	Steven Holcomb; Carlo Valdes	52.03	51.97	52.06	52.17	3:28.23	+2.14
20	19	Monaco	Rudy Rinaldi; Boris Vain	51.99	52.15	52.10	52.18	3:28.42	+2.33
21	20	Canada	Nick Poloniato; Joshua Kirkpatrick	52.25	52.07	51.93			
22	18	South Korea	Kim Dong-hyun; Kim Keun-bo	52.16	52.27	52.20			
23	27	France	Loïc Costerg; Vincent Cassel	52.20	52.36	52.21			
24	26	Poland	Mateusz Luty; Grzegorz Kossakowski	52.37	52.50	52.06			
25	24	Russia	Alexey Negodaylo; Kirill Antukh	52.28	52.42	52.24			
26	29	Czech Republic	Dominik Dvořák; Dominik Suchý	52.49	52.44	52.15			
27	31	Austria	Markus Treichl; Franz Esterhammer	52.44	52.61	52.47			
28	32	Serbia	Vuk Rađenović; Aleksandar Krajišnik	52.44	52.65	52.44			
29	30	Brazil	Edson Bindilatti; Edson Martins	52.65	52.86	52.60			
30	21	Netherlands	Ivo de Bruin; Igor Brink	52.80	52.84	52.58			
31	33	Romania	Dorin Grigore; Florin Craciun	52.89	52.94	52.77			
32	34	Croatia	Dražen Silić; Benedikt Nikpalj	53.07	53.08	52.97			
—	28	Czech Republic	Jan Vrba; Jakub Nosek	52.37	52.73	DNS			
—	17	Italy	Simone Bertazzo; Federico Comel	52.53	DNS				
