= Bobsleigh at the 2018 Winter Olympics – Two-man =

Two-man at the XXIII Olympic Winter Games
- Venue: Alpensia Sliding Centre near Pyeongchang, South Korea
- Dates: 18–19 February 2018
- Competitors: 60 from 18 nations
- Winning time: 3:16.86

Medalists
1st place, gold medalist(s)		Justin Kripps; Alexander Kopacz	Canada
1st place, gold medalist(s)		Francesco Friedrich; Thorsten Margis	Germany
3rd place, bronze medalist(s)		Oskars Melbārdis; Jānis Strenga	Latvia

The two-man bobsleigh competition at the 2018 Winter Olympics was held on 18 and 19 February at the Alpensia Sliding Centre near Pyeongchang, South Korea. Justin Kripps and Alexander Kopacz of Canada and Francesco Friedrich and Thorsten Margis of Germany shared gold after the two teams recorded exactly the same time after four runs. Oskars Melbārdis and Jānis Strenga of Latvia won the bronze medal.

== Qualification ==
The top three countries in the 2017–18 Bobsleigh season (including the World Cup, Europe races and Americas Cup) were awarded the maximum three sleds. The next six countries were awarded two sleds each. The remaining nine sleds were awarded to nine countries, with South Korea being awarded a slot as host nation.

== Results ==
The first two runs were held on 18 February and the last two runs were held on 19 February.

Rank	Bib	Country	Athletes	Run 1	Run 2	Run 3	Run 4	Total	Behind
1st place, gold medalist(s)	6	Canada	Justin Kripps; Alexander Kopacz	49.10	49.39	49.09	49.28	3:16.86	–
1st place, gold medalist(s)	7	Germany	Francesco Friedrich; Thorsten Margis	49.22	49.46	48.96 TR	49.22	3:16.86	–
3rd place, bronze medalist(s)	13	Latvia	Oskars Melbārdis; Jānis Strenga	49.08 TR	49.54	49.08	49.21	3:16.91	+0.05
4	11	Germany	Nico Walther; Christian Poser	49.12	49.27	49.32	49.35	3:17.06	+0.20
5	10	Germany	Johannes Lochner; Christopher Weber	49.24	49.34	49.09	49.47	3:17.14	+0.28
6	30	South Korea	Won Yun-jong; Seo Young-woo	49.50	49.39	49.15	49.36	3:17.40	+0.54
7	14	Canada	Nick Poloniato; Jesse Lumsden	49.48	49.48	49.33	49.45	3:17.74	+0.88
8	15	Austria	Benjamin Maier; Markus Sammer	49.41	49.47	49.32	49.56	3:17.76	+0.90
9	9	Latvia	Oskars Ķibermanis; Matīss Miknis	49.21	49.57	49.32	49.70	3:17.80	+0.94
10	8	Canada	Christopher Spring; Lascelles Brown	49.38	49.58	49.56	49.72	3:18.24	+1.38
11	12	Switzerland	Rico Peter; Simon Friedli	49.72	49.53	49.52	49.49	3:18.26	+1.40
12	2	Great Britain	Brad Hall; Joel Fearon	49.37	49.50	49.67	49.80	3:18.34	+1.48
13	23	France	Romain Heinrich; Dorian Hauterville	49.74	49.73	49.55	49.46	3:18.48	+1.62
14	19	United States	Justin Olsen; Evan Weinstock	49.66	49.55	49.53	49.80	3:18.54	+1.68
15	24	Austria	Markus Treichl; Kilian Walch	49.67	49.67	49.56	49.66	3:18.56	+1.70
16	17	Switzerland	Clemens Bracher; Michael Kuonen	49.73	49.90	49.64	49.56	3:18.83	+1.97
17	21	Czech Republic	Dominik Dvořák; Jakub Nosek	49.70	49.63	49.67	49.86	3:18.86	+2.00
18	26	Romania	Mihai Cristian Tentea; Nicolae Ciprian Daroczi	49.69	49.72	49.93	49.64	3:18.98	+2.12
19	25	Monaco	Rudy Rinaldi; Boris Vain	49.85	49.69	49.68	49.80	3:19.02	+2.16
20	18	Olympic Athletes from Russia	Alexey Stulnev; Vasiliy Kondratenko	49.77	49.99	49.74	49.87	3:19.37	+2.51
21	16	United States	Nick Cunningham; Hakeem Abdul-Saboor	49.96	50.11	49.62	—N/a	2:29.69	—N/a
22	3	Australia	Lucas Mata; David Mari	49.88	50.04	49.87	—N/a	2:29.79	—N/a
23	29	Czech Republic	Jan Vrba; Jakub Havlín	49.93	50.07	49.86	—N/a	2:29.86	—N/a
24	22	Poland	Mateusz Luty; Krzysztof Tylkowski	49.87	50.10	49.92	—N/a	2:29.89	—N/a
25	20	United States	Codie Bascue; Sam McGuffie	50.03	50.16	49.90	—N/a	2:30.09	—N/a
26	27	China	Li Chunjian; Wang Sidong	50.13	50.21	50.15	—N/a	2:30.49	—N/a
27	1	Brazil	Edson Bindilatti; Edson Ricardo Martins	50.14	50.22	50.35	—N/a	2:30.71	—N/a
28	5	Olympic Athletes from Russia	Maxim Andrianov; Yury Selikhov (Run 1-2); Ruslan Samitov (Run 3)	50.27	50.58	49.98	—N/a	2:30.83	—N/a
29	28	China	Jin Jian; Shi Hao	50.47	50.17	50.33	—N/a	2:30.97	—N/a
30	4	Croatia	Dražen Silić; Benedikt Nikpalj	50.76	50.91	50.99	—N/a	2:32.66	—N/a
