= Australia at the 2018 Winter Olympics =

- Flag of Australia
- IOC code: AUS
- NOC: Australian Olympic Committee
- Website: www.olympics.com.au

in in Pyeongchang, South Korea 9–25 February 2018
- Competitors: 50 (28 men and 22 women) in 10 sports
- Flag bearers: Scotty James (Opening); Jarryd Hughes (Closing)
- Medals Ranked 23rd: Gold 0 Silver 2 Bronze 1 Total 3

Winter Olympics appearances (overview)
- 1936; 1948; 1952; 1956; 1960; 1964; 1968; 1972; 1976; 1980; 1984; 1988; 1992; 1994; 1998; 2002; 2006; 2010; 2014; 2018; 2022; 2026

Australia competed at the 2018 Winter Olympics in Pyeongchang, South Korea, from 9 to 25 February 2018, with 50 competitors in 10 sports. They won three medals in total, two silver and one bronze, ranking 23rd in the medal table.

== Medalists ==
Medal	Name	Sport	Event	Date
Silver	Matt Graham	Freestyle skiing	Men's moguls	12 February
Silver	Jarryd Hughes	Snowboarding	Men's snowboard cross	15 February
Bronze	Scott James	Snowboarding	Men's half pipe	14 February

== Competitors ==
The following is the list of number of competitors participating at the Games per sport/discipline. A team of 45 athletes (including Russell Henshaw and Belle Brockhoff, subject to medical clearance) was announced by the Australian Olympic Committee on 25 January 2018. A further five athletes were added on 26 January 2018 after the reallocation of quota spots was finalised. Rohan Chapman-Davies was added to the team on 29 January after Russia handed back their men's quota place in mogul skiing.

Sport	Men	Women	Total
Alpine skiing	2	1	3
Bobsleigh	4	0	4
Cross-country skiing	3	3	6
Figure skating	2	2	4
Freestyle skiing	6	10	16
Luge	1	0	1
Short track speed skating	1	1	2
Skeleton	1	1	2
Snowboarding	7	4	11
Speed skating	1	0	1
Total	28	22	50

== Alpine skiing ==
Athlete	Event	Run 1		Run 2		Total	
Athlete	Event	Time	Rank	Time	Rank	Time	Rank
Dominic Demschar	Men's giant slalom	1:13.21	37	1:13.54	33	2:26.75	33
Dominic Demschar	Men's slalom	DNF					
Harry Laidlaw	Men's giant slalom	DSQ					
Greta Small	Women's combined	DNF					
Greta Small	Women's downhill	—N/a				1:42.07	20
Greta Small	Women's super-G	—N/a				1:24.09	31

== Bobsleigh ==
Athlete	Event	Run 1		Run 2		Run 3		Run 4		Total	
Athlete	Event	Time	Rank	Time	Rank	Time	Rank	Time	Rank	Time	Rank
Lucas Mata * David Mari	Two-man	49.88	22	50.04	21	49.87	22	Eliminated		2:29.79	22
Lucas Mata * David Mari; Lachlan Reidy; Hayden Smith	Four-man	49.72	22	49.91	23	50.07	27	Eliminated		2:29.70	25

* – Denotes the driver of each sled

== Cross-country skiing ==
Distance

Athlete	Event	Classical		Freestyle		Final		
Athlete	Event	Time	Rank	Time	Rank	Time	Deficit	Rank
Phillip Bellingham	Men's 15 km freestyle	—N/a				38:36.2	+4:52.3	77
Phillip Bellingham	Men's 50 km classical	—N/a				2:30:39.7	+22:17.6	56
Callum Watson	Men's 15 km freestyle	—N/a				37:53.9	+4:10.0	70
Callum Watson	Men's 30 km skiathlon	44:47.7	62	39:56.0	58	1:25:15.4	+8:55.4	58
Callum Watson	Men's 50 km classical	—N/a				2:33:28.6	+25:06.5	58
Barbara Jezeršek	Women's 10 km freestyle	—N/a				27:42.5	+2:42.0	33
Barbara Jezeršek	Women's 15 km skiathlon	23:34.0	43	20:33.6	28	44:39.3	+3:54.4	39
Aimee Watson	Women's 10 km freestyle	—N/a				29:41.4	+4:40.9	68
Jessica Yeaton	Women's 10 km freestyle	—N/a				28:09.6	+3:09.1	41
Jessica Yeaton	Women's 15 km skiathlon	23:45.2	50	21:20.1	47	45:44.8	+4:59.9	50
Jessica Yeaton	Women's 30 km classical	—N/a				1:40.54.8	+18.37.2	42

Sprint

Athlete	Event	Qualification		Quarterfinal		Semifinal		Final	
Athlete	Event	Time	Rank	Time	Rank	Time	Rank	Time	Rank
Phillip Bellingham	Men's sprint	3:31.54	65	Did not advance					
Phillip Bellingham; Callum Watson	Men's team sprint	—N/a				17:38.36	24	Did not advance	
Aimee Watson	Women's sprint	3:44.87	58	Did not advance					
Casey Wright	Women's sprint	3:49.80	63	Did not advance					
Jessica Yeaton	Women's sprint	3:33.01	48	Did not advance					
Barbara Jezeršek; Jessica Yeaton	Women's team sprint	—N/a				17:20.38	14	Did not advance	

== Figure skating ==
Australia qualified one male figure skater, based on its placement at the 2017 World Figure Skating Championships in Helsinki, Finland. They additionally qualified one female skater as well as an entry in pairs skating through the 2017 CS Nebelhorn Trophy.

Athlete	Event	SP/OD		FS/FD		Total	
Athlete	Event	Points	Rank	Points	Rank	Points	Rank
Brendan Kerry	Men's singles	83.06	16 Q	150.75	21	233.81	20
Kailani Craine	Ladies' singles	56.77	16 Q	111.84	16	168.61	17
Katia Alexandrovskaya / Harley Windsor	Pairs	61.55	18	Did not advance			

== Freestyle skiing ==
Aerials

Athlete	Event	Qualification				Final					
Athlete	Event	Jump 1		Jump 2		Jump 1		Jump 2		Jump 3	
Athlete	Event	Points	Rank	Points	Rank	Points	Rank	Points	Rank	Points	Rank
David Morris	Men's aerials	112.83	15	124.89	2 Q	111.95	10	Did not advance			
Lydia Lassila	Women's aerials	66.27	18	63.45	14	Did not advance					
Laura Peel	Women's aerials	64.86	19	89.46	3 Q	85.05	9 Q	85.65	3 Q	55.34	5
Danielle Scott	Women's aerials	93.76	5 QF	Bye		57.01	12	Did not advance			
Samantha Wells	Women's aerials	54.28	22	58.27	17	Did not advance					

Moguls

Athlete	Event	Qualification						Final								
Athlete	Event	Run 1			Run 2			Run 1			Run 2			Run 3		
Athlete	Event	Time	Total	Rank	Time	Total	Rank	Time	Total	Rank	Time	Total	Rank	Time	Total	Rank
Rohan Chapman-Davies	Men's moguls	26.07	73.96	17	27.52	67.94	12	Did not advance								
Matt Graham	Men's moguls	24.47	77.28	9 Q	Bye			24.89	81.39	2 Q	25.18	80.01	4 Q	24.85	82.57	2nd place, silver medalist(s)
Brodie Summers	Men's moguls	DNS			DNS			did not advance								
James Matheson	Men's moguls	26.33	72.27	23	27.44	74.61	10 Q	26.33	75.98	14	Did not advance					
Madii Himbury	Women's moguls	31.45	69.49	15	31.44	69.36	10 Q	31.03	68.19	20	Did not advance					
Jakara Anthony	Women's moguls	30.52	69.49	14	31.69	73.35	3 Q	30.46	76.81	4 Q	30.48	76.45	5 Q	30.94	75.35	4
Britteny Cox	Women's moguls	28.94	76.78	7 Q	Bye			29.19	75.79	5 Q	28.99	78.28	2 Q	28.29	75.08	5
Claudia Gueli	Women's moguls	31.17	68.68	17	38.35	35.19	13	Did not advance								

Ski cross

Athlete	Event	Seeding		Round of 16	Quarterfinal	Semifinal	Final	
Athlete	Event	Time	Rank	Position	Position	Position	Position	Rank
Anton Grimus	Men's ski cross	1:40.80	30	4	Did not advance			
Sami Kennedy-Sim	Women's ski cross	1:14.97	9	2 Q	1 Q	3 FB	4	8

Slopestyle

Athlete	Event	Qualification				Final				
Athlete	Event	Run 1	Run 2	Best	Rank	Run 1	Run 2	Run 3	Best	Rank
Russ Henshaw	Men's slopestyle	72.60	64.00	72.60	19	Did not advance				

== Luge ==
Based on the results from the World Cups during the 2017–18 Luge World Cup season, Australia qualified 1 sled.

Athlete	Event	Run 1		Run 2		Run 3		Run 4		Total	
Athlete	Event	Time	Rank	Time	Rank	Time	Rank	Time	Rank	Time	Rank
Alexander Ferlazzo	Men's singles	48.073	16	48.587	27	49.351	36	Eliminated		2:26.011	28

== Short track speed skating ==
Athlete	Event	Heat		Quarterfinal		Semifinal		Final	
Athlete	Event	Time	Rank	Time	Rank	Time	Rank	Time	Rank
Andy Jung	Men's 500 m	1:03.137	3	Did not advance					
Andy Jung	Men's 1500 m	2:16.995	4 Q	—N/a		2:11.183	5	Did not advance	
Deanna Lockett	Women's 1000 m	PEN		Did not advance					
Deanna Lockett	Women's 1500 m	2:28.996	2 Q	—N/a		3:01.928	6	Did not advance	

== Skeleton ==
Australia the qualified a male and female athlete in the skeleton discipline. John Farrow, who had previously represented Australia in the 2014 Olympic Games, retired after competing in the 2018 Olympics.

Athlete	Event	Run 1		Run 2		Run 3		Run 4		Total	
Athlete	Event	Time	Rank	Time	Rank	Time	Rank	Time	Rank	Time	Rank
John Farrow	Men's	51.64	21	51.31	18	51.40	20	51.53	16	3:25.88	19
Jaclyn Narracott	Women's	52.53	15	52.76	16	52.62	17	52.82	17	3:30.73	16

== Snowboarding ==
Freestyle

Athlete	Event	Qualification				Final				
Athlete	Event	Run 1	Run 2	Best	Rank	Run 1	Run 2	Run 3	Best	Rank
Kent Callister	Men's halfpipe	66.75	77.00	77.00	12 Q	20.00	62.00	56.75	62.00	10
Scott James	Men's halfpipe	89.00	96.75	96.75	2 Q	92.00	81.75	40.25	92.00	3rd place, bronze medalist(s)
Nathan Johnstone	Men's halfpipe	62.25	10.25	62.25	22	Did not advance				
Emily Arthur	Women's halfpipe	30.25	66.50	66.50	8 Q	48.25	9.25	25.00	48.25	11
Holly Crawford	Women's halfpipe	57.50	20.00	57.50	13	Did not advance				
Jessica Rich	Women's big air	73.50	74.25	74.25	13	Did not advance				

Tess Coady selected in team but did not compete due to injury in training prior to the competition.

Snowboard cross

Athlete	Event	Seeding						1/8 final	Quarterfinal	Semifinal	Final	
Athlete	Event	Run 1		Run 2		Best	Seed	1/8 final	Quarterfinal	Semifinal	Final	
Athlete	Event	Time	Rank	Time	Rank	Best	Seed	Position	Position	Position	Position	Rank
Cam Bolton	Men's snowboard cross	1:14.35	12	Bye		1:14.35	12	2 Q	3 Q	4 FB	4	10
Jarryd Hughes	Men's snowboard cross	1:15.69	28	1:13.73	1	1:13.73	25	1 Q	2 Q	2 FA	2	2nd place, silver medalist(s)
Adam Lambert	Men's snowboard cross	1:14.94	22	Bye		1:14.94	22	4	Did not advance			
Alex Pullin	Men's snowboard cross	1:14.76	20	Bye		1:14.76	20	2 Q	2 Q	1 FA	6	6
Belle Brockhoff	Women's snowboard cross	1:20.34	10	Bye		1:20.34	10	—N/a	3 Q	DNF FB	5	11

== Speed skating ==
Athlete	Event	Final	
Athlete	Event	Time	Rank
Daniel Greig	Men's 500 m	35.22	21
Daniel Greig	Men's 1000 m	1:09.99	22

== See also ==
- Australia at the 2017 Asian Winter Games
- Australia at the 2018 Commonwealth Games
- Australia at the 2018 Winter Paralympics
