= Markus Glueck =

Austrian bobsledder

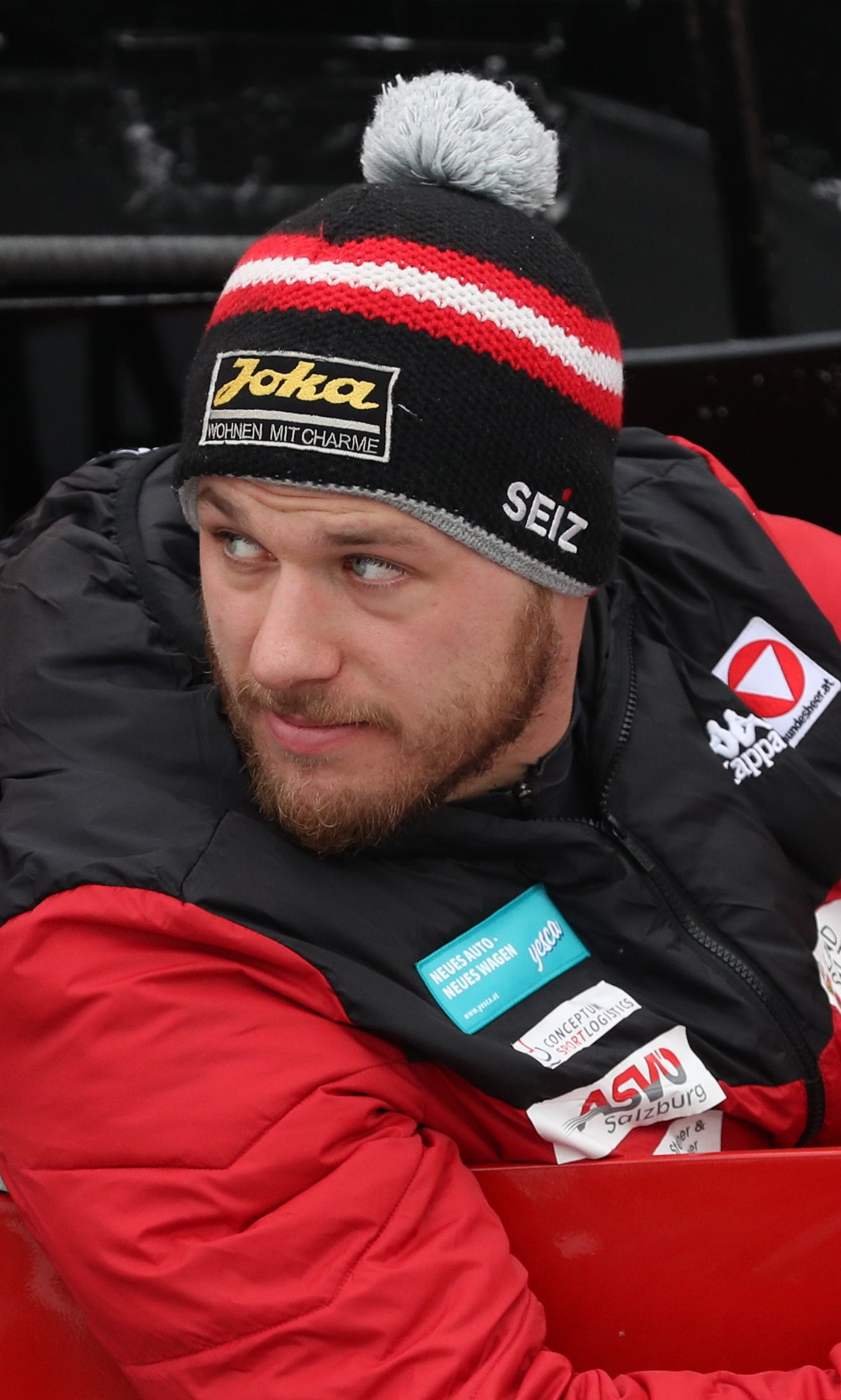
- Glueck in 2019

Personal information
- Nationality: Austrian
- Born: 15 February 1990 (age 35); Vöcklabruck, Austria

Sport
- Sport: Bobsleigh

Markus Glueck (born 15 February 1990) is an Austrian bobsledder. He competed in the four-man event at the 2018 Winter Olympics.
