= Martin Meier =

Swiss bobsledder (born 1984)

Personal information
- Nationality: Swiss
- Born: 27 April 1984 (age 40)

Sport
- Sport: Bobsleigh

Martin Meier (born 27 April 1984) is a Swiss bobsledder. He competed in the four-man event at the 2018 Winter Olympics.
