= Arnold Zdebiak =

Polish bobsledder

Personal information
- Nationality: Polish
- Born: 11 May 1993 (age 32) Żary, Poland

Sport
- Sport: Bobsleigh

Arnold Zdebiak (born 11 May 1993) is a Polish bobsledder. He competed in the four-man event at the 2018 Winter Olympics.
