= Bror van der Zijde =

Dutch bobsledder

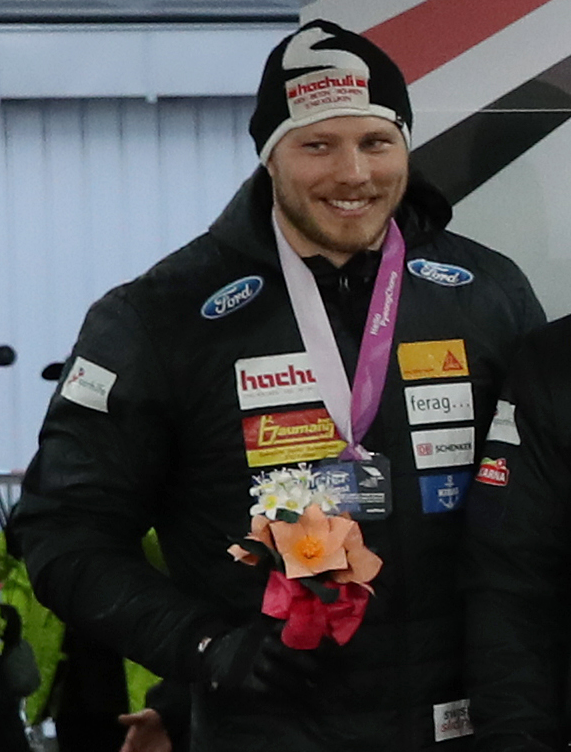

Personal information
- Nationality: Dutch / Swiss
- Born: 13 February 1989 (age 37) Gouda, Netherlands
- Height: 1.89 m (6 ft 2 in)
- Weight: 110 kg (243 lb)

Sport
- Country: Netherlands / Switzerland
- Sport: Bobsleigh (brakeman)
Medal record
World Championships
Bronze medal – third place	2016 Igls	Four-man

Bror van der Zijde (born 13 February 1989) is a Dutch bobsledder.

== Career ==
Van der Zijde competed at the 2014 Winter Olympics for the Netherlands. He teamed with driver Edwin van Calker in the two-man event, finishing 19th, and with van Calker, Sybren Jansma and Arno Klaassen in the four-man event, finishing 11th.

Van der Zijde made his World Cup debut in November 2012. As of April 2014, his best World Cup finish is 7th, in a four-man event in 2013-14 at Konigssee.

He joined the Swiss national bobsleigh team as a brakeman for Rico Peter ahead of the 2014-15 season.
