= Alain Knuser =

Swiss bobsledder (born 1994)

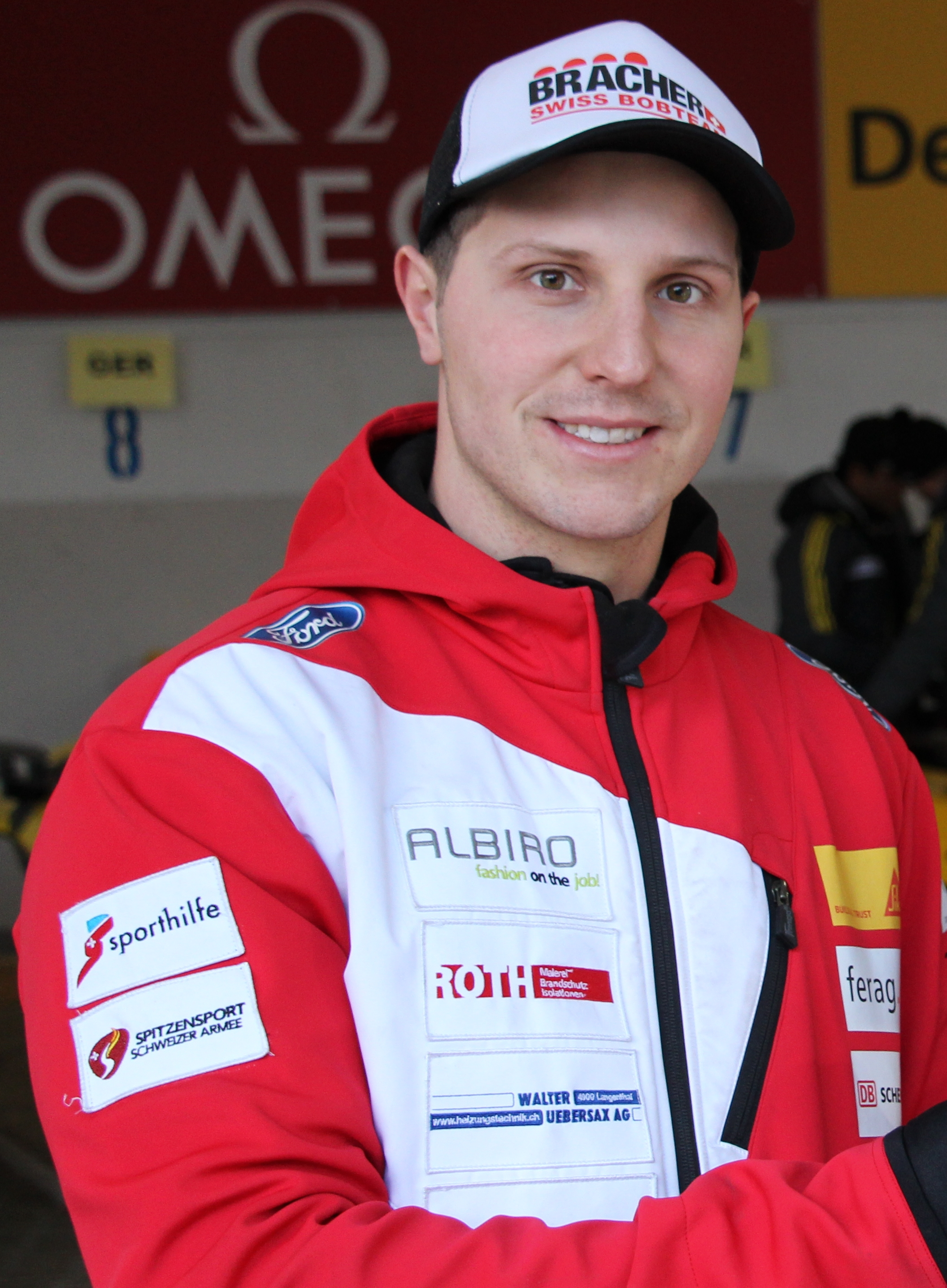
- Alain Knuser in 2016

Personal information
- Nationality: Swiss
- Born: 7 December 1994 (age 31)

Sport
- Sport: Bobsleigh
Medal record
Men's bobsleigh
Representing Switzerland
European Championships
Bronze medal – third place	2023 Altenberg	Four-man

Alain Knuser (born 7 December 1994) is a Swiss bobsledder. He competed in the four-man event at the 2018 Winter Olympics.
