= Jaroslav Kopřiva =

Czech bobsledder (born 1990)

Personal information
- Nationality: Czech
- Born: 23 October 1990 (age 35) Mladá Boleslav, Czechoslovakia

Sport
- Sport: Bobsleigh

Jaroslav Kopřiva (born 23 October 1990) is a Czech bobsledder.

== Biography ==
Jaroslav Kopřiva was born on 23 October 1990 in Mladá Boleslav. Before he started bobsled, Kopřiva was a track and field athlete. He has a university degree.

== Career ==
Kopřiva started to bobsleigh in 2011. He competed for the clubs Bob klub Slavia Prague and PSK Olymp Prague. Kopřiva's best results are in four-man bobsleigh competition. He first sought to participate in the 2014 Olympic Games in Sochi, but only one Czech four-man sled could qualify, so his sled could not start. Kopřiva then competed in the four-man event at the 2018 Winter Olympics in Pyeongchang, where his team finished in 21st place.

In the 2018–19 season, the Czech team with Jaroslav Kopřiva finished on 7th place in a Bobsleigh World Cup event, which is the best result in the history of the country in a four-man World Cup event.

As of 2024, he is the chairman of the bobsleigh club PSK Olymp Prague.
