= David Mari =

Australian bobsledder

Personal information
- Nationality: Australian
- Born: 25 April 1995 (age 29)

Sport
- Sport: Bobsleigh

David Mari (born 25 April 1995) is an Australian bobsledder. He competed in the Two-man and Four-man events at the 2018 Winter Olympics.
