= Hayden Smith (bobsleigh) =

Australian bobsledder

Personal information
- Nationality: Australian
- Born: 28 March 1992 (age 32)

Sport
- Sport: Bobsleigh

Hayden Smith (born 28 March 1992) is an Australian bobsledder. He competed in the four-man event at the 2018 Winter Olympics.
