= Łukasz Miedzik =

Polish bobsledder

Personal information
- Nationality: Polish
- Born: 2 April 1991 (age 33); Bydgoszcz, Poland

Sport
- Sport: Bobsleigh

Łukasz Miedzik (born 2 April 1991) is a Polish bobsledder. He competed in the four-man event at the 2018 Winter Olympics.
