= Jesse Lumsden =

Canadian football player and bobsledder (born 1982)

Personal information
- Nationality: Canadian
- Born: August 3, 1982 (age 44) Edmonton, Alberta, Canada
- Height: 1.86 m (6 ft 1 in)
- Weight: 101 kg (223 lb)

Sport
- Country: Canada
- Sport: Bobsleigh
Medal record
World Championships
Gold medal – first place	2012 Lake Placid	Two man
Silver medal – second place	2017 Königssee	Two-man

Jesse Lumsden
Profile
- Position: Running back

Personal information
- Listed height: 6 ft 0 in (1.83 m)
- Listed weight: 216 lb (98 kg)

Career information
- High school: Trinity; Nelson
- University: McMaster
- CFL draft: 2005: 1st round, 6th overall pick

Career history
- 2005: Seattle Seahawks*
- 2005–2008: Hamilton Tiger-Cats
- 2009: Edmonton Eskimos
- 2010: Calgary Stampeders
- * Offseason or practice squad member only

Awards and highlights
- CFL East All-Star (2007); Lois and Doug Mitchell Award (2005); Hec Crighton Trophy (2004)
- Stats at CFL.ca (archive)

Jesse Lumsden (born August 3, 1982) is a Canadian Olympic and world champion bobsledder and a former Canadian football player, who played for the Hamilton Tiger-Cats, Edmonton Eskimos and Calgary Stampeders.

== Career ==
=== Football ===
Lumsden is the son of former CFL fullback Neil Lumsden. Jesse attended Trinity College School in Port Hope, Ontario and Nelson High School in Burlington, Ontario (where he led them to the Metro Bowl Title), and McMaster University in Hamilton, Ontario, and graduated with a Bachelor of Arts degree in geography. Lumsden had a standout career with the McMaster Marauders, where he won the Hec Crighton Trophy in 2004 and was invited to the East-West Shrine Game. Lumsden continues to hold several Marauders records, including most touchdowns in a season and for a career.

Lumsden was signed as an undrafted free agent by the Seattle Seahawks in 2005, but was released shortly thereafter. Following his release, he had a short tenure with the Hamilton Tiger-Cats. In January 2006, he was signed to play for the Washington Redskins and was later released only to play with the Tiger-Cats once again. In 2009, Lumsden signed with the Edmonton Eskimos, but he sustained a season-ending shoulder injury in their opening game. On May 5, 2010, Lumsden was released by the Eskimos. He signed with the Calgary Stampeders on a practice roster agreement midway through the 2010 season, and was activated in October.

Lumsden was timed consistently around 4.4 seconds in the 40-yard dash during his playing career.

=== Bobsled ===
Lumsden took part in the Vancouver 2010 Winter Olympics as a member of Pierre Lueders' bobsleigh team; he was the brakeman in the two-man sled that won the Canadian National Bobsleigh championships at the Whistler Sliding Centre, March 21, 2009. It was expected that he participated in both the two-man and four-man teams in the 2009–10 world competitions leading up to the 2010 Winter Olympics. On January 27, 2010 Lumsden was named to the 2010 Canadian Olympic bobsleigh team where he and driver Pierre Lueders finished fifth both in the two-man and in the four-man bobsleigh events. During the Olympics, he and his four-man bobsled team flipped over during a false turn. Justin Kripps and the others walked out of the accident untouched.

Lumsden partnered with Lyndon Rush for the 2011-12 2011–12 Bobsleigh World Cup season. They won their first World Cup event in the two-man event on home soil in Whistler, British Columbia in February 2012. It was the first gold medal of Lumsden's career and his second medal overall. They finished 4th in the World Cup standings that season, and concluded it with a silver medal at the world championships in Lake Placid, New York.

In the 2012–13 Bobsleigh World Cup season, Lumsden and Rush were on the podium three times, including two wins. They were 3rd at Winterberg, Germany, and then won twice. Their first victory of the season was in La Plagne, France, and the second was at Königssee, Germany. Those results helped Lumsden and Rush win the 2 man overall 2012–13 Bobsleigh World Cup title.

Lumsden qualified for the 2014 Sochi Winter Olympics as a member of the Canada 1 four-man bobsled team, and a member of the Canada 2, two-man bobsled. Lumsden finished 7th overall in the 2-man Bobsled competition, finishing 1.4 seconds behind the leader through 4 heats.

Lumsden competed in both the two-man event - with Nick Poloniato - and four-man event - under driver Justin Kripps - at the 2018 Winter Olympics, his third games, finishing 7th in the two-man event and 6th in the four-man event.

== Administration appointment ==
In June 2024 Lumsden was appointed high performance director of Bobsleigh Canada Skeleton, the national governing body for bobsled and skeleton, after spending four and a half years in the business world with Neo Financial.

== Honors ==
Lumsden was inducted into the Burlington Sports Hall of Fame in 2014. He was put into the McMaster University Athletics Hall of Fame in 2018.
