= Thorsten Margis =

German bobsledder (born 1989)

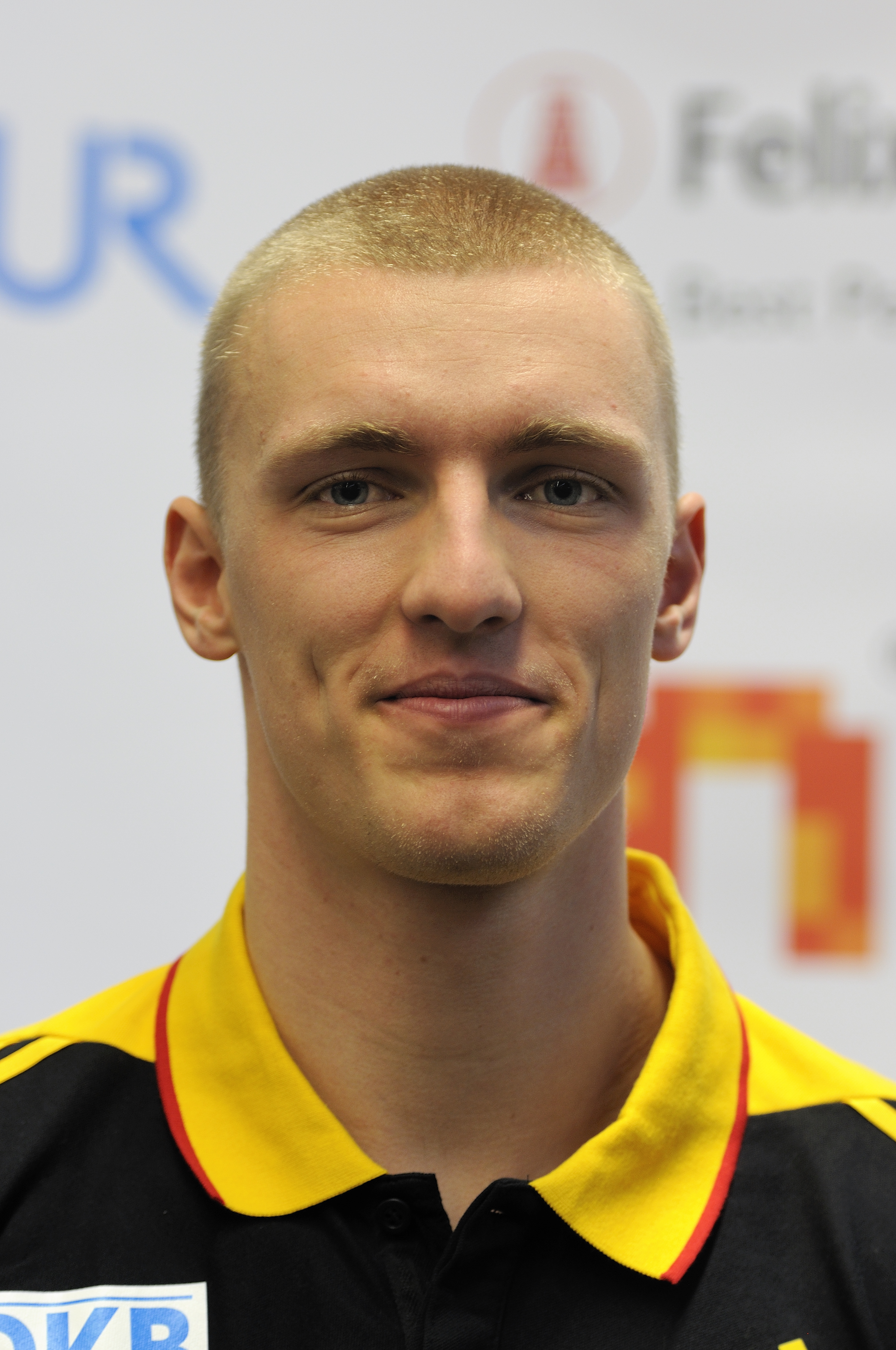
- Thorsten Margis in 2014

Personal information
- Nationality: German
- Born: 14 August 1989 (age 37) Bad Honnef, West Germany
- Height: 1.91 m (6 ft 3 in)
- Weight: 107 kg (236 lb)

Sport
- Country: Germany
- Sport: Bobsleigh
- Events: Two-man, Four-man
- Club: SV Halle
- Turned pro: 2011
Medal record
Men's bobsleigh
Representing Germany
Olympic Games
Gold medal – first place	2018 Pyeongchang	Two-man
Gold medal – first place	2018 Pyeongchang	Four-man
Gold medal – first place	2022 Beijing	Two-man
Gold medal – first place	2022 Beijing	Four-man
Gold medal – first place	2026 Milano Cortina	Four-man
World Championships
Gold medal – first place	2015 Winterberg	Two-man
Gold medal – first place	2016 Igls	Two-man
Gold medal – first place	2017 Königssee	Two-man
Gold medal – first place	2017 Königssee	Four-man
Gold medal – first place	2019 Whistler	Two-man
Gold medal – first place	2019 Whistler	Four-man
Gold medal – first place	2020 Altenberg	Two-man
Gold medal – first place	2021 Altenberg	Four-man
Gold medal – first place	2023 St. Moritz	Four-man
Gold medal – first place	2024 Winterberg	Four-man
Silver medal – second place	2016 Igls	Four-man
European Championships
Gold medal – first place	2017 Winterberg	Two-man
Gold medal – first place	2018 Igls	Two-man
Gold medal – first place	2021 Winterberg	Two-man
Gold medal – first place	2021 Winterberg	Four-man
Gold medal – first place	2022 St. Moritz	Two-man
Silver medal – second place	2015 La Plagne	Four-man
Silver medal – second place	2018 Igls	Four-man
Silver medal – second place	2020 Winterberg	Four-man
Silver medal – second place	2023 Altenberg	Four-man
Silver medal – second place	2026 St. Moritz	Four-man
Bronze medal – third place	2014 Königssee	Four-man

Thorsten Margis (born 14 August 1989) is a German bobsledder.

== Career ==
Margis competed at the 2014 Winter Olympics for Germany. He teamed with driver Francesco Friedrich, Gregor Bermbach and Jannis Bäcker in the Germany-2 sled in the four-man event, finishing 10th.

As of April 2014, his best showing at the World Championships is 4th, in the 2013 team event, with his best finish in an Olympic discipline 13th in the 2013 four-man event.

Margis made his World Cup debut in January 2013. As of April 2014, he has three World Cup podium finishes, with his best result being a pair of silver medals in 2013–14.

Margis and Francesco Friedrich tied with Canada's Justin Kripps and Alexander Kopacz for the gold medal at the 2018 Winter Olympics in Pyeongchang, South Korea.

He earned gold medals at the 2022 Winter Olympics and 2026 Winter Olympics.

== World Cup podiums ==
Date	Location	Rank	Event	Teammates
6 January 2013	Altenberg	3rd place, bronze medalist(s)	Four-man	Thomas Florschütz; Andreas Bredau; Kevin Kuske
4 January 2014	Winterberg	2nd place, silver medalist(s)	Four-man	Francesco Friedrich; Jannis Bäcker; Gregor Bermbach
5 January 2014	Winterberg	2nd place, silver medalist(s)	Four-man	Francesco Friedrich; Jannis Bäcker; Gregor Bermbach
