= Lachlan Reidy =

Australian bobsledder

Personal information
- Nationality: Australian
- Born: 7 July 1987 (age 37)

Sport
- Sport: Bobsleigh

Lachlan Reidy (born 7 July 1987) is an Australian bobsledder. He competed in the four-man event at the 2018 Winter Olympics.
