= Grzegorz Kossakowski =

Polish bobsledder

Personal information
- Nationality: Polish
- Born: 5 February 1991 (age 34) Białystok, Poland

Sport
- Sport: Bobsleigh

Grzegorz Kossakowski (born 5 February 1991) is a Polish bobsledder and sprinter. He competed in the four-man event at the 2018 Winter Olympics.
