= Clemens Bracher =

Swiss bobsledder (born 1987)

Personal information
- Nationality: Swiss
- Born: 25 January 1987 (age 38)

Sport
- Sport: Bobsleigh

Clemens Bracher (born 25 January 1987) is a Swiss bobsledder. He competed in the two-man event at the 2018 Winter Olympics.
