= Vincent Castell =

French bobsledder

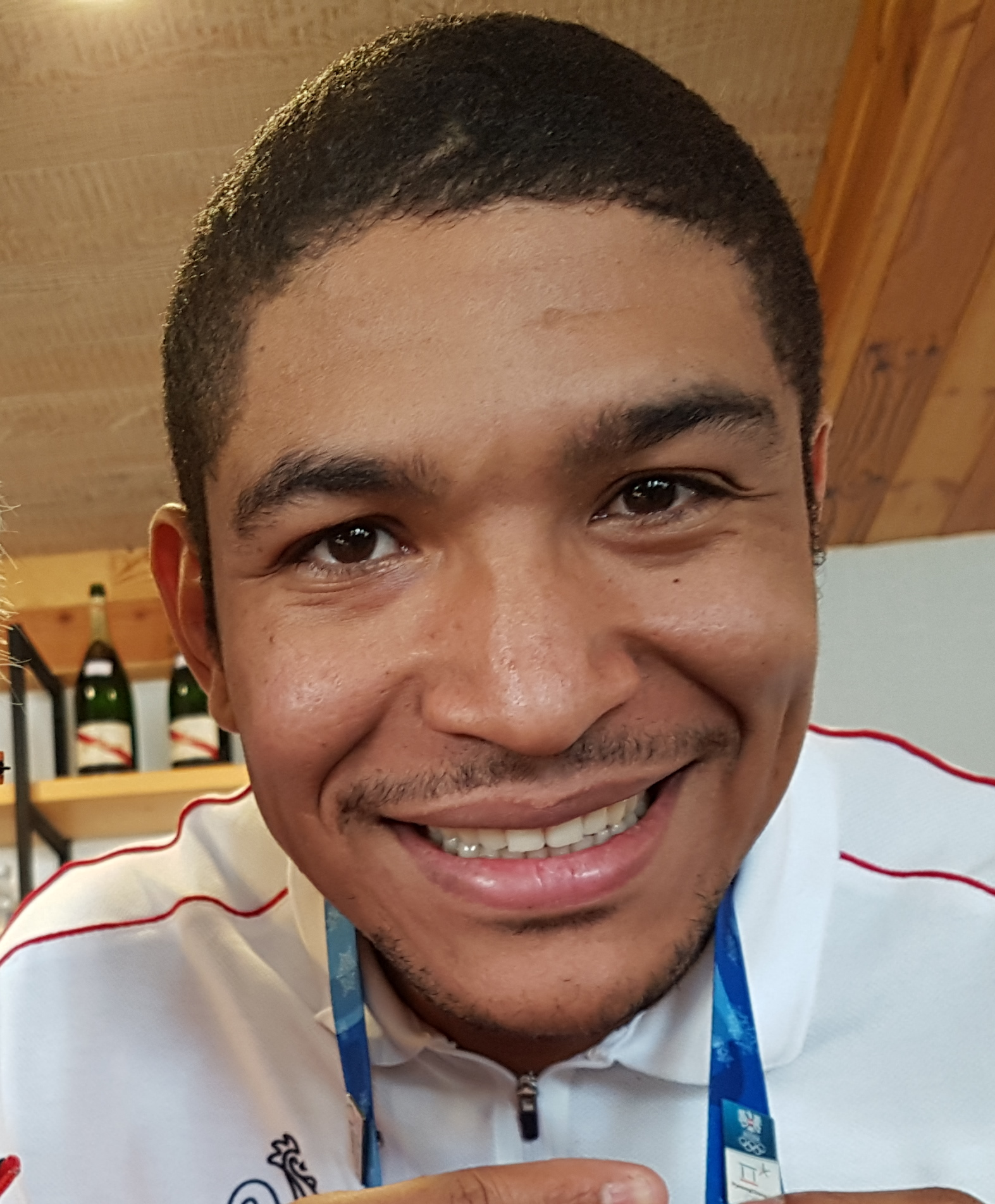
- Vincent Castell in 2018

Personal information
- Nationality: French
- Born: 2 January 1992 (age 33)

Sport
- Sport: Bobsleigh

Vincent Castell (born 2 January 1992) is a French bobsledder. He competed in the four-man event at the 2018 Winter Olympics.
