= Dorin Alexandru Grigore =

Romanian bobsledder

Personal information
- Nationality: Romanian
- Born: 1 August 1985 (age 40)
- Height: 1.82 m (6 ft 0 in)
- Weight: 95 kg (209 lb)

Sport
- Sport: Bobsleigh

Dorin Alexandru Grigore (born 1 August 1985) is a Romanian bobsledder. He competed in the 2018 Winter Olympics.
