= Joshua Kirkpatrick =

Canadian bobsledder

Josh Kirkpatrick
Personal information
- Full name: Joshua Kirkpatrick
- Born: 13 June 1987 (age 38) London, Ontario, Canada
- Height: 180 cm (5 ft 11 in)
- Weight: 102 kg (225 lb)

Sport
- Country: Canada
- Sport: Bobsleigh

Joshua Kirkpatrick (born 13 June 1987) is a Canadian bobsledder. He competed in the four-man event at the 2018 Winter Olympics.
