= Michael Kuonen =

Swiss bobsledder (born 1991)

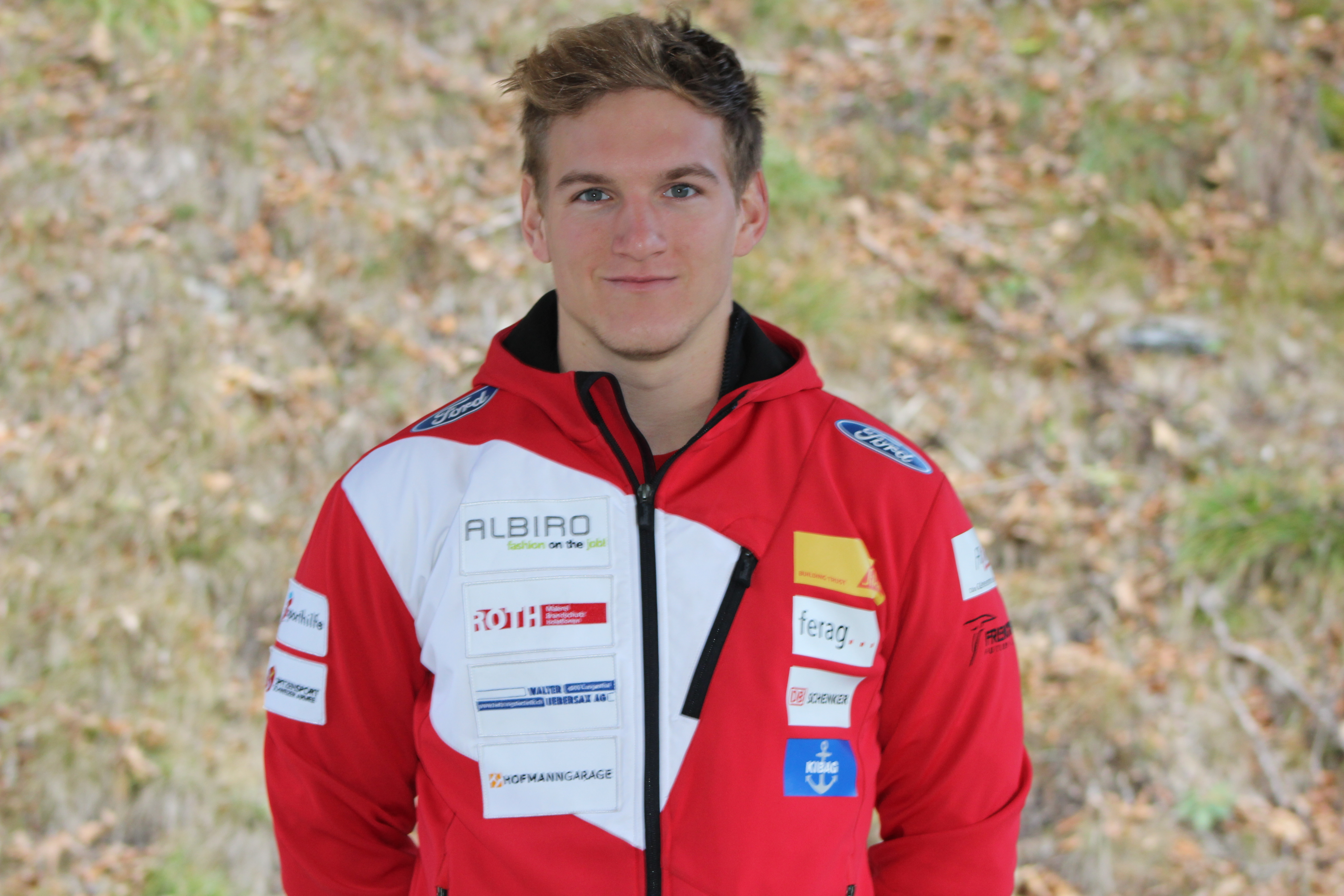
- Michael Kuonen in 2015

Personal information
- Nationality: Swiss
- Born: 10 June 1991 (age 33)

Sport
- Sport: Bobsleigh

Michael Kuonen (born 10 June 1991) is a Swiss bobsledder. He competed in the two-man event at the 2018 Winter Olympics.
