= Mate Mezulić =

Croatian bobsledder (born 1981)

Mate Mezulić (born July 15, 1981, in Pula) is a Croatian bobsledder who has competed since 2008. At the 2010 Winter Olympics, he was part of the Croatian team (Ivan Šola, Slaven Krajačić, Mate Mezulić, Igor Marić) that finished 20th in the four-man event though he was replaced after the second run.

Mezulić's best finish was sixth in a minor league version of the World Cup in the four-man event twice in December 2009.

Mate Mezulić was a member of the Croatian four-man bobsleigh team at the 2018 Winter Olympics in Pyeongchang, South Korea. His team, consisting of driver Dražen Silić, Benedikt Nikpalj, Antonio Zelić, and himself. After the brakeman's injury they finished in 28th place out of 29 teams.
