= Joshua Bluhm =

German bobsledder (born 1994)

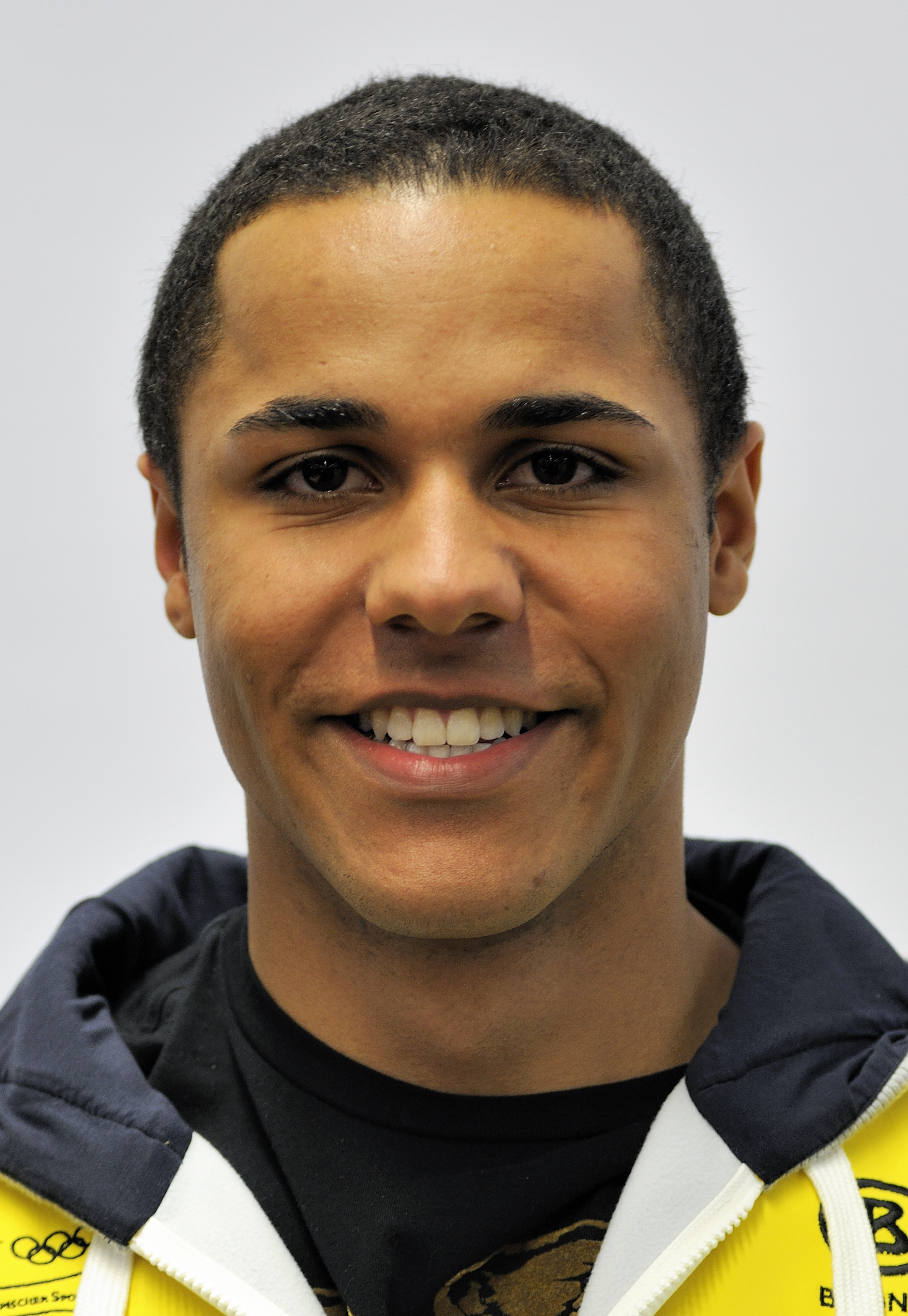
- Bluhm at the Outfitting for the Olympic Games in January 2014 in Erding

Personal information
- Nationality: German
- Born: 11 September 1994 (age 31) Kiel, Germany
- Height: 1.86 m (6 ft 1 in)
- Weight: 95 kg (209 lb)

Sport
- Country: Germany
- Sport: Bobsleigh
- Event: Four-man
- Club: BSC Winterberg
Medal record
World Championships
Gold medal – first place	2017 Königssee	Four-man
Silver medal – second place	2015 Winterberg	Two-man
Silver medal – second place	2016 Igls	Two-man
Bronze medal – third place	2017 Königssee	Two-man
Bronze medal – third place	2020 Altenberg	Four-man

Joshua Bluhm (born 11 September 1994) is a German bobsledder.

Bluhm competed at the 2014 Winter Olympics for Germany. He teamed with driver Thomas Florschütz, Kevin Kuske and Christian Poser as the Germany-3 sled in the four-man event, finishing 7th.

Bluhm made his World Cup debut in January 2014. As of April 2014, he has two World Cup podium finishes, a pair of bronze medals in 2013–14.

== World Cup podiums ==
Date	Location	Rank	Event	Teammates
5 January 2014	Winterberg	3rd place, bronze medalist(s)	Four-man	Thomas Florschütz; Kevin Kuske; Christian Poser
19 January 2014	Igls	3rd place, bronze medalist(s)	Four-man	Thomas Florschütz; Kevin Kuske; Christian Poser
