= David Egydy =

Czech bobsledder (born 1983)

Personal information
- Nationality: Czech
- Born: 16 February 1983 (age 42) Ústí nad Orlicí, Pardubický kraj, Czechoslovakia
- Height: 1.87 m (6 ft 2 in)
- Weight: 100 kg (220 lb)

Sport
- Sport: Bobsleigh

David Egydy (born 16 February 1983) is a Czech bobsledder. He competed in the 2018 Winter Olympics.
