= Jan Stokláska =

Czech bobsledder

Jan Stokláska (born 7 February 1983) is a Czech former track and field sprinter and bobsledder. As a sprinter he won two national titles in 2005, over 100 metres and 60 metres. He began competing in bobsleigh from 2007 onwards. At the 2010 Winter Olympics in Vancouver, he finished 12th in the four-man event and 13th in the two-man event.

Stokláska's best finish at the FIBT World Championships was sixth in the two-man event at Altenberg, Germany in 2008.

== National titles ==
- Czech Athletics Championships
  - 100 m: 2005
- Czech Indoor Athletics Championships
  - 60 m: 2005
