= Justin Kripps =

Canadian bobsledder (born 1987)

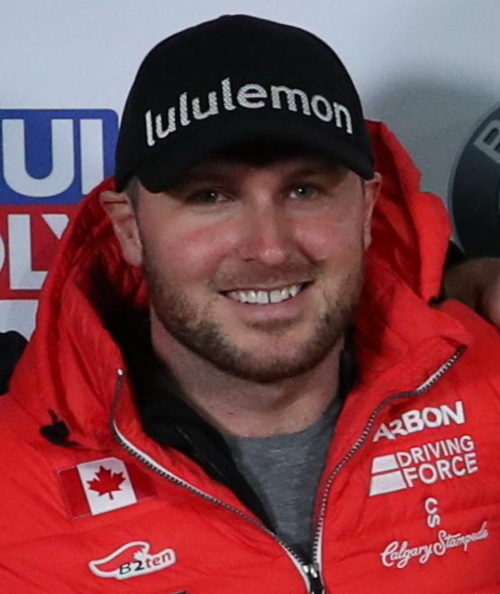
- Kripps in 2019

Personal information
- Nationality: Canadian
- Born: January 6, 1987 (age 39) Naalehu, Hawaii, U.S.
- Height: 1.83 m (6 ft 0 in)
- Weight: 100 kg (220 lb)

Sport
- Country: Canada
- Sport: Bobsleigh
- Event: Two-man
- Turned pro: 2007
- Retired: 2022
Medal record
Olympic Games
Gold medal – first place	2018 Pyeongchang	Two-man
Bronze medal – third place	2022 Beijing	Four-man
World Championships
Silver medal – second place	2017 Königssee	Two-man
Silver medal – second place	2019 Whistler	Two-man
Bronze medal – third place	2012 Lake Placid	Mixed team
Bronze medal – third place	2015 Winterberg	Mixed team
Bronze medal – third place	2019 Whistler	Four-man

Justin Kripps (born January 6, 1987) is a retired Canadian bobsledder and an Olympic champion in two-man bobsleigh following his gold medal win at the 2018 Winter Olympics in Pyeongchang, South Korea. Kripps won a silver medal in the two-man event at the 2017 World Championships and a bronze in the mixed team event at the 2012 World Championships. He has competed in the sport since 2006 and has many World Cup podiums. During the 2017–18 Bobsleigh World Cup, he finished the season first in the two-man and overall, to win the Crystal Globe as overall champion.

== Career ==
Kripps entered the sport of bobsledding in 2006 at the age of 19 when he participated in a testing camp. He had competed in athletics at Simon Fraser University where Kripps led the 4 × 100 m team (Justin Kripps, Neal Hurtubise, Rob Drapala, Brett Robinson) to All-American honors and a school record at the 2005 NAIA Outdoor Track and Field Championships in Louisville, Kentucky (SFU Athletics, 2009 & NAIA 2005). Kripps entered bobsleigh as he saw it as a mix of track and field and race car driving.

During his initial years in Canada, he competed as a brakeman; Kripps won his first Bobsleigh World Cup race in the men's four-man in Cortina d'Ampezzo, Italy, in January 2008 alongside Pierre Lueders, Ken Kotyk and David Bissett. Kripps and Lueders were the first people to slide down the Whistler Sliding Centre in British Columbia in 2007. The two competed again years late in the four-man event at the 2010 Winter Olympics in Vancouver.

=== Starting as a driver ===
Following the 2010 Olympics, Kripps decided he wanted to become a driver and attended pilot school in the summer of 2010. He spent the 2010–11 season on the developmental North American circuit. Kripps competed at the 2011 World Junior Championships, where he placed fifth in the two-man and eighth in the four-man competitions. The next season he competed on the Europa Cup circuit for 2011–12 before starting his first Bobsleigh World Cup event at Whistler in February 2012. His first FIBT World Championships as a pilot took place in 2012 when he participated in the mixed team event and won bronze.

Kripps' first podium as a driver on the World Cup was in 2014 when he won gold at Königssee. While attending the 2014 Winter Olympics, Kripps learned that his website had been restricted from access in Russia. Kripps said in response on his Twitter account, "Looks like my website is censored in Russia, classic #SochiProblems I wonder if there's a camera in my room". In the Olympics, pushed by Bryan Barnett in the Canada-3 sled he was the top Canadian finisher in sixth place. Due to his great result, he was moved to the top sled in the four-man event; eighth after the first run, he overturned in the second run and failed to qualify for the final.

=== World and Olympic success ===
Through the 2016–17 Bobsleigh World Cup season, Kripps found the podium three more times. At the 2017 World Championships, he finished in the silver medal position, pushed by Jesse Lumsden. Pushed together by Lumsden and new push partner Alexander Kopacz he finished the season in the top position in both the two-man and overall standings for the 2017–18 Bobsleigh World Cup season, taking the Crystal Globe in both categories.

At the 2018 Winter Olympics, Kripps and brakeman Kopacz tied with the German team of Francesco Friedrich and Thorsten Margis for the gold medal, Canada's sixth of the games. Leading after three runs, Kripps came around the final corner and finished in exactly the same time as Friedrich. After the race, Kripps said, "I stayed calm throughout the whole thing and focused on my runs. I've been working on my mental game since I started driving, and coincidentally Pierre Lueders taught me how to drive, which is interesting because he tied for a gold medal 20 years ago. It was just an amazing race."

In January 2022, Kripps was named to Canada's 2022 Olympic team. Kripps would go onto win the bronze medal in the Four-man event. On August 25, 2022, Kripps announced his retirement from the sport.
