= Maksim Andrianov =

Russian bobsledder (born 1988)

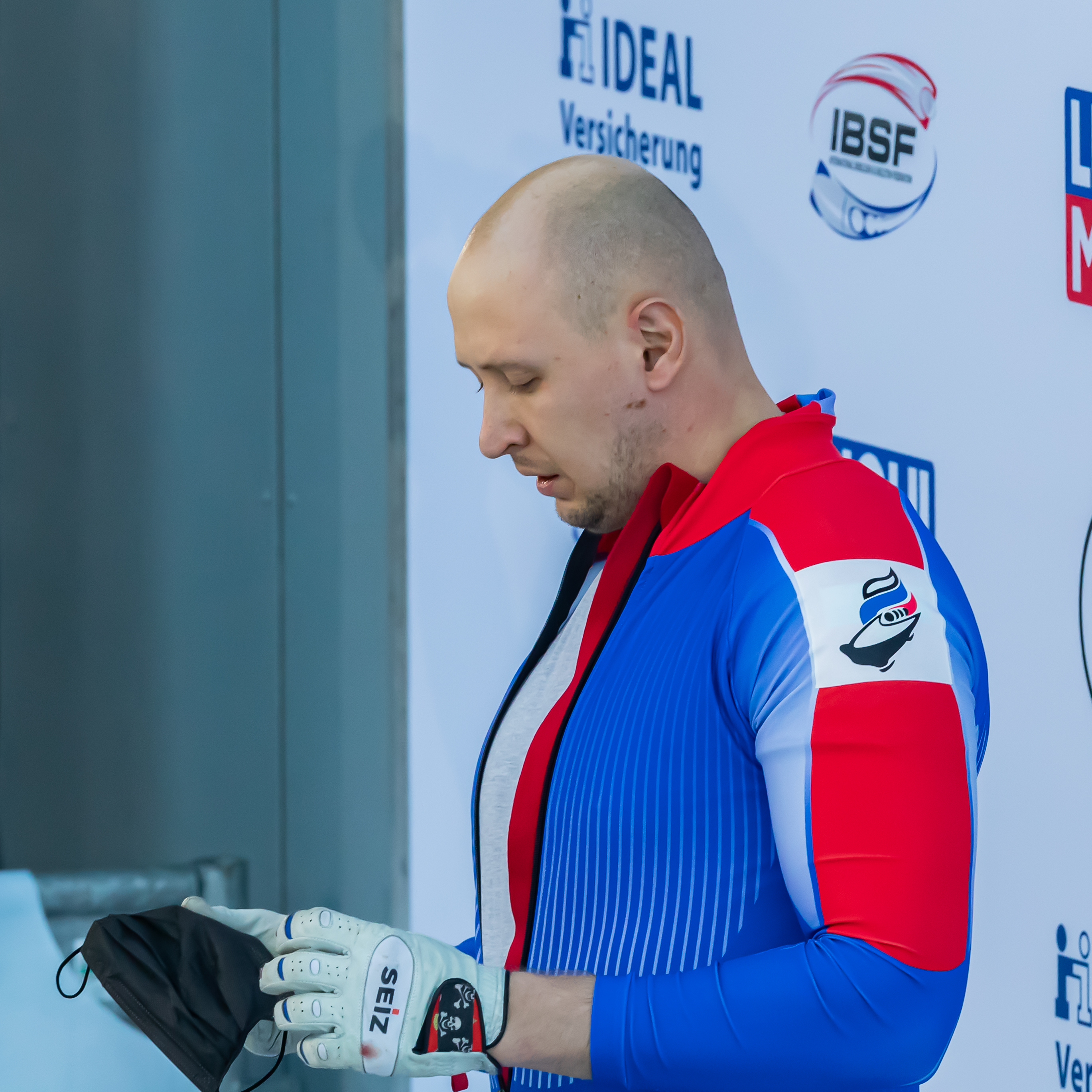
- Andrianov in 2021

Personal information
- Nationality: Russian
- Born: 27 February 1988 (age 37); Krasnoyarsk, Russian SSR, Soviet Union (now Russia)

Sport
- Country: Russia
- Sport: Bobsleigh

Maksim Andrianov (born 27 February 1988) is a Russian bobsledder. He competed in the two-man event at the 2018 Winter Olympics.
