= Simone Fontana =

Italian bobsledder (born 1991)

Personal information
- Born: 7 May 1991 (age 35)
- Height: 1.83 m (6 ft 0 in) (6' 0'')
- Weight: 97 kg / 214 lb
Medal record
Bobsleigh
Representing Italy

Simone Fontana (born 7 May 1991) is a bobsledder from Italy. He competed for Italy at the 2014 Winter Olympics in the two bobsleigh events.
