= Vasiliy Kondratenko =

Russian bobsledder

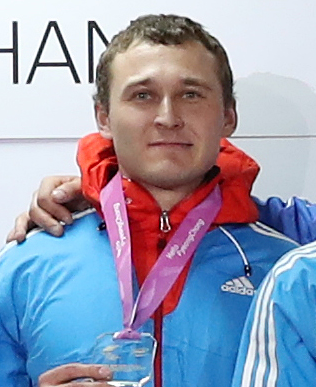
- Vasiliy Kondratenko in 2017

Personal information
- Nationality: Russian
- Born: 2 September 1989 (age 35); Krasnodar, Soviet Union (now Russia)

Sport
- Sport: Bobsleigh

Vasiliy Kondratenko (born 2 September 1989) is a Russian bobsledder. He competed in the two-man event at the 2018 Winter Olympics.
