= Carlo Valdes =

American bobsledder (born 1990)

Personal information
- Born: February 11, 1990 (age 36) Newport Beach, California, US

Sport
- Sport: Bobsleigh

Carlo Valdes (born February 11, 1990) is an American bobsledder. He competed in the four-man event at the 2018 Winter Olympics. Valdes graduated from UCLA in 2013 with a B.A. in History. At UCLA, he played wide receiver in football until his transition to track and field, where he competed as a decathlete. He mainly competed in Javelin for the rest of his time at UCLA. His father is of Mexican descent.

He qualified to represent the United States at the 2022 Winter Olympics.
