= Thomas Amrhein (bobsleigh) =

Swiss bobsledder

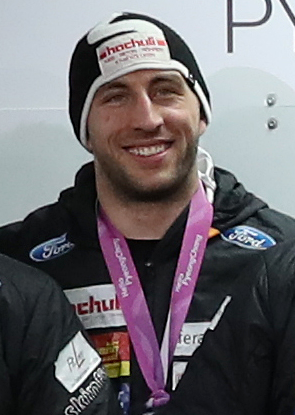
- Thomas Amrhein in 2017

Personal information
- Nationality: Swiss
- Born: 30 May 1989 (age 36)
- Height: 1.88 m (6 ft 2 in)
- Weight: 96 kg (212 lb)

Sport
- Sport: Bobsleigh

Thomas Amrhein (born 30 May 1989) is a Swiss bobsledder. He competed in the 2018 Winter Olympics.
