= Jānis Jansons (bobsledder) =

Latvian bobsledder

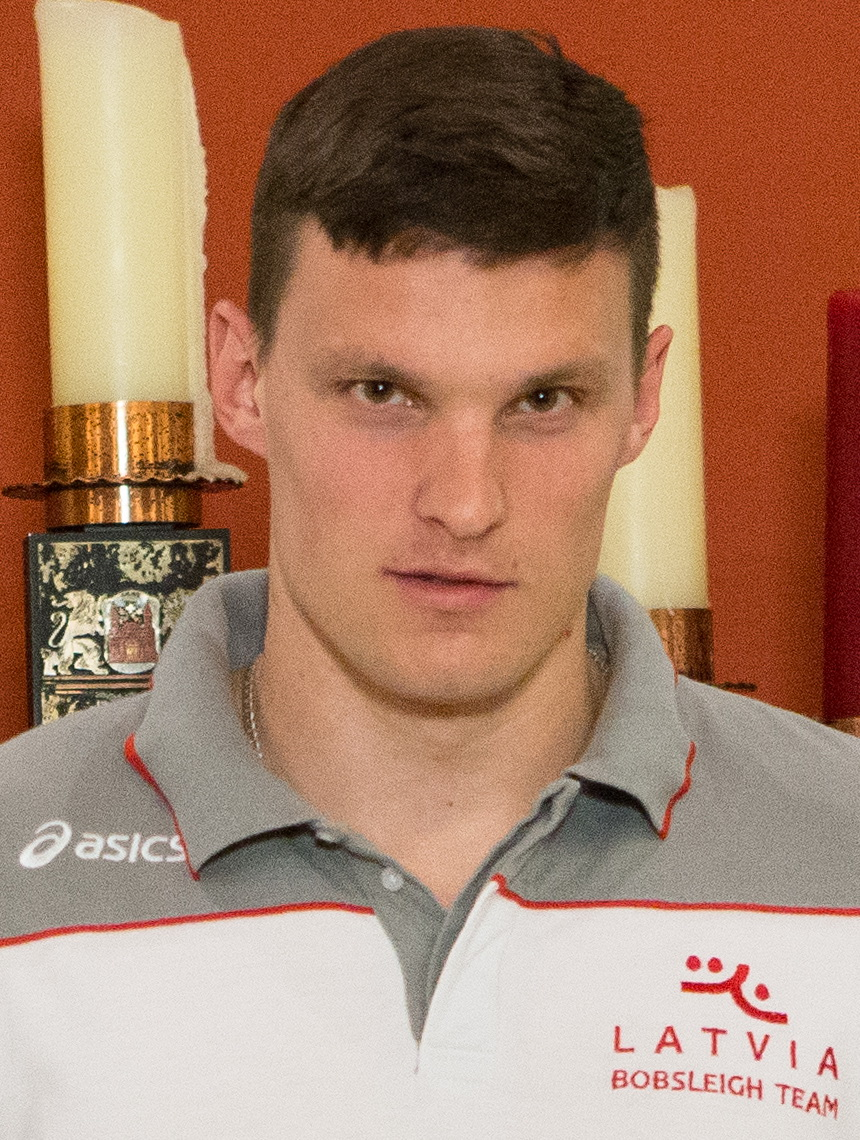
- Jānis Jansons in 2016

Personal information
- Nationality: Latvian
- Born: 25 May 1990 (age 35) Limbaži, Latvia

Sport
- Sport: Bobsleigh

Jānis Jansons (born 25 May 1990 in Limbaži) represented Latvia at the 2018 Winter Olympics in PyeongChang in the bobsled competition. He placed tenth in the four man bobsled race. Following the Olympics, Jansons was one of 20 Latvian bobsleigh and skeleton athletes to receive national funding.
