= Markus Treichl =

Austrian bobsledder (born 1993)

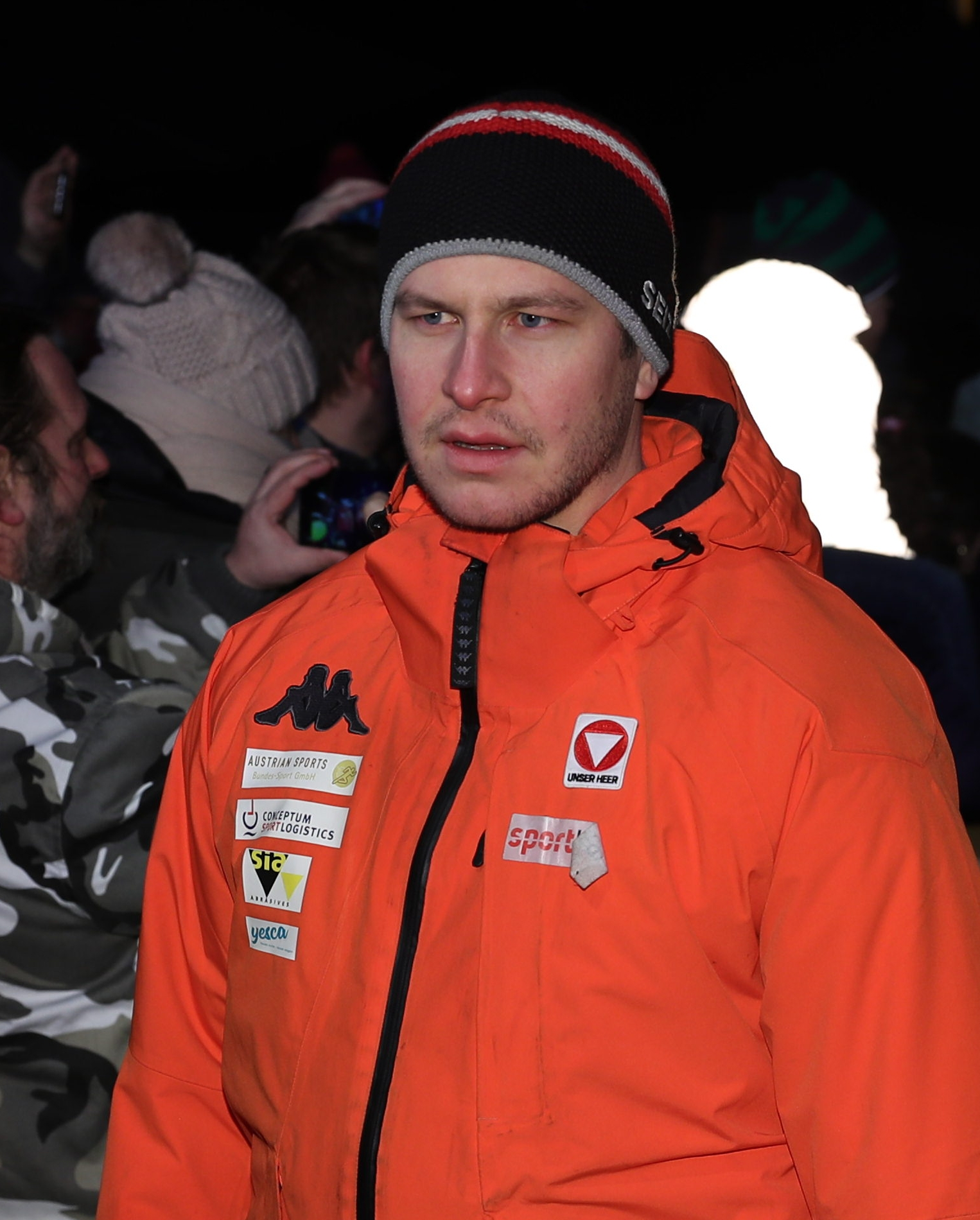
- Treichl in 2020

Personal information
- Nationality: Austrian
- Born: 28 September 1993 (age 32) Innsbruck, Austria
- Height: 1.86 m (6 ft 1 in)
- Weight: 98 kg (216 lb)

Sport
- Sport: Bobsleigh

Markus Treichl (born 28 September 1993) is an Austrian bobsledder. He competed in the two-man event and in the four-man event at the 2018 and 2022 Winter Olympics.
