= Sam McGuffie =

American athlete (born 1989)

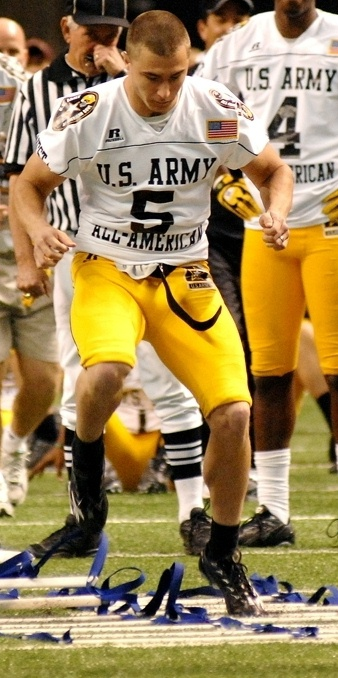
- McGuffie warming up prior to the U.S. Army All-American Bowl on January 3, 2008

Profile
- Position: Wide receiver / running back

Personal information
- Born: October 16, 1989 (age 37); Cypress, Texas, U.S.
- Listed height: 5 ft 10 in (1.78 m)
- Listed weight: 200 lb (91 kg)

Career information
- High school: Cypress (TX) Cy-Fair
- College: Rice
- NFL draft: 2013: undrafted

Career history
- Oakland Raiders (2013)*; Arizona Cardinals (2013)*; New England Patriots (2013)*; Winnipeg Blue Bombers (2014)
- * Offseason or practice squad member only

Other information

Rugby union career
- Position: Scrum-half
Amateur team(s)
| Years | Team | Apps | (Points) |
| 2016- | Tiger Rugby (Ohio) | | |
| 2016-2017 | 1823 (Ohio) | | |
Senior career
| Years | Team | Apps | (Points) |
| 2016 | Ohio Aviators | | |

Samuel Terrence McGuffie (born October 16, 1989) is an American bobsledder for the United States men's national team, a former professional football running back and wide receiver and a former rugby union player. In Canadian football, he most recently was a member of the Winnipeg Blue Bombers of the Canadian Football League (CFL). Previously in the National Football League (NFL), he had spent time with the Oakland Raiders in training camp in 2013, and then was briefly a practice squad player for the Arizona Cardinals and later the New England Patriots. He played his freshman season of college football at Michigan before transferring to Rice to play his final three seasons in his native state of Texas.

== Early life ==
McGuffie starred as a high school running back for Cy-Fair High School in Cypress, Texas, where he rushed for a total of 5,847 yards in 699 total carries and scored 83 touchdowns. Those numbers include a junior season in which he carried the ball 358 times for 3,121 yards and also scored 44 touchdowns. Sam was known to “hurdle his opponents” when they tried to tackle him. He was very elusive when he ran with the football.

McGuffie's stellar career at high school garnered a lot of attention from college football scouts. He was voted the tenth-best running back in the country by Scout.com. McGuffie was also rated a four-star recruit by Rivals.com, who also ranked him as the ninth-best running back in the nation.

== College career ==
=== Michigan ===
McGuffie was recruited heavily coming out of high school. He made his verbal commitment to play for Michigan live on Houston's television station KPRC. McGuffie chose Michigan over California, Notre Dame, Texas A&M, and USC. However, when Rich Rodriguez took over as the head coach of Michigan, McGuffie had doubts about whether to stay, though in the end he remained committed to Michigan. He attributed the decision to stay in Michigan in large part due to the presence of running backs coach Fred Jackson.

McGuffie started as a true freshman for Michigan and scored his first touchdown in a loss to Utah. When Michigan played at the University of Notre Dame, McGuffie had a breakout game, in which he rushed for 131 yards and also added 47 yards receiving with a touchdown.

McGuffie suffered three concussions during his freshman season and on December 12, 2008, McGuffie decided not to return to Michigan.

=== Rice ===
McGuffie transferred to Rice University after his freshman season at Michigan to be closer to home. During his first year at Rice, McGuffie had the third highest rushing yardage total of any back in Conference USA, with 883 yards and six touchdowns. He also had receiving totals of 384 yards and three touchdowns, making him one of only three players in the NCAA Football Bowl Subdivision to gain both 880 yards rushing and 380 yards receiving in 2010. McGuffie missed several games during the 2011 season because of injuries, including the last five games of the season. For the 2012 season, McGuffie moved to a new position as a wide receiver, catching 54 passes for 603 yards and five touchdowns.

=== Track and field ===
McGuffie was also a standout track athlete while in college at Michigan and Rice University. He competed in the 60 meters and 100 meters, posting personal bests of 6.82 seconds and 10.70 seconds, respectively. He also participated in the 60 meter hurdles, with his fastest finish in 8.42 seconds, and in the 1000 meters with a best time of 2:52.83 minutes.

In field events, McGuffie competed in the high jump and long jump, as well as the pole vault and the shot put.

==== Personal bests ====
| Event | Time (seconds) | Venue | Date |
|---|---|---|---|
| 60 meters | 6.82 | Houston, Texas | February 27, 2009 |
| 60 meter hurdles | 8.42 | Lincoln, Oregon | February 4, 2012 |
| 100 meters | 10.70 | Tulsa, Oklahoma | May 15, 2009 |
| 1000 meters | 2:52.83 | Birmingham, Alabama | February 26, 2012 |

| Event | Mark (meters) | Venue | Date |
|---|---|---|---|
| High jump | 2.00 | Lincoln, Oregon | February 3, 2012 |
| Long jump | 7.52 | Tulsa, Oklahoma | May 15, 2009 |

== Professional career ==
=== 2013 Pro Day ===
Pre-draft measurables
| Height | Weight | 40-yard dash | 10-yard split | 20-yard split | 20-yard shuttle | Three-cone drill | Vertical jump | Broad jump | Bench press |
|---|---|---|---|---|---|---|---|---|---|
| 5 ft 10 in (1.78 m) | 200 lb (91 kg) | 4.32 s | 1.45 s | 2.43 s | 3.93 s | 6.57 s | 42 in (1.07 m) | 11 ft 2 in (3.40 m) | 26 reps |
All values from ProDay.

=== Oakland Raiders ===
McGuffie went undrafted in the 2013 NFL draft, and signed a contract with the Oakland Raiders on April 27, 2013. On August 25, he was waived by the Raiders.

=== Arizona Cardinals ===
On September 3, 2013, McGuffie was signed to the Arizona Cardinals' practice squad. He was released by the Cardinals on September 17.

=== New England Patriots ===
On January 20, 2014, McGuffie signed a reserve/futures contract with the New England Patriots. He was released by New England on March 11.

=== Winnipeg Blue Bombers ===
McGuffie spent the 2014 season with the Winnipeg Blue Bombers of the Canadian Football League as running back/wide-receiver. He did not see any playing time, and was released by the Blue Bombers on April 6, 2015.

== Bobsled career ==
On October 26, 2015, McGuffie was announced as a member of the USA Bobsled National Team.

On January 15, 2018, McGuffie was announced as a member of the 2018 U.S. Olympic Men's Bobsleigh Team for the XXIII Olympic Winter Games in Pyeongchang, South Korea. McGuffie was selected as a push crewman for the four man bobsled piloted by Codie Bascue as well as the brakeman for the two-man bobsled also piloted by Bascue.
