= Lucas Mata =

Australian bobsledder

Personal information
- Nationality: Australian
- Born: 8 July 1988 (age 37)

Sport
- Sport: Bobsleigh

Lucas Mata (born 8 July 1988) is an Australian bobsledder. He competed at the FIBT World Championships 2012 in Lake Placid, and the FIBT World Championships 2013 in St. Moritz. He competed at the 2014 Winter Olympics in Sochi, in four-man bobsleigh. After the Olympics, his brakeman was Simon Dunn.
