= Simon Friedli =

Swiss bobsledder (born 1991)

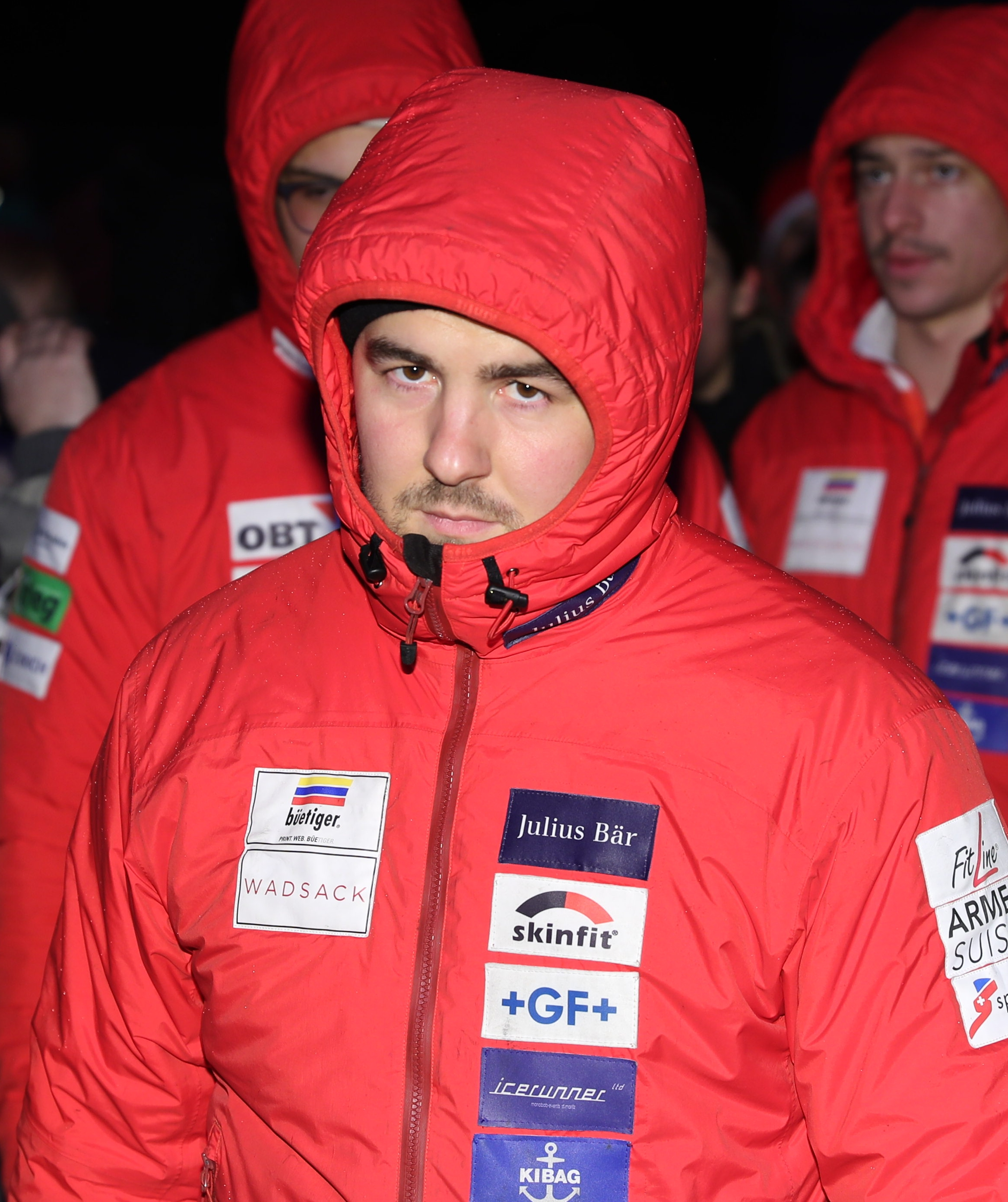
- Friedli in 2020

Personal information
- Born: 22 July 1991 (age 34) Jegenstorf, Bern, Switzerland
- Height: 180 cm (5 ft 11 in)
- Weight: 100 kg (220 lb)

Sport
- Sport: Bobsleigh
Medal record
European Championship
Silver medal – second place	2020 Sigulda	Two-man

Simon Friedli (born 22 July 1991) is a Swiss bobsledder. He competed in the two-man event at the 2018 Winter Olympics. He also competed in both the two-man event and the four-man event at the 2022 Winter Olympics.
