= Mateusz Luty =

Polish bobsledder

Personal information
- Nationality: Polish
- Born: 1 January 1990 (age 35); Kowary, Poland

Sport
- Sport: Bobsleigh

Mateusz Luty (born 1 January 1990) is a Polish bobsledder. He competed in the two-man event at the 2018 Winter Olympics.
