= Nick Poloniato =

Canadian bobsledder

Personal information
- Born: 20 July 1987 (age 38) Hamilton, Ontario, Canada
- Height: 1.83 m (6 ft 0 in)
- Weight: 100 kg (220 lb)
- Website: http://nickpoloniato.com/

Sport
- Country: Canada
- Sport: Bobsleigh
- Turned pro: 2012
Medal record
Representing Canada
World Championships
| Silver medal – second place | 2019 Whistler | Mixed team |

Nick Poloniato (born July 20, 1987) is a University football player and bobsledder. A graduate of Bishop's University where he was a member of the Bishop's Gaiters football team. He competed at several World Cup and international competitions, finishing 5th in the Two-man event at the 2017 FIBT World Championships. Nick went on to compete at the 2018 Olympics for Canada. He finished his career after the 2019 World Cup Season.
