= Rico Peter =

Swiss bobsledder (born 1983)

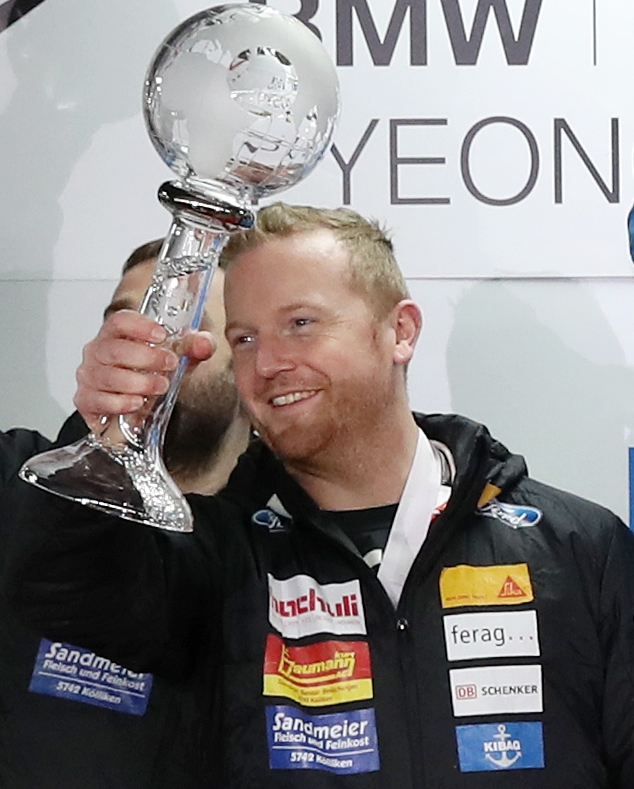
- Rico Peter at the World Cup Bob&Skeleton 2016/17 PyeongChang

Personal information
- Nationality: Swiss
- Born: 13 September 1983 (age 42) Luthern, Switzerland
- Height: 1.85 m (6 ft 1 in)
- Weight: 100 kg (220 lb)

Sport
- Country: Switzerland
- Sport: Bobsleigh (driver)
Medal record
World Championships
Bronze medal – third place	2016 Igls	Four-man

Rico Peter (born 13 September 1983) is a Swiss bobsledder.

Peter competed at the 2014 Winter Olympics for Switzerland. He teamed with brakeman Juerg Egger in the Switzerland-2 sled in the two-man event, finishing tenth.

As of April 2014, his best showing at the World Championships is 6th, in 2013 four-man event.

Peter made his World Cup debut in December 2011. As of April 2014, his best finish is 5th, in 2013-14 at Konigssee.
