= Christopher Spring =

Australian-born Canadian bobsledder

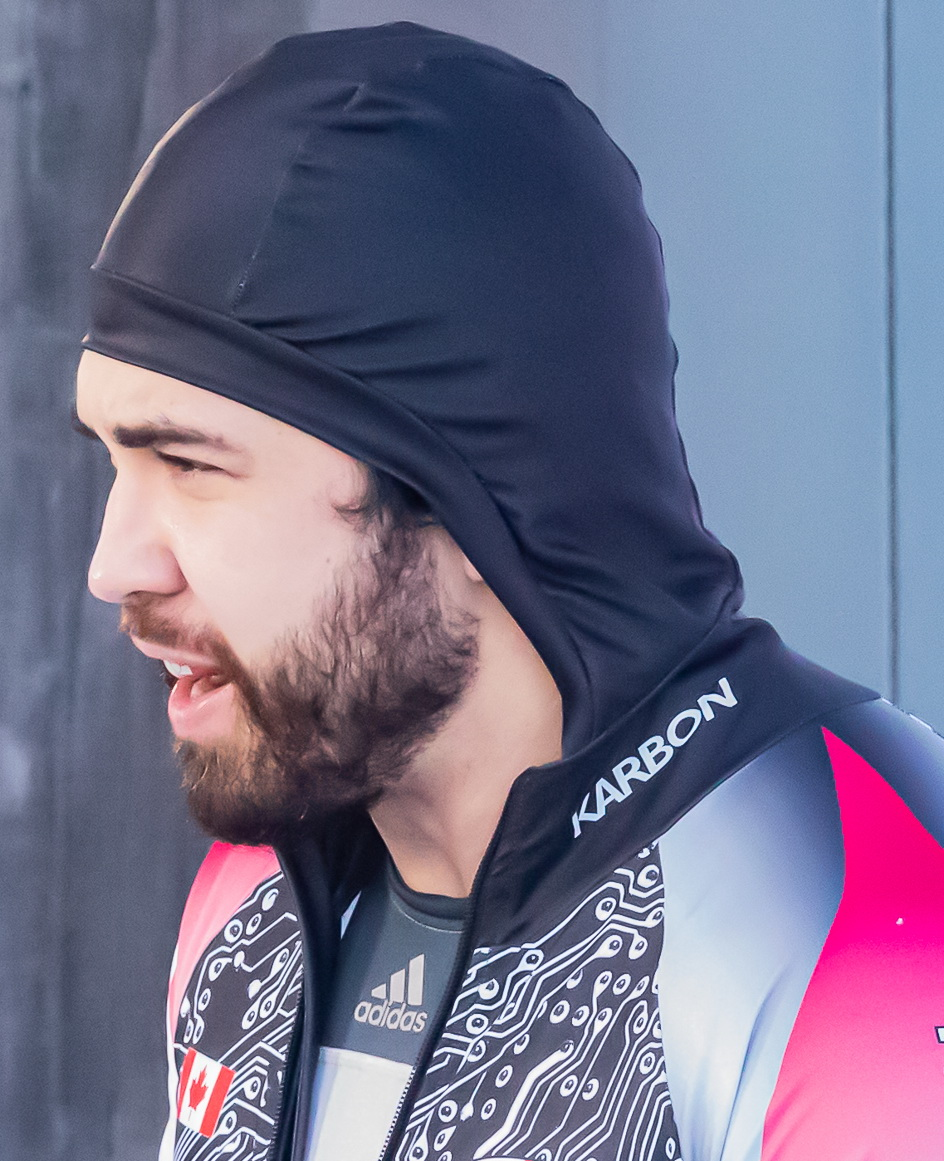
- Spring in 2021

Personal information
- Born: 6 March 1984 (age 42) Darwin, Northern Territory, Australia
- Height: 1.81 m (5 ft 11 in)
- Weight: 99 kg (218 lb)

Sport
- Country: Australia (2008–2010); Canada (2010–present)
- Sport: Bobsleigh

Achievements and titles
- Olympic finals: Vancouver 2010 Sochi 2014 Pyeonchang 2018 Beijing 2022

Christopher Spring (born 6 March 1984) is an Australian-Canadian 4 x Olympic bobsledder who has competed since 2008. At the 2010 Winter Olympics, he competed for Australia in the two-man event. He switched allegiance to Canada later in 2010, and has since competed in the 2014 Winter Olympics, 2018 Winter Olympics and the 2022 Winter Olympics for Canada.

== Career ==
Spring competed for Australia over three seasons and finished 29th in the two-man event at the FIBT World Championships 2009 in Lake Placid. He later went on to finish 22nd in the two-man event at the Vancouver 2010 Winter Olympics

Since switching to represent Canada in 2010, Spring has won nine world cup medals, including two gold and two crystal globes in both the two-man and four-man events. He has represented Canada three times at the Winter Olympic Games, with a best result of 5th in the two-man competition with brakeman Jesse Lumsden.

Spring debuted on the World Cup tour for Canada in 2011, finishing 17th in the two-man event in Cesana, Italy.

He was involved in a catastrophic crash in January 2012 during the 2011–12 Bobsleigh World Cup in Altenberg, Germany, which put him in hospital for eight days. After having his skin shredded and a piece of wood the size of a kitchen knife embedded in his back, Spring considered retiring but later returned to the track in April 2012. He said of his fear of lost skills on his return, "I was really afraid I'd get back in the driver's seat and not know what to do. Or I would get halfway down the track and start freaking out." Yet he said that he felt few ill effects.

In January 2022, Spring was named to Canada's 2022 Olympic team.

== Career highlights ==
World Championships
4th, 2019 – Whistler, two-man

FIBT (IBSF) World Cup Overall Season Championship
Third, (bronze) overall in the 2013–14 FIBT World Cup season, four-man
Third, (bronze) overall in the 2017–18 FIBT World Cup season two-man

Olympic Games
5th, 2014 - Sochi Winter Olympics, two-man
