= 2023 in ice sports =

== Bandy ==
- March 28 – April 2: The 2023 Bandy World Championship for Men & Women in Åby, Växjö
  - Men: Sweden defeated Finland, 3–1, to win their 13th Bandy World Championship title.
    - Norway won the bronze medal.
  - Women: Sweden defeated Finland, 15–0, to win their fifth consecutive and 11th overall Women's Bandy World Championship title.
    - The United States won the bronze medal.

== Bobsleigh & Skeleton ==
=== B & S World & Continental Championships ===
- December 9 & 10, 2022: 2022 IBSF World Push Championships in Lake Placid
  - Two-man bobsleigh winners: United States (Kristopher Horn & Adrian Adams)
  - Four-man bobsleigh winners: United States (Kristopher Horn, Adrian Adams, Manteo Mitchell, & Martin Christofferson)
  - Two-woman bobsleigh winners: Germany (Lisa Buckwitz & Neele Schuten)
  - Women's Monobob winner: (Germany) Lisa Buckwitz
  - Skeleton winners: (China) YIN Zheng (m) / (United States) Mystique Ro (f)
- January 13–15: IBSF Junior World Championships 2023 in Winterberg
  - Junior Two-man bobsleigh winners: Germany (Adam Ammour & Benedikt Hertel)
  - Junior Four-man bobsleigh winners: Germany (Nico Semmler, Oliver Peschk, Rupert Schenk, & Marvin Paul)
  - Junior Two-woman bobsleigh winners: Germany (Maureen Zimmer & Lauryn Siebert)
  - Junior Women's Monobob winner: (Germany) Maureen Zimmer
  - Junior Skeleton winners: (Germany) Cedric Renner (m) / (Germany) Hannah Neise (f)
  - U23 Two-man bobsleigh winners: Germany (Laurin Zern & Marvin Orthmann)
  - U23 Four-man bobsleigh winners: Germany (Laurin Zern, Jörn Wenzel, Tim Kesseler, & Marvin Orthmann)
  - U23 Two-woman bobsleigh winners: Germany (Charlotte Candrix & Cynthia Kwofie)
  - U23 Women's Monobob winner: (Germany) Charlotte Candrix
  - U20 Skeleton winners: (Austria) Roman Tanzer (m) / (United States) Hallie Clarke (f)
- January 20–22: IBSF European Championships 2023 in Altenberg
  - Two-man bobsleigh winners: Germany (Johannes Lochner & Erec Bruckert)
  - Four-man bobsleigh winners: Great Britain (Brad Hall, Greg Cackett, Taylor Lawrence, & Arran Gulliver)
  - Two-woman bobsleigh winners: Germany (Laura Nolte & Neele Schuten)
  - Women's Monobob winner: (Germany) Laura Nolte
  - Skeleton winners: (United Kingdom) Matt Weston (m) / (Germany) Tina Hermann (f)
- January 26 – February 5: IBSF World Championships 2023 in (Switzerland) St. Moritz
  - Two-man bobsleigh winners: Germany (Johannes Lochner & Georg Fleischhauer)
  - Four-man bobsleigh winners: Germany (Francesco Friedrich, Thorsten Margis, Candy Bauer, & Alexander Schüller)
  - Two-woman bobsleigh winners: Germany (Kim Kalicki & Leonie Fiebig)
  - Women's Monobob winner: (Germany) Laura Nolte
  - Skeleton winners: (United Kingdom) Matt Weston (m) / (Germany) Susanne Kreher (f)
  - Skeleton Mixed Team winners: Germany (Susanne Kreher & Christopher Grotheer)
- January 27: IBSF Para Sport European Championships 2023 in (Austria) Innsbruck
  - Para Bobsleigh winner: (Latvia) Arturs Klots
- February 2 & 3: IBSF Para Sport World Championships 2023 in (Switzerland) St. Moritz
  - Para Bobsleigh winner: (Austria) Hermann Ellmauer
- February 17: IBSF Junior European Skeleton Championships 2023 in (Austria) Innsbruck
  - Junior Skeleton winners: (Switzerland) Livio Summermatter (m) / (United Kingdom) Tabitha Stoecker (f)
  - U20 Skeleton winners: (Austria) Roman Tanzer (m) / (Switzerland) Sara Schmied (f)
- February 17 & 18: IBSF Junior European Championships 2023 in Winterberg
  - Junior Two-man bobsleigh winners: Romania (Mihai Tentea & Ciprian Daroczi)
  - Junior Four-man bobsleigh winners: Germany (Nico Semmler, Rupert Schenk, Marvin Paul, & Tim Becker)
  - Junior Two-woman bobsleigh winners: France (Margot Boch & Talia Solitude)
  - Junior Women's Monobob winner: (Germany) Maureen Zimmer
  - U23 Two-man bobsleigh winners: Germany (Laurin Zern & Marvin Orthmann)
  - U23 Four-man bobsleigh winners: Germany (Alexander Czudaj, Jörn Wenzel, Tim Kesseler, & Nino Vogel)
  - U23 Two-woman bobsleigh winners: Germany (Diana Filipszki & Sarah Neitz)
  - U23 Women's Monobob winner: (Germany) Diana Filipszki

=== B & S World Cup ===
- November 24–26, 2022: IBSF World Cup #1 in (Canada) Whistler
  - Two-man bobsleigh winners: Germany (Francesco Friedrich & Alexander Schüller)
  - Four-man bobsleigh winners: Germany (Francesco Friedrich, Alexander Schüller, Thorsten Margis, & Candy Bauer)
  - Two-woman bobsleigh winners: Germany (Kim Kalicki & Anabel Galander)
  - Women's Monobob winner: (Canada) Bianca Ribi
  - Skeleton winners: (United Kingdom) Marcus Wyatt (m) / (Germany) Hannah Neise (f)
- December 1–3, 2022: IBSF World Cup #2 in (United States) Park City
  - Two-man bobsleigh winners: Germany (Francesco Friedrich & Thorsten Margis)
  - Four-man bobsleigh winners: Germany (Francesco Friedrich, Candy Bauer, Thorsten Margis, & Alexander Schüller)
  - Two-woman bobsleigh winners: Germany (Kim Kalicki & Leonie Fiebig)
  - Women's Monobob winner: (United States) Kaillie Humphries
  - Skeleton winners: (Germany) Christopher Grotheer (m) / (Canada) Mirela Rahneva (f)
- December 16–18, 2022: IBSF World Cup #3 in Lake Placid
  - Two-man bobsleigh winners: Germany (Johannes Lochner & Georg Fleischhauer)
  - Four-man bobsleigh winners: Great Britain (Brad Hall, Taylor Lawrence, Arran Gulliver, & Greg Cackett)
  - Two-woman bobsleigh winners: United States (Kaillie Humphries & Kaysha Love)
  - Women's Monobob winner: (Germany) Laura Nolte
  - Skeleton winners: (United Kingdom) Matt Weston (m) / (Germany) Tina Hermann (f)
- January 6–8: IBSF World Cup #4 in Winterberg
  - Two-man bobsleigh winners: Germany (Johannes Lochner & Georg Fleischhauer)
  - Four-man bobsleigh winners: Germany (Francesco Friedrich, Candy Bauer, Alexander Schüller, & Thorsten Margis)
  - Two-woman bobsleigh winners: Germany (Laura Nolte & Neele Schuten)
  - Women's Monobob winner: (Germany) Laura Nolte
  - Skeleton winners: (Germany) Christopher Grotheer (m) / (Netherlands) Kimberley Bos (f)
- January 13–15: IBSF World Cup #5 in Altenberg #1
  - Two-man bobsleigh winners: Germany (Johannes Lochner & Georg Fleischhauer)
  - Four-man bobsleigh winners: Great Britain (Brad Hall, Taylor Lawrence, Arran Gulliver, & Greg Cackett)
  - Two-woman bobsleigh winners: Germany (Lisa Buckwitz & Kira Lipperheide)
  - Women's Monobob winner: (United States) Kaillie Humphries
  - Skeleton winners: (United Kingdom) Matt Weston (m) / (Germany) Tina Hermann (f)
- January 20–22: IBSF World Cup #6 in (Germany) Altenberg #2
  - Same results as the IBSF European Championships 2023 above, except for the following:
  - Two-woman bobsleigh winners: United States (Kaillie Humphries & Kaysha Love)
  - Women's Mononbob winner: (United States) Kaillie Humphries
- February 10–12: IBSF World Cup #7 in (Austria) Innsbruck
  - Note: The two-man bobsleigh results are unknown.
  - Four-man bobsleigh winners: Germany (Francesco Friedrich, Candy Bauer, Thorsten Margis, & Alexander Schüller)
  - Two-woman bobsleigh winners: Germany (Laura Nolte & Neele Schuten)
  - Women's Monobob winner: (Germany) Lisa Buckwitz
  - Skeleton winners: (United Kingdom) Matt Weston (m) / (Netherlands) Kimberley Bos (f)
- February 17–19: IBSF World Cup #8 (final) in (Latvia) Sigulda
  - Note: The four-man bobsleigh results are unknown.
  - Two-man bobsleigh winners: Germany (Johannes Lochner & Georg Fleischhauer)
  - Two-woman bobsleigh winners: Germany (Laura Nolte & Neele Schuten)
  - Women's Monobob winner: (United States) Kaillie Humphries
  - Skeleton winners: (United Kingdom) Matt Weston (m) / (Germany) Tina Hermann (f)

=== North American Cup ===
- November 9–13, 2022: North American Cup #1 in (Canada) Whistler
  - Two-man bobsleigh #1 winners: (Switzerland) (Michael Vogt & Silvio Weber)
  - Two-man bobsleigh #2 winners: (Switzerland) (Simon Friedli & Andreas Haas)
  - Four-man bobsleigh #1 winners: United Kingdom (Brad Hall, Arran Gulliver, Rory Willicombe, & Taylor Lawrence)
  - Four-man bobsleigh #2 winners: (Canada) (Taylor Austin, Davidson De Souza, William Ashley, & Cyrus Gray)
  - Two-woman bobsleigh winners: (Canada) (Bianca Ribi & Niamh Haughey) (2 times)
  - Women's Monobob winners: (United States) Kaillie Humphries (#1) / (Canada) Cynthia Appiah (#2)
  - Men's Skeleton winners: (United States) Austin Florian (#1) / (Austria) Florian Auer (#2)
  - Women's Skeleton winners: (United States) Hallie Clarke (#1) / (Czech Republic) Anna Fernstädt (#2)
- November 18–23, 2022: North American Cup #2 in (United States) Park City
  - Two-man bobsleigh #1 winners: (South Korea) (Kim Jin-su & Jung Hyun-woo)
  - Two-man bobsleigh #2 winners: (South Korea) (Kim Jin-su & Lee Kyung-yeon)
  - Two-woman bobsleigh #1 winners: (Slovakia) (Viktória Čerňanská & Lucia Kršková)
  - Two-woman bobsleigh #2 winners: (United States) (Lauren Brzozowski & Sydney Milani)
  - Four-man bobsleigh winners: South Korea (Kim Jin-su, Jung Hyun-woo, Kim Hyeong-geun, & Lee Kyung-yeon) (2 times)
  - Women's Monobob winners: (United States) Lauren Brzozowski (#1) / (Slovakia) Viktória Čerňanská (#2)
  - Men's Skeleton winner: (Republic of Ireland) Brendan Doyle (2 times)
  - Women's Skeleton winners: (Canada) Jaclyn Laberge (#1) / (Puerto Rico) Kellie Delka (#2)
- December 1–4, 2022: North American Cup #3 in (United States) Lake Placid #1
  - Note: The both two-woman bobsleigh events were cancelled.
  - Two-man bobsleigh #1 winners: Brazil (Edson Bindilatti & Edson Martins)
  - Two-man bobsleigh #2 winners: South Korea (Suk Young-jin & KIM Sun-wook)
  - Four-man bobsleigh winners: South Korea (Suk Young-jin, LEE Geon-u, JUNG Hyun-woo, & LEE Kyung-yeon) (2 times)
  - Women's Monobob winners: (Slovakia) Viktória Čerňanská (#1) / (United States) Lauren Brzozowski (#2)
  - Men's Skeleton winners: (Israel) Jared Firestone (#1) / (Czech Republic) Sebastian Zeleznik (#2)
  - Women's Skeleton winner: (France) Agathe Bessard (2 times)
- March 23–27: North American Cup #4 (final) in Lake Placid #2
  - Two-man bobsleigh #1 winners: United States (Frank del Duca & Darius Joseph)
  - Two-man bobsleigh #2 winners: Canada (Pat Norton & Keaton Bruggeling)
  - Four-man bobsleigh winners: United States (Frank del Duca, Kristopher Horn, Levi Shelter, & Darius Joseph) (2 times)
  - Two-woman bobsleigh winners: Germany (Laura Nolte & Lena Neunecker) (2 times)
  - Women's Monobob winners: (Australia) Breeana Walker (#1) / (Germany) Laura Nolte (#2)
  - Men's Skeleton winner: (United Kingdom) Jacob Salisbury (2 times)
  - Women's Skeleton winner: (United States) Mystique Ro (2 times)

=== European Cup ===
- November 16–20, 2022: European Cup #1 in (Norway) Lillehammer
  - Two-man bobsleigh #1 winners: (Germany) (Maximilian Illmann & Philipp Wobeto)
  - Two-man bobsleigh #2 winners: (Germany) (Maximilian Illmann & Lukas Koller)
  - Four-man bobsleigh #1 winners: Germany (Maximilian Illmann, Henrik Proske, Philipp Wobeto, & Joshua Tasche)
  - Four-man bobsleigh #2 winners: Germany (Maximilian Illmann, Henrik Proske, Philipp Wobeto, & Lukas Koller)
  - Two-woman bobsleigh #1 winners: (France) (Margot Boch & Carla Senechal)
  - Two-woman bobsleigh #2 winners: (France) (Margot Boch & Talia Solitude)
  - Women's Monobob winner: (France) Margot Boch (2 times)
  - Men's Skeleton winner: (China) Haifeng Zhu (2 times)
  - Women's Skeleton winners (United Kingdom) Freya Tarbit (#1) / (United States) Mystique Ro (#2)
- November 28 – December 3: European Cup #2 in Altenberg
  - Two-man bobsleigh #1 winners: Germany (Adam Ammour & Benedikt Hertel)
  - Two-man bobsleigh #2 winners: Germany (Maximilian Illmann & Lukas Koller)
  - Four-man bobsleigh winners: Germany (Nico Semmler, Oliver Peschk, Rupert Schenk, & Marvin Paul) (2 times)
  - Two-woman bobsleigh winners: Switzerland (Martina Fontanive & Mara Morell) (2 times)
  - Women's Monobob winner: (Australia) Breeana Walker (2 times)
- December 2 & 3, 2022: European Cup #3 in (Austria) Bludenz
  - Men's Skeleton winner: (Germany) Stefan Röttig (2 times)
  - Women's Skeleton winner: (United States) Mystique Ro (2 times)
- December 8–10, 2022: European Cup #4 in (Austria) Innsbruck
  - Two-man bobsleigh winners: Germany (Adam Ammour & Nick Stadelmann)
  - Four-man bobsleigh #1 winners: Germany (Nico Semmler, Marvin Paul, Oliver Peschk, & Rupert Schenk)
  - Four-man bobsleigh #2 winners: Latvia (Emīls Cipulis, Edgars Nemme, Dāvis Spriņģis, & Matīss Miknis)
  - Two-woman bobsleigh winners: Germany (Maureen Zimmer & Lauryn Siebert)
  - Women's Monobob winners: (Australia) Breeana Walker (#1) / (Germany) Maureen Zimmer (#2)
- January 19–21: European Cup #5 in (Latvia) Sigulda
  - Two-man bobsleigh #1 winners: Germany (Nico Semmler & Max Neumann)
  - Two-man bobsleigh #2 winners: Germany (Maximilian Illmann & Lukas Koller)
  - Two-woman bobsleigh winners: France (Margot Boch & Carla Senechal)
  - Women's Monobob winner: (Italy) Giada Andreutti
  - Men's Skeleton winner: (Italy) Amedeo Bagnis (2 times)
  - Women's Skeleton winners: (United Kingdom) Amelia Coltman (#1) / (Belgium) Kim Meylemans (#2)
- February 16 & 17: European Cup #6 in (Austria) Innsbruck
  - Men's Skeleton winner: (Germany) Stefan Röttig (2 times)
  - Women's Skeleton winners: (Austria) Julia Erlacher (#1) / (United Kingdom) Tabitha Stoecker (#2)
- February 17 & 18: European Cup #7 (final) in Winterberg
  - Two-man bobsleigh winners: Romania (Mihai Tentea & Ciprian Daroczi)
  - Four-man bobsleigh winners: Germany (Nico Semmler, Tim Becker, Marvin Paul, & Rupert Schenk) (2 times)
  - Two-woman bobsleigh winners: France (Margot Boch & Carla Senechal) (2 times)
  - Women's Monobob winner: (Germany) Maureen Zimmer

=== Intercontinental Cup ===
- November 11–13, 2022: Intercontinental Cup #1 in (Norway) Lillehammer
  - Men's Skeleton winner: (Italy) Mattia Gaspari (2 times)
  - Women's Skeleton winners: (United States) Mystique Ro (#1) / (Italy) Valentina Margaglio (#2)
- November 26 & 27, 2022: Intercontinental Cup #2 in (Germany) Winterberg
  - Men's Skeleton winner: (Germany) Alexander Gassner (2 times)
  - Women's Skeleton winner: (Germany) Jacqueline Lölling (2 times)
- December 17 & 18, 2022: Intercontinental Cup #3 in (South Korea) PyeongChang
  - Men's Skeleton winners: (Germany) Lukas David Nydegger (#1) / (Germany) Alexander Gassner (#2)
  - Women's Skeleton winners: (Germany) Jacqueline Lölling (#1) / (United Kingdom) Amelia Coltman (#2)
- February 17 & 18: Intercontinental Cup #4 (final) in (Austria) Innsbruck
  - Men's Skeleton winners: (United Kingdom) Laurence Bostock (#1) / (Germany) Lukas David Nydegger (#2)
  - Women's Skeleton winners: (United States) Mystique Ro (#1) / (Germany) Corinna Leipold (#2)

=== Para Sport World Cup ===
- November 19 & 20, 2022: Para Sport World Cup #1 in (United States) Lake Placid
  - Para Bobsleigh winners: (United States) Guillermo Castillo (#1) / (Spain) Israel Blanco (#2)
- January 26 & 27: Para Sport World Cup #2 in (Austria) Innsbruck
  - Para Bobsleigh winners: (United States) Guillermo Castillo (#1) / (Latvia) Arturs Klots (#2)
- February 11 & 12: Para Sport World Cup #3 (final) in (Norway) Lillehammer
  - Para Bobsleigh winners: (Austria) Hermann Ellmauer (#1) / (United Kingdom) Corie Mapp (#2)

=== Other ===
- March 10 & 11: Sanctioned Race in PyeongChang
  - Note: The four-man bobsleigh event was cancelled.
  - Two-man bobsleigh winners: South Korea (Suk Young-jin & KIM Sun-wook)
  - Two-woman bobsleigh winners: South Korea (Kim Yoo-ran & JEON Eun-ji)
  - Women's Monobob winner: (South Korea) Kim Yoo-ran
  - Skeleton winners: (South Korea) SIM Hyung-jun (m) / (South Korea) YANG Seok-ju (f)

== Curling ==
=== 2022–23 International curling championships ===
- October 15–22, 2022: 2022 World Mixed Curling Championship in Aberdeen
  - Canada (Skip: Jean-Michel Ménard) defeated Scotland (Skip: Cameron Bryce), 7–4, to win their third consecutive World Mixed Curling Championship title.
    - Switzerland (Skip: Ursi Hegner) took third place.
- October 31 – November 6, 2022: 2022 Pan Continental Curling Championships in Calgary (debut event)
  - Men's A: Canada (Skip: Brad Gushue) defeated South Korea (Skip: Jeong Byeong-jin), 11–3, to win the inaugural Pan Continental Curling Championships title.
    - The United States (Skip: Korey Dropkin) took third place.
  - Women's A: Japan (Skip: Satsuki Fujisawa) defeated South Korea (Skip: Ha Seung-youn), 8–6, to win the inaugural Pan Continental Curling Championships title.
    - Canada (Skip: Kerri Einarson) took third place.
- November 19–26, 2022: 2022 European Curling Championships in (Sweden) Östersund
  - Men: Scotland (Skip: Bruce Mouat) defeated Switzerland (Skip: Yannick Schwaller), 5–4, to win their 15th European Curling Championships title.
    - Italy (Skip: Joël Retornaz) took third place.
  - Women: Denmark (Skip: Madeleine Dupont) defeated Switzerland (Skip: Silvana Tirinzoni), 8–4, to win their second European Curling Championships title.
    - Scotland (Skip: Rebecca Morrison) took third place.
- February 25 – March 4: 2023 World Junior Curling Championships in Füssen
  - Men: China (Skip: Fei Xueqing) defeated Germany (Skip: Benjamin Kapp), 8–7, to win China's first World Junior Curling Championships title.
    - Scotland (Skip: Orrin Carson) took third place.
  - Women: Scotland (Skip: Fay Henderson) defeated Japan (Skip: Yuina Miura), 9–7, to win Scotland's tenth World Junior Curling Championships title.
    - Norway (Skip: Torild Bjørnstad) took third place.
- March 4–12: 2023 World Wheelchair Curling Championship in Richmond
  - China (Skip: Wang Haitao) defeated Canada (Skip: Mark Ideson), 5–2, to win China's second consecutive and third overall World Wheelchair Curling Championship title.
    - Scotland (Skip: Hugh Nibloe) took third place.
- March 4–12: 2023 World Wheelchair Mixed Doubles Curling Championship in Richmond
  - Latvia (Poļina Rožkova & Agris Lasmans) defeated the United States (Pam Wilson & David Samsa), 11–8, to win Latvia's first World Wheelchair Mixed Doubles Curling Championship title.
    - Canada (Collinda Joseph & Dennis Thiessen) took third place.
- March 18–26: 2023 World Women's Curling Championship in (Sweden) Sandviken
  - Switzerland (Skip: Silvana Tirinzoni) defeated Norway (Skip: Marianne Rørvik), 6–3, to win Switzerland's fourth consecutive and tenth overall World Women's Curling Championship title.
    - Canada (Skip: Kerri Einarson) took third place.
- April 1–9: 2023 World Men's Curling Championship in Ottawa
  - Scotland (Skip: Bruce Mouat) defeated Canada (Skip: Brad Gushue), 9–3, to win Scotland's sixth overall World Men's Curling Championship title.
    - Switzerland (Skip: Yannick Schwaller) took third place.
- April 22–29: 2023 World Mixed Doubles Curling Championship in (South Korea) Gangneung
- April 22–29: 2023 World Senior Curling Championships in (South Korea) Gangneung

=== 2022–23 Season of Champions ===
- September 21–25, 2022: 2022 PointsBet Invitational in (New Brunswick) Fredericton (debut event)
  - Men: Team (Manitoba) Reid Carruthers defeated Team (Manitoba) Matt Dunstone, 8–4, to win the inaugural PointsBet Invitational title.
  - Women: Team (Manitoba) Jennifer Jones defeated Team (Alberta) Casey Scheidegger, 7–4, to win the inaugural PointsBet Invitational title.
    - Note for Women: Kristie Moore replaced Casey Scheidegger.
- February 17–26: 2023 Scotties Tournament of Hearts in (British Columbia) Kamloops
  - Team Canada (Skip: Kerri Einarson) defeated Team Manitoba (Skip: Jennifer Jones), 10–4, to win her fourth consecutive Scotties Tournament of Hearts championship.
- March 3–12: 2023 Tim Hortons Brier in (Ontario) London
  - Team Canada (Skip: Brad Gushue) defeated Team Manitoba (Skip: Matt Dunstone), 7–5, to win his second consecutive and fifth Tim Hortons Brier championship.

=== 2022–23 Grand Slam of Curling ===
- October 4–9, 2022: 2022 National in (Ontario) North Bay
  - Men: Team (Newfoundland and Labrador) Brad Gushue defeated Team (Sweden) Niklas Edin, 5–4, to win their fourth National title.
  - Women: Team (Switzerland) Silvana Tirinzoni defeated Team (Manitoba) Kerri Einarson, 7–3, to win their first National title.
- October 18–23, 2022: 2022 Tour Challenge in (Alberta) Grande Prairie
  - Men's Tier 1: Team (Sweden) Niklas Edin defeated Team (Manitoba) Matt Dunstone, 7–3, to win their second Tour Challenge title.
    - Note for Men's Tier 1: Oskar Eriksson was the skip for the semifinal and final of this event.
  - Women's Tier 1: Team (Ontario) Tracy Fleury defeated Team (Manitoba) Kerri Einarson, 8–4, to win their second Tour Challenge title.
- December 6–11, 2022: 2022 Masters in (Ontario) Oakville
  - Men: Team (Italy) Joël Retornaz defeated Team (Scotland) Bruce Mouat, 6–2, to win their first Masters title.
  - Women: Team (Manitoba) Kerri Einarson defeated Team (Ontario) Tracy Fleury, 6–5, to win their first Masters title.
- January 10–15: 2023 Canadian Open in Camrose
  - Men: Team Brendan Bottcher defeated Team (Sweden) Niklas Edin, 5–3, to win Alberta's eighth Canadian Open title.
  - Women: Team Satsuki Fujisawa defeated Team (Manitoba) Kerri Einarson, 5–3, to win Japan's first Canadian Open title.
- April 11–16: 2023 Players' Championship in (Ontario) Toronto
  - Men: Team (Alberta) Kevin Koe defeated Team (Switzerland) Yannick Schwaller, 5–4, to win their third Players' Championship title.
  - Women: Team (Sweden) Isabella Wranå defeated Team (Switzerland) Silvana Tirinzoni, 6–5, to win their first Players' Championship title.
- May 2–7: 2023 Champions Cup in (Saskatchewan) Regina

== Figure skating ==
=== ISU Figure Skating Championships ===
- January 23–29: 2023 European Figure Skating Championships in (Finland) Espoo
  - Men's Singles winner: (France) Adam Siao Him Fa
  - Ladies' Singles winner: (Georgia (country)) Anastasia Gubanova
  - Pairs winners: Italy (Sara Conti & Niccolò Macii)
  - Ice Dance winners: Italy (Charlène Guignard & Marco Fabbri)
- February 7–12: 2023 Four Continents Figure Skating Championships in Colorado Springs
  - Men's Singles winner: (Japan) Kao Miura
  - Ladies' Singles winner: (South Korea) Lee Hae-in
  - Pairs winners: Japan (Riku Miura & Ryuichi Kihara)
  - Ice Dance winners: United States (Madison Chock & Evan Bates)
- February 27 – March 5: 2023 World Junior Figure Skating Championships in (Canada) Calgary
  - Junior Men's Singles winner: (Japan) Kao Miura
  - Junior Ladies' Singles winner: (Japan) Mao Shimada
  - Junior Pairs winners: United States (Sophia Baram & Daniel Tioumentsev)
  - Junior Ice Dance winners: Czech Republic (Kateřina Mrázková & Daniel Mrázek)
- March 20–26: 2023 World Figure Skating Championships in Saitama
  - Men's Singles winner: (Japan) Shoma Uno
  - Ladies' Singles winner: (Japan) Kaori Sakamoto
  - Pairs winners: Japan (Riku Miura & Ryuichi Kihara)
  - Ice Dance winners: United States (Madison Chock & Evan Bates)

=== 2022–23 ISU Grand Prix of Figure Skating ===
- October 21–23: 2022 Skate America in Norwood
  - Men's Singles winner: (United States) Ilia Malinin
  - Ladies' Singles winner: (Japan) Kaori Sakamoto
  - Pairs winners: United States (Alexa Knierim & Brandon Frazier)
  - Ice Dance winners: United States (Madison Chock & Evan Bates)
- October 28–30: 2022 Skate Canada International in Mississauga
  - Men's Singles winner: (Japan) Shoma Uno
  - Ladies' Singles winner: (Japan) Rinka Watanabe
  - Pairs winners: Japan (Riku Miura & Ryuichi Kihara)
  - Ice Dance winners: Canada (Piper Gilles & Paul Poirier)
- November 4–6: 2022 Grand Prix de France in Angers
  - Men's Singles winner: (France) Adam Siao Him Fa
  - Ladies' Singles winner: (Austria) Olga Mikutina
  - Pairs winners: Canada (Deanna Stellato & Maxime Deschamps)
  - Ice Dance winners: Italy (Charlène Guignard & Marco Fabbri)
- November 11–13: 2022 MK John Wilson Trophy in (United Kingdom) Sheffield
  - Men's Singles winner: (Italy) Daniel Grassl
  - Ladies' Singles winner: (Japan) Mai Mihara
  - Pairs winners: United States (Alexa Knierim & Brandon Frazier)
  - Ice Dance winners: Italy (Charlène Guignard & Marco Fabbri)
- November 18–20: 2022 NHK Trophy in Sapporo
  - Men's Singles winner: (Japan) Shoma Uno
  - Ladies' Singles winner: (South Korea) Kim Ye-lim
  - Pairs winners: Japan (Riku Miura & Ryuichi Kihara)
  - Ice Dance winners: Canada (Laurence Fournier Beaudry & Nikolaj Sørensen)
- November 25–27: 2022 Grand Prix of Espoo in (Finland) Espoo
  - Men's Singles winner: (United States) Ilia Malinin
  - Ladies' Singles winner: (Japan) Mai Mihara
  - Pairs winners: Italy (Rebecca Ghilardi & Filippo Ambrosini)
  - Ice Dance winners: Canada (Piper Gilles & Paul Poirier)
- December 8–11: 2022–23 Grand Prix of Figure Skating Final in (Italy) Torino
  - Senior Men's Singles winner: (Japan) Shoma Uno
  - Senior Ladies' Singles winner: (Japan) Mai Mihara
  - Senior Pairs winners: Japan (Riku Miura & Ryuichi Kihara)
  - Senior Ice Dance winners: Canada (Piper Gilles & Paul Poirier)
  - Junior Men's Singles winner: (Italy) Nikolaj Memola
  - Junior Ladies' Singles winner: (Japan) Mao Shimada
  - Junior Pairs winners: Australia (Anastasia Golubeva & Hektor Giotopoulos Moore)
  - Junior Ice Dance winners: Canada (Nadiia Bashynska & Peter Beaumont)

=== 2022–23 ISU Junior Grand Prix ===
- August 24–27: ISU Junior Grand Prix in France in Courchevel
  - Men's Singles winner: (Japan) Shunsuke Nakamura
  - Ladies' Singles winner: (Japan) Hana Yoshida
  - Ice Dance winners: South Korea (Hannah Lim & Ye Quan)
- August 31 – September 3: ISU Junior Grand Prix in the Czech Republic in Ostrava
  - Men's Singles winner: (Japan) Nozomu Yoshioka
  - Ladies' Singles winner: (Japan) Mao Shimada
  - Pairs winners: United States (Sophia Baram & Daniel Tioumentsev)
  - Ice Dance winners: Czech Republic (Kateřina Mrázková & Daniel Mrázek)
- September 7–10: ISU Junior Grand Prix in Latvia in Riga
  - Men's Singles winner: (Italy) Nikolaj Memola
  - Ladies' Singles winner: (South Korea) Shin Ji-a
  - Pairs winners: United States (Cayla Smith & Andy Deng)
  - Ice Dance winners: Germany (Darya Grimm & Michail Savitskiy)
- September 21–24: ISU Junior Grand Prix in Armenia in Yerevan
  - Event cancelled.
- September 28 – October 1: ISU Junior Grand Prix in Poland in Gdańsk #1
  - Men's Singles winner: (United States) Lucas Broussard
  - Ladies' Singles winner: (Japan) Mao Shimada
  - Pairs winners: Australia (Anastasia Golubeva & Hektor Giotopoulos Moore)
  - Ice Dance winners: Canada (Nadiia Bashynska & Peter Beaumont)
- October 5–8: ISU Junior Grand Prix in Poland in Gdańsk #2
  - Men's Singles winner: (Japan) Takeru Amine Kataise
  - Ladies' Singles winner: (Japan) Ami Nakai
  - Pairs winners: Australia (Anastasia Golubeva & Hektor Giotopoulos Moore)
  - Ice Dance winners: Canada (Nadiia Bashynska & Peter Beaumont)
- October 12–15: ISU Junior Grand Prix in Italy in Egna
  - Men's Singles winner: (United States) Lucas Broussard
  - Ladies' Singles winner: (Japan) Hana Yoshida
  - Ice Dance winners: Czech Republic (Kateřina Mrázková & Daniel Mrázek)

== Ice hockey ==
=== Ice Hockey World Championships ===
- February 27 – March 5: 2023 IIHF World Championship Division III – Group B in (Bosnia and Herzegovina) Sarajevo
  - Kyrgyzstan was promoted to Division III – Group A. Malaysia was relegated to Division IV.
- March 23–26: 2023 IIHF World Championship Division IV in (Mongolia) Ulaanbaatar
  - The Philippines was promoted to Division III – Group B.
- April 15–21: 2023 IIHF World Championship Division II – Group A in Madrid
  - Spain was promoted to Division I – Group B. Iceland was relegated to Division II – Group B.
- April 17–23: 2023 IIHF World Championship Division II – Group B in (Turkey) Istanbul
  - The United Arab Emirates was promoted to Division II – Group A. Mexico was relegated to Division III – Group A.
- April 17–23: 2023 IIHF World Championship Division III – Group A in (South Africa) Cape Town
  - Chinese Taipei was promoted to Division II – Group B. North Korea withdrew from tournament and was relegated to Division III – Group B.
- April 23–29: 2023 IIHF World Championship Division I – Group B in (Estonia) Tallinn
  - Japan was promoted to Division I – Group A. Serbia was relegated to Division II – Group A.
- April 29 – May 5: 2023 IIHF World Championship Division I – Group A in (United Kingdom) Nottingham
  - Great Britain and Poland were promoted to the Top Division. Lithuania was relegated to Division I – Group B.
- May 12–28: 2023 IIHF World Championship in (Finland) Tampere & Riga
  - Canada defeated Germany, 5–2, to win their 28th IIHF World Championship title.
  - Latvia defeated the United States, 4–3 in overtime, to win the bronze medal.
  - Hungary and Slovenia were relegated to Division I – Group A.

=== IIHF World Junior Championship ===
- December 11–17, 2022: 2023 World Junior Ice Hockey Championships – Division I Group A in Asker
  - Norway was promoted to the Top Division. Slovenia was relegated to Division I – Group B.
- December 11–17, 2022: 2023 World Junior Ice Hockey Championships – Division I Group B in (Poland) Bytom
  - Japan was promoted to Division I – Group A. South Korea was relegated to Division II – Group A.
- December 11–17, 2022: 2023 World Junior Ice Hockey Championships – Division II Group A in (Lithuania) Kaunas
  - Croatia was promoted to Division I – Group B. Romania was relegated to Division II – Group B.
- December 26, 2022 – January 5: 2023 World Junior Ice Hockey Championships in Halifax & Moncton
  - Canada defeated Czechia, 3–2 in overtime, to win their second consecutive and 20th overall WJIH title.
  - The United States defeated Sweden, 8–7 in overtime, to win the bronze medal.
  - Austria was relegated to Division I – Group A.
- January 16–22: 2023 World Junior Ice Hockey Championships – Division II Group B in (Iceland) Reykjavík
  - China was promoted to Division II – Group A. Mexico was relegated to Division III.
- January 26 – February 2: 2023 World Junior Ice Hockey Championships – Division III in (Turkey) Istanbul
  - Australia was promoted to Division II – Group B.

=== IIHF World U18 Championship ===
- March 12–18: 2023 IIHF World U18 Championship Division III Group A in (Iceland) Akureyri
  - Israel was promoted to Division II Group B. Luxembourg was relegated to Division III Group B.
- March 13–16: 2023 IIHF World U18 Championship Division III Group B in (South Africa) Cape Town
  - New Zealand was promoted to Division III Group A.
- March 27 – April 2: 2023 IIHF World U18 Championship Division II Group B in (Bulgaria) Sofia
  - The Netherlands was promoted to Division II Group A. Belgium was relegated to Division III Group A.
- April 9–15: 2023 IIHF World U18 Championship Division II Group A in (Serbia) Belgrade
  - Lithuania was promoted to Division I Group B. Spain was relegated to Division II Group B.
- April 10–16: 2023 IIHF World U18 Championship Division I Group B in (Slovenia) Bled
  - Austria was promoted to Division I Group A. Poland was relegated to Division II Group A.
- April 20–30: 2023 IIHF World U18 Championships in (Switzerland) Basel & Porrentruy
  - The United States defeated Sweden, 3–2 in overtime, to win their eleventh World U18 Championship title.
  - Canada defeated Slovakia, 4–3 in overtime, to win the bronze medal.
  - Germany was relegated to Division I Group A.
- April 23–29: 2023 IIHF World U18 Championship Division I Group A in Angers
  - Kazakhstan was promoted to the Top Division. France was relegated to Division I Group B.

=== IIHF World Women's Championship ===
- February 20–26: 2023 IIHF Women's World Championship Division II – Group B in (South Africa) Cape Town
  - Belgium was promoted to Division II – Group A. Croatia was relegated to Division III – Group A.
- March 26–31: 2023 IIHF Women's World Championship Division III – Group B in (Israel) Tnuvot
  - Serbia was promoted to Division III – Group A.
- April 2–7: 2023 IIHF Women's World Championship Division II – Group A in Mexico City
  - Latvia was promoted to Division I – Group B. North Korea withdrew from tournament and was relegated to Division II – Group B.
- April 3–9: 2023 IIHF Women's World Championship Division III – Group A in (Romania) Brașov
  - Hong Kong was promoted to Division II – Group B. Estonia was relegated to Division III – Group B.
- April 5–16: 2023 IIHF Women's World Championship in Brampton
  - The United States defeated Canada, 6–3, to win their tenth World Women's Championship title.
  - Czechia defeated Switzerland, 3–2, to win their second consecutive bronze medal.
  - Hungary and France were relegated to Division I – Group A.
- April 17–23: 2023 IIHF Women's World Championship Division I – Group B in Suwon
  - South Korea was promoted to Division I – Group A. Kazakhstan was relegated to Division II – Group A.
- August 20–26: 2023 IIHF Women's World Championship Division I – Group A in (China) Shenzhen

=== IIHF World Women's U18 Championship ===
- January 8–15: 2023 IIHF World Women's U18 Championship in Östersund
  - Canada defeated Sweden, 10–0, to win their second consecutive and seventh World Women's U18 Championship title.
  - The United States won the bronze medal.
  - Japan was relegated to Division I – Group A.
- January 9–15: 2023 IIHF World Women's U18 Championship Division I – Group A in (Italy) Ritten
  - Germany was promoted to Top Division. Norway was relegated to Division I – Group B.
- January 9–15: 2023 IIHF World Women's U18 Championship Division I – Group B in (Poland) Katowice
  - Denmark was promoted to Division I – Group A. China was relegated to Division II – Group A.
- January 21–27: 2023 IIHF World Women's U18 Championship Division II – Group A in (United Kingdom) Dumfries
  - Australia was promoted to Division I – Group B. Mexico was relegated to Division II – Group B.
- January 26 – February 1: 2023 IIHF World Women's U18 Championship Division II – Group B in (Bulgaria) Sofia
  - Kazakhstan was promoted to Division II – Group A.

=== National Hockey League ===
- October 7, 2022 – April 13, 2023: 2022–23 NHL season
  - Presidents' Trophy and Eastern Conference winners: (Massachusetts) Boston Bruins
  - Western Conference winners: (Nevada) Vegas Golden Knights
  - Art Ross Trophy winner: (Ontario) Connor McDavid ( (Alberta) Edmonton Oilers)
- January 2: 2023 NHL Winter Classic at Fenway Park in (Massachusetts) Boston
  - The (Massachusetts) Boston Bruins defeated the (Pennsylvania) Pittsburgh Penguins, 2–1.
- February 4: 2023 National Hockey League All-Star Game at FLA Live Arena in (Florida) Sunrise
  - Fastest skater: (Russia) Andrei Svechnikov ( (North Carolina) Carolina Hurricanes)
  - Hardest shot: (Sweden) Elias Pettersson ( (British Columbia) Vancouver Canucks)
  - Breakaway challenge: (Tie) (Nova Scotia) Sidney Crosby ( (Pennsylvania) Pittsburgh Penguins) & (Russia) Alexander Ovechkin ( (Washington, D.C.) Washington Capitals)
  - Accuracy shooting: (Minnesota) Brock Nelson ( (New York (state)) New York Islanders)
  - The Atlantic Division defeats the Central Division, with the score of 7–5.
- February 18: 2023 NHL Stadium Series at Carter–Finley Stadium in (North Carolina) Raleigh
  - The (North Carolina) Carolina Hurricanes defeated the (Washington, D.C.) Washington Capitals, with the score of 4–1.
- April 17 – June 13: 2023 Stanley Cup playoffs
  - Eastern Conference champions: Florida Panthers
  - Western Conference champions: (Nevada) Vegas Golden Knights
  - The (Nevada) Vegas Golden Knights defeated the Florida Panthers, 4–1 in games played, to win their first Stanley Cup title.
  - Conn Smythe Trophy winner: (Quebec) Jonathan Marchessault ( (Nevada) Vegas Golden Knights)
- June 28 & 29: 2023 NHL entry draft at Bridgestone Arena in (Tennessee) Nashville
  - #1 overall pick: (British Columbia) Connor Bedard (to the (Illinois) Chicago Blackhawks from the (Saskatchewan) Regina Pats)

=== Kontinental Hockey League ===
- September 1, 2022 – February 26: 2022–23 KHL season
  - Continental Cup and Western Conference winners: (Russia) SKA Saint Petersburg
  - Eastern Conference winners: (Russia) Ak Bars Kazan
- March 1 – April 29: 2023 Gagarin Cup playoffs
  - (Russia) CSKA Moscow defeated (Russia) Ak Bars Kazan, 4–3 in games played, to win their second consecutive and third overall Gagarin Cup title.

=== North America (ice hockey) ===
==== American Hockey League ====
- October 14, 2022 – April 16: 2022–23 AHL season
  - Macgregor Kilpatrick Trophy and Western Conference winners: (Alberta) Calgary Wranglers
  - Eastern Conference winners: (Rhode Island) Providence Bruins
- April 18 – TBD: 2023 Calder Cup playoffs

==== ECHL ====
- October 21, 2022 – April 16: 2022–23 ECHL season
  - Brabham Cup and Western Conference winners: Idaho Steelheads
  - Eastern Conference winners: (Newfoundland and Labrador) Newfoundland Growlers
- April 19 – June 9: 2023 Kelly Cup playoffs
  - The Florida Everblades defeated the Idaho Steelheads, 4–0 in games played, to win their second consecutive and third overall Kelly Cup title.

==== United States Hockey League ====
- September 9, 2022 – April 18: 2022–23 USHL season
  - Anderson Cup and Western Conference winners: (North Dakota) Fargo Force
  - Eastern Conference winners: (Illinois) Chicago Steel
- April 21 – May 19: 2023 Clark Cup playoffs
  - The (Ohio) Youngstown Phantoms defeated the (North Dakota) Fargo Force, 3–0 in games played, to win their first Clark Cup title.
  - Most Outstanding Player: (Florida) Jacob Fowler ( (Ohio) Youngstown Phantoms)

==== Junior (OHL/QMJHL/WHL) ====
- September 22, 2022 – March 25: 2022–23 QMJHL season
  - Jean Rougeau Trophy and East Division winners: Quebec Remparts
  - Central Division winners: (Quebec) Sherbrooke Phoenix
  - Maritimes Division winners: (Nova Scotia) Halifax Mooseheads
  - West Division winners: Gatineau Olympiques
    - March 31 – May 21: 2023 QMJHL playoffs
      - The Quebec Remparts defeated the (Nova Scotia) Halifax Mooseheads, 4–2 in games played, to win their sixth Gilles-Courteau Trophy title.
- September 23, 2022 – March 26: 2022–23 WHL season
  - Scotty Munro Memorial Trophy and East Division winners: (Manitoba) Winnipeg Ice
  - B.C. Division winners: (British Columbia) Kamloops Blazers
  - Central Division winners: (Alberta) Red Deer Rebels
  - U.S. Division winners: (Washington (state)) Seattle Thunderbirds
    - March 31 – May 19: 2023 WHL playoffs
      - The (Washington (state)) Seattle Thunderbirds defeated the (Manitoba) Winnipeg Ice, 4–1 in games played, to win their second Ed Chynoweth Cup title.
- September 29, 2022 – March 26: 2022–23 OHL season
  - Hamilton Spectator Trophy and East Division winners: (Ontario) Ottawa 67's
  - Central Division winners: (Ontario) North Bay Battalion
  - Midwest Division winners: (Ontario) London Knights
  - West Division winners: (Ontario) Windsor Spitfires
    - March 30 – May 21: 2023 OHL playoffs
      - The (Ontario) Peterborough Petes defeated the (Ontario) London Knights, 4–2 in games played, to win their tenth J. Ross Robertson Cup title.
- May 26 – June 4: 2023 Memorial Cup at Sandman Centre in (British Columbia) Kamloops
  - The Quebec Remparts defeated the (Washington (state)) Seattle Thunderbirds, 5–0, to win their third Memorial Cup title.

==== College (NCAA Division I) ====
- March 9 – 19: 2023 NCAA National Collegiate women's ice hockey tournament (Frozen Four at AMSOIL Arena in (Minnesota) Duluth)
  - The Wisconsin Badgers defeated the Ohio State Buckeyes, 1–0, to win their seventh NCAA National Collegiate Women's Ice Hockey title.
  - Most Outstanding Player: (New York (state)) Cami Kronish ( Wisconsin Badgers)
- March 23 – April 8: 2023 NCAA Division I men's ice hockey tournament (Frozen Four at Amalie Arena in (Florida) Tampa)
  - The (Connecticut) Quinnipiac Bobcats defeated the Minnesota Golden Gophers, 3–2 in overtime, to win their first NCAA Division I Men's Ice Hockey title.
  - Most Outstanding Player: (Nova Scotia) Jacob Quillan ( (Connecticut) Quinnipiac Bobcats)

==== Women (Premier Hockey Federation) ====
- November 5, 2022 – March 12: 2022–23 PHF season
  - Regular season winners: (Massachusetts) Boston Pride
- March 16 – 26: 2023 Isobel Cup playoffs
  - The (Ontario) Toronto Six defeated the Minnesota Whitecaps, 4–3 in overtime, to win their first Isobel Cup title.
  - MVP: (Czech Republic) Tereza Vanišová ( (Ontario) Toronto Six)

=== Europe (ice hockey) ===
==== Champions Hockey League ====
- September 1, 2022 – February 18: 2022–23 Champions Hockey League
  - (Finland) Tappara defeated (Sweden) Luleå HF, 3–2, to win their first Champions Hockey League title.
  - MVP: (Finland) Christian Heljanko ( (Finland) Tappara)

==== IIHF Continental Cup ====
- September 23, 2022 – January 15: 2022–23 IIHF Continental Cup
  - (gold) (Slovakia) HK Nitra; (silver) (France) Ducs d'Angers; (bronze) (Wales) Cardiff Devils

==== Euro Hockey Tour ====
- November 10, 2022 – May 7: 2022–23 Euro Hockey Tour

=== Asia (ice hockey) ===
==== Asia League ====
- September 3, 2022 – March 26: 2022–23 Asia League season
  - (South Korea) HL Anyang defeated (Japan) Red Eagles Hokkaido, 3–2, to win their seventh Asia League title.

==== IIHF Asia and Oceania Championship ====
- March 11 – 17: 2023 IIHF U18 Asia and Oceania Championship in Ulaanbaatar
  - (gold) Uzbekistan; (silver) Turkmenistan; (bronze) Mongolia
- April 30 – May 7: 2023 IIHF Women's Asia and Oceania Championship in Bangkok
  - Thailand defeated Iran, 3–1, to win their second consecutive Women's Asia and Oceania Championship title.
  - Singapore defeated India, 3–1, to win the bronze medal.

=== Other ice hockey tournaments ===
- September 14–18, 2022: 2022 Amerigol LATAM Cup in (United States) Coral Springs
  - Men's Division 1: (gold) Puerto Rico; (silver) Argentina; (bronze) Mexico Selects
    - Puerto Rico defeated Argentina, 4–3, to win their first Men's LATAM Cup Division 1 title.
  - Men's Division 2: (gold) Egypt Pharaohs; (silver) Stars of Israel; (bronze) Chile
    - Egypt Pharaohs defeated Stars of Israel, 3–0, to win their first Men's LATAM Cup Division 2 title.
  - U20: (gold) Puerto Rico; (silver) Team Caribbean; (bronze) Colombia
    - Puerto Rico defeated Team Caribbean, 8–1, to win their first U20 LATAM Cup title.
  - Women's: (gold) Mexico Warriors; (silver) Chile; (bronze) Colombia
    - Mexico Warriors defeated Chile, 9–4, to win their first Women's LATAM Cup title.
- May 2–6: 2023 IIHF Development Cup in (Slovakia) Bratislava
  - (gold) Liechtenstein; (silver) Argentina; (bronze) Colombia
- May 7–13: 2023 Arab Cup in Kuwait City
  - Lebanon defeated Kuwait, 9–4, to win their first Arab Cup title.
  - Oman defeated Bahrain, 6–3, to win the bronze medal.

== Luge ==
=== World & Continental Luge Championships ===
- December 16 & 17, 2022: 2022 FIL Junior European Luge Championships in Altenberg
  - Junior Singles winners: (Latvia) Kaspars Rinks (m) / (Germany) Antonia Pietschmann (f)
  - Men's Junior Doubles winners: Latvia (Kaspars Rinks & Vitalijs Jegorovs)
  - Women's Junior Doubles winners: Austria (Lisa Zimmermann & Dorothea Schwartz)
  - Junior Team winners: Germany (Antonia Pietschmann, Marco Leger, & Moritz Jäger and Valentin Steudte)
- December 16 & 17, 2022: 2022 FIL America-Pacific Luge Championship in Park City
  - Singles winners: (United States) Tucker West (m) / (United States) Emily Sweeney (f)
  - Men's Doubles winners: United States (Zack DiGregorio & Sean Hollander)
  - Women's Doubles winners: Canada (Caitlin Nash & Natalie Corless)
- December 17, 2022: 2022 FIL Asian Luge Championships in (South Korea) PyeongChang
  - Individual winners: (Japan) Kobayashi Seiya (m) / (China) WANG Jiaxue (f)
- January 14 & 15: 2023 FIL European Luge Championships in Sigulda
  - Singles winners: (Germany) Max Langenhan (m) / (Germany) Anna Berreiter (f)
  - Men's Doubles winners: Germany (Tobias Wendl & Tobias Arlt)
  - Women's Doubles winners: Italy (Andrea Vötter & Marion Oberhofer)
  - Team Relay winners: Latvia (Elīna Ieva Vītola, Kristers Aparjods, & Mārtiņš Bots and Roberts Plūme)
  - U23 Singles winners: (Latvia) Gints Bērziņš (m) / (Latvia) Elīna Ieva Vītola (f)
  - U23 Men's Doubles winners: Latvia (Eduards Ševics-Mikeļševics & Lūkass Krasts)
  - U23 Women's Doubles winners: Latvia (Anda Upīte & Sanita Ozoliņa)
- January 14 & 15: 2023 FIL World Junior Championships in (Austria) Bludenz
  - Junior Singles winners: (Latvia) Kaspars Rinkns (m) / (Ukraine) Yulianna Tunytska (f)
  - Junior Men's Doubles winners: Latvia (Kaspars Rinkns & Vitālijs Jegorovs)
  - Junior Women's Doubles winners: Latvia (Viktorija Ziediņa & Selīna Zvilna)
  - Junior Team winners: Germany (Anka Jänicke, Marco Leger, & Moritz Jäger and Valentin Steudte)
- January 28 & 29: 2023 FIL World Luge Championships in Oberhof
  - Singles winners: (Austria) Jonas Müller (m) / (Germany) Anna Berreiter (f)
  - Men's Doubles winners: Germany (Toni Eggert & Sascha Benecken)
  - Women's Doubles winners: Germany (Jessica Degenhardt & Cheyenne Rosenthal)
  - Relay winners: Germany (Anna Berreiter, Max Langenhan, Toni Eggert & Sascha Benecken)
  - Sprint winners: (Germany) Felix Loch (m) / (Germany) Dajana Eitberger (f)
  - U23 Singles winners: (Germany) Timon Grancagnolo (m) / (Germany) Merle Fräbel (f)
  - U23 Men's Doubles winners: United States (Zack DiGregorio & Sean Hollander)
  - U23 Women's Doubles winners: Germany (Jessica Degenhardt & Cheyenne Rosenthal)

=== Luge World Cup ===
- December 3 & 4, 2022: World Cup #1 in Innsbruck
  - Singles winners: (Austria) Nico Gleirscher (m) / (Austria) Madeleine Egle (f)
  - Men's Doubles winners: Austria (Juri Gatt & Riccardo Schöpf)
  - Women's Doubles winners: Austria (Selina Egle & Lara Kipp)
- December 9 & 10, 2022: World Cup #2 in (Canada) Whistler
  - Singles winners: (Germany) Felix Loch (m) / (Austria) Madeleine Egle (f)
  - Men's Doubles winners: Germany (Toni Eggert & Sascha Benecken)
  - Women's Doubles winners: Italy (Andrea Vötter & Marion Oberhofer)
  - Relay winners: Germany (Julia Taubitz, Felix Loch, Toni Eggert & Sascha Benecken)
- December 16 & 17, 2022: World Cup #3 in (United States) Park City
  - Singles winners: (Italy) Dominik Fischnaller (m) / (Germany) Dajana Eitberger (f)
  - Men's Doubles winners: Germany (Toni Eggert & Sascha Benecken)
  - Women's Doubles winners: Italy (Andrea Vötter & Marion Oberhofer)
  - Women's Sprint winner: (Germany) Julia Taubitz
  - Men's Sprint Doubles winners: Germany (Tobias Wendl & Tobias Arlt)
  - Women's Sprint Doubles winners: Austria (Selina Egle & Lara Michaela Kipp)
- January 7 & 8: World Cup #4 in Sigulda
  - Singles winners: (Latvia) Kristers Aparjods (m) / (Germany) Dajana Eitberger (f)
  - Men's Doubles winners: Latvia (Mārtiņš Bots & Roberts Plūme)
  - Women's Doubles winners: Latvia (Anda Upite & Sanija Ozoliņa)
  - Relay winners: Latvia (Elīna Ieva Vītola, Kristers Aparjods, Mārtiņš Bots & Roberts Plūme)
- February 4 & 5: World Cup #5 in Altenberg
  - Singles winners: (Germany) Max Langenhan (m) / (Germany) Julia Taubitz (f)
  - Men's Doubles winners: Germany (Toni Eggert & Sascha Benecken)
  - Women's Doubles winners: Italy (Andrea Vötter & Marion Oberhofer)
  - Relay winners: Austria (Madeleine Egle, Wolfgang Kindl, Yannick Müller & Armin Frauscher)
- February 11 & 12: World Cup #6 in Winterberg #1
  - Singles winners: (Germany) Max Langenhan (m) / (Germany) Julia Taubitz (f)
  - Men's Doubles winners: Germany (Tobias Wendl & Tobias Arlt)
  - Women's Doubles winners: Germany (Jessica Degenhardt & Cheyenne Rosenthal)
  - Women's Sprint Doubles winners: Latvia (Anda Upite & Sanija Ozoliņa)
- February 18 & 19: World Cup #7 in (Switzerland) St. Moritz-Celerina
  - Singles winners: (Germany) Max Langenhan (m) / (Germany) Dajana Eitberger (f)
  - Men's Doubles winners: Germany (Tobias Wendl & Tobias Arlt)
  - Women's Doubles winners: Germany (Jessica Degenhardt & Cheyenne Rosenthal)
  - Relay winners: Germany (Dajana Eitberger, Max Langenhan, Tobias Wendl & Tobias Arlt)
- February 25 & 26: World Cup #8 (final) in Winterberg #2
  - Singles winners: (Germany) Max Langenhan (m) / (Austria) Madeleine Egle (f)
  - Men's Doubles winners: Germany (Tobias Wendl & Tobias Arlt)
  - Women's Doubles winners: Austria (Selina Egle & Lara Michaela Kipp)
  - Relay winners: Austria (Madeleine Egle, Jonas Müller, Juri Thomas Gatt, & Schoepf, Riccardo Martin Schöpf)
  - Women's Sprint winner: (Germany) Julia Taubitz
  - Women's Sprint Doubles winners: Latvia (Anda Upite & Sanija Ozoliņa)

== Speed skating ==
=== Long-track speed skating World & Continental championships ===
- December 2–4, 2022: 2022 ISU Four Continents Speed Skating Championships in Quebec City
  - 500 m winners: (Canada) Laurent Dubreuil (m) / (South Korea) Kim Min-sun (f)
  - 1000 m winners: (Canada) Laurent Dubreuil (m) / (South Korea) Kim Min-sun (f)
  - 1500 m winners: (Canada) Antoine Gélinas-Beaulieu (m) / (Kazakhstan) Nadezhda Morozova (f)
  - Men's 5000 m winner: (Kazakhstan) Vitaliy Chshigolev
  - Women's 3000 m winner: (Canada) Valérie Maltais
  - Mass Start winners: (South Korea) Chung Jae-won (m) / (Canada) Valérie Maltais (f)
  - Men's Team Pursuit winners: South Korea (Chung Jae-won, Um Cheon-ho, & YANG Ho-jun)
  - Women's Team Pursuit winners: Canada (Béatrice Lamarche, Maddison Pearman, & Valérie Maltais)
  - Men's Team Sprint winners: Canada (Christopher Fiola, Laurent Dubreuil, & David La Rue)
  - Women's Team Sprint winners: China (ZHANG Lina, PEI Chong, & YANG Binyu)
- January 6–8: 2023 European Speed Skating Championships in (Norway) Hamar
  - Men's 500 m Sprint winners: (Italy) David Bosa (#1) / (Netherlands) Merijn Scheperkamp (#2)
  - Women's 500 m Sprint winners: (Netherlands) Femke Kok (#1) / (Netherlands) Jutta Leerdam (#2)
  - Men's 1000 m Sprint winner: (Netherlands) Hein Otterspeer (2 times)
  - Women's 1000 m Sprint winner: (Netherlands) Jutta Leerdam (2 times)
  - All-round 500 m winners: (Netherlands) Patrick Roest (m) / (Netherlands) Antoinette de Jong (f)
  - All-round 1500 m winners: (Norway) Sander Eitrem (m) / (Netherlands) Antoinette de Jong (f)
  - All-round 5000 m winners: (Norway) Sander Eitrem (m) / (Norway) Ragne Wiklund (f)
  - All-round Men's 10000 m winner: (Netherlands) Patrick Roest
  - All-round Women's 3000 m winner: (Norway) Ragne Wiklund
- February 10–12: 2023 World Junior Speed Skating Championships in (Germany) Inzell
  - 500 m winners: (United States) Jordan Stolz (m) / (Italy) Serena Pergher (f)
  - 1000 m winners: (United States) Jordan Stolz (m) / (Netherlands) Angel Daleman (f)
  - 1500 m winners: (United States) Jordan Stolz (m) / (Netherlands) Angel Daleman (f)
  - Men's 5000 m winner: (Norway) Sigurd Henriksen
  - Women's 3000 m winner: (Japan) Momoka Horikawa
  - Mass Start winners: (Czech Republic) Lukáš Steklý (m) / (Netherlands) Angel Daleman (f)
  - Men's Team Pursuit winners: Netherlands (Sijmen Egberts, Tim Prins, & Remco Stam)
  - Women's Team Pursuit winners: Netherlands (Chloé Hoogendoorn, Jade Groenewoud, & Angel Daleman)
  - Men's Team Sprint winners: United States (Jonathan Tobon, Auggie Herman, & Jordan Stolz)
  - Women's Team Sprint winners: Netherlands (Pien Hersman, Pien Smit, & Angel Daleman)
- March 2–5: 2023 World Single Distances Speed Skating Championships in Heerenveen
  - 500 m winners: (United States) Jordan Stolz (m) / (Netherlands) Femke Kok (f)
  - 1000 m winners: (United States) Jordan Stolz (m) / (Netherlands) Jutta Leerdam (f)
  - 1500 m winners: (United States) Jordan Stolz (m) / (Netherlands) Antoinette de Jong (f)
  - Men's 5000 m winner: (Netherlands) Patrick Roest
  - Men's 10000 m winner: (Italy) Davide Ghiotto
  - Women's 3000 m winner: (Norway) Ragne Wiklund
  - Women's 5000 m winner: (Netherlands) Irene Schouten
  - Mass Start winners: (Belgium) Bart Swings (m) / (Netherlands) Marijke Groenewoud (f)
  - Men's Team Pursuit winners: Netherlands (Patrick Roest, Beau Snellink, & Marcel Bosker)
  - Women's Team Pursuit winners: Canada (Valérie Maltais, Ivanie Blondin, Isabelle Weidemann)
  - Men's Team Sprint winners: Canada (Christopher Fiola, Laurent Dubreuil, & Antoine Gélinas-Beaulieu)
  - Women's Team Sprint winners: Canada (Brooklyn McDougall, Carolina Hiller, & Ivanie Blondin)

=== Long-track speed skating World Cup ===
- November 11–13, 2022: LTSS World Cup #1 in (Norway) Stavanger
  - 500 m winners: (Japan) Yuma Murakami (m) / (South Korea) Kim Min-sun (f)
  - 1000 m winners: (United States) Jordan Stolz (m) / (Netherlands) Jutta Leerdam (f)
  - 1500 m winners: (United States) Jordan Stolz (m) / (Japan) Miho Takagi (f)
  - Men's 5000 m winner: (Netherlands) Patrick Roest
  - Women's 3000 m winner: (Norway) Ragne Wiklund
  - Mass Start winners: (Germany) Felix Rijhnen (m) / (Canada) Ivanie Blondin (f)
  - Team Pursuit winners: United States (m) / Canada (f)
- November 18–20, 2022: LTSS World Cup #2 in Heerenveen
  - 500 m winners: (Canada) Laurent Dubreuil (m) / (South Korea) Kim Min-sun (f)
  - 1000 m winners: (China) Ning Zhongyan (m) / (Netherlands) Jutta Leerdam (f)
  - 1500 m winners: (Canada) Connor Howe (m) / (Netherlands) Antoinette de Jong (f)
  - Men's 5000 m winner: (Netherlands) Patrick Roest
  - Women's 3000 m winner: (Netherlands) Irene Schouten
  - Mass Start winners: (Netherlands) Bart Hoolwerf (m) / (Netherlands) Irene Schouten (f)
  - Team Sprint winners: China (m) / Netherlands (f)
- December 9–11, 2022: LTSS World Cup #3 in Calgary #1
  - 500 m winners: (Canada) Laurent Dubreuil (m) / (South Korea) Kim Min-sun (f)
  - 1000 m winners: (Netherlands) Hein Otterspeer (m) / (Netherlands) Jutta Leerdam (f)
  - 1500 m winners: (Netherlands) Wesly Dijs (m) / (Japan) Miho Takagi (f)
  - Men's 5000 m winner: (Netherlands) Patrick Roest
  - Women's 3000 m winner: (Norway) Ragne Wiklund
  - Mass Start winners: (Italy) Andrea Giovannini (m) / (Netherlands) Irene Schouten (f)
  - Team Pursuit winners: United States (m) / Canada (f)
- December 16–18, 2022: LTSS World Cup #4 in (Canada) Calgary #2
  - 500 m winners: (South Korea) Kim Jun-ho (m) / (South Korea) Kim Min-sun (f)
  - 1000 m winners: (United States) Jordan Stolz (m) / (Netherlands) Jutta Leerdam (f)
  - 1500 m winners: (Netherlands) Kjeld Nuis (m) / (Japan) Miho Takagi (f)
  - Men's 10000 m winner: (Italy) Davide Ghiotto
  - Women's 5000 m winner: (Netherlands) Irene Schouten
  - Mass Start winners: (Belgium) Bart Swings (m) / (Netherlands) Irene Schouten (f)
  - Team Sprint winners: Poland (m) / United States (f)
- February 10–12: LTSS World Cup #5 in (Poland) Tomaszów Mazowiecki #1
  - 500 m winners: (Japan) Wataru Morishige (m) / (South Korea) Kim Min-sun (f)
  - 1000 m winners: (Netherlands) Hein Otterspeer (m) / (United States) Kimi Goetz (f)
  - 1500 m winners: (Netherlands) Kjeld Nuis (m) / (Netherlands) Marijke Groenewoud (f)
  - Men's 5000 m winner: (Italy) Davide Ghiotto
  - Women's 3000 m winner: (Norway) Ragne Wiklund
  - Mass Start winners: (Belgium) Bart Swings (m) / (Netherlands) Marijke Groenewoud (f)
  - Team Pursuit winners: Norway (m) / Canada (f)
- February 17–19: LTSS World Cup #6 (final) in (Poland) Tomaszów Mazowiecki #2
  - 500 m winners: (Japan) Yuma Murakami (m) / (Austria) Vanessa Herzog (f)
  - 1000 m winners: (Netherlands) Wesly Dijs (m) / (Netherlands) Jutta Leerdam (f)
  - 1500 m winners: (United States) Jordan Stolz (m) / (Norway) Ragne Wiklund (f)
  - Men's 5000 m winner: (Norway) Sander Eitrem
  - Women's 3000 m winner: (Norway) Ragne Wiklund
  - Mass Start winners: (Netherlands) Bart Hoolwerf (m) / (Japan) Momoka Horikawa (f)
  - Team Sprint winners: Canada (m) / United States (f)

=== Short-track speed skating World & Continental championships ===
- November 10–12, 2022: 2023 Four Continents Short Track Speed Skating Championships in Salt Lake City
  - 500 m winners: (Canada) Steven Dubois (m) / (South Korea) Shim Suk-hee (f)
  - 1000 m winners: (South Korea) Park Ji-won (m) / (Canada) Courtney Sarault (f)
  - 1500 m winners: (South Korea) Park Ji-won (m) / (Canada) Courtney Sarault (f)
  - Men's 5000 m Relay winners: China (LI Kun, LIU Guanyi, SONG Jiahua, & ZHONG Yuchen)
  - Women's 3000 m Relay winners: South Korea (Choi Min-jeong, KIM Gil-li, LEE So-youn, & Shim Suk-hee)
  - Mixed Relay winners: United States (Andrew Heo, Marcus Howard, Kristen Santos-Griswold, & Corinne Stoddard)
- January 13–15: 2023 European Short Track Speed Skating Championships in (Poland) Gdańsk
  - 500 m winners: (Italy) Pietro Sighel (m) / (Netherlands) Suzanne Schulting (f)
  - 1000 m winners: (Belgium) Stijn Desmet (m) / (Belgium) Hanne Desmet (f)
  - 1500 m winners: (Netherlands) Jens van 't Wout (m) / (Netherlands) Suzanne Schulting (f)
  - Men's 5000 m Relay winners: Netherlands (Itzhak de Laat, Friso Emons, Jens van 't Wout, & Melle van 't Wout)
  - Women's 3000 m Relay winners: Netherlands (Selma Poutsma, Suzanne Schulting, Yara van Kerkhof, & Xandra Velzeboer)
  - Mixed Relay winners: Netherlands (Itzhak de Laat, Suzanne Schulting, Jens van 't Wout, & Xandra Velzeboer)
- January 27–29: 2023 World Junior Short Track Speed Skating Championships in (Germany) Dresden
  - 500 m winners: (Poland) Michał Niewiński (m) / (Canada) Florence Brunelle (f)
  - 1000 m winners: (South Korea) LEE Dong-hyun (m) / (South Korea) KIM Gil-li (f)
  - 1500 m winners: (South Korea) LEE Dong-hyun (m) / (South Korea) KIM Gil-li (f)
  - Men's 3000 m Relay winners: South Korea (LEE Do-gyu, LEE Dong-hyun, LEE Dong-min, & SHIN Dong-min)
  - Women's 3000 m Relay winners: South Korea (KIM Gil-li, KIM Ji-won, OH Song-mi, & SEO Su-ah)
- March 10–12: 2023 World Short Track Speed Skating Championships in (South Korea) Seoul
  - 500 m winners: (Italy) Pietro Sighel (m) / (Netherlands) Xandra Velzeboer (f)
  - 1000 m winners: (South Korea) Park Ji-won (m) / (Netherlands) Xandra Velzeboer (f)
  - 1500 m winners: (South Korea) Park Ji-won (m) / (Netherlands) Suzanne Schulting (f)
  - Men's 5000 m Relay winners: China (Li Wenlong, Lim Hyo-jun, LIU Guanyi, & ZHONG Yuchen)
  - Women's 3000 m Relay winners: Netherlands (Selma Poutsma, Suzanne Schulting, Yara van Kerkhof, & Xandra Velzeboer)
  - Mixed Relay winners: Netherlands (Teun Boer, Suzanne Schulting, Jens van 't Wout, & Xandra Velzeboer)

=== Short-track speed skating World Cup ===
- October 28–30, 2022: STSS World Cup #1 in (Canada) Montreal
  - Men's 500 m winner: (Canada) Steven Dubois
  - Men's 1000 m winners: (Latvia) Roberts Kruzbergs (#1) / (Canada) Pascal Dion (#2)
  - Men's 1500 m winner: (South Korea) Park Ji-won
  - Men's 5000 m Relay winners: South Korea (HONG Kyung-hwan, Lee June-seo, LIM Yong-jin, & Park Ji-won)
  - Women's 500 m winner: (Netherlands) Xandra Velzeboer
  - Women's 1000 m winners: (Netherlands) Xandra Velzeboer (#1) / (Netherlands) Suzanne Schulting (#2)
  - Women's 1500 m winner: (Netherlands) Suzanne Schulting
  - Women's 3000 m Relay winners: Netherlands (Selma Poutsma, Suzanne Schulting, Michelle Velzeboer, & Xandra Velzeboer)
  - Mixed 2000 m Relay winners: South Korea (HONG Kyung-hwan, Kim Geon-hee, LIM Yong-jin, & Shim Suk-hee)
- November 4–6, 2022: STSS World Cup #2 in (United States) Salt Lake City
  - Men's 500 m winners: (Canada) Maxime Laoun (#1) / (Netherlands) Jens van 't Wout (#2)
  - Men's 1000 m winner: (South Korea) Park Ji-won
  - Men's 1500 m winner: (Netherlands) Jens van 't Wout
  - Men's 5000 m Relay winners: Canada (Pascal Dion, Steven Dubois, Maxime Laoun, & Jordan Pierre-Gilles)
  - Women's 500 m winners: (Canada) Kim Boutin (#1) / (Netherlands) Xandra Velzeboer (#2)
  - Women's 1000 m winner: (Netherlands) Suzanne Schulting
  - Women's 1500 m winner: (South Korea) KIM Gil-li
  - Women's 3000 m Relay winners: South Korea (Kim Geon-hee, KIM Gil-li, Seo Whi-min, & Shim Suk-hee)
  - Mixed 2000 m Relay winners: China (Li Wenlong, WANG Xinran, Zhang Chutong, & ZHONG Yuchen)
- December 9–11, 2022: STSS World Cup #3 in (Kazakhstan) Almaty #1
  - Men's 500 m winner: (South Korea) KIM Tae-sung
  - Men's 1000 m winner: (Netherlands) Jens van 't Wout
  - Men's 1500 m winners: (South Korea) HONG Kyung-hwan (#1) / (South Korea) Park Ji-won
  - Men's 5000 m Relay winners: Canada (Steven Dubois, Maxime Laoun, Jordan Pierre-Gilles, & Felix Roussel)
  - Women's 500 m winner: (Canada) Kim Boutin
  - Women's 1000 m winner: (Canada) Courtney Sarault
  - Women's 1500 m winners: (Netherlands) Suzanne Schulting (#1) / (Belgium) Hanne Desmet (#2)
  - Women's 3000 m Relay winners: Canada (Kim Boutin, Rikki Doak, Claudia Gagnon, & Courtney Sarault)
  - Mixed 2000 m Relay winners: South Korea (Choi Min-jeong, HONG Kyung-hwan, KIM Gil-li, & LIM Yong-jin)
- December 16–18, 2022: STSS World Cup #4 in (Kazakhstan) Almaty #2
  - Men's 500 m winners: (Poland) Diane Sellier (#1) / (Kazakhstan) Denis Nikisha (#2)
  - Men's 1000 m winner: (South Korea) Park Ji-won
  - Men's 1500 m winner: (South Korea) Park Ji-won
  - Men's 5000 m Relay winners: Canada (William Dandjinou, Pascal Dion, Maxime Laoun, & Jordan Pierre-Gilles)
  - Women's 500 m winners: (Netherlands) Suzanne Schulting (#1) / (Netherlands) Yara van Kerkhof (#2)
  - Women's 1000 m winner: (Netherlands) Suzanne Schulting
  - Women's 1500 m winner: (Canada) Courtney Sarault
  - Women's 3000 m Relay winners: South Korea (KIM Gil-li, LEE So-youn, Seo Whi-min, & Shim Suk-hee)
  - Mixed 2000 m Relay winners: South Korea (KIM Gil-li, LIM Yong-jin, Park Ji-won, & Shim Suk-hee)
- February 3–5: STSS World Cup #5 in (Germany) Dresden
  - Men's 500 m winner: (China) Lim Hyo-jun
  - Men's 1000 m winner: (South Korea) Park Ji-won
  - Men's 1500 m winners: (South Korea) Lee June-seo (#1) / (South Korea) Park Ji-won (#2)
  - Men's 5000 m Relay winners: China (Li Wenlong, Lim Hyo-jun, LIU Guanyi, & ZHONG Yuchen)
  - Women's 500 m winner: (Netherlands) Suzanne Schulting
  - Women's 1000 m winner: (Netherlands) Suzanne Schulting
  - Women's 1500 m winners: (South Korea) Choi Min-jeong (#1) / (South Korea) KIM Gil-li (#2)
  - Women's 3000 m Relay winners: Netherlands (Selma Poutsma, Suzanne Schulting, Yara van Kerkhof, & Xandra Velzeboer)
  - Mixed 2000 m Relay winners: Italy (Thomas Nadalini, Arianna Sighel, Pietro Sighel, & Arianna Valcepina)
- February 10–12: STSS World Cup #6 (final) in Dordrecht
  - Men's 500 m winner: (China) Lim Hyo-jun
  - Men's 1000 m winners: (Canada) Steven Dubois (#1) / (South Korea) Park Ji-won (#2)
  - Men's 1500 m winner: (South Korea) Park Ji-won
  - Men's 5000 m Relay winners: South Korea (KIM Tae-sung, LEE Dong-hyun, LIM Yong-jin, & Park Ji-won)
  - Women's 500 m winner: (Netherlands) Xandra Velzeboer
  - Women's 1000 m winners: (Canada) Kim Boutin (#1) / (Canada) Courtney Sarault (#2)
  - Women's 1500 m winner: (Belgium) Hanne Desmet
  - Women's 3000 m Relay winners: Canada (Kim Boutin, Rikki Doak, Courtney Sarault, & Renée Marie Steenge)
  - Mixed 2000 m Relay winners: Netherlands (Itzhak de Laat, Suzanne Schulting, Jens van 't Wout, & Xandra Velzeboer)
