= Ice hockey in Puerto Rico =

- Country: Puerto Rico
- Governing body: Puerto Rico Ice Hockey Association
- National teams: Men's national team; Women's national team
- First played: c. 1975
- Registered players: 600

National competitions
- Liga Boricua (2026–present)

International competitions
- AmeriGol International Hockey Association LATAM Cup; IIHF Dream Nations Cup; IIHF Men's Development Cup

The practice of ice hockey in the tropical island chain of Puerto Rico began during the late 20th Century and was initially perceived as a quixotic effort, similar to the bobsled team organized by the neighboring Caribbean country of Jamaica. Though it remains a niche sport that lacks specialized facilities for its widespread development, the National Ice Hockey Program is overseen by the Puerto Rico Ice Hockey Association (PRIHA), a governing body founded in 2020, which has been affiliated to the Puerto Rico Olympic Committee (COPUR) since 2021 and the International Ice Hockey Federation (IIHF) since 2022.

The sport was initially under the Puerto Rican Ice Hockey Federation, which began operating out of the now defunct Aguadilla Ice Skating Arena (AISA) in 2004. Built to bolster tourism in the northwestern municipality of Aguadilla, the facility was unique in the West Indies, but its ice rink was not regulation size and the equipment available was limited due to the late adoption of the sport. Ultimately, this sanctioning body ceased to operate amidst differences with the municipal government and the damage caused by hurricane Maria in 2017, after which the AISA was converted into the roller skating Aguadilla Shark Roller Rink. Under the PRIHA, the national teams of both sexes and various categories have won the Amerigol tournament, hosting other competitions and being fed by a pipeline of players from the Puerto Rican diaspora and local inline hockey competitions. Ice hockey is one of two independently organized winter sports in Puerto Rico along curling, with competition in all others being collectively overseen by the general Federación Puertorriqueña de Atletas Invernales (FPAI) of the Puerto Rico Olympic Committee (COPUR).

== History ==
=== Beginnings ===
During the 1970s, an ice skating facility named Reino de Hielo (also known as "Reina de Hielo" and "Palacio de Hielo") was inaugurated in Centro Comercial Concordia Gardens, a mall located at Río Piedras, San Juan, becoming the first venue of its class ever inaugurated in the Caribbean. It was here that the very first amateur ice hockey games in the history of Puerto Rico were played with instructor Henry Powell in charge. Auditions for a press team were held on May 21, 1979. Abroad, Jorge Rafael González Vizcarrondo played in the NCAA for the Harvard Crimson men's ice hockey team in 1976, becoming the fiesta Puerto Rican to play the sport in an American collegiate league. Reino de Hielo closed down in 1979, halting the progress of the sport. Roller hockey continued being played competitively into the 1990s.

The continued migration of Puerto Ricans to various states with ice hockey professional teams was a demographic trend that occurred throughout the entire 20th Century and continues into the 21st Century. Eventually, the first player to play in the National Hockey League (NHL), Boo Nieves of the New York Rangers, was born to the historic Nuyorican bastion in 1994. He identifies as Afro-Latino and remains the only person of Puerto Rican ascent to play in the highest level of professional ice hockey in the United States. Another figure to emerge from the Puerto Rican diaspora during this time was Rico Roman, who was part of the United States men's national ice sledge hockey team at the Paralympic Games and World Para Ice Hockey Championships for more than a decade and compiled 45 points (18 goals, 27 assists).

=== Puerto Rican Ice Hockey Federation (2004–2019) ===
The Puerto Rico Ice Hockey Federation was organized in 2004, with sports journalist and The San Juan Star collaborator Philip Painter as its Director. It was composed by anglophone expatriates of several nations living at the surfing town of some Rincón and some Puerto Ricans. In a 2010 jeremiad titled Deshielo (Melting Ice), Painter elaborated on the PRIHF's initial organization and lambasted the management and employees of the AISA, local media and politics, the tourism-based economic model, society at large and the municipal government, complaining about "soft-pedaling our problems to the International community in hopes that in time our program would return to a functioning entity". Furthermore, he considered the "National Hockey League (NHL), the International Ice Hockey Federation (IIHF) and big businesses" responsible for the overall situation as well. Painter noted that ice hockey coverage prior to the inauguration was virtually nonexistent among the Rincón colony of foreign-born residents, that despite initial skepticism he monitored the construction of the ice rink closely. According to this piece, the universal response to the initial proposal to organize a national program was to be compared to Disney's 1993 sports comedy film Cool Runnings or Saturday Night Live's 1989 sketch featuring Wayne Gretzky titled "Waikiki Hockey". Equipment was bought in from Canada and included a set of leather "Ridell (sic) metal blade skates from the late 40's and an old straight Northland stick", with Painter being surprised but not disappointed to learn that the rink was not going to be IIHF regulation size, but junior rink of only 2/3 (140' x 60') the size, which limited the gameplay to 3 on 3 games.

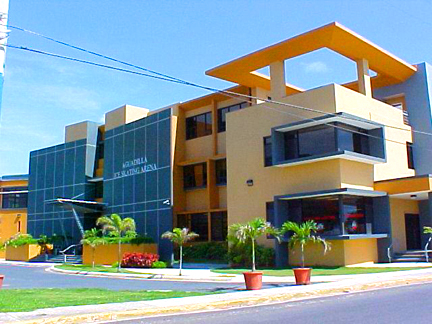
The Aguadilla Ice Skating Arena prior to hurricane Maria.

Two days before the opening day in October 2004, he volunteered to lay down the first ice sheet and assembling the Zamboni, meeting the Puerto Rico Ice Skating Team led by Lynette Spano, with whom they shared the arena as base. The team that was performed in the inauguration of the AISA included Canadians Painter and Scott, Finnish Jari and American Bundy, outfitted with uniforms from a defunct Rincón roller hockey team that featured the Boiling Nuclear Superheater Reactor Facility (BONUS) and had a radioactive theme. Despite being given a routine, most of the group had not skated in years and the rehearsals were their first time in Puerto Rico. Juan and Luis, who had skated at San Juan's Reino de Hielo ice skating facility during the 1970s, completed the team, which was named Rincón Reactors. Despite the practice and receiving a routine from Spano, Jari fell during their intervention that followed speeches by Governor Aníbal Acevedo Vilá, Aguadilla Mayor Carlos Méndez and Secretary of Sports and Recreation Jorge L. Rosario Noriega.

Despite the criticism, Painter emphasized the historic nature of the venue and also noted that the International Hockey Almanac in Prague had inquired about the PRIHF's national program. The PRIHF's stated goal wasn't "to create a world hockey power, [but] to have a place for folks who take an interest in the game to have somewhere to skate and the equipment to play." The no check, no lift rules usually used in less formal settings where used, with 5x5 games being rare initially. Early on, the AISA had about ten regulars and some visitors and equipment remained scarce due to the complete absence of ice hockey stores in the Caribbean. The arena's locale in a beachfront was considered comical, but a flow of tourists and military personnel benefited attendance, which grew overtime. By its second year the number of regulars had doubled, fueled by Puerto Ricans from various towns, with more equipment being supplied. As the sport became more organized under the PRIHF, the first ice hockey team in Puerto Rico was formed in 2005 and named Taínos (after the native Taíno people).

During the 2006–07 NHL season, Puerto Rico hosted the first exhibition game ever held by the National Hockey League (NHL) outside North America, when the Florida Panthers defeated the New York Rangers 3:2 at the José Miguel Agrelot Coliseum. The attendance was about 5,000 of which the government bused several attendees from adjacent communities. The event did not meet expectations, with ice hockey not being hosted in the coliseum since. The PRIHF continued to host its games at the AISA, renting ice time. By 2008, the venue's administration decided to shift its focus to private events, halting the skating and ice hockey development programs that were held within it. Painter called this status a "double-secret probation". This development happened while the International Ice Hockey Federation (IIHF) was reviewing the local youth program, preventing international sanctioning. The PRIHF denounced the facility administrators in various media pieces and applied for membership in the National Hockey League Players' Association (NHLPA) sanctioned Goals and Dreams initiative, expecting to find alternatives. The organization also considered another ice rink located at Torre de Oración, a now-defunct dinosaur themed church at Carolina, but discarded the idea due to the travel time involved. The lack of access to the AISA or larger facilities prevented the regular practice of the sport and discouraged development initiatives for years and membership waned. Afterwards, the PRIHF became involved in a dispute over the use of the facility, which they would use by bypassing the administration and entering the rink after hours. The organization relied on rudimentary methods to make do, using everyday items like flip flops as goal posts in the absence of formal equipment after the municipal government discarded the AISA's nets. The PRIHF requested support from NHL, the NHL Players' Association, USA Hockey and Scotiabank seeking aid, but was unsuccessful.

In this piece, Painter states that the organization approached the Puerto Rico Olympic Committee (COPUR) and the Puerto Rico Department of Sports and Recreation (DRD), informing them of the issues being faced by ice hockey, but these entities did not respond. he noted that third parties were interested in the sport and tried to participate in it, but the lack of facilities prevented organized development. According to the PRIHF, by 2011 the NHL had begun paying attention to the Puerto Rico again and the Panthers tried to host youth events, but local authorities did not facilitate the use of the ice rink or offered alternatives. The organization continued active and in 2013 sent an amateur team to the End of the World Cup tournament held at Ushuaia in the Patagonia. Experimentation with a sledge hockey program led by Karina Villegas for the population with disabilities helped reinvigorate the sport after most activities came to a halt when hurricane Maria struck Puerto Rico on September 21, 2017 as a category 4 storm, causing widespread damage to the infrastructure and destroying most of the AISA. Ron Robichaud of the Florida Sled Hockey Association helped by providing boards, glass and materials for the dressing rooms. The program appeared to be recovering with about hundred players registering, with youth programs and participation in international circuits being planned. However, the restoration of the ice rink facility was ultimately discarded by the municipal government in 2021 and the venue was later repurposed as a roller skating park.

=== Puerto Rico Ice Hockey Association (2019–present) ===
Puerto Rico debuted in the international circuits at the 2019 Amerigol LATAM Cup, fielding a Division II men's team that won the tournament's silver medal. The event was not part of the IIHF and has looser eligibility rules that allows the participation on teams that are not sanctioned by a national federation, only limiting participation to citizenship or blood ties. At this moment, the group had yet to receive the recognition of the Puerto Rico Olympic Committee (COPUR) or its winter sports subdivision, the Asociación de Atletas de Deportes Invernales. In May 2020, the Puerto Rico Ice Hockey Association began operating formally, with less than a dozen founding members. Scott Vargas, a former Division III ice hockey player for the Finlandia University Lions, served as its president and on-ice captain and began scouting talent in the island and abroad, going as far north as Canada. Initially, 85% of the players affiliated to the PRIHA were part of the Puerto Rican diaspora scattered throughout the world, with the other 15% being sourced locally. Though the organization first struggled with raising sponsorship funds, only totaling about $20,000 during their first five years, they managed to secure $65,000 of investment for facilities. This lack of support in the local market, however, represented another challenge to the program due to the frequency with which tournaments are held. National program defender Christian Jiménez was considered a professional prospect during this time. During the summer, the PRIHA has been featured on New York's National Puerto Rican Day Parade.

In 2021, the national women's team won the Division I program's first gold medal by defeating Colombia (2:0) in the final of the Latam Cup, while the men won silver in Division II. The following year, the men's national team finished second at the Amerigol LATAM Spring Classic, losing the final to Argentina (3:6). PRIHA director Jazmine Miley was contracted by Paul Smith's College to serve as coach of its women's team. At the LATAM Cup, Puerto Rico won the Men's Division I title by defeating Argentina (4:3). The program also won the women's and youth championships. The men's team won the silver medal of the Division I category of the 2023 LATAM Cup. Puerto Rico joined the IIHF as an associate member, the 83rd to join the organization, on September 28, 2022.

Winger Juan Copeland suited up for the London Knights, Lincoln Stars and debuted with the Puerto Rico men’s national team gathering 11 points (seven goals, four assists) in 2023, but went undrafted in the NHL entry draft. When interviewed, he stated that his goal was to "be able to play at the highest level I can, to show Caribbean countries that people with [our] descent play other sports than baseball or boxing. I want little kids to be able to look up and be like, ‘Wow, if that guy can play at that level, I can, too." Copeland noted that he learned of the national program out of fortuitous circumstances and networking between himself, Logan Cuvo and coach Paul Cohen. Afterwards, he signed to play junior ice hockey with the New Hampshire Mountain Kings of the North American Hockey League (NAHL). Despite not forming part of the program, the diaspora also produced professional prospect Joey Báez during this time. That season the PRIHA debuted the annual Fiesta de Hockey sports festival, debuting in the Challenger Series at Chicago with a gold medal by defeating Jamaica in the final. This event was expanded the following year for its New York edition, with the tournament including more national programs. Youth players affiliated with the program consistently expressed interest in bringing Puerto Rican ice hockey to the mainstream. In 2024, the NHL included Puerto Rico in the Amazon Prime series This is Hockey, which covered ice hockey programs in unexpected places. Parallel to this, Duzter Hockey, a Puerto Rican-owned brand of ice hockey apparel and equipment founded by program player Martín Negrón began gathering media attention abroad.

The Puerto Rico’s women's team competed in the first edition of the IIHF 3x3 Series held at Brazil in 2024, noting the difference in format. They bested Brazil and Colombia, losing the final against Argentina (3:7) to win the silver medal. In its return to the LATAM Cup, the Division I men's team finished third. In 2025, the PRIHA began the construction of an inline skating rink at Summit Arenales Academy in San Juan, where they expected to organize the first professional league of the sport in Puerto Rico. By this time, the recruitment had grown the organization's base to over 600 players, most of them in the youth development programs. The organization employed IIHF rules for 3x3 competition for adults and 4x4 for youth players. The PRIHA also announced that it expected to inaugurate a regulation-size ice rink in 2027, which would allow it to fully join the qualifying events for the Ice Hockey World Championships. While Coliseo José Miguel Agrelot at Hato Rey retained the capability to host an ice rink, the fact that the venue's business model focused on large scale events represented the same challenges for the PRIHA as it did for its predecessor. Puerto Rico opened the season at the 2025 Amerigol LATAM Cup Spring Classic, where the Men's team won the tournament and the Women's team finished as the runners-up. This was followed by participation in Challenger Series as part of Fiesta de Hockey. Its first competition under the global sanctioning body was the IIHF Dream Nations Cup, where they only competed in the men's category and won the bronze medal. Puerto Rick entered the 6th Men's Development Cup held at Gel d’Andorra in Canillo, Andorra between April and May 2025. It opened the tournament against the host nation, securing a 15:1 victory in the team’s first sanctioned match. The team followed this by besting Liechtenstein (5:2) in the second date. Puerto Rico went on to close the opening round by defeating Greece (11:1). In the team's first over time match, they edged Portugal (2:1) to advance. In the finals, Puerto Rico outscored Brazil 19:0 to close the tournament undefeated. In total, the team gathered a goal differential of 52-5 over its opponents. Rick Rodríguez served as the team's captain and noted that "huge jump for a lot a lot of guys that had been playing on the team".

With 140 players competing from the U12 to the senior categories, Puerto Rico had the largest contingent in the 2025 Amerigol LATAM Cup. The teams won bronze medals in both branches of the Division I division and the Men's Division III. Puerto Rico won the gold medal 2025 IIHF Women’s 3X3 Series by defeating Argentina (7:6) in the final. In 2026, both branches participated in the a multi-stage expanded Challenger Series tournament, winning trophies during the first leg but registering mixed results during the second. The Fiesta de Hockey also hosted its first PR 3v3 Nationals, won by Team Rodríguez.

== National teams ==
=== Adult ===
- Puerto Rico men's national ice hockey team
- Puerto Rico women's national ice hockey team

=== Youth ===
- Puerto Rico men's national junior ice hockey team

=== Performance ===
- Puerto Rico national ice hockey team results
