= IBSF World Championships 2020 – Two-man =

Two-man at the IBSF World Championships 2020
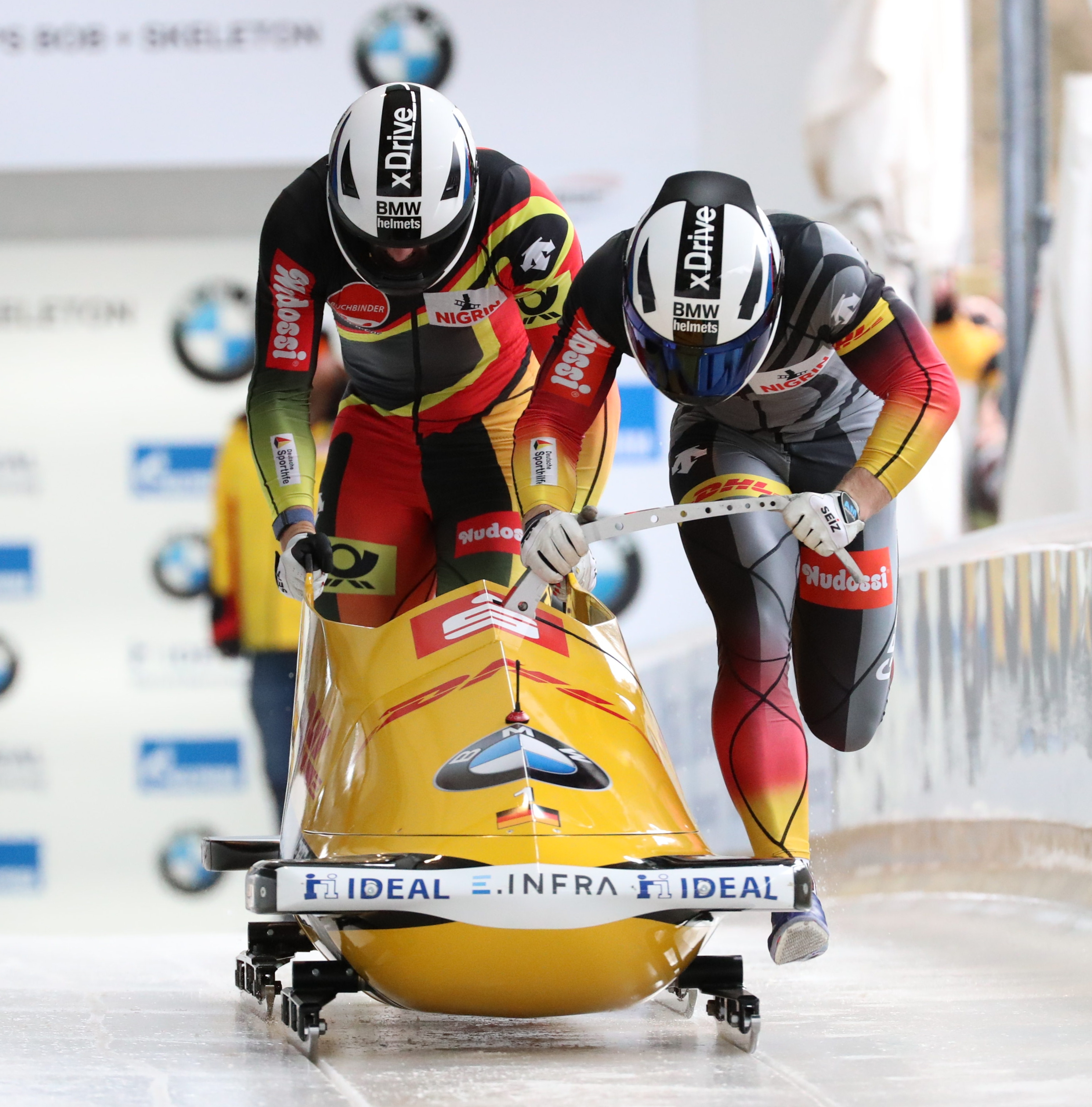
- Venue: Altenberg bobsleigh, luge, and skeleton track
- Location: Altenberg, Germany
- Dates: 22–23 February
- Competitors: 54 from 16 nations
- Teams: 27
- Winning time: 3:40.44

Medalists
gold medal	Francesco Friedrich; Thorsten Margis	Germany
silver medal	Johannes Lochner; Christopher Weber	Germany
bronze medal	Oskars Ķibermanis; Matīss Miknis	Latvia

The Two-man competition at the IBSF World Championships 2020 was held on the 22nd and 23rd February 2020.

== Results ==
The first two runs were started on February 22 at 11:30am. The last two runs were held on February 23 at 2:30pm.

Rank	Bib	Country	Athletes	Run 1	Rank	Run 2	Rank	Run 3	Rank	Run 4	Rank	Total	Behind
1st place, gold medalist(s)	4	Germany	Francesco Friedrich; Thorsten Margis	54.00	1	54.09	1	55.98	1	56.37	1	3:40.44	
2nd place, silver medalist(s)	22	Germany	Johannes Lochner; Christopher Weber	54.59	5	54.59	3	56.36	3	56.55	8	3:42.09	+1.65
3rd place, bronze medalist(s)	5	Latvia	Oskars Ķibermanis; Matīss Miknis	54.49	2	54.72	6	56.35	2	56.67	14	3:42.23	+1.79
4	20	Germany	Nico Walther; Eric Franke	54.54	4	54.49	2	56.36	3	56.92	19	3:42.31	+1.87
5	10	Germany	Richard Oelsner; Malte Schwenzfeier	54.52	3	54.67	5	56.49	5	57.03	20	3:42.71	+2.27
6	18	Austria	Benjamin Maier; Markus Sammer	54.91	11	54.61	4	56.58	7	56.66	13	3:42.76	+2.32
7	15	Switzerland	Simon Friedli; Gregory Jones	54.73	8	55.14	17	56.52	6	56.44	4	3:42.83	+2.39
8	7	Switzerland	Michael Vogt; Sandro Michel	54.77	9	54.78	7	56.80	10	56.55	8	3:42.90	+2.46
9	9	France	Romain Heinrich; Dorian Hauterville	54.90	10	54.93	12	56.70	8	56.43	3	3:42.96	+2.52
10	2	Romania	Mihai Cristian Tentea; Nicolae Ciprian Daroczi	54.60	6	54.86	10	56.87	11	56.76	17	3:43.09	+2.65
11	6	Canada	Justin Kripps; Cameron Stones	54.60	6	55.00	13	56.77	9	56.81	18	3:43.18	+2.74
12	17	Latvia	Oskars Melbārdis; Intars Dambis	55.05	17	54.84	9	56.97	13	56.44	4	3:43.30	+2.86
13	12	Russia	Alexey Stulnev; Ilya Malykh	54.91	11	54.92	11	56.87	11	56.71	16	3:43.41	+2.97
14	16	Czech Republic	Dominik Dvořák; Jakub Nosek	54.98	16	54.81	8	57.13	15	56.54	6	3:43.46	+3.02
14	11	South Korea	Won Yun-jong; Chae Byung-do	54.95	14	55.02	14	57.10	14	56.39	2	3:43.46	+3.02
16	8	Great Britain	Brad Hall; Greg Cackett	54.92	13	55.20	18	57.32	17	56.54	6	3:43.98	+3.54
17	3	Latvia	Ralfs Bērziņš; Davis Springis	54.97	15	55.06	16	57.47	19	56.58	11	3:44.08	+3.64
18	23	Austria	Markus Treichl; Kristian Huber	55.18	18	55.04	15	57.41	18	56.59	12	3:44.22	+3.78
19	13	United States	Hunter Church; Joshua Williamson	55.25	20	55.50	20	57.17	16	56.57	10	3:44.49	+4.05
20	24	Italy	Patrick Baumgartner; Costantino Ughi	55.30	21	55.44	19	58.62	21	56.70	15	3:45.10	+4.66
21	21	China	Li Chunjian; Shi Hao	55.47	22	55.72	21	57.49	20	Did not advance			
22	19	Netherlands	Ivo de Bruin; Dennis Veenker	55.49	23	55.83	23	58.28	22	Did not advance			
23	1	Japan	Ryo Shinohara; Yoshiki Kaneko	55.52	24	56.03	24	58.64	24	Did not advance			
24	26	Great Britain	Lamin Deen; Ben Simons	55.85	26	56.07	25	58.62	23	Did not advance			
25	25	Italy	Mattia Variola; Alex Verginer	56.85	27	56.23	26	58.91	25	Did not advance			
–	14	Russia	Rostislav Gaitiukevich; Ruslan Samitov	55.23	19	1:00.30	27	Did not start					
–	27	China	Jin Jian; Wu Qingze	55.57	25	55.75	22	Did not start					
