= Lebanon women's national ice hockey team =

National ice hockey team representing Lebanon

Lebanon
- The Lebanese cedar is the badge used on the players jerseys.
- Association: Lebanese Ice Hockey Federation
- Most games: Several players (5)
- Top scorer: Ava Eid (5)
- Most points: Ava Eid (8)
- Team colors
- IIHF code: LIB

Ranking
- Current IIHF: NR (3 June 2026)

First international
- Colombia 1–0 Lebanon (Coral Springs, United States; 14 October 2021)

Biggest win
- Lebanon 10–0 Puerto Rico (Chicago, United States; 21 April 2024)

Biggest defeat
- Colombia 1–0 Lebanon (Coral Springs, United States; 14 October 2021); Puerto Rico 5–4 Lebanon (Coral Springs, United States; 15 October 2021)

International record (W–L–T)
- 1–2–0

The Lebanon women's national ice hockey team (Arabic: منتخب لبنان لهوكي الجليد للسيدات; French: Équipe du Liban féminine de hockey sur glace) is the national women's ice hockey team of Lebanon. The team is controlled by the Lebanese Ice Hockey Federation, and on 26 September 2019, became an associate member of the International Ice Hockey Federation (IIHF).
