= Chile women's national ice hockey team =

Chile
- Nickname: Condors
- Association: Federación Chilena de Hockey en Línea y en Hielo
- Head coach: Kaitline Harrington
- Captain: Maria Law
- Most games: Several players (10)
- Top scorer: Lee Carmen (11)
- Most points: Lee Carmen (19)
- Team colors
- IIHF code: CHI

Ranking
- Current IIHF: ▲ (21 April 2025)

First international
- Puerto Rico 7–3 Chile (Coral Springs, United States; 14 October 2021)

Biggest win
- Chile 8–2 Argentina (Coral Springs, United States; 16 September 2022)

Biggest defeat
- Colombia 6–1 Chile (Coral Springs, United States; 15 October 2021); Lebanon 6–1 Chile (Coral Springs, United States; 16 October 2021); Colombia 9–4 Chile (Coral Springs, United States; 24 August 2023)

International record (W–L–T)
- 3–3–1

The Chile women's national ice hockey team (Spanish: Selección femenina de hockey sobre hielo de Chile) is the national women's ice hockey team of Chile and is controlled by the Chilean Ice and Inline Hockey Federation. Chile is currently not ranked in the IIHF World Ranking and has not entered in any IIHF World Championship events.

== Players ==
=== Current squad ===
These players were called up for the 2024 Amerigol Latam Cup.

==== Goalies ====
- 24 - Daniela Schalchli
- 83 - Paula Cifuentes

==== Field players ====
- 5 - Jayla Quiroga
- 6 - Maria Law
- 7 - Abigail Muñoz
- 8 - Ashley Wahlstrom
- 10 - Zoe Quezada
- 16 - Katie Leffler
- 17 - Gianna Leffler
- 19 - Mandy Manopla
- 21 - Ileanna Quintero
- 56 - Tonya Williams
