= Carlos Méndez =

Carlos Méndez may refer to:

- Carlos Méndez (judoka) (born 1972), Puerto Rican judoka
- Carlos Alberto Méndez Castillo (born 1974), Venezuelan baseball player
- Carlos Johnny Méndez (born 1960), member of the House of Representatives of Puerto Rico
- Carlos Méndez Martínez (born 1943), mayor of Aguadilla, Puerto Rico
- Carlos Méndez (general) (1947-2017), Colombian general
