= IBSF World Championships 2023 – Four-man =

Four-man at the IBSF World Championships 2023
- Venue: St. Moritz-Celerina Olympic Bobrun
- Location: St. Moritz, Switzerland
- Dates: 4–5 February
- Competitors: 84 from 12 nations
- Teams: 21
- Winning time: 4:19.61

Medalists
gold medal	Francesco Friedrich; Thorsten Margis; Candy Bauer; Alexander Schüller	Germany
silver medal	Brad Hall; Arran Gulliver; Taylor Lawrence; Greg Cackett	Great Britain
silver medal	Emīls Cipulis; Dāvis Spriņģis; Matīss Miknis; Edgars Nemme	Latvia

The Four-man competition at the IBSF World Championships 2023 was held on 4 and 5 February 2023.

== Results ==
The first two runs were started on 4 February at 13:04 and the last two runs on 5 February at 13:00.

Rank	Bib	Country	Athletes	Run 1	Rank	Run 2	Rank	Run 3	Rank	Run 4	Rank	Total	Behind
1st place, gold medalist(s)	9	Germany	Francesco Friedrich; Thorsten Margis; Candy Bauer; Alexander Schüller	1:05.08	1	1:04.75	1	1:05.05	3	1:04.73	1	4:19.61	
2nd place, silver medalist(s)	10	Great Britain	Brad Hall; Arran Gulliver; Taylor Lawrence; Greg Cackett	1:05.09	2	1:04.94	2	1:04.93	2	1:05.34	7	4:20.30	+0.69
2nd place, silver medalist(s)	2	Latvia	Emīls Cipulis; Dāvis Spriņģis; Matīss Miknis; Edgars Nemme	1:05.37	5	1:05.04	3	1:04.87	1	1:05.02	2	4:20.30	+0.69
4	8	Germany	Johannes Lochner; Erec Bruckert; Georg Fleischhauer (Runs 1-2); Kevin Korona (Runs 3-4); Joshua Tasche	1:05.31	3	1:05.36	5	1:05.35	7	1:05.02	2	4:21.04	+1.43
5	6	Switzerland	Michael Vogt; Silvio Weber; Cyril Bieri; Sandro Michel	1:05.36	4	1:05.68	10	1:05.31	6	1:05.03	4	4:21.38	+1.77
6	5	Germany	Christoph Hafer; Michael Salzer; Matthias Sommer; Tobias Schneider	1:05.61	7	1:05.35	4	1:05.23	4	1:05.28	6	4:21.47	+1.86
7	7	Austria	Markus Treichl; Sascha Stepan; Markus Sammer; Kristian Huber	1:05.75	9	1:05.40	7	1:05.24	5	1:05.27	5	4:21.66	+2.05
8	11	Germany	Nico Semmler; Marvin Paul; Oliver Peschk; Rupert Schenk	1:05.80	10	1:05.37	6	1:05.40	8	1:05.35	8	4:21.92	+2.31
9	3	Switzerland	Cédric Follador; Nicola Mariani; Dominik Hufschmid; Luca Rolli	1:05.68	8	1:05.55	8	1:05.40	8	1:05.63	10	4:22.26	+2.65
10	14	Italy	Patrick Baumgartner; Eric Fantazzini; Robert Mircea; Lorenzo Bilotti	1:05.47	6	1:05.70	11	1:05.57	10	1:05.68	12	4:22.42	+2.81
11	21	France	Romain Heinrich; Lionel Lefebvre; Thibault Demarthon (Runs 1-2); Thomas Delmestre (Runs 3-4); Jérôme Laporal	1:05.86	12	1:05.65	9	1:05.71	11	1:05.63	10	4:22.85	+3.24
12	16	Switzerland	Timo Rohner; Gregory Jones; Andreas Haas; Roman Wägeli	1:05.84	11	1:05.81	12	1:05.82	13	1:05.54	9	4:23.01	+3.40
13	4	Canada	Taylor Austin; Cyrus Gray; Davidson de Souza; Shaquille Murray-Lawrence	1:05.97	13	1:06.19	14	1:05.80	12	1:05.74	13	4:23.70	+4.09
14	15	China	Li Chunjian; Ding Song; Ye Jielong; Wu Qingze	1:06.40	16	1:06.07	13	1:06.22	17	1:05.99	14	4:24.68	+5.07
15	12	Czech Republic	Adam Dobeš; Michal Dobeš; Jáchym Procházka; Dominik Záleský	1:06.10	14	1:06.60	16	1:06.03	14	1:06.09	15	4:24.82	+5.21
16	13	Romania	Mihai Tentea; Ciprian Daroczi; Mihai Păcioianu; George Iordache	1:06.35	15	1:06.44	15	1:06.08	15	1:06.21	16	4:25.08	+5.47
17	18	Italy	Mattia Variola; Alex Pagnini; Fabio Batti; Delmas Obou	1:06.44	17	1:06.67	17	1:06.19	16	1:06.35	17	4:25.65	+6.04
18	19	United States	Geoffrey Gadbois; Carsten Vissering; Freddie Harris; Paul Rabic	1:06.59	18	1:06.72	18	1:06.72	20	1:06.39	18	4:26.42	+6.81
19	20	Czech Republic	Matěj Běhounek; David Bureš; Ondřej Hrazdil; Antonín Wijas	1:06.71	19	1:06.78	20	1:06.44	18	1:06.58	19	4:26.51	+6.90
20	17	Canada	Pat Norton; Kenny-Luketa M'Pindou; David Caixeiro; William Ashley	1:06.76	20	1:06.77	19	1:06.62	19	1:06.61	20	4:26.76	+7.15
	1	Latvia	Jēkabs Kalenda; Arnis Bebrišs; Lauris Kaufmanis; Krists Lindenblats	1:09.43	21	Did not start							
