= Edgars Nemme =

Latvian bobsledder

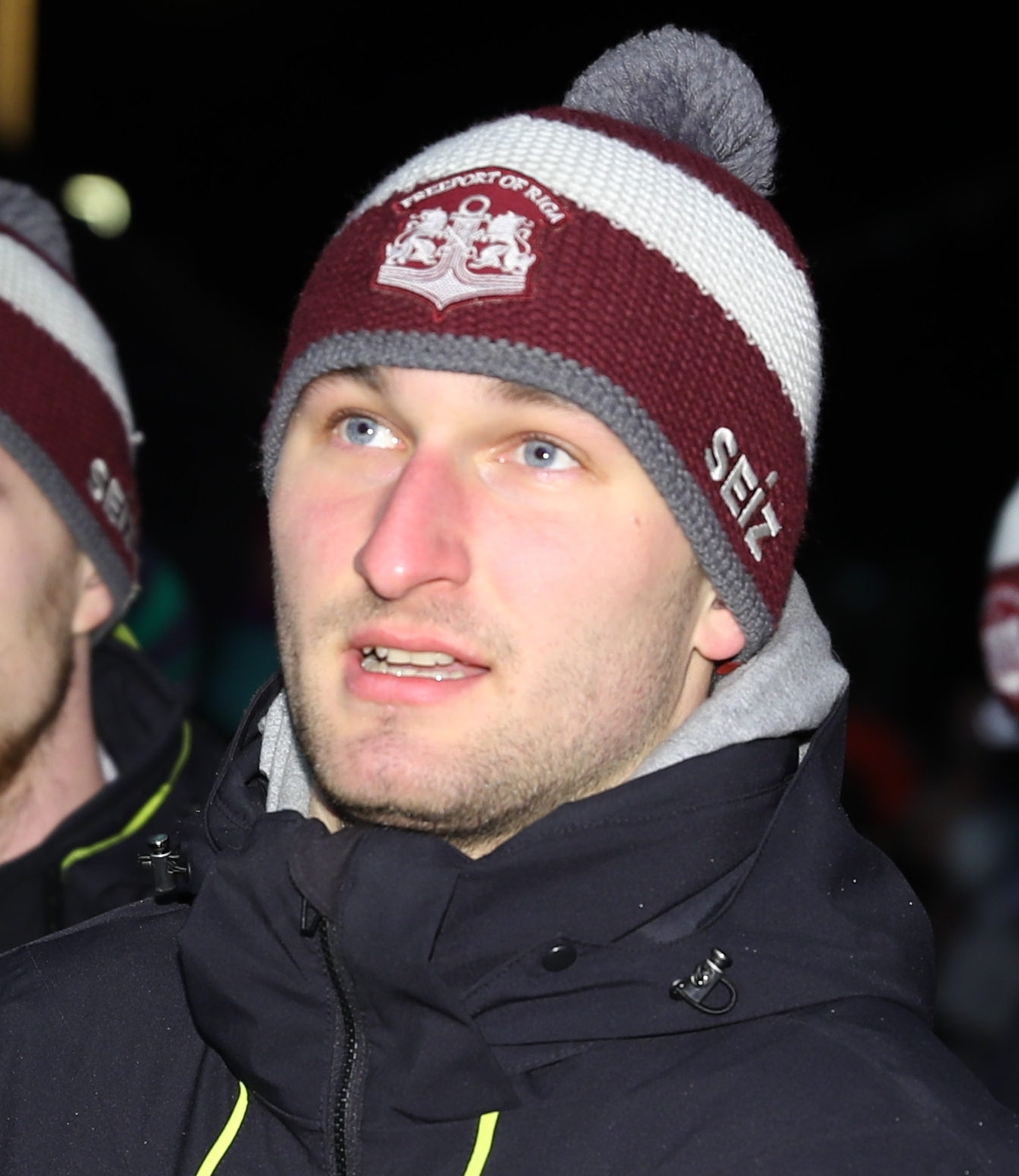

Personal information
- Nationality: Latvia
- Born: 9 June 1996 (age 30) Limbaži, Latvia
- Height: 193 cm (6 ft 4 in)
- Weight: 93 kg (205 lb)

Sport
- Sport: Bobsleigh
- Event(s): Two-man, Four-man
- Turned pro: 2018
Medal record
Men's bobsleigh
Representing Latvia
World Championships
| Silver medal – second place | 2023 St. Moritz | Four-man |
European Championships
| Gold medal – first place | 2022 St. Moritz | Four-man |

Edgars Nemme (born 9 June 1996) is a Latvian bobsledder who competed for Latvia at the 2022 Winter Olympics. He was part of the Latvian teams that won silver at the 2023 World Championships and gold at the 2022 European Championships in the Four-man event.
