= IBSF European Championships 2022 =

2022 European Championships
- Venue: St. Moritz-Celerina Olympic Bobrun
- Location: (Switzerland) St. Moritz
- Dates: 14–16 January

The 2022 IBSF European Championships were held from 14 to 16 January 2022 in St. Moritz, Switzerland.

== Medal summary ==
=== Medal table ===
Rank	Nation	Gold	Silver	Bronze	Total
1	Germany	3	5	2	10
2	Latvia	2	0	0	2
3	Netherlands	1	0	0	1
4	Austria	0	1	0	1
5	Russia	0	0	3	3
6	Italy	0	0	1	1
Totals (6 entries)		6	6	6	18

=== Bobsleigh ===
Event	Gold		Silver		Bronze	
Two-man	Germany; Francesco Friedrich; Thorsten Margis	2:11.76	Germany; Johannes Lochner; Florian Bauer	2:12.12	Russia; Rostislav Gaitiukevich; Mikhail Mordasov	2:12.21
Four-man	Latvia; Oskars Ķibermanis; Dāvis Spriņģis; Matīss Miknis; Edgars Nemme	2:09.38	Germany; Francesco Friedrich; Martin Grothkopp; Alexander Rödiger; Alexander Schüller	2:09.54	Russia; Rostislav Gaitiukevich; Mikhail Mordasov; Pavel Travkin; Aleksei Laptev	2:09.66
Women's Monobob	Mariama Jamanka; Germany	2:23.24	Laura Nolte; Germany	2:23.25	Nadezhda Sergeeva; Russia	2:24.26
Two-woman	Germany; Kim Kalicki; Lisa Buckwitz	2:15.50	Germany; Mariama Jamanka; Kira Lipperheide	2:15.54	Germany; Laura Nolte; Deborah Levi	2:15.57

=== Skeleton ===
Event	Gold		Silver		Bronze	
Men	Martins Dukurs; Latvia	2:14.39	Alexander Gassner; Germany	2:14.84	Christopher Grotheer; Germany	2:14.90
Women	Kimberley Bos; Netherlands	2:17.62	Janine Flock; Austria	2:18.36	Valentina Margaglio; Italy	2:18.48
