= Puerto Rico Ice Hockey Association =

Puerto Rico
- Association name: Puerto Rico Ice Hockey Association
- IIHF Code: PUR
- Founded: 2020
- IIHF membership: September 29, 2022
- President: Scott Vargas
- IIHF men's ranking: NR
- IIHF women's ranking: NR

The Puerto Rico Ice Hockey Association, abbreviated as PRIHA, is the governing body that oversees ice and inline hockey in Puerto Rico.

== History ==
The Puerto Rico Ice Hockey Association was founded in 2020, and was later accepted into the International Ice Hockey Federation (IIHF) on September 29, 2022 as an associate member. The organization is also part of the Puerto Rico Olympic Committee. Puerto Rico became the first territory of the United States and the sixth Latin American nation to join the IIHF. The current president of PRIHA is Scott Vargas.

There are currently no operational indoor ice rinks in Puerto Rico. The Aguadilla Ice Skating Arena, the only rink in the territory, has been permanently closed since 2017 due to damage caused by Hurricane Maria.

In February 18 of 2026, Arenales Summit in San Juan was opened as the first Inline hockey rink on the island. A new 4 team inline hockey league was formed, Boricua Liga. The league started with a Senior and Junior divisions.

=== NHL players of Puerto Rican descent ===
The only 2 notable players of Puerto Rican descent in the United States to have played in the NHL:

- (United States) (Puerto Rico) Boo Nieves, played in the National Hockey League (NHL) for 76 games in four seasons with the New York Rangers. (2016-2020)
- (Canada) (Puerto Rico) Nick Paul, played 227 games with the Ottawa Senators (2015-2021) and 259 games with the Tampa Bay Lightning. (2021-2026)
  Currently plays for the Toronto Maple Leafs.

Nieves and Paul are the only players of Puerto Rican descent to ever play in the NHL.

== Ice hockey statistics ==
- 406 players total
- 164 male players
- 157 junior players
- 85 female players
- 6 referees
- Currently no IIHF standard rinks
- Currently not ranked in the IIHF World Ranking

== National teams ==
- Men's national team
- Men's U20 national team
- Women's national team

=== Participation by year ===
2022

Puerto Rico was not a member of the IIHF and was not eligible to enter in any IIHF tournaments.

Event	Host nation	Date	Result
Amerigol LATAM Cup (Men's Division I)	United States	September 14–18, 2022	1st place
Amerigol LATAM Cup (U20)	United States	September 14–18, 2022	1st place
Amerigol LATAM Cup (Women's)	United States	September 14–18, 2022	4th place

2023

- Did Not Enter

2024

Event	Host nation	Date	Result
Amerigol LATAM Cup (Men's Division I)	United States	August 21–25, 2024	5th place
Amerigol LATAM Cup (U20)	United States	August 21–25, 2024	
Amerigol LATAM Cup (Women's)	United States	August 21–25, 2024	

2025

Event	Host nation	Date	Result
Amerigol LATAM Spring Classic (Men's)	United States	March 19–22, 2025	1st place
Amerigol LATAM Spring Classic (Women's)	United States	March 19–22, 2025	2nd place
IIHF Development Cup (Men's)	Andorra	April 22–26, 2025	1st place
Dream Nations Cup (Men's)	United States	May 28–June 1, 2025	5th Place
Dream Nations Cup (Women's)	United States	May 28–June 1, 2025	4th Place
Challenger Series (Men's)	Canada	July 10-15, 2025	4th Place

2026

Event	Host nation	Date	Result
Challenger Series (Men's)	United States	May 7-10, 2026	3rd place (2-3)
Challenger Series (Women's)	United States	May 7-10, 2026	5th place (0-6)

== Competitions ==
PRIHA organises Liga Boricua, the first inline hockey league on the island.

=== Teams ===
- Club de Hockey Coqui
- Club de Hockey Fortaleza
- Club de Hockey Gallito
- Club de Hockey Vejigante

=== Current title holders ===
Competition	Year	Champions	Title	Runners-up	Next edition
Men's Senior Division
Liga Boricua (inline)	2026	(Puerto Rico) C.H. Veijigantes	1st	(Puerto Rico) C.H Gallitos	2027
Boy's Junior Division
Liga Boricua (inline)	2026	(Puerto Rico) C.H. Coquis	1st	(Puerto Rico) C.H Veijigantes	2027
