= Emīls Cipulis =

Latvian bobsledder

Personal information
- Nationality: Latvian
- Born: 10 September 1995 (age 30) Latvia

Sport
- Sport: Bobsleigh
Medal record
Men's bobsleigh
Representing Latvia
World Championships
Silver medal – second place	2023 St. Moritz	Four-man
European Championships
Bronze medal – third place	2024 Igls	Four-man

Emīls Cipulis (born 10 September 1995) is a Latvian bobsledder. He competed in the two-man event at the 2022 Winter Olympics. He also competed in the two-man and four-man events at the IBSF World Championships 2023.

Cipulis won a silver medal in the four-man event at the 2023 World Championships, equalling the time of the British sled piloted by Brad Hall.

== Career results ==
=== Olympic Games ===
Event	Two-man
Representing Latvia
(China) 2022 Beijing	17th

=== World Championships ===
Event	Two-man	Four-man
Representing Latvia
(Switzerland) 2023 St. Moritz	6th	2nd
(Germany) 2024 Winterberg	6th	4th

=== Bobsleigh World Cup ===
==== Two-man ====
Season	Place	Points	1	2	3	4	5	6	7	8	9	10	11	12
2020–21	27th	216	SIG1 —	SIG2; 12	SIG3 —	SIG4 —	IGL1-1 —	IGL1-2 —	IGL2-1 —	IGL2-2 —	WIN —	STM —	KON —	INS3; 17
2021–22	24th	398	IGL1 —	IGL2 —	ALT1; 21	ALT2; 17	SIG1; 11	SIG2 —	WIN —	STM; 14				
2022–23	7th	864	WHI —	PAR —	LAK —	WIN; 7	ALT1; 6	ALT2; 7	SIG1; 4	SIG2; 8	—N/a			
2023–24	5th	1304	YAN; 5	LPG; 11	IGL; 6	STM; 5	LIL; 8	SIG; 8	ALT; 5	LAK; 8	—N/a			

==== Four-man ====
Season	Place	Points	1	2	3	4	5	6	7	8
2023–24	2nd	1529	YAN1; 4	YAN2; 4	LPG; 5	IGL; 3	STM; 3	LIL; 5	ALT; 1	LAK; 9
