= Carlos Méndez (general) =

Colombian Army general

General Carlos Alberto Méndez Nieto (Note: Spanish pronunciation: [ˈkaɾ.los alˈβeɾ.to ˈmen.des ˈnje.to]) (1947-2017) was a Colombian Army general and longtime commander of the Third Division. He served in the Colombian conflict.

== Childhood ==
Carlos Alberto was born to Carlos Enrique Méndez Hernandez (1919-2011) and Ana Maria Nieto Berrio (1917-1971) in the Cundinamarca Department.

== Career ==
He joined the Colombian Army in 1965 at 18. According to El Tiempo, under his command, 130 guerrillas and paramilitaries were killed or captured. Including during some operations against crime and drug trafficking.

== Assassination attempt ==
In March 2000, while serving as commander of the Army's Third Division, a military convoy carrying General Méndez was attacked by FARC guerrillas in western Valle del Cauca. He was part of a 12-member delegation of military personnel traveling between military bases near the Anchicayá reservoir. They were ambushed by the 30th Front of the FARC, which had makeshift dynamite explosives that they remotely detonated. Méndez and two other officers were wounded but survived as they were flown by helicopter to Third Division headquarters in Cali. He would carry shrapnel wounds from the FARC ambush for the rest of his life.

== Retirement and death ==
He was forced into retirement by the Pastrana government in November 2000. This was following the controversial resignation of General Jaime Ernesto Canal Albán in the face of the ELN's mass kidnappings in la vía Cali-Buenaventura, kilómetro 18 where 62 people were kidnapped. General Méndez was involved in the controversy due to his stance that military commanders had been unfairly blamed for the kidnapping. He ordered Canal to send documents to the Attorney General's Office and Inspector General's Office to prove that they had not been negligent. He himself speculated that this stance may have displeased some political authorities, suggesting to the media that his support for Albán may have made him politically inconvenient.

He passed away in 2017 and received a military funeral for his service.
