= Matīss Miknis =

Latvian bobsledder (born 1992)

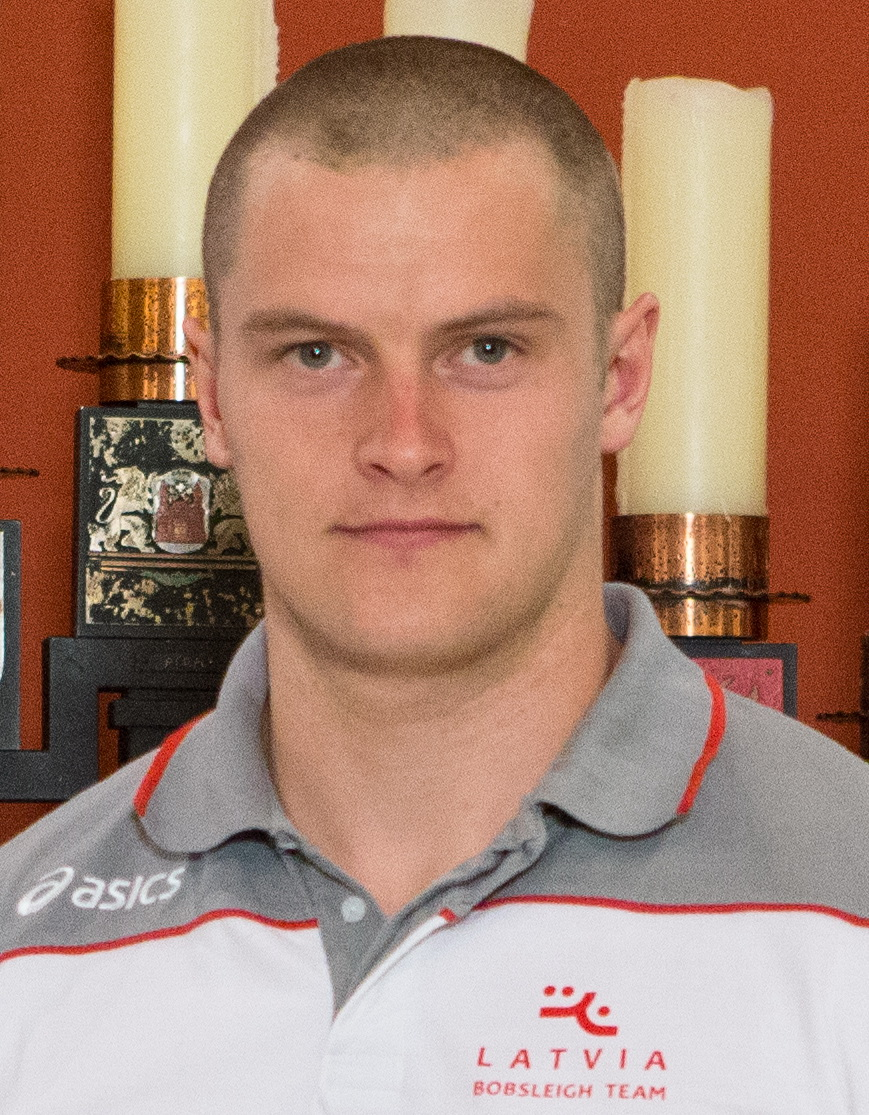
- Miknis in 2016

Personal information
- Nationality: Latvian
- Born: 29 December 1992 (age 33) Liepāja, Latvia
- Height: 1.89 m (6 ft 2 in)
- Weight: 97 kg (214 lb)

Sport
- Country: Latvia
- Sport: Bobsleigh
- Event(s): Two-man, Four-man
- Turned pro: 2014
Medal record
Men's bobsleigh
Representing Latvia
World Championships
Silver medal – second place	2019 Whistler	Four-man
Silver medal – second place	2023 St. Moritz	Four-man
Bronze medal – third place	2020 Altenberg	Two-man
European Championships
Gold medal – first place	2020 Sigulda	Two-man
Gold medal – first place	2022 St. Moritz	Four-man
Silver medal – second place	2019 Königssee	Four-man
Bronze medal – third place	2017 Winterberg	Two-man
Bronze medal – third place	2024 Igls	Four-man

Matīss Miknis (born 29 December 1992) is a Latvian bobsledder who competed for Latvia at the 2018 Winter Olympics.
