= Dāvis Spriņģis =

Latvian bobsledder (born 1996)

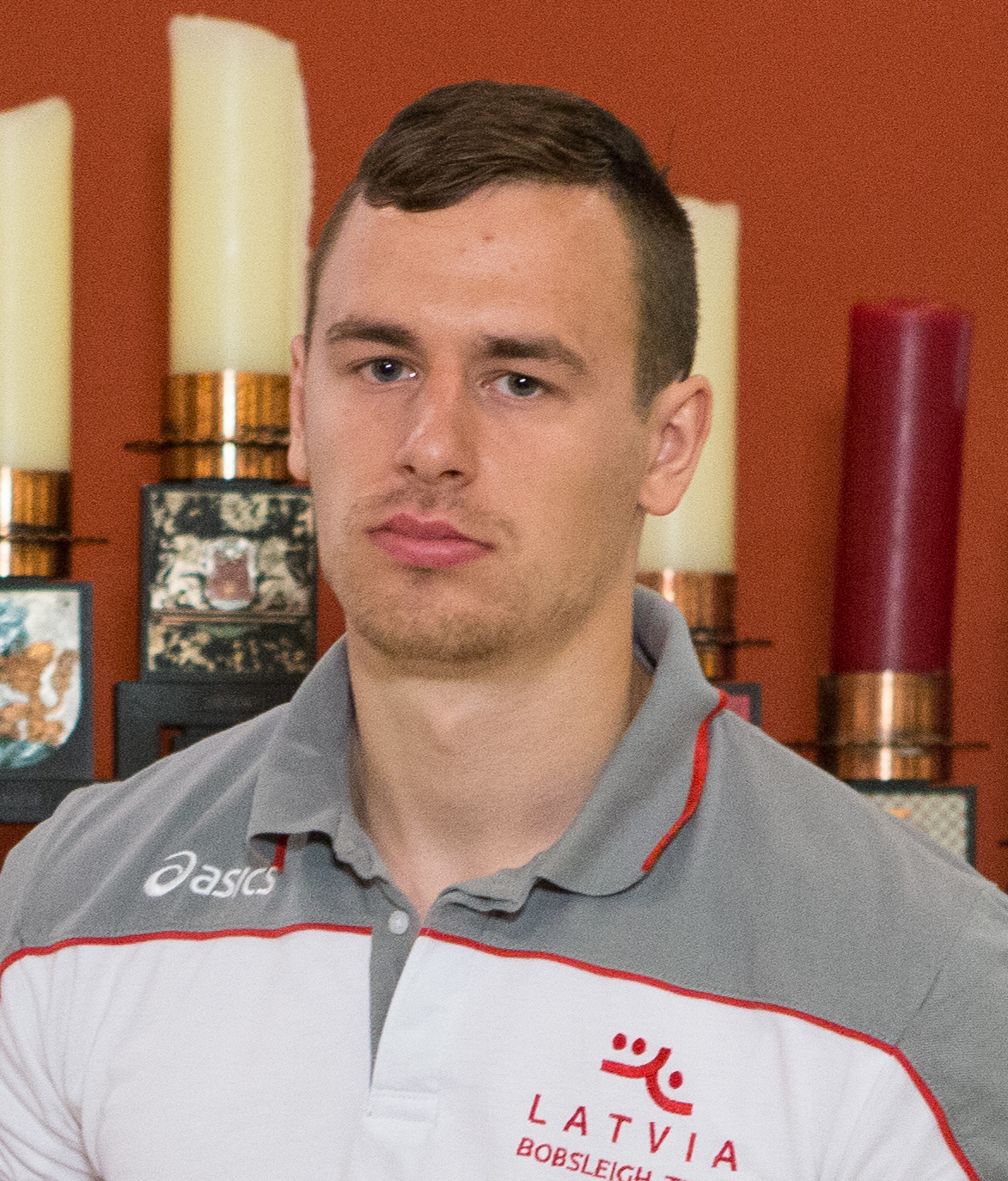
- Spriņģis in 2016

Personal information
- Born: 23 December 1996 (age 29) Tukums, Latvia
- Height: 1.90 m (6 ft 3 in)
- Weight: 98 kg (216 lb)

Sport
- Country: Latvia
- Sport: Bobsleigh
- Event(s): Two-man, four-man
Medal record
Men's bobsleigh
Representing Latvia
World Championships
Silver medal – second place	2023 St. Moritz	Four-man
European Championships
Gold medal – first place	2022 St. Moritz	Four-man
Bronze medal – third place	2024 Igls	Four-man

Dāvis Spriņģis (born 23 December 1996) is a Latvian bobsledder. He represented Latvia at the 2022 Winter Olympics.

== Career ==
In January 2022, Spriņģis competed at the IBSF European Championships 2022 and won a gold medal in the four-man event with a time of 2:09.38. This was Latvia's first gold medal in event at the European Championships since 2015. The next month he represented Latvia at the 2022 Winter Olympics and finished in fifth place in the four-man event with a time of 3:55.27.

In February 2023, he competed at the IBSF World Championships 2023 in the four-man event, and tied for silver with Great Britain. This marked the first time in World Championship four-man bobsleigh history a medal was tied, resulting in a double silver. He then competed at the IBSF European Championships 2024 and won a bronze medal in the four-man event with a time of 1:41.35.
