= Puerto Rico men's national junior ice hockey team =

Puerto Rico
- Association: Puerto Rico Ice Hockey Association
- IIHF code: PUR

IIHF World Junior Championship
- Appearances: 0

International record (W–L–T)
- 0-0-0

The Puerto Rico men's national under 20 ice hockey team is the national under-20 ice hockey team in Puerto Rico. The team represents the island at AmeriGol's events. The team has not entered in any World Junior Championship tournaments so far.

== Results ==
=== IIHF World Junior Championship ===
- 1979 - 2025 – Did not Enter.

=== AmeriGol LATAM CUP ===
- 2022 – 1st place
- 2023 – - place
- 2024 – - place

== Fixtures and results ==
Against other national teams
Opponent	Date	Score	Scores by period	Tournament	Host venue
Algeria	21 August 2024	2–7	No information	Amerigol Latam Cup	Baptist Health IcePlex, Fort Lauderdale, Florida
Venezuela	22 August 2024	2–2	No information	Amerigol Latam Cup	Baptist Health IcePlex, Fort Lauderdale, Florida
Brazil	23 August 2024	2–1	No information	Amerigol Latam Cup	Baptist Health IcePlex, Fort Lauderdale, Florida
Mexico	24 August 2024	3–2	No information	Amerigol Latam Cup	Baptist Health IcePlex, Fort Lauderdale, Florida

== Roster ==
Goaltenders
#	Player	Pos.	Catches	Height	Weight	Club
	--	G				(Puerto Rico) --- (-)

Defencemen
#	Player	Pos.	Shoots	Height	Weight	Club
	Andrew Horn	D	L	6'1	185 lbs	(United States) Danbury Jr. Hat Tricks (NAHL)
	Noah Rosado	D	R	5'9	175 lbs	(United States) Buckingham Browne & Nichols (USHS-Prep)
	Michael Ros	D	L	5'10	181 lbs	(United States) Florida Alliance South 18U AAA (18U AAA)

Forwards
#	Player	Pos.	Shoots	Height	Weight	Club
	Roberto Nabozny	(C/LW)	L	5'11	181 lbs	(United States) Carolina Jr. Hurricanes (USPHL)
	Yandell Vega	F	L	6'0	170 lbs	(United States) Charlotte Rush (USPHL)
	Andres Vidal	F	R	5'7	146 lbs	(United States) Florida Fury 18U AA (SFHL 18U AA)
	Dylan Wise	F	R	5'4	137 lbs	(United States) Florida Fury 18U AA (SFHL 18U AA)
