= Greg Cackett =

British bobsledder (born 1989)

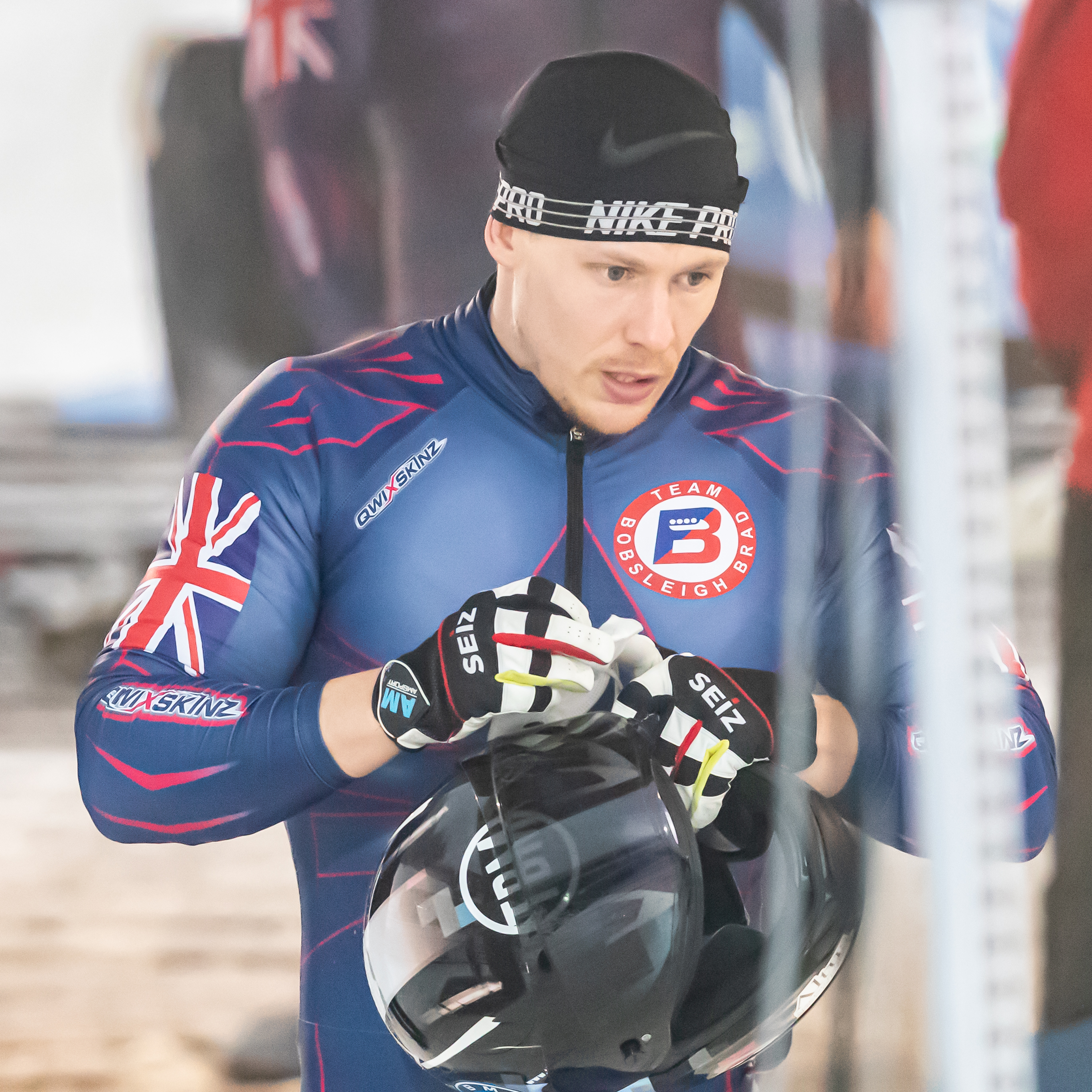
- Cackett in 2021

Personal information
- Nationality: British
- Born: 14 November 1989 (age 36) Redhill, Surrey, England

Sport
- Sport: Bobsleigh
Medal record
Men's bobsleigh
Representing Great Britain
World Championships
| Silver medal – second place | 2023 St. Moritz | Four-man |
| Bronze medal – third place | 2025 Lake Placid | Four-man |
European Championships
| Gold medal – first place | 2023 Altenberg | Four-man |

Greg Cackett (born 14 November 1989) is a British bobsledder. He competed in the four-man event at the 2018 Winter Olympics. In 2026, it was revealed that Cackett was planning a second career as a comedian.
