= Puerto Rico women's national ice hockey team =

Puerto Rico
- Association: Puerto Rico Ice Hockey Association
- Most games: Several players (10)
- Top scorer: Hannah Beckman (8)
- Most points: Hannah Beckman (9)
- Team colors
- IIHF code: PUR

Ranking
- Current IIHF: NR (3 June 2026)

First international
- Puerto Rico 7–3 Chile (Coral Springs, United States; October 14, 2021)

Biggest win
- Puerto Rico 7–3 Chile (Coral Springs, United States; October 14, 2021)

Biggest defeat
- Argentina 4–1 Puerto Rico (Coral Springs, United States; August 24, 2024)

International record (W–L–T)
- 5–5–2

The Puerto Rico women's national ice hockey team (Spanish: Selección femenina de hockey sobre hielo de Puerto Rico) is the national women's ice hockey team of Puerto Rico. The team is controlled by the Puerto Rico Ice Hockey Association and has been an associate member of the International Ice Hockey Federation (IIHF) since September 29, 2022.

== Puerto Rico women's national 3x3 team ==
The IIHF chose Brazil to host a women’s 3x3 tourney on October 17, for a tournament in November. Argentina, Colombia, Puerto Rico and Iran were announced as participants. The event would mark Puerto Rico's first ever IIHF event.

- 2024 Roster: Allegra Jenkins, Alyssa Jimenez, Eva Macci-Garcia, Jocelyn Modl, Liv Bernard, Maya Montalvo, Sabrina Honeycutt.

=== IIHF Women's 3x3 Series ===
Year	Host	Result	Pld	W	OTW	OTL	L
2024	Brazil	2nd	6	5	0	0	1
Total		0/1	8	3	0	0	5

== Fixtures and results ==
Against other national teams
Opponent	Date	Score	Scores by period	Tournament	Host venue
Lebanon	May 7, 2026	5–6	No information	Challenger Series	Fifth Third Arena, Chicago, Illinois
Lebanon	July 9, 2026	2–4	No information	Challenger Series	Sportplexe Pierrefonds, Quebec
Against club and other teams
Opponent	Date	Score	Scores by period	Tournament	Host venue
(Greece) Greek Heritage Team	May 8, 2026	3–4	No information	Challenger Series	Fifth Third Arena, Chicago, Illinois
(United States) Chicago Hockey Team	May 9, 2026	0–3	No information	Challenger Series	Fifth Third Arena, Chicago, Illinois
(Greece) Greek Heritage Team	July 10, 2026	1–12	No information	Challenger Series	Sportplexe Pierrefonds, Quebec
APNA Hockey Team	July 11, 2026	4–5	No information	Challenger Series	Sportplexe Pierrefonds, Quebec
Win Loss
