= 2010–11 Bobsleigh World Cup =

Winners
- Combined men's: Manuel Machata (GER)
- Two-man: Alexandr Zubkov (RUS)
- Four-man: Manuel Machata (GER)
- Two-woman: Sandra Kiriasis (GER)

Competitions
- Venues: 8

The 2010–11 Bobsleigh World Cup was a multi race tournament over a season for bobsleigh. The season started on 22 November 2010 in Whistler, Canada and ended on 27 January 2011 in Königssee, Germany. The World Cup was organised by the FIBT who also run World Cups and Championships in skeleton. This season was sponsored by Viessmann.

== Calendar ==
Below is the schedule of the 2010/11 season.

Venue	Date	Details
Whistler	25–27 November 2010	
Calgary	2–4 December 2010	
Park City	10–11 December 2010	
Lake Placid	18–19 December 2010	
Igls	14–16 January 2011	
Winterberg	21–23 January 2011	Also serves as FIBT European Championships
St. Moritz	29–30 January 2011	
Cesana	5–6 February 2011	

== Results ==
=== Two-man ===
Event:	Gold:	Time	Silver:	Time	Bronze:	Time
Whistler	Manuel Machata; Andreas Bredau; Germany	1:44.06 (52.07 / 51.99)	Lyndon Rush; Neville Wright; Canada	1:44.25 (52.13 / 52.12)		
Whistler	Manuel Machata; Andreas Bredau; Germany	1:44.06 (52.07 / 51.99)	Karl Angerer; Christian Friedrich; Germany	1:44.25 (52.27 / 51.98)		
Calgary	Karl Angerer; Gregor Bermbach; Germany	1:50.57 (55.07 / 55.50)	Manuel Machata; Andreas Bredau; Germany	1:50.77 (55.25 / 55.52)		
Calgary	Karl Angerer; Gregor Bermbach; Germany	1:50.57 (55.07 / 55.50)	Patrice Servelle; Lascelles Brown; Monaco	1:50.77 (55.28 / 55.49)		
Park City	Alexandr Zubkov; Dmitry Trunenkov; Russia	1:37.33 (48.95 / 48.38)	Simone Bertazzo; Sergio Riva; Italy	1:37.47 (49.15 / 48.32)	Manuel Machata; Andreas Bredau; Germany	1:37.67 (49.30 / 48.37)
Lake Placid	Simone Bertazzo; Sergio Riva; Italy	1:51.40 (55.61 / 55.79)	Alexandr Zubkov; Dmitry Trunenkov; Russia	1:51.44 (55.63 / 55.81)	Karl Angerer; Alex Mann; Germany	1:51.53 (55.53 / 56.00)
Igls	Beat Hefti; Thomas Lamparter; Switzerland	1:44.31 (52.21 / 52.10)	Alexandr Zubkov; Alexey Voyevoda; Russia	1:44.54 (52.30 / 52.24)	Simone Bertazzo; Matteo Torchio; Italy	1:44.97 (52.56 / 52.41)
Winterberg	Alexandr Zubkov; Alexey Voyevoda; Russia	1:52.21 (56.20 / 56.01)	Thomas Florschütz; Kevin Kuske; Germany	1:52.35 (56.16 / 56.19)	Karl Angerer; Alex Mann; Germany	1:52.44 (56.37 / 56.07)
St. Moritz	Manuel Machata; Andreas Bredau; Germany	2:12.27 (1:06.36 / 1:05.91)	Beat Hefti; Thomas Lamparter; Switzerland	2:12.30 (1:06.42 / 1:05.88)	Thomas Florschütz; Kevin Kuske; Germany	2:12.66 (1:06.58 / 1:06.08)
Cesana	Simone Bertazzo; Matteo Torchio; Italy	1:50.96 (55.43 / 55.53)	Beat Hefti; Thomas Lamparter; Switzerland	1:51.10 (55.65 / 55.45)	Thomas Florschütz; Kevin Kuske; Germany	1:51.11 (55.58 / 55.53)

Notes

- Note 1: Patrice Servelle's silver medal in the Calgary World Cup race was Monaco's first ever World Cup medal.

=== Four-man ===
Event:	Gold:	Time	Silver:	Time	Bronze:	Time
Whistler	Steven Holcomb; Justin Olsen; Steven Langton; Curtis Tomasevicz; United States	1:42.84 (51.48 / 51.36)	Maximilian Arndt; Rene Tiefert; Martin Putze; Alexander Rödiger; Germany	1:43.01 (51.59 / 51.42)	Manuel Machata; Andreas Bredau; Michail Makarow; Christian Poser; Germany	1:43.05 (51.54 / 51.51)
Calgary	Manuel Machata; Andreas Bredau; Michail Makarow; Christian Poser; Germany	1:47.99 (53.94 / 54.05)	Karl Angerer; Gregor Bermbach; Alex Mann; Christian Friedrich; Germany	1:48.19 (54.05 / 54.14)	Maximilian Arndt; Rene Tiefert; Martin Putze; Alexander Rödiger; Germany	1:48.23 (54.07 / 54.16)
Park City	Alexandr Zubkov; Filipp Yegorov; Dmitry Trunenkov; Nikolay Khrenkov; Russia	1:34.62 (47.35 / 47.27)	Manuel Machata; Andreas Bredau; Michail Makarow; Christian Poser; Germany	1:34.65 (47.52 / 47.13)	Lyndon Rush; Chris le Bihan; Cody Sorensen; Neville Wright; Canada	1:34.72 (47.46 / 47.26)
Lake Placid	Steven Holcomb; Justin Olsen; Steven Langton; Curtis Tomasevicz; United States	1:48.01 (53.70 / 54.31)	Maximilian Arndt; Rene Tiefert; Alexander Rödiger; Martin Putze; Germany	1:48.59 (54.23 / 54.36)	Lyndon Rush; Justin Wilkinson; Cody Sorensen; Neville Wright; Canada	1:48.63 (54.17 / 54.46)
Igls	Manuel Machata; Richard Adjei; Andreas Bredau; Christian Poser; Germany	1:42.92 (51.47 / 51.45)	Thomas Florschütz; Ronny Listner; Kevin Kuske; Andreas Barucha; Germany	1:42.97 (51.52 / 51.45)	Steven Holcomb; Justin Olsen; Steven Langton; Curtis Tomasevicz; United States	1:43.02 (51.47 / 51.55)
Winterberg	Manuel Machata; Richard Adjei; Andreas Bredau; Florian Becke; Germany	1:50.15 (55.29 / 54.86)	Thomas Florschütz; Ronny Listner; Kevin Kuske; Andreas Barucha; Germany	1:50.28 (55.10 / 55.18)		
Winterberg	Manuel Machata; Richard Adjei; Andreas Bredau; Florian Becke; Germany	1:50.15 (55.29 / 54.86)	Alexandr Zubkov; Filipp Yegorov; Dmitry Trunenkov; Nikolay Khrenkov; Russia	1:50.28 (55.27 / 55.01)		
St. Moritz	Edgars Maskalāns; Daumants Dreiškens; Uģis Žaļims; Intars Dambis; Latvia	2:09.34 (1:05.11 / 1:04.23)	Beat Hefti; Roman Handschin; Thomas Lamparter; Manuel Luethi; Switzerland	2:09.36 (1:04.93 / 1:04.43)	Manuel Machata; Andreas Bredau; Richard Adjei; Christian Poser; Germany	2:09.50 (1:05.04 / 1:04.46)
Cesana	Alexandr Zubkov; Filipp Yegorov; Dmitry Trunenkov; Nikolay Khrenkov; Russia	1:49.15 (54.42 / 54.73)	Edgars Maskalāns; Daumants Dreiškens; Uģis Žaļims; Intars Dambis; Latvia	1:49.22 (54.42 / 54.80)	Lyndon Rush; Justin Wilkinson; Cody Sorensen; Neville Wright; Canada	1:49.35 (54.57 / 54.78)

=== Two-woman ===
Event:	Gold:	Time	Silver:	Time	Bronze:	Time
Whistler	Sandra Kiriasis; Stephanie Schneider; Germany	1:47.70 (53.85 / 53.85)	Shauna Rohbock; Valerie Fleming; United States	1:47.99 (54.08 / 53.91)	Kaillie Humphries; Heather Hughes; Canada	1:48.17 (53.74 / 54.43)
Calgary	Cathleen Martini; Berit Wiacker; Germany	1:53.57 (57.01 / 56.56)	Sandra Kiriasis; Christin Senkel; Germany	1:53.89 (56.92 / 56.97	Helen Upperton; Shelley-Ann Brown; Canada	1:54.08 (57.11 / 56.97)
Lake Placid (Race 1)	Sandra Kiriasis; Berit Wiacker; Germany	1:53.94 (56.90 / 57.04)	Shauna Rohbock; Valerie Fleming; United States	1:54.31 (57.27 / 57.04)	Cathleen Martini; Kristin Steinert; Germany	1:54.58 (57.39 / 57.19)
Lake Placid (Race 2)	Sandra Kiriasis; Stephanie Schneider; Germany	1:54.08 (57.06 / 57.02)	Cathleen Martini; Christin Senkel; Germany	1:54.41 (57.08 / 57.33)	Helen Upperton; Shelley-Ann Brown; Canada	1:54.60 (57.34 / 57.26)
Igls	Shauna Rohbock; Valerie Fleming; United States	1:48.50 (54.45 / 54.05)	Anja Schneiderheinze; Christin Senkel; Germany	1:48.59 (54.43 / 54.16)	Fabienne Meyer; Hanne Schenk; Switzerland	1:48.70 (54.36 / 54.34)
Winterberg	Sandra Kiriasis; Berit Wiacker; Germany	1:55.06 (57.66 / 57.40)	Anja Schneiderheinze; Christin Senkel; Germany	1:55.55 (57.92 / 57.63)	Shauna Rohbock; Valerie Fleming; United States	1:55.66 (57.97 / 57.69)
St. Moritz	Sandra Kiriasis; Berit Wiacker; Germany	2:14.89 (1:07.57 / 1:07.32)	Anja Schneiderheinze; Christin Senkel; Germany	2:15.17 (1:07.76 / 1:07.41)	Cathleen Martini; Romy Logsch; Germany	2:15.54 (1:07.71 / 1:07.83)
Cesana	Helen Upperton; Shelley-Ann Brown; Canada	1:54.21 (56.99 / 57.22)	Esmé Kamphuis; Judith Vis; Netherlands	1:54.50 (57.17 / 57.33)	Sandra Kiriasis; Stephanie Schneider; Germany	1:54.52 (57.19 / 57.33)

Notes

- Note 1: The women's bobsleigh World Cup race scheduled for 10 December in Park City was cancelled due to blowing snow which prevented the timing eyes from working correctly. It was made up on 17 December in Lake Placid.

== Standings ==
=== Two-man ===
Pos.	Bobsledder	WHI	CAL	PKC	LKP	IGL	WIN	SMO	CES	Points
1.	Alexandr Zubkov (RUS)	4	6	1	2	2	1	4	5	1614
2.	Manuel Machata (GER)	1	2	3	6	4	5	1	15	1516
3.	Simone Bertazzo (ITA)	8	9	2	1	3	8	10	1	1476
4.	Steve Holcomb (USA)	7	4	7	4	6	9	7	6	1392
5.	Lyndon Rush (CAN)	2	5	9	5	10	11	5	4	1386
6.	Karl Angerer (GER)	2	1	dsq	3	8	3	5	12	1307
7.	Patrice Servelle (MON)	9	2	5	9	12	10	18	8	1210
8.	Gregor Baumann (SUI)	10	12	11	12	7	6	8	10	1184
9.	Alexander Kasjanov (RUS)	6	10	7	10	14	14	13	9	1128
10.	John Napier (USA)	—	11	6	7	18	12	15	11	928
11.	Beat Hefti (SUI)	—	—	—	—	1	4	2	2	837
12.	Alexey Gorlachev (RUS)	—	7	12	11	19	15	12	16	834
13.	Thomas Florschütz (GER)	—	—	—	—	4	2	3	3	802
14.	Maximilian Arndt (GER)	5	8	4	8	—	—	—	—	696
15.	Dawid Kupczyk (POL)	—	13	13	14	15	16	21	19	688
16.	Edgars Maskalāns (LAT)	—	—	—	—	11	7	17	7	560
17.	Jürgen Loacker (AUT)	—	—	—	—	9	13	11	—	408
18.	Edwin van Calker (NED)	—	—	—	—	16	17	16	13	400
19.	Ethan Albrect-Carrie (USA)	—	14	10	13	—	—	—	—	376
20.	Oskars Melbārdis (LAT)	—	—	—	—	17	—	9	14	352

=== Four-man ===
Pos.	Bobsledder	WHI	CAL	PKC	LKP	IGL	WIN	SMO	CES	Points
1.	Manuel Machata (GER)	3	1	2	6	1	1	3	11	1597
2.	Steven Holcomb (USA)	1	5	6	1	3	6	8	6	1522
3.	Alexandr Zubkov (RUS)	5	4	1	dsq	4	2	4	1	1420
4.	Karl Angerer (GER)	4	2	7	4	8	7	6	10	1410
5.	Alexander Kasjanov (RUS)	7	7	4	5	5	4	12	5	1400
6.	Lyndon Rush (CAN)	6	6	3	3	7	18	9	3	1352
7.	Simone Bertazzo (ITA)	8	12	9	8	12	11	15	9	1120
8.	Patrice Servelle (MON)	9	8	8	—	9	12	18	14	944
9.	Gregor Baumann (SUI)	—	11	12	—	6	8	7	8	928
10.	Alexey Gorlachev (RUS)	—	10	10	9	17	14	11	12	904
11.	John Napier (USA)	—	9	11	7	15	13	16	13	896
12.	Maximilian Arndt (GER)	2	3	5	2	—	—	—	—	804
13.	Thomas Florschütz (GER)	—	—	—	—	2	2	5	4	796
14.	Edgars Maskalāns (LAT)	—	—	—	—	10	5	1	2	763
15.	Beat Hefti (SUI)	—	—	—	—	11	9	2	6	674
16.	Dawid Kupczyk (POL)	—	13	13	—	14	dsq	14	15	568
17.	Milan Jagnešák (SVK)	10	15	14	—	—	—	19	19	508
18.	Jan Vrba (CZE)	—	—	—	—	13	10	13	—	384
19.	Ethan Albrecht-Carrie (USA)	—	14	15	10	—	—	—	—	360
20.	Jürgen Loacker (AUT)	—	—	—	—	18	15	10	—	328

=== Two-woman ===
Pos.	Bobsledder	WHI	CAL	LKP1	LKP2	IGL	WIN	SMO	CES	Points
1.	Sandra Kiriasis (GER)	1	2	1	1	6	1	1	3	1711
2.	Cathleen Martini (GER)	4	1	3	2	6	5	3	6	1563
3.	Kaillie Humphries (CAN)	3	4	8	9	8	8	4	5	1400
4.	Shauna Rohbock (USA)	2	8	2	dnf	1	3	7	4	1365
5.	Helen Upperton (CAN)	—	3	4	3	4	7	5	1	1361
6.	Esme Kamphuis (NED)	7	10	7	7	12	4	6	2	1354
7.	Fabienne Meyer (SUI)	8	7	6	4	3	13	11	7	1320
8.	Bree Schaaf (USA)	6	6	5	5	—	—	13	9	992
9.	Anastasiya Skulkina (RUS)	5	15	9	12	14	12	10	dsq	952
10.	Anja Schneiderheinze (GER)	—	—	—	—	2	2	2	11	766
11.	Paula Walker (GBR)	9	9	10	10	9	—	—	—	744
12.	Sabina Hafner (SUI)	—	—	—	—	5	6	8	8	680
13.	Viktoria Tokovaya (RUS)	11	11	15	11	—	—	—	10	656
14.	Stefanie Szczurek (GER)	10	5	12	8	—	—	—	—	616
15.	Elfje Willemsen (BEL)	—	14	14	14	15	14	dns	—	552
16.	Christina Hengster (AUT)	—	—	—	—	10	10	12	12	544
17.	Mellissa These (CAN)	12	13	13	13	—	—	—	—	488
18.	Elana Meyers (USA)	—	—	—	6	11	9	—	—	464
19.	Olga Fyodorova (RUS)	—	—	—	—	13	11	9	—	408
20.	Jamie Greubel (USA)	—	12	—	—	—	14	14		352
