= 2011–12 Bobsleigh World Cup =

International bobsleigh competition

Winners
- Combined men's: Maximilian Arndt (GER)
- Two-man: Beat Hefti (SUI)
- Four-man: Alexandr Zubkov (RUS)
- Two-woman: Cathleen Martini (GER)

Competitions
- Venues: 8

The 2011–12 Bobsleigh World Cup is a multi race tournament over a season for bobsleigh. The season started on 2 December 2011 in Igls, Austria and ended on 11 February 2012 in Calgary, Alberta, Canada. The World Cup is organised by the FIBT who also run World Cups and Championships in skeleton. This season is sponsored by Viessmann.

== Calendar ==
Below is the schedule of the 2011/12 season.

| Venue | Date | Details |
|---|---|---|
| (Austria) Igls | 2–4 December 2011 | |
| (France) La Plagne | 9–11 December 2011 | |
| (Germany) Winterberg | 16–18 December 2011 | |
| (Germany) Altenberg | 6–8 January 2012 | Also serves as FIBT European Championship |
| (Germany) Königssee | 13–15 January 2012 | |
| (Switzerland) St. Moritz | 20–22 January 2012 | |
| (Canada) Whistler | 2–4 February 2012 | |
| (Canada) Calgary | 9–11 February 2012 | |

== Results ==
=== Two-man ===
| Event: | Gold: | Time | Silver: | Time | Bronze: | Time |
|---|---|---|---|---|---|---|
| Igls | Beat Hefti; Thomas Lamparter; Switzerland | 1:44.24 (52.20 / 52.04) | Thomas Florschütz; Kevin Kuske; Germany | 1:44.36 (52.33 / 52.03) | Steven Holcomb; Justin Olsen; United States | 1:44.42 (52.26 / 52.16) |
| La Plagne | Thomas Florschütz; Kevin Kuske; Germany | 1:58.50 (59.39 / 59.11) | Steven Holcomb; Steven Langton; United States | 1:58.85 (59.48 / 59.37) | Beat Hefti; Thomas Lamparter; Switzerland | 1:58.91 (59.53 / 59.38) |
| Winterberg | Thomas Florschütz; Kevin Kuske; Germany | 1:52.98 (56.81 / 56.17) | Beat Hefti; Thomas Lamparter; Switzerland | 1:53.22 (57.06 / 56.16) | Oskars Melbārdis; Daumants Dreiškens; Latvia | 1:53.43 (57.34 / 56.09) |
| Altenberg | Thomas Florschütz; Kevin Kuske; Germany | 56.26 | Maximilian Arndt; Marko Huebenbecker; Germany | 56.27 | Beat Hefti; Thomas Lamparter; Switzerland | 56.73 |
| Königssee | Beat Hefti; Thomas Lamparter; Switzerland | 1:39.91 (50.04 / 49.87) | Lyndon Rush; Jesse Lumsden; Canada | 1:40.21 (50.23 / 49.98) | Manuel Machata; Andreas Bredau; Germany | 1:40.33 (50.34 / 49.99) |
| St. Moritz | Maximilian Arndt; Marko Huebenbecker; Germany | 2:14.51 (1:07.59 / 1:06.92) | Beat Hefti; Thomas Lamparter; Switzerland | 2:14.67 (1:07.67 / 1:07.00) | Manuel Machata; Andreas Bredau; Germany | 2:14.94 (1:07.93 / 1:07.01) |
| Whistler | Lyndon Rush; Jesse Lumsden; Canada | 1:44.14 (52.04 / 52.10) | Maximilian Arndt; Martin Putze; Germany | 1:44.21 (51.95 / 52.26) | Beat Hefti; Thomas Lamparter; Switzerland | 1:44.36 (52.23 / 52.13) |
| Calgary | Beat Hefti; Thomas Lamparter; Switzerland | 1:50.14 (55.07 / 55.07) | Manuel Machata; Andreas Bredau; Germany | 1:50.15 (55.12 / 55.03) | Maximilian Arndt; Kevin Kuske; Germany | 1:50.40 (55.15 / 55.25) |

=== Four-man ===
| Event: | Gold: | Time | Silver: | Time | Bronze: | Time |
|---|---|---|---|---|---|---|
| Igls | Alexandr Zubkov; Filipp Yegorov; Dmitry Trunenkov; Nikolay Hrenkov; Russia | 1:43.05 (51.56 / 51.49) | Steven Holcomb; Justin Olsen; Steven Langton; Curtis Tomasevicz; United States | 1:43.11 (51.65 / 51.46) | Thomas Florschütz; Martin Rostig; Kevin Kuske; Thomas Blaschek; Germany | 1:43.41 (51.77 / 51.64) |
| La Plagne | Manuel Machata; Florian Becke; Andreas Bredau; Christian Poser; Germany | 1:57.00 (58.48 / 58.52) | Maximilian Arndt; Rene Tiefert; Jan Speer; Martin Putze; Germany | 1:57.24 (58.58 / 58.66) | Thomas Florschütz; Gino Gerhardi; Kevin Kuske; Thomas Blaschek; Germany | 1:57.26 (58.66 / 58.60) |
| Winterberg | Thomas Florschütz; Gino Gerhardi; Kevin Kuske; Thomas Blaschek; Germany | 1:50.52 (55.39 / 55.13) | Alexandr Zubkov; Filipp Yegorov; Dmitry Trunenkov; Nikolay Hrenkov; Russia | 1:50.54 (55.38 / 55.16) | Oskars Melbārdis; Helvijs Lūsis; Arvis Vilkaste; Jānis Strenga; Latvia | 1:50.65 (55.39 / 55.26) |
| Altenberg | Maximilian Arndt; Marko Huebenbecker; Alexander Rödiger; Martin Putze; Germany | 1:49.87 (54.73 / 55.14) | Alexandr Zubkov; Filipp Yegorov; Dmitry Trunenkov; Nikolay Hrenkov; Russia | 1:50.53 (55.16 / 55.37) | Thomas Florschütz; Ronny Listner; Kevin Kuske; Thomas Blaschek; Germany | 1:50.79 (55.17 / 55.62) |
| Königssee | Alexandr Zubkov; Filipp Yegorov; Dmitry Trunenkov; Maxim Mokrousov; Russia | 1:38.05 (49.22 / 48.83) | Manuel Machata; Marko Huebenbecker; Andreas Bredau; Christian Poser; Germany | 1:38.07 (49.24 / 48.83) | Maximilian Arndt; Jan Speer; Alexander Rödiger; Martin Putze; Germany | 1:38.19 (49.30 / 48.89) |
| St. Moritz | Maximilian Arndt; Jan Speer; Alexander Rödiger; Martin Putze; Germany | 2:10.51 (1:05.35 / 1:05.16) | Manuel Machata; Marko Huebenbecker; Andreas Bredau; Christian Poser; Germany | 2:10.72 (1:05.43 / 1:05.29) | Edgars Maskalāns; Daumants Dreiškens; Uģis Žaļims; Intars Dambis; Latvia | 2:10.75 (1:05.47 / 1:05.28) |
| Whistler | Alexandr Zubkov; Filipp Yegorov; Dmitry Trunenkov; Maxim Mokrousov; Russia | 1:42.46 (51.21 / 51.25) | Alexander Kasjanov; Denis Moiseychenkov; Maxim Belugin; Nikolay Hrenkov; Russia | 1:42.60 (51.32 / 51.28) | Lyndon Rush; Jesse Lumsden; Cody Sorensen; Neville Wright; Canada | 1:42.62 (51.32 / 51.30) |
| Calgary | Manuel Machata; Marko Huebenbecker; Andreas Bredau; Christian Poser; Germany | 1:47.72 (53.66 / 54.06) | Maximilian Arndt; Jan Speer; Kevin Kuske; Martin Putze; Germany | 1:48.00 (53.68 / 54.32) | Alexandr Zubkov; Filipp Yegorov; Dmitry Trunenkov; Maxim Mokrousov; Russia | 1:48.13 (53.73 / 54.40) |

=== Two-woman ===
| Event: | Gold: | Time | Silver: | Time | Bronze: | Time |
|---|---|---|---|---|---|---|
| Igls | Anja Schneiderheinze; Lisette Thöne; Germany | 1:47.26 (53.69 / 53.57) | Sandra Kiriasis; Petra Lammert; Germany | 1:47.44 (53.82 / 53.62) | Christina Hengster; Inga Versen; Austria | 1:47.82 (53.95 / 53.87) |
| Igls | Anja Schneiderheinze; Lisette Thöne; Germany | 1:47.26 (53.69 / 53.57) | Sandra Kiriasis; Petra Lammert; Germany | 1:47.44 (53.82 / 53.62) | Elana Meyers; Katie Eberling; United States | 1:47.82 (53.90 / 53.92) |
| La Plagne | Kaillie Humphries; Emily Baadsvik; Canada | 2:02.81 (1:01.63 / 1:01.18) | Cathleen Martini; Janine Tischer; Germany | 2:02.93 (1:01.79 / 1:01.14) | Fabienne Meyer; Hanne Schenk; Switzerland | 2:02.98 (1:01.75 / 1:01.23) |
| Winterberg | Cathleen Martini; Janine Tischer; Germany | 1:56.32 (58.20 / 58.12) | Anja Schneiderheinze; Lisette Thöne; Germany | 1:56.60 (57.88 / 58.72) | Fabienne Meyer; Hanne Schenk; Switzerland | 1:56.73 (58.20 / 58.53) |
| Altenberg | Cathleen Martini; Janine Tischer; Germany | 1:54.67 (57.45 / 57.22) | Sandra Kiriasis; Petra Lammert; Germany | 1:54.69 (57.49 / 57.20) | Fabienne Meyer; Hanne Schenk; Switzerland | 1:55.23 (57.69 / 57.54) |
| Königssee | Cathleen Martini; Berit Wiacker; Germany | 1:43.56 (51.86 / 51.70) | Kaillie Humphries; Emily Baadsvik; Canada | 1:44.10 (52.34 / 51.76) | | |
| Königssee | Cathleen Martini; Berit Wiacker; Germany | 1:43.56 (51.86 / 51.70) | Fabienne Meyer; Hanne Schenk; Switzerland | 1:44.10 (52.35 / 51.75) | | |
| St. Moritz | Anja Schneiderheinze; Lisette Thöne; Germany | 2:17.84 (1:09.31 / 1:08.53) | Cathleen Martini; Janine Tischer; Germany | 2:17.93 (1:09.30 / 1:08.63) | Sandra Kiriasis; Franziska Bertels; Germany | 2:18.05 (1:09.46 / 1:08.59) |
| Whistler | Kaillie Humphries; Emily Baadsvik; Canada | 1:46.68 (53.51 / 53.17) | Sandra Kiriasis; Berit Wiacker; Germany | 1:46.76 (53.54 / 53.22) | Helen Upperton; Shelley-Ann Brown; Canada | 1:47.09 (53.60 / 53.49) |
| Calgary | Kaillie Humphries; Jennifer Ciochetti; Canada | 1:53.28 (56.62 / 56.66) | Anja Schneiderheinze; Lisette Thöne; Germany | 1:53.46 (56.72 / 56.74) | Sandra Kiriasis; Petra Lammert; Germany | 1:53.54 (56.75 / 56.79) |

== Standings ==
=== Two-man ===
| Pos. | Bobsledder | IGL | LPL | WIN | ALT | KON | SMO | WHI | CAL | Points |
|---|---|---|---|---|---|---|---|---|---|---|
| 1. | Beat Hefti (SUI) | 1 | 3 | 2 | 3 | 1 | 2 | 3 | 1 | 1695 |
| 2. | Maximilian Arndt (GER) | 7 | 4 | 4 | 2 | 6 | 1 | 2 | 3 | 1573 |
| 3. | Alexandr Zubkov (RUS) | 9 | 8 | 7 | 4 | 5 | 5 | 4 | 5 | 1416 |
| 4. | Lyndon Rush (CAN) | 6 | 5 | 6 | — | 2 | 6 | 1 | 4 | 1339 |
| 5. | Manuel Machata (GER) | 8 | 7 | 23 | 8 | 3 | 3 | 5 | 2 | 1332 |
| 6. | Oskars Melbārdis (LAT) | 4 | 9 | 3 | 6 | 9 | 9 | — | 6 | 1200 |
| 6. | Gregor Baumann (SUI) | 10 | 12 | 10 | 7 | 4 | 7 | 14 | 10 | 1200 |
| 8. | Patrice Servelle (MON) | 5 | 15 | 8 | 16 | 7 | 8 | 7 | 9 | 1192 |
| 9. | Steven Holcomb (USA) | 3 | 2 | 13 | 5 | 10 | 4 | — | — | 1050 |
| 10. | Edwin van Calker (NED) | 12 | 10 | 5 | 18 | 11 | 14 | 13 | 11 | 1040 |
| 11. | Alexander Kasjanov (RUS) | 10 | 13 | 21 | 11 | 15 | 10 | 6 | 16 | 982 |
| 12. | Thomas Florschütz (GER) | 2 | 1 | 1 | 1 | — | — | — | — | 885 |
| 13. | Simone Bertazzo (ITA) | 14 | 22 | 12 | 20 | 16 | 11 | 10 | 14 | 852 |
| 14. | Nicolae Istrate (ROU) | 17 | — | 20 | 15 | 13 | 15 | 7 | 12 | 780 |
| 15. | Edgars Maskalāns (LAT) | 15 | 16 | 11 | 22 | 17 | 13 | — | 16 | 696 |
| 16. | John Napier (USA) | 18 | 11 | 14 | 17 | 12 | 16 | — | — | 640 |
| 17. | John James Jackson (GBR) | — | 14 | 18 | 14 | — | 22 | 12 | 19 | 562 |
| 18. | Nikita Zarharov (RUS) | — | — | 16 | 9 | 20 | 12 | — | 18 | 524 |
| 19. | Dawid Kupczyk (POL) | 22 | 19 | 27 | 21 | 19 | 21 | 16 | 22 | 518 |
| 20. | Uģis Žaļims (LAT) | 23 | 17 | 22 | 10 | 21 | 24 | — | 23 | 507 |

=== Four-man ===
| Pos. | Bobsledder | IGL | ALB | WIN | ALT | KON | SMO | WHI | CAL | Points |
|---|---|---|---|---|---|---|---|---|---|---|
| 1. | Alexandr Zubkov (RUS) | 1 | 5 | 2 | 2 | 1 | 4 | 1 | 3 | 1671 |
| 2. | Maximilian Arndt (GER) | 7 | 2 | 6 | 1 | 3 | 1 | 4 | 2 | 1606 |
| 3. | Manuel Machata (GER) | 6 | 1 | 7 | 5 | 2 | 2 | 6 | 1 | 1574 |
| 4. | Alexander Kasjanov (RUS) | 4 | 4 | 5 | 6 | 5 | 13 | 2 | 8 | 1418 |
| 5. | Oskars Melbārdis (LAT) | 8 | 10 | 3 | 7 | 4 | 8 | — | 4 | 1216 |
| 6. | Edgars Maskalāns (LAT) | 5 | 8 | 8 | 4 | 11 | 3 | — | 6 | 1208 |
| 7. | Steven Holcomb (USA) | 2 | 6 | 4 | 9 | 6 | 4 | — | — | 1098 |
| 8. | Lyndon Rush (CAN) | 13 | 11 | 20 | — | 8 | 7 | 3 | 5 | 1036 |
| 9. | Edwin van Calker (NED) | 11 | 7 | 9 | 7 | 18 | 11 | — | 7 | 1008 |
| 10. | Gregor Baumann (SUI) | 9 | 14 | 11 | 12 | 10 | 9 | — | 14 | 936 |
| 11. | Thomas Florschütz (GER) | 3 | 3 | 1 | 3 | — | — | — | — | 825 |
| 12. | Simone Bertazzo (ITA) | 15 | 20 | 12 | 15 | 19 | 21 | 5 | 16 | 820 |
| 13. | Dawid Kupczyk (POL) | 17 | 16 | DNS | 17 | 16 | 18 | 10 | 13 | 712 |
| 14. | John Napier (USA) | 12 | 13 | 15 | 16 | 13 | 12 | — | — | 696 |
| 15. | Jürgen Loacker (AUT) | 14 | — | 13 | 10 | 7 | 15 | — | — | 648 |
| 16. | Nicolae Istrate (ROU) | 20 | — | 18 | 14 | 17 | 22 | 11 | 15 | 644 |
| 17. | John James Jackson (GBR) | — | 15 | 19 | — | — | 14 | 8 | 10 | 594 |
| 18. | Jan Vrba (CZE) | 18 | — | 15 | 11 | 14 | 19 | — | — | 506 |
| 19. | Christopher Spring (CAN) | 10 | 9 | 10 | — | — | — | — | — | 440 |
| 20. | Nikita Zarharov (RUS) | — | — | 14 | — | 15 | 20 | — | 11 | 420 |

=== Two-woman ===
| Pos. | Bobsledder | IGL | ALB | WIN | ALT | KON | SMO | WHI | CAL | Points |
|---|---|---|---|---|---|---|---|---|---|---|
| 1. | Cathleen Martini (GER) | 5 | 2 | 1 | 1 | 1 | 2 | 4 | 5 | 1655 |
| 2. | Anja Schneiderheinze (GER) | 1 | 4 | 2 | 4 | 6 | 1 | 7 | 2 | 1598 |
| 3. | Sandra Kiriasis (GER) | 2 | 5 | 7 | 2 | 4 | 3 | 2 | 3 | 1574 |
| 4. | Fabienne Meyer (SUI) | 6 | 3 | 3 | 3 | 2 | 7 | 6 | 8 | 1490 |
| 5. | Kaillie Humphries (CAN) | 7 | 1 | 10 | DNS | 2 | 4 | 1 | 1 | 1389 |
| 6. | Anastasia Tambovtseva (RUS) | 9 | 9 | 8 | 7 | 7 | 5 | 5 | 10 | 1312 |
| 7. | Christina Hengster (AUT) | 3 | 7 | 5 | 6 | 11 | 6 | 13 | 11 | 1296 |
| 8. | Olga Fyodorova (RUS) | 8 | 6 | 6 | 12 | 9 | 16 | 9 | 9 | 1192 |
| 9. | Bree Schaaf (USA) | 12 | 11 | 9 | 5 | 15 | 14 | 8 | 7 | 1152 |
| 10. | Paula Walker (GBR) | 10 | 10 | 12 | 8 | 7 | 13 | 15 | 6 | 1144 |
| 11. | Astrid Radjenovic (AUS) | 13 | 14 | 16 | 9 | 10 | 10 | 10 | 13 | 1032 |
| 12. | Elana Meyers (USA) | 3 | 8 | 4 | — | 5 | 9 | — | — | 888 |
| 13. | Viktoria Tokovaya (RUS) | 14 | 12 | 14 | 11 | 14 | 12 | — | 14 | 840 |
| 14. | Jazmine Fenlator (USA) | 11 | 13 | 13 | — | 12 | 8 | — | — | 664 |
| 15. | Elfje Willemsen (BEL) | 15 | DNS | 15 | 13 | 13 | 15 | — | — | 552 |
| 16. | Eva Willemarck (BEL) | 17 | DNS | 18 | 15 | 16 | 18 | — | — | 448 |
| 17. | Carmen Tronescu (ROU) | 16 | — | 19 | 14 | 17 | 20 | — | — | 438 |
| 18. | Helen Upperton (CAN) | — | — | — | — | — | — | 3 | 4 | 392 |
| 19. | Eugenia Oana Diaconu (ROU) | 18 | — | 20 | 15 | — | 19 | — | — | 326 |
| 20. | Jennifer Ciochetti (CAN) | — | — | 11 | — | — | — | 12 | — | 264 |
| 20. | Jamie Greubel (USA) | — | — | — | — | — | — | 11 | 12 | 264 |

== See also ==
FIBT World Championships 2012
