= 2012–13 Bobsleigh World Cup =

International bobsleigh competition

Winners
- Combined men's: Oskars Melbārdis (LAT)
- Two-man: Lyndon Rush (CAN)
- Four-man: Alexandr Zubkov (RUS)
- Two-woman: Kaillie Humphries (CAN)

Competitions
- Venues: 9

The 2012–13 Bobsleigh World Cup was a multi race competition over a season for bobsleigh. The season started on 9 November 2012 in Lake Placid, United States and ended on 17 February 2013 in Sochi, Russia. The World Cup is organised by the FIBT who also run World Cups and Championships in skeleton.

== Calendar ==
Below is the schedule of the 2012/13 season.

Venue	Date	Details
(United States) Lake Placid	9–10 November 2012	
(United States) Park City	16–18 November 2012	
(Canada) Whistler	23–25 November 2012	
(Germany) Winterberg	7–9 December 2012	
(France) La Plagne	14–16 December 2012	
(Germany) Altenberg	4–6 January 2013	
(Germany) Königssee	11–13 January 2013	
(Austria) Igls	18–20 January 2013	
(Russia) Sochi	15–17 February 2013	

== Results ==
=== Two-man ===
Event:	Gold:	Time	Silver:	Time	Bronze:	Time
Lake Placid	Steven Holcomb; Steven Langton; United States	1:51.75 (55.56 / 56.19)	Cory Butner; Charles Berkeley; United States	1:52.35 (56.10 / 56.25)	Francesco Friedrich; Gino Gerhardi; Germany	1:52.44 (56.09 / 56.35)
Park City	Steven Holcomb; Curtis Tomasevicz; United States	1:37.40 (48.75 / 48.65)	Cory Butner; Charles Berkeley; United States	1:37.43 (48.85 / 48.58)	Francesco Friedrich; Gino Gerhardi; Germany	1:37.50 (48.78 / 48.72)
Whistler	Steven Holcomb; Steven Langton; United States	1:45.26 (52.54 / 52.72)	Lyndon Rush; Lascelles Brown; Canada	1:45.30 (52.57 / 52.73)	Francesco Friedrich; Jannis Bäcker; Germany	1:45.60 (52.64 / 52.96)
Whistler	Steven Holcomb; Steven Langton; United States	1:45.26 (52.54 / 52.72)	Lyndon Rush; Lascelles Brown; Canada	1:45.30 (52.57 / 52.73)	Alexandr Zubkov; Dmitry Trunenkov; Russia	1:45.60 (52.66 / 52.94)
Winterberg	Beat Hefti; Thomas Lamparter; Switzerland	1:51.01 (55.42 / 55.59)	Alexandr Zubkov; Dmitry Trunenkov; Russia	1:51.32 (55.60 / 55.72)	Lyndon Rush; Jesse Lumsden; Canada	1:51.41 (55.64 / 55.77)
La Plagne	Lyndon Rush; Jesse Lumsden; Canada	2:01.18 (1:00.63 / 1:00.55)	Beat Hefti; Alex Baumann; Switzerland	2:01.45 (1:00.65 / 1:00.80)	Steven Holcomb; Steven Langton; United States	2:01.48 (1:00.82 / 1:00.66)
Altenberg	Thomas Florschütz; Kevin Kuske; Germany	1:54.15 (56.96 / 57.19)			Manuel Machata; Christian Poser; Germany	1:54.76 (57.32 / 57.44)
Altenberg	Francesco Friedrich; Jannis Bäcker; Germany	1:54.15 (57.00 / 57.15)			Manuel Machata; Christian Poser; Germany	1:54.76 (57.32 / 57.44)
Königssee	Lyndon Rush; Jesse Lumsden; Canada	1:40.22 (49.98 / 50.24)	Oskars Melbārdis; Daumants Dreiškens; Latvia	1:40.60 (50.03 / 50.57)	Francesco Friedrich; Gino Gerhardi; Germany	1:40.72 (50.21 / 50.51)
Igls	Beat Hefti; Thomas Lamparter; Switzerland	1:45.04 (52.38 / 52.66)	Thomas Florschütz; Kevin Kuske; Germany	1:45.14 (52.41 / 52.73)	Francesco Friedrich; Jannis Bäcker; Germany	1:45.16 (52.44 / 52.72)
Sochi	Beat Hefti; Thomas Lamparter; Switzerland	1:53.76 (56.73 / 57.03)	Thomas Florschütz; Andreas Bredau; Germany	1:54.06 (56.89 / 57.17)	Oskars Melbārdis; Daumants Dreiškens; Latvia	1:54.16 (56.89 / 57.27)

=== Four-man ===
Event:	Gold:	Time	Silver:	Time	Bronze:	Time
Lake Placid	Alexandr Zubkov; Alexey Negodaylo; Dmitry Trunenkov; Maxim Mokrousov; Russia	1:50.15 (54.80 / 55.35)	Steven Holcomb; Justin Olsen; Steven Langton; Curtis Tomasevicz; United States	1:50.34 (54.95 / 55.39)	Nick Cunningham; Adam Clark; Andreas Drbal; Christopher Fogt; United States	1:50.47 (55.13 / 55.34)
Park City	Alexandr Zubkov; Alexey Negodaylo; Dmitry Trunenkov; Maxim Mokrousov; Russia	1:36.26 (47.95 / 48.31)	Steven Holcomb; Justin Olsen; Steven Langton; Curtis Tomasevicz; United States	1:36.38 (48.04 / 48.34)	Manuel Machata; Gregor Bermbach; Jan Speer; Christian Poser; Germany	1:36.40 (48.07 / 48.33)
Whistler	Alexandr Zubkov; Alexey Negodaylo; Dmitry Trunenkov; Maxim Mokrousov; Russia	1:43.29 (51.63 / 51.66)	Alexander Kasjanov; Maxim Belugin; Ilvir Khuzin; Nikolay Khrenkov; Russia	1:43.53 (51.65 / 51.88)	Christopher Spring; Timothy Randall; Adam Rosenke; Ben Coakwell; Canada	1:43.83 (51.78 / 52.05)
Winterberg	Alexandr Zubkov; Alexey Negodaylo; Dmitry Trunenkov; Maxim Mokrousov; Russia	1:50.06 (55.02 / 55.04)	Maximilian Arndt; Alex Mann; Alexander Rödiger; Martin Putze; Germany	1:50.25 (55.01 / 55.24)	Oskars Melbārdis; Daumants Dreiškens; Arvis Vilkaste; Intars Dambis; Latvia	1:50.41 (55.23 / 55.18)
La Plagne	Beat Hefti; Alex Baumann; Thomas Lamparter; Juerg Egger; Switzerland	1:57.92 (58.86 / 59.06)	Alexandr Zubkov; Alexey Negodaylo; Dmitry Trunenkov; Maxim Mokrousov; Russia	1:58.01 (59.07 / 58.94)	Alexander Kasjanov; Ilvir Khuzin; Maxim Belugin; Petr Moiseev; Russia	1:58.18 (59.14 / 59.04)
Altenberg	Maximilian Arndt; Marko Huebenbecker; Alexander Rödiger; Martin Putze; Germany	1:51.26 (55.21 / 56.05)	Manuel Machata; Alex Mann; Jan Speer; Christian Poser; Germany	1:51.32 (55.54 / 55.78)	Thomas Florschütz; Andreas Bredau; Kevin Kuske; Thorsten Margis; Germany	1:51.45 (55.49 / 55.96)
Königssee	Alexandr Zubkov; Alexey Negodaylo; Dmitry Trunenkov; Maxim Mokrousov; Russia	1:38.06 (48.91 / 49.15)	Maximilian Arndt; Marko Huebenbecker; Alexander Rödiger; Martin Putze; Germany	1:38.26 (48.97 / 49.29)	Thomas Florschütz; Andreas Bredau; Kevin Kuske; Thomas Blaschek; Germany	1:38.36 (49.09 / 49.27)
Igls	Maximilian Arndt; Marko Huebenbecker; Alexander Rödiger; Martin Putze; Germany	1:43.33 (51.70 / 51.63)	Beat Hefti; Alex Baumann; Thomas Lamparter; Juerg Egger; Switzerland	1:43.49 (51.80 / 51.69)	Thomas Florschütz; Andreas Bredau; Kevin Kuske; Thomas Blaschek; Germany	1:43.51 (51.71 / 51.80)
Sochi	Oskars Melbārdis; Daumants Dreiškens; Arvis Vilkaste; Intars Dambis; Latvia	1:52.29 (56.15 / 56.14)	Thomas Florschütz; Ronny Listner; Andreas Bredau; Thomas Blaschek; Germany	1:52.31 (56.01 / 56.30)	Alexandr Zubkov; Alexey Negodaylo; Dmitry Trunenkov; Maxim Mokrousov; Russia	1:52.43 (56.08 / 56.35)
Sochi	Oskars Melbārdis; Daumants Dreiškens; Arvis Vilkaste; Intars Dambis; Latvia	1:52.29 (56.15 / 56.14)	Thomas Florschütz; Ronny Listner; Andreas Bredau; Thomas Blaschek; Germany	1:52.31 (56.01 / 56.30)	Alexander Kasjanov; Ilvir Khuzin; Maxim Belugin; Kirill Antukh; Russia	1:52.43 (56.24 / 56.19)

=== Two-woman ===
Event:	Gold:	Time	Silver:	Time	Bronze:	Time
Lake Placid	Kaillie Humphries; Chelsea Valois; Canada	1:54.86 (57.20 / 57.66)	Jazmine Fenlator; Lolo Jones; United States	1:55.33 (57.51 / 57.82)	Elana Meyers; Tianna Madison; United States	1:55.34 (57.37 / 57.97)
Park City	Kaillie Humphries; Chelsea Valois; Canada	1:39.49 (49.61 / 49.88)	Sandra Kiriasis; Franziska Bertels; Germany	1:39.77 (49.70 / 50.07)	Cathleen Martini; Stephanie Schneider; Germany	1:39.81 (49.83 / 49.98)
Whistler	Kaillie Humphries; Chelsea Valois; Canada	1:48.68 (54.20 / 54.48)	Fabienne Meyer; Elisabeth Graf; Switzerland	1:49.37 (54.61 / 54.76)	Sandra Kiriasis; Berit Wiacker; Germany	1:49.50 (54.72 / 54.78)
Winterberg	Kaillie Humphries; Chelsea Valois; Canada	1:54.05 (56.94 / 57.11)	Elana Meyers; Katie Eberling; United States	1:54.15 (56.90 / 57.25)	Anja Schneiderheinze; Stephanie Schneider; Germany	1:54.19 (56.89 / 57.30)
La Plagne	Kaillie Humphries; Chelsea Valois; Canada	2:03.30 (1:01.55 / 1:01.75)	Jamie Greubel; Emily Azevedo; United States	2:03.57 (1:01.75 / 1:01.82)	Elana Meyers; Katie Eberling; United States	2:03.81 (1:01.79 / 1:02.02)
Altenberg	Cathleen Martini; Stephanie Schneider; Germany	1:56.95 (58.10 / 58.85)	Sandra Kiriasis; Franziska Bertels; Germany	1:57.25 (58.65 / 58.60)	Kaillie Humphries; Chelsea Valois; Canada	1:57.27 (58.35 / 58.92)
Königssee	Kaillie Humphries; Chelsea Valois; Canada	1:43.07 (51.40 / 51.67)	Cathleen Martini; Janine Tischer; Germany	1:43.49 (51.68 / 51.81)	Sandra Kiriasis; Berit Wiacker; Germany	1:43.61 (51.81 / 51.80)
Igls	Sandra Kiriasis; Franziska Bertels; Germany	1:48.65 (54.28 / 54.37)	Kaillie Humphries; Chelsea Valois; Canada	1:48.66 (54.20 / 54.46)	Jazmine Fenlator; Aja Evans; United States	1:48.70 (54.37 / 54.33)
Sochi	Sandra Kiriasis; Franziska Bertels; Germany	1:57.19 (58.16 / 59.03)	Elana Meyers; Aja Evans; United States	1:57.32 (58.33 / 58.99)	Kaillie Humphries; Chelsea Valois; Canada	1:57.33 (58.24 / 59.09)

== Standings ==
=== Two-man ===
Pos.	Bobsledder	LKP	PKC	WHI	WIN	LPL	ALT	KON	IGL	SOC	Points
1.	Lyndon Rush (CAN)	7	20	2	3	1	4	1	6	4	1656
2.	Oskars Melbārdis (LAT)	8	4	14	7	5	5	2	4	3	1602
3.	Manuel Machata (GER)	4	6	7	6	11	3	6	13	8	1504
4.	Steven Holcomb (USA)	1	1	1	5	3	—	8	14	12	1459
5.	Alexandr Zubkov (RUS)	9	6	3	2	10	—	4	7	4	1434
6.	Francesco Friedrich (GER)	3	3	3	—	—	1	3	3	10	1369
7.	Simone Bertazzo (ITA)	12	5	12	8	4	6	17	10	13	1320
8.	Cory Butner (USA)	2	2	10	9	12	—	12	5	9	1308
9.	Thomas Florschütz (GER)	—	—	—	4	6	1	5	2	2	1197
10.	Christopher Spring (CAN)	13	8	5	10	15	—	11	8	6	1184
11.	Beat Hefti (SUI)	—	—	—	1	2	—	7	1	1	1053
12.	Nick Cunningham (USA)	5	15	9	13	14	—	15	9	14	1040
13.	Rico Peter (SUI)	14	10	16	14	17	—	9	15	7	976
14.	John James Jackson (GBR)	23	9	15	14	8	11	19	21	16	946
15.	Justin Kripps (CAN)	15	14	12	12	16	—	10	11	18	928
16.	Alexander Kasjanov (RUS)	dsq	17	8	—	7	—	14	12	11	792
17.	Edwin van Calker (NED)	6	12	dns	20	9	—	23	20	15	746
18.	Jürgen Loacker (AUT)	17	19	18	17	19	10	25	18	22	724
19.	Loic Costerg (FRA)	20	18	19	—	21	8	21	16	19	676
20.	Ivo de Bruin (NED)	11	11	—	17	13	—	21	—	21	604

=== Four-man ===
Pos.	Bobsledder	LKP	PKC	WHI	WIN	LPL	ALT	KON	IGL	SOC	Points
1.	Alexandr Zubkov (RUS)	1	1	1	1	2	—	1	4	3	1727
2.	Oskars Melbārdis (LAT)	8	10	9	3	5	4	5	5	1	1625
3.	Manuel Machata (GER)	4	3	6	9	10	2	4	6	9	1594
4.	Maximilian Arndt (GER)	9	4	7	2	4	1	2	1	—	1574
5.	John James Jackson (GBR)	7	6	5	8	8	11	10	6	5	1488
6.	Steven Holcomb (USA)	2	2	4	6	7	—	7	17	11	1348
7.	Lyndon Rush (CAN)	6	12	8	13	19	6	9	10	18	1216
8.	Alexander Kasjanov (RUS)	13	7	2	—	3	—	6	14	3	1186
9.	Thomas Florschütz (GER)	—	—	—	4	9	3	3	3	2	1154
10.	Nick Cunningham (USA)	3	5	11	11	12	—	21	20	13	1034
11.	Jürgen Loacker (AUT)	15	15	15	12	13	8	14	21	15	998
12.	Rico Peter (SUI)	12	16	14	15	6	—	7	18	13	984
13.	Christopher Spring (CAN)	10	8	3	22	18	—	21	24	7	915
14.	Beat Hefti (SUI)	—	—	—	5	1	—	11	2	10	899
15.	Simone Bertazzo (ITA)	19	20	12	21	16	7	20	15	16	864
16.	Justin Kripps (CAN)	16	19	13	10	14	—	12	22	20	798
17.	Dmitry Abramovitch (RUS)	—	—	—	7	14	—	13	8	8	720
18.	Edwin van Calker (NED)	11	11	dns	20	20	—	16	13	17	712
19.	Jan Vrba (CZE)	14	17	20	—	—	5	—	12	19	654
20.	Francesco Friedrich (GER)	5	13	10	—	—	—	—	—	6	624

=== Two-woman ===
Pos.	Bobsledder	LKP	PKC	WHI	WIN	LPL	ALT	KON	IGL	SOC	Points
1.	Kaillie Humphries (CAN)	1	1	1	1	1	3	1	2	3	1960
2.	Sandra Kiriasis (GER)	5	2	3	9	4	2	3	1	1	1798
3.	Cathleen Martini (GER)	7	3	5	8	6	1	2	6	4	1691
4.	Anja Schneiderheinze (GER)	8	11	7	3	5	5	9	4	8	1536
5	Esmé Kamphuis (NED)	10	7	4	5	13	4	4	8	11	1488
6.	Elana Meyers (USA)	3	8	10	2	3	—	8	5	2	1468
7.	Fabienne Meyer (SUI)	13	10	2	6	9	9	5	11	5	1458
8.	Christina Hengster (AUT)	4	6	8	6	7	6	14	10	18	1384
9.	Paula Walker (GBR)	6	9	6	10	10	13	7	7	16	1344
10.	Jamie Greubel (USA)	9	4	11	4	2	—	11	9	9	1322
11.	Jazmine Fenlator (USA)	2	5	9	13	8	—	10	3	13	1290
12.	Olga Stulneva (RUS)	12	15	12	11	11	—	13	12	7	1048
13.	Jennifer Ciochetti (CAN)	11	12	13	12	12	—	17	14	6	1016
14.	Astrid Radjenovic (AUS)	15	14	14	15	17	7	14	17	15	992
15.	Anastasia Tambovtseva (RUS)	14	13	15	14	15	—	16	15	11	888
16.	Caroline Spahni (SUI)	—	—	—	18	14	8	6	13	10	792
17.	Elfje Willemsen (BEL)	—	—	—	16	16	10	12	18	14	656
18.	Maria Constantin (ROU)	—	—	—	17	—	11	18	19	—	378
19.	Ekaterina Kostromina (RUS)	16	16	16	—	—	—	dnf	—	17	376
20.	Eugenia Oana Diaconu (ROU)	—	—	—	20	—	12	19	20	—	338

== See also ==
- FIBT World Championships 2013
