= Manuel Machata =

German bobsledder (born 1984)

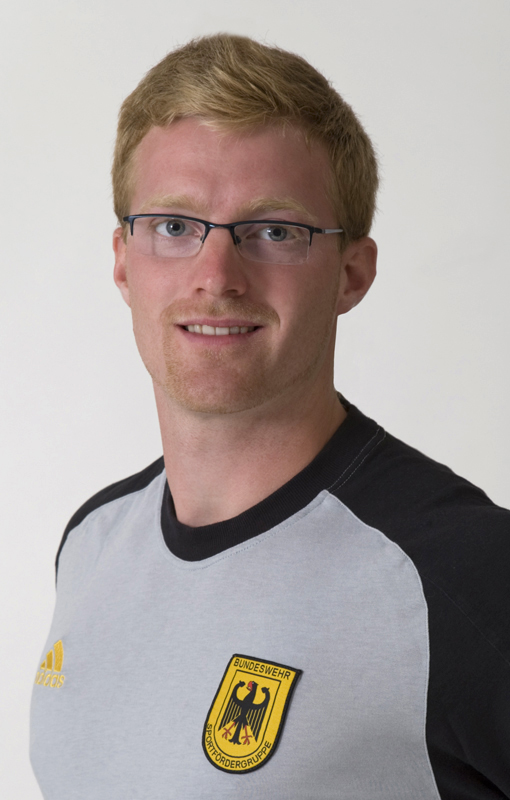

Personal information
- Nationality: German
- Born: 18 April 1984 (age 42) Berchtesgaden, Bavaria, West Germany
- Height: 5 ft 11 in (1.80 m)
- Weight: 220 lb (100 kg)
- Website: www.bobteam-machata.com

Sport
- Country: Germany
- Sport: Bobsleigh (pilot)
- Club: BC Stuttgart Solitude
- Turned pro: 2005
Medal record
Men's Bobsleigh
Representing Germany
World Championships
Gold medal – first place	2011 Königssee	Four-man
Silver medal – second place	2011 Königssee	Two-man
Bronze medal – third place	2012 Lake Placid	Four-man
World Cup Championships
Gold medal – first place	2010–11	Four-man
Gold medal – first place	2010–11	Combined
Silver medal – second place	2010–11	Two-man
Bronze medal – third place	2011–12	Four-man
Bronze medal – third place	2011–12	Combined
Bronze medal – third place	2012–13	Two-man
Bronze medal – third place	2012–13	Four-man
Bronze medal – third place	2012–13	Combined
European Championships
Gold medal – first place	2011 Winterberg	Four-man

Manuel Machata (born 18 April 1984) is a German former bobsledder who competed from 2005 to 2015.

Manuel Machata grew up in Ramsau near Berchtesgaden, Germany. He attended the CJD Christophorus high school in Berchtesgaden. After completing high school he joined the sports group of the German army (Bundeswehr). He became German Junior Champion in both two and four-man and Junior World Champion in four-man bobsled in 2006. Machata started regularly at the European Cup since November 2006 where he won the 2006 and 2007 cups at Königssee and 2007 the four-man in Igls. He was behind Thomas Florschütz in both two-man and four-man at Königssee 2007 and third in the 2008 two-man championships in Altenberg. He reached second place at the Junior World Championship 2009 at Königssee in both two and four-man bobsled. He decided the European Cup in 2009 for himself and secured his starting place for the 2010/11 World Cup after André Lange's retirement.

Although he was ranked below fellow German drivers Karl Angerer and Thomas Florschütz, he dominated the difficult track in Whistler in a surprise victory in the two-man bobsled with his brakeman Andreas Bredau in his World Cup debut. At the following World Cup stop in Calgary, he celebrated his maiden victory in the four-man race with his pushers Makarow, Bredau and Poser. On 20 February 2011 he won silver in two-man at the World Championships Königssee, finishing 0.18 seconds behind Alexsandr Zubkov from Russia. His crowning event was the four-man World Championships on 27 February 2011, where he finished first and became World Champion.

In March 2014 Machata received a 5,000 Euro fine and a one-year ban from the Bob- und Schlittenverband für Deutschland (BSD) after lending a set of bobsled runners to Russian bobsledder Alexander Zubkov in exchange for a fee. In October 2015 the BSD announced that Machata had retired from competition. The following month he was announced as the head coach of the Chinese bobsleigh team, following the awarding of the 2022 Winter Olympics to Beijing.
