= Uģis Žaļims =

Latvian bobsledder

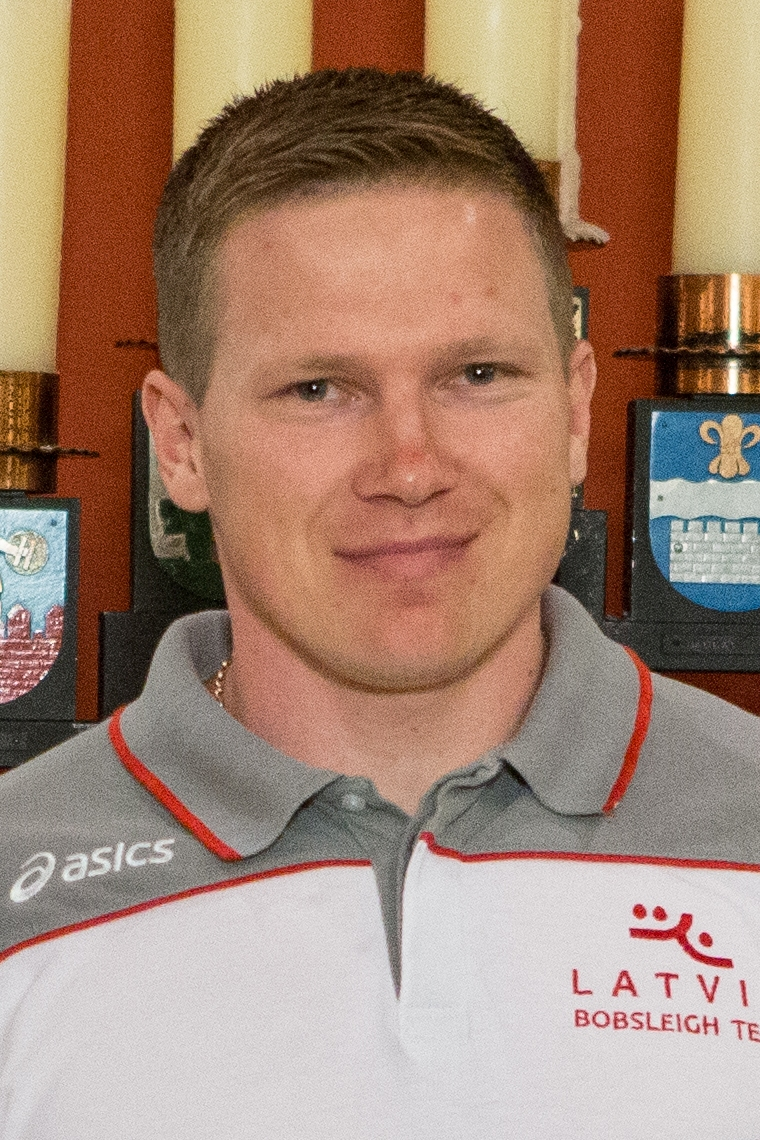
Uģis Žaļims in 2016

Uģis Žaļims (born 19 February 1986 in Saldus) is a Latvian bobsledder, both pilot and brakeman who has competed since 2008.

So far his highest achievements include a gold medal at the four-man 2010–11 Bobsleigh World Cup race in St. Moritz as well as tenth place as pilot at the two-man 2011–12 Bobsleigh World Cup race in Altenberg.
