= Richard Adjei =

German bobsledder (1983–2020)

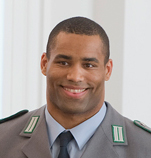

Personal information
- Nationality: German
- Born: 30 January 1983 Düsseldorf, West Germany
- Died: 26 October 2020 (aged 37) Düsseldorf, Germany
- Height: 1.90 m (6 ft 3 in)
- Weight: 106 kg (234 lb)

Sport
- Country: Germany
- Sport: Bobsleigh
- Turned pro: 2007

Achievements and titles
- Olympic finals: 2nd place, silver medalist(s)
Medal record
Men's Bobsleigh
Representing Germany
Olympic Games
Silver medal – second place	2010 Vancouver	Two-man
World Championships
Gold medal – first place	2011 Königssee	Four-man

Richard Adjei (30 January 1983 – 26 October 2020) was a German bobsledder who competed since 2007. He was also an American football linebacker.

== Bobsleigh career ==
His first World Cup event at Königssee, Germany earned him a win in the two-man event on 9 January 2010. Adeji won silver in the two-man event at the 2010 Winter Olympics in Vancouver as a pusher in tandem with driver Thomas Florschütz. He also won the gold medal in the World Championship four-man event at Königssee in 2011, as second brakeman in the bob piloted by Manuel Machata.

Adjei died on 26 October 2020 from a heart attack at the age of 37.

== American football career ==
Adjei was also an American football linebacker for Rhein Fire, Berlin Thunder in the NFL Europe and Düsseldorf Panther in the German Football League.
