= Matteo Torchio =

Italian bobsledder (born 1983)

Personal information
- Nationality: Italian
- Born: 13 December 1983 (age 41); Asti, Italy

Sport
- Sport: Bobsleigh

Matteo Torchio (born 13 December 1983) is an Italian former bobsledder. He competed in the two man and the four man events at the 2006 Winter Olympics.
