= Christian Friedrich (bobsleigh) =

German bobsledder (born 1981)

Personal information
- Born: 2 June 1981 (age 45)
- Height: 1.98 m (6 ft 6 in)
- Weight: 104 kg (229 lb; 16.4 st)

Sport
- Country: Germany
- Sport: Bobsleigh
- Turned pro: 2004
Medal record
Men´s Bobsleigh
Representing Germany
World Championships
Silver medal – second place	2011 Königssee	Four-man

Christian Friedrich (born 6 June 1981) is a German bobsledder who has competed since 2004. His best World Cup finish was second in the four-man event at Whistler in November 2010 and two-man event at Calgary in December 2010.
