= Christin Senkel =

German bobsledder (born 1987)

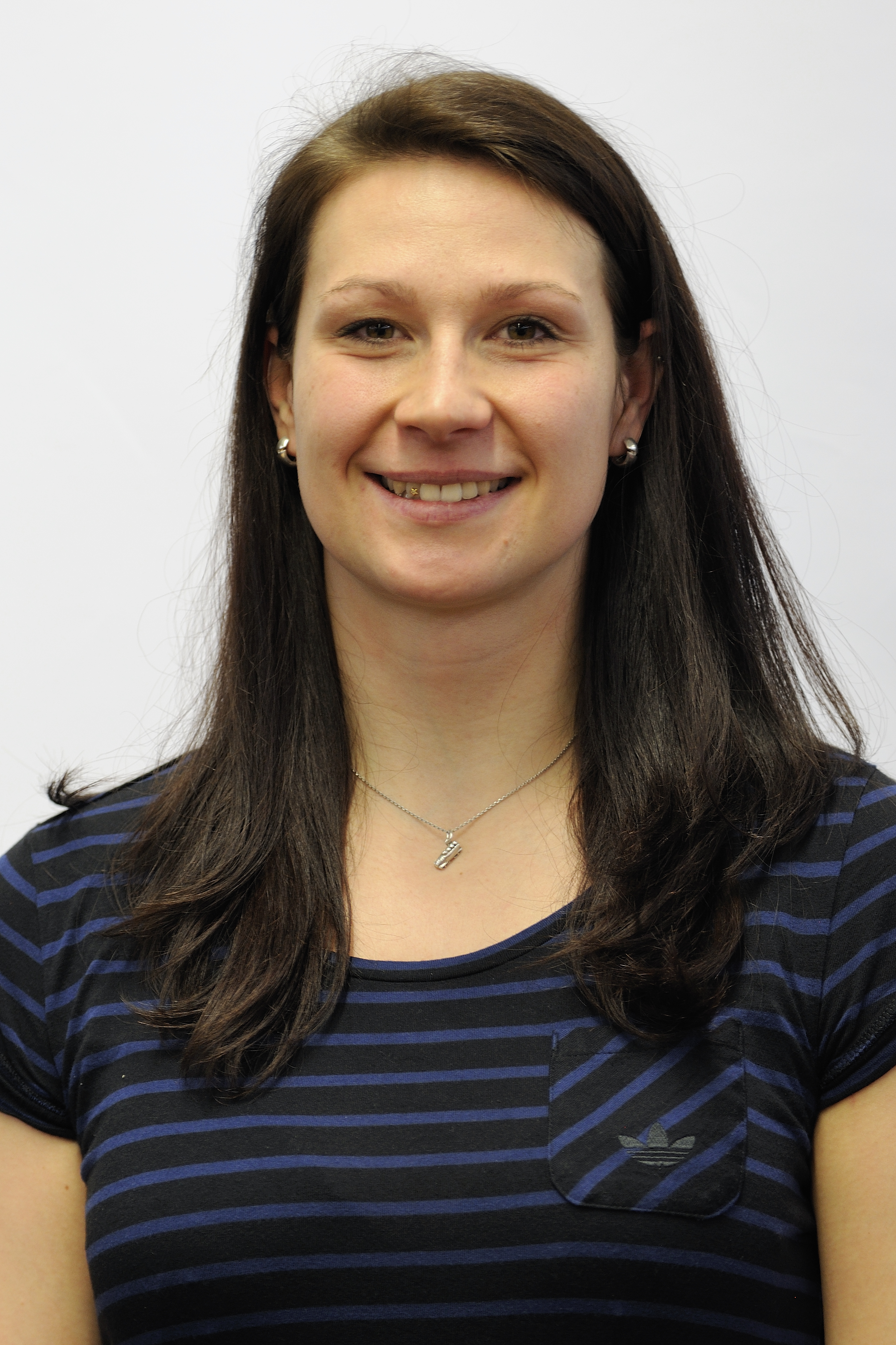
- Senkel in 2014

Medal record

Bobsleigh

Representing Germany

European Championships
Silver medal – second place	2011 Winterberg	Two-woman
Bronze medal – third place	2010 Innsbruck-Igls	Two-woman

Christin Senkel (born 31 August 1987) is a German bobsledder who has competed since 2008. Her best World Cup finish was second in the two-woman event at Winterberg in December 2011.

Senkel also finished seventh in the team event at the FIBT World Championships 2009 in Lake Placid, New York. Senkel was originally part of Anja Schneiderheinze-Stöckel's team, but after her good performances, she temporarily switched to Claudia Schramm's World Cup team. After achieving the fastest times in a pre-Olympic test in early January 2010, national coach Wolfgang Hoppe assigned her to the German number one, Sandra Kiriasis, for the Olympic Games. Within a relatively short period of time, Senkel was successively the pusher for all five outstanding German bobsleigh pilots at the time.

She and Sandra Kiriasis finished fourth in the two-woman event at the 2010 Winter Olympics in Vancouver. Senkel and Cathleen Martini finished seventh at the 2014 Winter Olympics.
