= Nikolay Khrenkov =

Russian bobsledder (1984–2014)

Personal information
- Full name: Nikolay Nikolayevich Khrenkov
- Born: 15 July 1984 Zheleznogorsk, Russia
- Died: 2 June 2014 (aged 29) Podgorny, Russia
- Height: 1.84 m (6 ft 0 in)
- Weight: 96 kg (212 lb)

Sport
- Country: Russia
- Sport: Bobsleigh
- Turned pro: 2008
Medal record
Men's bobsleigh
Representing Russia
European Championships
| Silver medal – second place | 2011 Winterberg | Four-man |
| Silver medal – second place | 2012 Altenberg | Four-man |

Nikolay Nikolayevich Khrenkov (Russian: Николай Николаевич Хренков, 15 July 1984 – 2 June 2014) was a Russian bobsledder.

== Career ==
Khrenkov's best World Cup finish was first in the four-man event at Park City, Utah in December 2010. He also finished second in a four-man World Cup race at Whistler Sliding Centre in February 2012. He was also a member of the four-man crew led by Alexandr Zubkov which won silver medals at the Bobsleigh European Championship in 2011 and 2012. Khrenkov competed for Russia at the 2014 Winter Olympics in the four-man bobsleigh event.

Khrenkov was killed in a car crash near the village of Podgorny on 2 June 2014. He was on his way to see his parents. Khrenkov was 29.
