= Viktoria Tokovaya =

Russian bobsledder (born 1976)

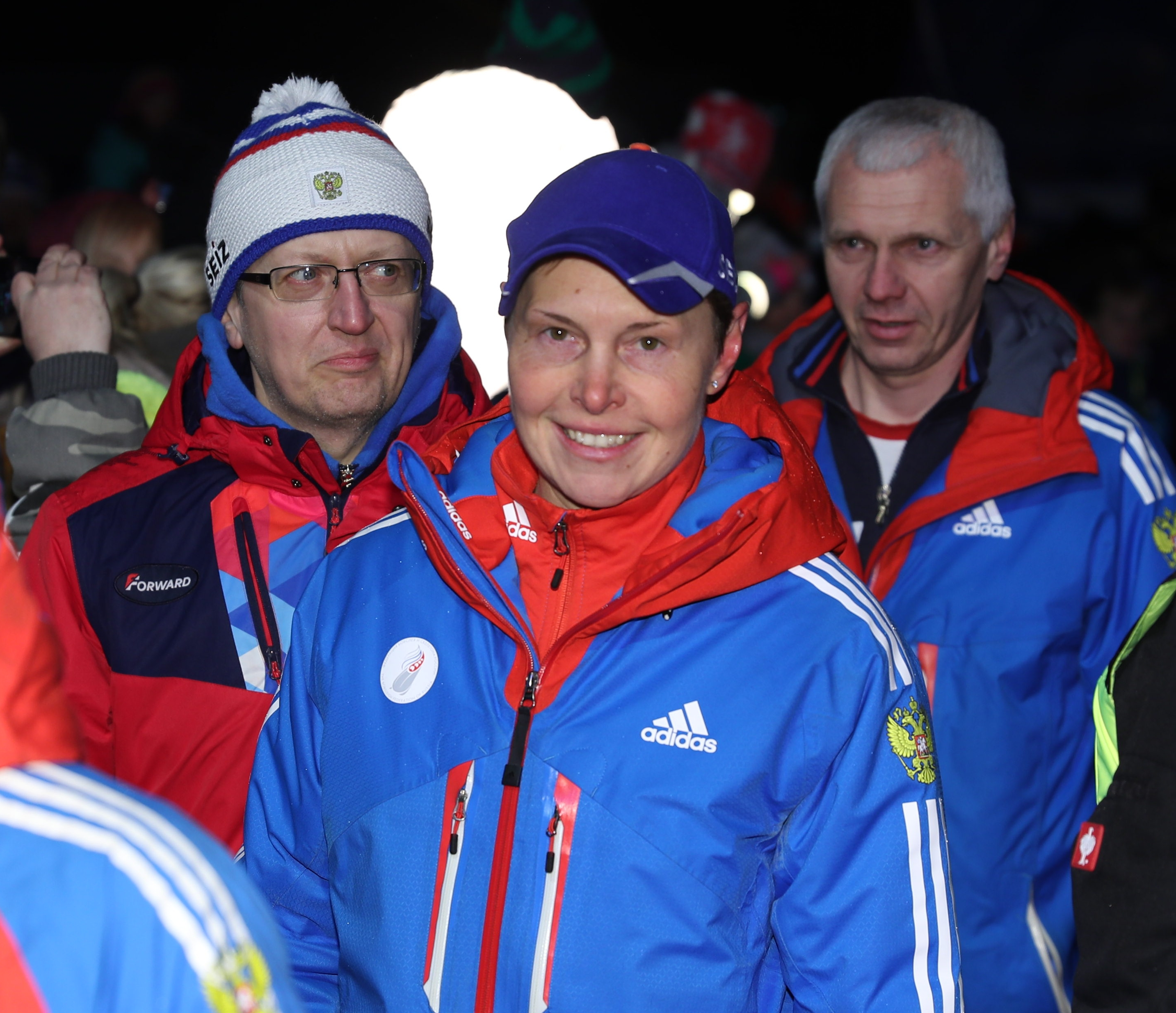
Opening Ceremony at the Bobsleigh and Skeleton World Championships 2020 in Altenberg

Viktoria Tokovaya (born 1 January 1976) is a Russian bobsledder who has competed since 1999. Competed in two Winter Olympics, she earned her best finish of seventh in the two-woman event at Turin in 2006.

Tokovaya also competed in the FIBT World Championships, earning her best finish of 12th in the two-woman event at Lake Placid in 2009.
