= Simone Bertazzo =

Italian bobsledder (born 1982)

Personal information
- Born: 19 August 1982 (age 43)
Medal record
Men's Bobsleigh
Representing Italy
World Championships
Bronze medal – third place	2007 St. Moritz	Two-man
World Cup Championships
Bronze medal – third place	2010–11	Two-man

Simone Bertazzo (born 19 August 1982) is a retired Italian bobsledder and current bobsled coach who has competed since 2001. He won a bronze medal in the two-man event at the 2007 FIBT World Championships in St. Moritz.

Bertazzo also competed in two Winter Olympics, earning his best finish of tied for ninth in the four-man event at Vancouver in 2010.

In July 2018, he announced that he would retire from competition after the 2019 World Championships in Whistler, and the following November he was chosen to join fellow German Manuel Machata as the new head coach of the Italian national bobsled team.
