= Florian Becke =

German bobsledder

Personal information
- Born: 15 March 1983 (age 43)
- Height: 1.84 m (6 ft 1/2 in)
- Weight: 102 kg (225 lb; 16.1 st)

Sport
- Country: Germany
- Sport: Bobsleigh
- Turned pro: 2002
Medal record
World Championships
Gold medal – first place	2011 Königssee	Mixed team

Florian Becke (born 15 March 1983) is a German bobsledder who has competed since 2002. His best World Cup finish was first in the four-man event at Winterberg in January 2011.

He won gold at the 2011 FIBT World Championships in Königssee in the mixed team event.
