= Gino Gerhardi =

German bobsledder (born 1988)

Personal information
- Born: 1 August 1988 (age 37)
- Height: 1.91 m (6 ft 3 in)
- Weight: 102 kg (225 lb; 16.1 st)

Sport
- Country: Germany
- Sport: Bobsleigh
- Turned pro: 2006
Medal record
Men´s Bobsleigh
Representing Germany
World Championships
Silver medal – second place	2013 St. Moritz	Mixed team

Gino Gerhardi (born 1 October 1988) is a German bobsledder who has competed since 2006.
