= Hanne Schenk =

Swiss bobsledder (born 1984)

Medal record

Bobsleigh

Representing Switzerland

European Championships
| Silver medal – second place | 2010 Innsbruck-Igls | Two-woman |
| Bronze medal – third place | 2012 Altenberg | Two-woman |

Hanne Schenk (born 10 May 1984) is a Swiss bobsledder who has competed since 2007. She finished tenth in the two-woman event at the 2010 Winter Olympics in Vancouver.

Schenk finished 12th in the two-woman event at the FIBT World Championships 2008 in Altenberg, Germany. Her best finish at the World Championships was a sixth place in the two-woman event in 2012. Her best World Cup finish was second at the Königssee meeting in January 2012. In addition Schenk has won two medals at the Bobsleigh European Championship (a silver in 2010 and a bronze in 2012) and won gold at the World Junior Championships in 2009.
