= Rene Tiefert =

German bobsledder

Personal information
- Born: 28 June 1984 (age 42)
- Height: 1.85 m (6 ft 1 in)
- Weight: 110 kg (240 lb; 17 st)

Sport
- Country: Germany
- Sport: Bobsleigh
- Turned pro: 2001

Rene Tiefert (born 28 June 1984) is a German bobsledder who has competed since 2001. His best World Cup finish was second in the four-man event at Whistler and Lake Placid in November–December 2010.
