= Neville Wright =

Canadian bobsledder (born 1980)

Personal information
- Born: 21 December 1980 (age 45) Edmonton, Alberta, Canada
- Height: 1.83 m (6 ft 0 in) (2010)
- Weight: 97 kg (214 lb) (2010)

Sport
- Country: Canada
- Sport: Bobsled
- Club: Edmonton International Track

Achievements and titles
- Olympic finals: 2010: four-man

Neville Wright (born 21 December 1980) is a Canadian bobsledder. Wright competed at the 2010 Winter Olympics in Vancouver in the four-man competition, finishing fifth.

Born in Edmonton, Alberta, Wright was a sprinter with the Alberta Golden Bears where his performance attracted the attention of Canadian bobsleigh officials. In 2009, he began training for the national bobsled team with Pierre Lueders.
