= Michail Makarow =

German bobsledder

Personal information
- Born: 13 January 1984 (age 42)
- Height: 1.83 m (6 ft 0 in)
- Weight: 100 kg (220 lb; 16 st)

Sport
- Country: Germany
- Sport: Bobsleigh
- Turned pro: 2004

Michail Makarow (born 13 January 1984) is a German bobsledder who has competed since 2004. His best World Cup finish was first in the four-man event at Calgary in December 2010.
