= Alex Mann (bobsleigh) =

German bobsledder (born 1980)

Alexandre Mann
Personal information
- Born: 11 November 1980 (age 45)
Medal record
Men's Bobsleigh
Representing Germany
World Championships
Gold medal – first place	2008 Altenberg	Mixed team
Silver medal – second place	2011 Königssee	Four-man
Silver medal – second place	2011 Königssee	Mixed team
Bronze medal – third place	2008 Altenberg	Four-man

Alexander "Alex" Mann (born 11 November 1980) is a German bobsledder who has competed since 2007. He won two medals at the 2008 FIBT World Championships in Altenberg, Germany with a gold in the mixed team event and a bronze in the four-man event.

Mann finished seventh in the four-man event at the 2010 Winter Olympics in Vancouver.
