= Cody Sorensen =

Canadian bobsledder

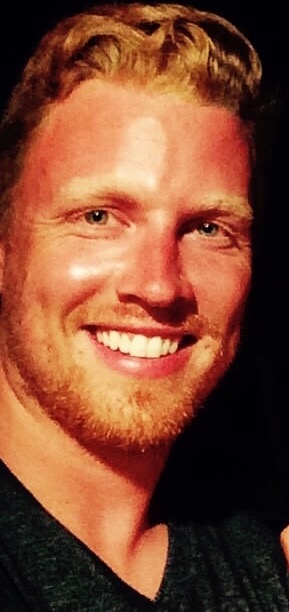
- 2014

Personal information
- Born: 6 October 1986 (age 39) Ottawa, Ontario, Canada
- Height: 1.83 m (6 ft 0 in)

Sport
- Country: Canada
- Sport: Bobsleigh

Achievements and titles
- Olympic finals: Sochi 2014, Beijing 2022
Medal record
World Championships
Bronze medal – third place	2011 Königssee	Mixed team
Bronze medal – third place	2013 St. Moritz	Mixed team

Cody Sorensen (born 6 October 1986) is a Canadian Olympic bobsledder who has competed since 2008. He is a 4-time World Cup medallist, including third place in the four-man event at Park City and Lake Placid in December 2010. As a member of team Spring, Sorensen was ranked 2nd in the World in 4-man bobsleigh in the 2013/2014 season. Cody was named the 2010 Ontario male athlete of the year. In 2022, at 35 years of age, Cody made an unprecedented return to the Olympics after 8 years of retirement and finished 9th in the 2022 Olympic Games in Beijing. Cody currently leads the mergers and acquisitions division at Welch Capital Partners in Ottawa, Canada.

== Career ==
Before being in bobsleigh, Sorensen was a hurdler at the University of Guelph.

In January 2022, Sorensen was named to Canada's 2022 Olympic team.
