= Edgars Maskalāns =

Latvian bobsledder

Edgars Maskalāns (born 13 April 1982) is a Latvian bobsledder who has competed from 2006 to 2012.

His best World Cup finish was first place in the four-man event at St. Moritz, Switzerland in January 2011. He also finished 2nd in the four-man event at Cesana, Italy in February 2011 and 3rd in the four-man event at St. Moritz at January 2012.

Maskalāns' best finish at the FIBT World Championships was 6th in the four-man event at Lake Placid, United States in 2012.

He finished eighth in the two-man event and tenth in the four-man event at the 2010 Winter Olympics in Vancouver.
