= Jürgen Loacker =

Austrian bobsledder

Personal information
- Full name: Jürgen Loacker
- Nationality: (Austria) Austrian
- Born: 14 December 1974 (age 51)
- Height: 5 ft 9.2 in (1.76 m)
- Weight: 201 lb (91 kg)
- Website: Team Loacker

Sport
- Country: Austria
- Sport: Bobsleigh (pilot)
- Club: BC Rankweil
- Turned pro: 1999

Jürgen Loacker (born 14 December 1974) is an Austrian bobsledder who competed from 1999 to 2013. Competing in two Winter Olympics, he earned his best finish of 13th in the four-man event at Turin in 2006.

At the FIBT World Championships, Loacker earned his best finish of eighth in the four-man event twice (2008, 2009).
