= Ronny Listner =

German bobsledder (born 1979)

Personal information
- Born: 20 July 1978 (age 48) Karl-Marx-Stadt, Saxony, East Germany
- Height: 1.90 m (6 ft 3 in)
- Weight: 106 kg (234 lb; 16.7 st)

Sport
- Country: Germany
- Sport: Bobsleigh
- Turned pro: 2000

Achievements and titles
- Olympic finals: 4th
Medal record
Men´s Bobsleigh
Representing Germany
World Championships
Bronze medal – third place	2008 Altenberg	Four-man

Ronny Listner (born 20 July 1979 in Karl-Marx-Stadt, Saxony, East Germany) is a German bobsledder, who has competed since 2000. He won the bronze medal in the four-man event at the 2008 FIBT World Championships in Altenberg, Germany.

At the 2010 Winter Olympics in Vancouver, Listner finished fourth in the four-man event.
