= Cathleen Martini =

German bobsledder (born 1982)

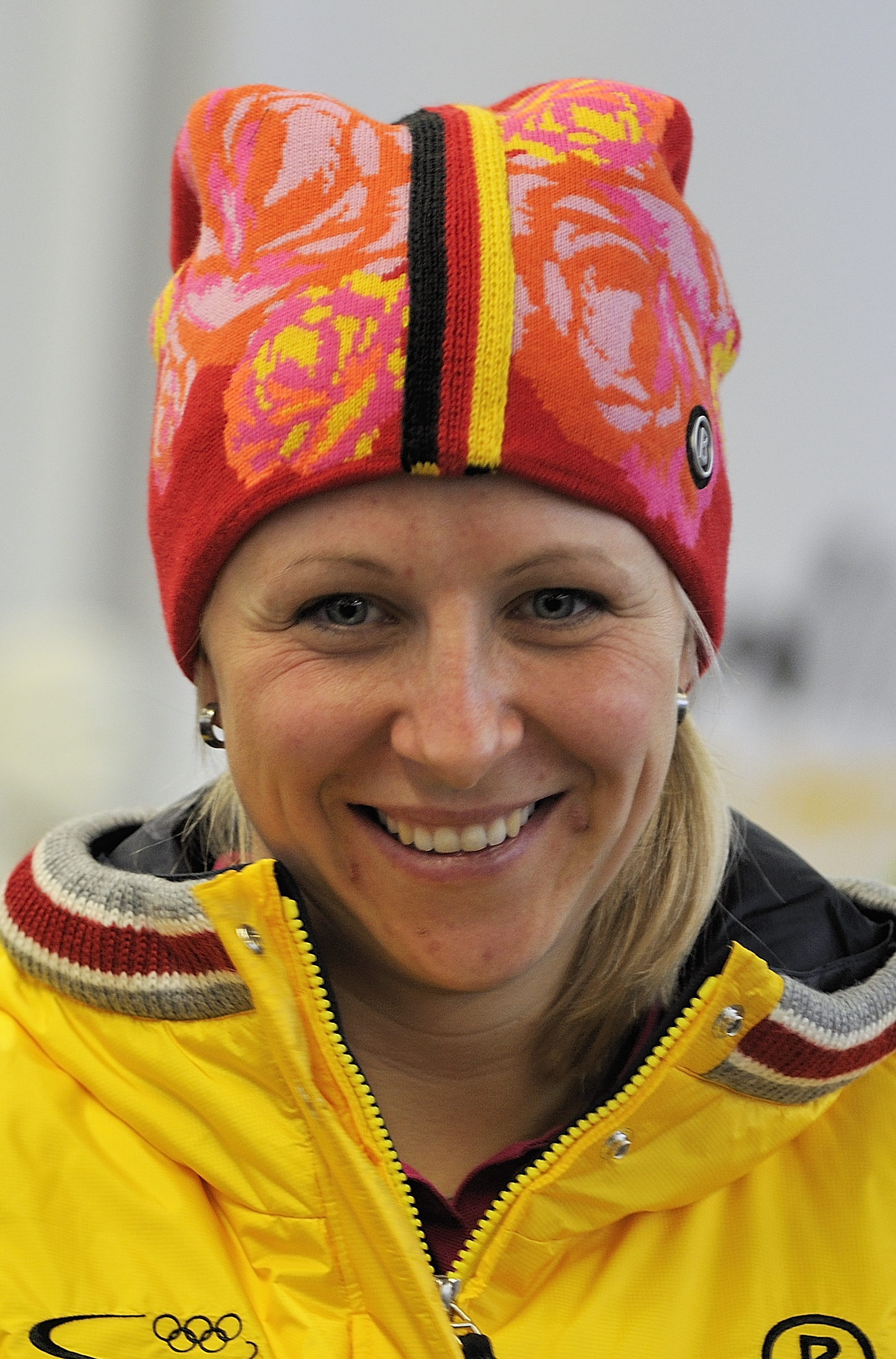

Personal information
- Born: 27 May 1982 (age 44) Zwickau, East Germany
- Height: 170 cm (5 ft 7 in)
- Weight: 73 kg (161 lb)
Medal record
Women's bobsleigh
Representing Germany
World Championships
Gold medal – first place	2011 Königssee	Two-woman
Gold medal – first place	2015 Winterberg	Mixed team
Silver medal – second place	2007 St. Moritz	Two-woman
Silver medal – second place	2008 Altenberg	Two-woman
Silver medal – second place	2011 Königssee	Mixed team
Bronze medal – third place	2003 Winterberg	Two-woman
Bronze medal – third place	2009 Lake Placid	Two-woman
Bronze medal – third place	2015 Winterberg	Two-woman
European Championships
Gold medal – first place	2004 Sigulda	Two-woman
Gold medal – first place	2005 Altenberg	Two-woman
Gold medal – first place	2010 Innsbruck-Igls	Two-woman
Gold medal – first place	2012 Altenberg	Two-woman
Silver medal – second place	2007 Cortina d'Ampezzo	Two-woman
Silver medal – second place	2008 Cesana	Two-woman
Silver medal – second place	2009 St. Moritz	Two-woman
Silver medal – second place	2015 La Plagne	Two-woman
Bronze medal – third place	2013 Innsbruck-Igls	Two-woman

Cathleen Martini (born 27 May 1982) is a German bobsleigher who has competed since 2000. She won four medals in the two-woman event at the FIBT World Championships with two silvers (2007, 2008) and two bronzes (2003, 2009).

In the Bobsleigh World Cup, Martini has finished second four times in the overall two-woman standings (2004–5, 2007-8, 2008–09, 2010–11).

She was also European champion in 2004 and 2005, and has so far won 7 World Cup competitions.

At the 2010 Winter Olympics in Vancouver, Martini was disqualified when she crashed out at the final run of the two-woman event that ejected her brakewoman Romy Logsch. At the 2014 Winter Olympics, she and Christin Senkel finished seventh.
