= Anastasia Tambovtseva =

Russian bobsledder and luger

Anastasiya Valeryevna Tambovtseva (née Skulkina; Russian: Анастасия Валерьевна Тамбовцева (Скулкина); born August 11, 1982) is a Russian luger and bobsledder who competed from 2001 to 2006. Competing in two Winter Olympics, she earned her best finish of 21st in the women's singles event at Turin in 2006.

Tambovtseva's best finish at the FIL European Luge Championships was 16th at Altenberg in 2002.

Since 2007, Tambovtseva has competed in bobsleigh. Her best World Cup finish was 13th at Park City, Utah in November 2009.

At the 2010 Winter Olympics in Vancouver, Skulikina finished ninth in the two-woman event.
