= Christian Poser =

German bobsledder (born 1986)

Personal information
- Born: 16 August 1986 (age 39)
- Height: 1.86 m (6 ft 1 in)
- Weight: 90 kg (198 lb)

Sport
- Country: Germany
- Sport: Bobsleigh
- Turned pro: 2008
Medal record
Men's bobsleigh
Representing Germany
World Championships
Gold medal – first place	2011 Königssee	Four-man
Silver medal – second place	2015 Winterberg	Four-man
Bronze medal – third place	2012 Lake Placid	Four-man

Christian Poser (born 16 August 1986) is a German bobsledder who has competed since 2008. His best World Cup finish was first in the four-man event at Calgary in December 2010. Poser competed for Germany at the 2014 Winter Olympics and 2018 Winter Olympics.

Poser became engaged to American bobsledder Jamie Greubel in April 2013. The couple married in the summer of 2014.
