= Andreas Bredau =

German bobsledder (born 1984)

Personal information
- Born: 21 March 1984 (age 42) Burg bei Magdeburg, East Germany
- Height: 1.96 m (6 ft 5 in)
- Weight: 107 kg (236 lb; 16.8 st)

Sport
- Country: Germany
- Sport: Bobsleigh
- Turned pro: 2005

Achievements and titles
- Olympic finals: 7th
Medal record
Men's Bobsleigh
Representing Germany
World Championships
Gold medal – first place	2011 Königssee	Four-man
Silver medal – second place	2011 Königssee	Two-man
Silver medal – second place	2015 Winterberg	Four-man
Bronze medal – third place	2012 Lake Placid	Four-man
Bronze medal – third place	2013 St. Moritz	Two-man

Andreas Bredau (born 21 March 1984) is a German bobsledder who has competed since 2005. His best World Cup finish was second in the four-man event at St. Moritz in January 2010. Bredau finished seventh in the four-man event at the 2010 Winter Olympics in Vancouver.
