= Thomas Florschütz =

German bobsledder (born 1978)

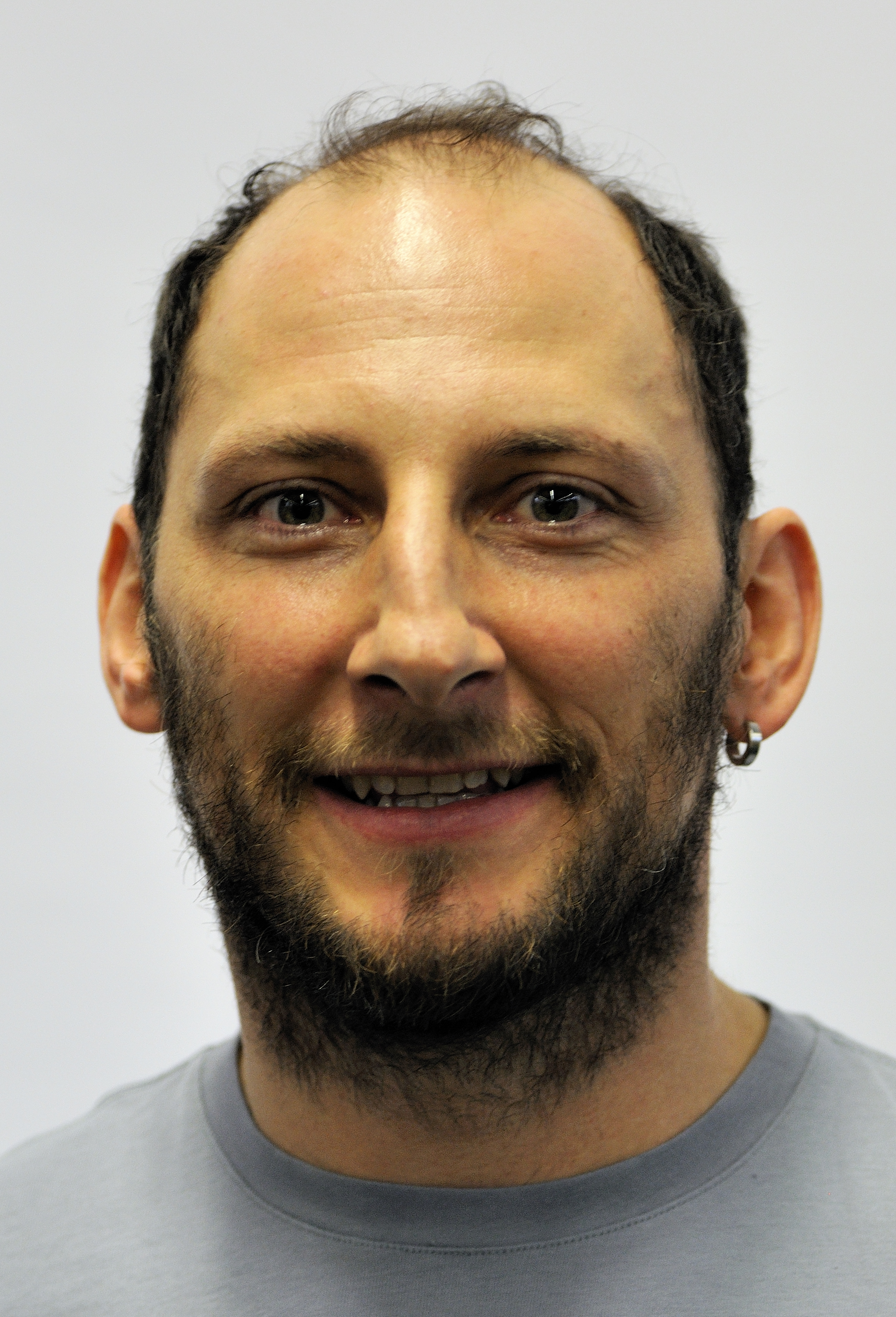
- Florschütz in 2014

Personal information
- Nationality: German
- Born: 20 February 1978 (age 48) Sonneberg, ,East Germany
- Height: 1.84 m (6 ft 0 in)
- Weight: 97 kg (214 lb)

Sport
- Country: Germany
- Sport: Bobsleigh (pilot)
- Club: BRC Riesa

Achievements and titles
- Olympic finals: 2nd place, silver medalist(s)
Medal record
Men´s Bobsleigh
Representing Germany
Olympic Games
Silver medal – second place	2010 Vancouver	Two-man
World Championships
Gold medal – first place	2009 Lake Placid	Mixed team
Silver medal – second place	2008 Altenberg	Two-man
Silver medal – second place	2009 Lake Placid	Two-man
Silver medal – second place	2011 Königssee	Two-man
Bronze medal – third place	2013 St. Moritz	Two-man
World Cup Championships
Silver medal – second place	2009–10	Two-man
Bronze medal – third place	2009–10	Combined
Bronze medal – third place	2008–09	Two-man
European Championships
Silver medal – second place	2009 St. Moritz	Four-man
Bronze medal – third place	2009 St. Moritz	Two-man
World Junior Championships
Silver medal – second place	2004 Cortina d'Ampezzo	Four-man

Thomas Florschütz (born 20 February 1978 in Sonneberg) is a German bobsledder who has competed since 2006. He won a silver medal in the two-man event at the 2010 Winter Olympics in Vancouver.

He won three medals at the FIBT World Championships with a gold (Mixed team: 2009) and two silvers (Two-man: 2008, 2009).

His older brother André competed for Germany in luge and won a silver medal in the two-man event at the 2006 Winter Olympics in Torino.
