= 2015–16 Bobsleigh World Cup =

Winners
- Two-man: Won Yun-jong (KOR)
- Four-man: Maximilian Arndt (GER)
- Two-woman: Kaillie Humphries (CAN)

Competitions
- Venues: 7 (8 events)

The 2015–16 Bobsleigh World Cup was a multi-race tournament over a season for bobsleigh. The season started on 27 November 2015 in Altenberg, Germany and ended on 28 February 2016 in Königssee, Germany. The World Cup was organised by the IBSF (formerly the FIBT) who also run World Cups and Championships in skeleton. The season was sponsored by BMW.

== Calendar ==
Below is the schedule of the 2015/16 season.

Venue	Date	Details
(Germany) Altenberg	27–29 November 2015	
(Germany) Winterberg	5–6 December 2015	
(Germany) Königssee	11–13 December 2015	
(United States) Lake Placid	8–9 January 2016	
(United States) Park City	15–16 January 2016	No Two-man race. Double race for four-man.
(Canada) Whistler	22–23 January 2016	No Four-man race. Double race for two-man.
(Switzerland) St. Moritz	6–7 February 2016	
(Germany) Königssee	26–28 February 2016	

== Results ==
=== Two-man ===
Event:	Gold:	Time	Silver:	Time	Bronze:	Time
(Germany) Altenberg	Francesco Friedrich; Thorsten Margis; Germany	1:52.56 (55.92 / 56.64)	Oskars Melbārdis; Daumants Dreiškens; Latvia	1:53.02 (55.80 / 57.22)	Won Yun-jong; Seo Young-woo; South Korea	1:53.04 (55.96 / 57.08)
(Germany) Winterberg	Francesco Friedrich; Thorsten Margis; Germany	1:50.37 (55.02 / 55.35)	Oskars Melbārdis; Daumants Dreiškens; Latvia	1:50.50 (55.19 / 55.31)	Won Yun-jong; Seo Young-woo; South Korea	1:50.71 (55.30 / 55.41)
(Germany) Königssee	Francesco Friedrich; Thorsten Margis; Germany	1:38.77 (49.29 / 49.48)	Oskars Melbārdis; Daumants Dreiškens; Latvia	1:39.05 (49.48 / 49.57)	Nico Walther; Marko Hübenbecker; Germany	1:39.50 (49.57 / 49.93)
(United States) Lake Placid	Steven Holcomb; Carlo Valdes; United States	1:51.00 (55.48 / 55.52)	Nico Walther; Christian Poser; Germany	1:51.11 (55.37 / 55.74)	Won Yun-jong; Seo Young-woo; South Korea	1:51.12 (55.42 / 55.70)
(Canada) Whistler (1st race)	Rico Peter; Thomas Amrhein; Switzerland; Won Yun-jong; Seo Young-woo; South Korea	1:43.41 (51.70 / 51.71); 1:43.41 (51.63 / 51.78)			Alexander Kasjanov; Aleksei Pushkarev; Russia	1:43.42 (51.61 / 51.81)
(Canada) Whistler (2nd race)	Christopher Spring; Lascelles Brown; Canada	1:42.76 (51.35 / 51.41)	Uģis Žaļims; Intars Dambis; Latvia	1:42.96 (51.43 / 51.53)	Alexander Kasjanov; Aleksei Pushkarev; Russia	1:43.00 (51.31 / 51.69)
(Switzerland) St. Moritz	Beat Hefti; Alex Baumann; Switzerland	2:12.60 (1:06.17 / 1:06.43)	Steven Holcomb; Carlo Valdes; United States	2:12.78 (1:06.38 / 1:06.40)	Nico Walther; Christian Poser; Germany	2:12.80 (1:06.49 / 1:06.31)
(Germany) Königssee	Won Yun-jong; Seo Young-woo; South Korea	1:39.50 (49.59 / 49.91)	Beat Hefti; Alex Baumann; Switzerland	1:39.55 (49.61 / 49.94)	Francesco Friedrich; Candy Bauer; Germany	1:39.65 (49.70 / 49.95)

=== Four-man ===
Event:	Gold:	Time	Silver:	Time	Bronze:	Time
(Germany) Altenberg	Francesco Friedrich; Martin Putze; Jannis Bäcker; Thorsten Margis; Germany	1:51.79 (55.81 / 55.98)	Nico Walther; Marko Hübenbecker; Christian Poser; Eric Franke; Germany	1:51.88 (55.65 / 56.23)	Maximilian Arndt; Kevin Kuske; Ben Heber; Kevin Korona; Germany	1:52.03 (55.75 / 56.28)
(Germany) Winterberg	Francesco Friedrich; Martin Putze; Jannis Bäcker; Thorsten Margis; Germany	1:50.58 (55.35 / 55.23)	Maximilian Arndt; Kevin Kuske; Alexander Rödiger; Ben Heber; Germany	1:50.63 (55.28 / 55.35)	Nico Walther; Marko Hübenbecker; Christian Poser; Philipp Wobeto; Germany	1:50.74 (55.36 / 55.38)
(Germany) Königssee	Nico Walther; Gregor Bermbach; Marko Hübenbecker; Eric Franke; Germany	1:37.57 (48.83 / 48.74)	Maximilian Arndt; Kevin Kuske; Martin Putze; Kevin Korona; Germany	1:37.75 (48.89 / 48.86)	Rico Peter; Thomas Amrhein; Bror van der Zijde; Simon Friedli; Switzerland	1:37.95 (48.95 / 49.00)
(United States) Lake Placid	Maximilian Arndt; Martin Putze; Ben Heber; Kevin Korona; Germany	1:49.70 (54.49 / 55.21)	Alexander Kasjanov; Aleksei Pushkarev; Ilvir Huzin; Aleksey Zaytsev; Russia	1:49.98 (54.68 / 55.30)	Justin Kripps; Derek Plug; Ben Coakwell; Alexander Kopacz; Canada	1:50.07 (54.73 / 55.34)
(United States) Park City (1st race)	Alexander Kasjanov; Ilvir Huzin; Aleksei Pushkarev; Aleksey Zaytsev; Russia	1:36.20 (47.90 / 48.30)	Maximilian Arndt; Alexander Rödiger; Ben Heber; Kevin Korona; Germany	1:36.24 (47.97 / 48.27)	Rico Peter; Fabio Badraun; Thomas Amrhein; Simon Friedli; Switzerland	1:36.42 (48.00 / 48.42)
(United States) Park City (2nd race)	Nico Walther; Marko Hübenbecker; Christian Poser; Eric Franke; Germany	1:36.38 (48.08 / 48.30)	Maximilian Arndt; Martin Putze; Ben Heber; Kevin Korona; Germany	1:36.40 (48.10 / 48.30)	Rico Peter; Fabio Badraun; Thomas Amrhein; Bror van der Zijde; Switzerland	1:36.46 (48.23 / 48.23)
(Switzerland) St. Moritz	Maximilian Arndt; Kevin Korona; Martin Putze; Ben Heber; Germany	2:11.88 (1:05.63 / 1:06.25)	Benjamin Maier; Marco Rangl; Markus Sammer; Dănuț Moldovan; Austria	2:12.06 (1:06.10 / 1:05.96)	Oskars Melbārdis; Daumants Dreiškens; Arvis Vilkaste; Jānis Strenga; Latvia	2:12.15 (1:06.00 / 1:06.15)
(Germany) Königssee	Maximilian Arndt; Alexander Rödiger; Kevin Kuske; Martin Putze; Germany	1:38.15 (49.07 / 49.08)	Benjamin Maier; Marco Rangl; Markus Sammer; Dănuț Moldovan; Austria	1:38.28 (49.11 / 49.17)	Francesco Friedrich; Candy Bauer; Martin Grothkopp; Thorsten Margis; Germany	1:38.39 (49.14 / 49.25)

=== Two-woman ===
Event:	Gold:	Time	Silver:	Time	Bronze:	Time
(Germany) Altenberg	Kaillie Humphries; Melissa Lotholz; Canada	1:53.67 (56.77 / 56.90)	Elfje Willemsen; Sophie Vercruyssen; Belgium	1:54.41 (57.31 / 57.10)	Jamie Greubel Poser; Lauren Gibbs; United States; Christina Hengster; Sanne Dekker; Austria	1:54.72 (57.44 / 57.28) 1:54.72 (57.26 / 57.46)
(Germany) Winterberg	Jamie Greubel Poser; Cherrelle Garrett; United States	1:53.74 (56.74 / 57.00)	Elana Meyers Taylor; Kehri Jones; United States	1:53.89 (56.92 / 56.97)	Kaillie Humphries; Melissa Lotholz; Canada	1:54.09 (56.95 / 57.14)
(Germany) Königssee	Kaillie Humphries; Melissa Lotholz; Canada	1:41.21 (50.55 / 50.66)	Elfje Willemsen; Sophie Vercruyssen; Belgium	1:41.74 (50.82 / 50.92)	Jamie Greubel Poser; Lauren Gibbs; United States	1:41.85 (50.88 / 50.97)
(United States) Lake Placid	Jamie Greubel Poser; Cherrelle Garrett; United States	1:53.48 (56.55 / 56.93)	Kaillie Humphries; Melissa Lotholz; Canada	1:53.91 (56.74 / 57.17)	Christina Hengster; Sanne Dekker; Austria	1:54.30 (56.97 / 57.33)
(United States) Park City	Kaillie Humphries; Melissa Lotholz; Canada	1:40.38 (50.29 / 50.09)	Christina Hengster; Sanne Dekker; Austria	1:40.54 (50.27 / 50.27)	Jamie Greubel Poser; Lauren Gibbs; United States	1:40.85 (50.36 / 50.49)
(Canada) Whistler	Kaillie Humphries; Melissa Lotholz; Canada	1:45.37 (52.71 / 52.66)	Jamie Greubel Poser; Cherrelle Garrett; United States	1:45.52 (52.77 / 52.75)	Christina Hengster; Sanne Dekker; Austria	1:45.64 (52.81 / 52.83)
(Switzerland) St. Moritz	Elana Meyers Taylor; Lauren Gibbs; United States	2:16.53 (1:08.39 / 1:08.14)	Anja Schneiderheinze; Annika Drazek; Germany	2:16.91 (1:08.74 / 1:08.17)	Kaillie Humphries; Melissa Lotholz; Canada	2:17.29 (1:09.10 / 1:08.19)
(Germany) Königssee	Elana Meyers Taylor; Kehri Jones; United States	1:41.80 (50.83 / 50.97)	Kaillie Humphries; Melissa Lotholz; Canada	1:41.83 (50.80 / 51.03)	Anja Schneiderheinze; Annika Drazek; Germany	1:42.02 (50.98 / 51.04)

== Standings ==
=== Two-men ===
Pos.	Racer	(Germany) ALT	(Germany) WIN	(Germany) KON1	(United States) LPL	(Canada) WHI1	(Canada) WHI2	(Switzerland) STM	(Germany) KON2	Points
1	Won Yun-jong (KOR)	3	3	6	3	1	9	5	1	1562
2	Nico Walther (GER)	4	7	3	2	12	6	3	6	1450
3	Uģis Žaļims (LAT)	8	5	10	5	4	2	7	7	1410
4	Rico Peter (SUI)	7	8	5	9	1	7	17	4	1337
5	Oskars Melbārdis (LAT)	2	2	2	–	5	4	10	5	1334
6	Francesco Friedrich (GER)	1	1	1	8	dnf	16	10	3	1275
7	Justin Kripps (CAN)	6	10	4	4	8	5	25	7	1256
8	Steven Holcomb (USA)	12	18	7	1	7	12	2	11	1243
9	Alexander Kasjanov (RUS)	10	9	12	13	3	3	8	12	1232
10	Maximilian Arndt (GER)	4	13	9	6	9	8	4	–	1144
11	Alexey Stulnev (RUS)	18	15	11	14	10	10	9	10	1016
12	Nick Cunningham (USA)	19	4	8	6	14	19	14	14	1012
13	Chris Spring (CAN)	21	11	22	12	5	1	13	19	985
14	Oskars Ķibermanis (LAT)	9	6	17	10	18	18	12	16	944
15	Simone Bertazzo (ITA)	14	20	14	17	15	11	16	15	820
16	Kim Dong-hyun (KOR)	13	12	12	15	11	dsq	22	18	752
17	Beat Hefti (SUI)	11	17	18	–	–	–	1	2	739
18	Nikita Zakharov (RUS)	-	14	19	16	13	14	–	–	514
19	Benjamin Maier (AUT)	20	25	21	–	–	–	15	17	362
20	Ivo de Bruin (NED)	–	–	–	–	18	13	29	21	294
21	Maxim Andrianov (RUS)	16	–	–	–	–	–	6	–	272
22	Bradley Hall (GBR)	–	–	20	–	–	–	18	13	268
23	Mateusz Luty (POL)	17	–	15	–	–	–	19	–	266
24	Rudy Rinaldi (MON)	-	16	16	–	–	–	20	–	260
25	Pius Meyerhans (SUI)	–	–	–	–	16	15	–	–	200
26	Jan Vrba (CZE)	22	22	25	–	–	–	27	–	184
27	Lamin Deen (GBR)	14	21	–	dsq	–	–	–	–	174
28	Bruce Tasker (GBR)	–	–	22	–	–	–	22	23	162
29	Heath Spence (AUS)	–	–	–	–	20	17	–	–	156
30	Johannes Lochner (GER)	–	–	–	–	–	–	–	9	152
31	Loïc Costerg (FRA)	-	19	24	–	–	–	28	–	147
32	Dakarai Kongela (USA)	–	–	–	–	19	20	–	–	142
33	Codie Bascue (USA)	–	–	–	13	–	–	–	–	136
34	Vuk Rađenović (SRB)	-	23	28	–	–	–	–	24	123
35	Dominik Dvořák (CZE)	-	–	–	–	–	–	26	20	104
36	Markus Sammer (AUT)	-	23	26	–	–	–	–	–	86
37	Oliver Biddulph (GBR)	23	28	–	–	–	–	–	–	78
38	Radek Matoušek (CZE)	-	27	27	–	–	–	–	–	64
39	Justin Olsen (USA)	-	–	–	–	–	–	21	–	62
40	Dorin Grigore (ROU)	-	26	29	–	–	–	–	–	60
41	Lukas Kolb (AUT)	-	–	–	–	–	–	31	22	56
42	Nick Polionato (CAN)	-	–	–	–	–	–	22	–	56
43	Thomas Heibl (NOR)	–	–	30	–	–	–	30	–	40

=== Four-man ===
Pos.	Racer	(Germany) ALT	(Germany) WIN	(Germany) KON1	(United States) LPL	(United States) PAC1	(United States) PAC2	(Switzerland) STM	(Germany) KON2	Points
1	Maximilian Arndt (GER)	3	2	2	1	2	2	1	1	1715
2	Francesco Friedrich (GER)	1	1	4	6	7	4	4	3	1570
3	Rico Peter (SUI)	4	4	3	5	3	3	7	6	1512
4	Nico Walther (GER)	2	3	1	13	11	1	5	4	1492
5	Alexander Kasjanov (RUS)	9	6	5	2	1	5	8	7	1459
6	Justin Kripps (CAN)	10	12	10	3	4	10	11	10	1232
7	Alexey Stulnev (RUS)	12	7	7	7	6	9	16	9	1208
8	Simone Bertazzo (ITA)	7	10	15	11	17	12	10	12	1040
9	Lamin Deen (GBR)	6	8	16	4	8	14	21	19	1032
10	Oskars Ķibermanis (LAT)	5	9	19	–	10	6	6	15	1018
11	Steven Holcomb (USA)	17	18	12	8	16	7	15	16	920
12	Oskars Melbārdis (LAT)	8	5	6	–	–	–	3	5	904
13	Uģis Žaļims (LAT)	13	16	17	–	5	7	13	14	888
14	Nikita Zakharov (RUS)	–	11	13	10	14	15	12	13	864
15	Benjamin Maier (AUT)	11	15	9	–	–	–	2	2	812
16	Nick Cunningham (USA)	14	13	14	9	12	13	22	–	800
17	Won Yun-jong (KOR)	16	17	20	14	18	11	20	–	648
18	John James Jackson (GBR)	–	–	8	16	15	20	19	11	638
19	Jan Vrba (CZE)	15	14	11	–	–	–	9	–	504
20	Chris Spring (CAN)	–	–	–	12	9	17	26	18	484
21	Loïc Costerg (FRA)	–	19	18	–	–	–	14	8	426
22	Codie Bascue (USA)	–	–	–	15	13	19	–	–	298
23	Ivo de Bruin (NED)	–	–	–	–	19	18	27	20	254
24	Pius Meyerhans (SUI)	–	–	–	–	20	16	18	–	244
25	Kaillie Humphries (CAN)	–	–	–	17	21	21	28	–	240
26	Lukas Kolb (AUT)	–	–	24	–	–	–	17	17	221
27	Oliver Biddulph (GBR)	18	21	–	–	–	–	–	–	142
28	Dominik Dvořák (CZE)	–	–	–	–	–	–	23	21	112
29	Vuk Rađenović (SRB)	–	dsq	22	–	–	–	–	22	112
30	Dorin Grigore (ROU)	–	22	23	–	–	–	–	–	106
31	Thomas Heibl (NOR)	–	–	21	–	–	–	25	–	102
32	Radek Matoušek (CZE)	–	20	–	–	–	–	–	–	68
33	Edson Bindilatti (BRA)	–	–	–	–	–	–	24	–	45
34	Maxim Andrianov (RUS)	dnf	–	–	–	–	–	–	–	0
34	Mateusz Luty (POL)	–	–	–	–	–	–	dns	–	0

=== Two-woman ===
Pos.	Racer	(Germany) ALT	(Germany) WIN	(Germany) KON1	(United States) LPL	(United States) PAC	(Canada) WHI	(Switzerland) STM	(Germany) KON2	Points
1	Kaillie Humphries (CAN)	1	3	1	2	1	1	3	2	1720
2	Jamie Greubel Poser (USA)	3	1	3	1	3	2	4	6	1628
3	Christina Hengster (AUT)	3	5	4	3	2	3	7	4	1546
4	Elfje Willemsen (BEL)	2	6	2	4	5	7	5	5	1508
5	Anja Schneiderheinze (GER)	5	4	6	5	4	–	2	3	1338
6	An Vannieuwenhuyse (BEL)	7	9	7	6	7	4	14	9	1288
7	Mariama Jamanka (GER)	–	–	8	7	6	5	10	8	992
8	Elana Meyers Taylor (USA)	8	2	–	–	–	–	1	1	820
9	Maria Adela Constantin (ROU)	9	8	10	–	–	–	13	11	712
10	Sandra Kroll (GER)	6	7	5	–	–	–	–	–	528
11	Katrin Beierl (AUT)	–	10	11	–	–	–	11	14	528
12	Brittany Reinbolt (USA)	–	–	–	9	9	6	–	–	480
13	Nicole Vogt (USA)	–	–	–	8	8	8	–	–	480
14	Mica McNeill (GBR)	–	–	9	–	–	–	11	7	456
15	Stephanie Schneider (GER)	–	–	–	–	–	–	6	13	296
16	Aleksandra Rodionova (RUS)	–	–	–	–	–	–	8	12	288
17	Nadezhda Sergeeva (RUS)	–	–	–	–	–	–	15	10	238
18	Katie Eberling (USA)	–	–	–	–	–	–	9	–	152
