= 2014–15 Bobsleigh World Cup =

Bobsleigh tournament in Lake Placid, NY (2014-15)

Winners
- Combined men's: Oskars Melbardis
- Two-man: Oskars Melbardis; Daumants Dreiškens
- Four-man: Oskars Melbardis; Daumants Dreiškens; Arvis Vilkaste; Jānis Strenga
- Two-woman: Elana Meyers; Cherrelle Garrett

Competitions
- Venues: 8 (8 events)

The 2014–15 Bobsleigh World Cup is a multi race tournament over a season for bobsleigh. The season started on 12 December 2014 in Lake Placid, United States and ended on 15 February 2015 in Sochi, Russia. The World Cup is organised by the FIBT who also run World Cups and Championships in skeleton.

== Calendar ==
Below is the schedule of the 2014/15 season.

Venue	Date	Details
(United States) Lake Placid	12–13 December 2014	
(Canada) Calgary	19–20 December 2014	
(Germany) Altenberg	9–11 January 2015	
(Germany) Königssee	16–18 January 2015	
(Switzerland) St. Moritz	24–25 January 2015	
(France) La Plagne	30 January – 1 February 2015	
(Austria) Igls	6–8 February 2015	
(Russia) Sochi	14–15 February 2015	

== Results ==
=== Men's two bob ===
Event:	Gold:	Time	Silver:	Time	Bronze:	Time
Lake Placid	Francesco Friedrich; Thorsten Margis; Germany	1:51.14	Oskars Melbārdis; Daumants Dreiškens; Latvia	1:51.31	Nick Cunningham; Casey Wickline; United States	1:51.40
Calgary	Oskars Melbārdis; Daumants Dreiškens; Latvia	1:49.60	Francesco Friedrich; Martin Grothkopp; Germany	1:49.63	Beat Hefti; Alex Baumann; Switzerland	1:49.66
Altenberg	Beat Hefti; Alex Baumann; Switzerland	1:53.17	Oskars Melbārdis; Daumants Dreiškens; Latvia	1:53.25	Nico Walther; Joshua Bluhm; Germany	1:53.41
Königssee	Beat Hefti; Alex Baumann; Switzerland	1:41.16	Nico Walther; Marko Hübenbecker; Germany	1:41.68	Justin Kripps; Bryan Barnett; Canada	1:42.19
St.Moritz	Oskars Melbārdis; Daumants Dreiškens; Latvia	2:12.23	Beat Hefti; Alex Baumann; Switzerland Uģis Žaļims; Intars Dambis; Latvia	2:12.40		
La Plagne	Francesco Friedrich; Martin Grothkopp; Germany	1:58.48	Oskars Melbārdis; Daumants Dreiškens; Latvia	1:58.52	Rico Peter; Bror van der Zijde; Switzerland	1:58.69
Igls	Francesco Friedrich; Thorsten Margis; Germany	1:43.64	Oskars Melbārdis; Daumants Dreiškens; Latvia	1:43.95	Beat Hefti; Alex Baumann; Switzerland	1:44.26
Sochi	Rico Peter; Simon Friedli; Switzerland	1:52.33	Oskars Melbārdis; Daumants Dreiškens; Latvia	1:52.46	Beat Hefti; Alex Baumann; Switzerland	1:52.60

=== Men's four bob ===
Event:	Gold:	Time	Silver:	Time	Bronze:	Time
Lake Placid	Maximilian Arndt; Kevin Korona; Joshua Bluhm; Ben Heber; Germany	1:49.31	Alexander Kasjanov; Maxim Mokrousov; Ilvir Huzin; Aleksei Pushkarev; Russia	1:49.32	Oskars Melbārdis; Daumants Dreiškens; Arvis Vilkaste; Jānis Strenga; Latvia	1:49.35
Calgary	Oskars Melbārdis; Daumants Dreiškens; Arvis Vilkaste; Jānis Strenga; Latvia	1:47.84	Francesco Friedrich; Jan Speer; Martin Grothkopp; Thorsten Margis; Germany	1:48.01	Maximilian Arndt; Kevin Korona; Joshua Bluhm; Ben Heber; Germany	1:48.14
Altenberg	Nico Walther; Andreas Bredau; Marko Hübenbecker; Christian Poser; Germany	1:48.11	Oskars Melbārdis; Daumants Dreiškens; Arvis Vilkaste; Jānis Strenga; Latvia	1:48.15	Rico Peter; Bror van der Zijde; Thomas Amrhein; Simon Friedli; Switzerland	1:48.78
Königssee	Maximilian Arndt; Kevin Korona; Alexander Roediger; Ben Heber; Germany	1:37.72	Nico Walther; Andreas Bredau; Marko Hübenbecker; Christian Poser; Germany	1:37.74	Oskars Melbārdis; Daumants Dreiškens; Arvis Vilkaste; Jānis Strenga; Latvia	1:37.86
St.Moritz	Oskars Melbārdis; Daumants Dreiškens; Arvis Vilkaste; Jānis Strenga; Latvia	2:09.73	Francesco Friedrich; Gregor Bermach; Martin Grothkopp; Thorsten Margis; Germany	2:09.91	Maximilian Arndt; Jan Speer; Alexander Roediger; Martin Putze; Germany	2:10.11
La Plagne	Oskars Melbārdis; Daumants Dreiškens; Arvis Vilkaste; Jānis Strenga; Latvia	1:56.61	Alexander Kasjanov; Ilvir Huzin; Aleksei Pushkarev; Aleksey Zaytsev; Russia	1:56.89	Francesco Friedrich; Candy Bauer; Martin Grothkopp; Thorsten Margis; Germany	1:57.13
Igls	Oskars Melbārdis; Daumants Dreiškens; Arvis Vilkaste; Jānis Strenga; Latvia	1:42.01	Francesco Friedrich; Candy Bauer; Martin Grothkopp; Thorsten Margis; Germany	1:42.14	Nico Walther; Marko Hübenbecker; Andreas Bredau; Christian Poser; Germany	1:42.31
Sochi	Oskars Melbārdis; Daumants Dreiškens; Arvis Vilkaste; Jānis Strenga; Latvia	1:50.03	Alexander Kasjanov; Ilvir Huzin; Aleksei Pushkarev; Aleksey Zaytsev; Russia	1:50.05	Maximilian Arndt; Alexander Roediger; Ben Heber; Martin Putze; Germany	1:50.67

=== Women's two bob ===
Event:	Gold:	Time	Silver:	Time	Bronze:	Time
Lake Placid	Elana Meyers; Cherrelle Garrett; United States	1:52.68	Jazmine Fenlator; Natalie DeRatt; United States	1:53.80	Jamie Greubel; Lauren Gibbs; United States	1:54.04
Calgary	Elana Meyers; Cherrelle Garrett; United States	1:51.76	Anja Schneiderheinze; Franziska Bertels; Germany	1:52.21	Kaillie Humphries; Kate O'Brien; Canada	1:52.65
Altenberg	Elana Meyers; Cherrelle Garrett; United States	1:55.38	Elfje Willemsen; Annelies Holthof; Belgium	1:55.49	Kaillie Humphries; Melissa Lotholz; Canada	1:55.73
Königssee	Cathleen Martini; Lisa Marie Buckwitz; Germany	1:41.88	Elfje Willemsen; Annelies Holthof; Belgium	1:41.92	Anja Schneiderheinze; Annika Drazek; Germany	1:41.96
St.Moritz	Anja Schneiderheinze; Annika Drazek; Germany	2:15.29	Cathleen Martini; Franziska Bertels; Germany	2:15.60	Jamie Greubel; Cherrelle Garrett; United States	2:15.86
La Plagne	Elana Meyers; Cherrelle Garrett; United States	2:01.93	Jamie Greubel; Lauryn Williams; United States	2:02.17	Kaillie Humphries; Melissa Lotholz; Canada	2:02.44
Igls	Elana Meyers; Lauryn Williams; United States	1:46.48	Anja Schneiderheinze; Annika Drazek; Germany	1:46.55	Jamie Greubel; Cherrelle Garrett; United States	1:47.45
Sochi	Elana Meyers; Lauryn Williams; United States	1:55.48	Kaillie Humphries; Melissa Lotholz; Canada	1:56.09	Jamie Greubel; Lauren Gibbs; United States	1:56.10

== Standings ==
=== 2-men ===
Pos.	Bobsledder	LKP	CAL	ALT	KON	STM	LPL	IGL	SOC	Points
1	Oskars Melbārdis (LAT)	2	1	2	5	1	2	2	2	1684
2	Beat Hefti (SUI)	4	3	1	1	2	5	3	3	1636
3	Rico Peter (SUI)	5	6	4	9	7	3	4	1	1449
4	Francesco Friedrich (GER)	1	2	5	7	4	1	1	–	1429
5	Nico Walther (GER)	11	7	3	2	8	7	4	10	1378
6	Steven Holcomb (USA)	6	8	13	10	6	8	6	5	1296
7	Alexander Kasjanov (RUS)	10	4	6	14	15	4	7	7	1256
8	Justin Kripps (CAN)	7	9	9	3	18	10	8	4	1248
9	Nick Cunningham (USA)	3	13	15	13	20	11	13	9	1020
10	Codie Bascue (USA)	13	11	7	15	13	16	16	11	976
11	Won Yun-jong (KOR)	8	5	–	8	14	6	10	–	936
12	Oskars Ķibermanis (LAT)	12	14	8	11	11	13	12	–	920
13	Alexey Stulnev (RUS)	18	15	14	6	9	–	15	6	904
14	Chris Spring (CAN)	14	12	16	12	16	17	14	14	872
15	Johannes Lochner (GER)	–	–	–	–	5	9	5	8	680
16	Maxim Andrianov (RUS)	–	–	10	22	–	18	17	13	488
17	Nikita Zakharov (RUS)	15	17	–	–	10	15	–	–	440
18	Maximilian Arndt (GER)	8	10	–	–	–	–	–	12	432
19	Kim Dong-hyun (KOR)	17	16	–	–	19	24	23	–	353
20	Uģis Žaļims (LAT)	–	–	–	–	2	–	11	–	346

=== 4-men ===
Pos.	Bobsledder	LKP	CAL	ALT	KON	STM	LPL	IGL	SOC	Points
1	Oskars Melbārdis (LAT)	3	1	2	3	1	1	1	1	1735
2	Alexander Kasjanov (RUS)	2	8	5	6	9	2	4	2	1494
3	Maximilian Arndt (GER)	1	3	DNF	1	3	5	6	3	1410
4	Nico Walther (GER)	DNF	5	1	2	4	4	3	6	1379
5	Francesco Friedrich (GER)	14	2	6	4	2	3	2	–	1310
6	Rico Peter (SUI)	7	9	3	7	11	6	5	15	1288
7	Steven Holcomb (USA)	6	7	9	9	14	8	9	9	1224
8	Justin Kripps (CAN)	4	11	7	12	21	13	11	4	1134
9	Chris Spring (CAN)	10	10	10	14	16	12	13	10	1032
10	Oskars Ķibermanis (LAT)	10	DNF	4	5	7	7	8	–	1016
11	Nikita Zakharov (RUS)	8	4	–	–	6	11	9	5	1000
12	Nick Cunningham (USA)	5	12	16	13	15	19	15	7	978
13	Alexey Stulnev (RUS)	13	14	13	10	13	–	14	8	888
14	Codie Bascue (USA)	9	–	12	16	12	15	19	–	682
15	Lamin Deen (GBR)	12	5	–	11	23	–	7	–	666
16	Benjamin Maier (AUT)	–	–	15	8	8	9	17	–	664
17	Jan Vrba (CZE)	–	–	11	–	10	10	12	–	552
18	Kaillie Humphries (CAN)	–	15	-	18	19	20	24	14	483
19	Won Yun-jong (KOR)	–	13	-	20	16	18	21	–	426
20	Simone Bertazzo (ITA)	–	–	14	–	5	–	15	–	400

=== 2-woman ===
Pos.	Bobsledder	LKP	CAL	ALT	KON	STM	LPL	IGL	SOC	Points
1	Elana Meyers (USA)	1	1	1	6	4	1	1	1	1718
2	Kaillie Humphries (CAN)	5	3	3	5	7	3	6	2	1522
3	Jazmine Fenlator (USA)	2	4	9	4	8	4	4	5	1474
4	Elfje Willemsen (BEL)	6	6	2	2	5	8	9	4	1460
5	Anja Schneiderheinze (GER)	4	2	7	3	1	5	2	–	1389
6	Jamie Greubel (USA)	3	4	5	DNF	3	2	3	3	1386
7	Stefanie Szczurek (GER)	7	7	6	8	10	7	7	9	1304
8	Cathleen Martini (GER)	–	–	4	1	2	6	5	7	1155
9	Nadezhda Sergeeva (RUS)	10	10	13	12	13	11	13	8	1072
10	Mica McNeill (GBR)	9	9	12	11	12	–	10	–	840
11	Victoria Olaoye (GBR)	8	8	–	10	15	14	11	–	816
12	Christina Hengster (AUT)	–	–	10	7	9	9	8	–	776
13	Aleksandra Rodionova (RUS)	–	–	–	–	11	10	12	6	584
14	An Vannieuwenhuyse (BEL)	–	–	11	13	–	13	16	–	472
15	Marije van Huigenbosch (NED)	–	–	–	9	14	15	–	–	368
16	Maria Adela Constantin (ROU)	–	–	8	–	16	–	14	–	368
17	Edith Burkard (SUI)	–	–	–	–	6	12	–	–	304
18	Martina Fontanive (SUI)	–	–	–	–	17	–	15	–	192
19	Alysia Rissling (CAN)	–	11	–	–	–	–	–	–	136
20	Fabiana Santos (BRA)	11	–	–	–	–	–	–	–	136
