= FIBT World Championships 2015 – Four-man =

Four-man at the FIBT World Championships 2015
- Venue: Winterberg bobsleigh, luge, and skeleton track, Winterberg
- Date: 7–8 March 2015
- Competitors: 112 from 28 nations
- Winning time: 3:34.89

Medalists
| gold medal | Maximilian Arndt; Alexander Rödiger; Kevin Korona; Ben Heber | Germany |
| silver medal | Nico Walther; Andreas Bredau; Marko Hübenbecker; Christian Poser | Germany |
| bronze medal | Oskars Melbārdis; Daumants Dreiškens; Arvis Vilkaste; Jānis Strenga | Latvia |

FIBT World Championships 2015 /
| Two | men | | women |
| Four | men |
| Skeleton | men | | women |
| Mixed | | team |

The Four-man event of the FIBT World Championships 2015 was held on 7–8 March 2015.

== Results ==
The first two runs were started on 7 March at 13:15 and the last two runs on 8 March at 15:00.

| Rank | Bib | Country | Athletes | Run 1 | Run 2 | Run 3 | Run 4 | Total | Behind |
|---|---|---|---|---|---|---|---|---|---|
| 1st place, gold medalist(s) | 1 | Germany | Maximilian Arndt; Alexander Rödiger; Kevin Korona; Ben Heber | 53.83 | 53.78 | 53.53 | 53.75 | 3:34.89 | |
| 2nd place, silver medalist(s) | 5 | Germany | Nico Walther; Andreas Bredau; Marko Hübenbecker; Christian Poser | 53.83 | 53.86 | 53.48 | 53.74 | 3:34.91 | +0.02 |
| 3rd place, bronze medalist(s) | 3 | Latvia | Oskars Melbārdis; Daumants Dreiškens; Arvis Vilkaste; Jānis Strenga | 53.80 | 53.73 | 53.62 | 53.86 | 3:35.01 | +0.12 |
| 4 | 4 | Germany | Francesco Friedrich; Candy Bauer; Martin Grothkopp; Thorsten Margis | 53.98 | 53.69 | 53.64 | 53.75 | 3:35.06 | +0.17 |
| 5 | 16 | Great Britain | Lamin Deen; Ben Simons; Bruce Tasker; Andrew Matthews | 54.10 | 53.81 | 53.71 | 53.89 | 3:35.51 | +0.62 |
| 6 | 6 | Switzerland | Rico Peter; Bror van der Zijde; Thomas Amrhein; Simon Friedli | 54.01 | 53.96 | 53.73 | 53.86 | 3:35.56 | +0.67 |
| 7 | 2 | Russia | Alexander Kasjanov; Alexey Negodaylo; Ilvir Huzin; Aleksei Pushkarev | 54.03 | 54.03 | 53.96 | 54.07 | 3:36.09 | +1.20 |
| 8 | 10 | Canada | Chris Spring; Derek Plug; Alexander Kopacz; Lascelles Brown | 54.06 | 54.10 | 53.99 | 54.19 | 3:36.34 | +1.45 |
| 9 | 11 | United States | Steven Holcomb; Justin Olsen; Carlo Valdes; Samuel Michener | 54.20 | 54.09 | 54.02 | 54.10 | 3:36.41 | +1.52 |
| 10 | 17 | Czech Republic | Jan Vrba; Dominik Suchý; Dominik Dvořák; Jakub Nosek | 54.32 | 54.26 | 53.96 | 54.04 | 3:36.58 | +1.69 |
| 11 | 9 | Russia | Nikita Zakharov; Stanislav Neustroev; Kirill Antukh; Vasiliy Kondratenko | 54.30 | 54.26 | 54.15 | 53.92 | 3:36.72 | +1.83 |
| 11 | 14 | Russia | Alexey Stulnev; Maxim Mokrousov; Yury Selikhov; Aleksandr Soldatenkov | 54.28 | 54.39 | 54.13 | 53.92 | 3:36.72 | +1.83 |
| 13 | 8 | Canada | Justin Kripps; Timothy Randall; Bryan Barnett; Ben Coakwell | 54.14 | 54.38 | 54.02 | 54.02 | 3:36.74 | +1.85 |
| 14 | 12 | United States | Nick Cunningham; Adam Clark; Alex Harrison; James Reed | 54.35 | 54.41 | 54.36 | 54.06 | 3:37.18 | +2.29 |
| 15 | 7 | Latvia | Oskars Ķibermanis; Helvijs Lūsis; Raivis Zīrups; Vairis Leiboms | 54.34 | 54.28 | 54.41 | 54.16 | 3:37.19 | +2.30 |
| 16 | 21 | Germany | Christoph Hafer; Michael Salzer; Marc Rademacher; Jakob-Kilian Trenkler | 54.46 | 54.30 | 54.30 | 54.20 | 3:37.26 | +2.37 |
| 17 | 15 | Italy | Simone Bertazzo; Simone Fontana; Costantino Ughi; Francesco Costa | 54.56 | 54.43 | 54.41 | 54.41 | 3:37.81 | +2.92 |
| 18 | 13 | Austria | Benjamin Maier; Stefan Laussegger; Markus Sammer; Marco Rangl | 54.37 | 54.55 | 54.57 | 54.33 | 3:37.82 | +2.93 |
| 18 | 22 | South Korea | Won Yun-jong; Jun Jung-lin; Seo Young-woo; Kim Dong-hyun | 54.77 | 54.33 | 54.40 | 54.32 | 3:37.82 | +2.93 |
| 20 | 18 | United States | Codie Bascue; Casey Wickline; David Cremin; Adrian Adams | 54.60 | 54.50 | 54.49 | 54.39 | 3:37.98 | +3.09 |
| 21 | 26 | Czech Republic | Radek Matoušek; Jan Šindelář; Jan Stokláska; Michal Vacek | 54.61 | 54.51 | 54.61 | | | |
| 21 | 19 | France | Loïc Costerg; Romain Heinrich; Vincent Ricard; Jérémie Boutherin | 54.72 | 54.45 | 54.56 | | | |
| 23 | 24 | Serbia | Vuk Radenović; Petar Đurić; Aleksandar Krajišnik; Aleksandar Bundalo | 54.96 | 54.84 | 54.56 | | | |
| 24 | 23 | Romania | Dorin Grigore; Florin Craciun; Gabriel Salajan; Dănuț Moldovan | 55.06 | 54.83 | 55.03 | | | |
| 25 | 25 | Italy | Lukas Gschnitzer; Alessandro Grande; Rocco Caruso; Mattia Variola | 55.09 | 54.89 | 54.99 | | | |
| 26 | 28 | Netherlands | Jurriaan Wesselink; Tim Balvers; Rudy Mensink; Igor Brink | 55.22 | 55.26 | 55.23 | | | |
| 27 | 20 | Canada | Kaillie Humphries; Dan Dale; Joey Nemet; Joshua Kirkpatrick | 55.01 | 55.90 | 54.92 | | | |
| 28 | 27 | Poland | Mateusz Luty; Krzysztof Tylkowski; Filip Wieczorek; Grzegorz Kossakowski | 55.28 | 55.38 | 55.29 | | | |
