= FIBT World Championships 2015 – Two-man =

Bobsleigh & skeleton competition

Two-man at the FIBT World Championships 2015
- Venue: Winterberg bobsleigh, luge, and skeleton track, Winterberg
- Date: 27 February–1 March 2015
- Competitors: 66 from 33 nations
- Winning time: 3:43.30

Medalists
gold medal	Francesco Friedrich; Thorsten Margis	Germany
silver medal	Oskars Melbārdis; Daumants Dreiškens	Latvia
silver medal	Johannes Lochner; Joshua Bluhm	Germany

FIBT World Championships 2015 /
Two	men		women
Four	men
Skeleton	men		women
Mixed		team

The Two-man event of the FIBT World Championships 2015 was held on 27 February–1 March 2015.

== Results ==
The first two runs were started on 27 February at 13:05 and the last two runs on 1 March at 10:30.

Rank	Bib	Country	Athletes	Run 1	Run 2	Run 3	Run 4	Total	Behind
1st place, gold medalist(s)	4	Germany	Francesco Friedrich; Thorsten Margis	56.47	56.08	55.23	55.52	3:43.30	
2nd place, silver medalist(s)	2	Latvia	Oskars Melbārdis; Daumants Dreiškens	56.79	56.22	55.51	55.84	3:44.36	+1.06
2nd place, silver medalist(s)	9	Germany	Johannes Lochner; Joshua Bluhm	56.73	56.41	55.39	55.83	3:44.36	+1.06
4	3	Switzerland	Beat Hefti; Alex Baumann	56.92	56.38	55.36	55.86	3:44.52	+1.22
5	10	South Korea	Won Yun-jong; Seo Young-woo	56.63	56.46	55.66	55.94	3:44.69	+1.39
6	16	Latvia	Uģis Žaļims; Intars Dambis	56.62	56.41	55.74	55.93	3:44.70	+1.40
7	5	Switzerland	Rico Peter; Bror van der Zijde	56.84	56.34	55.63	55.90	3:44.71	+1.41
8	12	Latvia	Oskars Ķibermanis; Vairis Leiboms	56.89	56.50	55.73	55.96	3:45.08	+1.78
9	30	Germany	Richard Oelsner; Eric Franke	56.51	56.67	55.90	56.15	3:45.23	+1.93
10	6	Germany	Nico Walther; Marko Hübenbecker	56.97	56.59	55.79	55.91	3:45.26	+1.96
11	14	Russia	Alexey Stulnev; Kirill Antukh	56.89	56.54	56.16	55.92	3:45.51	+2.21
12	11	United States	Nick Cunningham; Alex Harrison	56.97	56.63	56.05	55.96	3:45.61	+2.31
13	18	Russia	Maxim Andrianov; Maxim Mokrousov	56.76	56.66	56.00	56.30	3:45.72	+2.42
14	21	Great Britain	Lamin Deen; Simeon Williamson	56.93	56.57	56.03	56.26	3:45.79	+2.49
15	8	Russia	Alexander Kasjanov; Aleksei Pushkarev	57.17	56.80	56.05	55.88	3:45.90	+2.60
16	17	Canada	Nick Poloniato; Bryan Barnett	56.93	56.65	56.42	56.09	3:46.09	+2.79
17	7	United States	Steven Holcomb; Carlo Valdes	57.10	57.27	55.89	56.08	3:46.34	+3.04
18	15	Canada	Christopher Spring; Derek Plug	57.34	56.80	56.27	56.07	3:46.48	+3.18
19	26	Poland	Mateusz Luty; Krzysztof Tylkowski	56.99	57.01	56.43	56.35	3:46.78	+3.48
20	20	France	Loïc Costerg; Romain Heinrich	56.93	56.90	56.60	56.54	3:46.97	+3.67
21	1	Canada	Justin Kripps; Lascelles Brown	57.58	56.68	56.19			
22	23	Austria	Benjamin Maier; Markus Sammer	56.98	57.45	56.50			
23	19	Monaco	Rudy Rinaldi; Boris Vain	57.04	57.43	56.64			
24	13	United States	Codie Bascue; Aaron Victorian	57.33	57.18	56.73			
25	24	Netherlands	Jurriaan Wesselink; Igor Brink	57.36	57.20	56.73			
26	31	Czech Republic	Radek Matoušek; Dominik Suchý	57.65	57.02	56.82			
27	27	Italy	Simone Fontana; Costantino Ughi	57.12	57.63	56.75			
28	32	Great Britain	Oliver Biddulph; Jordan Smallin	57.25	57.37	56.91			
29	25	Czech Republic	Jan Vrba; Jakub Nosek	57.25	57.53	56.81			
30	29	Serbia	Vuk Rađenović; Aleksandar Bundalo	57.25	57.54	56.96			
31	22	South Korea	Kim Dong-hyun; Jun Jung-lin	57.52	57.37	57.07			
32	28	Romania	Dorin Grigore; Florin Craciun	57.60	57.77	57.30			
33	33	Croatia	Dražen Silić; Mate Mezulić	59.41	59.78	59.51			
