= Bobsleigh at the 2014 Winter Olympics – Four-man =

Four-man at the XXII Olympic Winter Games
- Pictogram for bobsleigh
- Dates: 22–23 February 2014
- Competitors: 124 from 19 nations

Medalists
1st place, gold medalist(s)		Oskars Melbārdis; Arvis Vilkaste; Daumants Dreiškens; Jānis Strenga	Latvia
2nd place, silver medalist(s)		Steven Holcomb; Steven Langton; Curtis Tomasevicz; Christopher Fogt	United States
3rd place, bronze medalist(s)		John James Jackson; Bruce Tasker; Stuart Benson; Joel Fearon	Great Britain

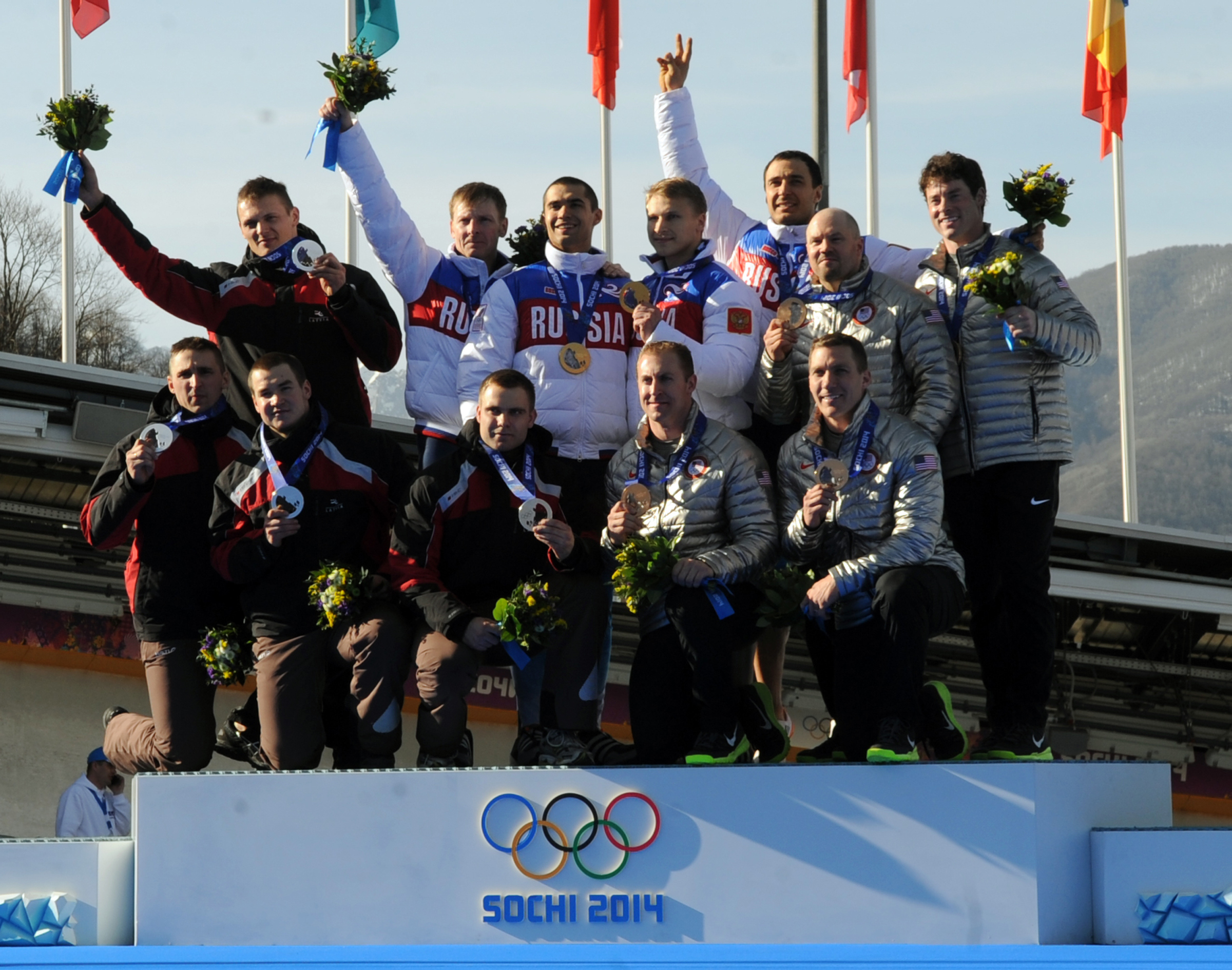
The original medalists.

The four-man bobsleigh competition at the 2014 Winter Olympics in Sochi, Russia was held at the Sliding Center Sanki near Krasnaya Polyana, Russia on 22–23 February 2014.

On 24 November 2017, the IOC imposed a life ban on bobsledder Alexandr Zubkov. He was stripped of 2 gold medals (two-man and four-man bobsleigh). On November 27 IOC imposed similar sanctions to members of the same team Dmitry Trunenkov and Alexey Negodaylo. On 29 November 2017, IOC also sanctioned Alexander Kasjanov, Ilvir Huzin and Aleksei Pushkarev for doping offences and stripped their team of results. On 18 December 2017, Alexey Voyevoda also received a lifetime ban from the Olympic Games due to doping violations at the 2014 Winter Olympics. The IOC requested that the FIBT modify the results, and the medals were redistributed accordingly.

== Records ==
While the IOC does not consider bobsled times eligible for Olympic records, the FIBT does maintain records for both the start and a complete run at each track it competes.

== Qualifying teams ==
A total of 30 teams from 19 NOCs qualified for the event:

Three teams

- Canada, Germany, and Russia.

Two teams

- France, Great Britain, South Korea, Latvia and United States.

One team

- Australia, Austria, Brazil, Czech Republic, Italy, Japan, Netherlands, Poland, Romania, Switzerland, and Slovakia.

== Results ==
SR = Start Record TR = Track Record

Rank	Bib	Country	Athletes	Run 1	Run 2	Run 3	Run 4	Total	Behind
1st place, gold medalist(s)	7	Latvia (LAT-1)	Oskars Melbārdis; Arvis Vilkaste; Daumants Dreiškens; Jānis Strenga	55.10	55.13	55.15	55.31	3:40.69	-
2nd place, silver medalist(s)	2	United States (USA-1)	Steven Holcomb; Steven Langton; Curtis Tomasevicz; Christopher Fogt	54.89	55.47	55.30	55.33	3:40.99	+0.30
3rd place, bronze medalist(s)	12	Great Britain (GBR-1)	John James Jackson; Bruce Tasker; Stuart Benson; Joel Fearon	55.26	55.27	55.31	55.26	3:41.10	+0.41
4	1	Germany (GER-1)	Maximilian Arndt; Alexander Rödiger; Marko Hübenbecker; Martin Putze	54.88; SR & TR	55.47	55.47	55.60	3:41.42	+0.71
5	4	Germany (GER-3)	Thomas Florschütz; Kevin Kuske; Joshua Bluhm; Christian Poser	55.06	55.42	55.50	55.53	3:41.51	+0.82
6	11	Switzerland (SUI-1)	Beat Hefti; Jürg Egger; Alex Baumann; Thomas Lamparter	55.21	55.34	55.60	55.60	3:41.75	+1.06
7	9	Canada (CAN-2)	Lyndon Rush; David Bissett; Lascelles Brown; Neville Wright	55.35	55.43	55.60	55.38	3:41.76	+1.07
8	8	Germany (GER-2)	Francesco Friedrich; Gregor Bermbach; Jannis Bäcker; Thorsten Margis	55.15	55.43	55.81	55.41	3:41.80	+1.11
9	14	Netherlands (NED-1)	Edwin van Calker; Sybren Jansma; Bror van der Zijde; Arno Klaassen	55.55	55.57	55.82	55.75	3:42.69	+2.00
10	13	United States (USA-2)	Nick Cunningham; Johnny Quinn; Justin Olsen; Dallas Robinson	55.61	55.48	55.97	55.64	3:42.70	+2.01
11	5	Canada (CAN-1)	Christopher Spring; James McNaughton; Timothy Randall; Bryan Barnett	55.50	56.70	55.88	55.76	3:42.84	+2.15
12	16	Latvia (LAT-2)	Oskars Ķibermanis; Helvijs Lūsis; Raivis Broks; Vairis Leiboms	55.68	55.52	55.97	55.81	3:42.98	+2.29
13	15	Russia (RUS-3)	Nikita Zakharov; Nikolay Khrenkov; Petr Moiseev; Maxim Mokrousov	55.74	55.53	55.88	55.91	3:43.06	+2.37
14	19	Czech Republic (CZE-1)	Jan Vrba; Dominik Dvořák; Dominik Suchý; Michal Vacek	55.95	55.47	55.95	55.80	3:43.17	+2.48
15	22	France (FRA-1)	Loïc Costerg; Florent Ribet; Romain Heinrich; Elly Lefort	55.82	55.68	55.91	55.77	3:43.18	+2.49
16	17	Italy (ITA-1)	Simone Bertazzo; Samuele Romanini; Simone Fontana; Francesco Costa	55.78	55.73	56.06	55.88	3:43.45	+2.76
17	18	Great Britain (GBR-2)	Lamin Deen; Andrew Matthews; John Baines; Ben Simons	55.91	55.60	56.06	55.95	3:43.52	+2.83
18	21	South Korea (KOR-1)	Won Yun-Jong; Jun Jung-Lin; Suk Young-Jin; Seo Young-Woo	56.12	55.97	56.25	55.88	3:44.22	+3.53
19	24	Austria (AUT-1)	Benjamin Maier; Markus Sammer; Stefan Withalm; Angel Somov; Sebastian Heufler	56.25	56.11	56.27	—	2:48.63	
20	23	Australia (AUS-1)	Heath Spence; Duncan Harvey; Gareth Nichols; Lucas Mata	56.20	56.21	56.23	—	2:48.64	
21	30	France (FRA-2)	Thibault Godefroy; Vincent Ricard; Jérémy Baillard; Jérémie Boutherin	56.37	56.27	56.35	—	2:48.99	
22	25	Romania (ROU-1)	Andreas Neagu; Paul Muntean; Florin Cezar Crăciun; Dănuț Moldovan; Bogdan Laurentiu Otava	56.25	56.16	56.62	—	2:49.03	
23	28	Slovakia (SVK-1)	Milan Jagnešák; Lukáš Kožienka; Petr Narovec; Juraj Mokráš	56.56	56.37	56.51	—	2:49.44	
24	20	Japan (JPN-1)	Hiroshi Suzuki; Shintaro Sato; Toshiki Kuroiwa; Hisashi Miyazaki	56.41	56.42	56.63	—	2:49.46	
25	29	South Korea (KOR-2)	Kim Dong-Hyun; Kim Sik; Kim Kyung-Hyun; Oh Jea-Han	56.98	56.77	56.89	—	2:50.64	
26	27	Brazil (BRA-1)	Edson Bindilatti; Edson Martins; Odirlei Pessoni; Fábio Gonçalves Silva	56.86	56.74	57.11	—	2:50.71	
27	10	Canada (CAN-3)	Justin Kripps; Cody Sorensen**; Jesse Lumsden; Ben Coakwell**; Luke Demetre; Graeme Rinholm	55.17	59.91*	55.72	—	2:50.80	
DSQ***	27	Poland (POL-1)	Dawid Kupczyk; Michał Kasperowicz; Daniel Zalewski; Paweł Mróz	~~56.57~~	~~56.45~~	~~56.47~~	—	~~2:49.49~~	
DSQ****	3	Russia (RUS-1)	Alexandr Zubkov; Dmitry Trunenkov; Alexey Negodaylo; Alexey Voyevoda	~~54.82 TR~~	~~55.37~~	~~55.02~~	~~55.39~~	~~3:40.60~~	
DSQ****	6	Russia (RUS-2)	Alexander Kasjanov; Maxim Belugin; Ilvir Huzin; Aleksei Pushkarev	~~55.11~~	~~55.41~~	~~55.29~~	~~55.21~~	~~3:41.02~~	

*Canada 3 crashed in the heat.
**According to run results Cody Sorensen and Ben Coakwell were replaced in run 3 by Luke Demetre and Graeme Rinholm.
*** Poland were disqualified in 2014 after Daniel Zalewski was banned for doping.
**** Russia 1 and Russia 2 were disqualified in 2019 after a review of doping samples which showed that Alexandr Zubkov, Alexander Kasyanov, Aleksei Pushkarev and Ilvir Khuzin had all tested positive for banned substances and were banned until 2020. On 18 September 2019, NBC Sports and the United States Olympic and Paralympic Committee announced the reallocated silver medals were to be awarded at the 2019 USOPC awards ceremony in Los Angeles. The reallocated bronze medals were awarded at the 2019 Team GB Ball in London.
