= Königssee bobsleigh, luge, and skeleton track =

Sports venue in Schönau am Königssee, Germany

Coordinates: 47.5887°N 12.9812°E

Location in Germany
Location in Bavaria

Königssee track map

The Königssee bobsleigh, luge, and skeleton track is a venue in Germany for bobsleigh, luge and skeleton, located in Schönau am Königssee, Bavaria, near Königssee (German for "King's Lake") and the border with Austria. Completed 58 years ago in 1968, it is the first permanent, artificially refrigerated bobsleigh, luge, and skeleton track in the world. In July 2021, the track was severely damaged by the floods that affected the European continent, and is currently under reconstruction.

== History ==
In 1967, Königssee hosted the European luge championships on a naturally refrigerated track. Later that year, it was decided to construct a permanent, reinforced concrete structure that was artificially refrigerated. The track, initially for luge, was completed in 1968. The first international competition took place the following year with the FIL World Luge Championships.

On 3–4 December 1977, the track hosted the first Luge World Cup event won by Paul Hildgartner (Italy - men's singles), Andrea Fendt (West Germany - women's singles), and Italy's Peter Gschnitzer and Karl Brunner (men's doubles).

Bobsleigh was added to the track in the 1970s in time for the track to host their sports' championship event in 1979, the first time any track would host both bobsleigh and luge in the same year in a non-Winter Olympic year (the track in Igls, Austria, was the first to do this at the 1976 Winter Olympics in Innsbruck).

Skeleton competitions began in the late 1970s, hosting the world championships in 1990. The track was part of Salzburg, Austria's unsuccessful bid for the 2014 Winter Olympics in 2007. In October 2008, it was announced that the track would undergo a renovation project from 2010 to 2016. Costing € 21.7 million to do, the track is being done in part of Munich's bid to host the 2018 Winter Olympics. Renovation includes extending the finish line and a new building near turn 16 and is scheduled to be complete by 2012. The starting area of the track will be started in 2014 and will finish in 2016. On 28 February 2009, it was announced the track would host the 2011 FIBT World Championships after the original winner, Cortina d'Ampezzo, withdrew due to issues with the city and the track. The 29th and last Luge World Cup at the track prior to renovation took place on 2–3 January 2010. Bobsleigh and Skeleton had their last World Cup prior to renovation the following weekend.

Track renovation was done during the rest of 2010. At the end of March 2010, the Turbodrom Kreisel turn caught fire following some welding work and was badly damaged. Renovation of the refrigeration plant was carried out in December 2010 with ammonia being pumped in on the 18th. Olympic champion Felix Loch made the first run on the luge part of the track on the 23rd in time for the World Cup event on 5–6 January 2011. The renovation was also done for the 2011 FIBT World Championships that took place in late February.

In 2021, the track was severely damaged by the flooding across Europe. According to BSD (German Bobsleigh and Luge Association) President Thomas Schwab, it would take until October 2022 before the track will return to competition status. There was no ammonia refrigeration leak though to the piping being shut off to the end of the season.

On April 22, 2024, work began on the reconstruction of the bobsleigh, luge, and skeleton track with the dismantling of the men's luge start as well as the damaged track segments down to curve 5. The construction phase of the bedload dosing barrier, ammonia and long-distance lines will start in October 2024 and repair work on the Bobstart building in early 2025.

The artificial track at Königssee was scheduled to reopen in November 2025, with FIL and IBSF World Cups being hosted again starting with the 2025/2026 season. In addition, on June 15, 2024, at the congress in Lake Placid, the FIL awarded the 2028 Luge World Championships to the track at Königssee.

On July 11, 2025, the German Bobsleigh and Luge Association (BSD) announced that the artificial ice track at Königssee would not be available for competitions in the 2025/26 season due to defects in the refrigerant pipeline and would not resume operations until November 2026. The FIL and IBSF World Cup events planned for the 2025/26 season, as well as the Skeleton Junior World Championships, had to be rescheduled as a result.

== Statistics ==
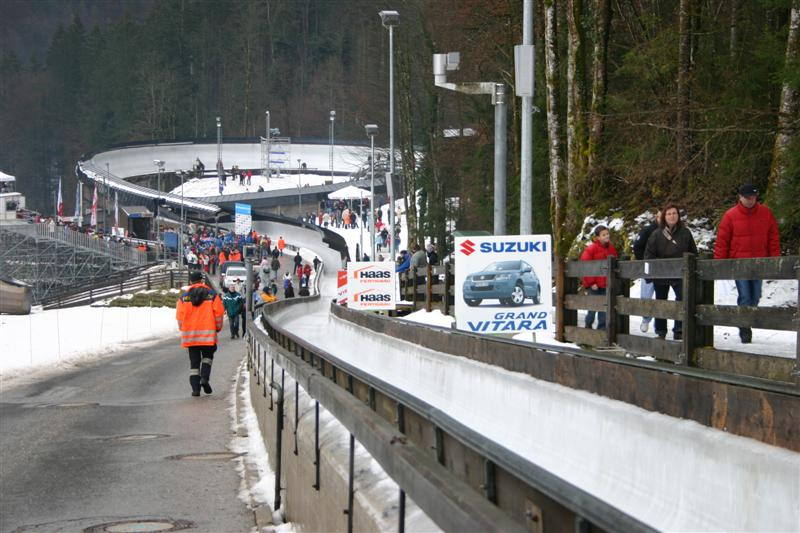
Ice rink at Königssee

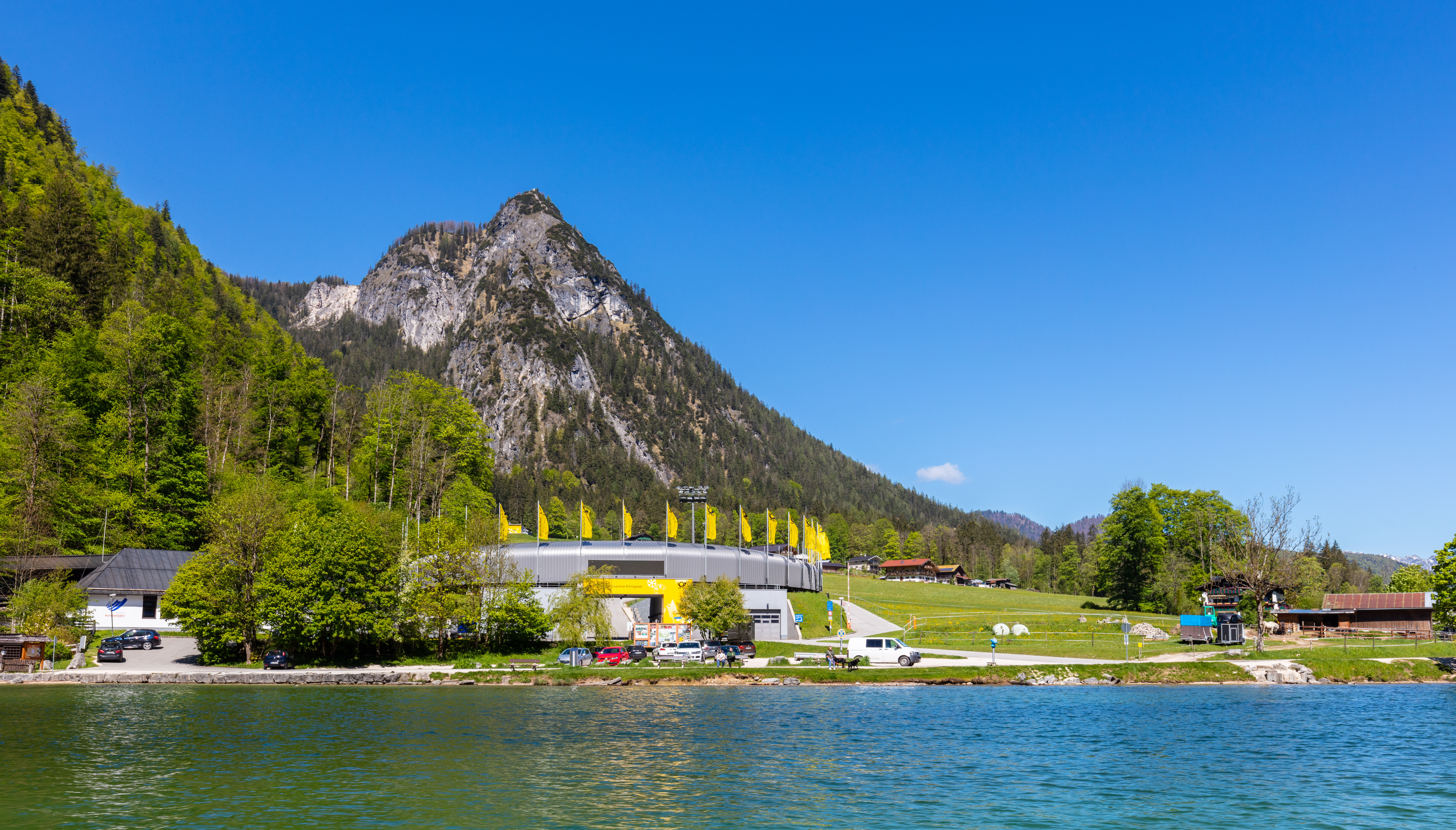
Deutsche Post Eisarena Königssee.

Physical statistics
Sport	Length	Turns	Grade
Luge - men's singles	1.332 km (0.83 mi)	16	10.35%
Skeleton	1.244 km (0.77 mi)	12	9.20%
Bobsleigh	1.244 km (0.77 mi)	12	9.30%
Luge - women's singles	1.216 km (0.76 mi)	12	9.20%
Luge - men's doubles	1.216 km (0.76 mi)	12	9.20%

The track has a vertical drop of 117 metres (384 ft) from the bobsleigh start; the elevation at the base is 630 m (2,065 ft) above sea level.

Turns
Turn number	Name	Reason named
1	Watzmannkurve	Named after the famous landmark mountain.
2	Grünsteinkurve	Named after the adjoining mountain to the west.
3	Brückenkurve	German for "Bridge curve".
5	Teufelsmühle	German for "Devil's mill".
6, 7, 8, 9	Schlangengrube/ S-Kombination	German for "Snake pit"/ S-combination in (in German) (Four turns in quick succession without a straight (labyrinth))
10.	Jenerkurve	Named after the mountain to the east.
11.	Turbodrom	320-degree Kreisel (circular) curve.
12.	Kehlsteinkurve	Named after the well known mountain housing the "Eagles's Nest".
13.	Josef Fendt Kurve	Originally Echowand and later Seekurve (Lake curve), renamed in November 2020 for Fendt, who served as International Luge Federation president from February 1994 to November 2020. Fendt won World Championships on this track both in 1970 and 1974.
14.	Echowand	German for "Echo wall".
15, 16	Zielkurve	German for "Finish curve".

Turn 4 has no name listed in the track diagram.

Track records (all from unless noted)
Sport	Record	Nation	Athlete(s)	Date	Time (sec.)
Bobsleigh - two-man	Start	Switzerland	Beat Hefti & Thomas Lamparter	10 Jan 2009	4.80
Bobsleigh - two-man	Track	Germany	André Lange & Kevin Kuske	9 Jan 2010	49.00
Bobsleigh - two-woman	Start	Canada	Kaillie Humphries & Heather Moyse	9 Jan 2010	5.25
Bobsleigh - two-woman	Track	Germany	Cathleen Martini & Romy Logsch	9 Jan 2010	50.37
Bobsleigh - four-man	Start	Latvia	Oskars Melbārdis, Helvijs Lūsis, Arvis Vilkaste, & Jānis Strenga	15 Jan 2012	4.77
Bobsleigh - four-man	Track	Germany	André Lange, Kevin Kuske, René Hoppe, & Alexander Metzger	3 Feb 2008	48.38
Luge - men's singles	Start	Germany	(tie) - David Möller & Jan Eichhorn	6 Jan 2008	3.229
Luge - men's singles	Track	Russia	Albert Demtschenko	3 Jan 2010	47.049
Luge - women's singles	Start	Germany	Silke Kraushaar	8 Jan 2005	2.962
Luge - women's singles	Track	Germany	Tatjana Hüfner	5 Jan 2008	47.262
Luge - men's doubles	Start	Germany	Tobias Wendl & Tobias Arlt	2 Jan 2010	2.847
Luge - men's doubles	Track	Germany	Patric Leitner & Alexander Resch	5 Jan 2008	46.921
Skeleton - men	Start	Russia	Aleksandr Tretyakov	2 Feb 2008	4.56
Skeleton - men	Track	Germany	Frank Rommel	9 Jan 2009	47.44
Skeleton - women	Start	Canada	Lindsay Alcock	28 Feb 2004	4.96
Skeleton - women	Track	Canada	Mellisa Hollingsworth	8 Jan 2010	48.78

== Championships hosted ==
- FIBT World Championships: 1979, 1986, 1990 (men's skeleton), 2004 (all bobsleigh and skeleton events), 2011, 2017
- FIL European Luge Championships: 1967 (As a natural track.), 1972, 1973, 1977, 1988, 1994, 2017
- FIL World Luge Championships: 1969, 1970, 1974, 1979, 1999, 2016, 2021
