= Oskars Melbārdis =

Latvian bobsledder

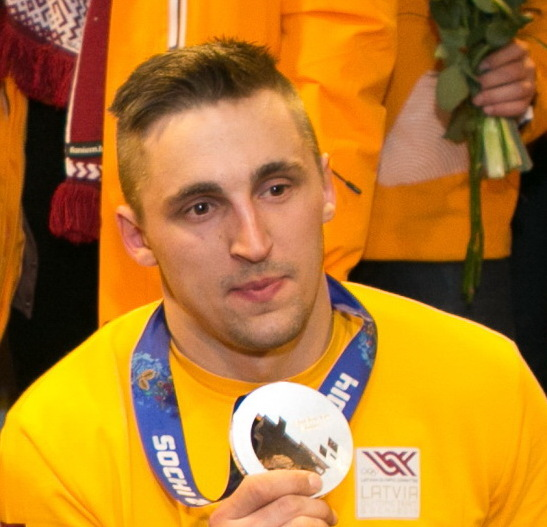
- Melbārdis in 2014 on his return from the 2014 Winter Olympics

Personal information
- Nationality: Latvian
- Born: 16 February 1988 (age 38) Valmiera, Latvian SSR, Soviet Union (now Valmiera, Latvia)
- Height: 1.90 m (6 ft 3 in)

Sport
- Country: Latvia
- Sport: Bobsleigh
- Team: Latvian National Team
- Turned pro: 2006
- Coached by: Sandis Prūsis
- Retired: 2021

Achievements and titles
- Olympic finals: (2014)
- World finals: (2016)
- Highest world ranking: 1st (2015)
Medal record
Olympic Games
| Gold medal – first place | 2014 Sochi | Four-man |
| Bronze medal – third place | 2014 Sochi | Two-man |
| Bronze medal – third place | 2018 Pyeongchang | Two-man |
World Championships
| Gold medal – first place | 2016 Igls | Four-man |
| Silver medal – second place | 2015 Winterberg | Two-man |
| Bronze medal – third place | 2009 Lake Placid | Four-man |
| Bronze medal – third place | 2015 Winterberg | Four-man |
European Championship
| Gold medal – first place | 2008 Cesena | Four-man |
| Gold medal – first place | 2015 La Plagne | Four-man |
| Silver medal – second place | 2015 La Plagne | Two-man |
| Bronze medal – third place | 2016 St. Moritz | Four-man |
| Bronze medal – third place | 2018 Igls | Four-man |

Oskars Melbārdis (born 16 February 1988) is a former Latvian bobsledder who has competed since 2006. He is the most successful bobsledder in the history of his country, having won one gold and two bronze Olympic medals. He also earned the first-ever gold medal for Latvia at World Championships in Igls, preceded by one silver and two bronze medals in 2009–2015.

== Career review ==
Melbārdis started his career as a brakeman, most notably competing along Jānis Miņins, however starting from 2010–11 season Melbārdis has been competing as a pilot. He won a gold medal in the four-man event at the FIBT World Championships 2016 in Igls, Austria with teammates Daumants Dreiškens, Arvis Vilkaste and Jānis Strenga. It was the first ever World Championships gold medal in bobsled for Latvia.

He won a silver medal in the two-man event at the FIBT World Championships 2015 in Winterberg and two bronze medals in the four-man events at the FIBT World Championships 2009 in Lake Placid, New York, and at the FIBT World Championships 2015.

He won a gold medal at the 2014 Winter Olympics in the four-man event in Sochi and won a bronze medal in the two-man event.

He won Bobsleigh European Championship four-man events in 2008 and 2015 and finished 3rd in the four-man event in 2016 and 2018. Melbārdis also finished 2nd in the two-man event in the 2015 Bobsleigh European Championship.

Melbārdis won a combined Bobsleigh World Cup title in 2012–13 and 2014–15. He won two-man and four-man World Cup titles in 2014–15 when he had 15 (from 16) podium finishes in two-man and four-man events, including seven first places.

== Highlights ==
=== Bob-Pilot ===
- (Not complete list of results)

==== World Championships ====
2016 – Igls, 1st at 4-bob
2015 – Winterberg, 2nd at 2-bob
2015 – Winterberg, 3rd at 4-bob
2013 – St. Moritz, 5th at 2-bob with Dreiškens
2013 – St. Moritz, 9th at 4-bob with Dreiškens / Vilkaste / Strenga
2012 – Lake Placid, 8th at 2-bob with Dreiškens

==== World Cup ====
2013/14 – Igls, 1st (gold) at 4-bob with Dreiškens / Vilkaste / Strenga
2013/14 – St. Moritz, 1st (gold) at 4-bob with Dreiškens / Vilkaste / Strenga
2012/13 – Sochi, 1st (gold) at 4-bob with Dreiškens / Vilkaste / Strenga
2012/13 – Sochi, 3rd (bronze) at 2-bob with Dreiškens
2012/13 – Königssee, 2nd (silver) at 2-bob with Dreiškens
2012/13 – Winterberg, 3rd (bronze) at 4-bob Dreiškens / Vilkaste / Strenga
2012/13 – Park City, 4th at 2-bob with Dreiškens
2011/12 – Calgary, 4th at 4-bob with Lūsis / Vilkaste / Strenga
2011–12 – Königssee, 4th at 4-bob with Lūsis / Vilkaste / Strenga
2011/12 – Winterberg, 3rd (bronze) at 4-bob with Lūsis / Vilkaste / Strenga
2011/12 – Winterberg, 3rd (bronze) at 2-bob with Dreiškens
2011/12 – Igls, 4th at 2-bob with Dreiškens

==== European Championships ====
2015 – La Plagne, 1st at 4-bob
2015 – La Plagne 2nd at 2-bob

==== Junior World Championships ====
2012 – Igls, 1st at 2-bob with Strenga
2012 – Igls, 1st at 4-bob with Lūsis / Vilkaste / Strenga

=== Brakeman ===
==== World Championships ====
2009 – Lake Placid, 3rd at 4-bob with Miņins / Dreiškens / Dambis

==== World Cup ====
2009/10 – Park City, 2nd (silver) at 4-bob with Miņins / Dreiškens / Dambis
2008/09 – Park City, 2nd (silver) at 4-bob with Miņins / Dreiškens / Dambis
2008–09 – Park City, 2nd (silver) at 4-bob with Miņins / Dreiškens / Dambis
2008/09 – Whistler, 1st (gold) at 4-bob with Miņins / Dreiškens / Dambis
2008/09 – Königssee, 3rd (bronze) at 4-bob with Miņins / Dreiškens / Dambis
2007/08 – Winterberg, 3rd (bronze) at 4-bob with Miņins / Dreiškens / Dambis
2007/08 – St. Moritz, 1st (gold) at 4-bob with Miņins / Dreiškens / Dambis
2007/08 – Cesana, 1st (gold) at 4-bob with Miņins / Dreiškens / Dambis

==== European Championships ====
2008 – Cesana, 1st at 4-bob with Miņins / Dreiškens / Dambis

== Career results ==
=== Olympic Games ===
- 3 medals (1 gold, 2 bronze)

| Event | Two-man | Four-man |
Representing Latvia
| (Russia) 2014 Sochi | 3 | 1 |
| (South Korea) 2018 Pyeongchang | 3 | 5 |

=== Season titles ===
- 4 globes (2 overall, 1 two-man, 1 four-man)

Season
| Season | Discipline |
| 2013 | Combined |
| 2015 | Combined |
| 2015 | Two-man |
| 2015 | Four-man |

==== Two-man ====
| Season | Place | Points | 1 | 2 | 3 | 4 | 5 | 6 | 7 | 8 | 9 |
|---|---|---|---|---|---|---|---|---|---|---|---|
| 2010–11 | 21st | 780 | WHI — | CAL — | PKC — | LKP — | IGL; 17 | WIN — | STM; 9 | CES; 14 | |
| 2011–12 | 7th | 1360 | IGL; 4 | LPL; 9 | WIN; 3 | ALT; 6 | KON; 9 | STM; 9 | WHI — | CAL; 6 | |
| 2012–13 | 2nd | 1674 | LKP; 8 | PKC; 4 | WHI; 14 | WIN; 7 | LPL; 5 | ALT; 5 | KON; 2 | IGL; 4 | SOC; 3 |
| 2013–14 | 12th | 1080 | CAL; 5 | PKC; 6 | LKP1; 10 | LKP2; 10 | WIN; 10 | STM; 13 | IGL; 7 | KON; DSQ | |
| 2014–15 | 1st | 1684 | LKP; 2 | CAL; 1 | ALT; 2 | KON; 5 | STM; 1 | LPL; 2 | IGL; 2 | SOC; 2 | |
| 2015–16 | 5th | 1334 | ALT; 2 | WIN; 2 | KON1; 2 | LPL — | WHI1; 5 | WHI2; 4 | STM; 10 | KON2; 5 | |
| 2016–17 | 16th | 810 | WHI — | LPL — | ALT; 13 | WIN — | STM; 6 | KON; 6 | IGL; 2 | PYE; 12 | |
| 2017–18 | 8th | 1130 | LPL1; 14 | LPL2; 11 | WHI; 3 | WIN; 10 | IGL; 9 | ALT; 21 | STM; 13 | KON; 5 | |
| 2018–19 | — | — | SIG1 — | SIG2 — | ALT — | KON — | IGL — | STM — | LPL — | CGR — | |
| 2019–20 | 30th | 184 | LPL1 — | LPL2 — | LPG — | IGL — | KON — | STM — | SIG1 — | SIG2; 5 | |

==== Four-man ====
| Season | Place | Points | 1 | 2 | 3 | 4 | 5 | 6 | 7 | 8 | 9 |
|---|---|---|---|---|---|---|---|---|---|---|---|
| 2010–11 | 25th | 88 | WHI — | CAL — | PKC — | LKP — | IGL — | WIN — | STM; DSQ | CES; 17 | |
| 2011–12 | 5th | 1216 | IGL; 8 | LPL; 10 | WIN; 3 | ALT; 7 | KON; 4 | STM; 8 | WHI — | CAL; 4 | |
| 2012–13 | 2nd | 1625 | LKP; 8 | PKC; 10 | WHI; 9 | WIN; 3 | LPL; 5 | ALT; 4 | KON; 5 | IGL; 5 | SOC; 1 |
| 2013–14 | 6th | 1228 | CAL; DSQ | PKC; 4 | LKP1; 5 | LKP2; 6 | WIN; 23 | STM; 1 | IGL; 1 | KON; 6 | |
| 2014–15 | 1st | 1735 | LKP; 3 | CAL; 1 | ALT; 2 | KON; 3 | STM; 1 | LPL; 1 | IGL; 1 | SOC; 1 | |
| 2015–16 | 12th | 904 | ALT; 8 | WIN; 5 | KON1; 6 | LPL — | WHI1 — | WHI2 — | STM; 3 | KON2; 5 | |
| 2016–17 | 13th | 931 | WHI — | LPL — | ALT; 11 | WIN — | STM; 2 | KON; 7 | IGL; 1 | PYE; 4 | |
| 2017–18 | 5th | 1322 | PAC1; 4 | PAC2; 7 | WHI; 14 | WIN; 12 | IGL; 4 | ALT; 7 | STM; 9 | KON; 2 | |
| 2018–19 | — | — | WIN1 — | WIN2 — | ALT — | KON — | IGL — | STM — | LPL — | CGR — | |
| 2019–20 | — | — | LPL1 — | LPL2 — | WIN1 — | WIN2 — | LPG — | IGL — | KON — | STM — | |

Awards
| Preceded by Kristaps Porziņģis | Latvian Sportspersman of the Year; 2018 | Succeeded by Martins Dukurs |
