= IBSF World Championships 2016 =

Bobsleigh and skeleton competition

2016 World Championships
- Venue: Olympic Sliding Centre Innsbruck
- Location: Igls, Austria
- Dates: February 8 – 21

The IBSF World Championships 2016 took place at the Olympic Sliding Centre Innsbruck in Igls, Austria, from 8 to 21 February 2016.

== Schedule ==
Six events were held.

All times are local (UTC+1).

Date	Time	Events
12 February	16:45	Two-women run 1 and 2
13 February	09:30	Two-men run 1 and 2
13 February	15:00	Two-women run 3 and 4
14 February	09:30	Two-men run 3 and 4
14 February	15:00	Mixed team
18 February	09:30	Men run 1 and 2
19 February	09:45	Women run 1 and 2
19 February	15:30	Men run 3 and 4
20 February	09:45	Women run 3 and 4
20 February	15:30	Four-men run 1 and 2
21 February	15:00	Four-men run 3 and 4

== Medal summary ==
=== Medal table ===
Rank	Nation	Gold	Silver	Bronze	Total
1	Germany	4	2	1	7
2	Latvia	2	0	0	2
3	Austria	0	2	0	2
4	Russia	0	1	1	2
5	Canada	0	1	0	1
5	South Korea	0	1	0	1
7	Switzerland	0	0	2	2
8	United States	0	0	1	1
Totals (8 entries)		6	7	5	18

=== Bobsleigh ===
Event	Gold		Silver		Bronze	
Two-man	Germany; Francesco Friedrich; Thorsten Margis	3:26.09	Germany; Johannes Lochner; Joshua Bluhm	3:26.26	Switzerland; Beat Hefti; Alex Baumann	3:26.31
Four-man	Latvia; Oskars Melbārdis; Daumants Dreiškens; Arvis Vilkaste; Jānis Strenga	3:24.27	Germany; Francesco Friedrich; Arndt Bauer; Gregor Bermbach; Thorsten Margis	3:24.31	Switzerland; Rico Peter; Bror van der Zijde; Thomas Amrhein; Simon Friedli	3:24.49
Two-woman	Germany; Anja Schneiderheinze-Stöckel; Annika Drazek	3:32.38	Canada; Kaillie Humphries; Melissa Lotholz	3:32.71	United States; Elana Meyers Taylor; Lauren Gibbs	3:32.87

=== Skeleton ===
Event	Gold		Silver		Bronze	
Men	Martins Dukurs; Latvia	3:28.84	Aleksandr Tretyakov; Russia; Yun Sung-bin; South Korea	3:29.97	not awarded	
Women	Tina Hermann; Germany	3:36.50	Janine Flock; Austria	3:36.96	Elena Nikitina; Russia	3:37.09

=== Mixed ===
Event	Gold		Silver		Bronze	
Mixed team	Germany; Axel Jungk; Anja Schneiderheinze-Stöckel; Franziska Bertels; Tina Hermann; Johannes Lochner; Tino Paasche	3:31.47	Austria; Matthias Guggenberger; Christina Hengster; Sanne Dekker; Janine Flock; Benjamin Maier; Dănuț Moldovan	3:32.93	Germany; Michael Zachrau; Stephanie Schneider; Anne Lobenstein; Jacqueline Lölling; Nico Walther; Jannis Bäcker	3:33.05
