= 2008 Latvian Athletics Championships =

- Edition: 18th
- Dates: 25–26 July
- Host city: Valmiera, Latvia

The 2008 Latvian Athletics Championships were held in Valmiera, Latvia on July 25–26, 2008.

== Men ==
Event	Gold		Silver		Bronze	
100 m	Māris Grēniņš	10.57	Sandis Sabajevs	10.68	Arvis Volkaste	11.16
200 m	Māris Grēniņš	21.80	Jānis Leitis	21.90	Henrijs Arājs	22.03
400 m	Valdis Iļjanovs	48.54	Mārtiņš Rozentāls	48.83	Kristaps Valters	49.50
800 m	Ģirts Āzis	1:50.15	Edvīns Purviņš	1:51.94	Valts Boginskis	1:54.83
1 500 m	Konstantīns Savčuks	3:54.21	Aleksejs Podšibjakins	4:03.67	Edgars Šumskis	4:06.46
3 000 m	Valērijs Žolnerovičs	8:14.82	Mareks Florošeks	8:17.98	Konstantīns Savčuks	8:26.13
5 000 m	Mareks Florošeks	15:25.10	Konstantīns Kožanovs	15:26.04	Artūrs Jukšs	16:21.52
4 x 100 m	Andris Ūdris; Valdis Iļjanovs; Mārtiņš Ralle; Arvis Vilkaste	42.57	Armands Annuškāns; Gatis Blūms; Jānis Karlivāns; Sandis Sabajevs	42.96	Edgars Čeporjus; Oļegs Saveiko; Reinis Ziemelis; Helvijs Lūsis	43.29
4 x 400 m	Valts Boginskis; Pauls Leikarts; Edvīns Purviņš; Gatis Spunde	3:20.65	Jānis Lācis; Jānis Klismets; Raivo Kaimiņš; Mārtiņš Rozentāls	3:24.44	Igors Saveiko; Artūrs Onzulis; Valts Baginskis; Igors Saveiko	3:26.04
110 m hurdles	Kārlis Daube	14.09	Armands Bērziņš	15.50	Sandis Metlovs	15.59
400 m hurdles	Gatis Spiunde	51.93	Valdis Iļjanovs	53.07	Andris Ūdris	53.97
3 000 m steeplechase	Mareks Moikiško	9:25.55	Kaspars Briška	9:37.02	Aigars Matisons	9:42.31
Triple Jump	Māris Grēniņš	16.13	Pāvels Kovaļovs	15.45	Guntis Bērziņš	14.51
Long Jump	Māris Grēniņš	7.80	Artūrs Āboliņš	7.50	Henrijs Arājs	7.47
High Jump	Normunds Pūpols	2.15	Toms Andersons	2.10	Nauris Bloks	2.00
Pole Vault	Mareks Ārents	5.00	Kārlis Pujāts	4.90	Pauls Pujāts	4.60
Shot Put	Māris Urtāns	19.48	Arnis Žviriņš	15.47	Ivars Logins	15.06
Hammer Throw	Igors Sokolovs	75.62	Ainārs Vaičulēns	59.88	Jevgēņijs Mokušins	55.19
Discus Throw	Oskars Siļčenoks	55.43	Jānis Karlivāns	48.37	Arnis Žviriņš	46.57
Javelin Throw	Vadims Vasiļevskis	82.39	Ainārs Kovals	79.22	Andis Anškins	74.57

== Women ==
Event	Gold		Silver		Bronze	
100 m	Ieva Zunda	11.96	Elīna Taluce	12.19	Liene Puriņa	12.28
200 m	Elīna Taluce	24.92	Ieva Ješkina	25.74	Silva Silkalne	26.17
400 m	Sandra Krūma	56.42	Ieva Ješkina	57.12	Kristīne Trūpa	58.48
800 m	Poļina Jeļizarova	2:12.32	Terēze Vimba	2:16.91	Aļona Meļņika	2:17.34
1 500 m	Poļina Jeļizarova	4:18.65	Linda Batņa	4:37.32	Aļona Meļņika	4:39.48
3 000 m	Agnese Pastare	10:16.30	Svetlana Illarionova	10:28.39	Alevtina Popova	13:10.82
5 000 m	Agnese Pastare	17:27.25	Irīna Štūla-Pankoka	18:20.59	Gunita Ošeniece	20:10.70
4 x 100 m	Zanda Grava; Sandra Krūma; Ieva Zunda; Liene Puriņa	47.01	Santa Matule; Olga Nedviga; Jūlija Gapaka; Elīna Taluce	48.61	Silva Silkalne; Anastasija Preobraženska; Māra Karakone; Kristīne Trūpa	49.43
4 x 400 m	Linda Cepurīte; Lāsma Grīnberga; Aļona Meļņika; Ieva Juškeviča	4:01.08	Diāna Lismane; Paula Rozenvalde; Zanda Marta Grava; Terēze Vimba	4:06.96	Aleksandra Veļgana; Liene Skuja; Sabīne Grigorjeva; Sandra Krūma	4:10.25
100 m hurdles	Aiga Grabuste	13.62	Zanda Marta Grava	14.98	Ieva Juškeviča	14.81
400 m hurdles	Sandra Krūma	1:00.85	Līga Velvere	1:03.66	Linda Cepurīte	1:04.61
3 000 m steeplechase	Lāsma Grīnberga	10:36.29	Irīna Štūla-Pankoka	11:14.36	Inga Valdmane	12:28.02
Triple Jump	Olga Savenkova	13.91	Natālija Čakova	12.65	Madara Apine	12.57
Long Jump	Olga Savenkova	5.93	Lauma Grīva	5.81	Ilva Janīte	5.80
High Jump	Natālija Čakova	1.81	Aiga Grabuste	1.74	Laura Ludevika	1.71
Pole Vault	Elīna Ringa	3.50	Ilze Bortašķenoka	3.40	Maira Blūma	3.00
Shot Put	Inga Miķelsone	12.47	Dace Šteinerte	12.35	Lāsma Beķere	12.13
Hammer Throw	Laura Igaune	57.05	Sanita Karluša	40.58	Ilze Jegorova	33.44
Discus Throw	Laura Igaune	47.51	Dace Šteinerte	43.52	Inga Miķelsone	39.27
Javelin Throw	Sinta Ozoliņa	56.38	Madara Palameika	53.45	Kristīne Buša	48.38
