= Luke Demetre =

Canadian bobsledder

Personal information
- Born: 22 March 1990 (age 35) New Glasgow, Nova Scotia, Canada

Sport
- Country: Canada
- Sport: Bobsleigh

Luke Demetre (born 22 March 1990) is a Canadian bobsledder from New Glasgow, Nova Scotia. Originally a Track and field athlete, he was a sprinter for Dalhousie University, twice named Atlantic University Sport All-Star. It was during his time at Dalhousie that he was recruited to try bobsleigh. He competed at the 2014 Winter Olympics in Sochi, in four-man bobsleigh after initially attending as an alternate.
