= Graeme Rinholm =

Canadian bobsledder

Personal information
- Nationality: Canadian
- Born: 18 October 1985 (age 39)

Sport
- Sport: Bobsleigh

Graeme Rinholm (born 18 October 1985) is a Canadian bobsledder and biochemist. He competed at the FIBT World Championships 2011 in Königssee, and at the 2014 Winter Olympics in Sochi, in four-man bobsleigh.
