= Mihails Arhipovs =

Latvian bobsledder (born 1984)

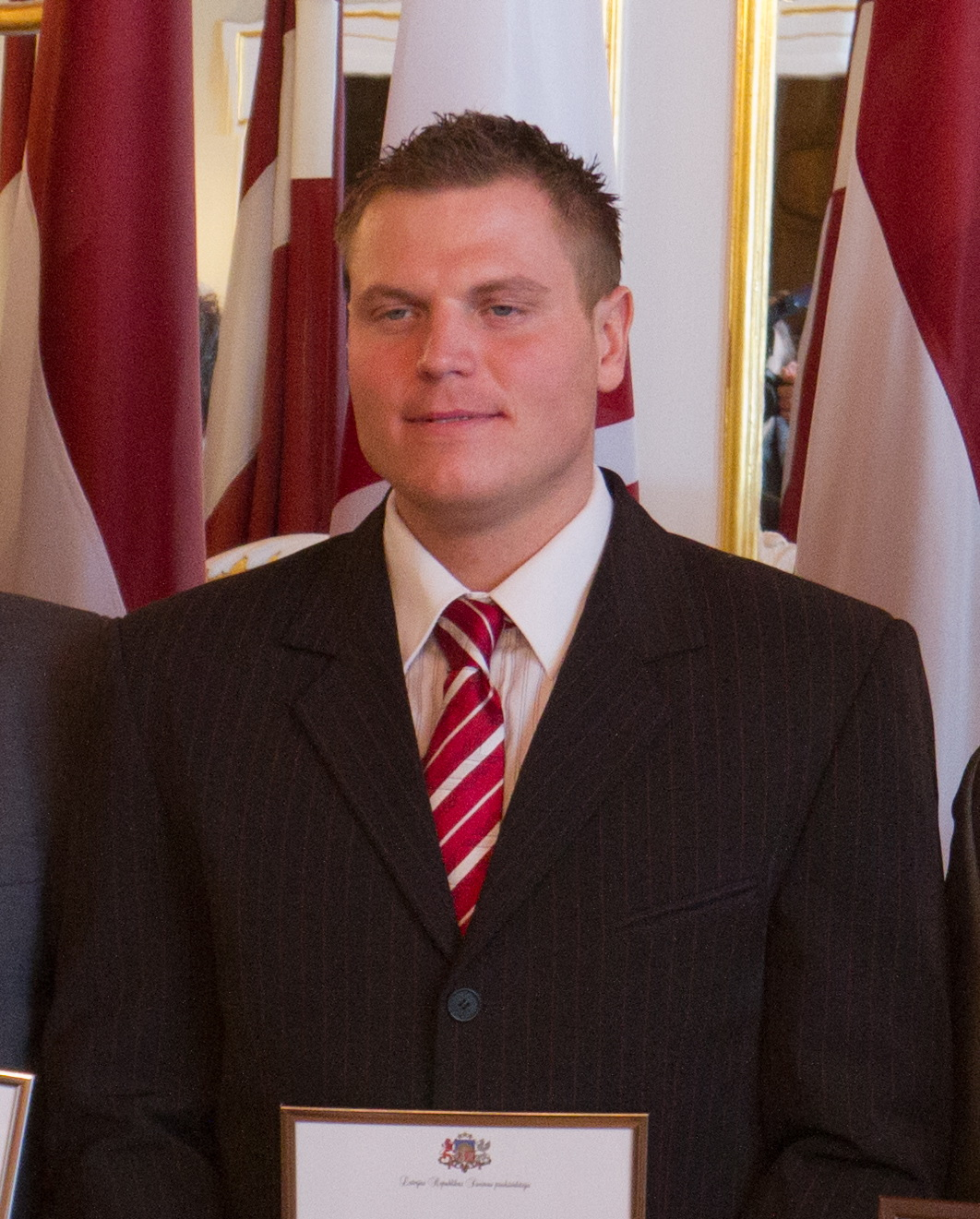
- Arhipovs in March 2013

Personal information
- Born: 10 November 1984 (age 41) Sigulda, Latvia

Sport
- Country: Latvia
- Sport: Bobsled

Mihails Arhipovs (born 10 November 1984 in Sigulda) is a former Latvian bobsledder who has competed since 2003. Competing in two Winter Olympics, he earned his best finish of tenth in the four-man event at Vancouver in 2010.

Currently he is a coach of the Latvian skeleton team.

In the 2005–06 season, Arhipovs had a 15th-place from Lake Placid, New York, as his best result. He took over from Gatis Gūts as the second Latvian four-man bobsleigh representative in bobsleigh World Cup events. He had a fifth and eighth placing from the 2005 Junior World Championships.

At the 2007 FIBT World Championships in St. Moritz, Arhipovs finished 20th in the two-man event and 18th in the four-man event.

He retired early due to an injury.
