= Fabio Badraun =

Swiss bobsledder (born 1987)

Personal information
- Nationality: Swiss
- Born: 4 October 1987 (age 37)

Sport
- Sport: Bobsleigh

Fabio Badraun (born 4 October 1987) is a Swiss bobsledder. He competed at the 2018 and 2022 Winter Olympics.
