= Francesco Costa (bobsledder) =

Italian bobsledder

Personal information
- Born: 28 May 1985 (age 41)

Sport
- Country: Italy
- Sport: Bobsleigh

Francesco Costa (born May 28, 1985) is a bobsledder from Italy. He competed for Italy at the 2014 Winter Olympics in the four-man bobsleigh event.

Francesco Costa is an athlete of the Gruppo Sportivo Fiamme Oro.
