= Heath Spence =

Australian bobsledder

Personal information
- Nationality: Australian
- Born: 15 April 1980 (age 44); Melbourne

Sport
- Sport: Bobsleigh

Heath Spence (born 15 April 1980) is an Australian bobsledder. He was born in Melbourne. He competed at the 2014 Winter Olympics in Sochi, in two-man and four-man bobsleigh.
