= Daumants Dreiškens =

Latvian bobsledder (born 1984)

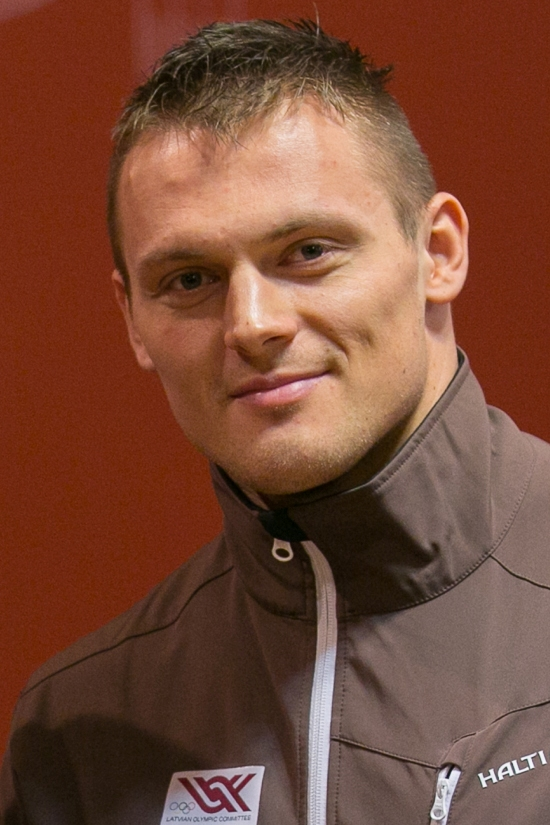
- Dreiškens at the 2014 Winter Olympics

Personal information
- Born: 28 March 1984 (age 42) Gulbene, Latvian SSR
Medal record
Olympic Games
| Gold medal – first place | 2014 Sochi | Four-man |
| Bronze medal – third place | 2014 Sochi | Two-man |
World Championships
| Gold medal – first place | 2016 Igls | Four-man |
| Silver medal – second place | 2015 Winterberg | Two-man |
| Bronze medal – third place | 2009 Lake Placid | Four-man |
| Bronze medal – third place | 2015 Winterberg | Four-man |

Daumants Dreiškens (born 28 March 1984) is a Latvian bobsledder, brakeman, who has competed since 2003.

He won a gold medal in the four-man event at the FIBT World Championships 2016 in Igls, Austria, with pilot Oskars Melbārdis, Arvis Vilkaste and Jānis Strenga. It was the first ever World Championships gold medal in bobsled for Latvia.

He also won a silver medal in the two-man event at FIBT World Championships 2015 in Winterberg, Germany, and two bronze medals in the four-man events at the FIBT World Championships 2009 in Lake Placid, New York, with pilot Jānis Miņins, Oskars Melbārdis and Intars Dambis, and at the FIBT World Championships 2015.

Dreiškens also competed in three Winter Olympics, earning a silver medal in the four-man event at Sochi in 2014. He finished 5th in the two-man event at Sochi in 2014 and 6th in the two-man event at Turin in 2006 .

He became the four-man European Champion in 2008 and 2015 and finished 3rd in the four-man event in 2016 Bobsleigh European Championship. He also finished 2nd in the two-man event in 2015 Bobsleigh European Championship.

At the 2014–15 Bobsleigh World Cup season Dreiškens as Oskars Melbārdis brakeman has 15 (from 16) podium finishes in two-man and four-man events, including seven first places. In his career, he has more than 40 podium finishes at Bobsleigh World Cup.

Dreiškens started his career mostly competing with pilot Jānis Miņins. After Miņins retirement he competed with pilot Edgars Maskalāns and later with Oskars Melbārdis.

Prior to his bobsleigh career, Dreiškens was a basketball player for BK Gulbenes Buki in Latvian Basketball League.

Olympic Games
| Preceded by Sandis Ozoliņš | Flagbearer for Latvia; 2018 Pyeongchang | Succeeded by Incumbent |
