= FIBT World Championships 2015 =

Bobsleigh and skeleton world championships

2015 World Championships
- Location: Winterberg, Germany
- Dates: February 23 – March 8

The FIBT World Championships 2015 took place at the Winterberg bobsleigh, luge, and skeleton track in Winterberg, Germany, for the fourth time from 23 February to 8 March 2015.

Winterberg was selected on 16 July 2011 during congress of the FIBT in Pyeongchang.

== Schedule ==
Six events were held over a period of 2 weeks.

Date	Time	Events
26 February	14:45	Two-women run 1 and 2
27 February	13:05	Two-men run 1 and 2
28 February	13:30	Two-women run 3 and 4
1 March	10:30	Two-men run 3 and 4
1 March	15:00	Mixed team
5 March	10:00	Men run 1 and 2
6 March	11:00	Women run 1 and 2
6 March	14:30	Men run 3 and 4
7 March	10:00	Women run 3 and 4
7 March	13:15	Four-men run 1 and 2
8 March	15:00	Four-men run 3 and 4

== Medal summary ==
=== Medal table ===
Rank	Nation	Gold	Silver	Bronze	Total
1	Germany (GER)	3	5	1	9
2	Latvia (LAT)	1	1	2	4
3	Great Britain (GBR)	1	0	0	1
3	United States (USA)	1	0	0	1
5	Russia (RUS)	0	1	0	1
6	Canada (CAN)	0	0	2	2
Totals (6 entries)		6	7	5	18

=== Bobsleigh ===
Event	Gold		Silver		Bronze	
Two-man	Germany; Francesco Friedrich; Thorsten Margis	3:43.30	Latvia; Oskars Melbārdis; Daumants Dreiškens; Germany; Johannes Lochner; Joshua Bluhm	3:44.36	not awarded	
Four-man	Germany; Maximilian Arndt; Alexander Rödiger; Kevin Korona; Ben Heber	3:34.89	Germany; Nico Walther; Andreas Bredau; Marko Hübenbecker; Christian Poser	3:34.91	Latvia; Oskars Melbārdis; Daumants Dreiškens; Arvis Vilkaste; Jānis Strenga	3:35.01
Two-woman	United States; Elana Meyers; Cherrelle Garrett	3:46.47	Germany; Anja Schneiderheinze-Stöckel; Annika Drazek	3:46.90	Germany; Cathleen Martini; Stephanie Schneider	3:47.53

=== Skeleton ===
Event	Gold		Silver		Bronze	
Men	Martins Dukurs; Latvia	3:43.23	Aleksandr Tretyakov; Russia	3:43.92	Tomass Dukurs; Latvia	3:44.75
Women	Lizzy Yarnold; Great Britain	3:49.95	Jacqueline Lölling; Germany	3:50.62	Elisabeth Vathje; Canada	3:50.74

=== Mixed ===
Event	Gold		Silver		Bronze	
Mixed team	Germany; Axel Jungk; Cathleen Martini; Lisette Thöne; Tina Hermann; Francesco Friedrich; Martin Grothkopp	3:48.83	Germany; Christopher Grotheer; Anja Schneiderheinze-Stöckel; Franziska Bertels; Anja Selbach; Johannes Lochner; Gregor Bermbach	3:49.27	Canada; Dave Greszczyszyn; Kaillie Humphries; Kate O'Brien; Elisabeth Vathje; Justin Kripps; Alexander Kopacz	3:50.01
