= Marco Rangl =

Austrian bobsledder

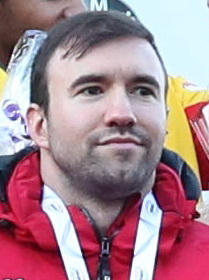
- Rangl in 2020

Personal information
- Born: 7 May 1990 (age 35) Eisenstadt, Austria
- Height: 1.83 m (6 ft 0 in)
- Weight: 105 kg (231 lb)

Sport
- Country: Austria
- Sport: Bobsleigh

Marco Rangl (born 7 May 1990) is an Austrian bobsledder. He competed in the four-man event at the 2018 Winter Olympics.
