= Intars Dambis =

Latvian bobsledder (born 1983)

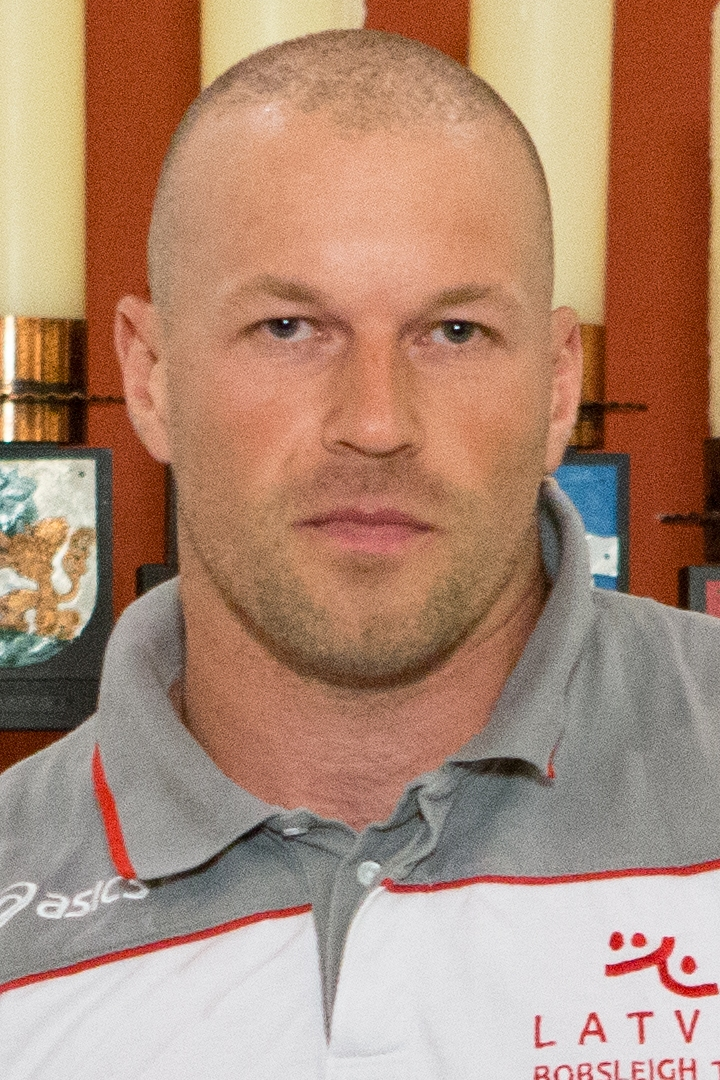

Personal information
- Born: 3 September 1983 (age 43) Gulbene, Latvian SSR
Medal record
Bobsleigh
Representing Latvia
World Championships
Bronze medal – third place	2009 Lake Placid	Four-man

Intars Dambis (born 3 September 1983) is a Latvian bobsledder who has competed since 2002. He won a bronze medal in the four-man event at the FIBT World Championships 2009 in Lake Placid, New York.

== Career highlights ==
World Championships
2005 - Calgary, 24th at 4-bob with Gūts / Dīcmanis / Rozītis
2007 - St. Moritz, 20th at 2-bob with Mihails Arhipovs
2007 - St. Moritz, 18th at 4-bob with Arhipovs / Dīcmanis / Melbārdis
World Cup
2007 - Calgary, 5th at 4-bob with Miņins / Dreiškens / Melbārdis
2007 - Park City, 4th at 4-bob with Miņins / Dreiškens / Melbārdis
2007 - Lake Placid, 9th at 4-bob with Miņins / Dreiškens / Melbārdis
2008 - Cortina d'Ampezzo, 7th at 4-bob with Miņins / Dreiškens / Melbārdis
2008 - Cesana, 1st (gold) at 4-bob with Miņins / Dreiškens / Melbārdis
European Championships
2008 - Cesana, 1st (gold) at 4-bob with Miņins / Dreiškens / Melbārdis
