= Vairis Leiboms =

Latvian bobsledder

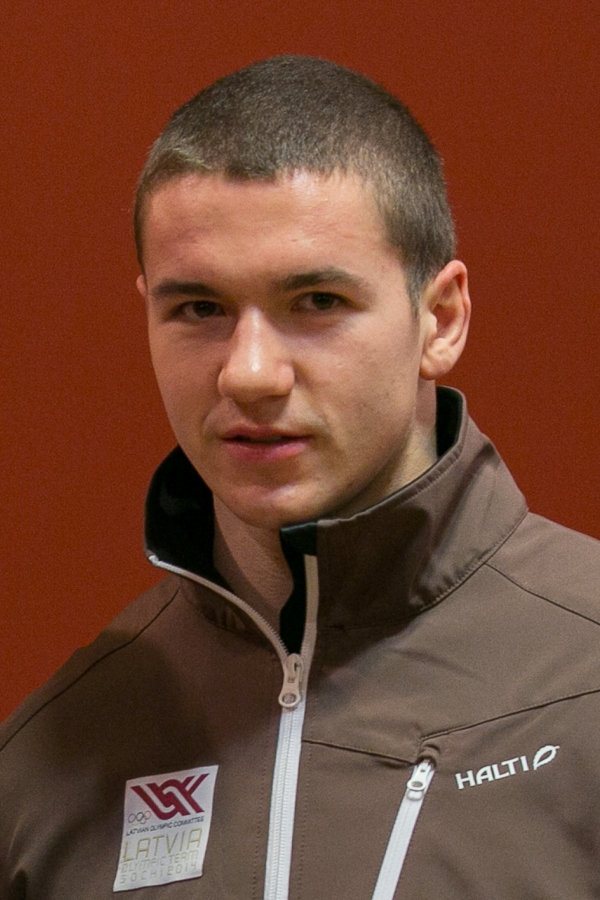
- Vairis Leiboms in 2014

Personal information
- Nationality: Latvian
- Born: 18 August 1991 (age 33); Ergli

Sport
- Sport: Bobsleigh

Vairis Leiboms (born 18 August 1991) is a Latvian bobsledder. He was born in Ergli. He competed at the 2014 Winter Olympics in Sochi, in two-man and four-man bobsleigh.
