= Jānis Strenga =

Latvian bobsledder (born 1986)

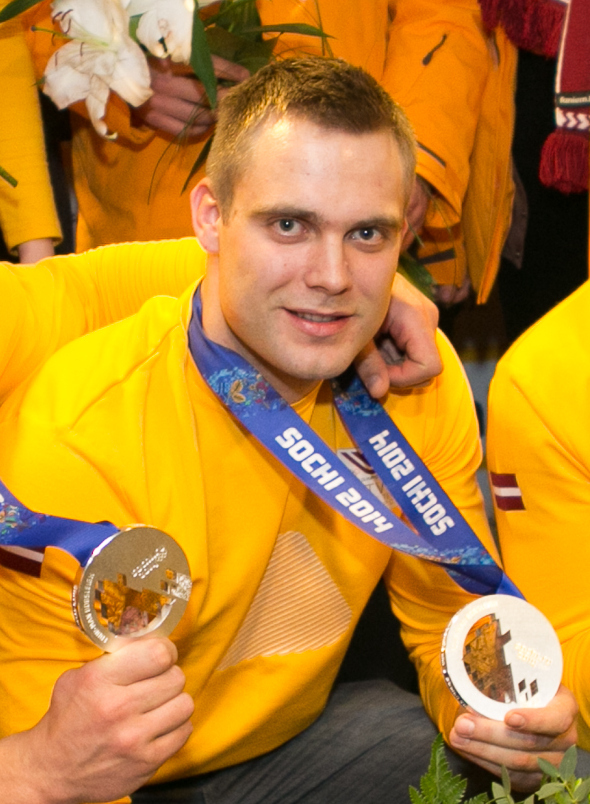
- Strenga in 2014 on his return from the 2014 Winter Olympics

Personal information
- Nationality: Latvian
- Born: 16 February 1988 (age 38) Sigulda, Latvian SSR, Soviet Union (now Sigulda, Latvia)
- Height: 1.83 m (6 ft 0 in)
- Weight: 84 kg (185 lb)

Sport
- Country: Latvia
- Sport: Bobsleigh
- Event: Four-man
- Turned pro: 2008
Medal record
Olympic Games
Gold medal – first place	2014 Sochi	Four-man
Bronze medal – third place	2018 Pyeongchang	Two-man
World Championships
Gold medal – first place	2016 Igls	Four-man
Silver medal – second place	2019 Whistler	Four-man
Bronze medal – third place	2015 Winterberg	Four-man
European Championship
Gold medal – first place	2015 La Plagne	Four-man
Silver medal – second place	2019 Königssee	Four-man
Bronze medal – third place	2016 St. Moritz	Four-man
Bronze medal – third place	2018 Igls	Four-man

Janis Strenga (born 5 February 1986) is a former Latvian bobsledder, brakeman who has competed since 2008.

== Career ==
He won a gold medal in the four-man event at the FIBT World Championships 2016 in Igls, Austria (with pilot Oskars Melbārdis, Daumants Dreiškens and Arvis Vilkaste). It was the first ever World Championships gold medal in bobsled for Latvia.

He also won a bronze medal in the four-man event at FIBT World Championships 2015 in Winterberg, Germany as well as 2012 World Junior Championship title at both two-man and four-man events.

Strenga competed in 2014 Winter Olympics at Sochi and won a gold medal in the four-man event. He became the four-man European Champion in 2015 and finished 3rd in the four-man event in 2016 Bobsleigh European Championship. At the 2014–15 Bobsleigh World Cup season Strenga as Oscars Melisande brakeman has 8 from 8 podium finishes in four-man events, including five first places.
