= Arvis Vilkaste =

Latvian bobsledder (born 1989)

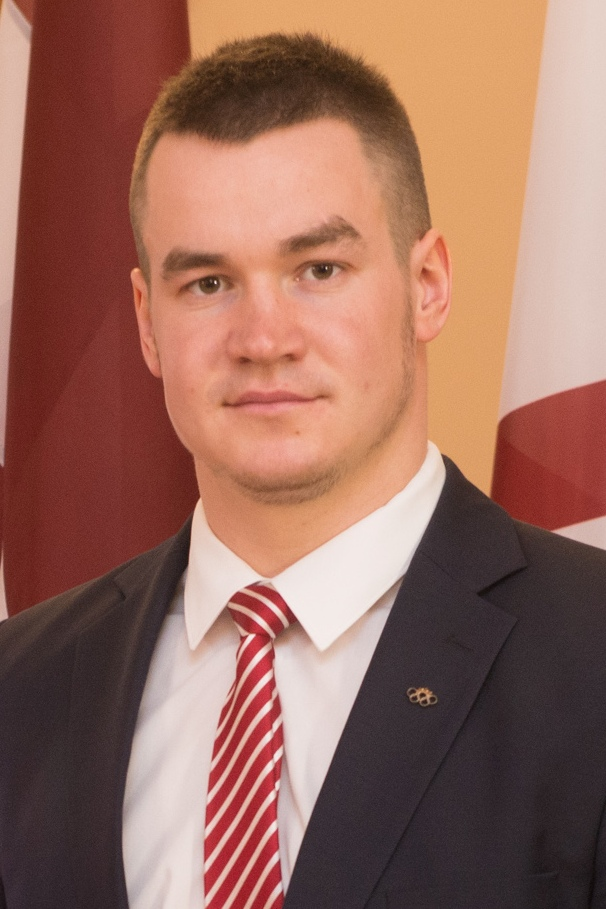

Personal information
- Nationality: Latvian
- Born: 8 April 1989 (age 37) Balvi, Latvia
- Height: 1.83 m (6 ft 0 in)
- Weight: 97 kg (214 lb)

Sport
- Country: Latvia
- Sport: Bobsleigh
- Event: Four-man
- Turned pro: 2010
Medal record
Men's bobsleigh
Representing Latvia
Olympic Games
Gold medal – first place	2014 Sochi	Four-man
World Championships
Gold medal – first place	2016 Igls	Four-man
Silver medal – second place	2019 Whistler	Four-man
Bronze medal – third place	2015 Winterberg	Four-man
European Championship
Gold medal – first place	2015 La Plagne	Four-man
Silver medal – second place	2019 Königssee	Four-man
Bronze medal – third place	2016 St. Moritz	Four-man

Arvis Vilkaste (born 8 April 1989) is a Latvian bobsledder, brakeman who has competed since 2010.

He won a gold medal in the four-man event at the FIBT World Championships 2016 in Igls, Austria (with pilot Oskars Melbārdis, Daumants Dreiškens and Jānis Strenga). It was the first ever World Championships gold medal in bobsled for Latvia.

He also won a bronze medal in the four-man event at FIBT World Championships 2015 in Winterberg, Germany as well as 2012 World Junior Championship title in the four-man event.

Vilkaste competed in 2014 Winter Olympics at Sochi and won a silver medal in the four-man event.

He became the four-man European Champion in 2015 and finished 3rd in the four-man event in 2016 Bobsleigh European Championship.

At the 2014–15 Bobsleigh World Cup season Vilkaste as Oskars Melbārdis brakeman has 8 from 8 podium finishes in four-man events, including five first places.

Before becoming a bobsledder, Vilkaste was a sprinter, winning a gold medal at the 4x100 relay at the 2008 Latvian Athletics Championships.
