= Cherrelle Garrett =

American bobsledder

Personal information
- Born: May 7, 1989 (age 37) San Francisco, USA

Sport
- Country: United States
- Sport: Bobsleigh
Medal record
World Championships
Gold medal – first place	2015 Winterberg	Two-woman

Cherrelle Garrett (born May 7, 1989) is an American bobsledder. At the FIBT World Championships 2015 Garrett, together with pilot Elana Meyers beat three German crews to win the first world championship title in women's bobsled for the United States.

Garrett was also an All-American sprinter for the California Golden Bears track and field team, anchoring their 4 × 100 meters relay squad at the 2008 NCAA Division I Outdoor Track and Field Championships.
