= James McNaughton (bobsleigh) =

Canadian bobsledder (born 1987)

James McNaughton (born December 11, 1987, in Newmarket, Ontario) is a Canadian Olympic bobsledder.
