= Gregor Bermbach =

German bobsledder (born 1981)

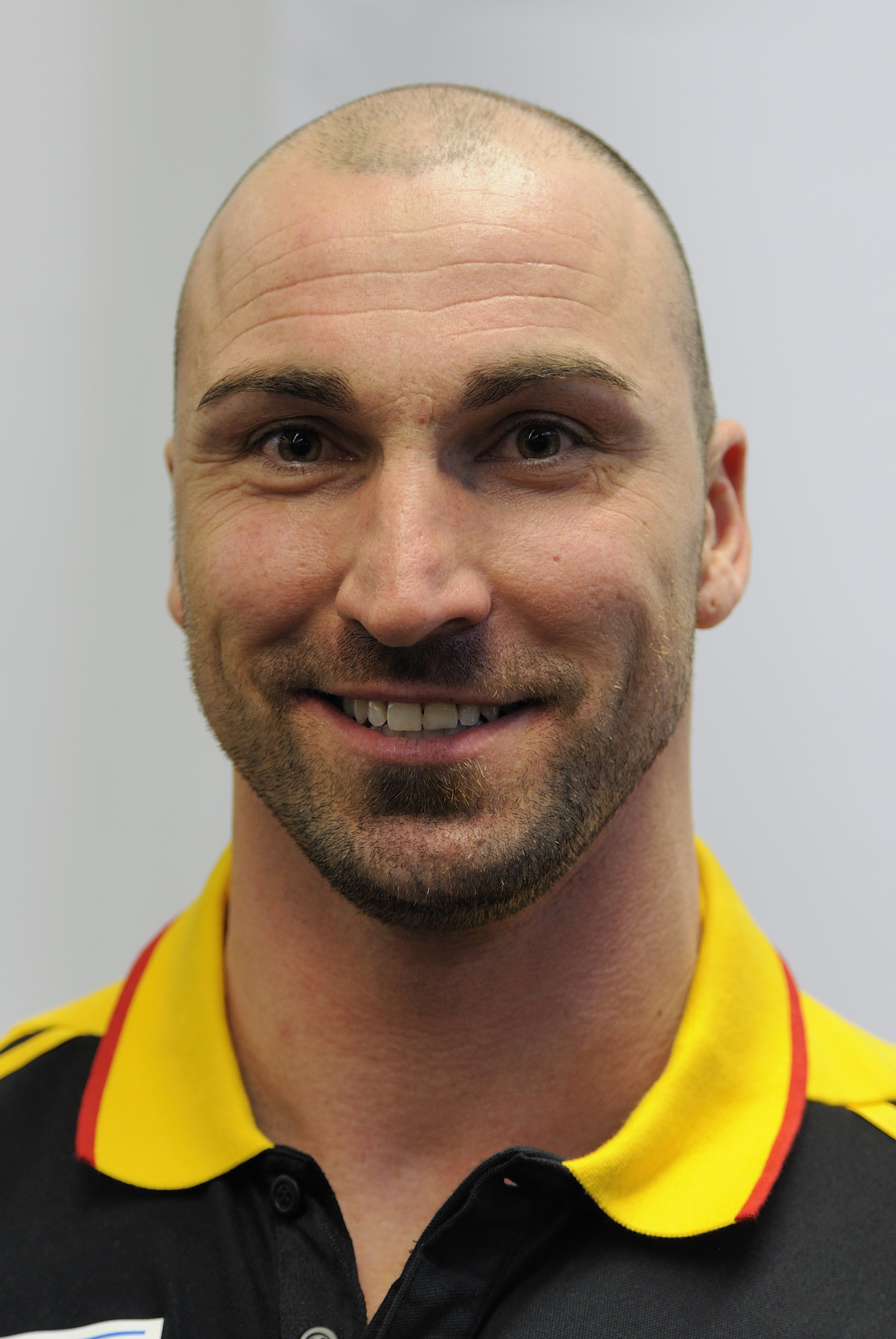

Personal information
- Born: 17 February 1981 (age 45)

Sport
- Country: Germany
- Sport: Bobsled
Medal record
World Championships
Silver medal – second place	2011 Königssee	Four-man
Silver medal – second place	2015 Winterberg	Mixed team
Silver medal – second place	2016 Igls	Four-man

Gregor Bermbach (born 17 February 1981) is a German bobsledder who has competed since 2006. He has two World Cup victories in the four-man events during the 2008–09 season.

At the FIBT World Championships 2009 in Lake Placid, New York, Bermbach finished ninth in the two-man event while crashing out in the first run of the four-man event.

Bermach finished seventh in the four-man event and ninth in the two-man event at the 2010 Winter Olympics in Vancouver.
