= Bryan Barnett =

Canadian sprinter (born 1987)

Personal information
- Nationality: Canadian
- Born: 10 February 1987 (age 39) Edmonton, Alberta
- Height: 183 cm (6 ft 0 in)
- Weight: 102 kg (225 lb)

Sport
- Sport: Running and Bobsleigh
- Club: Capital City Track Club

Achievements and titles
- Personal best(s): 100m: 10.22s (Padova 2009) 200m: 20.31s (Osaka 2007) 400m: 46.17s (Edmonton 2006)
Medal record
Men's Athletics
Representing Canada
Pan American Games
Silver medal – second place	2007 Rio de Janeiro	4×100 m relay
World Junior Championships
Silver medal – second place	2006 Beijing	200 m
Pan American Junior Championships
Bronze medal – third place	2005 Windsor	4×400 m relay

Bryan Barnett (born 10 February 1987) is a Canadian sprinter who specializes in the 200 metres. He took up bobsleigh in 2013 and represented Canada at the 2014 Sochi Olympics.

== Career ==
=== Athletics ===
Barnett won the silver medal in the 200m event at the 2006 World Junior Championships, and also competed at the 2007, 2009, and 2011 World Championships in Athletics, as well as the 2008 Olympic Games without reaching the final. For his silver medal performance at the 2006 World Junior Championships, he was named the 2006 Outstanding Junior Athlete of the Year by Athletics Canada. At the 2007 Pan American Games he won a silver medal in the 4 x 100 metres relay, together with teammates Richard Adu-Bobie, Anson Henry and Jared Connaughton.

Bryan currently trains in Edmonton with the Q-School training group under coach Quin Sekulich, coach of a number of high performance athletes.

=== Bobsled ===
Barnett took up bobsled in 2013 after thinking that his sprinting abilities would make him a good fit for the sport. He is one of the few athletes who have competed in both the Summer and Winter Olympic games, after competing at the 2014 Winter Olympics in the two-man and four-man bobsled events, finishing 6th in the two-man with teammate Justin Kripps, and 13th in the four-man with teammates Christopher Spring, James McNaughton, and Timothy Randall.

== Statistics ==
=== Personal bests ===
Event	Best	Location	Date
50 meters	5.83s	Saskatoon, SK Canada	8 February 2008
55 meters	6.23s	Flagstaff, AZ USA	19 February 2010
60 metres	6.66s	Saskatoon, SK Canada	8 July 2009
100 metres	10.22s	Padua, Italy	30 August 2009
200 metres	20.31s	Osaka, Japan	28 August 2007
400 meters	46.17s	Edmonton, AB Canada	8 July 2006
