= Alexander Rödiger =

German bobsledder (born 1985)

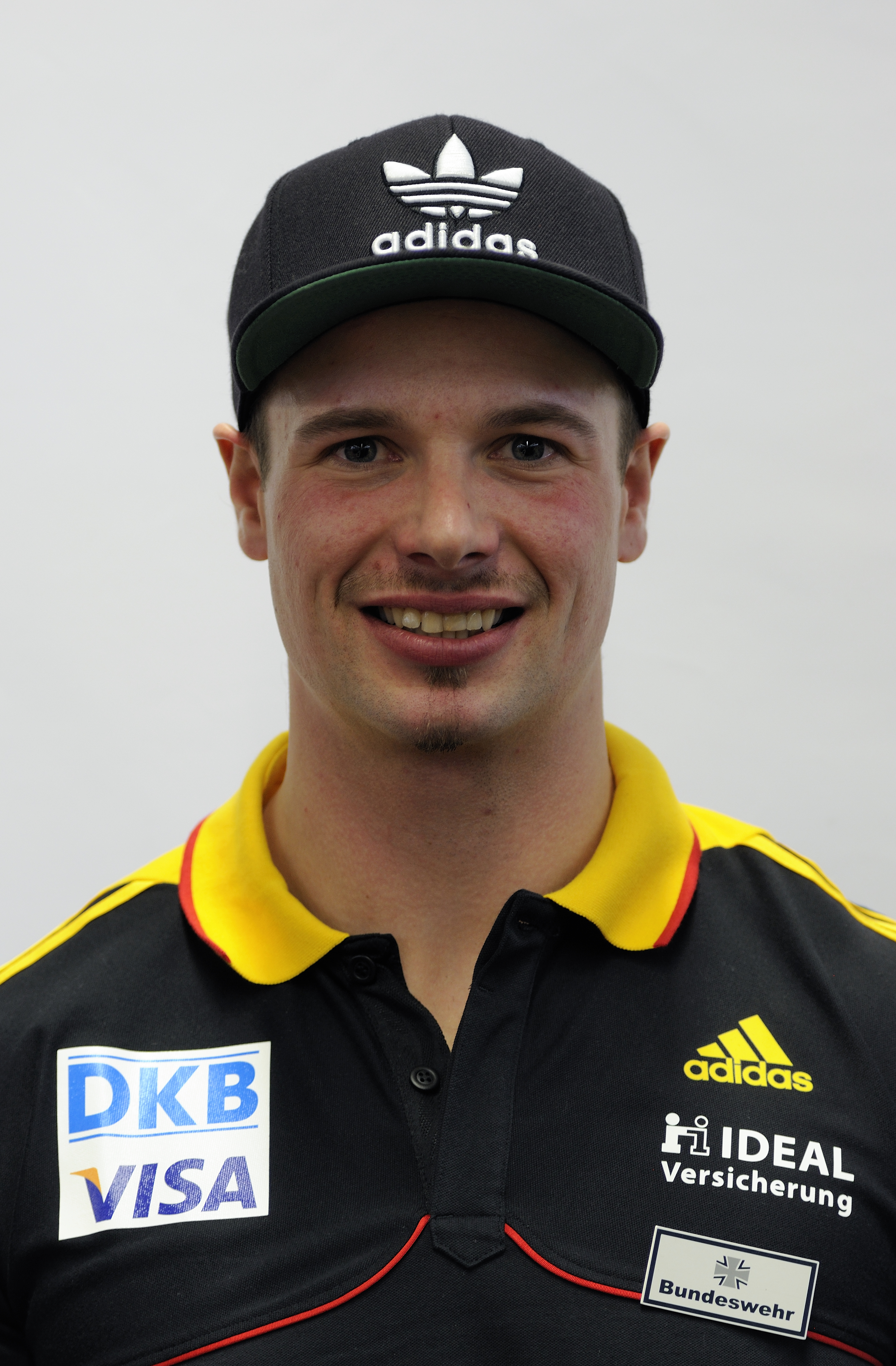

Personal information
- Nationality: German
- Born: 14 May 1985 (age 41) Eisenach, East Germany
- Height: 1.83 m (6 ft 0 in)
- Weight: 95 kg (209 lb)

Sport
- Country: Germany
- Sport: Bobsleigh
- Event: 4-man
- Club: BSR "Rennsteig" Oberhof

Achievements and titles
- Personal best: 2nd place, silver medalist(s)
Medal record
Men's bobsleigh
Representing Germany
Olympic Games
Silver medal – second place	2010 Vancouver	Four-man
Silver medal – second place	2018 Pyeongchang	Four-man
World Championships
Gold medal – first place	2013 St. Moritz	Four-man
Gold medal – first place	2015 Winterberg	Four-man
Silver medal – second place	2009 Lake Placid	Four-man
Silver medal – second place	2012 Lake Placid	Four-man
European Championships
Gold medal – first place	2007 Cortina d’Ampezzo	Four-man
Gold medal – first place	2012 Altenberg	Four-man
Gold medal – first place	2013 Igls	Four-man
Silver medal – second place	2022 St. Moritz	Four-man

Alexander Rödiger (born 14 May 1985) is a German bobsledder who has competed since 2006. He won a silver medal in the four-man event at the 2010 Winter Olympics in Vancouver.

Rödiger also won a silver medal in the four-man event at the FIBT World Championships 2009 in Lake Placid, New York.

Rödiger was part of the four-man crew that set start and track records at the 2008-09 Bobsleigh World Cup season opener in Winterberg, Germany.

His only other World Cup victory was at the track in Calgary in December 2006 and that was also in the four-man event.

Rödiger also finished second in the four-man event at the Junior FIBT World Championships in 2008.
