= Nikita Zakharov =

Russian bobsledder (born 1987)

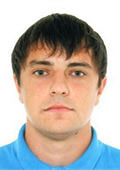

Personal information
- Nationality: Russian
- Born: 14 June 1987 (age 38) Dmitrov, Russian SSR, Soviet Union
- Height: 1.86 m (6 ft 1 in)
- Weight: 86 kg (190 lb)

Sport
- Country: Russia
- Sport: Bobsleigh (driver)

Nikita Zakharov (born 14 June 1987 in Dmitrov) is a Russian bobsledder.

Zakharov competed at the 2014 Winter Olympics for Russia. He teamed with Nikolay Khrenkov, Petr Moiseev and Maxim Mokrousov in the Russia-3 sled in the four-man event, finishing 15th.

As of April 2014, his best showing at the World Championships is 11th, coming in the four-man event in 2012.

Zakharov made his World Cup debut in December 2012. As of April 2014, his best World Cup finish is 8th, in a four-man event at Winterberg in 2013-14.
