= Nico Walther =

German bobsledder (born 1990)

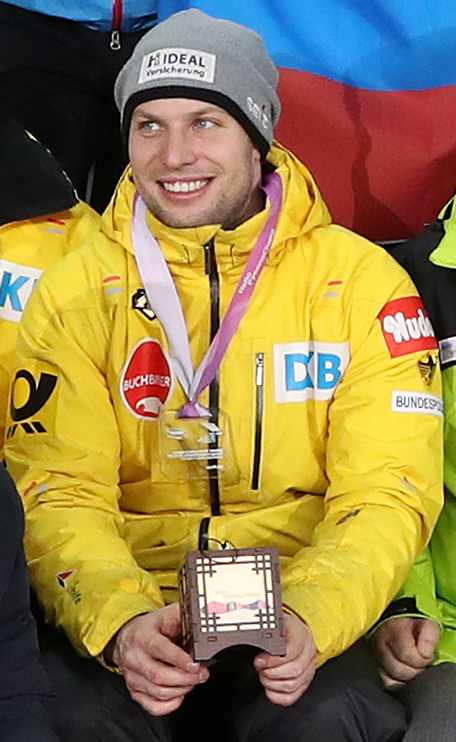
- Walther in 2017

Personal information
- Nationality: German
- Born: 7 June 1990 (age 36) Freital, East Germany
- Height: 1.88 m (6 ft 2 in)
- Weight: 98 kg (216 lb)

Sport
- Country: Germany
- Sport: Bobsleigh
- Event(s): Two-man, Four-man
- Club: BSC Sachsen Oberbärenburg
- Turned pro: 2011
Medal record
Olympic Games
Silver medal – second place	2018 Pyeongchang	Four-man
World Championships
Silver medal – second place	2015 Winterberg	Four-man
Silver medal – second place	2017 Königssee	Mixed team
Bronze medal – third place	2016 Igls	Mixed team
Bronze medal – third place	2017 Königssee	Four-man
Bronze medal – third place	2019 Whistler	Two-man
Bronze medal – third place	2020 Altenberg	Four-man

Nico Walther (born 7 June 1990) is a German bobsledder. He competed in the four-man event at the 2018 Winter Olympics winning a silver medal.
