= Marko Hübenbecker =

German bobsledder (born 1986)

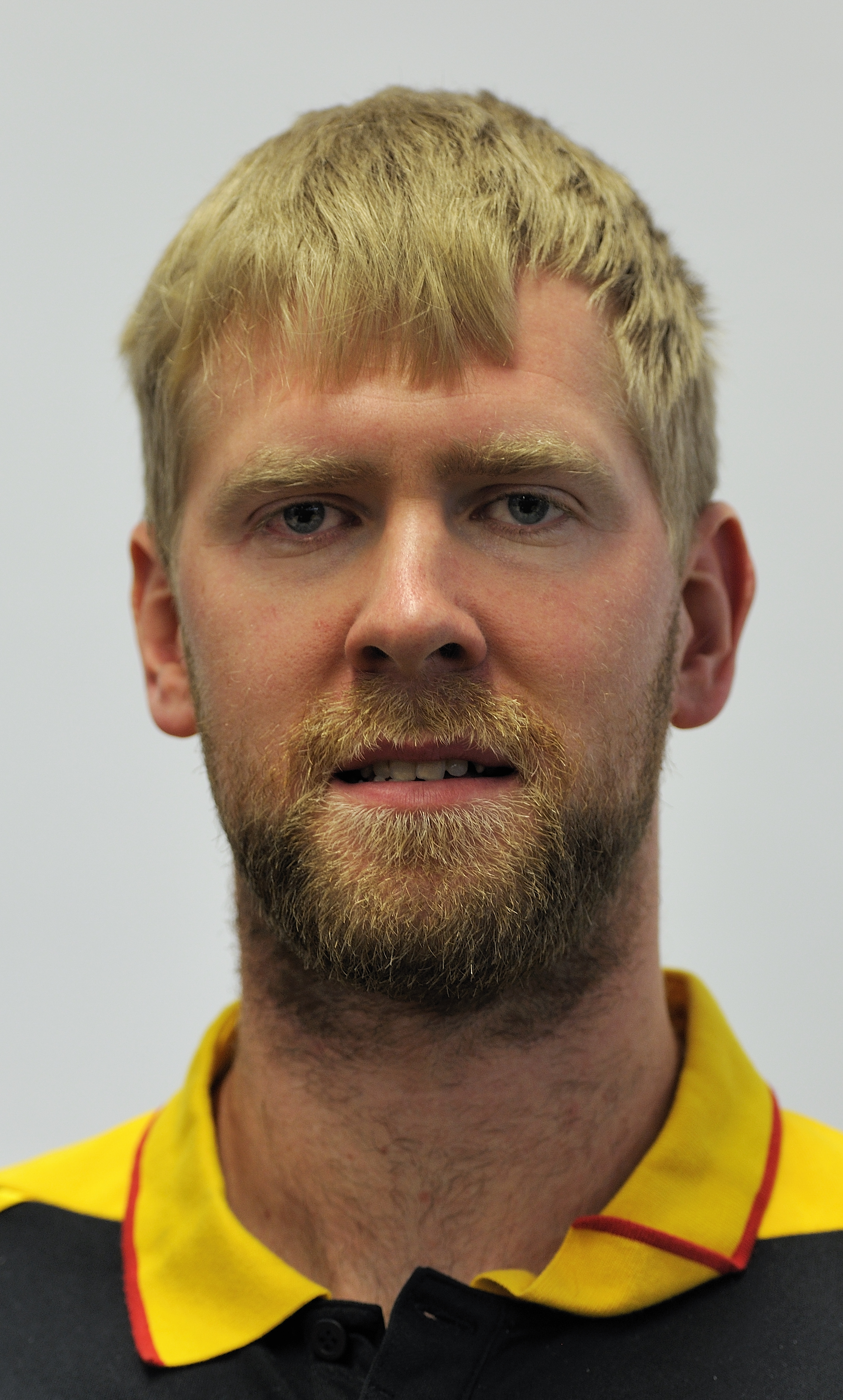
- Hübenbecker in 2014

Personal information
- Born: 14 June 1986 (age 40) Anklam
- Home town: Erfurt, Germany
- Height: 2.00 m (6 ft 7 in)
- Weight: 114 kg (251 lb)

Sport
- Country: Germany
- Sport: Bobsleigh
- Turned pro: 2008
Medal record
Men's bobsleigh
Representing Germany
World Championships
Gold medal – first place	2013 St. Moritz	Four-man
Silver medal – second place	2015 Winterberg	Four-man
Bronze medal – third place	2012 Lake Placid	Four-man

Marko Hübenbecker (also spelled Huebenbecker, born 14 June 1986) is a German bobsledder who has competed since 2008.
