= Codie Bascue =

American bobsledder

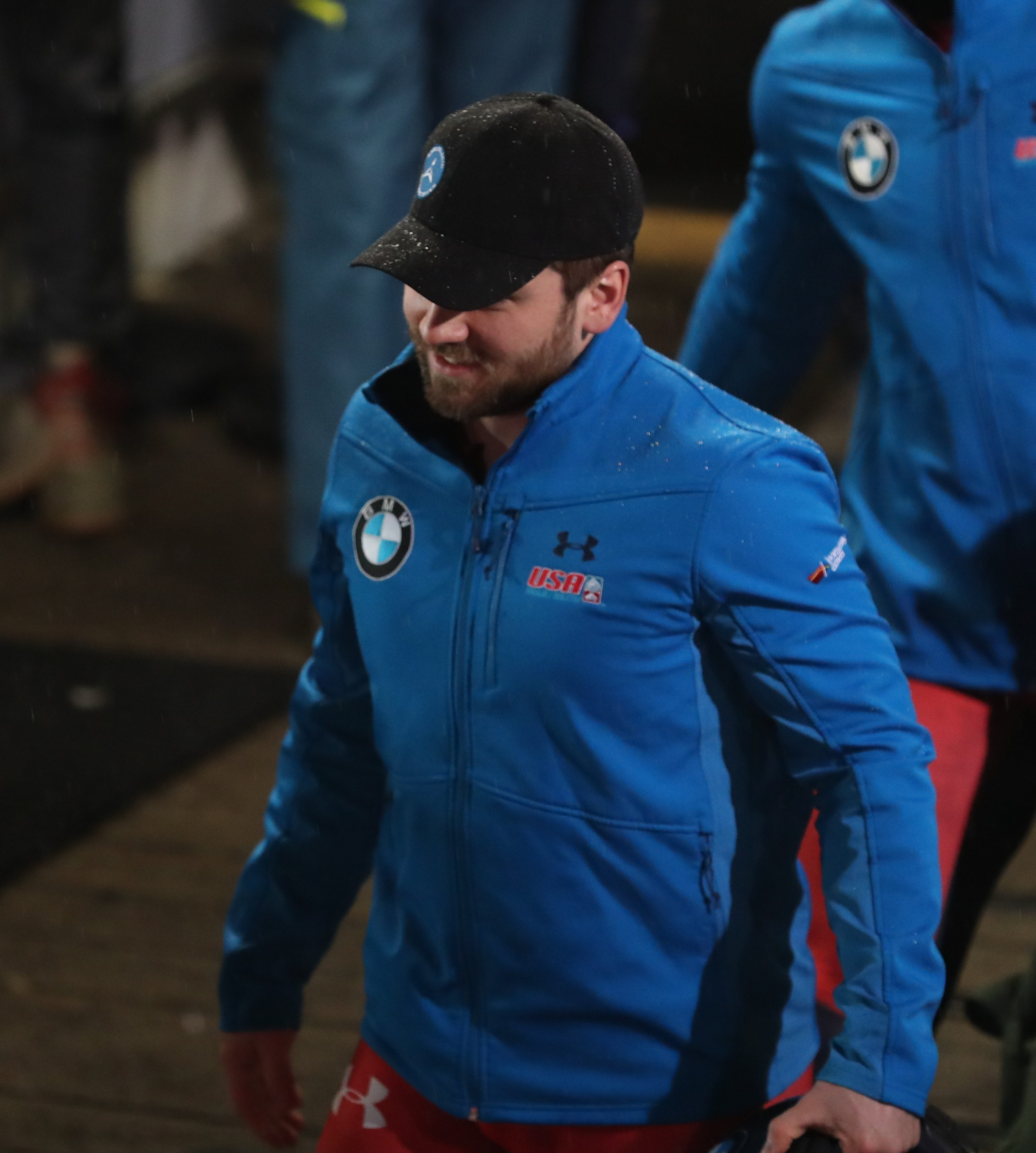
- Codie Bascue in 2019.

Personal information
- Born: July 13, 1994 (age 32) Whitehall, New York, U.S.
- Home town: Lake Placid, New York, U.S.
- Height: 5 ft 8 in (173 cm)

Sport
- Country: United States
- Sport: Bobsleigh

Codie Bascue (born July 13, 1994) is an American bobsledder. He is originally from Whitehall, New York. He competed in the two-man event and the four-man event at the 2018 Winter Olympics as a pilot.
