= Helvijs Lūsis =

Latvian bobsledder (born 1987)

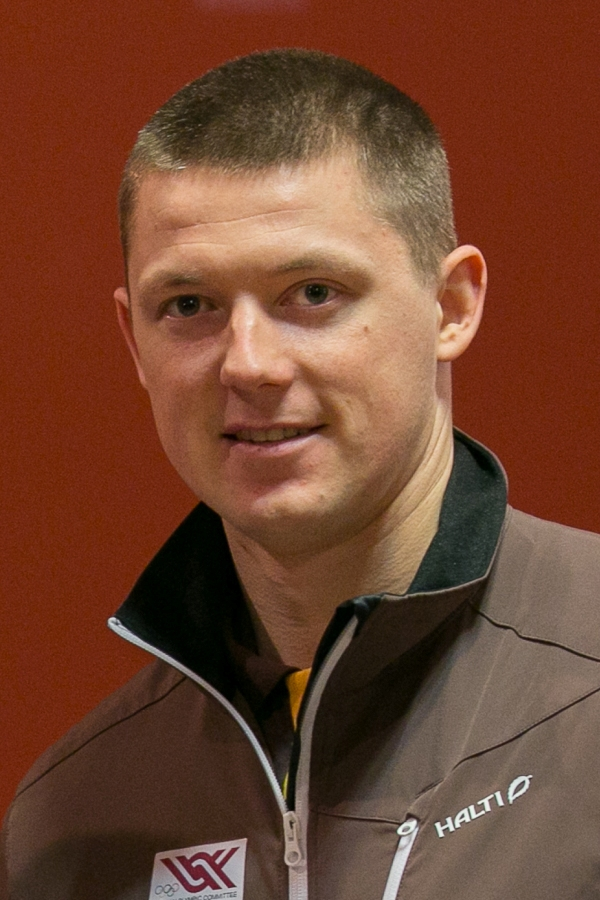
Helvijs Lūsis in 2014

Helvijs Lūsis (born 14 January 1987) is a Latvian bobsledder, brakeman who has competed since 2010.

So far his highest achievements include a bronze medal at the four-man 2011–12 Bobsleigh World Cup race in Winterberg as well as 2012 World Junior Championship title at the four-man event.

Before becoming a bobsledder, Lūsis was a sprinter, winning a bronze medal at the 4x100 relay at the 2008 Latvian Athletics Championships.
