= Aleksey Stulnev =

Russian bobsledder

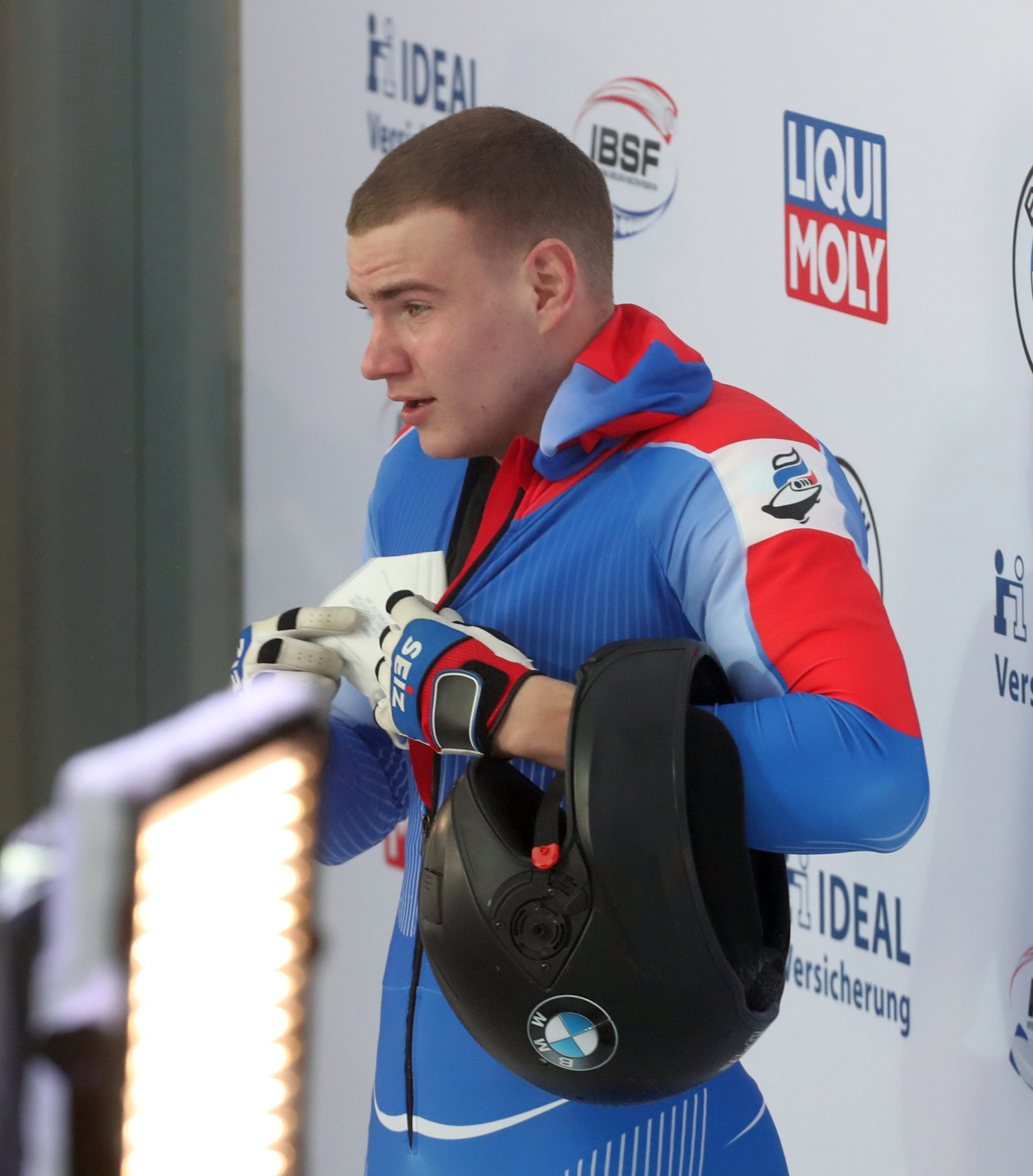
- Stulnev in 2021

Personal information
- Nationality: Russian
- Born: 12 December 1987 (age 37)

Sport
- Sport: Bobsleigh

Aleksey Stulnev (born 12 December 1987) is a Russian bobsledder. He competed in the two-man event at the 2018 Winter Olympics.
