= Jan Vrba (bobsledder) =

Czech bobsledder

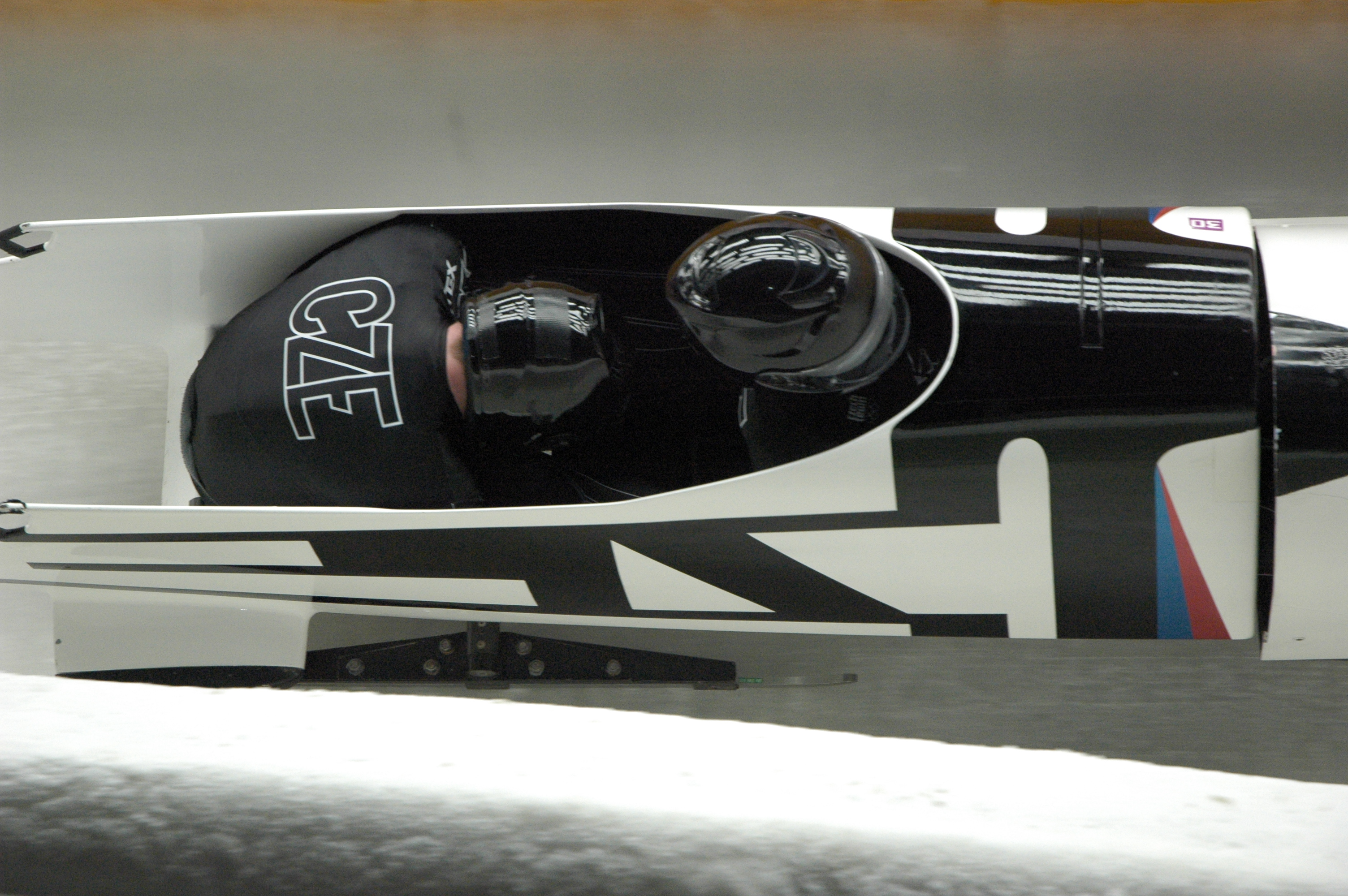
- Vrba at the 2014 Winter Olympics

Sport
- Country: Czech Republic
- Sport: Bobsleigh

Jan Vrba (born 28 January 1982 in Jablonec nad Nisou) is a Czech bobsledder who has competed since 2004. His best World Cup finish was 5th at Altenberg in the four-man event (2005: St. Moritz, 2009: Altenberg).

Vrba was selected to compete at the 2010 Winter Olympics in the four-man event where he finished 16th. He later competed at the 2014 and 2018 Winter Olympics.
