= FIBT World Championships 2011 =

Bobsleigh and skeleton competition

2011 World Championships
- Location: Konigssee, Germany
- Dates: February 14-27

The FIBT World Championships 2011 took place 14 February – 27 February 2011 in Königssee, Germany, for the fifth time, doing so previously in 1979, 1986, and 1990 (skeleton), and 2004. In 2007, the championships were awarded to Cortina d'Ampezzo, Italy over Winterberg Germany, but Cortina withdrew in February 2009 to a series of issues.

== Original selection ==
Cortina d'Ampezzo, Italy, was selected 21–13 over Winterberg, Germany, at the FIBT annual conference in London, England, on 2 June 2007.

It was to have been Cortina's tenth time hosting the event, having done so previously in 1937 (two-man), 1939 (four-man), 1950, 1954, 1960, 1966, 1981, 1989 (bobsleigh), and 1999 (bobsleigh).

The track was to have undergone a homologation to accommodate skeleton during the 2007–08 World Cup season in order for it to be used for the event, but that did not happen. Skeleton was last competed at Cortina in 1992. A World Cup event was set to take place in January 2009, but was cancelled to technical issues.

On 28 February 2009, it was announced at the world championships in Lake Placid, New York, in the United States that Königssee was selected in cooperation with the FIBT and the Bob- und Schlittenverband für Deutschland (BSD - German bobsleigh, luge, and skeleton federation).

== Bobsleigh ==
=== Two-man ===
Switzerland's duo of Ivo Rüegg and Cédric Grand are the defending world champions. Germany's André Lange and Kevin Kuske are the Olympic champions. Grand and Lange retired after the 2010 Winter Olympics.

Rank	Bib	Athlete	Country	Run 1	Run 2	Run 3	Run 4	Total	Behind
1st place, gold medalist(s)	1	Alexandr Zubkov; Alexey Voyevoda	Russia	50.31	50.25	50.20	49.96	3:20.72	
2nd place, silver medalist(s)	16	Thomas Florschütz; Kevin Kuske	Germany	50.50	50.17	50.29	49.94	3:20.90	+0.18
2nd place, silver medalist(s)	2	Manuel Machata; Andreas Bredau	Germany	50.51	50.26	50.24	49.89	3:20.90	+0.18
4	6	Beat Hefti; Thomas Lamparter	Switzerland	50.56	50.06	50.59	49.79	3:21.00	+0.28
5	7	Karl Angerer; Alexander Rödiger	Germany	50.85	50.28	50.27	49.87	3:21.27	+0.55
6	4	Steve Holcomb; Steven Langton	United States	50.60	50.38	50.26	50.27	3:21.51	+0.79
6	3	Simone Bertazzo; Matteo Torchio	Italy	50.62	50.40	50.31	50.18	3:21.51	+0.79
8	26	Nicolae Istrate; Florin Cezar Craciun	Romania	50.73	50.47	50.47	50.39	3:22.06	+1.34
9	5	Lyndon Rush; Neville Wright	Canada	51.05	50.53	50.51	50.14	3:22.23	+1.51
10	9	Gregor Baumann; Alex Baumann	Switzerland	50.89	50.59	50.53	50.24	3:22.25	+1.53
11	14	Francesco Friedrich; Marko Huebenbecker	Germany	50.80	50.68	50.49	50.31	3:22.28	+1.56
12	8	Patrice Servelle; Lascelles Brown	Monaco	50.96	50.71	50.55	50.24	3:22.46	+1.74
13	19	Oskars Melbārdis; Intars Dambis	Latvia	50.70	50.78	50.57	50.49	3:22.54	+1.82
14	11	Jürgen Loacker; Matthias Adolf	Austria	50.97	51.14	50.45	50.37	3:22.93	+2.21
15	17	Dawid Kupczyk; Marcin Niewiara	Poland	50.98	50.56	50.85	50.66	3:23.05	+2.33
16	13	Edgars Maskalāns; Daumants Dreiškens	Latvia	51.10	50.85	50.76	50.40	3:23.11	+2.39
17	10	Alexander Kasjanov; Maxim Belugin	Russia	51.17	50.80	50.72	50.48	3:23.17	+2.45
18	22	Edwin van Calker; Sybren Jansma	Netherlands	51.24	50.92	50.60	50.61	3:23.37	+2.65
19	18	Chris Spring; Timothy Randall	Canada	51.05	50.84	50.88	50.74	3:23.51	+2.79
20	20	John James Jackson; Bruce Tasker	United Kingdom	51.04	50.93	50.87	50.92	3:23.76	+3.04
21	24	Jan Vrba; Jan Stokláska	Czech Republic	51.24	50.93	50.71			
22	12	John Napier; Laszlo Vandracsek	United States	51.09	50.95	50.90			
23	15	Alexey Gorlachev; Alexander Ryabov	Russia	51.37	50.79	50.80			
24	23	Rico Peter; Thomas Ruf	Switzerland	51.20	51.08	50.85			
25	21	Cory Butner; Johnny Quinn	United States	51.46	50.86	51.02			
26	28	Lamin Deen; Richard Sharman	United Kingdom	51.45	51.34	51.49			
27	27	Thibault Alexis Godefroy; Vincent Daniel Ricard	France	51.78	51.35	51.38			
28	31	Bruno Meyerhans; Jürgen Berginz	Liechtenstein	52.24	51.73	51.63			
29	30	Marc Sluszny; Lino Vandoorne	Belgium	52.82	52.92	52.16			
30	25	Heath Spence; Dustin MacPherson	Australia	53.10	52.65	52.24			
31	32	Ivan Šola; Nikola Nimac	Croatia	54.38	53.65	53.36			
	29	Vuk Rađenović; Slobodan Matijević	Serbia	DNS					

=== Four-man ===
The Olympic and World champions are the American foursome of Steven Holcomb, Justin Olsen, Steve Mesler, and Curtis Tomasevicz.

Rank	Bib	Athlete	Country	Run 1	Run 2	Run 3	Run 4	Total	Behind
1st place, gold medalist(s)	1	Manuel Machata; Richard Adjei; Andreas Bredau; Christian Poser	Germany	48.65	48.79	49.26	49.88	3:16.58	
2nd place, silver medalist(s)	4	Karl Angerer; Christian Friedrich; Alex Mann; Gregor Bermbach	Germany	48.74	48.92	49.31	50.13	3:17.10	+0.52
3rd place, bronze medalist(s)	2	Steve Holcomb; Justin Olsen; Steven Langton; Curtis Tomasevicz	United States	48.81	49.01	49.46	49.98	3:17.26	+0.68
4	3	Alexandr Zubkov; Filipp Yegorov; Dmitry Trunenkov; Nikolay Hrenkov	Russia	48.78	49.00	49.39	50.28	3:17.45	+0.87
4	10	Maximilian Arndt; Jan Speer; Alexander Rödiger; Martin Putze	Germany	49.05	48.92	49.48	50.00	3:17.45	+0.87
6	6	Lyndon Rush; David Bissett; Cody Sorensen; Neville Wright	Canada	48.87	49.00	49.56	50.08	3:17.51	+0.93
7	15	Thomas Florschütz; Ronny Listner; Kevin Kuske; Andreas Barucha	Germany	49.01	49.09	49.48	50.16	3:17.74	+1.16
8	8	Gregor Baumann; Patrick Bloechliger; Alex Baumann; Juerg Egger	Switzerland	49.06	49.06	49.64	50.21	3:17.97	+1.39
9	7	Edgars Maskalāns; Daumants Dreiškens; Ugis Zalims; Intars Dambis	Latvia	49.06	49.10	49.69	50.53	3:18.38	+1.80
10	5	Alexander Kasjanov; Andrey Yurkov; Dmitriy Stepushkin; Maxim Belugin	Russia	49.02	49.14	49.77	50.55	3:18.48	+1.90
11	12	Alexey Gorlachev; Petr Moiseev; Alexey Kireev; Sergey Prudnikov	Russia	49.29	49.07	49.89	50.52	3:18.77	+2.19
12	14	Beat Hefti; Roman Handschin; Thomas Lamparter; Manuel Luethi	Switzerland	49.22	49.13	49.88	50.55	3:18.78	+2.20
13	18	Jürgen Loacker; Juergen Mayer; Matthias Adolf; Martin Lachkovics	Austria	49.16	49.22	50.03	50.41	3:18.82	+2.24
14	22	Chris Spring; Timothy Randall; Derek Plug; Graeme Rinholm	Canada	49.17	49.27	50.02	50.60	3:19.06	+2.48
15	24	Oskars Melbārdis; Raivis Broks; Mihails Arhipovs; Janis Strenga	Latvia	49.48	49.34	49.86	50.47	3:19.15	+2.57
16	25	Edwin van Calker; Yannick Greiner; Sybren Jansma; Arno Klaassen	Netherlands	49.27	49.18	50.04	50.68	3:19.17	+2.59
17	16	Jan Vrba; Dominik Suchý; Martin Bohmann; Jan Stokláska	Czech Republic	49.27	49.22	50.20	50.76	3:19.45	+2.87
18	17	Dawid Kupczyk; Michal Kasperowicz; Marcin Niewiara; Paweł Mróz	Poland	49.28	49.29	50.21	50.73	3:19.51	+2.93
19	13	John Napier; Jared Clugston; Laszlo Vandracsek; Jesse Beckom	United States	49.31	49.21	50.44	51.09	3:20.05	+3.47
20	9	Simone Bertazzo; Matteo Torchio; Samuele Romanini; Sergio Riva	Italy	49.38	49.54	50.51	51.05	3:20.48	+3.90
21	23	Rico Peter; Thomas Ruf; Fabio Badraun; Thomas Landolt	Switzerland	49.54	49.42	50.62			
22	21	John James Jackson; Dave Smith; Bruce Tasker; Christopher Wolley	United Kingdom	49.59	49.53	50.67			
23	20	Nicolae Istrate; Ionuţ Andrei; Bogdan Laurentiu Otava; Florin Cezar Craciun	Romania	49.65	49.56	50.89			
24	28	Vuk Radjenovic; Uros Stegel; Milos Savic; Damjan Zlatnar	Serbia	49.96	49.88	51.20			
25	33	Hiroshi Suzuki; Tohru Sakurai; Ryuichi Kobayashi; Kota Imai	Japan	49.96	50.00	51.49			
26	29	Thibault Alexis Godefroy; Alexandre Lhomel; Julien Bernard-Godet; Alexandre Jolivet	France	50.13	49.94	51.40			
27	19	Milan Jagnešák; Martin Tešovič; Andrej Bician; Juraj Mokrás	Slovakia	50.01	50.00	51.58			
28	26	Cory Butner; Codie Bascue; Kameron Hart; Johnny Quinn	United States	50.15	50.00	51.56			
29	27	Dorin-Alexandru Grigore; Emilian Pertea; Danut Stancu; Florin Barcacila Bogdan	Romania	50.16	50.34	51.63			
30	32	Ivan Šola; Drazen Silic; Mate Mezulić; Igor Marić	Croatia	50.84	50.38	52.00			
31	31	Heath Spence; Christian Wulff; Joshua Kelly; Dustin MacPherson	Australia	50.78	50.81	52.85			
32	30	Marc Sluszny; Thomas Siech; Lino Vandoorne; Korneel Deblock	Belgium	51.37	51.76	53.63			
	11	Patrice Servelle; Joffrey Tocant; Lascelles Brown; Elly Lefort	Monaco	49.42	49.67	DNS			

=== Two-woman ===
The British duo of Nicole Minichiello and Gillian Cooke are the defending World Champions. Canada's Kaillie Humphries and Heather Moyse are the Olympic champions. Minichiello will not compete this season to injuries sustained during the 2010 Winter Olympics. Humphries and Moyse won Canada's first ever World Championship medal in women's bobsleigh with their bronze medal performance.

Rank	Bib	Athlete	Country	Run 1	Run 2	Run 3	Run 4	Total	Behind
1st place, gold medalist(s)	2	Cathleen Martini; Romy Logsch	Germany	51.36	51.41	51.69	51.65	3:26.11	
2nd place, silver medalist(s)	4	Shauna Rohbock; Valerie Fleming	United States	51.44	51.44	51.85	51.60	3:26.33	+0.22
3rd place, bronze medalist(s)	3	Kaillie Humphries; Heather Moyse	Canada	51.36	51.59	52.01	51.78	3:26.74	+0.63
4	1	Sandra Kiriasis; Berit Wiacker	Germany	51.56	51.40	52.08	51.77	3:26.81	+0.70
5	5	Helen Upperton; Shelley-Ann Brown	Canada	51.55	51.58	52.03	51.83	3:26.99	+0.88
6	6	Esmé Kamphuis; Judith Vis	Netherlands	51.87	51.78	51.92	51.95	3:27.52	+1.41
7	9	Sabina Hafner; Caroline Spahni	Switzerland	51.76	51.77	52.24	51.97	3:27.74	+1.63
8	8	Anja Schneiderheinze; Christin Senkel	Germany	51.74	51.77	52.52	52.06	3:28.09	+1.98
9	14	Elana Meyers; Jamie Greubel	United States	51.78	51.78	52.68	52.09	3:28.33	+2.22
10	10	Bree Schaaf; Emily Azevedo	United States	51.80	51.99	52.54	52.01	3:28.34	+2.23
11	7	Fabienne Meyer; Hanne Schenk	Switzerland	51.61	52.03	52.95	51.94	3:28.53	+2.42
12	15	Olga Fyodorova; Yulia Timofeeva	Russia	52.02	52.01	52.32	52.31	3:28.66	+2.55
13	11	Paula Walker; Rebekah Wilson	United Kingdom	52.00	51.85	52.89	51.94	3:28.68	+2.57
14	18	Astrid Loch-Wilkinson; Fiona Cullen	Australia	52.05	52.17	52.73	52.52	3:29.47	+3.36
15	12	Anastasiya Skulkina; Margarita Ismailova	Russia	52.25	52.40	52.63	52.24	3:29.52	+3.41
16	13	Christina Hengster; Anna Feichtner	Austria	52.13	52.12	53.02	52.85	3:30.12	+4.01
17	17	Elfje Willemsen; Anouska Hellebuyck	Belgium	52.37	52.81	52.90	52.49	3:30.57	+4.46
18	16	Viktoria Tokovaya; Natalya Kalashnik	Russia	52.55	52.78	53.26	53.13	3:31.72	+5.61
19	19	Carmen Tronescu; Alina Vera Savin	Romania	53.01	53.19	53.22	53.28	3:32.70	+6.59
20	22	Andreea Olimpia Popescu; Maria Dragan	Romania	52.91	52.97	53.31	53.56	3:32.75	+6.64
21	20	Fiona Harrison; Gillian Cooke	United Kingdom	53.35	53.01	53.70			
22	21	Eva Willemarck; Els de Groote	Belgium	53.31	53.54	53.24			

== Skeleton ==
=== Men ===
Switzerland's Gregor Stähli is the defending World champion. Canada's Jon Montgomery is the Olympic champion.

Rank	Bib	Athlete	Country	Run 1	Run 2	Run 3	Run 4	Total	Behind
1st place, gold medalist(s)	1	Martins Dukurs	Latvia	51.18	50.67	50.94	50.91	3:23.70	
2nd place, silver medalist(s)	5	Aleksandr Tretyakov	Russia	51.43	51.14	51.62	51.25	3:25.44	+1.74
3rd place, bronze medalist(s)	3	Frank Rommel	Germany	51.71	51.14	51.53	51.30	3:25.68	+1.98
4	2	Sandro Stielicke	Germany	51.42	51.13	51.87	51.56	3:25.98	+2.28
5	6	Michi Halilović	Germany	51.29	51.13	51.68	51.89	3:25.99	+2.29
6	12	Kristan Bromley	United Kingdom	51.48	51.23	51.85	51.72	3:26.28	+2.58
7	7	Matthew Antoine	United States	51.92	51.50	51.98	51.37	3:26.77	+3.07
8	15	Alexander Kröckel	Germany	51.79	51.57	52.13	51.66	3:27.15	+3.45
9	8	Tomass Dukurs	Latvia	51.75	51.45	52.25	51.77	3:27.22	+3.52
10	4	Sergey Chudinov	Russia	51.83	51.65	52.14	51.91	3:27.53	+3.83
11	9	Jon Montgomery	Canada	51.74	51.43	52.53	51.96	3:27.66	+3.96
12	21	Ben Sandford	New Zealand	51.99	51.63	52.42	51.94	3:27.98	+4.28
13	14	Michael Douglas	Canada	52.23	51.48	52.50	51.86	3:28.07	+4.37
14	11	Chris Type	United Kingdom	52.23	51.47	52.50	51.88	3:28.08	+4.38
15	13	John Fairbairn	Canada	51.96	51.52	52.93	52.01	3:28.42	+4.72
16	16	Andy Wood	United Kingdom	52.24	51.57	52.66	52.46	3:28.93	+5.23
17	10	John Daly	United States	52.08	52.30	52.39	52.63	3:29.40	+5.70
18	20	Anže Šetina	Slovenia	52.25	52.34	52.70	52.31	3:29.60	+5.90
19	23	Hiroatsu Takahashi	Japan	51.83	52.17	52.89	53.05	3:29.94	+6.24
20	18	Pascal Oswald	Switzerland	53.63	51.78	52.25	52.29	3:29.95	+6.25
21	28	Lukas Kummer	Switzerland	52.50	52.30	52.88			
22	19	Matthias Guggenberger	Austria	52.48	52.61	53.07			
23	27	John Farrow	Australia	52.42	52.53	53.34			
24	22	Maurizio Oioli	Italy	52.74	52.71	53.00			
25	17	Kyle Tress	United States	52.97	52.47	53.02			
26	24	Ander Mirambell	Spain	52.86	52.49	53.18			
27	25	Yuki Sasahara	Japan	53.49	52.66	53.10			
28	26	Giovanni Mulassano	Italy	53.29	53.13	53.90			
29	33	Jakub Holoubek	Czech Republic	54.02	53.37	53.64			
30	32	Emilio Strapasson	Brazil	54.17	54.00	53.58			
31	30	Dorin Dumitru Velicu	Romania	55.13	52.55	54.20			
32	31	Matt Skolnik	Slovakia	54.08	53.36	54.57			
33	29	Bradley Chalupski	Israel	54.56	54.34	54.88			
34	34	Lee Webster	South Africa	54.69	54.76	54.72			

=== Women ===
Germany's Marion Thees (Trott until summer 2010) is the defending World champion. Britain's Amy Williams is the Olympic champion.

Rank	Bib	Athlete	Country	Run 1	Run 2	Run 3	Run 4	Total	Behind
1st place, gold medalist(s)	4	Marion Thees	Germany	52.22	52.21	52.07	52.01	3:28.51	
2nd place, silver medalist(s)	1	Anja Huber	Germany	52.44	52.14	52.35	52.46	3:29.39	+0.88
3rd place, bronze medalist(s)	3	Mellisa Hollingsworth	Canada	52.64	52.34	52.46	52.30	3:29.74	+1.23
4	2	Shelley Rudman	United Kingdom	53.14	52.45	52.24	52.22	3:30.05	+1.54
5	10	Olga Potylitsina	Russia	53.10	52.50	52.40	52.70	3:30.70	+2.19
6	8	Katharina Heinz	Germany	52.88	52.68	52.76	52.55	3:30.87	+2.36
7	5	Amy Gough	Canada	52.81	52.64	52.84	52.70	3:30.99	+2.48
8	7	Darla Deschamps	Canada	53.00	52.64	52.87	52.70	3:31.21	+2.70
9	17	Katie Uhlaender	United States	53.36	52.75	52.58	52.82	3:31.51	+3.00
10	19	Yelena Yudina	Russia	53.29	52.73	52.76	52.87	3:31.65	+3.14
11	25	Robynne Thompson	Canada	53.07	53.46	53.55	53.06	3:33.14	+4.63
12	9	Emma Lincoln-Smith	Australia	53.33	53.62	53.45	52.83	3:33.23	+4.72
13	6	Donna Creighton	United Kingdom	53.48	53.20	53.55	53.06	3:33.29	+4.78
14	13	Katharine Eustace	New Zealand	54.12	52.91	53.60	52.77	3:33.40	+4.89
15	15	Lucy Chaffer	Australia	53.75	53.72	53.00	53.53	3:34.00	+5.49
16	16	Kimber Gabryszak	United States	53.80	53.78	53.10	53.49	3:34.17	+5.66
17	18	Joska Le Conté	Netherlands	54.15	53.43	53.41	53.40	3:34.39	+5.88
18	11	Nozomi Komuro	Japan	54.11	53.36	53.44	53.49	3:34.40	+5.89
19	14	Janine Flock	Austria	53.33	53.57	53.82	54.31	3:35.03	+6.52
20	23	Jessica Kilian	Switzerland	53.75	53.68	53.70	54.61	3:35.74	+7.23
21	22	Michaela Glässer	Czech Republic	54.07	53.52	53.60			
22	20	Maria Orlova	Russia	53.59	53.74	53.95			
23	12	Anne O'Shea	United States	53.65	53.89	53.87			
24	21	Barbara Hosch	Switzerland	54.62	54.61	53.96			
25	26	Delia Andreea Ivas	Romania	54.51	54.44	54.65			
26	24	Maria Marinela Mazilu	Romania	55.22	55.48	54.85			

== Mixed team ==
The mixed team event – consisting of one run each of men's skeleton, women's skeleton, 2-man bobsleigh, and 2-women bobsleigh – debuted at the 2007 championships. Germany won its fourth consecutive mixed team championship.

Rank	Bib	Athlete	Country	Run 1	Run 2	Run 3	Run 4	Total	Behind
1st place, gold medalist(s)	11	Michi Halilović; Sandra Kiriasis / Stephanie Schneider; Marion Thees; Francesco Friedrich / Florian Becke	Germany	51.40	51.60	52.82	50.27	3:26.09	
2nd place, silver medalist(s)	6	Frank Rommel; Cathleen Martini / Kristin Steinert; Anja Huber; Karl Angerer / Alex Mann	Germany	51.52	51.50	52.74	50.39	3:26.15	+0.06
3rd place, bronze medalist(s)	4	Jon Montgomery; Kaillie Humphries / Heather Moyse; Mellisa Hollingsworth; Lyndon Rush / Cody Sorensen	Canada	51.54	51.40	53.67	50.35	3:26.96	+0.87
4	3	Kristan Bromley; Paula Walker / Rebekah Wilson; Shelley Rudman; John James Jackson / Bruce Tasker	United Kingdom	51.85	51.72	53.34	50.83	3:27.74	+1.65
5	5	Sergey Chudinov; Olga Fyodorova / Yulia Timofeeva; Olga Potelitcina; Alexandr Zubkov / Alexey Voyevoda	Russia	51.97	51.91	53.90	50.28	3:28.06	+1.97
6	14	Aleksandr Tretyakov; Anastasiya Skulkina / Margarita Ismailova; Yelena Yudina; Alexander Kasjanov / Maxim Belugin	Russia	51.50	52.18	53.89	50.67	3:28.24	+2.15
7	10	Michael Douglas; Helen Upperton / Shelley-Ann Brown; Amy Gough; Chris Spring / Derek Plug	Canada	52.49	51.61	53.97	50.89	3:28.96	+2.87
8	15	John Daly; Elana Meyers / Kristi Koplin; Anne O'Shea; John Napier / Jesse Beckom	United States	51.88	51.84	55.05	50.58	3:29.35	+3.26
9	12	Matthew Antoine; Bree Schaaf / Emily Azevedo; Katie Uhlaender; Steve Holcomb / Curtis Tomasevicz	United States	52.61	51.81	54.66	50.45	3:29.53	+3.44
10	2	Pascal Oswald; Sabina Hafner / Michelle Huwiler; Jessica Kilian; Gregor Baumann / Juerg Egger	Switzerland	52.91	51.73	54.91	50.34	3:29.89	+3.80
11	13	Matthias Guggenberger; Christina Hengster / Inga Versen; Janine Flock; Jürgen Loacker / Johannes Wipplinger	Austria	52.43	52.81	54.65	50.75	3:30.64	+4.55
12	9	Lukas Kummer; Fabienne Meyer / Eveline Gerber; Barbara Hosch; Rico Peter / Fabio Badraun	Switzerland	53.06	51.93	55.41	50.81	3:31.21	+5.12
13	1	Andy Wood; Fiona Harrison / Gillian Cooke; Donna Creighton; Lamin Deen / Richard Sharman	United Kingdom	53.21	53.16	54.24	51.15	3:31.76	+5.67
14	7	John Farrow; Astrid Loch-Wilkinson / Jamie Hedge; Emma Lincoln-Smith; Heath Spence / Joshua Kelly	Australia	53.41	52.33	54.09	52.50	3:32.33	+6.24
15	8	Silviu Alexandru Mesarosi; Carmen Tronescu / Alina Vera Savin; Maria Marinela Mazilu; Nicolae Istrate / Florin Cezar Craciun	Romania	53.44	53.26	55.67	50.72	3:33.09	+7.00

== Medal table ==
Rank	Nation	Gold	Silver	Bronze	Total
1	Germany (GER)	4	5	1	10
2	Russia (RUS)	1	1	0	2
3	Latvia (LAT)	1	0	0	1
4	United States (USA)	0	1	1	2
5	Canada (CAN)	0	0	3	3
Totals (5 entries)		6	7	5	18
