= FIBT World Championships 2013 =

Bobsleigh and skeleton competition

2013 World Championships
- Location: St. Moritz, Switzerland

The FIBT World Championships 2013 took place at the St. Moritz-Celerina Olympic Bobrun in St. Moritz, Switzerland, for the record twenty-second time, after hosting the event previously in 1931 (Four-man), 1935 (Four-man), 1937 (Four-man), 1938 (Two-man), 1939 (Two-man), 1947, 1955, 1957, 1959, 1965, 1970, 1974, 1977, 1982, 1987, 1989 (Skeleton), 1990 (Bobsleigh), 1997 (Bobsleigh), 1998 (Skeleton), 2001 (Men's bobsleigh), and 2007.

Switzerland was scheduled to host the 2012 World Championships, but the 2012 location was switched to Lake Placid, New York, in December 2010. The FIBT switched the locations to accommodate a shorter trip for athletes and equipment to Sochi, Russia in 2013 so that athletes will gain practice time on the 2014 Olympic track in Sochi.

== Bobsleigh ==
=== Two men ===
Rank	Bib	Athlete	Country	Run 1	Run 2	Run 3	Run 4	Total	Behind
1st place, gold medalist(s)	38	Francesco Friedrich; Jannis Bäcker	Germany	1:05.59 (1)	1:05.51 (1)	1:06.34 (3)	1:05.34 (1)	4:22.78	
2nd place, silver medalist(s)	33	Beat Hefti; Thomas Lamparter	Switzerland	1:05.79 (2)	1:05.66 (2)	1:06.32 (2)	1:05.57 (2)	4:23.34	+0.56
3rd place, bronze medalist(s)	35	Thomas Florschütz; Andreas Bredau	Germany	1:06.17 (7)	1:05.86 (6)	1:06.34 (3)	1:05.60 (3)	4:23.97	+1.19
4	34	Steven Holcomb; Steven Langton	United States	1:06.06 (3)	1:05.81 (3)	1:06.48 (6)	1:05.70 (5)	4:24.05	+1.27
5	35	Oskars Melbārdis; Daumants Dreiškens	Latvia	1:06.15 (6)	1:06.08 (11)	1:06.36 (5)	1:05.66 (4)	4:24.25	+1.47
6	29	Christopher Spring; Lascelles Brown	Canada	1:06.13 (5)	1:05.83 (4)	1:06.53 (7)	1:05.84 (6)	4:24.33	+1.55
7	32	Alexandr Zubkov; Dmitry Trunenkov	Russia	1:06.06 (3)	1:05.84 (5)	1:06.54 (8)	1:05.92 (9)	4:24.36	+1.58
8	37	Lyndon Rush; Jesse Lumsden	Canada	1:06.33 (10)	1:06.07 (10)	1:06.18 (1)	1:05.85 (7)	4:24.43	+1.65
9	30	Cory Butner; Christopher Fogt	United States	1:06.22 (8)	1:05.97 (7)	1:06.76 (12)	1:05.86 (8)	4:24.81	+2.03
10	12	Maximilian Arndt; Marko Huebenbecker	Germany	1:06.23 (9)	1:05.99 (8)	1:06.75 (11)	1:06.07 (11)	4:25.04	+2.26
11	23	Rico Peter; Simon Friedli	Switzerland	1:06.41 (13)	1:06.16 (14)	1:06.57 (9)	1:06.00 (10)	4:25.14	+2.36
12	28	Justin Kripps; Neville Wright	Canada	1:06.37 (12)	1:06.12 (13)	1:06.80 (14)	1:06.33 (12	4:25.62	+2.84
13	18	Edwin van Calker; Sybren Jansma	Netherlands	1:06.52 (15)	1:06.01 (9)	1:06.70 (10)	1:06.51 (14	4:25.74	+2.96
13	27	Nick Cunningham; Dallas Robinson	United States	1:06.44 (14)	1:06.10 (12)	1:06.82 (15)	1:06.38 (13)	4:25.74	+2.96
15	31	Simone Bertazzo; Costantino Ughi	Italy	1:06.55 (16)	1:06.51 (16)	1:06.76 (12)	1:06.58 (15)	4:26.40	+3.62
16	22	Jan Vrba; Jan Stokláska	Czech Republic	1:06.75 (19)	1:06.86 (20)	1:06.84 (16)	1:06.65 (16)	4:27.10	+4.32
17	21	Loic Costerg; Romain Heinrich	France	1:06.70 (17)	1:06.45 (15)	1:07.16 (19)	1:06.83 (17)	4:27.14	+4.36
18	17	Oskars Ķibermanis; Raivis Zirups	Latvia	1:06.88 (20)	1:06.66 (18)	1:07.03 (17)	1:07.03 (18)	4:27.60	+4.82
19	25	John James Jackson; Craig Pickering	Great Britain	1:07.08 (22)	1:06.58 (17)	1:07.23 (21)	1:07.31 (19	4:28.20	+5.42
20	15	Patrice Servelle; Elly Lefort	Monaco	1:06.91 (21)	1:06.90 (21)	1:07.48 (25)	1:07.50 (20)	4:28.79	+6.01
21	20	Dawid Kupczyk; Marcin Niewiara	Poland	1:07.26 (24)	1:06.90 (21)	1:07.18 (20)		3:21.34	
22	8	Michael Serise; Lino Vandoorne	Belgium	1:07.40 (25)	1:07.03 (25)	1:07.09 (18)		3:21.52	
23	11	Dorin-Alexandru Grigore; Florin Cezar Crăciun	Romania	1:07.13 (23)	1:07.27 (29)	1:07.30 (23)		3:21.70	
24	14	Lamin Deen; Ben Simons	Great Britain	1:07.58 (26)	1:06.93 (23)	1:07.53 (27)		3:22.04	
25	16	Heath Spence; Lucas Mata	Australia	1:07.73 (28)	1:07.10 (28)	1:07.25 (22)		3:22.08	
26	7	Mateusz Luty; Michal Kasperowicz	Poland	1:07.69 (27)	1:07.06 (26)	1:07.43 (24)		3:22.18	
27	4	Vuk Rađenović; Damjan Zlatnar	Serbia	1:07.76 (29)	1:06.82 (19)	1:07.67 (30)		3:22.25	
28	19	Michael Klingler; Bruno Meyerhans	Liechtenstein	1:07.88 (30)	1:07.09 (27)	1:07.56 (28)		3:22.53	
29	5	Benjamin Maier; Sebastian Heufler	Austria	1:08.04 (32)	1:06.96 (24)	1:07.57 (29)		3:22.57	
30	13	Milan Jagnešák; Vladimír Šimík	Slovakia	1:07.92 (31)	1:07.50 (30)	1:07.73 (31)		3:23.15	
31	9	Kim Dong-Hyun; Jun Jung-lin	South Korea	1:08.22 (33)	1:07.72 (31)	1:07.48 (25)		3:23.42	
32	6	Eduardo Fonseca; Jonathan Romero	Panama	1:08.47 (35)	1:07.76 (32)	1:08.47 (33)		3:24.70	
33	2	Michele Menardi; Paolo Leonardo Biglieri	Argentina	1:09.05 (37)	1:08.10 (34)	1:08.41 (32)		3:25.56	
34	3	Olexander Shumakov; Andrii Tkachuk	Ukraine	1:08.86 (36)	1:08.81 (35)	1:08.83 (34)		3:26.50	
35	1	Ivan Šola; Drazen Silic	Croatia	1:11.05 (38)	1:09.92 (36)	1:09.91 (35)		3:30.88	
	10	Won Yun-Jong; Suk Young-Lin	South Korea	1:08.36 (34)	1:07.90 (33)	DNF			
	26	Alexander Kasjanov; Maxim Belugin	Russia	1:06.36 (11)	DSQ			DSQ	
	24	Alexey Stulnev; Alexey Voyevoda	Russia	1:06.74 (18)	DSQ			DSQ	

=== Four men ===
Rank	Bib	Athlete	Country	Run 1	Run 2	Run 3	Run 4	Total	Behind
1st place, gold medalist(s)	34	Maximilian Arndt; Marko Huebenbecker; Alexander Rödiger; Martin Putze	Germany	1:05.21 (1)	1:05.68 (9)	1:05.09 (1)	1:04.69 (2)	4:20.67	
2nd place, silver medalist(s)	32	Alexandr Zubkov; Alexey Negodaylo; Dmitry Trunenkov; Maxim Mokrousov	Russia	1:05.26 (2)	1:05.58 (3)	1:05.50 (17)	1:04.80 (7)	4:21.14	+0.47
3rd place, bronze medalist(s)	28	Steven Holcomb; Justin Olsen; Steven Langton; Curtis Tomasevicz	United States	1:05.55 (4)	1:05.59 (4)	1:05.47 (16)	1:04.65 (1)	4:21.26	+0.59
4	26	Beat Hefti; Alex Baumann; Thomas Lamparter; Juerg Egger	Switzerland	1:05.65 (8)	1:05.50 (2)	1:05.41 (10)	1:04.74 (3)	4:21.30	+0.63
5	29	John James Jackson; Stuart Benson; Bruce Tasker; Joel Fearon	Great Britain	1:05.84 (13)	1:05.46 (1)	1:05.26 (6)	1:04.77 (4)	4:21.33	+0.66
6	19	Rico Peter; Thomas Ruf; Patrick Bloechliger; Simon Friedli	Switzerland	1:05.68 (10)	1:05.66 (7)	1:05.21 (4)	1:04.79 (6)	4:21.34	+0.67
7	30	Thomas Florschütz; Andreas Bredau; Ronny Listner; Thomas Blaschek	Germany	1:05.63 (6)	1:05.66 (7)	1:05.34 (8)	1:04.78 (5)	4:21.41	+0.74
8	33	Manuel Machata; Jannis Bäcker; Jan Speer; Christian Poser	Germany	1:05.59 (5)	1:05.69 (10)	1:05.41 (10)	1:04.99 (9)	4:21.68	+1.01
9	31	Oskars Melbārdis; Daumants Dreiškens; Arvis Vilkaste; Intars Dambis	Latvia	1:05.53 (3)	1:05.97 (16)	1:05.29 (7)	1:05.00 (10)	4:21.79	+1.12
10	25	Alexander Kasjanov; Petr Moiseev; Maxim Belugin; Kirill Antukh	Russia	1:05.67 (9)	1:05.65 (6)	1:05.54 (20)	1:04.97 (8)	4:21.83	+1.16
11	24	Dmitry Abramovitch; Aleksei Pushkarev; Dmitriy Stepushkin; Alexey Voyevoda	Russia	1:05.82 (12)	1:05.69 (10)	1:05.23 (5)	1:05.15 (14)	4:21.89	+1.22
12	23	Jan Vrba; Dominik Dvorak; Jan Stokláska; Michal Vacek	Czech Republic	1:05.89 (14)	1:05.79 (12)	1:05.19 (3)	1:05.12 (12)	4:21.99	+1.32
13	13	Francesco Friedrich; Axel Christ; Gino Gerhardi; Thorsten Margis	Germany	1:05.64 (7)	1:05.61 (5)	1:05.51 (18)	1:05.32 (18)	4:22.08	+1.41
14	9	Edwin van Calker; Yannick Greiner; Sybren Jansma; Jeroen Piek	Netherlands	1:06.11 (20)	1:05.83 (13)	1:05.14 (2)	1:05.17 (16)	4:22.25	+1.58
15	27	Lyndon Rush; Jesse Lumsden; Lascelles Brown; Neville Wright	Canada	1:05.69 (11)	1:06.18 (20)	1:05.44 (14)	1:05.04 (11)	4:22.35	+1.68
16	17	Oskars Ķibermanis; Uģis Žaļims; Raivis Broks; Jānis Strenga	Latvia	1:05.91 (16)	1:05.89 (14)	1:05.40 (9)	1:05.21 (17)	4:22.41	+1.74
17	16	Christopher Spring; Jean-Nicolas Carrière; Cody Sorensen; Sam Giguère	Canada	1:06.00 (17)	1:05.99 (17)	1:05.46 (15)	1:05.13 (13)	4:22.58	+1.91
18	18	Simone Bertazzo; Simone Fontana; Costantino Ughi; Francesco Costa	Italy	1:06.03 (18)	1:05.92 (15)	1:05.42 (12)	1:05.44 (19)	4:22.81	+2.14
19	22	Nick Cunningham; Adam Clark; Andreas Drbal; Christopher Fogt	United States	1:06.20 (21)	1:06.08 (18)	1:05.42 (12)	1:05.15 (14)	4:22.85	+2.18
20	12	Dawid Kupczyk; Daniel Zalewski; Paweł Mróz; Marcin Niewiara	Poland	1:06.09 (19)	1:06.23 (21)	1:05.73 (21)	1:05.83 (20)	4:23.88	+3.21
21	15	Justin Kripps; Timothy Randall; James McNaughton; Graeme Rinholm	Canada	1:06.33 (22)	1:06.43 (22)	1:05.53 (19)		3:18.29	
22	21	Jürgen Loacker; Matthias Adolf; Markus Sammer; Martin Lachkovics	Austria	1:05.89 (14)	1:06.13 (19)	1:06.35 (32)		3:18.37	
23	11	Lamin Deen; David Coleman; Ben Simons; Andrew Matthews	Great Britain	1:06.47 (23)	1:06.65 (29)	1:05.82 (23)		3:18.94	
24	7	Loic Costerg; Romain Heinrich; Florent Ribet; Jeremie Boutherin	France	1:06.67 (26)	1:06.54 (23)	1:05.74 (22)		3:18.95	
25	14	Milan Jagnešák; Martin Tešovič; Vladimír Šimík; Adam Zavacky	Slovakia	1:06.60 (25)	1:06.92 (30)	1:05.88 (25)		3:19.40	
26	3	Andreas Neagu; Marian Iorga; Paul Septimiu Muntean; Danut Moldovan	Romania	1:06.80 (28)	1:06.56 (24	1:06.08 (29)		3:19.44	
27	6	Lukas Gschitzer; Danilo Zanarotto; Luca Pagin; William Frullani	Italy	1:06.94 (30)	1:06.60 (27)	1:05.95 (26)		3:19.49	
28	10	Vuk Rađenović; Uros Stegel; Nikola Milinković; Damjan Zlatnar	Serbia	1:06.68 (27)	1:06.57 (25)	1:06.30 (31)		3:19.55	
29	1	Patrice Servelle; Boris Vain; Elly Lefort; Brisse Niahoua	Monaco	1:07.09 (31)	1:06.62 (28)	1:05.87 (24)		3:19.58	
30	20	Codie Bascue; Jesse Beckom; Johnny Quinn; Nicholas Taylor	United States	1:06.56 (24)	1:07.03 (33)	1:06.16 (30)		3:19.75	
31	8	Michael Klingler; Bruno Meyerhans; Jürgen Berginz; Thomas Dürr	Liechtenstein	1:07.17 (32)	1:06.58 (26)	1:06.05 (28)		3:19.80	
32	4	Michael Serise; Sebastien Trouillez; Lino Vandoorne; Michael Dezutter	Belgium	1:06.88 (29)	1:06.97 (31)	1:06.00 (27)		3:19.85	
33	5	Heath Spence; Gareth Nichols; Ben Lisson; Lucas Mata	Australia	1:07.27 (33)	1:07.01 (32)	1:06.70 (34)		3:20.98	
34	2	Ivan Šola; Drazen Silic; Mate Mezulić; Marko Padovan	Croatia	1:07.62 (34)	1:07.10 (34)	1:06.56 (33)		3:21.28	

=== Two women ===
Rank	Bib	Athlete	Country	Run 1	Run 2	Run 3	Run 4	Total	Behind
1st place, gold medalist(s)	22	Kaillie Humphries; Chelsea Valois	Canada	1:08.18 (1)	1:07.88 (2)	1:07.22 (2)	1:07.03 (1)	4:30.31	
2nd place, silver medalist(s)	15	Elana Meyers; Katie Eberling	United States	1:08.30 (2)	1:07.94 (3)	1:07.59 (5)	1:07.16 (4)	4:30.99	+0.68
3rd place, bronze medalist(s)	18	Sandra Kiriasis; Franziska Bertels	Germany	1:08.42 (5)	1:08.24 (5)	1:07.13 (1)	1:07.22 (5)	4:31.01	+0.70
4	19	Cathleen Martini; Stephanie Schneider	Germany	1:08.39 (4)	1:08.00 (4)	1:07.46 (4)	1:07.23 (6)	4:31.08	+0.77
5	21	Anja Schneiderheinze; Lisette Thöne	Germany	1:08.37 (3)	1:07.81 (1)	1:07.88 (11)	1:07.04 (2)	4:31.10	+0.79
6	20	Esmé Kamphuis; Judith Vis	Netherlands	1:08.45 (6)	1:08.35 (8)	1:07.28 (3)	1:07.08 (3)	4:31.16	+0.85
7	10	Miriam Wagner; Franziska Fritz	Germany	1:08.73 (7)	1:08.42 (9)	1:07.88 (11)	1:07.59 (10)	4:32.62	+2.31
8	13	Jazmine Fenlator; Aja Evans	United States	1:08.84 (10)	1:08.30 (6)	1:08.19 (15)	1:07.32 (7)	4:32.65	+2.34
9	16	Fabienne Meyer; Elisabeth Graf	Switzerland	1:08.78 (9)	1:08.72 (10)	1:07.77 (7)	1:07.53 (9)	4:32.80	+2.49
10	11	Caroline Spahni; Ariane Walser	Switzerland	1:08.75 (8)	1:08.33 (7)	1:08.04 (14)	1:07.79 (13)	4:32.91	+2.60
11	5	Anastasia Tambovtseva; Liudmila Udobkina	Russia	1:09.05 (14)	1:08.88 (13)	1:07.78 (8)	1:07.44 (8)	4:33.15	+2.84
12	8	Olga Stulneva; Margarita Ismailova	Russia	1:09.17 (15)	1:09.16 (15)	1:07.72 (6)	1:07.64 (11)	4:33.69	+3.38
13	17	Christina Hengster; Inga Versen	Austria	1:08.98 (11)	1:09.20 (16)	1:07.84 (10)	1:07.76 (12)	4:33.78	+3.47
14	14	Paula Walker; Gillian Cooke	Great Britain	1:09.02 (12)	1:08.82 (11)	1:08.26 (18)	1:08.00 (15)	4:34.10	+3.79
15	12	Jamie Greubel; Emily Azevedo	United States	1:09.03 (13)	1:08.86 (12)	1:08.20 (16)	1:08.06 (17)	4:34.15	+3.84
16	9	Astrid Radjenovic; Jana Pittman	Australia	1:09.37 (17)	1:09.32 (17)	1:07.78 (8)	1:07.84 (14)	4:34.31	+4.00
17	2	Victoria Olaoye; Kelly Denyer	Great Britain	1:09.43 (19)	1:09.43 (19)	1:07.90 (13)	1:08.05 (16)	4:34.81	+4.50
18	7	Jennifer Ciochetti; Kate O'Brien	Canada	1:09.39 (18)	1:09.34 (18)	1:08.21 (17)	1:08.20 (19)	4:35.14	+4.83
19	6	Elfje Willemsen; Hanna Mariën	Belgium	1:09.35 (16)	1:09.14 (14)	1:08.51 (19)	1:08.15 (18)	4:35.15	+4.84
20	3	Mica McNeill; Nikki McSweeney	Great Britain	1:10.12 (21)	1:09.80 (20)	1:08.96 (20)	1:08.64 (20)	4:37.52	+7.21
21	4	Maria Constantin; Andreea Grecu	Romania	1:10.10 (20)	1:10.28 (21)	1:10.05 (22)		3:30.43	
22	1	Eugenia Oana Diaconu; Cristine Spataru	Romania	1:10.38 (22)	1:10.55 (22)	1:09.56 (21)		3:30.49	

== Skeleton ==
=== Men ===
Rank	Bib	Athlete	Country	Run 1	Run 2	Run 3	Run 4	Total	Behind
1st place, gold medalist(s)	5	Aleksandr Tretyakov	Russia	1:07.85 (1)	1:07.92 (1)	1:08.35 (1)	1:08.23 (2)	4:32.35	
2nd place, silver medalist(s)	30	Martins Dukurs	Latvia	1:07.87 (2)	1:07.99 (2)	1:08.72 (3)	1:07.80 (1)	4:32.38	+0.03
3rd place, bronze medalist(s)	8	Sergey Chudinov	Russia	1:08.12 (3)	1:08.30 (3)	1:09.54 (15)	1:08.66 (4)	4:34.62	+2.27
4	32	Eric Neilson	Canada	1:08.84 (10)	1:08.67 (6)	1:08.87 (4)	1:08.63 (3)	4:35.01	+2.66
5	27	Frank Rommel	Germany	1:08.61 (6)	1:08.63 (5)	1:09.05 (5)	1:08.90 (7)	4:35.19	+2.84
5	28	John Daly	United States	1:08.64 (7)	1:08.68 (7)	1:09.06 (6)	1:08.81 (6)	4:35.19	+2.84
7	29	Jon Montgomery	Canada	1:08.60 (5)	1:08.76 (8)	1:09.20 (9)	1:08.91 (8)	4:35.47	+3.12
8	31	Tomass Dukurs	Latvia	1:08.64 (7)	1:08.39 (4)	1:09.27 (10)	1:09.35 (15)	4:35.65	+3.30
9	11	Dominic Edward Parsons	Great Britain	1:09.03 (13)	1:09.06 (12)	1:08.70 (2)	1:08.98 (9)	4:35.77	+3.42
10	10	Kristan Bromley	Great Britain	1:08.58 (4)	1:08.91 (10)	1:09.28 (11)	1:09.19 (11)	4:35.96	+3.61
11	22	Ben Sandford	New Zealand	1:08.87 (11)	1:09.32 (15)	1:09.18 (8)	1:08.78 (5)	4:36.15	+3.80
12	24	Matthew Antoine	United States	1:08.87 (11)	1:08.93 (11)	1:09.37 (12)	1:09.36 (17)	4:36.53	+4.18
13	21	Raphael Maier	Austria	1:09.04 (14)	1:08.83 (9)	1:09.40 (13)	1:09.34 (14)	4:36.61	+4.26
14	33	Alexander Kröckel	Germany	1:09.12 (16)	1:09.50 (19)	1:09.14 (7)	1:09.05 (10)	4:36.81	+4.46
15	3	Ed Smith	Great Britain	1:09.08 (15)	1:09.23 (14)	1:09.43 (14)	1:09.33 (13)	4:37.07	+4.72
16	26	Christopher Grotheer	Germany	1:08.79 (9)	1:09.38 (16)	1:09.69 (19)	1:09.25 (12)	4:37.11	+4.76
17	17	Lukas Kummer	Switzerland	1:09.19 (18)	1:09.15 (13)	1:09.56 (16)	1:09.35 (15)	4:37.25	+4.90
18	23	Alexander Gassner	Germany	1:09.14 (17)	1:09.70 (25)	1:09.57 (17)	1:09.55 (18)	4:37.96	+5.61
19	12	Anton Batuev	Russia	1:09.56 (25)	1:09.61 (22)	1:09.58 (18)	1:09.93 (19)	4:38.68	+6.33
20	19	Yuki Sasahara	Japan	1:09.37 (19)	1:09.73 (26)	1:09.76 (20)	1:09.93 (19)	4:38.79	+6.44
21	25	John Fairbairn	Canada	1:09.50 (24)	1:09.47 (17)	1:10.01 (23)		3:28.98	
22	6	Ander Mirambell	Spain	1:09.47 (21)	1:09.64 (23)	1:10.06 (25)		3:29.17	
23	20	Matthias Guggenberger	Austria	1:09.66 (28)	1:09.55 (21)	1:09.97 (22)		3:29.18	
24	15	Anže Šetina	Slovenia	1:09.47 (21)	1:09.86 (27)	1:09.90 (21)		3:29.23	
25	9	Hiroatsu Takahashi	Japan	1:09.39 (20)	1:09.65 (24)	1:10.34 (27)		3:29.38	
26	14	Alexandros Kefalas	Greece	1:09.56 (25)	1:09.91 (28)	1:10.14 (26)		3:29.61	
27	13	John Farrow	Australia	1:09.61 (27)	1:09.48 (18)	1:10.60 (28)		3:29.69	
28	18	Michael Höfer	Switzerland	1:09.47 (21)	1:10.21 (30)	1:10.04 (24)		3:29.72	
29	7	Giovanni Mulassano	Italy	1:09.80 (30)	1:09.54 (20)	1:10.75 (29)		3:30.09	
30	4	Dorin Dumitru Velicu	Romania	1:09.74 (29)	1:10.36 (31)	1:10.97 (31)		3:31.07	
31	16	Sean Greenwood	Ireland	1:10.07 (31)	1:10.44 (32)	1:10.75 (29)		3:31.26	
32	2	Marco Zoccolan	Italy	1:10.82 (32)	1:10.14 (29)	1:12.30 (32)		3:33.26	
33	1	Lee Webster	South Africa	1:11.66 (33)	1:11.85 (33)	1:12.64 (33)		3:36.15	

=== Women ===
Rank	Bib	Athlete	Country	Run 1	Run 2	Run 3	Run 4	Total	Behind
1st place, gold medalist(s)	22	Shelley Rudman	Great Britain	1:09.54 (1)	1:09.49 (1)	1:09.63 (2)	1:09.94 (3)	4:38.60	
2nd place, silver medalist(s)	24	Noelle Pikus-Pace	United States	1:09.99 (2)	1:10.04 (5)	1:09.45 (1)	1:09.69 (1)	4:39.17	+0.57
3rd place, bronze medalist(s)	27	Sarah Reid	Canada	1:10.64 (8)	1:09.86 (2)	1:09.70 (3)	1:09.81 (2)	4:40.01	+1.41
4	26	Elizabeth Yarnold	Great Britain	1:10.15 (3)	1:10.03 (3)	1:09.92 (4)	1:10.04 (5)	4:40.14	+1.54
5	23	Mellisa Hollingsworth	Canada	1:10.33 (5)	1:10.11 (6)	1:09.94 (7)	1:09.98 (4)	4:40.36	+1.76
6	20	Michelle Steele	Australia	1:10.37 (6)	1:10.03 (3)	1:09.92 (4)	1:10.17 (8)	4:40.49	+1.89
7	25	Katie Uhlaender	United States	1:10.32 (4)	1:10.26 (7)	1:09.93 (6)	1:10.05 (6)	4:40.56	+1.96
8	29	Marion Thees	Germany	1:10.64 (8)	1:10.50 (10)	1:10.39 (11)	1:10.46 (11)	4:41.99	+3.39
9	14	Olga Potylitsina	Russia	1:10.75 (11)	1:10.46 (9)	1:10.51 (13)	1:10.42 (10)	4:42.14	+3.54
10	12	Katharine Eustace	New Zealand	1:10.74 (10)	1:10.29 (8)	1:10.36 (8)	1:10.78 (15)	4:42.17	+3.57
11	11	Svetlana Vasilyeva	Russia	1:11.08 (13)	1:10.69 (12)	1:10.37 (9)	1:10.29 (9)	4:42.43	+3.83
12	21	Cassie Hawrysh	Canada	1:10.78 (12)	1:10.75 (14)	1:10.56 (15)	1:10.50 (13)	4:42.59	+3.99
13	17	Maria Orlova	Russia	1:10.59 (7)	1:11.19 (21)	1:10.37 (9)	1:10.96 (20)	4:43.11	+4.51
14	19	Lucy Chaffer	Australia	1:11.55 (18)	1:10.73 (13)	1:10.65 (16)	1:10.47 (12)	4:43.40	+4.80
15	7	Marina Gilardoni	Switzerland	1:11.24 (16)	1:11.02 (17)	1:10.48 (12)	1:10.67 (14)	4:43.41	+4.81
16	15	Elena Nikitina	Russia	1:11.50 (17)	1:10.67 (11)	1:10.52 (14)	1:10.81 (17)	4:43.50	+4.90
17	28	Anja Huber	Germany	1:12.20 (24)	1:10.78 (15)	1:10.69 (17)	1:10.12 (7)	4:43.79	+5.19
18	18	Janine Flock	Austria	1:11.23 (15)	1:11.15 (19)	1:10.88 (18)	1:10.84 (18)	4:44.10	+5.50
19	13	Katharina Heinz	Germany	1:11.22 (14)	1:11.16 (20)	1:10.99 (21)	1:10.95 (19)	4:44.32	+5.72
20	9	Maria Marinela Mazilu	Romania	1:11.89 (21)	1:10.98 (16)	1:10.95 (20)	1:10.80 (16)	4:44.62	+6.02
21	16	Donna Creighton	Great Britain	1:11.65 (20)	1:11.31 (22)	1:10.94 (19)		3:33.90	
22	10	Joska Le Conté	Netherlands	1:11.92 (22)	1:11.03 (18)	1:11.41 (24)		3:34.36	
23	6	Nozomi Komuro	Japan	1:11.61 (19)	1:11.91 (26)	1:11.60 (25)		3:35.12	
24	8	Lelde Priedulena	Latvia	1:11.99 (23)	1:11.45 (23)	1:11.85 (27)		3:35.29	
25	2	Giulia Carpin	Italy	1:13.11 (27)	1:11.54 (24)	1:11.36 (23)		3:36.01	
26	4	Michaela Glässer	Czech Republic	1:12.69 (26)	1:12.00 (27)	1:11.35 (22)		3:36.04	
27	5	Barbara Hosch	Switzerland	1:12.68 (25)	1:12.15 (29)	1:11.69 (26)		3:36.52	
28	3	Maria Montejano	Spain	1:13.18 (28)	1:12.09 (28)	1:12.18 (28)		3:37.45	
29	1	Sara Lacrencic	Slovenia	1:13.44 (29)	1:11.85 (25)	1:12.69 (29)		3:37.98	

== Mixed team ==
The mixed team event – consisting of one run each of men's skeleton, women's skeleton, 2-man bobsleigh, and 2-women bobsleigh – debuted at the 2007 championships. The United States won its second consecutive mixed team championship.

Rank	Bib	!Athlete	Country	Run 1	Run 2	Run 3	Run 4	Total	Behind
1st place, gold medalist(s)	4	John Daly; Elana Meyers / Lolo Jones; Noelle Pikus-Pace; Steven Holcomb / Curtis Tomasevicz	United States I	1:08.61 (7)	1:07.76 (3)	1:08.92 (1)	1:06.00 (3)	4:31.29	
2nd place, silver medalist(s)	9	Frank Rommel; Sandra Kiriasis / Sarah Noll; Marion Thees; Francesco Friedrich / Gino Gerhardi	Germany I	1:07.76 (1)	1:07.53 (1)	1:10.62 (9)	1:05.62 (1)	4:31.53	+0.24
3rd place, bronze medalist(s)	7	Eric Neilson; Kaillie Humphries / Chelsea Valois; Sarah Reid; Lyndon Rush / Cody Sorensen	Canada I	1:08.55 (5)	1:07.67 (2)	1:09.90 (4)	1:06.18 (5)	4:32.30	+1.01
4	12	Alexander Kröckel; Cathleen Martini / Janine Tischer; Anja Huber; Maximilian Arndt / Thorsten Margis	Germany II	1:08.33 (3)	1:07.85 (4)	1:09.88 (3)	1:06.34 (8)	4:32.40	+1.11
5	6	Lukas Kummer; Fabienne Meyer / Elisabeth Graf; Marina Gilardoni; Beat Hefti / Abraham Morlu	Switzerland I	1:08.64 (8)	1:08.27 (7)	1:10.46 (8)	1:05.74 (2)	4:33.11	+1.82
6	3	Jon Montgomery; Jennifer Ciochetti / Emily Baadsvik; Mellisa Hollingsworth; Justin Kripps / Luke Demetre	Canada II	1:08.48 (4)	1:08.82 (11)	1:09.90 (4)	1:06.29 (7)	4:33.49	+2.20
7	1	Kristan Bromley; Paula Walker / Gillian Cooke; Elizabeth Yarnold; John James Jackson / Craig Pickering	Great Britain I	1:08.60 (6)	1:08.42 (9)	1:09.76 (2)	1:06.97 (10)	4:33.75	+2.46
8	5	Matthew Antoine; Jazmine Fenlator / Aja Evans; Katie Uhlaender; Cory Butner / Dallas Robinson	United States II	1:09.22 (10)	1:08.28 (8)	1:10.22 (6)	1:06.18 (5)	4:33.90	+2.61
9	10	Anton Batuev; Olga Stulneva / Nadezhda Sergeeva; Svetlana Vasilyeva; Alexey Stulnev / Kirill Antukh	Russia I	1:09.13 (9)	1:08.07 (6)	1:10.40 (7)	1:06.91 (9)	4:34.51	+3.22
10	11	Michael Höfer; Caroline Spahni / Ariane Walser; Barbara Hosch; Rico Peter / Patrick Bloechliger	Switzerland II	1:09.38 (11)	1:08.51 (10)	1:11.63 (12)	1:06.10 (4)	4:35.62	+4.33
11	8	Raphael Maier; Christina Hengster / Inga Versen; Janine Flock; Benjamin Maier / Sebastian Heufler	Austria I	1:09.39 (12)	1:07.98 (5)	1:10.88 (11)	1:07.48 (11)	4:35.73	+4.44
12	13	Dorin Dumitru Velicu; Maria Constantinn / Andreea Grecu; Maria Marinela Mazilu; Dorin-Alexandru Grigore / Danut Stancu	Romania I	1:10.60 (13)	1:10.65 (12)	1:10.84 (10)	1:07.58 (12)	4:39.67	+8.38
	2	Dominic Parsons; Victoria Olaoye / Kelly Denyer; Donna Creighton; Lamin Deen / Jim Galvin	Great Britain II	1:08.28 (2)	DNS				

== Medal table ==
Rank	Nation	Gold	Silver	Bronze	Total
1	Germany (GER)	2	1	2	5
2	United States (USA)	1	2	1	4
3	Russia (RUS)	1	1	1	3
4	Canada (CAN)	1	0	2	3
5	Great Britain (GBR)	1	0	0	1
6	Latvia (LAT)	0	1	0	1
6	Switzerland (SUI)	0	1	0	1
Totals (7 entries)		6	6	6	18
