= FIBT World Championships 2012 =

Bobsleigh and skeleton competition

2012 World Championships
- Location: Lake Placid, New York
- Dates: February 13-26

The FIBT World Championships 2012 took place from 13 to 26 February 2012 at the bobsleigh, luge, and skeleton track in Lake Placid, New York, for the tenth time. Lake Placid had previously hosted the World Championships in 1949, 1961, 1969, 1973, 1978, 1983, 1997 (skeleton), 2003 (men's bobsleigh), and 2009.

Lake Placid was awarded the 2013 championships at the 2009 FIBT Annual Congress meeting in Moscow on 31 May 2009, but the 2013 location was switched to St. Moritz, Switzerland, in December 2010. The FIBT switched the locations to accommodate a shorter trip for athletes and equipment to Sochi, Russia, in 2013 so that athletes will gain practice time on the 2014 Olympic track in Sochi.

== Bobsleigh ==
=== Two-man ===
Rank	Athlete	Country	Run 1	Run 2	Run 3	Run 4	Total	Behind
1st place, gold medalist(s)	Steve Holcomb; Steven Langton	United States	55.96	55.75	55.54	55.63	3:42.88	
2nd place, silver medalist(s)	Lyndon Rush; Jesse Lumsden	Canada	55.71	55.88	55.86	55.89	3:43.34	+0.46
3rd place, bronze medalist(s)	Maximilian Arndt; Kevin Kuske	Germany	55.78	56.02	55.71	55.92	3:43.43	+0.55
4	Francesco Friedrich; Marko Huebenbecker	Germany	56.12	56.03	55.74	55.61	3:43.50	+0.62
5	Beat Hefti; Thomas Lamparter	Switzerland	55.94	55.96	55.90	55.94	3:43.74	+0.86
6	John Napier; Christopher Fogt	United States	56.04	56.10	56.05	55.93	3:44.12	+1.24
7	Manuel Machata; Andreas Bredau	Germany	55.98	56.09	56.17	56.04	3:44.28	+1.40
8	Oskars Melbārdis; Daumants Dreiškens	Latvia	55.96	56.05	56.16	56.17	3:44.34	+1.46
9	Nick Cunningham; Dallas Robinson	United States	56.29	55.92	56.15	55.99	3:44.35	+1.47
10	Gregor Baumann; Alex Baumann	Switzerland	56.09	56.10	56.24	56.03	3:44.46	+1.58
11	Edwin van Calker; Sybren Jansma	Netherlands	56.29	56.29	56.00	55.91	3:44.49	+1.61
12	Nicolae Istrate; Florin Cezar Craciun	Romania	56.37	56.41	56.12	56.12	3:45.02	+2.14
13	Simone Bertazzo; Francesco Costa	Italy	56.55	56.34	56.51	55.81	3:45.21	+2.33
14	Patrice Servelle; Lascelles Brown	Monaco	56.35	56.28	56.72	56.19	3:45.54	+2.66
15	Edgars Maskalāns; Intars Dambis	Latvia	56.29	56.63	56.49	56.22	3:45.63	+2.75
16	Alexander Kasjanov; Maxim Belugin	Russia	56.60	56.76	56.61	56.36	3:46.33	+3.45
17	Justin Kripps; Derek Plug	Canada	57.03	56.53	56.75	56.11	3:46.42	+3.54
18	Jan Vrba; Jan Stokláska	Czech Republic	56.64	56.68	56.95	56.48	3:46.75	+3.87
19	Nikita Zakharov; Maksim Meleshkin	Russia	56.73	56.83	56.87	56.54	3:46.97	+4.09
20	Heath Spence; Duncan Harvey	Australia	57.02	57.03	57.27			
21	Milan Jagnešák; Juraj Mokrás	Slovakia	57.42	57.48	57.28			
22	Ugis Zalims; Raivis Broks	Latvia	57.51	57.46	57.45			
23	Thibault Alexis Godefroy; Alexandre Jolivet	France	57.54	57.35	57.60			
24	Michael Klingler; Jonas Gantenbein	Liechtenstein	57.93	57.48	57.88			
25	Vuk Rađenović; Damjan Zlatnar	Serbia	57.98	57.54	58.38			
26	Kim Dong-Hyun; Seo Young-Woo	South Korea	57.85	58.42	57.98			
	Ivo de Bruin; Bror van der Zijde	Netherlands	DSQ					
	Alexandr Zubkov; Dmitry Trunenkov	Russia	DSQ					
	John James Jackson; Bruce Tasker	United Kingdom	56.70	56.54	56.39	DNF		

=== Four-man ===
Rank	Athlete	Country	Run 1	Run 2	Run 3	Run 4	Total	Behind
1st place, gold medalist(s)	Steve Holcomb; Justin Olsen; Steven Langton; Curtis Tomasevicz	United States	54.34	54.58	53.92	53.99	3:36.83	
2nd place, silver medalist(s)	Maximilian Arndt; Alexander Rödiger; Kevin Kuske; Martin Putze	Germany	54.19	54.74	54.12	54.28	3:37.33	+0.50
3rd place, bronze medalist(s)	Manuel Machata; Marko Huebenbecker; Andreas Bredau; Christian Poser	Germany	54.38	54.82	54.25	54.18	3:37.63	+0.80
4	Edwin van Calker; Arno Klaassen; Sybren Jansma; Jeroen Piek	Netherlands	54.60	54.95	54.23	54.16	3:37.94	+1.11
5	Alexandr Zubkov; Filipp Yegorov; Dmitry Trunenkov; Maxim Mokrousov	Russia	54.38	54.97	54.27	54.49	3:38.11	+1.28
6	Edgars Maskalāns; Daumants Dreiškens; Ugis Zalims; Intars Dambis	Latvia	54.69	54.93	54.21	54.37	3:38.20	+1.37
7	Lyndon Rush; Jesse Lumsden; Cody Sorensen; Neville Wright	Canada	54.88	54.75	54.21	54.48	3:38.32	+1.49
8	Gregor Baumann; Patrick Bloechliger; Alex Baumann; Juerg Egger	Switzerland	54.87	55.21	54.43	54.58	3:39.09	+2.26
9	Francesco Friedrich; Ronny Listner; Michail Makarow; Thomas Blaschek	Germany	54.84	55.08	54.42	54.97	3:39.31	+2.48
10	John James Jackson; Stuart Benson; Bruce Tasker; Joel Fearon	United Kingdom	55.25	55.09	54.62	54.49	3:39.45	+2.62
11	Alexander Kasjanov; Petr Moiseev; Maxim Belugin; Nikolay Hrenkov	Russia	54.89	55.29	54.58	54.73	3:39.49	+2.66
11	Nikita Zakharov; Alexey Negodaylo; Ilvir Huzin; Yury Selikhov	Russia	55.07	55.06	54.79	54.57	3:39.49	+2.66
13	Jan Vrba; Vladimir Hladik; Martin Bohmann; Jan Stokláska	Czech Republic	55.11	55.19	54.64	54.74	3:39.68	+2.85
13	Nick Cunningham; Jesse Beckom; Johnny Quinn; Dallas Robinson	United States	55.21	55.35	54.53	54.59	3:39.68	+2.85
15	Simone Bertazzo; Simone Fontana; Gianluca Bruno; Francesco Costa	Italy	55.38	55.38	54.88	54.95	3:40.59	+3.76
16	Nicolae Istrate; Emilian Pertea; Bogdan Laurentiu Otava; Florin Cezar Craciun	Romania	55.27	55.47	55.03	55.14	3:40.91	+4.08
17	Won Yun-jong; Kim Sik; Kim Hong Bae; Seo Young-woo	South Korea	55.82	55.69	55.45	55.31	3:42.27	+5.44
	Milan Jagnešák; Martin Tešovič; Robert Chorvat; Juraj Mokrás	Slovakia	55.61	55.38	54.98	DSQ		
	Heath Spence; Gareth Nichols; Ben Lisson; Lucas Mata	Australia	55.85	55.70	DNF			
	Oskars Melbārdis; Helvijs Lusis; Arvis Vilkaste; Janis Strenga	Latvia	54.61	56.29	DNS			
	John Napier; Charles Berkeley; Adam Clark; Christopher Fogt	United States	54.75	DSQ				
	Thibault Alexis Godefroy; Jeremy Baillard; Alexandre Jolivet; Vincent Daniel Ricard	France	DNS					

=== Two-woman ===
Rank	Bib	Athlete	Country	Run 1	Run 2	Run 3	Run 4	Total	Behind
1st place, gold medalist(s)	5	Kaillie Humphries; Jennifer Ciochetti	Canada	57.10	57.07	57.22	57.18	3:48.57	
2nd place, silver medalist(s)	4	Sandra Kiriasis; Petra Lammert	Germany	57.30	57.28	57.21	57.11	3:48.90	+0.33
3rd place, bronze medalist(s)	8	Elana Meyers; Katie Eberling	United States	57.22	57.45	57.41	57.49	3:49.57	+1.00
4	1	Cathleen Martini; Janine Tischer	Germany	57.37	57.53	57.45	57.47	3:49.95	+1.25
5	17	Helen Upperton; Shelley-Ann Brown	Canada	57.58	57.35	57.57	57.45	3:49.95	+1.38
6	3	Fabienne Meyer; Hanne Schenk	Switzerland	57.44	57.59	57.56	57.67	3:50.26	+1.69
7	11	Paula Walker; Gillian Cooke	Great Britain	57.54	57.65	57.64	57.77	3:50.60	+2.03
8	2	Anja Schneiderheinze; Lisette Thöne	Germany	57.74	57.51	57.90	57.75	3:50.87	+2.30
9	7	Christina Hengster; Inga Versen	Austria	57.77	57.79	57.90	57.68	3:51.14	+2.57
10	13	Jazmine Fenlator; Ingrid Marcum	United States	57.81	57.52	57.90	58.05	3:51.28	+2.71
11	9	Olga Fyodorova; Margarita Ismailova	Russia	57.83	57.79	58.08	57.93	3:51.57	+3.00
12	10	Bree Schaaf; Emily Azevedo	United States	57.95	57.69	58.04	58.12	3:51.84	+3.27
13	6	Anastasia Tambovtseva; Liudmila Udobkina	Russia	57.87	57.82	58.04	58.19	3:51.92	+3.35
14	14	Viktoria Tokovaya; Aleksandra Pahmutova	Russia	58.59	58.17	58.24	58.28	3:53.28	+4.71
15	12	Astrid Radjenovic; Ebony Gorincu	Australia	58.64	58.54	58.55	58.64	3:54.37	+5.80
16	15	Elfje Willemsen; Wendy Van Leuven	Belgium	58.60	58.31	58.54	59.05	3:54.50	+5.93
17	16	Eva Willemarck; An Vannieuwenhuyse	Belgium	59.41	59.22	59.63	59.38	3:57.64	+9.07

== Skeleton ==
=== Men ===
Rank	Athlete	Country	Run 1	Run 2	Run 3	Run 4	Total	Behind
1st place, gold medalist(s)	Martins Dukurs	Latvia	53.77	54.37	54.34	54.61	3:37.09	
2nd place, silver medalist(s)	Frank Rommel	Germany	54.00	54.83	55.21	55.13	3:39.17	+2.08
3rd place, bronze medalist(s)	Ben Sandford	New Zealand	54.31	55.20	54.76	55.23	3:39.50	+2.41
4	Sergey Chudinov	Russia	54.37	55.20	55.01	55.07	3:39.65	+2.56
5	Tomass Dukurs	Latvia	54.13	55.31	55.19	55.12	3:39.75	+2.66
5	Matthew Antoine	United States	54.28	55.04	55.00	55.43	3:39.75	+2.66
7	Alexander Gassner	Germany	54.70	55.23	55.25	55.17	3:40.35	+3.26
8	John Daly	United States	54.66	55.24	54.89	55.73	3:40.52	+3.43
9	Alexander Kröckel	Germany	54.60	55.22	55.54	55.18	3:40.54	+3.45
10	John Fairbairn	Canada	54.45	55.36	55.39	55.51	3:40.71	+3.62
11	Michael Douglas	Canada	54.78	55.31	55.43	55.41	3:40.93	+3.84
12	Aleksandr Tretyakov	Russia	55.29	55.40	55.04	55.62	3:41.35	+4.26
13	Eric Neilson	Canada	54.95	55.51	55.97	55.03	3:41.46	+4.37
14	Kristan Bromley	United Kingdom	54.44	55.66	55.51	55.94	3:41.55	+4.46
14	Ed Smith	United Kingdom	54.96	55.40	55.50	55.69	3:41.55	+4.46
16	Anton Batuev	Russia	55.31	55.57	55.44	55.25	3:41.57	+4.48
17	Adam Pengilly	United Kingdom	54.45	55.85	55.47	55.88	3:41.65	+4.56
18	Matthias Guggenberger	Austria	54.86	55.57	55.87	56.02	3:42.32	+5.23
19	Maurizio Oioli	Italy	55.37	55.66	55.95	56.03	3:43.01	+5.92
20	Hiroatsu Takahashi	Japan	55.62	55.44	55.87	56.09	3:43.02	+5.93
21	Shinsuke Tayama	Japan	55.39	56.23	56.02			
22	Axel Jungk	Germany	55.83	56.42	55.91			
23	Lukas Kummer	Switzerland	55.66	56.19	56.37			
23	Michael Höfer	Switzerland	55.69	56.42	56.11			
25	Ander Mirambell	Spain	55.74	56.32	56.56			
26	Raphael Maier	Austria	55.59	56.83	56.32			
27	Silviu Alexandru Mesarosi	Romania	56.73	57.13	56.27			
28	Alexandros Kefalas	Greece	56.11	57.04	57.35			
29	Bradley Chalupski	Israel	56.57	58.20	57.18			
30	Urs Vescoli	Australia	57.19	57.78	57.77			
31	Kim Tae-Rae	South Korea	59.55	58.54	58.18			

=== Women ===
Rank	Athlete	Country	Run 1	Run 2	Run 3	Run 4	Total	Behind
1st place, gold medalist(s)	Katie Uhlaender	United States	55.54	55.49	55.62	55.68	3:42.33	
2nd place, silver medalist(s)	Mellisa Hollingsworth	Canada	55.64	55.57	55.61	55.68	3:42.50	+0.17
3rd place, bronze medalist(s)	Elizabeth Yarnold	United Kingdom	55.95	55.76	55.40	55.58	3:42.69	+0.36
4	Shelley Rudman	United Kingdom	55.48	56.00	55.58	56.07	3:43.13	+0.80
5	Amy Williams	United Kingdom	56.01	55.74	55.81	55.68	3:43.24	+0.91
6	Marion Thees	Germany	55.98	55.75	55.87	56.26	3:43.86	+1.53
7	Katharina Heinz	Germany	55.83	55.98	56.10	56.48	3:44.39	+2.06
8	Anja Huber	Germany	55.90	56.40	56.12	56.08	3:44.50	+2.17
9	Lucy Chaffer	Australia	55.98	55.96	56.05	56.58	3:44.57	+2.24
10	Anne O'Shea	United States	56.20	56.13	56.21	56.06	3:44.60	+2.27
11	Sarah Reid	Canada	56.23	56.14	56.07	56.43	3:44.87	+2.54
12	Amy Gough	Canada	56.15	56.18	56.48	56.15	3:44.96	+2.63
13	Katharine Eustace	New Zealand	56.12	56.09	56.24	56.55	3:45.00	+2.67
14	Svetlana Vasilyeva	Russia	56.46	56.12	56.44	56.04	3:45.06	+2.73
15	Nozomi Komuro	Japan	56.37	56.36	56.04	56.32	3:45.09	+2.76
16	Rose McGrandle	United Kingdom	56.41	56.50	56.25	56.21	3:45.37	+3.04
17	Emma Lincoln-Smith	Australia	56.11	56.14	56.75	56.79	3:45.79	+3.46
18	Janine Flock	Austria	56.30	56.41	57.01	56.87	3:46.59	+4.26
19	Olga Potylitsina	Russia	56.38	57.12	56.55	56.84	3:46.89	+4.56
20	Marina Gilardoni	Switzerland	56.87	56.56	56.73	56.95	3:47.11	+4.78
21	Maria Orlova	Russia	56.57	56.93	56.96			
22	Joska Le Conté	Netherlands	57.44	57.02	56.70			
23	Barbara Hosch	Switzerland	57.38	57.15	57.03			
24	Maria Marinela Mazilu	Romania	58.00	57.29	57.01			
25	Michaela Glässer	Czech Republic	57.63	57.17	57.72			
26	Rindy Loucks	Jamaica	58.70	58.64	58.64			
	Katie Tannenbaum	United States Virgin Islands	59.26	DNF				

== Mixed team ==
The mixed team event – consisting of one run each of men's skeleton, women's skeleton, 2-man bobsleigh, and 2-women bobsleigh – debuted at the 2007 championships. The United States won its first mixed team championship, halting Germany's streak of four consecutive championships since the event was introduced.

Rank	Athlete	Country	Run 1	Run 2	Run 3	Run 4	Total	Behind
1st place, gold medalist(s)	Matthew Antoine; Elana Meyers / Emily Azevedo; Katie Uhlaender; Steve Holcomb / Justin Olsen	United States	54.78	57.71	56.29	56.20	3:44.98	
2nd place, silver medalist(s)	Frank Rommel; Sandra Kiriasis / Berit Wiacker; Marion Thees; Maximilian Arndt / Steven Deja	Germany	54.76	57.78	56.58	56.59	3:45.71	+0.73
3rd place, bronze medalist(s)	John Fairbairn; Kaillie Humphries / Emily Baadsvik; Mellisa Hollingsworth; Justin Kripps / Timothy Randall	Canada	55.25	57.65	56.57	56.81	3:46.28	+1.30
4	John Daly; Jazmine Fenlator / Ingrid Marcum; Anne O'Shea; Nick Cunningham / Dallas Robinson	United States	54.83	58.30	57.01	56.34	3:46.48	+1.50
5	Alexander Kröckel; Cathleen Martini / Christin Senkel; Anja Huber; Manuel Machata / Michail Makarow	Germany	54.83	57.97	57.30	56.71	3:46.81	+1.83
6	Sergey Chudinov; Anastasia Tambovtseva / Natalya Kalashnik; Maria Orlova; Alexander Kasjanov / Yury Selikhov	Russia	55.16	58.43	56.87	56.97	3:47.43	+2.45
7	Kristan Bromley; Paula Walker / Rebekah Wilson; Shelley Rudman; John James Jackson / Stuart Benson	United Kingdom	55.13	58.59	56.99	56.85	3:47.56	+2.58
8	Aleksandr Tretyakov; Olga Fyodorova / Yulia Timofeeva; Olga Potylitsina; Alexandr Zubkov / Maxim Mokrousov	Russia	55.06	58.67	57.44	56.50	3:47.67	+2.69
	Eric Neilson; Helen Upperton / Marquise Brisebois; Amy Gough; Lyndon Rush / Timothy Randall	Canada	DNS					

== Medal table ==
Rank	Nation	Gold	Silver	Bronze	Total
1	United States (USA)	4	0	1	5
2	Canada (CAN)	1	2	1	4
3	Latvia (LAT)	1	0	0	1
4	Germany (GER)	0	4	2	6
5	Great Britain (GBR)	0	0	1	1
5	New Zealand (NZL)	0	0	1	1
Totals (6 entries)		6	6	6	18
