= 2017–18 Bobsleigh World Cup =

International bobsleigh competition

Winners
- Two-man: (Canada) Justin Kripps
- Four-man: (Germany) Johannes Lochner
- Combined men's: (Canada) Justin Kripps
- Two-woman: (Canada) Kaillie Humphries

Competitions
- Venues: 8 (8 events)

The 2017–18 Bobsleigh World Cup was a multi-race series over a season for bobsleigh. The season started on 9 November 2017 in Lake Placid, USA and ended on 21 January 2018 in Königssee, Germany. The World Cup is organised by the IBSF (formerly the FIBT) who also run World Cups and Championships in skeleton. The season was sponsored by BMW.

== Calendar ==
Below is the schedule of the 2017/18 season.

Venue	Date	Details
(United States) Lake Placid	9–10 November 2017	No Four-man race. Double race for two-man.
(United States) Park City	17–18 November 2017	No Two-man race. Double race for four-man.
(Canada) Whistler	24–25 November 2017	
(Germany) Winterberg	8–10 December 2017	
(Austria) Igls	15–17 December 2017	also European Championship
(Germany) Altenberg	5–7 January 2018	
(Switzerland) St. Moritz	12-14 January 2018	
(Germany) Königssee	19–21 January 2018	

== Results ==
=== Two-man ===
Event:	Gold:	Time	Silver:	Time	Bronze:	Time
(United States) Lake Placid 1	Nico Walther; Christian Poser; Germany	1:51.92 (55.71 / 56.21)	Nick Cunningham; Ryan Bailey; United States	1:52.03 (55.80 / 56.23)	Codie Bascue; Carlo Valdes; United States	1:52.07 (55.88 / 56.19)
(United States) Lake Placid 2	Codie Bascue; Samuel McGuffie; United States	1:51.73 (55.74 / 55.99)	Justin Kripps; Alexander Kopacz; Canada	1:51.84 (55.79 / 56.05)	Justin Olsen; Evan Weinstock; United States	1:52.13 (55.96 / 56.17)
(Canada) Whistler	Chris Spring; Neville Wright; Canada	1:44.17 (51.84 / 52.33)	Justin Kripps; Alexander Kopacz; Canada	1:44.19 (52.02 / 52.17)	Oskars Melbārdis; Daumants Dreiškens; Latvia	1:44.26 (52.00 / 52.26)
(Germany) Winterberg	Clemens Bracher; Michael Kuonen; Switzerland	1:51.64 (55.87 / 55.77)	Chris Spring; Neville Wright; Canada	1:51.76 (55.92 / 55.84)		
(Germany) Winterberg	Clemens Bracher; Michael Kuonen; Switzerland	1:51.64 (55.87 / 55.77)	Francesco Friedrich; Thorsten Margis; Germany	1:51.76 (55.96 / 55.80)		
(Austria) Igls	Francesco Friedrich; Thorsten Margis; Germany	1:43.71 (51.89 / 51.82)	Justin Kripps; Jesse Lumsden; Canada	1:43.98 (52.00 / 51.98)	Clemens Bracher; Michael Kuonen; Switzerland	1:44.11 (52.09 / 52.02)
(Germany) Altenberg	Justin Kripps; Alexander Kopacz; Canada	1:49.21 (54.49 / 54.72)	Francesco Friedrich; Martin Grothkopp; Germany	1:49.30 (54.55 / 54.75)	Oskars Ķibermanis; Matīss Miknis; Latvia	1:49.72 (54.79 / 54.93)
(Switzerland) St. Moritz	Nico Walther; Christian Poser; Germany	2:10.72 (1:05.62 / 1:05.10)	Francesco Friedrich; Thorsten Margis; Germany	2:10.77 (1:05.58 / 1:05.19)	Johannes Lochner; Christopher Weber; Germany	2:10.93 (1:05.66 / 1:05.27)
(Germany) Königssee	Francesco Friedrich; Thorsten Margis; Germany	1:38.97 (49.57 / 49.40)	Johannes Lochner; Christopher Weber; Germany	1:39.37 (49.69 / 49.68)	Justin Kripps; Alexander Kopacz; Canada	1:39.41 (49.85 / 49.56)

=== Four-man ===
Event:	Gold:	Time	Silver:	Time	Bronze:	Time
(United States) Park City 1	Nico Walther; Kevin Kuske; Christian Poser; Eric Franke; Germany	1:36.80 (48.37 / 48.43)	Justin Kripps; Lascelles Brown; Ben Coakwell; Neville Wright; Canada	1:36.83 (48.54 / 48.29)	Chris Spring; Jesse Lumsden; Alexander Kopacz; Oluseyi Smith; Canada	1:36.86 (48.43 / 48.43)
(United States) Park City 2	Johannes Lochner; Marc Rademacher; Christopher Weber; Christian Rasp; Germany	1:35.44 (47.60 / 47.84)	Codie Bascue; Nathan Weber; Carlo Valdes; Sam McGuffie; United States	1:35.49 (47.54 / 47.95)	Bradley Hall; Bruce Tasker; Joel Fearon; Greg Cackett; Great Britain	1:35.56 (47.37 / 48.19)
(Canada) Whistler	Alexander Kasjanov; Ilvir Huzin; Vasiliy Kondratenko; Aleksei Pushkarev; Russia	1:41.89 (50.68 / 51.21)	Lamin Deen; Ben Simons; Toby Olubi; Andrew Matthews; Great Britain	1:42.17 (50.66 / 51.51)	Nico Walther; Kevin Kuske; Kevin Korona; Eric Franke; Germany	1:42.37 (50.81 / 51.56)
(Germany) Winterberg	Johannes Lochner; Joshua Bluhm; Christopher Weber; Christian Rasp; Germany	1:49.03 (54.36 / 54.67)	Nico Walther; Marko Hübenbecker; Kevin Korona; Eric Franke; Germany	1:49.26 (54.48 / 54.78)	Francesco Friedrich; Jannis Bäcker; Martin Grothkopp; Thorsten Margis; Germany	1:49.36 (54.51 / 54.85)
(Austria) Igls	Johannes Lochner; Marc Rademacher; Joshua Bluhm; Christian Rasp; Germany	1:42.45 (51.34 / 51.11)	Justin Kripps; Alexander Kopacz; Jesse Lumsden; Oluseyi Smith; Canada	1:42.60 (51.35 / 51.25)	Francesco Friedrich; Candy Bauer; Martin Grothkopp; Thorsten Margis; Germany	1:42.65 (51.26 / 51.39)
(Germany) Altenberg	Nico Walther; Kevin Kuske; Christian Poser; Eric Franke; Germany	1:48.79 (54.17 / 54.62)	Francesco Friedrich; Candy Bauer; Martin Grothkopp; Thorsten Margis; Germany	1:48.84 (54.33 / 54.51)	Oskars Ķibermanis; Jānis Jansons; Matīss Miknis; Intars Dambis; Latvia	1:49.03 (54.30 / 54.73)
(Switzerland) St. Moritz	Johannes Lochner; Sebastian Mrowka; Joshua Bluhm; Christian Rasp; Germany	2:08.42 (1:04.26 / 1:04.16)	Francesco Friedrich; Candy Bauer; Martin Grothkopp; Thorsten Margis; Germany	2:08.56 (1:04.41 / 1:04.15)	Chris Spring; Bryan Barnett; Lascelles Brown; Neville Wright; Canada	2:08.95 (1:04.54 / 1:04.41)
(Germany) Königssee	Nico Walther; Kevin Kuske; Alexander Rödiger; Eric Franke; Germany	1:37.21 (48.51 / 48.70)	Benjamin Maier; Kilian Walch; Markus Sammer; Dănuț Moldovan; Austria	1:37.57 (48.83 / 48.74)		
(Germany) Königssee	Nico Walther; Kevin Kuske; Alexander Rödiger; Eric Franke; Germany	1:37.21 (48.51 / 48.70)	Oskars Melbārdis; Daumants Dreiškens; Arvis Vilkaste; Jānis Strenga; Latvia	1:37.57 (48.84 / 48.73)		

=== Two-woman ===
Event:	Gold:	Time	Silver:	Time	Bronze:	Time
(United States) Lake Placid	Kaillie Humphries; Melissa Lotholz; Canada	1:54.40 (56.96 / 57.44)	Elana Meyers Taylor; Lauren Gibbs; United States	1:54.43 (57.07 / 57.36)	Stephanie Schneider; Lisa Buckwitz; Germany	1:54.60 (57.10 / 57.50)
(United States) Park City	Jamie Greubel Poser; Lauren Gibbs; United States	1:40.72 (50.32 / 50.40)	Kaillie Humphries; Melissa Lotholz; Canada	1:40.82 (50.42 / 50.40)	Elana Meyers Taylor; Lolo Jones; United States	1:40.99 (50.49 / 50.50)
(Canada) Whistler	Kaillie Humphries; Melissa Lotholz; Canada	1:46.67 (53.15 / 53.52)	Jamie Greubel Poser; Aja Evans; United States	1:47.15 (53.30 / 53.85)	Elana Meyers Taylor; Kehri Jones; United States	1:47.50 (53.52 / 53.98)
(Germany) Winterberg	Stephanie Schneider; Lisa Buckwitz; Germany	1:54.90 (57.61 / 57.29)	Elana Meyers Taylor; Lauren Gibbs; United States	1:55.16 (57.88 / 57.28)	Mariama Jamanka; Annika Drazek; Germany	1:55.18 (57.72 / 57.46)
(Austria) Igls	Stephanie Schneider; Annika Drazek; Germany	1:46.28 (53.18 / 53.10)	Elana Meyers Taylor; Kehri Jones; United States	1:46.64 (53.42 / 53.22)	Mariama Jamanka; Lisa Buckwitz; Germany	1:46.65 (53.47 / 53.18)
(Germany) Altenberg	Kaillie Humphries; Phylicia George; Canada	1:52.62 (56.22 / 56.40)	Jamie Greubel Poser; Aja Evans; United States	1:53.31 (56.66 / 56.65)	Anna Köhler; Annika Drazek; Germany	1:53.52 (56.75 / 56.77)
(Switzerland) St. Moritz	Elana Meyers Taylor; Lolo Jones; United States	2:15.27 (1:07.87 / 1:07.40)	Mariama Jamanka; Annika Drazek; Germany	2:15.48 (1:07.98 / 1:07.50)	Stephanie Schneider; Lisa Buckwitz; Germany	2:15.76 (1:08.20 / 1:07.56)
(Germany) Königssee	Stephanie Schneider; Annika Drazek; Germany	1:41.35 (50.78 / 50.57)	Kaillie Humphries; Phylicia George; Canada	1:41.64 (50.91 / 50.73)	Elana Meyers Taylor; Lauren Gibbs; United States	1:41.67 (50.83 / 50.84)

== Standings ==
=== Two-man ===
Pos.	Racer	(United States) LPL1	(United States) LPL2	(Canada) WHI	(Germany) WIN	(Austria) IGL	(Germany) ALT	(Switzerland) STM	(Germany) KON	Points
1	Justin Kripps (CAN)	4	2	2	4	2	1	4	3	1631
2	Francesco Friedrich (GER)	9	9	13	2	1	2	2	1	1504
3	Chris Spring (CAN)	7	5	1	2	6	12	7	17	1347
4	Oskars Ķibermanis (LAT)	8	8	10	8	8	3	6	6	1336
5	Nico Walther (GER)	1	9	7	9	11	DSQ	1	4	1250
6	Johannes Lochner (GER)	12	6	21	16	4	6	3	2	1240
7	Rico Peter (SUI)	5	7	5	14	16	8	8	14	1176
8	Oskars Melbārdis (LAT)	14	11	3	10	9	21	13	5	1130
9	Nick Poloniato (CAN)	13	12	7	5	DSQ	4	8	10	1096
10	Alexander Kasjanov (RUS)	11	18	4	6	15	7	16	21	1014
11	Benjamin Maier (AUT)	16	21	17	7	10	10	10	7	1014
12	Alexey Stulnev (RUS)	18	20	9	12	17	5	5	16	980
13	Codie Bascue (USA)	3	1	16	19	7	18	20	23	961
14	Uģis Žaļims (LAT)	17	15	19	11	24	12	11	8	871
15	Nick Cunningham (USA)	2	4	11	18	5	–	–	–	802
16	Justin Olsen (USA)	6	3	–	22	13	–	14	19	738
17	Clemens Bracher (SUI)	–	–	–	1	3	–	16	9	673
18	Maxim Andrianov (RUS)	21	17	15	17	21	11	24	21	647
19	Brad Hall (GBR)	19	DNF	13	24	19	14	18	14	617
20	Romain Heinrich (FRA)	–	–	–	23	14	16	15	13	482
21	Won Yun-jong (KOR)	10	13	6	–	–	–	–	–	440
22	Mateusz Luty (POL)	–	–	–	15	22	9	12	–	440
23	Markus Treichl (AUT)	–	–	–	21	17	17	19	12	440
24	Dominik Dvořák (CZE)	–	–	–	13	12	15	–	18	432
25	Ivo de Bruin (NED)	20	23	20	26	DSQ	–	22	11	414
26	Rudy Rinaldi (MON)	15	14	22	–	23	–	–	–	322
27	Simone Bertazzo (ITA)	22	24	25	27	–	20	23	–	291
28	Jan Vrba (CZE)	–	–	–	20	–	19	25	20	250
29	Loic Costerg (FRA)	25	22	12	–	–	–	–	–	224
30	Bruce Tasker (GBR)	26	25	27	25	20	–	–	–	216
31	Kim Dong-hyun (KOR)	24	19	18	–	–	–	–	–	199
32	Beat Hefti (SUI)	23	16	23	–	–	–	–	–	196
33	Patrick Baumgartner (ITA)	27	26	26	30	–	DNS	–	–	124
34	Lucas Mata (AUS)	–	–	–	–	–	–	21	–	62
35	Hunter Church (USA)	–	–	24	–	–	–	–	–	45
36	Vuk Rađenović (SRB)	–	–	–	28	–	–	–	–	28
37	Dorin Alexandru Grigore (ROU)	–	–	–	29	–	–	–	–	24
38	Lamin Deen (GBR)	–	–	–	–	–	DSQ	–	–	0

=== Four-man ===
Pos.	Racer	(United States) PAC1	(United States) PAC2	(Canada) WHI	(Germany) WIN	(Austria) IGL	(Germany) ALT	(Switzerland) STM	(Germany) KON	Points
1	Johannes Lochner (GER)	4	1	5	1	1	5	1	4	1652
2	Francesco Friedrich (GER)	9	4	12	3	3	2	2	6	1468
3	Nico Walther (GER)	1	9	3	2	5	1	DSQ	1	1421
4	Justin Kripps (CAN)	2	8	4	4	2	4	16	7	1420
5	Oskars Melbārdis (LAT)	4	7	14	12	4	7	9	2	1322
6	Chris Spring (CAN)	3	5	13	5	13	13	3	8	1288
7	Oskars Ķibermanis (LAT)	16	13	10	5	7	3	5	5	1280
8	Codie Bascue (USA)	7	2	8	11	11	9	6	12	1266
9	Alexander Kasjanov (RUS)	10	11	1	8	8	6	15	14	1217
10	Benjamin Maier (AUT)	15	14	15	5	9	12	4	2	1186
11	Lamin Deen (GBR)	8	6	2	9	16	10	19	19	1086
12	Brad Hall (GBR)	22	3	9	13	13	15	10	22	952
13	Rico Peter (SUI)	14	23	7	9	10	23	13	13	916
14	Alexey Stulnev (RUS)	12	19	16	21	6	19	12	10	882
15	Loic Costerg (FRA)	17	17	6	14	15	21	7	21	860
16	Nick Poloniato (CAN)	6	11	11	16	16	20	22	18	844
17	Maxim Andrianov (RUS)	21	21	20	18	12	8	14	15	776
18	Ivo de Bruin (NED)	19	18	17	25	21	–	17	16	528
19	Simone Bertazzo (ITA)	20	20	19	15	–	10	20	–	526
20	Justin Olsen (USA)	DSQ	15	–	23	19	–	11	9	516
21	Markus Treichl (AUT)	–	–	–	24	18	14	21	11	435
22	Nick Cunningham (USA)	12	16	–	20	23	–	–	–	342
23	Clemens Bracher (SUI)	–	–	–	17	22	–	18	17	312
24	Dominik Dvořák (CZE)	–	–	–	21	20	17	–	20	286
25	Won Yun-jong (KOR)	11	10	–	–	–	–	–	–	280
26	Patrick Baumgartner (ITA)	23	24	18	27	–	22	–	–	263
27	Mateusz Luty (POL)	–	–	–	19	24	18	23	–	249
28	Beat Hefti (SUI)	18	22	21	–	–	–	–	–	198
29	Jan Vrba (CZE)	–	–	–	26	–	16	24	DSQ	177
30	Rudy Rinaldi (MON)	–	–	–	–	DNS	–	8	–	160
31	Dorin Alexandru Grigore (ROU)	–	–	–	28	–	–	–	23	78
32	Hunter Church (USA)	–	–	22	–	–	–	–	–	56
33	Maria Constantin (ROU)	–	–	–	–	–	–	–	24	45
34	Lucas Mata (AUS)	–	–	–	–	–	–	25	–	40
35	Elana Meyers (USA)	–	–	–	–	25	–	–	–	40
36	Vuk Rađenović (SRB)	–	–	–	29	–	–	–	–	24

=== Two-woman ===
Pos.	Racer	(United States) LPL	(United States) PAC	(Canada) WHI	(Germany) WIN	(Austria) IGL	(Germany) ALT	(Switzerland) STM	(Germany) KON	Points
1	Kaillie Humphries (CAN)	1	2	1	4	4	1	9	2	1631
2	Elana Meyers Taylor (USA)	2	3	3	2	2	11	1	3	1591
3	Mariama Jamanka (GER)	5	6	4	3	3	5	2	4	1538
4	Jamie Poser Greubel (USA)	4	1	2	6	6	2	11	7	1493
5	Stephanie Schneider (GER)	3	4	20	1	1	DNF	3	1	1335
6	Alysia Rissling (CAN)	7	7	7	16	7	10	4	5	1288
7	Anna Köhler (GER)	12	8	14	8	5	3	17	12	1160
8	Nadezhda Sergeeva (RUS)	11	15	5	17	14	8	10	5	1112
9	Sabina Hafner (SUI)	15	17	10	12	16	7	6	8	1064
10	Christine de Bruin (CAN)	6	11	9	21	9	13	14	14	1022
11	Elfje Willemsen (BEL)	13	8	19	9	19	6	8	15	1020
12	Mica McNeill (GBR)	8	13	5	20	10	20	7	17	1000
13	Christina Hengster (AUT)	DNF	10	8	14	15	4	16	9	960
14	Aleksandra Rodionova (RUS)	10	14	11	13	12	9	20	21	922
15	Brittany Reinbolt (USA)	9	5	12	19	8	–	15	–	802
16	An Vannieuwenhuyse (BEL)	16	12	23	10	18	12	19	18	780
17	Maria Adela Constantin (ROU)	14	18	13	15	–	15	12	16	744
18	Jazmine Fenlator (JAM)	–	–	–	7	11	18	13	11	640
19	Katrin Beierl (AUT)	–	–	–	5	13	14	18	12	624
20	Andreea Grecu (ROU)	17	16	17	11	17	–	22	20	620
21	Maria Oshigiri (JPN)	19	19	16	22	20	17	21	19	592
22	Konomi Asazu (JPN)	18	20	21	23	21	16	23	22	524
23	Martina Fontanive (SUI)	–	–	–	18	–	19	5	10	482
24	Lee Seon-hye (KOR)	–	–	15	–	–	–	–	–	104
25	Heather Susanne Paes (BRA)	–	–	18	–	–	–	–	–	80
26	Kim Yoo-ran (KOR)	–	–	22	–	–	–	–	–	56

== Medal table ==
Rank	Nation	Gold	Silver	Bronze	Total
1	Germany	14	8	9	31
2	Canada	5	8	3	16
3	United States	3	7	5	15
4	Switzerland	1	0	1	2
5	Russia	1	0	0	1
6	Latvia	0	1	3	4
7	Great Britain	0	1	1	2
8	Austria	0	1	0	1
Totals (8 entries)		24	26	22	72
