= Arisa Kimishima =

Japanese bobsledder and sprinter

Personal information
- Nationality: Japanese
- Born: 23 December 1995 (age 30) Iwakuni, Japan
- Education: Nippon Sport Science University Graduate School
- Height: 1.68 m (5 ft 6 in)
- Weight: 67 kg (148 lb)

Sport
- Country: Japan
- Sport: Bobsleigh; Athletics
- Events: Bobsleigh: Two-woman; Athletics: Sprints
- Team: C.E.Management Integrated Laboratory

Achievements and titles
- Personal bests: 100 m: 11.36 (2022); 200 m: 23.53 (2022)

Arisa Kimishima (君嶋 愛梨沙, Kimishima Arisa; born 23 December 1995 in Iwakuni) is a Japanese bobsledder and sprinter. As a bobsledder, she competed in the two-woman event at the 2017 World Championships. As a sprinter, she is a former Japanese junior high school record holder in the 200 metres and the 2009 Japanese junior high school champion.

== Personal life ==
She is from Iwakuni. Her father is American and her mother is Japanese.

Her role model is Japanese sprinter Momoko Takahashi.

== Bobsleigh career ==
She made her bobsleigh debut in a Europe Cup at Königssee in February 2016, finishing first.

She finished seventh in the two-woman event at the 2017 World Championships with teammate Maria Oshigiri. As of November 2020, this is the Japanese best ever result in the bobsleigh event at the World Championships.

She made her World Cup debut in January 2017. As of November 2020, her best finish is tenth in the two-woman event at Königssee in January 2017.

=== World Championships ===
Year	Venue	Position	Event	Teammate	Time
Representing Japan
2017	Königssee, Germany	7th	Two-woman	Maria Oshigiri	3:25.82 (51.92 / 51.65 / 51.34 / 50.91)

=== World Cup ===
Year	Venue	Position	Event	Teammate	Time
Representing Japan
2016-17	St. Moritz, Switzerland	12th	Two-woman	Maria Oshigiri	2:17.97 (1:09.13 / 1:08.84)
2016-17	Königssee, Germany	10th	Two-woman	Maria Oshigiri	1:42.37 (51.04 / 51.33)
2016-17	Igls, Austria	15th	Two-woman	Maria Oshigiri	1:47.82 (53.86 / 53.96)
2016-17	Pyeongchang, South Korea	16th	Two-woman	Maria Oshigiri	1:45.01 (52.27 / 52.74)
2017-18	Lake Placid, United States	19th	Two-woman	Maria Oshigiri	1:58.50 (58.06 / 1:00.44)
2017-18	Whistler, Canada	16th	Two-woman	Maria Oshigiri	1:49.04 (54.14 / 54.90)
2017-18	Altenberg, Germany	16th	Two-woman	Konomi Asazu	1:55.41 (58.01 / 57.40)
2017-18	St. Moritz, Switzerland	23rd	Two-woman	Maria Oshigiri	1:09.66

== Athletics career ==
She began her career in athletics at Marifu Junior High School.

In 2009, she won a gold medal in the 200 metres at the Japanese junior high school championships in a new Japanese junior high school record of 24.36 seconds.

In 2013, she won a bronze medal in the 4 × 100 metres relay at the Japanese Championships with teammates Emiri Hatsumi, Ayaka Abe and Anna Doi.

In 2017, she won a gold medal in the 100 metres and a silver medal in the 4 × 100 metres relay at the Kanto University Championships. She also won a bronze medal in the 100 metres and 4 × 100 metres relay at the Japanese University Championships.

=== Personal bests ===
- 100 m: 11.36 (wind: +0.6 m/s) (Osaka 2022)
- 200 m: 23.53 (wind: +2.6 m/s) (Osaka 2022)

=== Japanese Championships podium ===
Year	Venue	Position	Event	Time
Representing Saitama Sakae High School
2013	Yokohama, Kanagawa	3rd	4×100 m relay	46.06 (relay leg: 3rd)

=== National titles ===
Year	Competition	Venue	Event	Time (s)	Notes
Representing Marifu Junior High School
2009	National Junior High School Championships	Oita, Japan	200 m	24.36 (wind: +1.6 m/s)	NJH, GR
2009	Junior Olympics Meet	Yokohama, Kanagawa	100 m (Class B)	12.32 (wind: -1.9 m/s)	
2010	National Junior Indoor Meet	Osaka, Osaka	60 m (U16)	7.75	
2010	Junior Olympics Meet	Yokohama, Kanagawa	100 m (Class A)	12.21 (wind: 0.0 m/s)	
