= Paul Muntean =

Romanian bobsledder

Personal information
- Nationality: Romanian
- Born: 4 October 1984 (age 41) Baia Mare, Romania
- Height: 1.80 m (5 ft 11 in)
- Weight: 105 kg (231 lb)

Sport
- Country: Romania
- Sport: Bobsleigh

Paul Muntean (born 4 October 1984 in Baia Mare) is a Romanian bobsledder.

Muntean competed at the 2014 Winter Olympics for Romania. He teamed with driver Andreas Neagu, Florin Cezar Crăciun, Dănuț Moldovan and Bogdan Laurentiu Otavă in the four-man event, finishing 24th.

As of April 2014, his best showing at the World Championships is 26th, coming in the four-man event in 2013.

He also competed in the 2018 Winter Olympics.
