= Gabryszak =

Gabryszak is a surname of Polish origin. Notable people with the surname include:

- Dennis Gabryszak (born 1951), American politician
- Elżbieta Gabryszak (born 1998), Polish figure skater
- Kimber Gabryszak (born 1980), American skeleton racer
