= IBSF World Championships 2017 – Two-woman =

Sliding sports competition in Germany

Two-woman at the IBSF World Championships 2017
- Venue: Königssee bobsleigh, luge, and skeleton track
- Location: Königssee, Germany
- Dates: 17–18 February
- Competitors: 44 from 22 nations
- Teams: 22
- Winning time: 3:24.75

Medalists
gold medal	Elana Meyers; Kehri Jones	United States
silver medal	Kaillie Humphries; Melissa Lotholz	Canada
bronze medal	Jamie Greubel; Aja Evans	United States

The Two-woman competition at the 2017 World Championships was held on 17 and 18 February 2017.

== Results ==
The first two runs were held on 17 and the two last runs on 18 February 2017.

Rank	Bib	Country	Athletes	Run 1	Rank	Run 2	Rank	Run 3	Rank	Run 4	Rank	Total	Behind
1st place, gold medalist(s)	14	United States	Elana Meyers; Kehri Jones	51.60	1	51.54	5	50.86	1	50.75	2	3:24.75	
2nd place, silver medalist(s)	13	Canada	Kaillie Humphries; Melissa Lotholz	51.68	2	51.48	2	50.87	2	50.75	2	3:24.78	+0.03
3rd place, bronze medalist(s)	11	United States	Jamie Greubel; Aja Evans	51.81	5	51.38	1	51.09	3	50.70	1	3:24.98	+0.23
4	15	Germany	Mariama Jamanka; Annika Drazek	51.69	3	51.69	11	51.12	4	50.85	4	3:25.35	+0.60
5	7	Austria	Christina Hengster; Jennifer Onasanya	51.93	9	51.48	2	51.15	5	50.86	5	3:25.42	+0.67
6	6	Canada	Alysia Rissling; Cynthia Appiah	51.79	4	51.65	8	51.24	6	50.95	7	3:25.63	+0.88
7	1	Japan	Maria Oshigiri; Arisa Kimishima	51.92	8	51.65	8	51.34	9	50.91	6	3:25.82	+1.07
8	4	Germany	Stephanie Schneider; Lisa Buckwitz	51.83	6	51.76	15	51.43	16	51.03	8	3:26.05	+1.30
9	17	Germany	Christin Senkel; Ann-Christin Strack	52.10	12	51.49	4	51.37	13	51.25	13	3:26.21	+1.46
10	9	Belgium	Elfje Willemsen; Sara Aerts	52.19	17	51.63	6	51.30	7	51.16	11	3:26.28	+1.53
11	18	Romania	Maria Constantin; Andreea Grecu	52.15	14	51.67	10	51.40	14	51.07	9	3:26.29	+1.54
12	12	United States	Brittany Reinbolt; Lauren Gibbs	52.11	13	51.63	6	51.30	7	51.28	14	3:26.32	+1.57
13	3	Canada	Christine de Bruin; Genevieve Thibault	52.08	11	51.70	13	51.45	17	51.13	10	3:26.36	+1.61
14	19	Switzerland	Sabina Hafner; Eveline Rebsamen	52.06	10	51.86	17	51.35	11	51.16	11	3:26.43	+1.68
15	20	Austria	Katrin Beierl; Sanne Dekker	52.15	14	51.69	11	51.40	14	51.32	15	3:26.56	+1.81
16	16	Great Britain	Mica McNeill; Mica Moore	51.84	7	51.93	18	51.46	18	51.36	16	3:26.59	+1.84
17	5	Belgium	An Vannieuwenhuyse; Nel Paulissen	52.16	16	51.77	16	51.34	9	51.36	16	3:26.63	+1.88
18	10	Russia	Alexandra Rodionova; Yulia Shokshueva	52.25	19	51.74	14	51.36	12	51.44	18	3:26.79	+2.04
19	2	Switzerland	Martina Fontanive; Rahel Rebsamen	52.24	18	52.14	19	51.56	19	51.56	19	3:27.50	+2.75
20	22	China	Ying Qing; Ma Yuanyuan	52.55	20	52.33	20	51.78	20	51.97	20	3:28.63	+3.88
—	21	Japan	Konomi Asazu; Mutumi Sakauchi	52.65	21	52.64	21	52.17	21	DNQ			
—	8	Russia	Nadezhda Sergeeva; Anastasia Kohcherzhova	DSQ									
