= Andreas Neagu =

German-born Romanian bobsledder (born 1985)

Personal information
- Full name: Andreas Paul Neagu
- Nationality: Romanian
- Born: 30 September 1985 (age 40) Brilon, West Germany
- Height: 1.81 m (5 ft 11 in)
- Weight: 92 kg (203 lb)

Sport
- Country: Romania
- Sport: Bobsleigh (driver)

Andreas Paul Neagu (born 30 September 1985 in Brilon) is a German-born Romanian bobsledder.

Neagu competed at the 2014 Winter Olympics for Romania. He teamed with Paul Muntean, Florin Cezar Crăciun, Dănuț Moldovan and Bogdan Laurentiu Otavă in the four-man event, finishing 24th.

As of April 2014, his best showing at the World Championships is 26th, coming in the four-man event in 2013.

Neagu made his World Cup debut in November 2012. As of April 2014, his best finish is 16th, in a four-man event in 2012-13 at Winterberg.
