= Bogdan Laurentiu Otavă =

Romanian bobsledder

Bogdan Otavă
Personal information
- Full name: Bogdan Laurentiu Otavă
- Nationality: Romanian
- Born: 13 February 1987 (age 38) Bucharest, Romania
- Height: 1.81 m (5 ft 11 in)
- Weight: 91 kg (201 lb)

Sport
- Country: Romania
- Sport: Bobsleigh

Bogdan Laurentiu Otavă (born 13 February 1987 in Bucharest) is a Romanian bobsledder.

Otavă competed at the 2014 Winter Olympics for Romania. He teamed with driver Andreas Neagu, Paul Muntean, Florin Cezar Crăciun and Dănuț Moldovan in the four-man event, finishing 24th. Otavă was a replacement for the third run only.

As of April 2014, his best showing at the World Championships is 16th, coming in the four-man event in 2012.

Otavă made his World Cup debut in January 2011. As of April 2014, his best finish is 11th, in a four-man event in 2011-12 at Whistler.
