= Dănuț Moldovan =

Austrian and former Romanian bobsledder (born 1991)

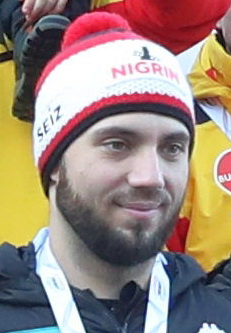
- Moldovan in 2020

Personal information
- Full name: Dănuț Ion Moldovan
- Nationality: Romanian; Austrian
- Born: 18 March 1991 (age 35) Bucharest, Romania
- Height: 1.84 m (6 ft 0 in)
- Weight: 92 kg (203 lb)

Sport
- Country: Romania; Austria
- Sport: Bobsleigh
- Event: Four-man
Medal record
Men's bobsleigh
Representing Austria
World Championships
Silver medal – second place	2016 Igls	Mixed team
Silver medal – second place	2021 Altenberg	Four-man
European Championships
Silver medal – second place	2016 St. Moritz	Four-man
Bronze medal – third place	2017 Winterberg	Four-man

Dănuț Ion Moldovan (born 18 March 1991) is an Austrian and former Romanian bobsledder.

== Career ==
Moldovan competed for Romania at the 2014 Winter Olympics. He teamed with driver Andreas Neagu, Paul Muntean, Florin Cezar Crăciun and Bogdan Laurentiu Otavă in the four-man event, finishing 24th.

As of April 2014, his best showing at the World Championships is 26th, coming in the four-man event in 2013.

Moldovan made his World Cup debut in November 2012. As of April 2014, his best finish is 16th, in a four-man event in 2012–13 at Winterberg.

He competed for Austria at the 2018 Winter Olympics.
