= Gareth Nichols =

Australian bobsledder (born 1983)

Personal information
- Nationality: Australian
- Born: 17 June 1983 (age 42)

Sport
- Sport: Bobsleigh

Gareth Nichols (born 17 June 1983) is an Australian bobsledder. He competed at the FIBT World Championships 2012 in Lake Placid, and the FIBT World Championships 2013 in St. Moritz. He competed at the 2014 Winter Olympics in Sochi, in four-man bobsleigh.
