= Michał Kasperowicz =

Polish bobsledder

Personal information
- Nationality: Polish
- Born: 8 April 1986 (age 38)

Sport
- Sport: Bobsleigh

Michał Kasperowicz (born 8 April 1986) is a Polish bobsledder. He competed at the FIBT World Championships 2011 in Königssee, and at the FIBT World Championships 2013 in St. Moritz. He competed at the 2014 Winter Olympics in Sochi, in four-man bobsleigh.
