= Sarah Noll =

German bobsledder (born 1991)

Personal information
- Born: 5 October 1991 (age 34)
- Height: 1.78 m (5 ft 10 in)
- Weight: 72 kg (159 lb; 11.3 st)

Sport
- Country: Germany
- Sport: Bobsleigh
- Turned pro: 2011
Medal record
Women´s Bobsleigh
Representing Germany
World Championships
Silver medal – second place	2013 St. Moritz	Mixed team

Sarah Noll (born 5 October 1991) is a German bobsledder who has competed since 2011.
