= Steven Deja =

German bobsledder

Personal information
- Born: 21 May 1987 (age 39)
- Height: 1.83 m (6 ft 0 in)
- Weight: 90 kg (200 lb; 14 st)

Sport
- Country: Germany
- Sport: Bobsleigh
- Turned pro: 2006
Medal record
Men´s Bobsleigh
Representing Germany
World Championships
Silver medal – second place	2012 Lake Placid	Mixed team

Steven Deja (born 21 May 1987) is a German bobsledder who has competed since 2006.
