= Daniel Zalewski =

Polish bobsledder

Personal information
- Nationality: Polish
- Born: 17 January 1992 (age 34) Tczew, Kociewie, Poland

Sport
- Sport: Bobsleigh

Daniel Zalewski (born 17 January 1992) is a Polish bobsledder. He competed in the FIBT World Championships 2013 in St. Moritz. He competed at the 2014 Winter Olympics in Sochi, in four-man bobsleigh.
