= Petra Lammert =

German shot putter and bobsledder

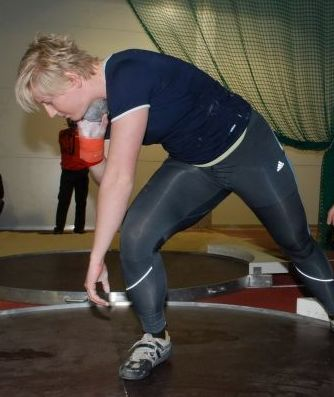
- Lammert in 2007

Personal information
- Born: 3 March 1984 (age 42) Freudenstadt, Baden-Württemberg, West Germany
Medal record
Representing Germany
Women's athletics
European Championships
Silver medal – second place	2006 Gothenburg	Shot put
European Indoor Championships
Gold medal – first place	2009 Turin	Shot put
Women's bobsleigh
World Championships
Silver medal – second place	2012 Lake Placid	Two-woman
European Championships
Silver medal – second place	2012 Altenberg	Two-woman

Petra Lammert (born 3 March 1984) is a German former shot putter and current bobsledder. She was the 2009 European Indoor champion in the shot put and medallist at the 2006 European Athletics Championships. Her personal best throw in the shot put is 20.04 metres, achieved in May 2007 in Zeven. She was the runner-up in the two-woman bobsled at the 2012 World Championships.

== Career ==
Lammert's first international medal came at the 2003 European Athletics Junior Championships, where she won the bronze medal. She came fifth at the 2005 European Athletics Indoor Championships, won the shot put title at the 2005 European Athletics U23 Championships, and went on to represent her country at the 2005 World Championships in Athletics later that year. In 2006, she was the German Champion in the shot put both indoors and out and won her event at the 2006 European Cup. She was fourth at the 2006 IAAF World Indoor Championships and won her first major senior medal at the 2006 European Athletics Championships, taking the bronze with a throw of 19.17 metres.

She began the following season with a win at the 2007 European Cup Winter Throwing. She achieved her personal best throw of 20.04 m in May that year and managed fifth place at the 2007 World Championships in Athletics held in Osaka. She narrowly missed out on a medal at the 2007 IAAF World Athletics Final, ending the competition in fourth place. She missed major competitions in 2008, but returned to win her first major title at the 2009 European Athletics Indoor Championships by throwing an indoor best of 19.66 m. She was the runner-up at the 2010 European Team Championships and finished behind Nadine Kleinert at the 2010 German Athletics Championships. Lammert placed sixth at the 2010 European Athletics Championships in Barcelona.

In November 2010 she announced her retirement from the sport through persistent elbow injury she had first sustained after a fall in training two years earlier. In early 2011 she decided to turn her athletic prowess to bobsleigh and she quickly established herself as one of Germany's best female brakewomen. She was selected to compete in the two-woman event at the FIBT World Championships 2012 alongside Sandra Kiriasis and won the silver medal, finishing a third of a second behind the winning Canadian team. In the 2011–12 Bobsleigh World Cup series she finished in the top three in Igls, Altenberg and Calgary.

== Shot put achievements ==
Year	Competition	Venue	Position	Notes
Representing Germany
2005	European Indoor Championships	Madrid, Spain	4th	18.69 m
2005	European U23 Championships	Erfurt, Germany	1st	18.97 m
2005	World Athletics Final	Monte Carlo, Monaco	5th	18.49 m
2006	World Indoor Championships	Moscow, Russia	4th	19.21 m
2006	European Championships	Gothenburg, Sweden	3rd	19.17 m
2006	World Athletics Final	Stuttgart, Germany	5th	18.67 m
2007	World Championships	Osaka, Japan	6th	19.33 m
2009	European Indoor Championships	Turin, Italy	1st	19.66 m
2010	European Championships	Barcelona, Spain	6th	18.94 m
