= Romain Heinrich =

French bobsledder (born 1990)

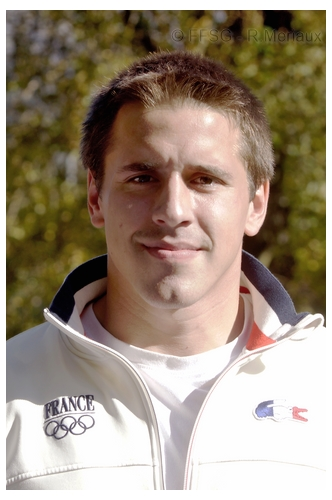

Personal information
- Born: 30 January 1990 (age 36) Colmar, France
- Height: 1.88 m (6 ft 2 in)
- Weight: 105 kg (231 lb)

Sport
- Country: France
- Sport: Bobsleigh

Achievements and titles
- Olympic finals: 3
Medal record
Men's bobsleigh
Representing France
European Championship
| Bronze medal – third place | 2019 Königssee | Two-man |

Romain Heinrich (born 30 January 1990 in Colmar) is a French bobsledder.

Heinrich competed at the 2014 Winter Olympics for France. He teamed with driver Loic Costerg in the two-man event, finishing 20th, and in the France-1 sled with Costerg, Florent Ribet and Elly Lefort in the four-man event, finishing 17th.

As of April 2014, his best showing at the World Championships is 17th, in the 2013 two-man event.

Heinrich made his World Cup debut in December 2011. As of April 2014, his best finish is 14th, in two events in 2013-14.
