= Kimber Gabryszak =

American skeleton racer (born 1980)

Kimber Gabryszak (born September 2, 1980) is an American skeleton racer who has competed since 2005. Her best Skeleton World Cup finish was 7th in St Moritz, Switzerland, January, 2012. Her best World Championship finish was 16th at the Königssee, Germany 2011 FIBT World Championships. Kimber was 3rd at US National Championships.

A native of Alaska, Gabryszak currently resides in Park City, Utah.
