= Loïc Costerg =

French bobsledder

Loic Costerg
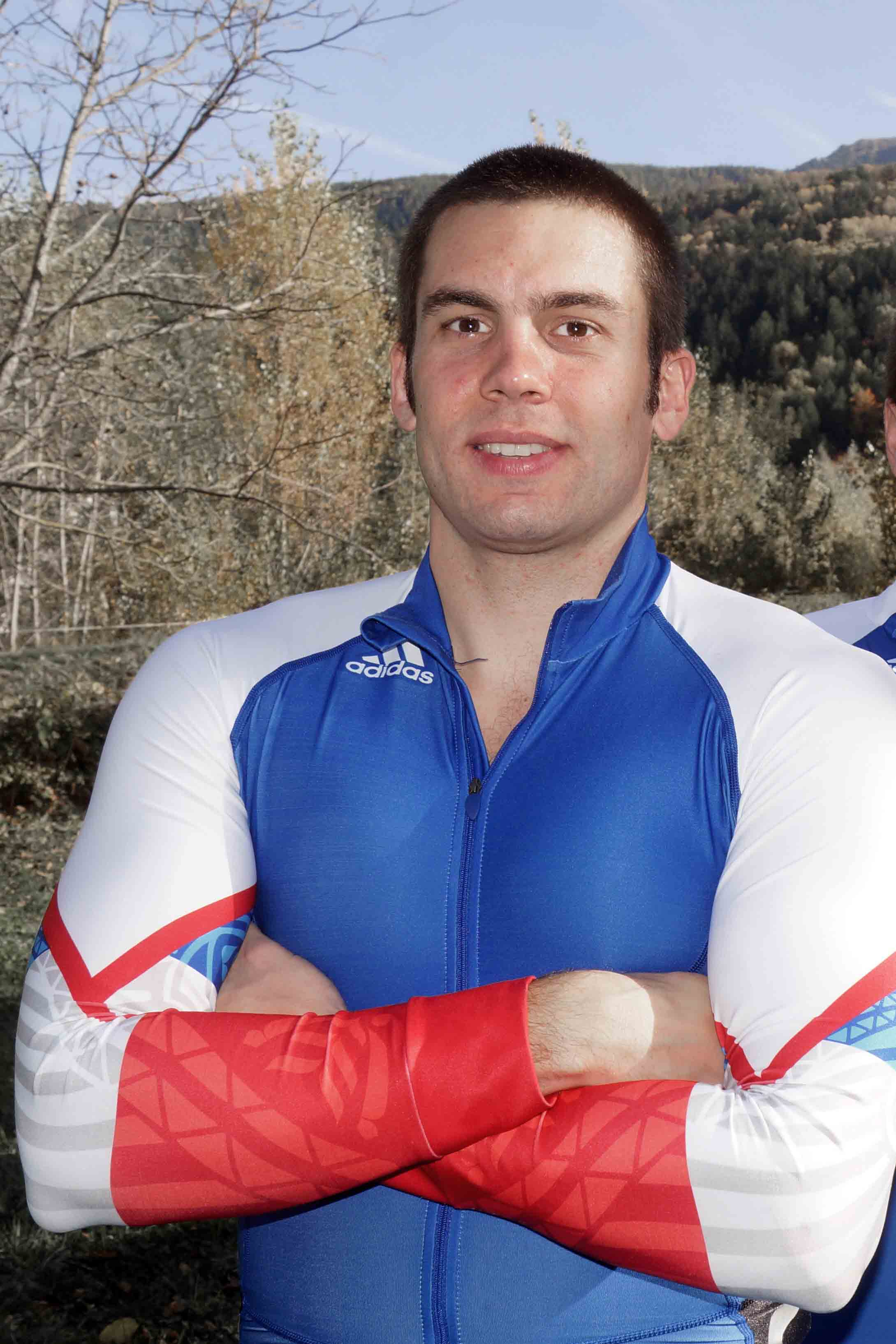
- Loïc Costerg in 2013

Personal information
- Nationality: French
- Born: 9 May 1987 (age 38) Moûtiers, France
- Height: 1.85 m (6 ft 1 in)
- Weight: 90 kg (198 lb)

Sport
- Country: France
- Sport: Bobsleigh (driver)

Loic Costerg (born 9 May 1987 in Moûtiers) is a French bobsledder.

Costerg competed at the 2014 Winter Olympics for France. He teamed with brakeman Romain Heinrich in the two-man event, finishing 20th, and in the France-1 sled with Florent Ribet, Heinrich and Elly Lefort in the four-man event, finishing 17th.

As of April 2014, his best showing at the World Championships is 17th, in the 2013 two-man event.

Costerg made his World Cup debut in December 2013. As of April 2014, his best finish is 14th, in 2013–14 at Park City.
