= Aja Evans =

American bobsledder (born 1988)

Aja Evans OLY
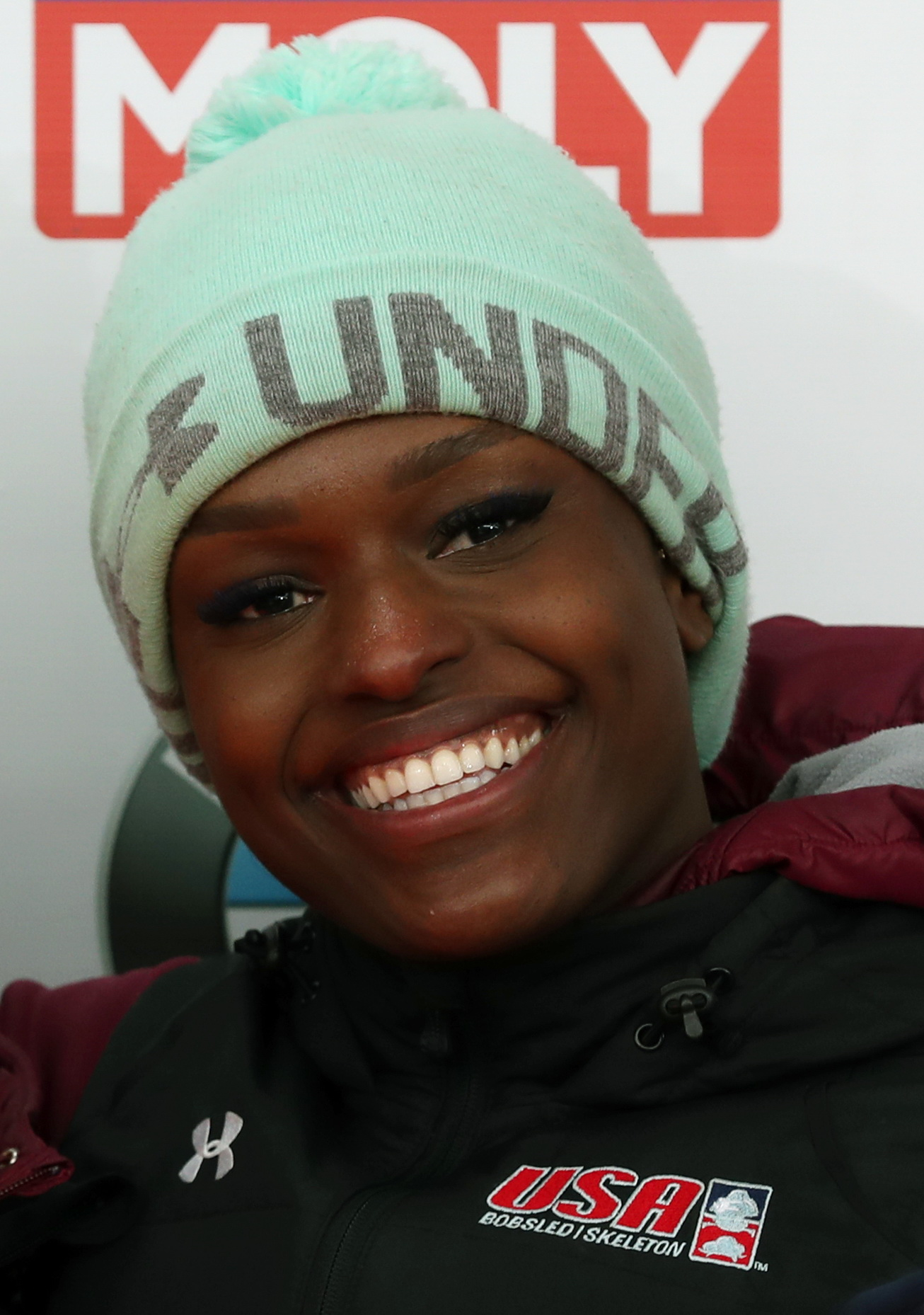
- Evans in March 2017

Personal information
- Full name: Aja L. Evans
- Born: May 12, 1988 (age 38) Chicago, Illinois, U.S.
- Home town: Homewood, Illinois, U.S.
- Height: 5 ft 10 in (178 cm)
- Weight: 170 lb (77 kg)

Sport
- Sport: Bobsleigh
- College team: University of Nevada, Las Vegas; University of Illinois at Urbana–Champaign
Medal record
Women's bobsleigh
Representing the United States
Olympic Games
| Bronze medal – third place | 2014 Sochi | Two-woman |
World Championships
| Bronze medal – third place | 2017 Königssee | Two-woman |

Aja L. Evans (born May 12, 1988) is an American Olympic medalist bobsledder (two-woman) who competes as a brakeman. At her Chicago public high school she was an All-American track & field City Champion in sprints and shot put. As a college athlete she was an All-American and Big Ten Champion shot putter.

== Career ==
Aja Evans began track and field training at Morgan Park High School on the far south side of Chicago, Illinois. She attended UNLV before transferring to the University of Illinois. Evans was a college record setting, five-time All-American and three-time Big Ten Champion shot potter at the University of Illinois.

Evans began competing in the bobsled after graduation. She was a brakeman for drivers Jamie Greubel, Elana Meyers, and Jazmine Fenlator in the 2012–2013 World Cup season, earning a bronze in Igls and a silver at the Sochi. In the 2013–2014 World Cup season, she earned silver at Calgary and gold at Park City.

Evans was named to the U.S. Olympic bobsled team for the 2014 Winter Olympics on January 19, 2014.

On February 19, 2014, Evans, along with Jamie Greubel, won the bronze medal at the 2014 Winter Olympics.

In 2023, Evans filed a lawsuit alleging that she was groped and inappropriately photographed by her team's chiropractor over a period of nearly a decade. Evans' attorney compared the doctor's conduct to that of Larry Nassar, but he denied the accusations and labeled them “detestable”.

== Family ==
Evans comes from a family of athletes. Her father, Fred, became the first black national collegiate champion in swimming when he competed for Chicago State. Her brother, also named Fred, is a defensive tackle for the Minnesota Vikings. Her uncle is retired Major League Baseball outfielder Gary Matthews and her cousin is baseball player Gary Matthews, Jr.

“I’m a product of Chicago,” said Evans. “Showing people that this black girl from Chicago came to the Winter Olympic sport and really did some amazing things, and it was all because I had that will to win and it was my dream."
