= Eric Neilson (skeleton racer) =

Canadian skeleton racer (born 1981)

Personal information
- Nickname: Face Man
- Nationality: Canadian
- Born: 29 January 1981 (age 45) Lethbridge, Alberta
- Height: 1.85 m (6 ft 1 in)
- Weight: 87 kg (192 lb)

Sport
- Country: Canada
- Sport: Skeleton
- Coached by: Duff Gibson

Achievements and titles
- Olympic finals: Sochi Olympics 2014
- National finals: 2009 Europa Cup #5, Igls, AUT: 2 2009 Europa Cup #8, St. Moritz, SUI: 3 2008 Europa Cup #4, Alternberg, GER: 3 2010 - Intercontinental Cup #2, Altenberg, GER: DNF 2010 - Intercontinental Cup #1, Winterberg, GER: 9 2010 - Europa Cup #8, St. Moritz, SUI: 3 2010 - Europa Cup #7, Cesana, ITA: 9 2009 - Europa Cup #6, Igls, AUT: 4 2009 - Europa Cup #5, Igls, AUT: 2 2009 - Europa Cup #4, Altenberg, GER: 3 2009 - Europa Cup #3, Altenberg, GER: 12 2009 - Europa Cup #2, Konigssee, GER: 14 2009 - Europa Cup #1, Konigssee, GER: 7 2009 - America's Cup #8, Lake Placid, USA: 16 2009 - America's Cup #7, Lake Placid, USA: 13 2008 - America's Cup #6, Lake Placid, USA: 19 2008 - America's Cup #5, Lake Placid, USA: 18 2008 - America's Cup #4, Park City, USA: 11 2008 - America's Cup #3, Park City, USA: 7 2008 - America's Cup #6, Lake Placid, USA: 8 2008 - America's Cup #5, Lake Placid, USA: 14
Medal record
Men's skeleton
Representing Canada
World Championships
Bronze medal – third place	2013 St. Moritz	Mixed team

Eric Neilson (born 27 January 1981) is a Canadian skeleton racer who has competed since 2009. Neilson first took up the sport in 2006 and in 2009, he joined the Canadian national squad.
