= Yelena Yudina =

Russian skeleton racer (born 1988)

Yelena Vyacheslavovna Yudina (Russian: Елена Вячеславовна Юдина) (born April 22, 1988 in Voronezh) is a Russian skeleton racer who has been competing since 2005. Her best World Cup finish was 11th in Altenberg, Germany in December 2009.

Yudina qualified for the 2010 Winter Olympics where she finished 18th.
