= Elly Lefort =

French and Monegasque bobsledder (born 1987)

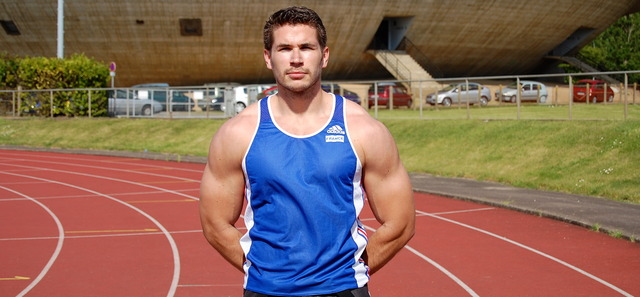

Personal information
- Born: 4 November 1987 (age 38) Saint-Nazaire, France
- Height: 1.87 m (6 ft 2 in)
- Weight: 100 kg (220 lb)

Sport
- Country: France
- Sport: Bobsleigh

Elly Lefort (born 4 November 1987 in Saint-Nazaire) is a French and Monegasque bobsledder. He competed for Monaco until the 2013–14 season, before switching to compete for France.

Lefort competed at the 2014 Winter Olympics for France. He teamed with driver Loïc Costerg, Florent Ribet and Romain Heinrich in the France-1 sled in the four-man event, finishing 17th.

As of April 2014, his best showing at the World Championships is 20th, coming in the two-man event in 2013.

Lefort made his World Cup debut in November 2009. As of April 2014, his best finish is 8th, in a pair of events in 2010-11.
