= Yury Selikhov =

Russian bobsledder

Personal information
- Nationality: Russian
- Born: 19 May 1986 (age 38)

Sport
- Sport: Bobsleigh

Yury Selikhov (born 19 May 1986) is a Russian bobsledder. He competed in the two-man event at the 2018 Winter Olympics.
