= Florent Ribet =

French bobsledder

Personal information
- Nationality: French
- Born: 20 May 1989 (age 36) Grenoble, France
- Height: 1.83 m (6 ft 0 in)
- Weight: 96 kg (212 lb)

Sport
- Country: France
- Sport: Bobsleigh

Florent Ribet (born 20 May 1989 in Grenoble) is a French bobsledder.

Ribet competed at the 2014 Winter Olympics for France. He teamed with driver Loïc Costerg, Romain Heinrich and Elly Lefort in the France-1 sled in the four-man event, finishing 17th.

Ribet made his World Cup debut in December 2013. As of April 2014, his best finish is 20th, in four events in 2013-14.
