= Kehri Jones =

American bobsledder (born 1993)

Kehri LeShaun Jones
Personal information
- Nationality: American
- Born: November 30, 1993 (age 32) Fort Hood, Texas
- Height: 5 ft 1 in (155 cm)
- Weight: 140 lb (64 kg)

Sport
- Country: United States
- Sport: Bobsleigh
Medal record
Gold medal – first place	2017 Königssee	Two-woman

Kehri Jones (born November 30, 1993) is an American bobsledder. She won gold at the 2017 IBSF World Championships in Königssee alongside Elana Meyers in the two-women bobsled event.
