= Bree Schaaf =

American bobsledder and skeleton racer

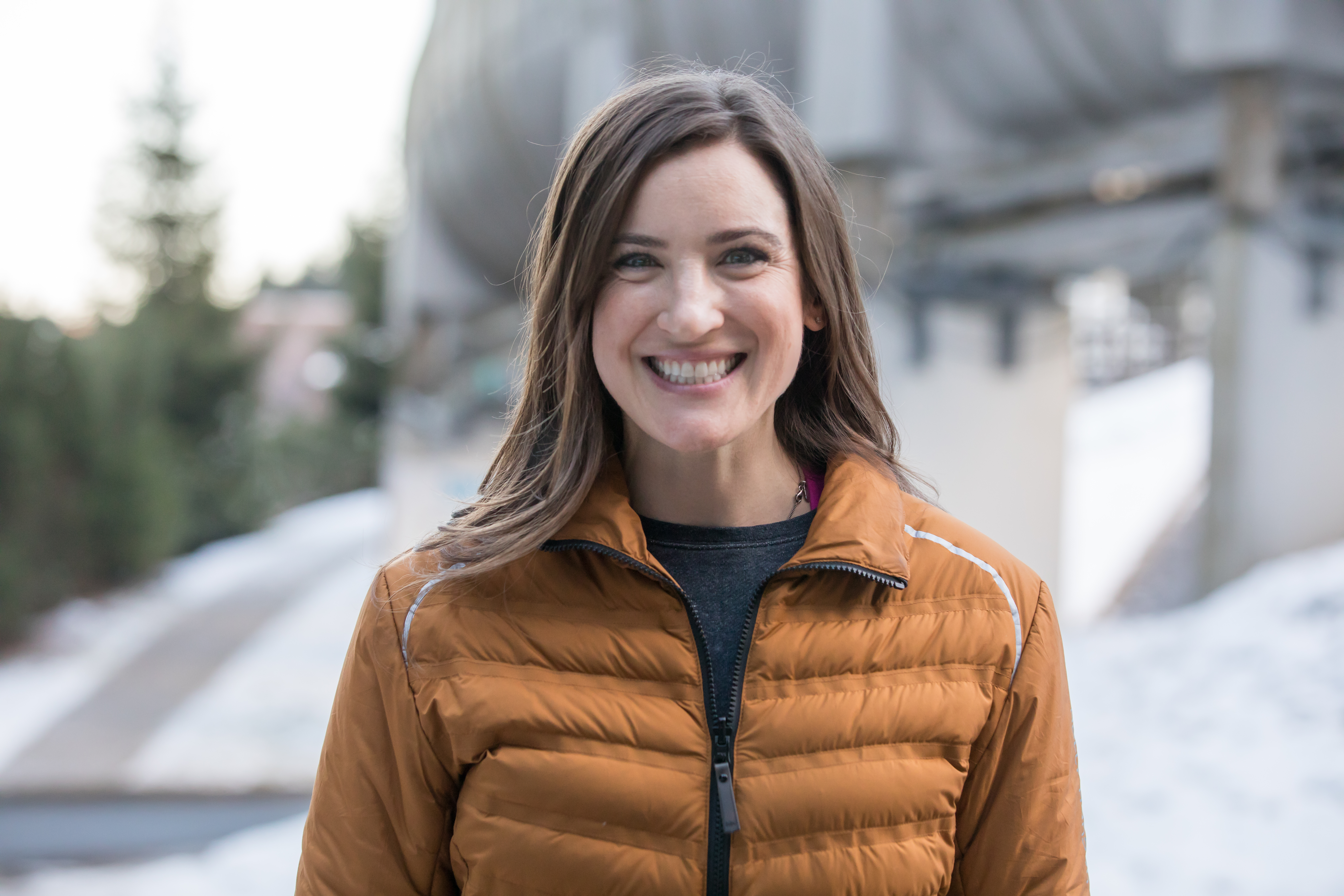
Schaaf in 2017 (Altenberg, Germany)

Bree Schaaf (born May 28, 1980) is an American skeleton racer who competed from 2002 to 2007, then switched over to bobsled as a pilot from 2007 to 2014. Her best Skeleton World Cup finish was sixth at Calgary in November 2006.

== Early years ==
In Elementary School, Bree was a star player on the Tracyton Tigers soccer club with Carrie Campbell.

In high school, she competed in track, volleyball, and basketball before playing volleyball exclusively. She earned a scholarship for volleyball and played collegiately at Portland State University in Oregon. Schaaf graduated with high honors and a BA in anthropology.

== Sledding ==
Schaaf's best finish in skeleton at the FIBT World Championships was 11th in the women's event at St. Moritz in 2007.

She switched to bobsled for 2007–8, starting on lower racing circuits before qualifying to race World Cup in 2009 after winning the 2009 US National Championship in bobsled. Bree also finished 4th at the Bobsled World Cup in Park City, Utah in November 2009. She also took 6th at the 2009 World Cup Whistler track debut, and 5th at the February 2009 World Cup race in Park City, with 9 top-ten world cup finishes in total.

It was announced on January 16, 2010, that she made the US bobsled team for the 2010 Winter Olympics. She finished fifth in the two-woman event.

== Broadcasting ==
In 2009 Schaaf started work as a sliding commentator for Universal Sports Network. She joined NBC's team at Sliding Center Sanki for the 2014 Winter Olympics.
