= Caroline Spahni =

Swiss bobsledder (born 1982)

Caroline Spahni (born 4 May 1982) is a Swiss former bobsledder who has competed since 2007. She finished 12th in the two-woman event at the 2010 Winter Olympics in Vancouver.

Spahni's best World Cup finish was sixth in the two-woman event at St. Moritz in January 2010.

She retired from competition at the end of the 2013-14 season.
