= Emily Azevedo =

American bobsledder (born 1983)

Personal information
- Full name: Emily Dianne Azevedo
- Born: April 28, 1983 (age 43) Chico, California, U.S.
- Height: 5 ft 8 in (172 cm)
- Weight: 180 lb (80 kg)
Medal record
Women's bobsleigh
Representing United States
World Championships
Gold medal – first place	2012 Lake Placid	Mixed team
Silver medal – second place	2007 St. Moritz	Mixed team
Bronze medal – third place	2008 Altenberg	Mixed team

Emily Dianne Azevedo (born April 28, 1983) is an American bobsledder who has competed since 2002. She won two medals in the mixed bobsleigh-skeleton team event at the FIBT World Championships with a silver in 2007 and a bronze in 2008.

A native of Chico, California, Azevedo graduated from the University of California, Davis. While at UC-Davis, she competed in track and field in the 100 m hurdles. Azevedo decided to compete in bobsleigh after watching the 2006 Winter Olympics in Turin. She is supported by her parents, Dr. Alan and Wendy Azevedo and her sisters Amber, Chelsea and Geneva.

It was announced on 16 January 2010 that Azvedo made the US team for the 2010 Winter Olympics where she finished fifth in the two-woman event.
