= Michael Klingler =

Liechtenstein bobsledder (born 1983)

Michael Klingler (born 6 February 1983 in Grabs) is a Swiss-born Liechtensteiner bobsledder who has competed since 2003. At the 2010 Winter Olympics in Vancouver, he crashed out in the two-man event and withdrew from the four-man event.

Klingler's best overall finish was fourth in a two-man event in a lesser event at Lake Placid, New York, in December 2009.
