= Timothy Randall =

Canadian bobsledder

Personal information
- Born: 19 June 1986 (age 40) Hamilton, Ontario, Canada
- Height: 5 ft 10 in (178 cm)
- Weight: 105 kg (231 lb)

Sport
- Country: Canada
- Sport: Bobsleigh
Medal record
Men´s Bobsleigh
Representing Canada
World Championships
Bronze medal – third place	2012 Lake Placid	Mixed team

Timothy Randall (born 19 June 1986) is a Canadian bobsledder.

In 2012, Randall was part of the Canada 2 team that won a bronze medal at the World Cup event in Whistler.
