= John Farrow (skeleton racer) =

Australian skeleton racer

Personal information
- Born: 18 February 1982 (age 44) Sydney, New South Wales
- Height: 188 cm (6 ft 2 in) (2014)
- Weight: 85 kg (187 lb) (2014)

Sport
- Country: Australia
- Sport: Skeleton
- Event: Individual Men
- Updated on 6 February 2014

John Farrow (born 18 February 1982) is an Australian skeleton racer who has competed since 2008. His best career finish was third in lesser events at Park City, Utah in December 2009.

Farrow qualified for the 2010 Winter Olympics, but did not compete.
