= Maria Marinela Mazilu =

Romanian skeleton racer

Marinela Mazilu
Personal information
- Full name: Maria Marinela Mazilu
- Born: 12 April 1991 (age 35) Râmnicu Vâlcea, Romania
- Height: 158 cm (5 ft 2 in)
- Weight: 65 kg (143 lb)

Sport
- Country: Romania
- Sport: skeleton
- Coached by: Marius Ene

Achievements and titles
- Olympic finals: 19th (Vancouver 2010); 20th (Sochi 2014); 18th (Pyeongchang 2018)
- World finals: 19th (St. Moritz 2013); junior: 3rd (Innsbruck 2012 and Winterberg 2014)
- Personal best: World Cup: 10th (Igls 2015 #2)

Maria Marinela Mazilu (born 12 April 1991 in Râmnicu Vâlcea) is a Romanian skeleton racer on the Skeleton World Cup circuit. She began competing in 2002 and was selected to the national team in 2004. She was the bronze medalist at the Junior World Championships at Igls in 2012 and again at Winterberg in 2014. Mazilu qualified for the 2010 Winter Olympics in Vancouver where she finished 19th, and for the 2014 Winter Olympics in Sochi where she finished 20th.
