= John Daly (skeleton racer) =

American skeleton racer (born 1985)

Personal information
- Born: June 10, 1985 (age 41) Queens, New York, U.S.
- Height: 5 ft 9 in (175 cm)
- Weight: 175 lb (79 kg)

Sport
- Country: United States
- Sport: Skeleton
Medal record
Men's skeleton
Representing the United States
World Championships
Gold medal – first place	2013 St. Moritz	Mixed team

John Daly (born June 10, 1985) is an American skeleton racer who has competed since 2001. He has been on the World Cup podium many times, at such tracks as Winterberg, Calgary, and St. Moritz.

== Career ==
Prior to competing in skeleton, Daly was a BMX racer but stopped after breaking both wrists during a practice run. He also competed in track and field while in high school and college.

Daly began competing in the sport of skeleton in 2001. From 2001 to 2010, he won gold in the Intercontinental Cup and America's Cup where he reset the Lake Placid track record. In the 2008–09 season, Daly won 1st in the St. Moritz Europa Cup as well as the Igls Europa Cup and went on to get 2nd place for the overall Europa Cup title.

It was announced on January 17, 2010, that Daly had qualified for the 2010 Winter Olympics in Vancouver where he finished 17th.

On January 18, 2014, Daly was named to the 2014 Olympic team. After slipping at the start in his final run, which he entered in a close race for 3rd place, Daly finished in 15th place.

Daly and Matt Antoine were named to represent the U.S. at the 2018 Winter Olympics in Pyeongchang.

== Personal life ==
Daly graduated from the SUNY Plattsburgh with a communications degree in 2008. He also was a member of Plattsburgh's track & field team, where he focused on the decathlon. At the 2007 NCAA Division III outdoor track & field championships, he finished in fifth place in the decathlon, collecting All-American status.

== LIRR announcements ==
Daly made announcements on the Long Island Railroad sound system (LIRR) during the 2018 Olympic season that reminds riders to watch the gap between the train and the Platform.
