= Konomi Asazu =

Japanese bobsledder (born 1986)

Konomi Asazu (浅津 このみ, Asazu Konomi; born October 23, 1986 in Izumo, Shimane) is a Japanese bobsledder who has competed since 2009. She finished 16th in the 2010 Winter Olympics in Vancouver.

Azasu's best World Cup finish was 18th twice both in early 2010.
