= Patrick Bloechliger =

Swiss bobsledder (born 1983)

Patrick Bloechliger (born 26 June 1983) is a Swiss bobsledder who has competed since 2003. His best Bobsleigh World Cup finish was second in the four-man event at Cesana Pariol in January 2008.

Bloechliger's best finish at the FIBT World Championships was 11th in the four-man event at Altenberg in 2008.
