= Jamie Greubel =

American bobsledder (born 1983)

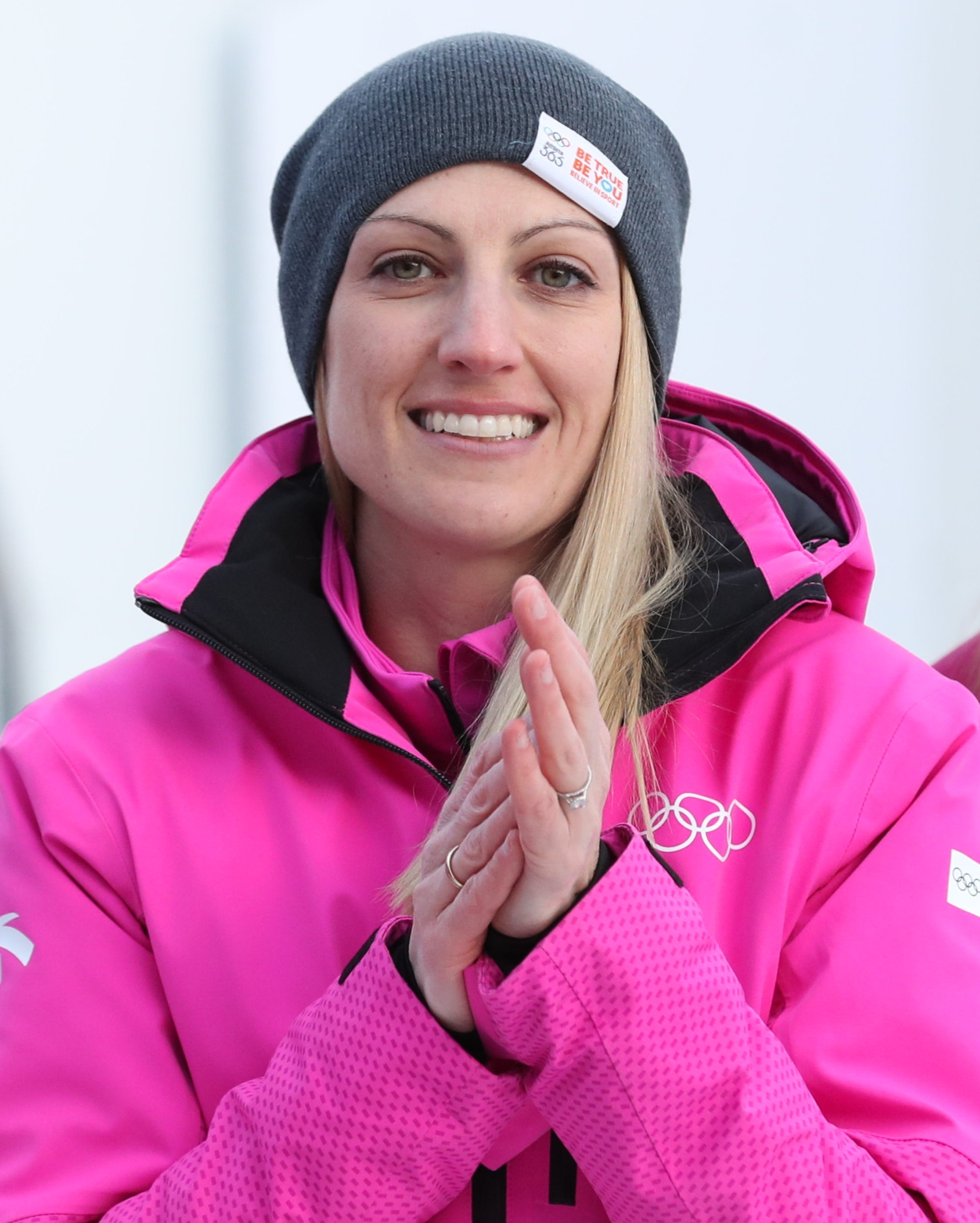
- Greubel Poser in 2020

Personal information
- Full name: Jamie Greubel Poser
- Born: November 9, 1983 (age 42) Princeton, New Jersey, U.S.
- Home town: Newtown, Pennsylvania, U.S.
- Height: 5 ft 9 in (175 cm)
- Spouse: Christian Poser (m. 2014)

Sport
- Sport: Bobsleigh
Medal record
Olympic Games
Bronze medal – third place	2014 Sochi	Two-woman
World Championships
Bronze medal – third place	2017 Königssee	Two-woman

Jamie Greubel Poser (born November 9, 1983) née Greubel is an American bobsledder who won her first Bobsleigh World Cup medal in December 2012. She won the Bronze medal at the 2014 Winter Olympics in the Two-woman Bobsleigh event.

Greubel graduated from the Hun School of Princeton in Princeton, New Jersey in 2002 and Cornell University in 2006. Greubel competed in field hockey and track in high school and was a heptathlete in college. She set Cornell records in the heptathlon and indoor pentathlon. She holds a master's degree in education.

Greubel took up bobsledding after graduating from college at the suggestion of one of her college track and field teammates. She first made the U.S. national bobsled team in 2007–2008 season Greubel started in the sport as a brakeman but switched over to pilot in 2010.

== Personal life ==
Greubel became engaged to German bobsledder Christian Poser in April 2013. The couple married in the summer of 2014.
