= Florin Cezar Crăciun =

Romanian bobsledder

Florin Cezar Crăciun (born 27 June 1989) is a Romanian bobsledder who has competed since 2008. At the 2010 Winter Olympics in Vancouver, he finished 11th in the two-man event and 15th in the four-man event.

At the FIBT World Championships, Crăciun earned his best finish of 8th in the two-man event at Königssee in 2011.
