= Bobsleigh at the 2014 Winter Olympics – Two-woman =

Two-woman at the XXII Olympic Winter Games
- Pictogram for bobsleigh
- Dates: 18–19 February 2014
- Competitors: 38 from 13 nations
- Winning time: 3:50.61

Medalists
| 1st place, gold medalist(s) | | Kaillie Humphries; Heather Moyse | Canada |
| 2nd place, silver medalist(s) | | Elana Meyers; Lauryn Williams | United States |
| 3rd place, bronze medalist(s) | | Jamie Greubel; Aja Evans | United States |

The two-woman bobsleigh competition at the 2014 Winter Olympics in Sochi, Russia was held at the Sliding Center Sanki near Krasnaya Polyana, Russia on 18–19 February.

Kaillie Humphries and Heather Moyse of Canada repeated as Olympic Champions, becoming the first duo to do so.

== Records ==
While the IOC does not consider bobsled times eligible for Olympic records, the FIBT does maintain records for both the start and a complete run at each track at which it competes.

== Results ==
Top finish in each run is in boldface. TR – track record.

On 24 November 2017, the Russian pair were disqualified after Olga Stulneva was sanctioned for a doping violation. After a CAS decision on 1 February 2018, the sanctions were annulled and their result was reinstated.

| Rank | Bib | Country | Athletes | Run 1 | Run 2 | Run 3 | Run 4 | Total | Behind |
|---|---|---|---|---|---|---|---|---|---|
| 1st place, gold medalist(s) | 1 | Canada (CAN-1) | Kaillie Humphries; Heather Moyse | 57.39 | 57.73 | **57.57** | **57.92** | 3:50.61 | — |
| 2nd place, silver medalist(s) | 2 | United States (USA-1) | Elana Meyers; Lauryn Williams | **57.26** TR | **57.63** | 57.69 | 58.13 | 3:50.71 | +0.10 |
| 3rd place, bronze medalist(s) | 3 | United States (USA-2) | Jamie Greubel; Aja Evans | 57.45 | 58.00 | 58.00 | 58.16 | 3:51.61 | +1.00 |
| 4 | 9 | Netherlands (NED-1) | Esmé Kamphuis; Judith Vis | 57.94 | 58.10 | 58.20 | 58.03 | 3:52.27 | +1.66 |
| 5 | 4 | Germany (GER-1) | Sandra Kiriasis; Franziska Fritz | 57.95 | 58.08 | 58.06 | 58.20 | 3:52.29 | +1.68 |
| 6 | 10 | Belgium (BEL-1) | Elfje Willemsen; Hanna Mariën | 57.92 | 58.02 | 58.33 | 58.30 | 3:52.57 | +1.96 |
| 7 | 5 | Germany (GER-2) | Cathleen Martini; Christin Senkel | 57.99 | 58.42 | 58.17 | 58.13 | 3:52.71 | +2.10 |
| 8 | 8 | Switzerland (SUI-1) | Fabienne Meyer; Tanja Mayer | 58.18 | 58.34 | 58.29 | 58.39 | 3:53.20 | +2.59 |
| 9 | 11 | Russia (RUS-1) | Olga Stulneva; Liudmila Udobkina | 58.03 | 58.24 | 58.45 | 58.74 | 3:53.46 | +2.85 |
| 10 | 6 | Germany (GER-3) | Anja Schneiderheinze; Stephanie Schneider | 58.17 | 58.30 | 58.53 | 58.74 | 3:53.74 | +3.13 |
| 11 | 7 | United States (USA-3) | Jazmine Fenlator; Lolo Jones | 58.27 | 58.46 | 58.50 | 58.74 | 3:53.97 | +3.36 |
| 12 | 12 | Great Britain (GBR-1) | Paula Walker; Rebekah Wilson | 58.36 | 58.40 | 58.88 | 58.60 | 3:54.24 | +3.63 |
| 13 | 13 | Canada (CAN-2) | Jennifer Ciochetti; Chelsea Valois | 58.43 | 58.63 | 58.72 | 58.71 | 3:54.49 | +3.88 |
| 14 | 14 | Australia (AUS-1) | Astrid Radjenovic; Jana Pittman | 58.62 | 58.50 | 59.06 | 58.37 | 3:54.55 | +3.94 |
| 15 | 15 | Austria (AUT-1) | Christina Hengster; Viola Kleiser; Alexandra Tüchi (Note: Kleiser competed in the first two runs, Tüchi in runs three and four.) | 58.59 | 58.56 | 58.73 | 58.91 | 3:54.79 | +4.18 |
| 16 | 17 | Russia (RUS-2) | Nadezhda Sergeeva; Nadezhda Paleeva | 58.80 | 58.69 | 59.27 | 59.10 | 3:55.86 | +5.25 |
| 17 | 16 | Romania (ROU-1) | Maria Constantin; Andreea Grecu | 59.04 | 59.08 | 59.38 | 59.09 | 3:56.59 | +5.98 |
| 18 | 18 | South Korea (KOR-1) | Kim Sun-ok; Shin Mi-Hwa | 1:00.09 | 1:00.02 | 1:00.44 | 1:00.26 | 4:00.81 | +10.20 |
| 19 | 19 | Brazil (BRA-1) | Fabiana Santos; Sally Mayara da Silva | 59.57 | 1:00.45 | 1:00.73 | 1:01.20 | 4:01.95 | +11.34 |
