= Bobsleigh at the 2010 Winter Olympics – Two-woman =

Two-woman at the XXI Olympic Winter Games
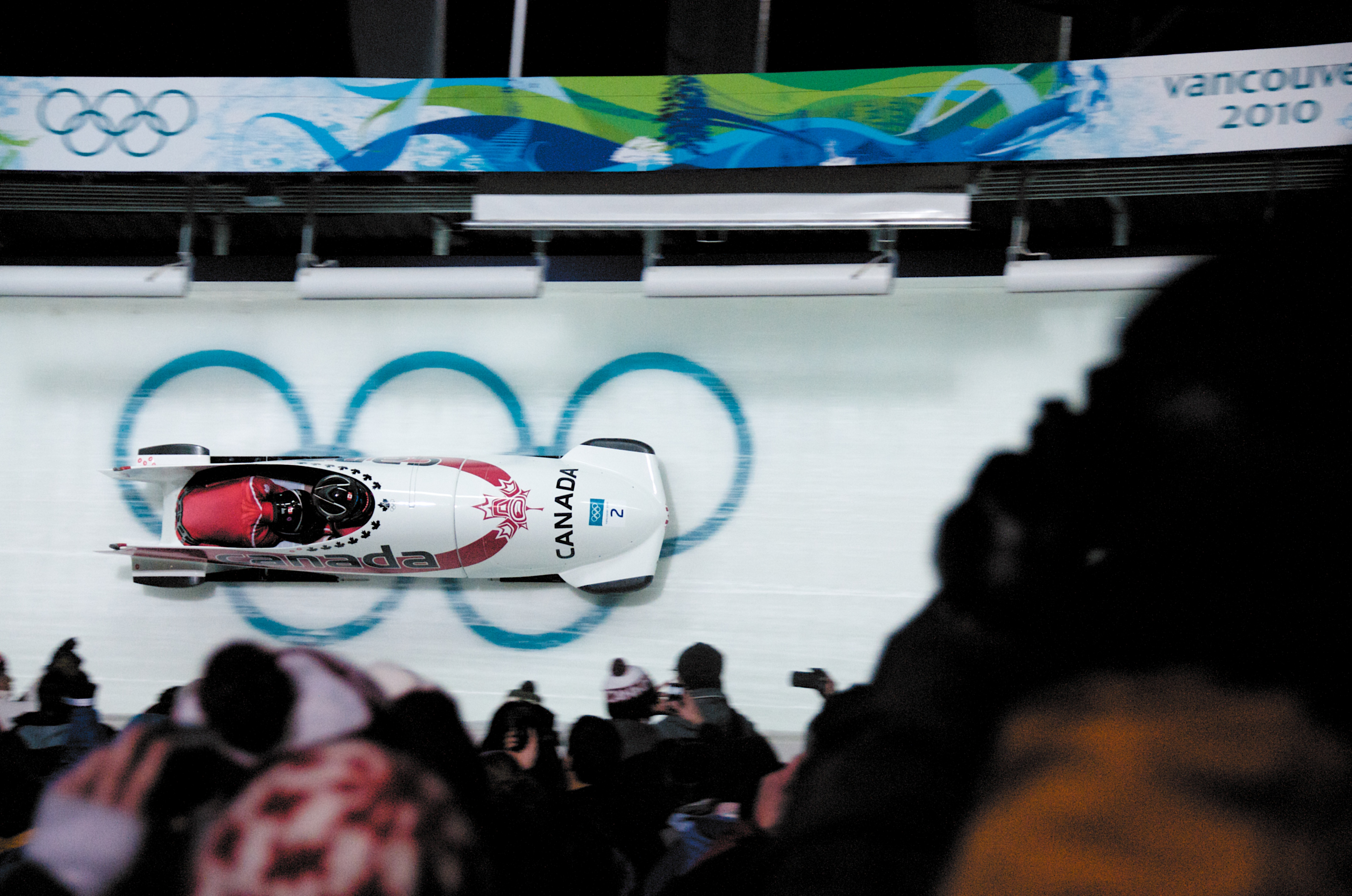
- Gold medalist Canada-1 team of Kaillie Humphries (driving sled) and Heather Moyse during the fourth run of the bobsleigh two-woman event on 24 February 2010.
- Venue: Whistler Sliding Centre
- Dates: 23–24 February 2010
- Competitors: 21 teams from 13 nations
- Winning time: 3:32.28

Medalists
1st place, gold medalist(s)		Kaillie Humphries; Heather Moyse	Canada
2nd place, silver medalist(s)		Helen Upperton; Shelley-Ann Brown	Canada
3rd place, bronze medalist(s)		Erin Pac; Elana Meyers	United States

The two-woman bobsleigh competition at the 2010 Winter Olympics in Vancouver, British Columbia, Canada, was held at the Whistler Sliding Centre in Whistler, British Columbia, on 20–21 February.

Going into the event, the German team of Sandra Kiriasis and Anja Schneiderheinze (Schneiderheinze-Stöckel since 2007) were the reigning 2006 Olympic Champions, while Great Britain's team of Nicole Minichiello and Gillian Cooke were the reigning 2009 World Champions. The February 2009 test event held at the Olympic venue was won by the American duo of Shauna Rohbock and Elana Meyers. The last 2009–10 Bobsleigh World Cup event took place four weeks prior to the 2010 Games and was won by the American duo of Rohbock and Michelle Rzepka while Kiriasis had finished on top of the overall 2009–10 World Cup season standings.

== Records ==
While the IOC does not consider bobsled times eligible for Olympic records, the FIBT does maintain records for both the start and a complete run at each track it competes.

The start and track records were set at the test event for the 2010 Games on 6 February 2009.

Type	Date	Team	Time
Start	6 February 2009	United States; Erin Pac; Michelle Rzepka	5.17
Track	6 February 2009	United States; Shauna Rohbock; Elana Meyers	53.53

== Qualifying teams ==
On 20 January 2010, the FIBT announced that the following teams had qualified for the 2010 Games: This was finalized on 26 January 2010.

Three teams

- Germany and United States.

Two teams

- Canada, Switzerland, Great Britain, and Russia.

One team

- Netherlands, Italy, Belgium, Romania, Ireland, Japan, and Australia

Australia was added following a 9 February 2010 Court of Arbitration for Sport decision for inclusion of them in the two-woman event in the wake of the exclusion of Oceania from the event. In the meantime, Australia recommended that Ireland remain in the event.

== Practice ==
Supplemental training was offered on 19 February 2010 to both the two-woman and four-man bobsleigh events out of caution and further preparation for both events that would take place the following week. American bobsledder Shona Rohbock expressed concerns on the 19th that the track could generate speeds that are too dangerous for racing. She stated that she had never experienced speeds at even bobsleigh track she had experienced, event at the St. Moritz track. Officials had told Rohbock that they are considering sanding the runners to slow down the sleds to slow down the speeds. Elana Meyers, an American brakewoman, commented on Twitter that same day that "We (referring to her and her driver Erin Pac) went 145 km/h (90 mph).. that's fast!" Assistant Coach of the US Team, Scott Argir, was also on record about the abnormalities of the track. One crash occurred on the 19th for the two-woman event when Dutch bobsledder Esme Kamphuis crashed out in the final corners of the track.

Minor changes were made to the track on 22 February 2010 after bobsleigh four-man teams from Latvia and Croatia rolled over in supplementary training. Following a meeting with 11 team captains, training runs were postponed by the FIBT until later that day to adjust the shape of turn 11 so it would be easier for sleds to get through the rest of the track without crashing. FIBT spokesman Don Krone stated that "...some drivers have been experiencing difficulties transitioning from turn 11 to turn 12." As a result, Krone stated that "The FIBT track commission, in conjunction with VANOC and with advice from a number of team captains, are working on the shape of turn 11 to make it easier for drivers to get high enough on 11 to turn 12 so that they can successfully make it through turn 13." Krone also stated that it was common that the profile of corners were changed when it was being used by other sliding disciplines (luge and skeleton).

== Results ==
The first two runs took place on 23 February at 17:00 PST and 18:00 PST. On 24 February, the final two runs took place at 17:00 PST and 18:15 PST.

Defending Olympic champion Kiriasis of Germany finished fourth. Meanwhile, defending world champion Minichiello's sled flipped over after turn 12 during the third run, but the British driver and her brakeman Cooke walked away from the crash at the finish line. Minichiello and Cooke decided not to start the final run. In the final run, Russia 2 crashed which kept them at their finishing position of 18th place. Germany 2's team of Martini and Logsch were in fourth place after the third run, but were disqualified after Martini crashed in turn 13, causing Logsch to be ejected from the sled. Test event winners Rohbock and Meyers of the United States, the defending world championship silver medalists, finished sixth and third, respectively. Humphries broke the start record for the first two runs and tied it in the third run while also breaking the track record during the first three runs. Pac had a bad final run, dropping the sled she and Meyers had from second to third. Upperton had the fastest time to move Canada 2 from third to second in the final run. It was the first Olympic medals for all of the top three finishers. Meyers was the first woman from the American state of Georgia to win a Winter Olympic medal.

TR = Track Record. Top finish in each run is in boldface.

Rank	Bib	Country	Athletes	Run 1	Run 2	Run 3	Run 4	Total	Behind
1st place, gold medalist(s)	2	Canada (CAN-1)	Kaillie Humphries; Heather Moyse	**53.19**-TR	**53.01**-TR	**52.85**-TR	53.23	3:32.28	—N/a
2nd place, silver medalist(s)	5	Canada (CAN-2)	Helen Upperton; Shelley-Ann Brown	53.50	53.12	53.34	**53.17**	3:33.13	+0.85
3rd place, bronze medalist(s)	6	United States (USA-2)	Erin Pac; Elana Meyers	53.28	53.05	53.29	53.78	3:33.40	+1.12
4	1	Germany (GER-1)	Sandra Kiriasis; Christin Senkel	53.41	53.23	53.58	53.59	3:33.81	+1.53
5	9	United States (USA-3)	Bree Schaaf; Emily Azevedo	53.76	53.33	53.56	53.40	3:34.05	+1.77
6	4	United States (USA-1)	Shauna Rohbock; Michelle Rzepka	53.73	53.36	53.53	53.44	3:34.06	+1.78
7	7	Germany (GER-3)	Claudia Schramm; Janine Tischer	53.65	53.57	53.81	53.65	3:34.68	+2.40
8	11	Netherlands (NED-1)	Esme Kamphuis; Tine Veenstra	53.81	53.59	54.09	53.65	3:35.14	+2.86
9	14	Russia (RUS-1)	Anastasia Skulkina; Elena Doronina	54.38	53.64	54.08	53.83	3:35.93	+3.65
10	12	Switzerland (SUI-2)	Fabienne Meyer; Hanne Schenk	54.04	54.27	54.00	53.82	3:36.13	+3.85
11	13	Great Britain (GBR-2)	Paula Walker; Kelly Thomas	54.19	53.58	54.47	53.94	3:36.18	+3.90
12	8	Switzerland (SUI-1)	Sabina Hafner; Caroline Spahni	54.18	54.70	53.87	54.09	3:36.84	+4.56
13	16	Italy (ITA-1)	Jessica Gillarduzzi; Laura Curione	54.15	54.37	54.40	54.11	3:37.03	+4.75
14	18	Belgium (BEL-1)	Elfje Willemsen; Eva Willemarck	54.27	54.40	54.64	54.17	3:37.48	+5.20
15	17	Romania (ROU-1)	Carmen Radenovic; Alina Vera Savin	54.41	54.46	54.82	54.58	3:38.27	+5.99
16	20	Japan (JPN-1)	Manami Hino; Konomi Asazu	54.64	54.78	54.65	54.31	3:38.38	+6.10
17	19	Ireland (IRL-1)	Aoife Hoey; Claire Bergin	55.04	54.49	54.73	54.58	3:38.84	+6.56
18	15	Russia (RUS-2)	Olga Fedorova; Yulia Timofeeva	54.40	55.21	54.40	57.39	3:41.40	+9.12
19	21	Australia (AUS-1)	Astrid Loch-Wilkinson; Cecilia McIntosh	54.85	54.66	55.16		2:44.67	
	10	Great Britain (GBR-1)	Nicola Minichiello; Gillian Cooke	53.85	53.73	55.87	DNS		
	3	Germany (GER-2)	Cathleen Martini; Romy Logsch	53.28	53.32	53.39	DSQ		
