= IBSF World Championships 2025 – Monobob =

Monobob at the IBSF World Championships 2025
- Venue: Mt. Van Hoevenberg Olympic Bobsled Run
- Location: Lake Placid, United States
- Dates: 8–9 March
- Competitors: 21 from 15 nations
- Winning time: 3:57.82

Medalists
gold medal	Kaysha Love	United States
silver medal	Laura Nolte	Germany
bronze medal	Elana Meyers Taylor	United States

The Monobob competition at the IBSF World Championships 2025 was held on 8 and 9 March 2025.

== Results ==
The first two runs were started on 8 March at 14:04. The final two runs were started on 9 March at 15:30.

Rank	Bib	Athlete	Country	Run 1	Rank	Run 2	Rank	Run 3	Rank	Run 4	Rank	Total	Behind
1st place, gold medalist(s)	5	Kaysha Love	United States	59.50	1	59.49	3	59.49	3	59.34	1	3:57.82	
2nd place, silver medalist(s)	2	Laura Nolte	Germany	59.65	2	59.59	5	59.41	1	59.61	4	3:58.26	+0.44
3rd place, bronze medalist(s)	8	Elana Meyers Taylor	United States	59.69	4	59.57	4	59.46	2	59.59	3	3:58.31	+0.49
4	7	Cynthia Appiah	Canada	59.88	7	59.40	2	59.60	5	59.65	5	3:58.53	+0.71
5	1	Lisa Buckwitz	Germany	59.84	6	59.65	6	59.63	6	59.48	2	3:58.60	+0.78
6	10	Katrin Beierl	Austria	59.69	4	59.32	1	59.86	7	59.82	7	3:58.69	+0.87
7	17	Kristen Bujnowski	Canada	59.67	3	59.75	8	59.52	4	59.83	8	3:58.77	+0.95
8	11	Kaillie Armbruster Humphries	United States	59.90	9	59.87	9	59.95	8	59.78	6	3:59.50	+1.68
9	3	Breeana Walker	Australia	59.97	11	59.74	7	1:00.02	10	59.85	9	3:59.58	+1.76
10	4	Kim Kalicki	Germany	1:00.20	14	59.91	11	59.98	9	1:00.02	10	4:00.11	+2.29
11	14	Margot Boch	France	59.89	8	59.94	12	1:00.02	10	1:00.34	14	4:00.19	+2.37
12	9	Andreea Grecu	Romania	59.93	10	1:00.04	14	1:00.20	14	1:00.03	11	4:00.20	+2.38
13	12	Debora Annen	Switzerland	1:00.14	12	59.90	10	1:00.11	12	1:00.11	12	4:00.26	+2.44
14	13	Melissa Lotholz	Canada	1:00.18	13	59.95	13	1:00.18	13	1:00.11	12	4:00.42	+2.60
15	20	Kim Yoo-ran	South Korea	1:00.49	15	1:00.69	17	1:00.43	15	1:00.51	15	4:02.12	+4.30
16	15	Adele Nicoll	Great Britain	1:00.60	16	1:00.47	15	1:00.76	16	1:00.91	17	4:02.74	+4.92
17	16	Patrícia Tajcnárová	Czech Republic	1:01.17	17	1:00.48	16	1:00.93	18	1:00.88	16	4:03.46	+5.64
18	22	Leanna García	Spain	1:01.52	19	1:01.04	18	1:00.83	17	1:01.18	18	4:04.57	+6.75
19	21	Lin Sin-rong	Chinese Taipei	1:01.20	18	1:01.11	19	1:01.14	19	1:01.43	19	4:04.88	+7.06
20	19	Adanna Johnson	Jamaica	1:01.70	21	1:01.44	20	1:01.14	19	1:01.57	20	4:05.85	+8.03
21	18	Agnese Campeol	Thailand	1:01.61	20	1:01.56	21	1:01.51	21	Did not start			
	6	Melanie Hasler	Switzerland	Did not start									
