= IBSF World Championships 2023 – Monobob =

Monobob at the IBSF World Championships 2023
- Venue: St. Moritz-Celerina Olympic Bobrun
- Location: St. Moritz, Switzerland
- Dates: 28-29 January
- Competitors: 20 from 11 nations
- Winning time: 4:44.85

Medalists
gold medal	Laura Nolte	Germany
silver medal	Kaillie Humphries	United States
bronze medal	Lisa Buckwitz	Germany

The Monobob competition at the IBSF World Championships 2023 was held on 28 and 29 January 2023.

== Results ==
The first two runs are started on 28 January at 09:00 and on 29 January at 10:00.

Rank	Bib	Athlete	Country	Run 1	Rank	Run 2	Rank	Run 3	Rank	Run 4	Rank	Total	Behind
1st place, gold medalist(s)	9	Laura Nolte	Germany	1:11.25	1	1:10.96	1	1:11.42	1	1:11.22	4	4:44.85	
2nd place, silver medalist(s)	10	Kaillie Humphries	United States	1:11.25	1	1:11.23	3	1:11.63	2	1:11.14	2	4:45.25	+0.40
3rd place, bronze medalist(s)	4	Lisa Buckwitz	Germany	1:11.66	4	1:11.04	2	1:11.69	3	1:11.18	3	4:45.57	+0.72
4	3	Breeana Walker	Australia	1:11.59	3	1:11.24	4	1:11.70	4	1:11.24	5	4:45.77	+0.92
5	7	Kim Kalicki	Germany	1:11.89	8	1:11.70	6	1:11.87	5	1:11.11	1	4:46.57	+1.72
6	8	Cynthia Appiah	Canada	1:11.86	7	1:11.65	5	1:12.00	7	1:11.27	6	4:46.78	+1.93
7	6	Melanie Hasler	Switzerland	1:11.75	5	1:11.81	7	1:11.95	6	1:11.50	8	4:47.01	+2.16
8	14	Maureen Zimmer	Germany	1:11.80	6	1:11.91	8	1:12.10	9	1:11.36	7	4:47.17	+2.32
9	5	Bianca Ribi	Canada	1:12.35	10	1:12.25	9	1:12.07	8	1:11.74	9	4:48.41	+3.56
10	17	Martina Fontanive	Switzerland	1:12.32	9	1:12.27	10	1:12.46	10	1:11.77	10	4:48.82	+3.97
11	15	Huai Mingming	China	1:12.63	12	1:12.37	11	1:12.69	12	1:11.99	11	4:49.68	+4.83
12	13	Viktória Čerňanská	Slovakia	1:12.69	13	1:12.49	12	1:12.51	11	1:12.15	12	4:49.84	+4.99
13	19	Margot Boch	France	1:12.55	11	1:12.63	13	1:12.79	13	1:12.30	13	4:50.27	+5.42
14	11	Andreea Grecu	Romania	1:13.00	14	1:12.81	14	1:13.02	15	1:12.34	14	4:51.17	+6.32
15	20	Giada Andreutti	Italy	1:13.07	15	1:12.90	15	1:13.38	16	1:12.40	15	4:51.75	+6.90
16	16	Georgeta Popescu	Romania	1:13.24	16	1:13.38	16	1:12.94	14	1:13.46	18	4:53.02	+8.17
17	2	Nicole Vogt	United States	1:13.39	17	1:13.55	17	1:13.72	19	1:12.95	16	4:53.61	+8.76
18	18	Linda Weiszewski	Poland	1:13.61	18	1:13.91	18	1:13.56	18	1:13.32	17	4:54.40	+9.55
19	12	Riley Compton	United States	1:13.94	19	1:13.92	19	1:13.48	17	1:13.53	19	4:54.87	+10.02
	1	Ying Qing	China	1:22.38	20	Did not start							
