= Tüchi =

Tüchi or Tuchi is a surname. Notable people with the surname include:

- Alexandra Tüchi (born 1983), Austrian bobsledder
- John J. Tuchi (born 1964), American lawyer
