= Baadsvik =

Baadsvik is a Norwegian surname. Notable people with the surname include:

- Emily Baadsvik (born 1983), Canadian bobsledder
- Karl Johan Baadsvik (1910–1995), Canadian skier
- Øystein Baadsvik (born 1966), Norwegian classical tubist
