= 2017 Austrian Athletics Championships =

- Dates: 8–9 July 2017
- Host city: Linz, Austria
- Venue: Linzer Stadion
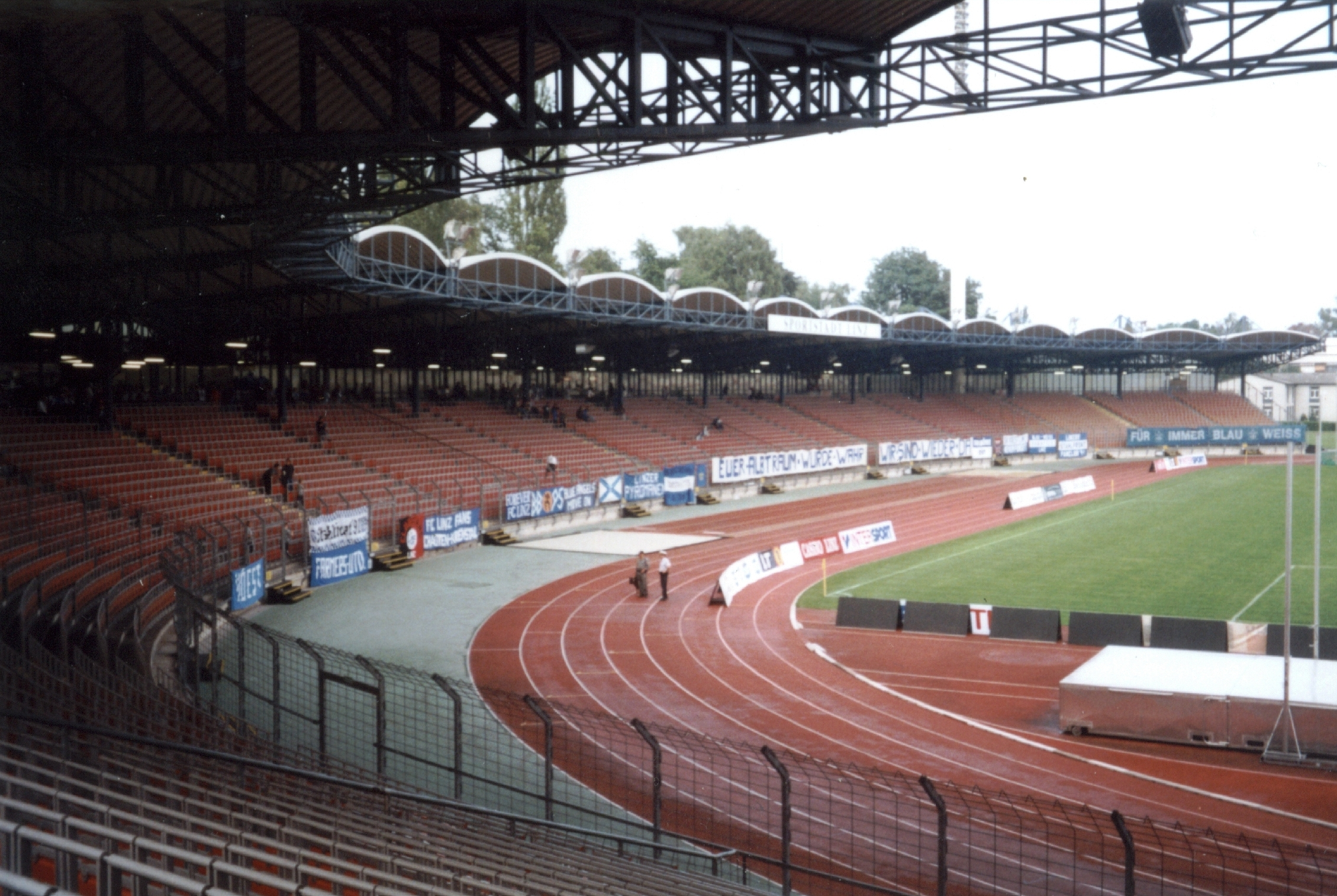

The 2017 Austrian Athletics Championships (German: Österreichische Staatsmeisterschaften in der Leichtathletik 2017) was the year's national championship in outdoor track and field for Austria. It was held on 8 and 9 July at the Linzer Stadion in Linz. It served as the selection meeting for Austria at the 2017 World Championships in Athletics.

== Results ==
=== Men ===
| Event | Gold | | Silver | | Bronze | |
|---|---|---|---|---|---|---|
| 100 metres | Markus Fuchs | 10.45 | Christoph Haslauer | 10.78 | Maximilian Münzker | 10.96 |
| 200 metres | Markus Fuchs | 21.23 | Dominik Hufnagl | 21.56 | Mario Gebhardt | 21.65 |
| 400 metres | Dominik Hufnagl | 47.06 | Mario Gebhardt | 47.56 | Markus Kornfeld | 47.98 |
| 800 metres | Dominik Stadlmann | 1:53.51 | Paul Stüger | 1:54.34 | Maximilian Trummer | 1:54.57 |
| 1500 metres | Andreas Vojta | 3:50.81 | Brenton Rowe | 3:52.56 | Maximilian Trummer | 3:53.39 |
| 5000 metres | Andreas Vojta | 14:33.76 | Brenton Rowe | 14:39.32 | Stephan Listabarth | 14:48.03 |
| 110 m hurdles | Florian Domenig | 14.45 | Martin Kainrath | 14.55 | Julian Eß | 15.24 |
| 400 m hurdles | Markus Kornfeld | 51.59 | Tobias Müller | 53.02 | Markus Karlin | 54.64 |
| 4 × 100 m relay | ULC - Riverside Mödling; Levin Gottl; Markus Fuchs; Andreas Meyer; Samuel Szihn | 41.12 | SVS-Leichtathletik; Michael Szalay; Felix Einramhof; Dominik Hufnagl; David Markovic | 42.17 | DSG Volksbank Wien; Ali Tastepe; Andreas Unger; Florian Domenig; Lukas Weilharter | 42.62 |
| High jump | Alexander Dengg | 2.00 | Andreas Steinmetz | 1.97 | David Kleinheinz | 1.94 |
| Pole vault | Sebastian Ender | 5.05 | Florian Matzi | 4.95 | Riccardo Klotz | 4.95 |
| Long jump | Julian Kellerer | 7.75 | Samuel Szihn | 7.03 | Dominik Distelberger | 6.96 |
| Triple jump | Roman Schmied | 15.91 | Julian Kellerer | 15.82 | Philipp Kronsteiner | 15.42 |
| Shot put | Georg Stamminger | 15.45 | Gerhard Zillner | 15.21 | Alexander Lang | 14.37 |
| Discus throw | Marco Cozzoli | 45.60 | Armin Beham | 42.88 | Johannes Pichler | 41.77 |
| Hammer throw | Marco Cozzoli | 61.91 | Matthias Hayek | 59.87 | Michael Hofer | 53.85 |
| Javelin throw | Matthias Kaserer | 62.04 | Martin Strasser | 60.46 | Adam Wiener | 58.83 |
| 3 × 1000 m relay | ATSV ÖMV Auersthal; Julian Schlosser; Fabian Wolfram; Lukas Stuchetz | 8:18.80 | LAC Klagenfurt; Johannes Striednig; Morgan Schusser; Florian Herbst | 8:18.83 | LTV Köflach; Tobias Ofner; Felix Geieregger; David Affortunati | 8:28.34 |

=== Women ===
| Event | Gold | | Silver | | Bronze | |
|---|---|---|---|---|---|---|
| 100 metres | Viola Kleiser | 11.52 | Alexandra Toth | 11.67 | Savannah Mapalagama | 11.97 |
| 200 metres | Viola Kleiser | 23.66 | Ivona Dadic | 23.69 | Susanne Walli | 24.18 |
| 400 metres | Susanne Walli | 54.39 | Carina Schrempf | 56.21 | Julia Schwarzinger | 56.69 |
| 800 metres | Carina Schrempf | 2:13.39 | Laura Ripfel | 2:14.28 | Cornelia Wohlfahrt | 2:14.35 |
| 1500 metres | Anna Baumgartner | 4:48.16 | Cornelia Wohlfahrt | 4:50.52 | Ylva Traxler | 4:50.70 |
| 5000 metres | Julia Mayer | 17:48.70 | Katharina Kreundl | 17:48.72 | Jasmin Zweimüller | 19:03.09 |
| 100 m hurdles | Beate Schrott | 13.43 | Eva Wimberger | 13.72 | Yvonne Zapfel | 13.92 |
| 400 m hurdles | Lena Pressler | 61.61 | Magdalena Baur | 63.02 | Thea Grubesic | 63.62 |
| 4 × 100 m relay | UNION St.Pölten; Eva Wimberger; Viola Kleiser; Beate Schrott; Ivona Dadic | 45.91 | TGW Zehnkampf-Union; Julia Schwarzinger; Sarah Lagger; Susanne Walli; Johanna Plank | 46.50 | ULC Linz Oberbank; Linda Hinterreiter; Katharina Taitl; Lisa Wiesmayr; Jana Schnabel | 49.21 |
| High jump | Ekaterina Krasovskiy | 1.83 | Ivona Dadic | 1.83 | Idia Ohenhen | 1.74 |
| Pole vault | Brigitta Hesch | 4.15 | Agnes Hodi | 4.05 | Katrin Preiner | 3.50 |
| Long jump | Sarah Lagger | 6.28 | Karin Strametz | 6.19 | Ingeborg Grünwald | 6.05 |
| Triple jump | Michaela Egger | 12.80 | Magdalena Macht | 12.41 | Catina JoAhrer | 11.86 |
| Shot put | Ivona Dadic | 14.44 | Djeneba Touré | 14.08 | Christina Scheffauer | 13.55 |
| Discus throw | Veronika Watzek | 51.51 | Djeneba Touré | 47.40 | Jordana Kakifukiamoko | 44.80 |
| Hammer throw | Christina Scheffauer | 53.58 | Bettina Weber | 52.91 | Jacqueline Röbl | 51.87 |
| Javelin throw | Victoria Hudson | 47.84 | Sarah Lagger | 44.36 | Magdalena Dielacher | 43.37 |
| 3 × 800 m relay | TS Bregenz-Vorkloster; Jennifer Paulic; Lisa Posch; Anna Mager | 7:18.43 | KSV alutechnik Lotte Luise Seiler; Lara Maggele; Maureen Wundsam | 7:23.11 | SVS-Leichtathletik; Samantha Jany; Carolin Sobotka; Adriana Höller | 7:30.48 |
