= Heather Moyse =

Canadian multi-sport athlete

Heather Moyse OPEI
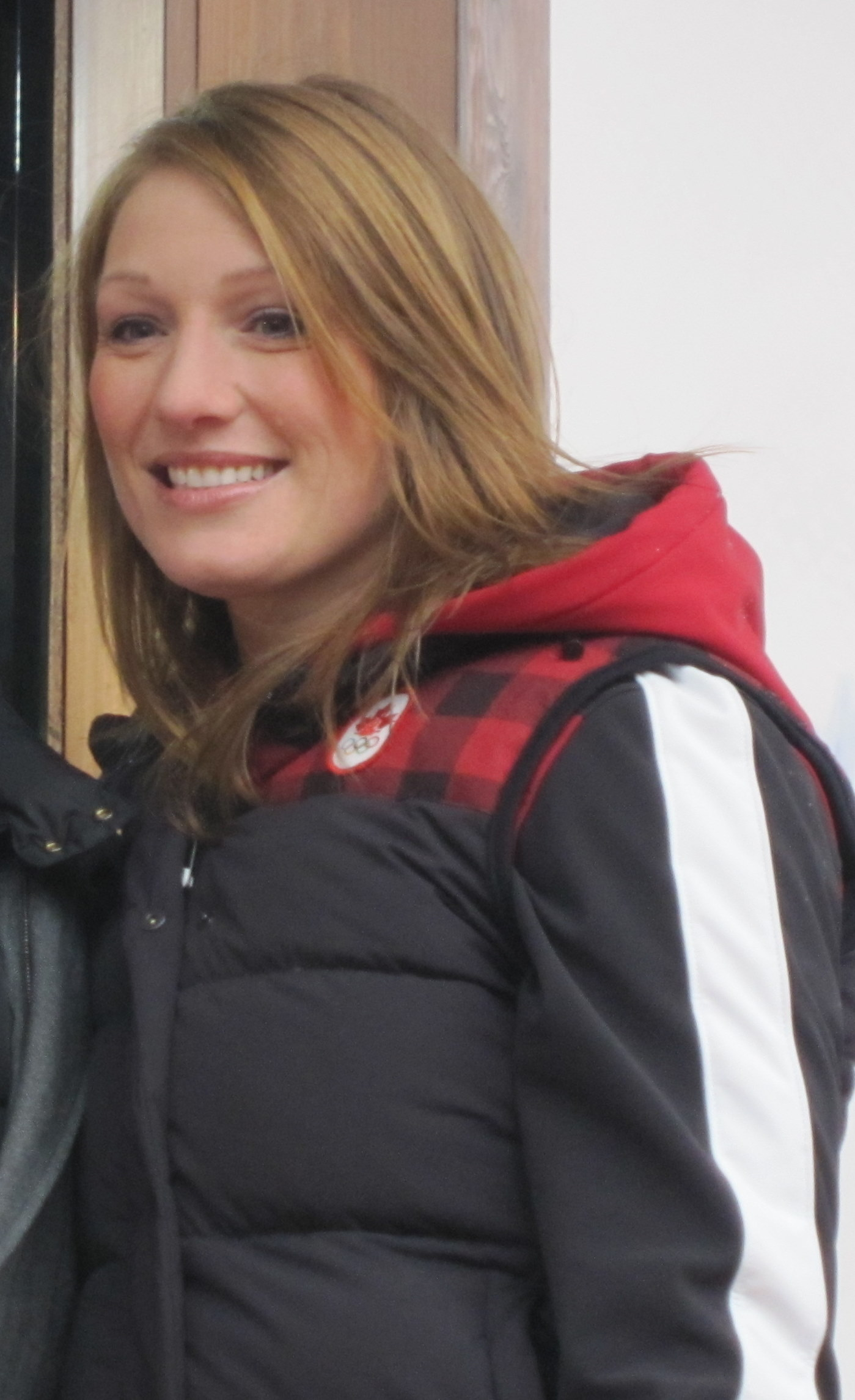
- Moyse in Vancouver 2010

Personal information
- Nationality: Canadian
- Born: July 23, 1978 (age 47) Summerside, Prince Edward Island, Canada
- Education: University of Waterloo
- Height: 1.79 m (5 ft 10 1/2 in)
- Weight: 72.5 kg (160 lb; 11.42 st)
- Website: Official website

Sport
- Country: Canada
- Sport: Bobsleigh
- Event: 2-woman

Achievements and titles
- Olympic finals: 1st place, gold medalist(s)
Medal record
Women's Bobsleigh
Representing Canada
Olympic Games
Gold medal – first place	2010 Vancouver	Two-woman
Gold medal – first place	2014 Sochi	Two-woman
World Championships
Bronze medal – third place	2011 Königssee	Two-woman
Bronze medal – third place	2011 Königssee	Mixed team
Women's rugby sevens
Representing Canada
World Cup 7s
Silver medal – second place	2013 Russia	Team competition

Heather Moyse OPEI (born July 23, 1978) is a Canadian athlete and two-time Olympic gold medalist, representing Canada in international competition as a bobsledder, rugby union player, and track cyclist and competing at the Canadian intercollegiate level in rugby, soccer and track and field.

== Awards ==
Moyse was a two-time Female Athlete of the Year at Three Oaks Senior High School in Summerside, Prince Edward Island where she competed in soccer, basketball, rugby and track and field. A graduate of the University of Waterloo kinesiology program, she was inducted into that school's Sports Hall of Fame in 2002. Moyse received the Lieutenant-Governor's Award as P.E.I.'s outstanding athlete in 2006 and 2010, was named Prince Edward Island's Senior Female Athlete of the Year for 2005, 2006 and 2010 and has won ten Sport P.E.I. awards in total since 1998 . In 2010, Moyse and bobsled pilot Kaillie Humphries were nominated as Sportswoman of the Year by the American Women's Sports Foundation in the Team category. Heather also received the 2010 University of Waterloo Faculty of Applied Health Sciences Young Alumni Award. On April 14, 2011, she was named 2010 Ontario Female Athlete of the Year, making her one of the only, if not the only, athletes to win the same award in two provinces in the same year. In 2012, she was named by Sportsnet Magazine as one of the 30 Most Beautiful Athletes on the Planet. In 2014, she was a recipient of the Order of Prince Edward Island.

== Bobsleigh ==
In 2005–2006, her rookie bobsleigh season, Moyse and her partner Helen Upperton won the Canadian Championships and earned four medals on the World Cup circuit including a gold at an event in St. Moritz, Switzerland. Heather also set push start records on five international tracks. At the 2006 Winter Olympics, Moyse and Upperton finished in fourth place in the two-man bobsleigh event, missing bronze by five one-hundredths of a second behind the host Italian team. The pair set the push start record for the Olympic track with a 5.16-second start time in their first heat.

After a one-year absence due to educational commitments, Moyse returned to the World Cup circuit in 2007–2008 as one of two brakeman for Canada 1 pilot Helen Upperton. In four races the duo earned a silver, bronze and two 5th-place finishes. At the 2008 World Championships in Altenberg, Germany, Moyse raced with Canada 3 pilot Lisa Szabon and the pair finished in 11th place.

During the 2008–2009 World Cup season, Moyse returned from a serious shoulder injury (incurred while playing rugby for Canada). In her only race with Canada 1 pilot Upperton the duo won gold in Igls, Austria. Moyse and Canada 2 pilot Kaillie Humphries recorded a 5th in St. Moritz, silver in Whistler and 5th at the 2009 World Championships in Lake Placid, New York. In four other races, Moyse did not race with any of Canada's three sleds.

During the 2009–2010 World Cup season, Moyse & Humphries finished second overall behind only Sandra Kiriasis and won four medals including gold in Altenberg, Germany. They set or tied the track start record in every race in which they competed together.

She won a gold medal in the Two-woman competition at the 2010 Winter Olympics with Kaillie Humphries. The silver medal was won by fellow Canadians Shelley-Ann Brown and Helen Upperton. It marked the first time at the 2010 Olympics that Canadians had won two medals in one event. For winning the gold medal, Moyse was on the cover of Hello! Canada in March 2010. Moyse joins former University of Toronto student-athlete Jayna Hefford as the only University of Toronto graduates to claim a gold medal at the 2010 Vancouver Winter Games.

Moyse missed the first half of the 2010–11 World Cup bobsleigh season due to an ankle injury suffered in the final game of the 2010 Women's Rugby World Cup.

Moyse returned to the Canadian Bobsleigh Team in the fall of 2013, earning a spot as the top brakeman on the 2014 Canadian Olympic team. Heather and Kaillie Humphries repeated as Olympic gold medallists at the 2014 Sochi Olympics, pulling ahead of rival USA 1, piloted by Elana Meyers and braked by Lauryn Williams, on the final run of the four-heat competition. The pair became only the third Canadian Winter Olympians to repeat as gold medalists in a non-team sport and the only female gold medalists from the Vancouver Olympics to repeat as gold medalists in Sochi. Humphries and Moyse were also selected by the Canadian Olympic Committee as Canada's flagbearers in the closing ceremonies.

Moyse retired from bobsleigh after the 2014 Olympics, however a couple of months before the start of the 2017–18 season she decided to return to the sport after push athlete-turned-pilot Alysia Rissling contacted her about it in August 2017, having turned down the opportunity to return to competition with Humphries the previous year. With Rissling as driver, the pair finished 6th in the two-woman bobsleigh event representing Canada at the 2018 Winter Olympics.

=== Start records ===
Leading up to the 2010 Winter Olympics, Moyse held or had tied nine track start records with either Kaillie Humphries or Helen Upperton, including every track on the 2009–2010 World Cup circuit. Three of those records have since been broken. Moyse also won the 2013 World Push Championships, held in Calgary, Alberta, Canada in November 2013. Start records held by Heather Moyse:.

- Calgary – 5.45 in Nov 2013 with Kaillie Humphries
- Cesana – 5.16 at 2006 Olympics with Helen Upperton (tied by Kaillie Humphries and Shelley-Ann Brown in 2009)
- Park City – 5.20 in 2009 with Kaillie Humphries, current record of 5.10 held by Elana Meyers and Aja Evans of the USA
- Lake Placid – 5.46 in 2009 with Kaillie Humphries, current non-World Cup record held by Elana Meyers and Aja Evans of the USA
- Winterberg – 5.51 in 2014 with Kaillie Humphries
- Altenberg – 5.74 in 2009 with Kaillie Humphries
- Königssee – 5.25 in 2010 with Kaillie Humphries, current record 5.20 in 2013 by Elana Meyers and Aja Evans of the USA
- Igls – 5.50 in Jan 2010 with Kaillie Humphries
- Whistler – 5.11 twice at 2010 Olympics with Kaillie Humphries, tied by Elana Meyers and Lolo Jones in Nov 2012, non-World Cup record broken again by Humphries and Moyse with a 5.07 start at 2013 Canadian Championships held in October 2013

=== Career highlights ===
Olympics
2006 – Torino, 4th with Helen Upperton
2010 – Vancouver, (gold) 1st with Kaillie Humphries
2014 – Sochi, (gold) 1st with Kaillie Humphries
World Championships
2008 – Altenberg, 11th with Lisa Szabon
2009 – Lake Placid, 5th with Kaillie Humphries
2011 – Königssee, (bronze) 3rd with Kaillie Humphries
2011 – Königssee, (bronze) 3rd with Kaillie Humphries (team event)
World Cup
2005 – Calgary, (bronze) 3rd with Helen Upperton
2005 – Igls, (silver) 2nd with Helen Upperton
2006 – Königssee, (silver) 2nd with Helen Upperton
2006 – St. Moritz, (gold) 1st with Helen Upperton
2008 – Cortina d'Ampezzo, (silver) 2nd with Helen Upperton
2008 – St. Moritz, (bronze) 3rd with Helen Upperton
2008 – Igls, (gold) 1st with Helen Upperton
2009 – Whistler, (silver) 2nd with Kaillie Humphries
2009 – Lake Placid, (bronze) 3rd with Kaillie Humphries
2009 – Altenberg, (gold) 1st with Kaillie Humphries
2010 – Königssee, (silver) 2nd with Kaillie Humphries
2010 – Igls, (bronze) 3rd with Kaillie Humphries
2013 – Calgary, (gold) 1st with Kaillie Humphries
2013 – Park City, (silver) 2nd with Kaillie Humphries
2013 – Lake Placid, (gold) 1st with Kaillie Humphries
2014 – St. Moritz, (gold) 1st with Kaillie Humphries

== Rugby union ==
Moyse represented Canada's national rugby team at both the 2006 and 2010 Women's Rugby World Cup. Moyse is considered one of the best fullbacks in the game. She has also been a member of the Canadian national women's sevens team and represented Canada at the 2013 Rugby World Cup Sevens in Moscow, winning a silver medal. At the 2010 Women's Rugby World Cup in England, where Canada finished sixth, Moyse and tournament most valuable player Carla Hohepa of New Zealand tied as the leading try scorers with seven tries each.

At the 2008 Hong Kong Sevens tournament, Moyse was the leading scorer in the women's tournament with 11 tries in just 4 matches, including three in Canada's semifinal win over Kazakhstan and Canada's only try in their 21–7 final loss to the United States. At the 2006 Women's Rugby World Cup in Edmonton, Alberta, where Canada finished fourth, Moyse was Canada's only tournament all-star and the overall leading scorer in the tournament in terms of both points and tries with 35 points and 7 tries in five matches.

Moyse also starred in the CIS, now known as U Sports. At the University of Waterloo, where she earned a Bachelor of Science in Honours Kinesiology, Moyse was selected as team Rookie of the Year and Most Valuable Player, a three time CIS All Canadian and was an integral part of a team that won the OUA Silver medal and the first ever CIAU Bronze medal for Waterloo. At the University of Toronto, where she completed a Master's Degree in occupational therapy, Moyse led the Varsity Blues rugby team to the 2004 CIS national final where she was a tournament all-star and was again named a first-team All-Canadian during her fifth and final year of eligibility.

=== Honours and recognition ===
In 2016, she was inducted into the World Rugby Hall of Fame at a ceremony that also marked the opening of the Hall's first-ever physical location in Rugby. She was the first Canadian woman and the second Canadian overall, after Gareth Rees, to be inducted into the Hall of Fame.

- 2006, the only Canadian on the Rugby World Cup All-World team
- 2006, World Cup tournament leading tryscorer (7 tries)
- Named to the All-Canadian CIS team three times

== Cycling ==
In 2012, Moyse represented Canada in her third international sport when she competed in the Pan-American Cycling championships in Argentina. Despite having only taken up the sports in 2011 and never having raced on an outdoor track, Moyse finished 4th in the 500m time trial at 36.207 seconds and fifth in the match sprint competition. In June 2012 Pro Cycling U.S. Grand Prix of Sprinting in Colorado Springs, Colorado.

== Track ==
Moyse represented Prince Edward Island as a sprinter at the 1997 Canada Games in Brandon, Manitoba and still holds the PEI Senior Ladies record in triple jump. She held the PEI Senior Ladies record in the 200m from 1996 until 2013. At the University of Waterloo, she competed for four years at the CIAU Championships and amassed ten OUA medals and 2 CIAU bronze medals in her career. During the 2000 OUA championship, Moyse won a 300M gold and 60M silver to lead Waterloo to a third-place medal and was named the OUA Track MVP. She also set five university track records, four of which stood as of September 2012. Moyse was named Waterloo's Track & Field and Overall Female Rookie of the Year in 1996–97 and Women's Track & Field Team MVP in 1997–98.

== Soccer ==
In 1996–97, Moyse played one year of varsity soccer for the University of Waterloo while also competing in track & field.

== Sponsorship ==
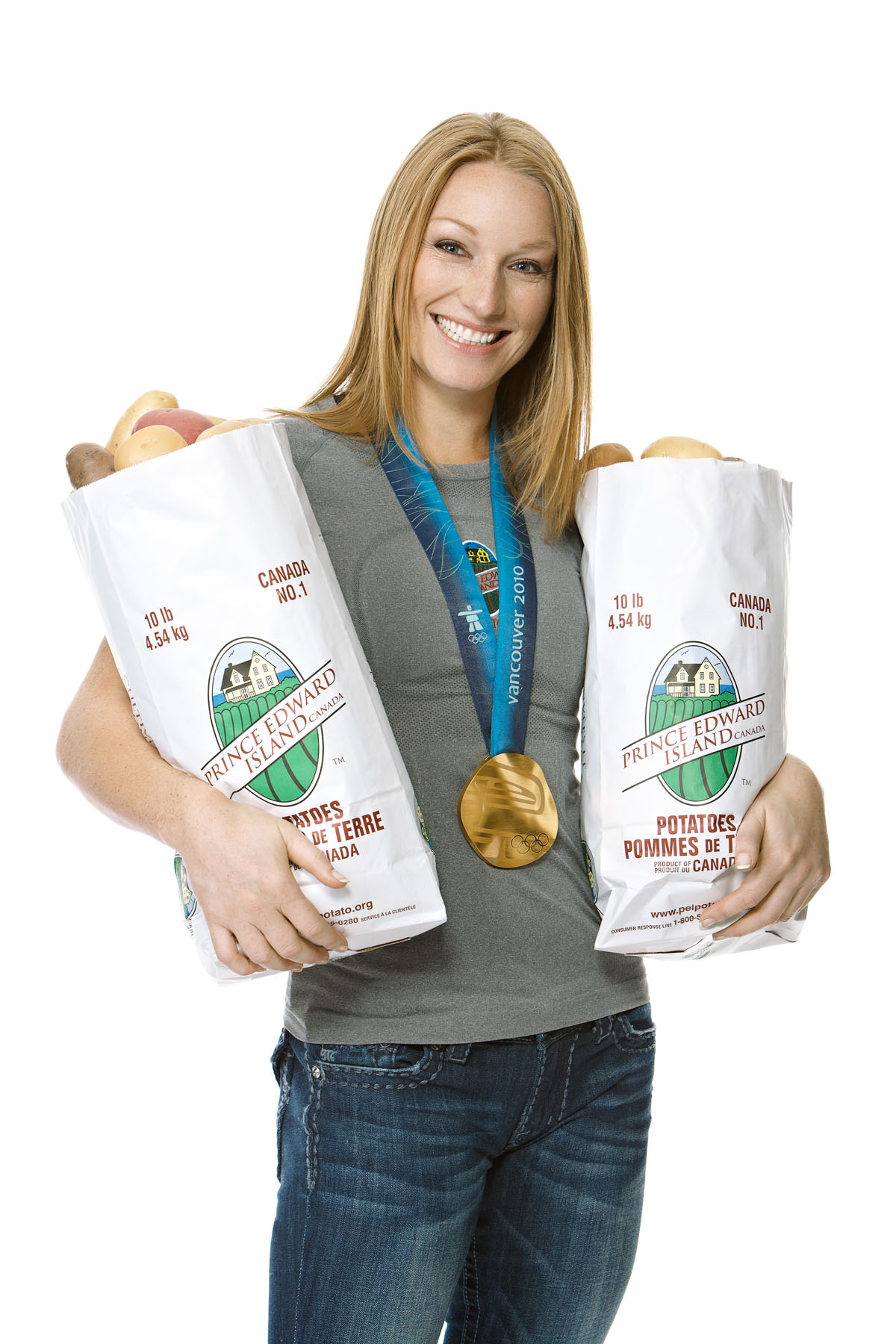
Heather Moyse, PEI Potatoes Brand Ambassador

Heather Moyse serves as a Brand Ambassador for Prince Edward Island Potatoes. In this role, she has represented the PEI potato industry at events and promoted potatoes through social media and conventional media.

== See also ==
- List of University of Waterloo people
