= Erin Pac =

American bobsledder (born 1980)

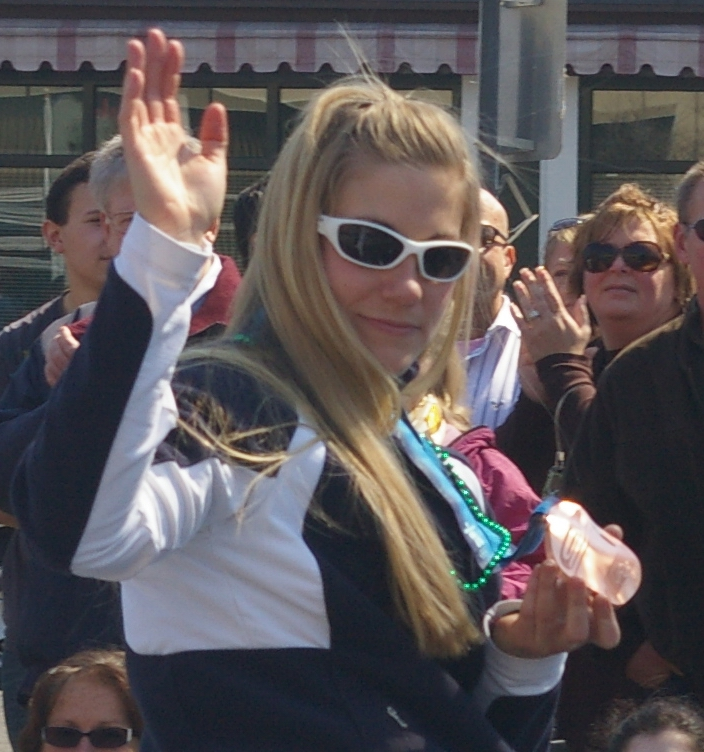
- Erin Pac, wearing the bronze medal she won at the 2010 Winter Olympics, waves to the crowd in the annual St. Patrick’s Day Parade in Milford, Connecticut.

Personal information
- Nationality: American
- Born: May 30, 1980 (age 46)

Sport
- Country: United States
- Sport: Bobsled
- Retired: 2010
Medal record
Bobsled
Representing the United States
Olympic Games
Bronze medal – third place	2010 Vancouver	Two-woman
World Championships
Silver medal – second place	2007 St. Moritz	Mixed team
Bronze medal – third place	2008 Altenberg	Mixed team

Erin Pac (born May 30, 1980) is an American former bobsledder who competed from 2002 to 2010. She won two medals in the mixed bobsled-skeleton team event at the FIBT World Championships with a silver in 2007 and a bronze in 2008.

A native of Farmington, Connecticut and now living in Milford, Connecticut, Pac earned a degree in rehabilitation and disabilities studies with a concentration in rehabilitation counseling from Springfield College in Massachusetts.

It was announced on 16 January 2010 that she made the US team for the 2010 Winter Olympics. Pac and brake-woman Elana Meyers won the bronze medal in the Two-Woman Bobsled Event on February 24, 2010. Their first run had a time of 53.28. They ran 53.05 in the second run. Their third and fourth run timed in at 53.29 and 53.78 respectively for a total of 3:33.40, 1.12 off the gold medal pace.

In November 2010, she announced her retirement from competitive sports.
