= Helen Upperton =

Canadian bobsledder

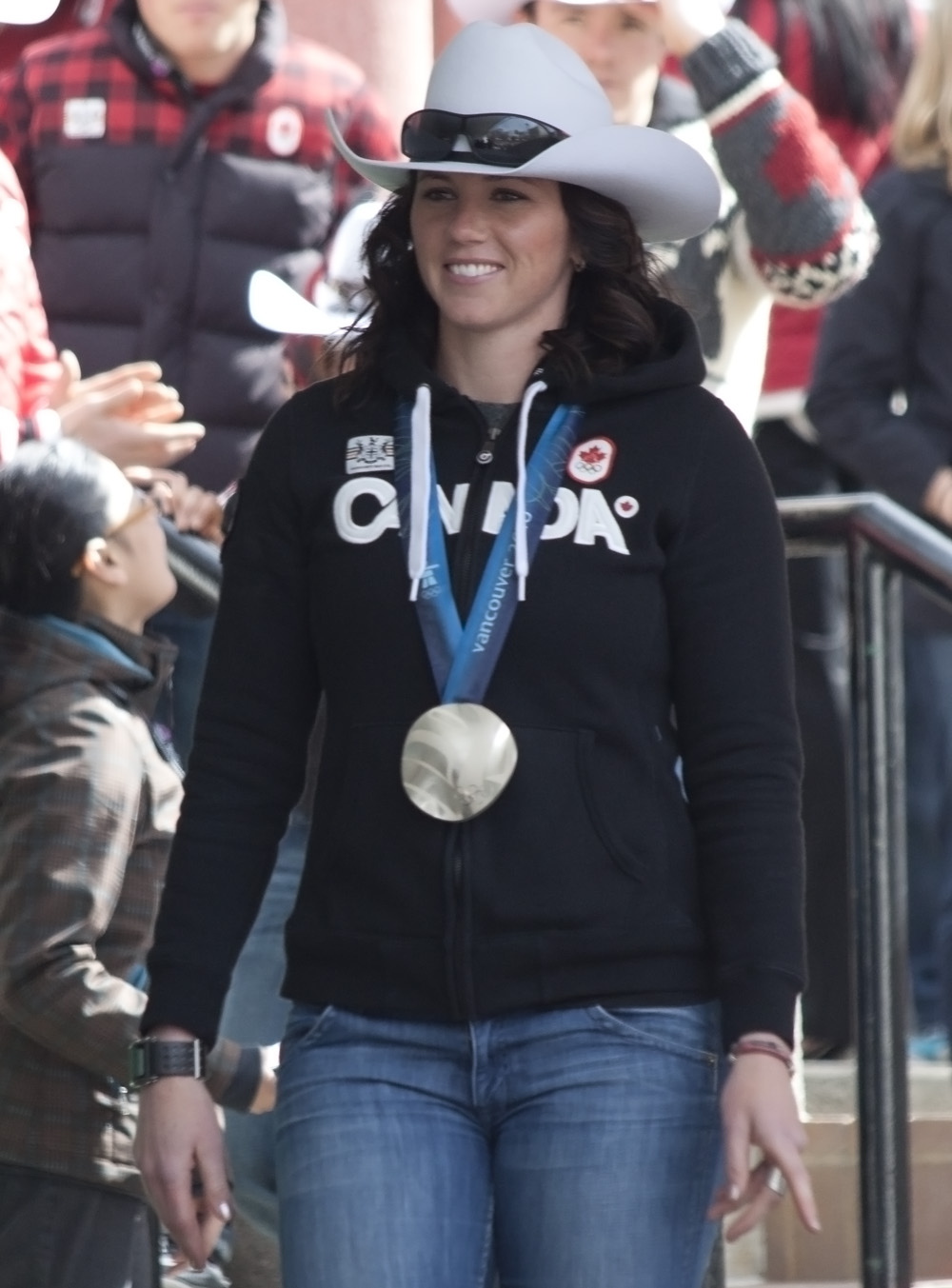
- Helen Upperton in Calgary (2010)

Personal information
- Full name: Helen Lesley Upperton
- Nationality: Canadian
- Born: October 31, 1979 (age 46) Ahmadi, Kuwait
- Height: 1.75 m (5 ft 9 in)
- Weight: 70 kg (154 lb; 11 st 0 lb)

Sport
- Country: Canada
- Sport: Bobsleigh
- Event: 2-woman
- Coached by: (Canada) Dennis Marineau, Tuffy LaTour, Bruno Mingeon

Achievements and titles
- Olympic finals: 2nd place, silver medalist(s)
Medal record
Women´s Bobsleigh
Representing Canada
Olympic Games
Silver medal – second place	2010 Vancouver	Two-woman
World Cup Championships
Silver medal – second place	2005-06	Two-woman
Bronze medal – third place	2007–08	Two-woman

Helen Lesley Upperton (born October 31, 1979) is a Canadian bobsledder who has competed since 2002. Upperton was born in Ahmadi, Kuwait as her parents involvement in the oil industry meant they traveled abroad. She holds dual citizenship of both Great Britain and Canada. Upperton won the silver medal at the 2010 Winter Olympics after previously finishing fourth in the two-woman event at the 2006 Winter Olympics in Turin. In 2020 Upperton won a Canadian Screen Award for “Best Sports Analyst” for her coverage of the Bobsleigh World Championship event with Mark Lee. She went to high school at Dr. E.P. Scarlett High School and graduated from the University of Texas in Austin with a BSc.

Upperton also competed in the FIBT World Championships, earning her best finish of fourth in the two-woman event at Altenberg in 2008. Her best overall Bobsleigh World Cup finish was second in the two-woman event in the 2005–06 season.

A former triple jumper at the University of Texas at Austin, Upperton moved to bobsleigh in 2002. In the 2005–06 season she won four medals on the World Cup including a gold at an event in St. Moritz, Switzerland, Canada's first women's World Cup win in bobsleigh. One month later she finished fourth in the two-woman event at the 2006 Winter Olympics. Upperton scored a total of six wins and over 20 podium finishes in World Cup competition.

She won a silver medal in the Two-woman competition at the 2010 Winter Olympics with Shelley-Ann Brown. The gold medal was won by fellow Canadians Kaillie Humphries and Heather Moyse. It marked the first time of the 2010 Olympics that Canadians had won two medals in one event.

Upperton and Brown announced their retirements from the sport in September 2012. After retiring Upperton became manager of community relations with WinSport Canada. Subsequently, she became head coach of WinSport Academy's bobsleigh programme, training developing bobsledders.

Upperton was a commentator for men's and women's bobsleigh and skeleton at the 2014 Winter Olympics and 2018 Winter Olympics with Mark Connolly.

== Career highlights ==
World Championships
2005 - Calgary, 12th with Jill Salus
2007 - St. Moritz, 6th with Jennifer Ciochetti
2008 - Altenberg, 4th with Jennifer Ciochetti
2009 - Lake Placid, 4th with Jennifer Ciochetti
2011 - Konigssee, 5th with Shelley-Ann Brown
World Cup
2005 - Calgary, (bronze) 3rd with Heather Moyse
2005 - Igls, (silver) 2nd with Heather Moyse

2006 - Königssee, (silver) nbn 2nd with Heather Moyse
2006 - St. Moritz, (gold) 1st with Heather Moyse
2006 - Park City, (bronze) 3rd with Jennifer Ciochetti
2006 - Lake Placid, (silver) 2nd with Jamie Cruickshank
2007 - Cortina d'Ampezzo, (bronze) 3rd with Jennifer Ciochetti
2007 - Calgary, (gold) 1st with Jennifer Ciochetti
2007 - Lake Placid, (silver) 2nd with Jennifer Ciochetti
2008 - Cortina d'Ampezzo, (silver) 2nd with Heather Moyse
2008 - Cesana, (gold) 1st with Jennifer Ciochetti
2008 - St. Moritz, (bronze) 3rd with Heather Moyse
2008 - Winterberg, (gold) 1st with Jennifer Ciochetti
2008 - Igls, (gold) 1st with Heather Moyse
2009 - Altenberg, (silver) 2nd with Jennifer Ciochetti
2010 - Calgary, (bronze) 3rd with Shelley-Ann Brown
2010 - Lake Placid, (bronze) 3rd with Shelley-Ann Brown
2011 - Cesana, (gold) 1st with Shelley-Ann Brown
