= Sally da Silva =

Brazilian bobsledder

Personal information
- Full name: Sally Mayara da Silva
- Born: 4 March 1987 (age 38) Jaraguá do Sul, Brazil
- Height: 1.69 m (5 ft 7 in)
- Weight: 74 kg (163 lb)

Sport
- Country: Brazil
- Sport: Bobsleigh

Sally Mayara da Silva (born March 4, 1987 in Jaraguá do Sul) is a Brazilian bobsledder.

Da Silva competed at the 2014 Winter Olympics for Brazil. She teamed with Fabiana Santos in the two-woman event, finishing 19th.
