= Shelley-Ann Brown =

Canadian bobsledder

Shelly-Ann Brown
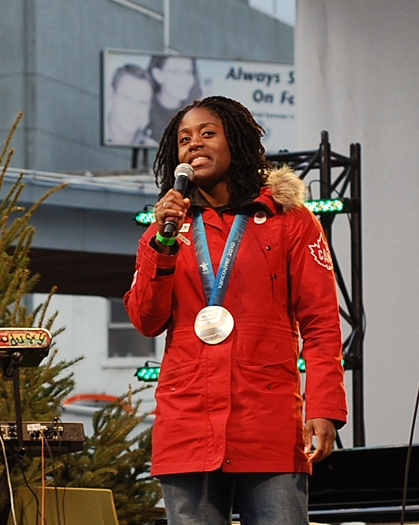
- Brown in 2010

Personal information
- Born: Shelley-Ann Camille Brown; March 15, 1980 (age 46) Scarborough, Ontario, Canada
- Home town: Oshawa, Ontario, Canada
- Education: University of Nebraska–Lincoln (BS, MS)
- Height: 173 cm (5 ft 8 in)
- Weight: 75 kg (165 lb)

Sport
- Country: Canada
- Sport: Bobsleigh
- Position: Pilot
- Event: 2-woman
- Turned pro: 2006
- Coached by: Tuffield Latour
- Retired: 2012
Medal record
Bobsleigh
Representing Canada
Olympic Games
Silver medal – second place	2010 Vancouver	Two-woman

Shelly-Ann Camille Brown CM (born March 15, 1980) is a Canadian former bobsledder who has competed since 2006.She was born in Scarborough, Ontario to Jamaican immigrant parents, and also raised in nearby Pickering, Ontario. Brown was recruited to the University of Nebraska–Lincoln on a track and field scholarship, and graduated with a degree in biology and a master's in educational psychology.

Her best finish in the Bobsleigh World Cup was third in the two-man is event at Lake Placid in December 2007. Brown's best finish at the FIBT World Championships was fifth in the two-woman event at Altenberg in 2008.

She won a silver medal in the Two-woman competition at the 2010 Winter Olympics with Helen Upperton. The gold medal was won by fellow Canadians Kaillie Humphries and Heather Moyse. It marked the first time of the 2010 Olympics that Canadians had won two medals in one event.

Brown and Upperton announced their retirements from the sport in September 2012.
