= IBSF World Championships 2023 – Two-woman =

Two-woman at the IBSF World Championships 2023
- Venue: St. Moritz-Celerina Olympic Bobrun
- Location: St. Moritz, Switzerland
- Dates: 3–4 February
- Competitors: 38 from 10 nations
- Teams: 19
- Winning time: 4:32.86

Medalists
gold medal	Kim Kalicki; Leonie Fiebig	Germany
silver medal	Lisa Buckwitz; Kira Lipperheide	Germany
bronze medal	Kaillie Humphries; Kaysha Love	United States

The Two-woman competition at the IBSF World Championships 2023 was held on 3 and 4 February 2023.

== Results ==
The first two runs were started on 3 February at 13:04 and the last two runs on 4 February at 09:00.

Rank	Bib	Country	Athletes	Run 1	Rank	Run 2	Rank	Run 3	Rank	Run 4	Rank	Total	Behind
1st place, gold medalist(s)	10	Germany	Kim Kalicki; Leonie Fiebig	1:08.16	2	1:07.96	2	1:08.41	1	1:08.33	2	4:32.86	
2nd place, silver medalist(s)	4	Germany	Lisa Buckwitz; Kira Lipperheide	1:08.03	1	1:08.04	4	1:08.52	3	1:08.32	1	4:32.91	+0.05
3rd place, bronze medalist(s)	8	United States	Kaillie Humphries; Kaysha Love	1:08.28	4	1:08.08	5	1:08.41	1	1:08.60	3	4:33.37	+0.28
4	7	Switzerland	Melanie Hasler; Nadja Pasternack	1:08.83	6	1:07.90	1	1:08.79	4	1:08.77	4	4:34.29	+1.43
5	18	France	Margot Boch; Carla Sénéchal	1:08.87	7	1:08.41	6	1:09.11	5	1:09.39	12	4:35.78	+2.92
6	16	Germany	Maureen Zimmer; Lauryn Siebert	1:08.34	5	1:08.81	11	1:09.71	13	1:08.99	5	4:35.85	+2.99
7	11	Switzerland	Martina Fontanive; Mara Morell	1:08.95	8	1:08.73	9	1:09.38	8	1:09.11	6	4:36.17	+3.31
8	5	Canada	Cynthia Appiah; Niamh Haughey	1:09.11	10	1:08.78	10	1:09.35	7	1:09.23	8	4:36.47	+3.61
9	3	China	Ying Qing; Wang Yu	1:08.99	9	1:08.72	8	1:09.50	9	1:09.33	11	4:36.54	+3.68
10	15	China	Huai Mingming; Wang Xuan	1:09.14	11	1:08.55	7	1:09.66	12	1:09.23	8	4:36.58	+3.72
11	2	Romania	Andreea Grecu; Teodora Vlad	1:09.20	13	1:08.95	13	1:09.54	10	1:09.12	7	4:36.81	+3.95
12	1	United States	Nicole Vogt; Jasmine Jones	1:09.16	12	1:08.94	12	1:09.63	11	1:09.27	10	4:37.00	+4.14
13	6	Canada	Bianca Ribi; Erica Voss	1:09.45	14	1:09.00	14	1:09.31	6	1:09.41	13	4:37.17	+4.31
14	12	Slovakia	Viktória Čerňanská; Lucia Mokrášová	1:09.49	15	1:09.14	15	1:09.89	14	1:09.72	15	4:38.24	+5.38
15	17	Italy	Giada Andreutti; Tania Vicenzino	1:09.51	16	1:09.30	16	1:09.95	17	1:10.14	16	4:38.90	+6.04
16	19	Poland	Linda Weiszewski; Marika Zandecka	1:10.01	18	1:10.03	19	1:09.93	16	1:09.61	14	4:39.58	+6.72
17	13	United States	Riley Compton; Emily Renna	1:09.98	17	1:09.62	17	1:09.92	15	1:10.16	17	4:39.68	+6.82
18	14	Romania	Georgeta Popescu; Antonia Sârbu	1:10.32	19	1:09.66	18	1:10.18	18	1:10.31	18	4:40.47	+7.61
—	9	Germany	Laura Nolte; Neele Schuten	1:08.21	3	1:08.00	3	Did not finish					
