= Emily Baadsvik =

Canadian bobsledder

Personal information
- Born: April 12, 1983 (age 43) Smithers, British Columbia

Sport
- Country: Canada
- Sport: Bobsleigh
Medal record
Women´s Bobsleigh
Representing Canada
World Championships
Bronze medal – third place	2012 Lake Placid	Mixed team

Emily Baadsvik (born April 12, 1983) is a Canadian bobsledder.

== Early life and career ==
Baadsvik was born on April 12, 1983 in Smithers, British Columbia, and was raised in New Brunswick. In 2006, she moved from New Brunswick to Alberta to pursue a rugby career; however, an injury forced her to stop competing.

Following the 2010 Winter Olympics in Vancouver, Canadian bobsledder Morgan Alexander encouraged Baadsvik to attend a bobsleigh team training camp. In 2014, she was an alternate member of the Canadian bobsleigh team for the Sochi Winter Olympics.

In 2015, Baadsvik co-founded Wild Tea Kombucha.

== Career highlights ==
Olympic Winter Games
2014 – Sochi, Alternate – Push Athlete, Did Not Compete

World Championships
2013 – St. Moritz, (bronze) 3rd with Kaillie Humphries
2012 – Lake Placid, 6th with Jennifer Ciochetti

World Cup Single Events
2013/2014 – Park City, 13th with Jennifer Ciochetti
2012/2013 – La Plagne, 13th with Jennifer Ciochetti
2012/2013 – Park City, 14th with Jennifer Ciochetti
2011/2012 – La Plagne, (gold) 1st with Kaillie Humphries
2011/2012 – Whistler, (gold) 1st with Kaillie Humphries
2011/2012 – St. Moritz, 4th with Kaillie Humphries
2011/2012 – Königsee, (silver) 2nd with Kaillie Humphries
