= Kaysha Love =

American bobsledder (born 1997)

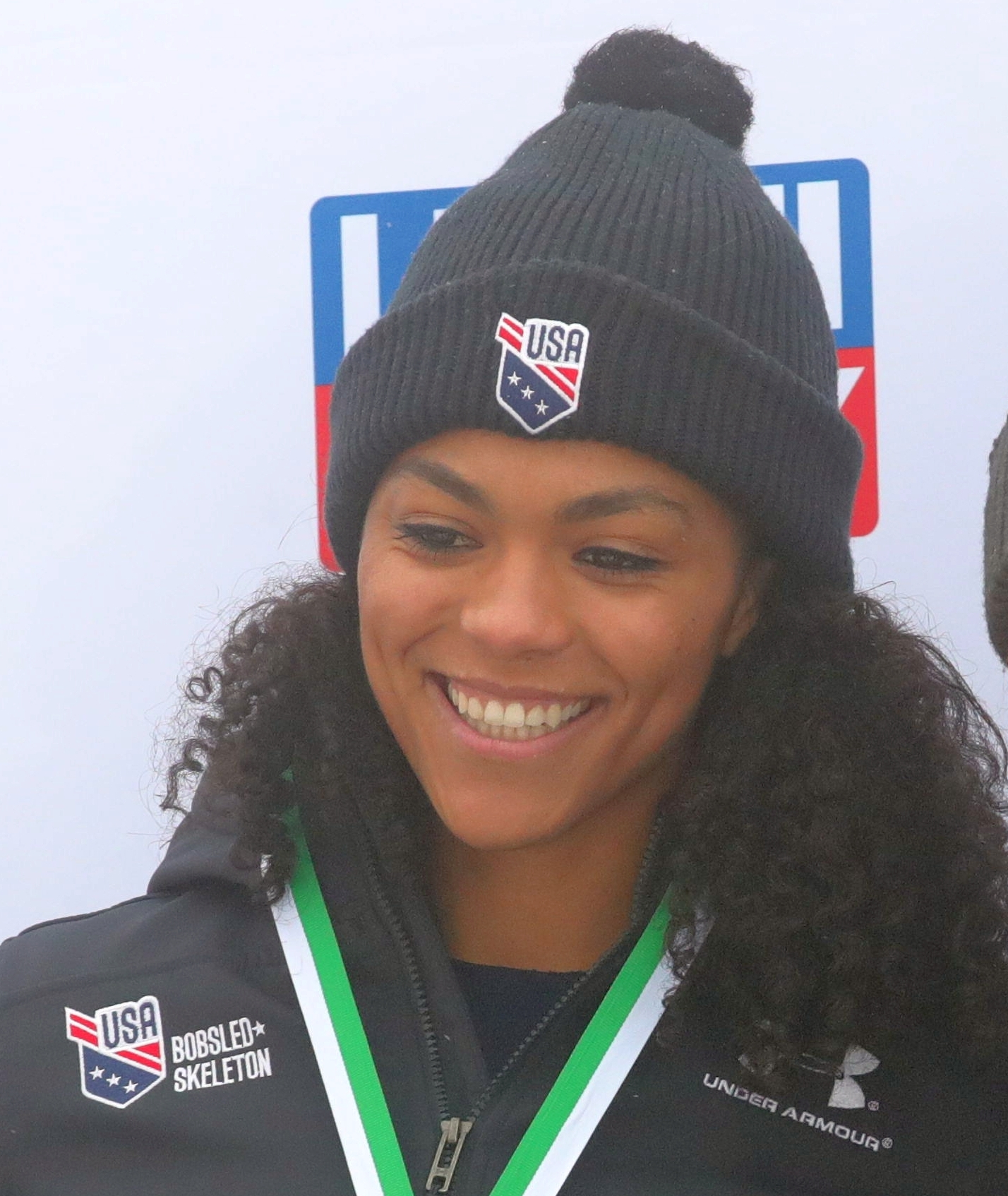
- Love in 2023

Personal information
- Born: September 24, 1997 (age 29) West Jordan, Utah, U.S.
- Education: Herriman High School; UNLV

Sport
- Country: United States
- Sport: Bobsleigh; Track and field
- Events: Bobsleigh: Two-woman; Track and field: 60m, 100m, 200m, 4x100m relay, 4x400m relay, and high jump
- Coached by: Mike Kohn (bobsleigh)

Achievements and titles
- Olympic finals: Olympian (2022) (two-woman bobsleigh)
- Personal bests: 60m: 7.33; 100m: 11.47; 200m: 23.66; 4x100m relay: 43.81; 4x400m relay: 3:35.35; High jump: 1.71m
Medal record
Women's bobsleigh
Representing the United States
World Championships
Gold medal – first place	2025 Lake Placid	Monobob
Bronze medal – third place	2023 St. Moritz	Two-woman

Kaysha Love (born September 24, 1997) is an American bobsledder and former collegiate sprinter. She attended and competed in track and field at the University of Nevada-Las Vegas, where she was a two-time Second Team All-American (2017–2018). She was Utah’s 2016 Gatorade State Girls Track and Field Athlete of the Year in high school. She represented the United States at the 2022 and 2026 Winter Olympics.

== Early life ==
Love was born to parents Stephanie and Kevin, in West Jordan, Utah, a suburb of Salt Lake City. She has two sisters, Makya and Jasmyne. At age 5, she began gymnastics, ultimately achieving Level 10 status. However, she was forced to end her gymnastics career when she entered high school after being sidelined for extended periods due to a broken toe and pulled hamstring, coupled with ongoing chronic knee pain.

She attended Herriman High School in Herriman, Utah. As a sprinter on Herriman’s track and field team, she helped the Mustangs win four straight state titles and earned 16 state titles in individual and team relay events. She specifically competed in the 60m, 100m, 200m, 4x100m relay, 4x400m relay, and high jump.

As a freshman, she won the 4A state titles in the 100m (11.94) and 200m (24.13). Her 4x100m relay team placed second (49.13). She finished fourth in the high jump (1.55m). As a sophomore, she won the 5A state titles in the 100m (11.90), 200m (24.31), and 4x100m relay (47.74, team time). As a junior, she won the 5A state titles in the 100m (12.03), 200m (24.72), and 4x100m relay (48.92, team time). She finished third in the high jump (1.60m).

As a senior, she won the 5A state titles in the 100m (12.13), 200m (24.46), and 4x100m relay (48.51, team time, Love ran anchor). She tied for second in the 5A high jump (1.60m) at the Utah UHSAA State Track & Field Championships. She also won the 100m (11.77) and 200m (24.28) in the seeded section at the Arcadia Invitational meet. She was the 2016 Gatorade State Girls Track and Field Athlete of the Year in Utah following her senior performance.

She set numerous Utah high school girls' track records, including 100m dash (11.68) (outright record), 200m dash (24.52) (4A record and tied-eighth outright), and 4x100m relay (47.33) (outright record). She finished her high school career with the following personal bests: 60m (7.53), 100m (11.63w/11.68), 200m (24.11), and high jump (1.73m).

== Track career ==
=== 2018 ===
As a freshman at UNLV, Love competed in both indoor and outdoor track and field meets in a total of 11 meets. She competed in four indoor track and field meets, including the 2017 Mountain West Indoor Championships, in the 60m, 200m, and high jump. At the Mountain West Indoor Championships, she finished fourth and seventh in the 60m (7.45, personal best) and 200m (24.22, personal best), respectively. Competing in the 100m, 200m, and 4x100m relay, she participated in seven outdoor meets, including the 2017 Mountain West Outdoor Championships, NCAA West Preliminary, and NCAA Outdoor Championships. At the Mountain West Outdoor Championships, she ran a personal-best 100m time of 11.73 and helped her 4x100m relay team to a program-best and first-place finish (43.81). Her 4x100m relay team qualified for the NCAA West Preliminary and NCAA Outdoor Championships.

Her 2017 outdoor 4x100m relay performance earned her Mountain West All-Conference Team and U.S. Track & Field and Cross Country Coaches Association (USTFCCCA) Second Team All-America honors.

=== 2018 ===
As a sophomore, she participated in four indoor (60m, 200m, and 4x400m relay) and 10 outdoor (100m, 200m, 4x100m relay, and 4x400m relay) meets. At the 2018 Mountain West Indoor Championship, she helped her relay team win the 4x400m and posted personal-best times in the 60m (7.38) and 200m (23.96). At the 2018 Mountain West Outdoor Championships, she helped her 4x100m and 4x400m relay teams achieve second-place finishes in both events. She also finished fifth place in both the 100m (11.37) and 200m (23.58), with season-best times in both events. In the 100m, she qualified for the NCAA West Preliminary. In the 4x100m relay, she helped her team qualify for the NCAA West Preliminary, then the NCAA Outdoor Championships.

She was named to the Mountain West All-Conference Team for the indoor 200m x 4x400m relay and the outdoor 4x100m and 4x400m relays. She was again named to the USTFCCCA All-America Second Team for the 4x100m relay.

=== 2019 ===
As a junior, she competed in five indoor (60m, 200m, and 4x400m relay) and eight outdoor (100m, 200m, 4x100m relay, 4x400m relay, 1600m sprint medley relay, and high jump) meets. At the 2019 Mountain West Indoor Championships, she placed fourth and sixth in the 200m and 60m, respectively. At the Steve Scott Invitational, she finished second in the 200m with a personal-best time of 23.66; she also helped her relay team win the 4x400m (3:40.31). She posted a personal-best height of 1.71m in the high jump at the Sheila Tarr Multis meet. At the 2019 Mountain West Outdoor Championships, she helped her 4x100m relay team to a fourth-place finish; she finished fifth and sixth in the 100m and 200m, respectively. She qualified for the NCAA West Preliminary in the 100m, where she posted a time of 11.52.

=== 2020 ===
She competed in six indoor meets in the 60m, 200m, and 4x400 relay as a senior. At the Mountain West Conference Indoor Championships, she finished third in the 60m (7.48), fourth in the 200m (23.71, career-best time), and second in the 4x400m relay (3:37.03). At the NAU Friday Night Duals, she posted a career-best 60m time of 7.33 seconds. Love’s 60m and 4x400m relay performances earned her 2020 Mountain West All-Conference Team honors. The 2020 Mountain West Outdoor Track & Field Championships were canceled due to the COVID-19 pandemic.

Love completed her collegiate track and field career ranked among the best all-time in the UNLV record books, including: first in the outdoor 4x100m relay (43.81), third in the indoor 4x400m relay (3:38.65), fourth in the indoor 60m (7.38); and fifth in the outdoor 4x400m relay (3:35.35). She finished her UNLV career with the following indoor personal bests: 60m in 7.33, 200m in 23.71, and high jump of 1.55m. Her UNLV outdoor personal bests included: 100m in 11.47, 200m in 23.66, and high jump of 1.71m.

== Bobsled career ==
Love did not begin bobsledding until age 23 when she was invited to a 12-day USA Bobsled rookie push camp in Lake Placid, New York, in October 2020 after the encouragement of her UNLV track coach, Larry Wade. Shortly after that, a representative of the USA bobsled team, also recognizing Love’s talent as a sprinter, reached out and invited her to a virtual bobsled combine, where she further impressed Team USA coaches. Shortly after that, she was invited to compete in the North American Cup Circuit, then on the U.S. World Cup Team.

On November 28, 2021, she made her International Bobsleigh & Skeleton Federation (IBSF) World Cup debut in Innsbruck, Austria, competing with pilot Elana Meyers Taylor in the two-woman bobsled, in which they placed fifth. On December 5, 2021, she and pilot Kaillie Humphries finished in first place at the IBSF World Cup competition, Love’s second career World Cup event, in Altenberg, Germany. She finished sixth or better in each of her six career bobsled races before the 2022 Winter Olympics.

On January 17, 2022, after competing in just six bobsled races in her career, Love was named to the U.S. Olympic bobsled team to compete in the 2022 Winter Olympics in Beijing. She was the first Utah native to become an Olympic bobsledder since Steven Holcomb, at one time the most decorated bobsledder in U.S. history. On February 18, 2022, less than 18 months after the commencement of her bobsled career, she made her Olympic debut in the two-women bobsled competition as she competed as the brakewoman alongside her teammate pilot, Kaillie Humphries.

On December 18, 2022, Love and Humphries finished in first place at the IBSF World Cup competition in Lake Placid, New York. It was Love's second World Cup victory and her first appearance on the circuit during the 2022–23 Bobsleigh World Cup. She is beginning the transition from push athlete to driver after competing as a driver on the lower-level North American Cup this fall.

Love represented the United States at the IBSF World Championships 2025 and won a gold medal in the monobob with a time of 3:57.82. She defeated two-time defending IBSF World Champion Laura Nolte by 0.44 seconds.

She was named in the United States team for the 2026 Winter Olympics. Love finished seventh in the monobob and fifth in two-woman.

== Personal life ==
In high school, she maintained at least a 3.75 GPA all four years and graduated in the top 100 students of Herriman’s class of 2016. She also earned Herriman’s Outstanding Mustang Award. In 2021, she graduated from UNLV with a bachelor’s degree in Hospitality.

Love comes from a family of athletes. Her mother, father, and sister, Jasmyne, all played sports collegiately. Her mother (maiden name Johnston) played basketball at Salt Lake Community College. Her father played basketball at Utah Valley University. Jasmyne played volleyball at Salt Lake Community College and Cal State-East Bay.
