= Fabiana Santos =

Brazilian bobsledder (born 1983)

Personal information
- Born: 3 November 1983 (age 42) Santo André, Brazil
- Height: 1.68 m (5 ft 6 in)
- Weight: 75 kg (165 lb)

Sport
- Country: Brazil
- Sport: Bobsleigh

Fabiana Santos (born November 3, 1983 in Santo André) is a Brazilian bobsledder.

Santos competed at the 2014 Winter Olympics for Brazil. She teamed with Sally Mayara da Silva in the two-woman event, finishing 19th.

Santos made her World Cup debut in February 2005. As of April 2014, her best World Cup finish is 15th, at Lake Placid in 2004-05.
