= Kaillie Humphries =

Canadian-American bobsledder (born 1985)

Kaillie Armbruster Humphries OLY
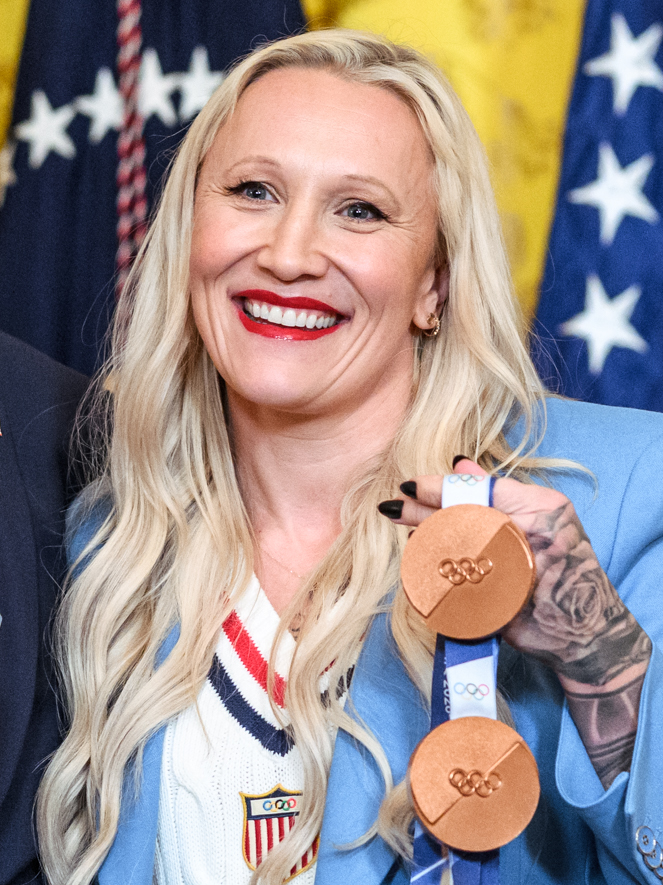
- Humphries in 2026

Personal information
- Nationality: Canadian, American
- Born: September 4, 1985 (age 41) Calgary, Alberta, Canada
- Height: 1.70 m (5 ft 7 in)
- Weight: 76 kg (168 lb)

Sport
- Sport: Bobsleigh
- Events: Two-woman, monobob
- Coached by: Stefan Bosch

Achievements and titles
- Olympic finals: 1st place, gold medalist(s) 3rd place, bronze medalist(s)
Medal record
Women's bobsleigh
Representing the United States
Olympic Games
Gold medal – first place	2022 Beijing	Monobob
Bronze medal – third place	2026 Milano Cortina	Monobob
Bronze medal – third place	2026 Milano Cortina	Two-woman
World Championships
Gold medal – first place	2020 Altenberg	Two-woman
Gold medal – first place	2021 Altenberg	Two-woman
Gold medal – first place	2021 Altenberg	Monobob
Silver medal – second place	2023 St. Moritz	Monobob
Bronze medal – third place	2023 St. Moritz	Two-woman
Representing Canada
Olympic Games
Gold medal – first place	2010 Vancouver	Two-woman
Gold medal – first place	2014 Sochi	Two-woman
Bronze medal – third place	2018 Pyeongchang	Two-woman
World Championships
Gold medal – first place	2012 Lake Placid	Two-woman
Gold medal – first place	2013 St. Moritz	Two-woman
Silver medal – second place	2008 Altenberg	Mixed team
Silver medal – second place	2016 Igls	Two-woman
Silver medal – second place	2017 Königssee	Two-woman
Bronze medal – third place	2011 Königssee	Two-woman
Bronze medal – third place	2011 Königssee	Mixed team
Bronze medal – third place	2012 Lake Placid	Mixed team
Bronze medal – third place	2013 St. Moritz	Mixed team
Bronze medal – third place	2015 Winterberg	Mixed team

Kaillie Armbruster Humphries (née Simundson; September 4, 1985) is a Canadian and American bobsledder.

Humphries was one of the first women to pilot a mixed-gender team in a four-person bobsled competition. She was also the first woman to drive an all-female team against men in a four-person World Cup bobsled race.

Representing Canada, she was the 2010 and 2014 Olympic champion in the two-woman bobsled and the 2018 Olympic bronze medalist with brakewoman Phylicia George. With her victory in 2014, she became the first female bobsledder to defend her Olympic title and was named flagbearer for the Olympic closing ceremony with brakewoman Heather Moyse.

In 2019, Humphries switched to representing the United States “because of alleged hostile verbal and non-verbal harassment”, resulting in two related items that she claims she faced from the Canadian bobsled federation. She won three IBSF World Championship medals for Team USA in the 2020 and 2021 seasons, making her a five-time world champion and the most decorated woman in bobsled history. She also swept the two-woman and monobob events at the 2021 IBSF World Championships, making her the first female bobsledder to win a double world title.

She was named to the U.S. bobsledding team for the Beijing Winter Olympics in February 2022, two months after she became a naturalized United States citizen, and won gold in the monobob event. This gold medal win meant she was the first woman in Olympic history to win gold medals for two different countries (United States and Canada), and the first person to win Olympic gold medals for the United States and Canada.

== Early years ==
Kaillie Simundson was born in Calgary to Ray Simundson, a financial planner, and Cheryl Simundson. At age 7, after handling the gold medal of an Olympic swimmer, she set a goal to win a gold medal herself. She took up ski racing and, at age 14, was named to the Canadian national development team. She attended the National Sport School in Calgary. She competed in alpine skiing until the age of 16, when she retired from the sport after breaking both legs in separate crashes. In 2002, she began her bobsled career as a brakewoman and was an alternate to the Canadian team at the 2006 Winter Olympics in Torino.

== Bobsled career ==
Simundson was initially low on the Canadian depth chart and considered representing the United Kingdom, the country of her then-fiancé, Dan Humphries, to compete at the 2006 Olympics. Opting to remain with the Canadian team, she gained a spot on the roster after signing up for a bobsled driving school. Following her marriage to Humphries in 2007, she changed her name to Kaillie Humphries.

Humphries won the silver medal in the mixed bobsled-skeleton team event at the 2008 FIBT World Championships in Altenberg, Germany. Following a seventh-place finish in the 2008–09 Bobsleigh World Cup series, she finished second overall in the 2009-10 series with one win, two other podium finishes, and never less than a top-six finish (in a field of 20) over eight races.

At the 2010 Winter Olympics, Humphries won the gold medal in the two-woman competition with brakewoman Heather Moyse. The silver medal was won by fellow Canadians Shelley-Ann Brown and Helen Upperton. After the final run, Humphries said: "I don't think I can put it into words yet. We did our job, you know. The goal I set as a little kid, to have done it, is amazing."

After the 2010 Olympics, Humphries met with less success for nearly two seasons. She finished on the podium only once during the 2010–11 World Cup series, though her consistent top-10 finishes allowed her to finish in third place overall. She slid to fifth place overall in the 2011–12 World Cup series, though she did have four podium finishes, including three gold medals.

Humphries teamed up with brakewoman Emily Baadsvik and then brakewoman Jennifer Ciochetti for consecutive wins in the last two races of the 2011–12 World Cup. Humphries and Ciochetti also won the 2012 World Championship race in Lake Placid, marking the first gold for a Canadian women's bobsled team at the World Championships. When asked what the result meant on top of her Olympic gold, she said: "It feels amazing. It is another goal accomplished. This means a lot to me. I feel like I'm still growing as a pilot, and I try to learn from every experience. I have been working on my consistency, and I'm glad it showed here." In the team event, Humphries helped guide the Canadians to a bronze medal.

These three gold medals started a winning streak that would eventually break records for woman's bobsled competition.

=== Competitiveness ===
Humphries, with new brakewoman Chelsea Valois, was the dominant pilot during the 2012–13 Bobsleigh World Cup season. The pair finished on the podium in all nine races that season, including a historic five straight wins from the start of the season. They won the overall season championship with a record 1,960 points on six gold, one silver, and two bronze medal finishes.

Humphries' success in the winter of 2012–13 included a repeat as world champion while setting a track record at the 2013 FIBT World Championship race in St. Moritz. She finished on the podium in all 10 FIBT races during the 2012–13 season, and extended her consecutive FIBT podium finishes to 13 when counting the last two races of the 2011–12 World Cup season plus the 2012 FIBT World Championship race. This streak included a run of eight consecutive wins from the end of 2011–12 through the start of 2012–13, while teamed with three different brakewomen (Baadsvik for one win, Ciochetti for two wins, and Valois for the rest).

The 2013–14 World Cup season saw Humphries reunited with her Vancouver 2010 teammate, Heather Moyse. Humphries extended her podium streak to 15 with a win in the first race of the season and a silver in the second race—an unbroken run of 11 gold medals, 2 silver medals, and 2 bronze medals from the end of 2011–12 through the start of 2013–14. She traded podium positions with the American team of pilot Elana Meyers and brakewoman Lauryn Williams throughout the 2013–14 season and ultimately won her second consecutive World Cup season title.

The close contest between the Canadians and Americans carried into the 2014 Sochi Olympics. Meyers and Williams led by just over two-tenths of a second after Day 1 of competition—uncharacteristically beating Humphries and Moyse at their strong suit start times, though Humphries made fewer driving errors and produced cleaner runs. On the second day of competition, the Americans again won on starting pushes but made several driving errors on the technical course. Humphries' clean piloting propelled the Canadians from second place into the gold medal position, making them the first female bobsled team to repeat as Olympic champions and the first female Canadian Olympians to repeat as champions since speed skater Catriona Le May Doan. Humphries said of the achievement: "How do you describe achieving a dream? This is a four-year goal of ours. This has been something that we've done together. Winning gold is amazing, but walking away satisfied is better. After the third run, I knew that if we did the business, we could be on top."

Humphries received the 2014 Lou Marsh Award, given annually to Canada's top athlete.

=== Mixed-sex competitions ===
After the Fédération Internationale de Bobsleigh et de Tobogganing announced that it would allow mixed-sex crews to compete in four-man bobsled, Humphries piloted a mixed-sex team to the bronze medal in the Canadian four-man bobsled championships on November 1, 2014, allowing her team to join crews led by Justin Kripps and Chris Spring as official Canadian entries on the international circuit.

On November 15, Humphries and Elana Meyers of the United States became the first women to compete with or against men in an international four-man bobsled competition, in the season-opening North American Cup race in Park City, Utah. Humphries piloted her mixed-sex sled to a sixth-place finish, while Meyers piloted hers to seventh. Later the same month, Humphries and Meyers became the first women to win medals in international four-man bobsled competition when they finished second and third in a North American Cup race at the Calgary track.

On January 9, 2016, Humphries became the first woman to drive an all-female team against men in a four-person World Cup bobsled race; her teammates were Cynthia Appiah, Geneviève Thibault, and Melissa Lotholz. Although they finished last, Humphries said the purpose was to help get a four-woman bobsled division added to the Olympics. She said she knew their entry would not be a contender due to the 300-pound weight difference between her team and the all-men teams.

=== Legal actions and switch to US ===
In 2018, Humphries filed harassment complaints against Bobsleigh Canada Skeleton (BCS) head coach Todd Hays, high-performance director Chris Le Bihan, and president Sarah Storey, alleging she initially suffered hostile verbal and non-verbal harassment, which was then allegedly exacerbated by acts of punishment for having reported the harassment, and a failure by the BCS to initiate appropriate action of an allegation of harassment has occurred. She petitioned to be freed from the Canadian team—as required by the International Bobsleigh and Skeleton Federation, though she had no contractual obligations to BCS—in order to compete for the United States. BCS refused to release her for competitive reasons, which led to a lawsuit and a filing with the Sport Dispute Resolution Centre of Canada (SDRCC).

An independent investigation by Hill Advisory Inc., which BCS hired, concluded in September 2019 that there was insufficient evidence to convict Hays, Le Bihan, or Storey. In September 2019, BCS granted Humphries' request to be released from the Canadian program, and she began to compete for the United States.

On July 15, 2021, Humphries received a decision from an SDRCC arbitrator, Robert P. Armstrong, with respect to her appeal of the investigation conducted by Bobsleigh Canada Skeleton. While Armstrong dismissed the alleged acts of punishment for having reported the harassment, he rejected the Hill investigation of the precipitating allegation and of the efficacy of how BCS handled the allegation; he ordered an independent investigation through the SDRCC. He concluded “that the investigation of Mr. Hill was neither thorough nor reasonable. As a result, the decision of the board of BCS to accept the report cannot stand. ... Mr. Hill simply makes conclusive statements without any sufficient analysis to support his conclusion." The second, independent, investigation was submitted to BCS in 2023, which the BCS stated showed "no evidence that the allegations constituted harassment or discrimination", and it also found no fault in how the organization handled the complaint.

Humphries represented the United States at the 2022 Winter Olympics and won a gold medal in the monobob event, and finished in seventh place in the two-woman event with brakewoman Kaysha Love. That gold medal win meant she was the first woman in Olympic history to win gold medals for two different countries (United States and Canada), and the first person to win Olympic gold medals for America and Canada.

At the 2026 Winter Olympics, Humphries won her second Olympic monobob medal, with bronze on February 16. Five days later, she and brakewoman Jasmine Jones won the bronze in the two-woman bobsled event.

== Personal life ==
Humphries married Dan Humphries, a former bobsledder who competed for Great Britain and Canada, in 2007. They divorced before the 2014 Olympics.

Humphries married American bobsledder Travis Armbruster in 2019. After giving birth in 2024, Humphries described her greater level of confidence in "Who I am as a Woman".

=== Activism ===
Humphries is affiliated with the "I've Been Bullied" campaign; Right to Play, a sports program for underprivileged youth; and the Special Olympics. In April 2011, through Right to Play, she and Canadian gymnast Kyle Shewfelt traveled to Liberia to set up sports programs for underprivileged children. She has also spoken at elementary schools in Calgary about the importance of physical activity, setting goals, and avoiding drugs.

=== Politics ===
In February 2026, she stated that she is a Republican and supports President Trump's agenda of banning transgender from competing in women's sports. In March 2026, Humphries presented her Order of Ikkos medallion to President Trump at a White House event for Women's History Month. She said, "Every Olympic medalist in the United States gets an Order of Ikkos that they get to hand to somebody in honor and recognition of somebody who's made a meaningful contribution to their journey to the podium, because Olympic medals are never achieved alone… I am here today, and I'm so honored to present this, my Order of Ikkos medal to you, Donald Trump," and adding, "I want to recognize the support and the impact you've had on women's sports… specifically standing up to keep biological women in women's sports, to keep the field of play safe and allow for fair competition."

== Career highlights ==
Olympic Winter Games
2006 – Turin, alternate – push athlete, did not compete
2010 – Vancouver, (gold) 1st with Heather Moyse
2014 – Sochi, (gold) 1st with Heather Moyse
2018 – Pyeongchang, (bronze) 3rd with Phylicia George
2022 – Beijing, (gold) 1st in the monobob
2026 – Milan / Cortina, (bronze) 3rd in the monobob

FIBT (IBSF) World Cup Overall Season Championship
Third, (bronze) overall in the 2009–10 FIBT World Cup season
Third, (bronze) overall in the 2010–11 FIBT World Cup season
Second, (silver) overall in the 2014–15 FIBT World Cup season
First, (gold) overall in the 2012–13 FIBT World Cup season
First, (gold) overall in the 2013–14 FIBT World Cup season
First, (gold) overall in the 2015–16 FIBT World Cup season

World Championships
2008 – Altenberg, (silver) 2nd with Combined Team Event
2011 – Winterberg, (bronze) 3rd with Heather Moyse
2011 – Winterberg, (bronze) 3rd with Combined Team Event
2012 – Lake Placid, (gold) 1st with Jennifer Ciochetti
2012 – Lake Placid, (bronze) 3rd with Combined Team Event
2013 – St. Moritz, (gold) 1st with Chelsea Valois
2013 – St. Moritz, (bronze) 3rd with Combined Team Event
2016 – Igls, (silver) 2nd with Melissa Lotholz,
2017 – Königssee, (silver) 2nd with Melissa Lotholz

World Cup Single Events
2007/2008 – Lake Placid, (bronze) 3rd with Heather Moyse
2008/2009 – Whistler, (silver) 2nd with Heather Moyse
2008/2009 – Park City, (silver) 2nd with Shelley-Ann Brown
2009/2010 – Lake Placid, (bronze) 3rd with Combined Team Event
2009/2010 – Lake Placid, (bronze) 3rd with Heather Moyse
2009/2010 – Igls, (bronze) 3rd with Heather Moyse
2009/2010 – Königssee, (silver) 2nd with Heather Moyse
2009/2010 – Altenberg, (gold) 1st with Heather Moyse
2010/2011 – Whistler, (bronze) 3rd with Heather Moyse
2011/2012 – Königssee, (bronze) 3rd with Combined Team Event
2011/2012 – Königssee, (silver) 2nd with Emily Baadsvik
2011/2012 – La Plagne, (gold) 1st with Emily Baadsvik
2011/2012 – Whistler, (gold) 1st with Emily Baadsvik
2011/2012 – Calgary, (gold) 1st with Jennifer Ciochetti
2012/2013 – Lake Placid, (gold) 1st with Chelsea Valois
2012/2013 – Park City, (gold) 1st with Chelsea Valois
2012/2013 – Whistler, (gold) 1st with Chelsea Valois
2012/2013 – Winterberg, (gold) 1st with Chelsea Valois
2012/2013 – La Plagne, (gold) 1st with Chelsea Valois
2012/2013 – Altenberg, (bronze) 3rd with Chelsea Valois
2012/2013 – Königssee, (gold) 1st with Chelsea Valois
2012/2013 – Igls, (silver) 2nd with Chelsea Valois
2012/2013 – Sochi, (bronze) 3rd with Chelsea Valois
2013/2014 – Calgary, (gold) 1st with Heather Moyse
2013/2014 – Park City, (silver) 2nd with Heather Moyse
2013/2014 – Lake Placid, (gold) 1st with Heather Moyse
2013/2014 – St. Moritz, (gold) 1st with Heather Moyse
2013/2014 – Königssee, (bronze) 3rd with Heather Moyse
2014/2015 – Calgary, (bronze) 3rd with Kate O'Brien
2014/2015 – Altenberg, (bronze) 3rd with Melissa Lotholz
2014/2015 – Lake Placid, (bronze) 3rd with Melissa Lotholz
2014/2015 – Sochi, (silver) 2nd with Melissa Lotholz
2015/2016 – Lake Placid, (silver) 2nd with Melissa Lotholz

Europa Cup
2006/2007 – Europa Cup, (gold) Champion

World Junior Championship
2006 – Silver medalist, (silver)
