= Chelsea Valois =

Canadian bobsledder

Personal information
- Born: October 11, 1987 (age 38) Carrot River, Saskatchewan, Canada
- Height: 1.78 m (5 ft 10 in)
- Weight: 72 kg (159 lb)

Sport
- Country: Canada
- Sport: Bobsleigh
- Event: 2-woman
Medal record
Women´s Bobsleigh
Representing Canada
World Championships
Gold medal – first place	2013 St. Moritz	Two-woman
Bronze medal – third place	2013 St. Moritz	Mixed team

Chelsea Valois (born October 11, 1987) is a Canadian bobsledder who has competed since 2012. She currently acts as the brakewoman for Jennifer Ciochetti and formerly Kaillie Humphries. Valois began as a track athlete at the University of Regina before switching to bobsleigh.

During the 2012–13 Bobsleigh World Cup she helped push Humphries to five straight wins. This success would continue as the pair placed first at the 2013 FIBT World Championships in St. Moritz.

== Achievements ==
Year	Competition	Venue	Position	Event	Notes
Representing Saskatchewan
2009	2009 Canada Games		2nd	Heptathlon	
