= Lisa Szabon =

Canadian bobsledder

Lisa Szabon (born March 21, 1982) and raised in Nanton, Alberta, is a Canadian bobsledder who has competed since 2004. Her best Bobsleigh World Cup finish was eighth in the two-woman event twice (Park City - December 2007, Winterberg - February 2008). She is also a two time national champion for her Canadian Championships races.

Szabon also finished 11th in the two-woman event at the 2008 FIBT World Championships in Altenberg.

She was also involved in the homologation of the Whistler Sliding Centre in British Columbia in March 2008. The Centre hosted the bobsleigh, luge, and skeleton events for the 2010 Winter Olympics in Vancouver, British Columbia. Szabon then went on to forerun for the bobsleigh events at the 2010 Winter Olympics, missing qualifying for the Canadian Olympic team by a margin.

Szabon resides in High River, Alberta with here husband and daughter. Now married with the last name Szabon-Smith.

She is the owner and operator of The Hub Performance Training (http://www.thehubpt.com), a fitness facility in High River focusing on athletic development for youth athletes, general and functional fitness for the adult population and bringing Olympic weightlifting to the youth, open and masters age groups.
