= Alexandra Tüchi =

Austrian bobsledder

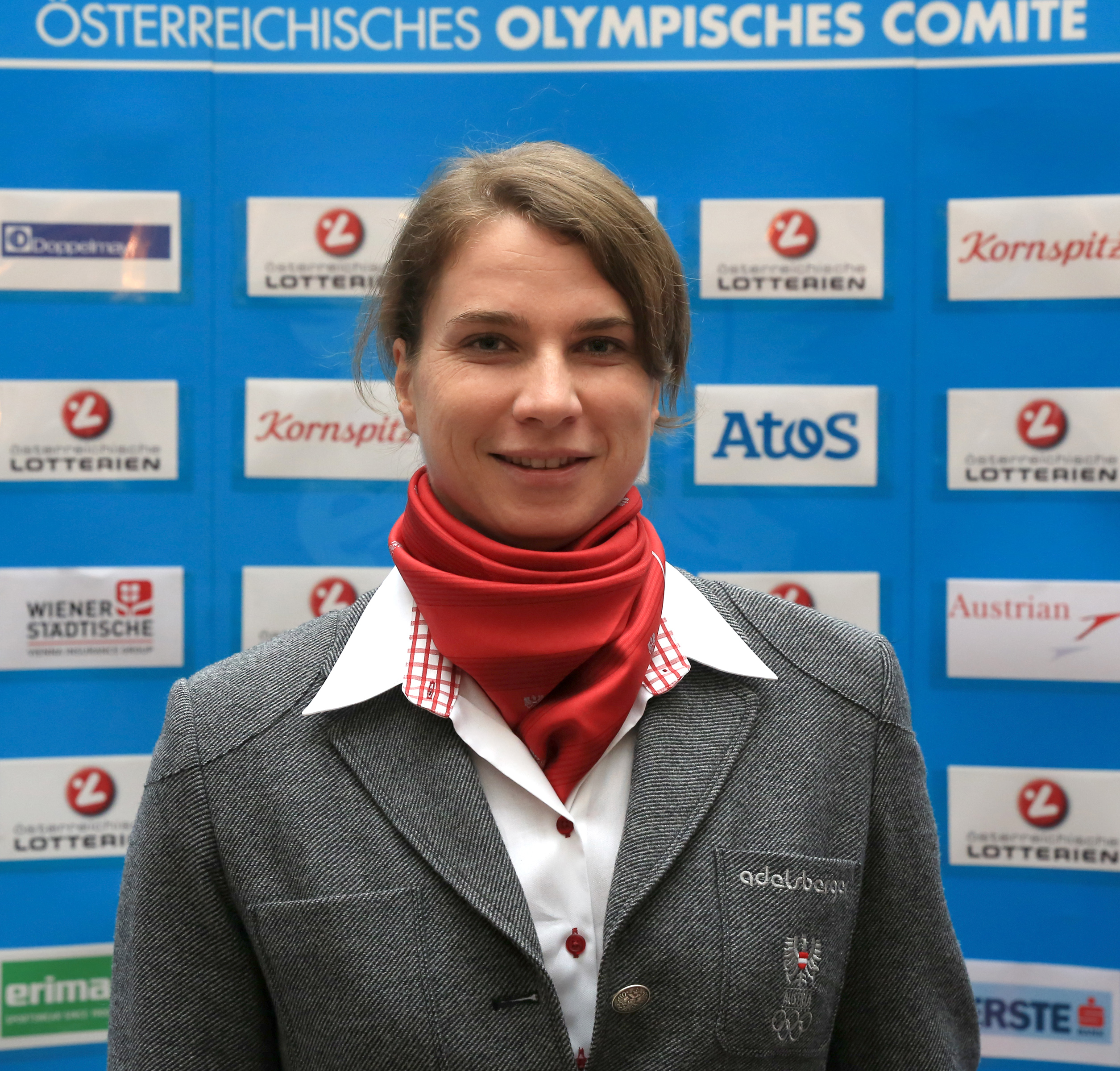

Personal information
- Nationality: Austrian
- Born: 10 September 1983 (age 42) Innsbruck, Austria
- Height: 1.80 m (5 ft 11 in)
- Weight: 78 kg (172 lb)

Sport
- Country: Austria
- Sport: Bobsleigh

Alexandra Tüchi (born 10 September 1983 in Innsbruck) is an Austrian bobsledder.

Tüchi competed at the 2014 Winter Olympics for Austria, where she teamed with driver Christina Hengster in the two-woman event, finishing 15th. She replaced Viola Kleiser for the last two runs.

Tüchi made her World Cup debut in December 2009. As of April 2014, her best World Cup finish was 6th in a team event at Konigssee in 2011-12. Her best finish in an Olympic event is 8th, received at the 2012–13 Olympic Games in Whistler.
