= Rebekah Wilson =

British bobsledder

Personal information
- Nationality: British
- Born: 17 March 1991 (age 35) Manchester, England
- Years active: 2010–present
- Height: 1.58 m (5 ft 2 in)
- Weight: 66 kg (146 lb)
- Spouse: Ange Wilson-Gill (married 9/04/2022

Sport
- Country: United Kingdom
- Sport: Bobsleigh
- Event: Two-woman bobsleigh
- Club: GB Bobsleigh
- Coached by: Morris Condon; Allyn Condon
- Updated on 17 February 2014

Rebekah 'Bex' Wilson (born 17 March 1991) is a British former bobsleigh brakewoman. She competed at the trials for the 2010 Winter Olympics, and the two-woman bobsleigh at the 2014 Winter Olympics.

== Biography ==
Wilson was born on 17 March 1991 in Manchester, England. She attended Navigation Road Primary School and Wellington School.

When Wilson was nine years old, she took up athletics, after trialling several events including the 100m. She was a member of Altrincham Athletics Club. At 14, Wilson changed clubs, moving to her present club of Sale Harriers. At 100 metres, she won five national titles, was a World Junior finalist at the 4 × 100 m relay. At 12 Wilson set a European Record for the 60m, which stands at present.

Wilson was the Great British number one from the age of 18, but each year has to participate in a selection process.

In 2010 Paula Walker approached Wilson's athletics coaches with regards to competing alongside Walker in the two-women bobsleigh.

Wilson quit the national programme and UK Sport funding, and moved from the Great Britain bobsleigh headquarters in Bath back to her native Manchester, cutting her communications with British Bobsleigh for a year. In the year leading up to the Olympics, she didn't practice at bobsleigh, but worked in a gym. In order to pay for training, Wilson took on odd jobs, such as babysitting, waitressing, and working as a nail technician. A year after Wilson's not competing at Vancouver, Walker and Wilson won a World Junior Championship together, re-uniting after Wilson's topping the GB trials.

After the 2014 Winter Olympics Wilson retired from bobsleigh due to mental health problems and the retirement of Walker, subsequently undergoing intermittent treatment at the Priory Hospital for the next 18 months. As of July 2017, Wilson is a programme manager for the Diane Modahl Foundation, and plays for Women's Super Rugby side Waterloo Ladies.

=== Olympics ===
Wilson trialled for the 2010 Winter Olympics in Vancouver, but finished fifth and was not selected.

Wilson and Walker were announced as GBR1 for the two-women bobsleigh at the 2014 Winter Olympics in Sochi. Wilson replaced Walker's partner for the previous season Gillian Cooke. Walker and Wilson targeted a top-eight finish in the discipline, in order to preserve funding for Walker. They competed on 18 February 2014, finishing in 12th.
