= Viola Kleiser =

Austrian bobsledder and sprinter

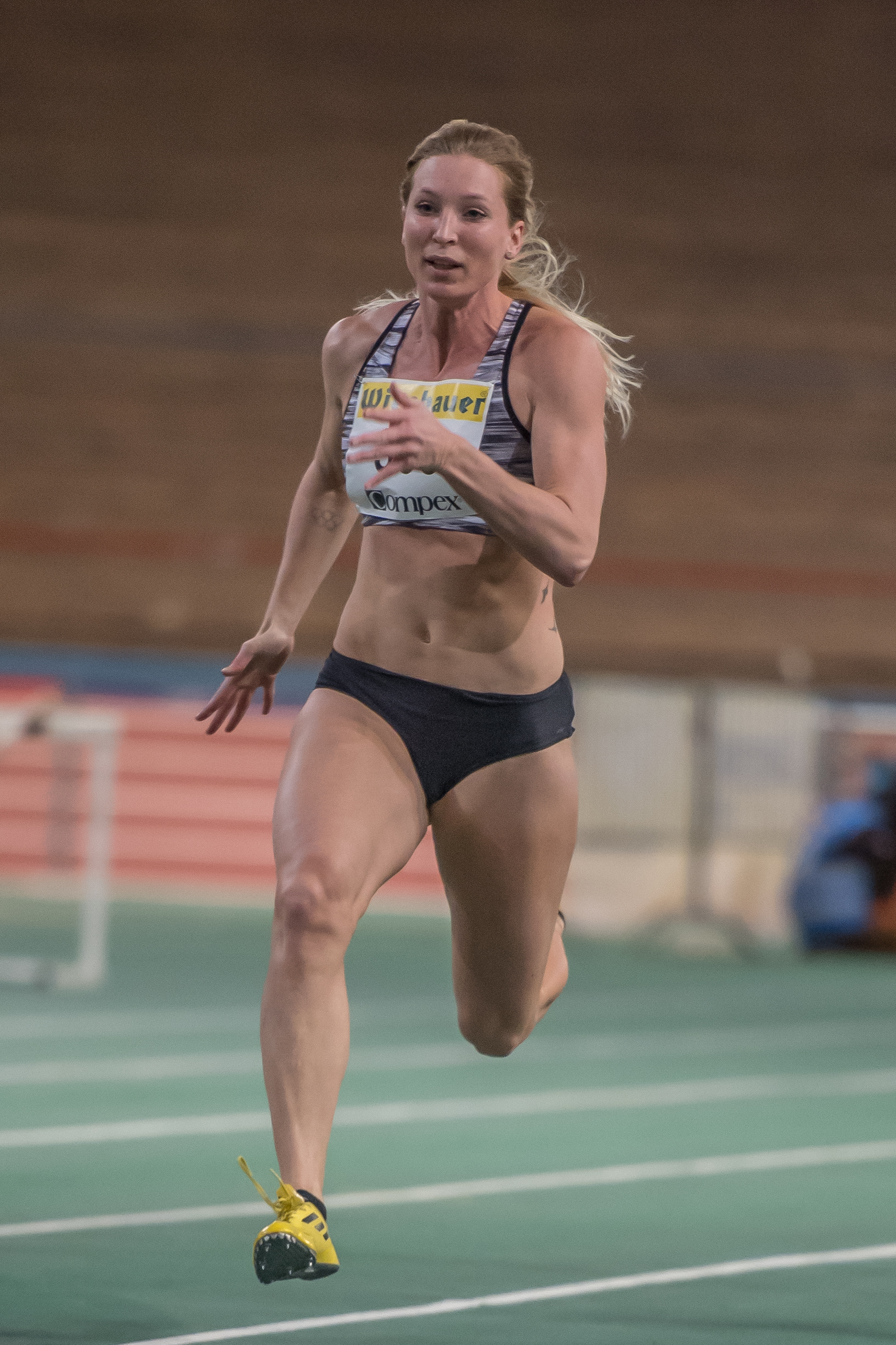

Personal information
- Nationality: Austrian
- Born: 13 November 1990 (age 35) Vienna, Austria
- Education: University of Missouri–Kansas City; University of Vienna
- Height: 1.78 m (5 ft 10 in)
- Weight: 72 kg (159 lb)

Sport
- Country: Austria
- Sport: Bobsleigh, athletics

Viola Kleiser (born 13 November 1990 in Vienna) is an Austrian bobsledder and sprinter.

Before bobsleigh, Kleiser was a student-athlete at the University of Missouri–Kansas City where she majored in psychology. Under the direction of head track coach Shameika McField, she ran short sprints and relays for the team.

== Career ==
=== Best Times ===
Indoor-

- 60 meters: 7.59 at NÖLV county championships, 7 January 2015
- 200 meters: 25.17 at The Summit League Championships, 15 February 2012 (UMKC School Record)

Outdoor-

- 100 meters: 11.68 Meeting at Kapfenberg, 20 July 2014
- 200 meters: 24.07 at Austrian championships 3 August 2014
- 400 meters: 56.62 at MU Relays, 24 March 2012

Kleiser competed at the 2014 Winter Olympics for Austria. She teamed with driver Christina Hengster in the two-woman event, finishing 15th. She participated in the first two runs, before being replaced by Alexandra Tüchi.

Kleiser made her World Cup debut in November 2013. As of April 2014, her best World Cup finish is 12th, at Calgary in 2013–14.

Kleiser is currently competing in the 2015 European Games, the first of its kind, for her home country of Austria, in team athletics, and earned a silver medal.

== Personal life ==
She was born to Sigrid Eysn and Christoph Kleiser on 13 November 1990. Viola has two sisters, Valerie Kleiser and Flora Kleiser.
