= Elena Doronina =

Russian bobsledder (born 1981)

Elena Doronina (born 14 August 1981) is a Russian bobsledder who has competed since 2004. She finished ninth in the two-woman event at the 2010 Winter Olympics in Vancouver.

Doronina's best finish at the FIBT World Championships was 15th in the two-woman event at St. Moritz in 2007.
