= Laura Curione =

Italian bobsledder (born 1988)

Laura Curione (born November 9, 1988) is an Italian bobsledder who has competed since 2008. She finished 13th in the two-woman event at the 2010 Winter Olympics in Vancouver.

Curione finished 14th in the two-woman event at the FIBT World Championships 2009 in Lake Placid, New York.

Her best World Cup finish was 12th on three occasions in 2008 and 2009.
