= Jennifer Ciochetti =

Canadian bobsledder

Jennifer Ciochetti Korol
Personal information
- Nationality: Canadian
- Born: December 2, 1984 (age 41) Edmonton, Alberta
- Height: 1.70 m (5 ft 7 in)
- Weight: 75 kg (165 lb)

Sport
- Country: Canada
- Sport: Bobsleigh
- Event: 2-woman
Medal record
Women´s Bobsleigh
Representing Canada
World Championships
| Gold medal – first place | 2012 Lake Placid | Two-woman |
| Bronze medal – third place | 2012 Lake Placid | Team event |

Jennifer Ciochetti (born December 2, 1984) is a Canadian bobsledder who has competed since 2006. Ciochetti was a world champion in 2012 in the two-woman event and also won a bronze medal in the team event that year as well.

== Career ==
Despite being a driver for much of the 2011–12 season, Ciochetti finished the last half of the year as the brakeman for Kaillie Humphries. Together, partnering with her, they won the world championship at the 2012 World Championships, leading the entire way. They also partnered up to help the Canadians win the bronze in the team event that same year. Ciochetti is currently competing as a driver with Humphries's former brakeman Chelsea Valois.

== Career highlights ==
World Championships
2007 – St. Moritz, 6th with Helen Upperton
2008 – Altenberg, 4th with Upperton
2012 – Lake Placid, (gold) with Kaillie Humphries
World Cup
2006 – Park City, (bronze) 3rd with Helen Upperton
2007 – Cortina d'Ampezzo, (bronze) 3rd with Helen Upperton
2007 – Calgary, (gold) 1st with Helen Upperton
2007 – Lake Placid, (silver) 2nd with Helen Upperton
2008 – Cesana, (gold) 1st with Helen Upperton

== Personal life ==
Jennifer Ciochetti Korol is married to Christopher Korol
