= Margot Boch =

French bobsledder (born 1999)

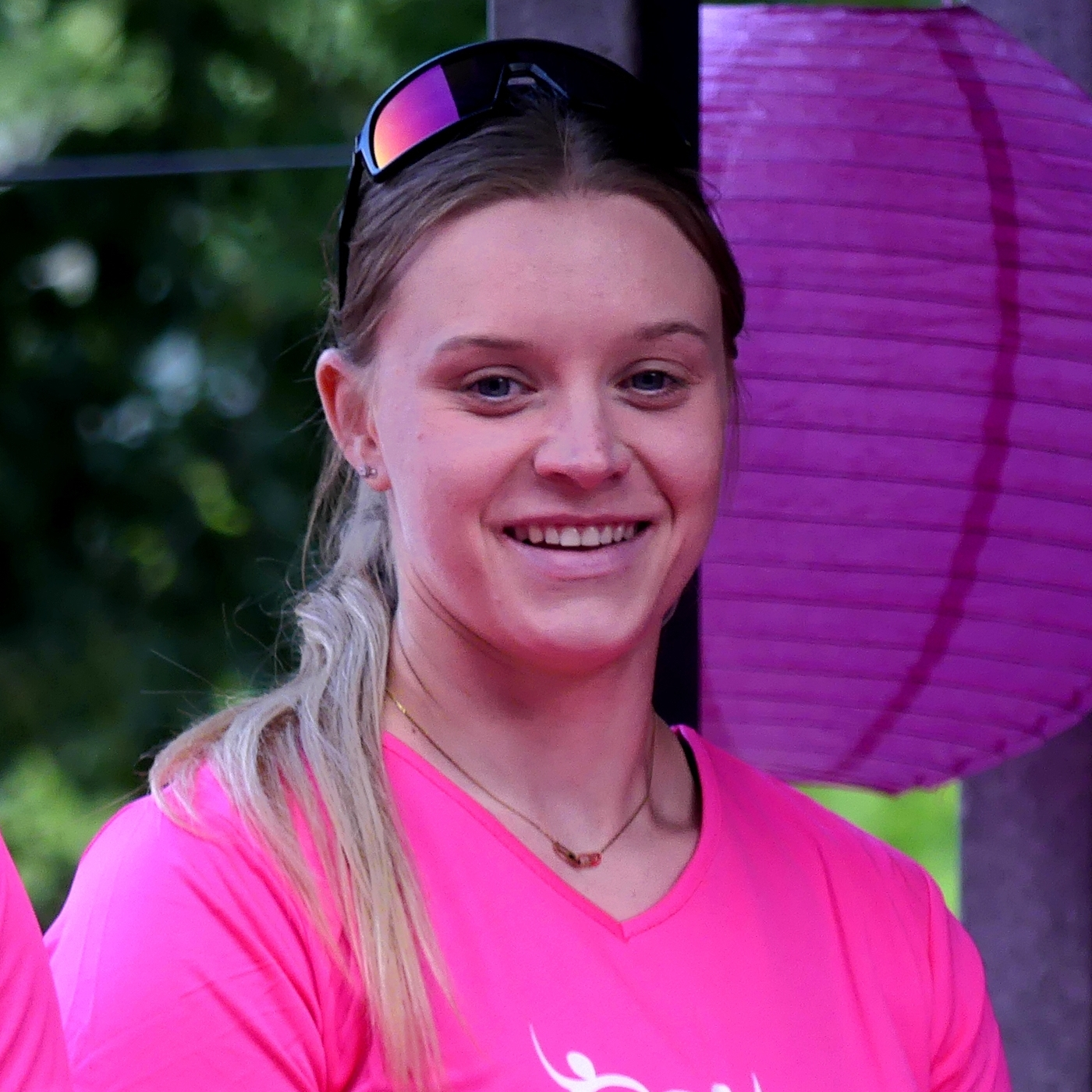
- Boch in 2025

Personal information
- Born: 13 June 1999 (age 27) Mâcot-la-Plagne, France
- Height: 1.62 m (5 ft 4 in)
- Weight: 65 kg (143 lb)

Sport
- Country: France
- Sport: Bobsleigh
- Events: Two-woman, monobob
- Coached by: Bruno Mingeon

Margot Boch (French: [maʁɡo bɔk]; born 13 June 1999) is a French bobsledder. She represented France at the 2022 and 2026 Winter Olympics.

== Career ==
Boch made her international debut for France at the 2020 Winter Youth Olympics. She then competed at the 2022 Winter Olympics and finished in eleventh place in the monobob. She also finished in twelfth place in the two-woman event. This marked the first time a French women's bobsled team qualified for the Winter Olympics.

In February 2023, she competed at the IBSF World Championships 2023 and finished in fifth place in the two-woman event, with a time of 4:35.78.

She was again selected to represent France at the 2026 Winter Olympics. Boch finished 10th in the monobob and 17th in two-woman.

== Personal life ==
Boch's grandfather and father are both former bobsledders.
