= Paula Jackson =

British bobsledder

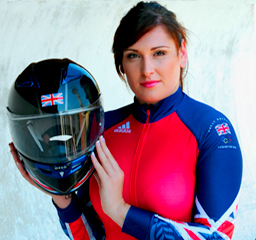

Personal information
- Nationality: British
- Born: Paula Walker; 23 April 1986 (age 40) Leicester, England
- Height: 1.82 m (6 ft 0 in)
- Weight: 92 kg (203 lb)
- Spouse: John Jackson

Sport
- Country: United Kingdom
- Sport: Bobsleigh (pilot)
- Club: GB Team
- Retired: May 2015
Medal record
Women's Bobsleigh
Representing Great Britain
World Junior Championships
Gold medal – first place	2011 Park City, USA	Two-woman
America Cup
Silver medal – second place	2010 Park City, USA	Two-woman
Bronze medal – third place	2010 Park City, USA	Two-woman

Paula Jackson (née Walker; born 23 April 1986) is a British retired bobsledder who competed from 2007 to 2014. She originally started as a brakewoman for Jackie Gunn before taking up piloting.

Jackson finished 11th in the two-woman event at the 2010 Winter Olympics in Vancouver alongside brakewoman Kelly Thomas, and took 12th in the same event at the 2014 Winter Olympics in Sochi with Rebekah Wilson.

Jackson, along with Rebekah Wilson, won the world junior bobsleigh title at the Park City track in 2011. Jackson piloted the no.1 sled for Great Britain in the 2010–11 season.

== Career ==
Jackson is a corporal in the Royal Corps of Signals. She started with the sport of bobsleigh at the age of 19. She has also represented the British Army in badminton, boxing, rounders, rugby and athletics. Her husband is fellow bobsledder John James Jackson. She is coached by Peter Gunn and by former sprinter and bobsledder Allyn Condon. In June 2014 Jackson announced that she would miss the 2014-15 season due to pregnancy. She gave birth to a daughter, Poppy, in late 2014, and in May 2015 announced her retirement from the sport in order to focus on motherhood.

== Achievements ==
Her best World Cup finish was sixth, which she achieved three times in the two-woman event: at Calgary in the 2011–12 season and at Lake Placid and Whistler in the 2012–13 season.

Jackson finished 11th in the two-woman event at the 2010 Winter Olympics in Vancouver. She won gold in Park City and is the 2011 Junior World Champion (the first ever British female to do this.) Her best results at the FIBT World Championships are a fourth place in the mixed team event in 2011 and a seventh in the two-woman competition in 2012. Her best performance at the Bobsleigh European Championship was a fourth place in the two-woman event in 2013.
