= IBSF World Championships (bobsleigh and skeleton) =

Winter sport championship

The IBSF World Championships (known as the FIBT World Championships until 2015), part of the International Bobsleigh and Skeleton Federation, have taken place on an annual basis since 1930. Starting with 2002, World Championships are not being held in Winter Olympic years. A two-man event was included in 1931 with a combined championship occurring in 1947. Men's skeleton was introduced as a championship of its own in 1982 while women's bobsleigh and skeleton events were introduced in 2000. Both the women's bobsleigh and skeleton events were merged with the men's bobsleigh events at the 2004 championships. A mixed team event, consisting of one run each of men's skeleton, women's skeleton, 2-man bobsleigh, and 2-women bobsleigh, was held from 2007 to 2019. In 2020 it was replaced with skeleton mixed team event, consisting of one run each of men's and women's skeleton. Women's monobob event was included in 2021.

== Host cities ==
Year	Host city/cities	Men's bobsleigh		Women's bobsleigh		Skeleton			Mixed team	Notes
Year	Host city/cities	Two man	Four man	Monobob	Two woman	Men's	Women's	Mixed team	Mixed team	Notes
1930	Caux-sur-Montreux, Switzerland		X							First Bobsleigh World Championships (Four-man event only)
1931	(Weimar Republic) Oberhof, Germany	X								First with Two-man event
1931	St. Moritz, Switzerland		X							
1933	Schreiberhau, Germany	X								
1934	Engelberg, Switzerland	X								
1934	(Nazi Germany) Garmisch-Partenkirchen, Germany		X							
1935	Igls, Austria	X								
1935	St. Moritz, Switzerland		X							
1937	(Kingdom of Italy) Cortina d'Ampezzo, Italy	X								
1937	St. Moritz, Switzerland		X							
1938	St. Moritz, Switzerland	X								
1938	(Nazi Germany) Garmisch-Partenkirchen, Germany		X							
1939	St. Moritz, Switzerland	X								
1939	(Kingdom of Italy) Cortina d'Ampezzo, Italy		X							
1940–1946: No competition due to Second World War
1947	St. Moritz, Switzerland	X	X							First with all men's bobsleigh events
1949	Lake Placid, New York, United States	X	X							
1950	Cortina d'Ampezzo, Italy	X	X							
1951	Alpe d'Huez, France	X	X							
1953	Garmisch-Partenkirchen, West Germany	X	X							
1954	Cortina d'Ampezzo, Italy	X	X							
1955	St. Moritz, Switzerland	X	X							
1957	St. Moritz, Switzerland	X	X							
1958	Garmisch-Partenkirchen, West Germany	X	X							
1959	St. Moritz, Switzerland	X	X							
1960	Cortina d'Ampezzo, Italy	X	X							Extraordinary event since bobsleigh was not included in the 1960 Winter Olympics
1961	Lake Placid, United States	X	X							
1962	Garmisch-Partenkirchen, West Germany	X	X							
1963	Igls, Austria	X	X							
1965	St. Moritz, Switzerland	X	X							
1966	Cortina d'Ampezzo, Italy	X								Four-man abandoned when Toni Pensperger was killed during competition
1967	Alpe d'Huez, France	X								Four-man abandoned to high temperatures on track caused ice to melt
1969	Lake Placid, United States	X	X							
1970	St. Moritz, Switzerland	X	X							
1971	Cervinia, Italy	X	X							
1973	Lake Placid, United States	X	X							
1974	St. Moritz, Switzerland	X	X							
1975	Cervinia, Italy	X	X							
1977	St. Moritz, Switzerland	X	X							
1978	Lake Placid, United States	X	X							
1979	Königssee, West Germany	X	X							
1981	Cortina d'Ampezzo, Italy	X	X							
1982	St. Moritz, Switzerland	X	X			X				First with skeleton event (men's only)
1983	Lake Placid, United States	X	X							
1985	Cervinia, Italy	X	X							
1986	Königssee, West Germany	X	X							
1987	St. Moritz, Switzerland	X	X							
1989	Cortina d'Ampezzo, Italy	X	X							
1989	St. Moritz, Switzerland					X				
1990	St. Moritz, Switzerland	X	X							
1990	Königssee, West Germany					X				
1991	Altenberg, Germany	X	X							
1991	Igls, Austria					X				
1992	Calgary, Alberta, Canada					X				
1993	Igls, Austria	X	X							Bobsleigh event was originally awarded to Cervinia, Italy
1993	La Plagne, France					X				
1994	Altenberg, Germany					X				
1995	Winterberg, Germany	X	X							
1995	Lillehammer, Norway					X				
1996	Calgary, Canada	X	X			X				First with all men's bobsleigh and skeleton events
1997	St. Moritz, Switzerland	X	X							
1997	Lake Placid, United States					X				
1998	St. Moritz, Switzerland					X				
1999	Cortina d'Ampezzo, Italy	X	X							
1999	Altenberg, Germany					X				
2000	Altenberg, Germany	X	X							
2000	Winterberg, Germany				X					First with Two-woman bobsleigh event
2000	Igls, Austria					X	X			First with women's skeleton event
2001	St. Moritz, Switzerland	X	X							
2001	Calgary, Canada				X	X	X			
2003	Lake Placid, United States	X	X							
2003	Winterberg, Germany				X					
2003	Nagano, Japan					X	X			
2004	Königssee, Germany	X	X		X	X	X			First with all men's and women's bobsleigh and skeleton events
2005	Calgary, Canada	X	X		X	X	X			
2007	St. Moritz, Switzerland	X	X		X	X	X		X	First with Mixed team event (bobsleigh and skeleton)
2008	Altenberg, Germany	X	X		X	X	X		X	
2009	Lake Placid, United States	X	X		X	X	X		X	
2011	Königssee, Germany	X	X		X	X	X		X	Originally awarded to Cortina d'Ampezzo, Italy
2012	Lake Placid, United States	X	X		X	X	X		X	
2013	St. Moritz, Switzerland	X	X		X	X	X		X	
2015	Winterberg, Germany	X	X		X	X	X		X	
2016	Igls, Austria	X	X		X	X	X		X	
2017	Königssee, Germany	X	X		X	X	X		X	Originally awarded to Sochi, Russia
2019	Whistler, Canada	X	X		X	X	X		X	
2020	Altenberg, Germany	X	X		X	X	X	X		First with skeleton's mixed team event
2021	Altenberg, Germany	X	X	X	X	X	X	X		First with women's monobob. Originally awarded to Lake Placid, United States
2023	St. Moritz, Switzerland	X	X	X	X	X	X	X		First combined with World Para Bob Championships
2024	Winterberg, Germany	X	X	X	X	X	X	X		
2025	Lake Placid, United States	X	X	X	X	X	X	X		
2027	Lillehammer, Norway									
2028	St. Moritz, Switzerland									
2029	Park City, Utah, United States									

== Bobsleigh ==
Numbers in brackets denotes number of victories in corresponding disciplines. Boldface denotes record number of victories.

=== Four-man ===
Debuted: 1930.

Season	Gold	Silver	Bronze
1930 Caux-sur-Montreux	Italy; Franco Zaninetta; Giorgio Biasini; Antonio Dorini; Gino Rossi	Switzerland; Jean Moillen; John Schneiter; André Moillen; William Pichard	Germany; Fritz Grau; Hans Picker; Bertram; Albert Brehme
1931 St. Moritz	Germany; Werner Zahn; Robert Schmidt; Franz Bock; Emil Hinterfeld	Switzerland; René Fonjallaz; Gustave Fonjallaz; N. Buchheim; Gaston Fonjallaz	Great Britain; Dennis Field; Patrick Coote; Ralph Wallace; Jack Newcombe
1933 FIBT World Championship event was not held. (Note: 1933 FIBT World Championship event was not held.)
1934 Garmisch-Partenkirchen	Germany; Hanns Kilian; Fritz Schwarz; Hermann von Valta; Sebastian Huber	Romania; Emil Angelescu; Teodor Popescu; Dumitru Gheorghiu; Ion Gribincea	France; Jean de Suarez d'Aulan; Jacques Rheins; William Beamish; Jacques Bridou
1935 St. Moritz	Germany; Hanns Kilian (2); Alexander Gruber; Hermann von Valta (2); Sebastian Huber (2)	Switzerland; Pierre Musy; Noldi Gartmann; Charles Bouvier; Josef Beerli	Switzerland; Reto Capadrutt; Fritz Feierabend; A. Lardi; H. Tami
1937 St. Moritz	Great Britain; Frederick McEvoy; David Looker; Charles Green; Byran Black	Germany; Gerhard Fischer; Lohfeld; H. Fischer; Rolf Thielecke	United States; Donald Fox; Tippi Gray; Bill Dupree; James Bickford
1938 Garmisch-Partenkirchen	Great Britain; Frederick McEvoy (2); David Looker (2); Charles Green (2); Chris MacKintosh	Germany; Hanns Kilian; Werner Windhaus; Bobby Braumiller; Franz Kemser	Germany; Gerhard Fischer; Lohfeld; H. Fischer; Rolf Thielecke
1939 Cortina d'Ampezzo	Switzerland; Fritz Feierabend; Heinz Cattani; Alphonse Hörning; Joseph Beerli	Great Britain; Frederick McEvoy; Peter Howard; John Galt Critchley; Charles Green	Germany; Hanns Kilian; Werner Windhaus; Hans Schmidt; Franz Kemser
1947 St. Moritz	Switzerland; Fritz Feierabend; Heinz Cattani (2); Alphonse Hörning (2); Joseph Beerli (2)	Belgium; Max Houben; Claude Houben; Albert Lerat; Jacques Mouvet	France; Achille Fould; Henri Evrot; Robert Dumont; William Hirigoyen
1949 Lake Placid	United States; Stanley Benham; Patrick Martin; William Casey; William d'Amico	United States; James Bickford; Henry Sterns; Pat Buckley; Donald Dupree	Switzerland; Fritz Feierabend; Werner Spring; Friedrich Waller; Heinrich Angst
1950 Cortina d'Ampezzo	United States; Stanley Benham (2); Patrick Martin (2); James Atkinson; William d'Amico (2)	Switzerland; Fritz Feierabend; Albert Madörin; Romi Spada; Stephen Waser	Switzerland; Franz Kapus; Franz Stöckli; Hans Bolli; Heinrich Angst
1951 Alpe d'Huez	West Germany; Anderl Ostler; Xavier Leitl; Michael Pössinger; Lorenz Niebert	United States; Stanley Benham; Patrick Martin; James Atkinson; Gary Sheffield	Switzerland; Franz Kapus; Franz Stöckli; Hans Bolli; Heinrich Angst
1953 Garmisch-Partenkirchen	United States; Lloyd Johnson; Piet Biesiadecki; Hubert Miller; Joseph Smith	West Germany; Anderl Ostler; Heinz Wendlinger; Hans Hohenester; Rudi Erben	Sweden; Kjell Holmström; Walter Aronsson; Nils Landgren; Jan Lapidoth
1953 Garmisch-Partenkirchen	United States; Lloyd Johnson; Piet Biesiadecki; Hubert Miller; Joseph Smith	West Germany; Anderl Ostler; Heinz Wendlinger; Hans Hohenester; Rudi Erben	West Germany; Hans Rösch; Michael Pössinger; Dix Terne; Sylvester Wackerle
1954 Cortina d'Ampezzo	Switzerland; Fritz Feierabend (3); Harry Warburton; Gottfried Diener; Heinrich Angst	West Germany; Hans Rösch; Michael Pössinger; Dix Terne; Sylvester Wackerle	West Germany; Theo Kitt; Josef Grün; Klaus Koppenberger; Lorenz Niebert
1955 St. Moritz	Switzerland; Franz Kapus; Gottfried Diener (2); Robert Alt; Heinrich Angst (2)	Switzerland; Fritz Feierabend; Aby Gartmann; Harry Warburton; Rolf Gerber	West Germany; Franz Schelle; Jakob Nirschl; Hans Henn; Edmund Koller
1957 St. Moritz	Switzerland; Hans Zoller; Hans Theler; Rolf Küderli; Heinz Leu	Italy; Eugenio Monti; Ferdinando Piani; Lino Pierdica; Renzo Alverà	United States; Arthur Tyler; John Cole; Robert Hagemes; Thomas Butler
1958 Garmisch-Partenkirchen	West Germany; Hans Rösch; Alfred Hammer; Theodore Bauer; Walter Haller	West Germany; Franz Schelle; Eduard Kaltenberger; Josef Sterff; Otto Göbl	Italy; Sergio Zardini; Massimo Bogana; Renato Mocellini; Alberto Righini
1959 St. Moritz	United States; Arthur Tyler; Gary Sheffield; Parker Voorhis; Thomas Butler	Italy; Sergio Zardini; Alberto Righini; Ferruccio Dalla Torre; Romano Bonagura	West Germany; Franz Schelle; Eduard Kaltenberger; Josef Sterff; Otto Göbl
1960 Cortina d'Ampezzo	Italy; Eugenio Monti; Furio Nordio; Sergio Siorpaes; Renzo Alverà	West Germany; Hans Rösch; Alfred Hammer; Theodore Bauer; Albert Kandlbinder	Switzerland; Max Angst; Hansjörg Hirschbühl; Gottfried Kottmann; René Kuhl
1961 Lake Placid	Italy; Eugenio Monti (2); Sergio Siorpaes (2); Furio Nordio (2); Renzo Alverà (2)	United States; Stanley Benham; Gary Sheffield; Jerry Tennant; Chuck Pandolph	Sweden; Gunnar Åhs; Gunnar Garpö; Erik Wennerberg; Börje-Bengt Hedblom
1962 Garmisch-Partenkirchen	West Germany; Franz Schelle; Josef Sterff; Ludwig Siebert; Otto Göbl	Italy; Sergio Zardini; Ferruccio Dalla Torre; Enrico de Lorenzo; Romano Bonagura	Austria; Franz Isser; Pepi Isser; Heini Isser; Fritz Isser
1963 Igls	Italy; Sergio Zardini; Ferruccio Dalla Torre; Renato Mocellini; Romano Bonagura	Italy; Angelo Frigerio; Mario Pallua; Luigi de Bettin; Sergio Mocellini	Austria; Erwin Thaler; Reinhold Dumthaler; Josef Nairz; Adolf Koxeder
1965 St. Moritz	Canada; Vic Emery; Gerald Presley; Michael Young; Peter Kirby	Italy; Nevio de Zordo; Italo de Lorenzo; Pietro Lesana; Robert Mocellini	United States; Fred Fortune; Richard Knuckles; Joe Wilson; James Lord
1966 FIBT World Championship (Note: The 1966 FIBT World Championship event in Cortina d'Ampezzo was abandoned following the death of Toni Pensperger of West Germany during competition. A posthumous gold medal was given to Pensperger, Ludwig Siebert, Helmut Werzer, and Roland Ebert.)
1967 FIBT World Championship (Note: The 1967 FIBT World Championship event in Alpe d'Huez was cancelled to insufficient conditions of the track caused by high temperatures.)
1969 Lake Placid	West Germany; Wolfgang Zimmerer; Peter Utzschneider; Walter Steinbauer; Stefan Gaisreiter	Italy; Gianfranco Gaspari; Sergio Pompanin; Roberto Zandonella; Mario Armano	United States; Les Fenner; Robert Huscher; Howard Siler; Allen Hachigian
1970 St. Moritz	Italy; Nevio de Zordo; Roberto Zandonella; Mario Armano; Luciano de Paolis	West Germany; Wolfgang Zimmerer; Walter Steinbauer; Pepi Bader; Peter Utzschneider	Switzerland; René Stadler; Hans Candrian; Max Forster; Peter Schärer
1971 Cervinia	Switzerland; René Stadler; Max Forster; Erich Schärer; Peter Schärer	Italy; Oscar d'Andrea; Alessandro Bignozzi; Antonio Brancaccio; Renzo Caldara	West Germany; Wolfgang Zimmerer; Stefan Gaisreiter; Walter Steinbauer; Peter Utzschneider
1973 Lake Placid	Switzerland; René Stadler (2); Werner Camichel; Erich Schärer; Peter Schärer	Austria; Werner Delle Karth; Walter Delle Karth; Hans Eichinger; Fritz Sperling	West Germany; Wolfgang Zimmerer; Stefan Gaisreiter; Walter Steinbauer; Peter Utzschneider
1974 St. Moritz	West Germany; Wolfgang Zimmerer (2); Peter Utzschneider (2); Manfred Schumann; Albert Wurzer	Switzerland; Hans Candrian; Guido Casty; Yves Marchand; Gaudenz Beeli	Austria; Werner Delle Karth; Walter Delle Karth; Hans Eichinger; Fritz Sperling
1975 Cervinia	Switzerland; Erich Schärer; Peter Schärer (3); Werner Camichel (2); Josef Benz	West Germany; Wolfgang Zimmerer; Peter Utzschneider; Albert Wurzer; Fritz Ohlwärter	Austria; Manfred Stengl; Gert Krenn; Franz Jakob; Armin Vilas
1977 St. Moritz	East Germany; Meinhard Nehmer; Bernhard Germeshausen; Hans-Jürgen Gerhardt; Raimund Bethge	Switzerland; Erich Schärer; Ulrich Bächli; Rudolf Marti; Josef Benz	West Germany; Jakob Resch; Herbert Berg; Fritz Ohlwärter; Walter Barfuss
1978 Lake Placid	East Germany; Horst Schönau; Horst Bernhard; Harald Seifert; Bogdan Musioł	Switzerland; Erich Schärer; Ulrich Bächli; Rudolf Marti; Josef Benz	East Germany; Meinhard Nehmer; Bernhard Germeshausen; Hans-Jürgen Gerhardt; Raimund Bethge
1979 Königssee	West Germany; Stefan Gaisreiter (2); Dieter Gebard; Hans Wagner; Heinz Busche	East Germany; Meinhard Nehmer; Detlef Richter; Bernhard Germeshausen; Hans-Jürgen Gerhardt	Switzerland; Erich Schärer; Ulrich Bächli; Hansjörg Trachsel; Josef Benz
1981 Cortina d'Ampezzo	East Germany; Bernhard Germeshausen (2); Hans-Jürgen Gerhardt (2); Henry Gerlach; Michael Trübner	Switzerland; Hans Hiltebrand; Kurt Poletti; Franz Weinberger; Franz Isenegger	Switzerland; Erich Schärer; Max Rüegg; Tony Rüegg; Josef Benz
1982 St. Moritz	Switzerland; Silvio Giobellina; Heinz Stettler; Urs Salzmann; Rico Freiermuth	East Germany; Bernhard Lehmann; Roland Wetzig; Bogdan Musioł; Eberhard Weise	Switzerland; Erich Schärer; Franz Isenegger; Tony Rüegg; Max Rüegg
1983 Lake Placid	Switzerland; Ekkehard Fasser; Hans Märcy; Kurt Poletti; Rolf Strittmatter	West Germany; Klaus Kopp; Gerhard Oechsle; Günther Neuberger; Hans-Joachim Schumacher	East Germany; Detlef Richter; Henry Gerlach; Thomas Forch; Dietmar Jerke
1985 Cervinia	East Germany; Bernhard Lehmann; Matthias Trübner; Ingo Voge; Steffen Grummt	East Germany; Detlef Richter; Dietmar Jerke; Bodo Ferl; Matthias Legler	Switzerland; Silvio Giobellina; Heinz Stettler; Urs Salzmann; Rico Freiermuth
1986 Königssee	Switzerland; Erich Schärer (4); Kurt Meier; Erwin Fassbind; André Kiser	Austria; Peter Kienast; Franz Siegl; Gerhard Redl; Christian Mark	Switzerland; Ralph Pichler; Heinrich Notter; Celest Poltera; Roland Beerli
1987 St. Moritz	Switzerland; Hans Hiltebrand; Urs Fehlmann; Erwin Fassbind (2); André Kiser (2)	East Germany; Wolfgang Hoppe; Bogdan Musioł; Roland Wetzig; Dietmar Schauerhammer	Switzerland; Ralph Pichler; Heinrich Ott; Edgar Dietsche; Celest Poltera
1989 Cortina d'Ampezzo	Switzerland; Gustav Weder; Curdin Morell; Bruno Gerber; Lorenz Schindelholz	Switzerland; Nico Baracchi; Christian Reich; Donat Acklin; René Mangold	East Germany; Wolfgang Hoppe; Bodo Ferl; Bogdan Musioł; Ingo Voge
1990 St. Moritz	Switzerland; Gustav Weder; Bruno Gerber (2); Lorenz Schindelholz (2); Curdin Morell (2)	East Germany; Harald Czudaj; Tino Bonk; Alexander Szelig; Axel Jang	Austria; Ingo Appelt; Gerhard Redl; Jürgen Mandl; Harald Winkler
1991 Altenberg	Germany; Wolfgang Hoppe; Bogdan Musioł (2); Axel Kühn; Christoph Langen	Switzerland; Gustav Weder; Bruno Gerber; Lorenz Schindelholz; Curdin Morell	Germany; Harald Czudaj; Tino Bonk; Axel Jang; Alexander Szelig
1993 Igls	Switzerland; Gustav Weder (3); Donat Acklin; Kurt Meier (2); Domenico Semeraro	Austria; Hubert Schösser; Harald Winkler; Gerhard Redl; Gerhard Haidacher	United States; Brian Shimer; Bryan Leturgez; Karlos Kirby; Randy Jones
1995 Winterberg	Germany; Wolfgang Hoppe; René Hannemann; Ulf Hielscher; Carsten Embach	Austria; Hubert Schösser; Gerhard Redl; Thomas Schroll; Martin Schützenauer	Germany; Harald Czudaj; Thorsten Voss; Udo Lehmann; Alexander Szelig
1996 Calgary	Germany; Christoph Langen; Markus Zimmermann; Sven Rühr; Olav Hampel	Switzerland; Marcel Rohner; Markus Wasser; Thomas Schreiber; Roland Tanner	Germany; Wolfgang Hoppe; Thorsten Voss; Sven Peter; Carsten Embach
1997 St. Moritz	Germany; Wolfgang Hoppe (3); Sven Rühr (2); René Hannemann (2); Carsten Embach	Germany; Dirk Wiese; Christoph Bartsch; Thorsten Voss; Michael Liekmeier	United States; Brian Shimer; Chip Minton; Randy Jones; Robert Olesen
1999 Cortina d'Ampezzo	France; Bruno Mingeon; Emmanuel Hostache; Éric Le Chanony; Max Robert	Switzerland; Marcel Rohner; Markus Nüssli; Beat Hefti; Silvio Schaufelberger	Canada; Pierre Lueders; Ken Leblanc; Ben Hindle; Matt Hindle
2000 Altenberg	Germany; André Lange; René Hoppe; Lars Behrendt; Carsten Embach	Germany; Christoph Langen; Markus Zimmermann; Tomas Platzer; Sven Rühr	Switzerland; Christian Reich; Bruno Aeberhard; Urs Aeberhand; Domenic Keller
2001 St. Moritz	Germany; Christoph Langen (3); Markus Zimmermann (2); Sven Peter; Alex Metzger	Germany; André Lange; Lars Behrendt; René Hoppe; Carsten Embach	Switzerland; Christian Reich; Steve Anderhub; Urs Aeberhand; Domenic Keller
2003 Lake Placid	Germany; André Lange; René Hoppe; Kevin Kuske; Carsten Embach (4)	United States; Todd Hays; Bill Schuffenhauer; Randy Jones; Garrett Hines	Russia; Alexandr Zubkov; Aleskey Seliverstov; Sergey Golubev; Dmitriy Stepushkin
2004 Königssee	Germany; André Lange; Udo Lehmann; Kevin Kuske; René Hoppe	Germany; Christoph Langen; Christoph Heyder; Enrico Kühn; Jens Nohka	United States; Todd Hays; Pavel Jovanovic; Bill Schuffenhauer; Steve Mesler
2005 Calgary	Germany; André Lange; René Hoppe; Kevin Kuske; Martin Putze	Russia; Alexandr Zubkov; Sergey Golubev; Aleskey Seliverstov; Dmitriy Stepushkin	Canada; Pierre Lueders; Ken Kotyk; Morgan Alexander; Lascelles Brown
2007 St. Moritz	Switzerland; Ivo Rüegg; Thomas Lamparter; Beat Hefti; Cédric Grand	Canada; Pierre Lueders; Ken Kotyk; David Bissett; Lascelles Brown	Germany; André Lange; René Hoppe; Kevin Kuske; Martin Putze
2008 Altenberg	Germany; André Lange (5); René Hoppe (5); Kevin Kuske (4); Martin Putze	Russia; Alexandr Zubkov; Roman Oreshnikov; Dmitry Trunenkov; Dmitriy Stepushkin	Germany; Matthias Höpfner; Ronny Listner; Thomas Pöge; Alex Mann
2009 Lake Placid	United States; Steven Holcomb; Justin Olsen; Steve Mesler; Curtis Tomasevicz	Germany; André Lange; Alexander Rödiger; Kevin Kuske; Martin Putze	Latvia; Jānis Miņins; Daumants Dreiškens; Oskars Melbārdis; Intars Dambis
2011 Königssee	Germany; Manuel Machata; Richard Adjei; Andreas Bredau; Christian Poser	Germany; Karl Angerer; Christian Friedrich; Alex Mann; Gregor Bermbach	United States; Steven Holcomb; Justin Olsen; Steven Langton; Curtis Tomasevicz
2012 Lake Placid	United States; Steven Holcomb (2); Justin Olsen (2); Steven Langton; Curtis Tomasevicz (2)	Germany; Maximilian Arndt; Alexander Rödiger; Kevin Kuske; Martin Putze	Germany; Manuel Machata; Marko Hübenbecker; Andreas Bredau; Christian Poser
2013 St. Moritz	Germany; Maximilian Arndt; Marko Hübenbecker; Alexander Rödiger; Martin Putze (3)	Russia; Alexandr Zubkov; Alexey Negodaylo; Dmitry Trunenkov; Maxim Mokrousov	United States; Steven Holcomb; Justin Olsen; Steven Langton; Curtis Tomasevicz
2015 Winterberg	Germany; Maximilian Arndt (2); Alexander Rödiger (2); Kevin Korona; Ben Heber	Germany; Nico Walther; Andreas Bredau; Marko Hübenbecker; Christian Poser	Latvia; Oskars Melbārdis; Daumants Dreiškens; Arvis Vilkaste; Jānis Strenga
2016 Igls	Latvia; Oskars Melbārdis; Daumants Dreiškens; Arvis Vilkaste; Jānis Strenga	Germany; Francesco Friedrich; Candy Bauer; Gregor Bermbach; Thorsten Margis	Switzerland; Rico Peter; Bror van der Zijde; Thomas Amrhein; Simon Friedli
2017 Königssee	Germany; Francesco Friedrich; Candy Bauer; Martin Grothkopp; Thorsten Margis	None awarded	Germany; Nico Walther; Kevin Kuske; Kevin Korona; Eric Franke
2017 Königssee	Germany; Johannes Lochner; Matthias Kagerhuber; Joshua Bluhm; Christian Rasp	None awarded	Germany; Nico Walther; Kevin Kuske; Kevin Korona; Eric Franke
2019 Whistler	Germany; Francesco Friedrich; Candy Bauer; Martin Grothkopp; Thorsten Margis	Latvia; Oskars Ķibermanis; Matīss Miknis; Arvis Vilkaste; Jānis Strenga	Canada; Justin Kripps; Ryan Sommer; Cameron Stones; Benjamin Coakwell
2020 Altenberg	Germany; Francesco Friedrich; Candy Bauer; Martin Grothkopp (3); Alexander Schüller	Germany; Johannes Lochner; Florian Bauer; Christopher Weber; Christian Rasp	Germany; Nico Walther; Paul Krenz; Joshua Bluhm; Eric Franke
2021 Altenberg	Germany; Francesco Friedrich; Thorsten Margis; Candy Bauer; Alexander Schüller	Austria; Benjamin Maier; Dănuț Moldovan; Markus Sammer; Kristian Huber	Germany; Johannes Lochner; Florian Bauer; Christopher Weber; Christian Rasp
2023 St. Moritz	Germany; Francesco Friedrich; Thorsten Margis; Candy Bauer (5); Alexander Schüller	Great Britain; Brad Hall; Arran Gulliver; Taylor Lawrence; Greg Cackett	None awarded
2023 St. Moritz	Germany; Francesco Friedrich; Thorsten Margis; Candy Bauer (5); Alexander Schüller	Latvia; Emīls Cipulis; Dāvis Spriņģis; Matīss Miknis; Edgars Nemme	None awarded
2024 Winterberg	Germany; Francesco Friedrich; Thorsten Margis (5); Alexander Schüller (4); Felix Straub	Germany; Johannes Lochner; Florian Bauer; Erec Bruckert; Georg Fleischhauer	Germany; Adam Ammour; Issam Ammour; Benedikt Hertel; Rupert Schenk
2025 Lake Placid	Germany; Francesco Friedrich **(7)**; Matthias Sommer; Alexander Schüller (5); Felix Straub (2)	Germany; Johannes Lochner; Florian Bauer; Jörn Wenzel; Georg Fleischhauer	Great Britain; Brad Hall; ~~Arran Gulliver~~ (disqualified) (Note: After the IBSF World Championships 2025, British bobsledder Arran Gulliver was disqualified individually and stripped of his bronze medal due to an anti-doping rule violation.); Taylor Lawrence; Greg Cackett

Medal table

Rank	Nation	Gold	Silver	Bronze	Total
1	Germany	24	14	13	51
2	Switzerland	16	13	15	44
3	West Germany	6	7	7	20
4	United States	6	4	9	19
5	Italy	5	7	1	13
6	East Germany	4	5	3	12
7	Great Britain	2	2	2	6
8	Latvia	1	2	2	5
9	Canada	1	1	3	5
10	France	1	0	2	3
11	Austria	0	5	5	10
12	Russia	0	3	1	4
13	Belgium	0	1	0	1
13	Romania	0	1	0	1
15	Sweden	0	0	2	2
Totals (15 entries)		**66**	**65**	**65**	**196**

=== Two-man ===
Debuted: 1931.

Season	Gold	Silver	Bronze
1931 Oberhof	Germany; Hanns Kilian; Sebastian Huber	Germany; Bibo Fischer; Gemmer	Austria; Heinz Volkmer; Anton Kaltenberger
1933 Schreiberhau	Romania; Alexandru Papană; Dumitru Hubert	Czechoslovakia; Brüme; Walter Heinzl	Germany; Fritz Grau; Albert Brehme
1934 Engelberg	Romania; Alexandru Frim; Vasile Dumitrescu	Germany; Hermann von Mumm; Fritz Schwarz	Romania; Alexandru Papană; Dumitru Hubert
1935 Igls	Switzerland; Reto Capadrutt; Emil Diener	Czechoslovakia; Josef Lanzendörfer; Karel Růžička	Italy; Marchese Storza Birvio; Carlo Solveni
1937 Cortina d'Ampezzo	Great Britain; Frederick McEvoy; Byran Black	Italy; Umberto Gilarduzzi; Antonio Gilarduzzi	Switzerland; Reto Capadrutt; Hans Aichele
1938 St. Moritz	Germany; Bibo Fischer; Rolf Thielecke	Great Britain; Frederick McEvoy; Charles Green	Switzerland; Fritz Feierabend; Josef Beerli
1939 St. Moritz	Belgium; René Lunden; Jeans Coops	Germany; Bibo Fischer; Rolf Thielecke	Germany; Hanns Kilian; Schletter
1947 St. Moritz	Switzerland; Fritz Feierabend; Stephan Waser	Switzerland; Felix Endrich; Fritz Waller	Belgium; Max Houben; Jacques Mouvet
1949 Lake Placid	Switzerland; Felix Endrich; Fritz Waller	Switzerland; Fritz Feierabend; Heinrich Angst	United States; Frederick Fortune; John McDonald
1950 Cortina d'Ampezzo	Switzerland; Fritz Feierabend; Stephan Waser (2)	United States; Stanley Benham; Patrick Martin	United States; Frederick Fortune; William d'Amico
1951 Alpe d'Huez	West Germany; Anderl Ostler; Lorenz Niebert	United States; Stanley Benham; Patrick Martin	Switzerland; Felix Endrich; Werner Spring
1953 Garmisch-Partenkirchen	Switzerland; Felix Endrich (2); Fritz Stöckli	West Germany; Anderl Ostler; Franz Kemser	West Germany; Theo Kitt; Lorenz Niebert
1954 Cortina d'Ampezzo	Italy; Guglielmo Scheibmeier; Andrea Zambelli	Italy; Italo Petrelli; Luigi Figoli	United States; Stanley Benham; James Bickford
1955 St. Moritz	Switzerland; Fritz Feierabend (3); Harry Warburton	Austria; Paul Aste; Pepi Isser	Switzerland; Franz Kapus; Heinrich Angst
1957 St. Moritz	Italy; Eugenio Monti; Renzo Alverà	United States; Arthur Tyler; Thomas Butler	Spain; Alfonso de Portago; Luis Muñoz
1958 Garmisch-Partenkirchen	Italy; Eugenio Monti; Renzo Alverà	Italy; Sergio Zardini; Sergio Siorpaes	Austria; Paul Aste; Pepi Isser
1959 St. Moritz	Italy; Eugenio Monti; Renzo Alverà	Italy; Sergio Zardini; Sergio Siorpaes	United States; Arthur Tyler; Thomas Butler
1960 Cortina d'Ampezzo	Italy; Eugenio Monti; Renzo Alverà (4)	West Germany; Franz Schelle; Otto Göbl	Italy; Sergio Zardini; Luciano Alberti
1961 Lake Placid	Italy; Eugenio Monti; Sergio Siorpaes	United States; Gary Sheffield; Jerry Tennant	Italy; Sergio Zardini; Romano Bonagura
1962 Garmisch-Partenkirchen	Italy; Rinaldo Ruatti; Enrico de Lorenzo	Italy; Sergio Zardini; Romano Bonagura	West Germany; Hans Maurer; Adolf Wörmann
1963 Igls	Italy; Eugenio Monti; Sergio Siorpaes	Italy; Sergio Zardini; Romano Bonagura	Great Britain; Anthony Nash; Robin Dixon
1965 St. Moritz	Great Britain; Anthony Nash; Robin Dixon	Italy; Rinaldo Ruatti; Enrico de Lorenzo	Canada; Vic Emery; Michael Young
1966 Cortina d'Ampezzo	Italy; Eugenio Monti (7); Sergio Siorpaes (3)	Italy; Gianfranco Gaspari; Leonardo Cavallini	Great Britain; Anthony Nash; Robin Dixon
1967 Alpe d'Huez	Austria; Erwin Thaler; Reinhold Dumthaler	Italy; Nevio de Zordo; Edoardo de Martin	United States; Howard Clifton; James Crall
1969 Lake Placid	Italy; Nevio de Zordo; Adriano Frassinelli	Romania; Ion Panțuru; Dumitru Focseneanu	Italy; Gianfranco Gaspari; Mario Armano
1970 St. Moritz	West Germany; Horst Floth; Pepi Bader	West Germany; Wolfgang Zimmerer; Peter Utzschneider	Switzerland; Gion Caviezel; Hans Candrian
1971 Cervinia	Italy; Gianfranco Gaspari; Mario Armano	Italy; Enzo Vicario; Corrado dal Fabbro	Austria; Herbert Gruber; Josef Oberhauser
1973 Lake Placid	West Germany; Wolfgang Zimmerer; Peter Utzschneider	Switzerland; Hans Candrian; Heinz Schenker	Romania; Ion Panțuru; Dumitru Focseneanu
1974 St. Moritz	West Germany; Wolfgang Zimmerer (2); Peter Utzschneider (2)	West Germany; Georg Heibl; Fritz Ohlwärter	Switzerland; Fritz Lüdi; Karl Häseli
1975 Cervinia	Italy; Giorgio Alvera; Franco Perruquet	West Germany; Georg Heibl; Fritz Ohlwärter	Switzerland; Fritz Lüdi; Karl Häseli
1977 St. Moritz	Switzerland; Hans Hiltebrand; Heinz Meier	Switzerland; Fritz Lüdi; Hansjörg Trachsel	West Germany; Stefan Gaisreiter; Manfred Schumann
1978 Lake Placid	Switzerland; Erich Schärer; Josef Benz	East Germany; Meinhard Nehmer; Raimund Bethge	West Germany; Jakob Resch; Walter Barfuss
1979 Königssee	Switzerland; Erich Schärer; Josef Benz (2)	West Germany; Stefan Gaisreiter; Manfred Schumann; Fritz Ohlwärter (Note: Ohlwärter replaced the injured Schumann after the third heat of the 1979 event.)	West Germany; Toni Mangold; Stefan Späte
1981 Cortina d'Ampezzo	East Germany; Bernhard Germeshausen; Hans-Jürgen Gerhardt	East Germany; Horst Schönau; Andreas Kirchner	Switzerland; Erich Schärer; Josef Benz
1982 St. Moritz	Switzerland; Erich Schärer (3); Max Rüegg	Switzerland; Hans Hiltebrand; Ulrich Bächli	East Germany; Horst Schönau; Andreas Kirchner
1983 Lake Placid	Switzerland; Ralph Pichler; Urs Leuthold	Switzerland; Erich Schärer; Max Rüegg	East Germany; Wolfgang Hoppe; Dietmar Schauerhammer
1985 Cervinia	East Germany; Wolfgang Hoppe; Dietmar Schauerhammer	East Germany; Detlef Richter; Steffen Grummt	Soviet Union; Zintis Ekmanis; Nikolay Zhirov
1986 Königssee	East Germany; Wolfgang Hoppe; Dietmar Schauerhammer (2)	Switzerland; Ralph Pichler; Celest Poltera	East Germany; Detlef Richter; Steffen Grummt
1987 St. Moritz	Switzerland; Ralph Pichler (2); Celest Poltera	East Germany; Wolfgang Hoppe; Dietmar Schauerhammer	None awarded
1987 St. Moritz	Switzerland; Ralph Pichler (2); Celest Poltera	Switzerland; Hans Hiltebrand; André Kiser	None awarded
1989 Cortina d'Ampezzo	East Germany; Wolfgang Hoppe (3); Bogdan Musioł	Switzerland; Gustav Weder; Bruno Gerber	Soviet Union; Jānis Ķipurs; Aldis Intlers
1990 St. Moritz	Switzerland; Gustav Weder; Bruno Gerber	East Germany; Harald Czudaj; Axel Jang	East Germany; Wolfgang Hoppe; Bogdan Musioł
1991 Altenberg	Germany; Rudi Lochner; Markus Zimmermann	Switzerland; Gustav Weder; Curdin Morell	Germany; Wolfgang Hoppe; René Hannemann
1993 Igls	Germany; Christoph Langen; Peer Joechel	Switzerland; Gustav Weder; Donat Acklin	Germany; Wolfgang Hoppe; René Hannemann
1995 Winterberg	Germany; Christoph Langen; Olav Hampel	Canada; Pierre Lueders; Jack Pyc	France; Éric Alard; Éric Le Chanony
1996 Calgary	Germany; Christoph Langen; Markus Zimmermann	Canada; Pierre Lueders; David MacEachern	Switzerland; Reto Götschi; Guido Acklin
1997 St. Moritz	Switzerland; Reto Götschi; Guido Acklin	Italy; Günther Huber; Antonio Tartaglia	United States; Brian Shimer; Robert Olesen
1999 Cortina d'Ampezzo	Italy; Günther Huber; Enrico Costa; Ubaldo Ranzi (Note: Ranzi replaced the injured Costa after the first heat of the 1999 event.)	Germany; Christoph Langen; Markus Zimmermann	France; Bruno Mingeon; Emmanuel Hostache
2000 Altenberg	Germany; Christoph Langen; Markus Zimmermann (3)	Germany; André Lange; René Hoppe	Switzerland; Christian Reich; Urs Aeberhand
2001 St. Moritz	Germany; Christoph Langen (5); Marco Jakobs	Switzerland; Reto Götschi; Cédric Grand	Switzerland; Martin Annen; Beat Hefti
2003 Lake Placid	Germany; André Lange; Kevin Kuske	Canada; Pierre Lueders; Giulio Zardo	Germany; René Spies; Franz Sagmeister
2004 Königssee	Canada; Pierre Lueders; Giulio Zardo	Germany; Christoph Langen; Markus Zimmermann	Germany; André Lange; Kevin Kuske
2005 Calgary	Canada; Pierre Lueders (2); Lascelles Brown	Germany; André Lange; Kevin Kuske	Switzerland; Martin Annen; Beat Hefti
2007 St. Moritz	Germany; André Lange; Kevin Kuske	Switzerland; Ivo Rüegg; Aleksandr Streltsov; Tommy Herzog (Note: Herzog replaced the injured Streltsov after the third heat of the 2007 event.)	Italy; Simone Bertazzo; Samuele Romanini
2008 Altenberg	Germany; André Lange (3); Kevin Kuske (3)	Germany; Thomas Florschuetz; Mirko Pätzold	Russia; Alexandr Zubkov; Alexey Voevoda
2009 Lake Placid	Switzerland; Ivo Rüegg; Cédric Grand	Germany; Thomas Florschütz; Marc Kühne	United States; Steven Holcomb; Curtis Tomasevicz
2011 Königssee	Russia; Alexandr Zubkov; Alexey Voevoda	Germany; Thomas Florschütz; Kevin Kuske	None awarded
2011 Königssee	Russia; Alexandr Zubkov; Alexey Voevoda	Germany; Manuel Machata; Andreas Bredau	None awarded
2012 Lake Placid	United States; Steven Holcomb; Steven Langton	Canada; Lyndon Rush; Jesse Lumsden	Germany; Maximilian Arndt; Kevin Kuske
2013 St. Moritz	Germany; Francesco Friedrich; Jannis Bäcker	Switzerland; Beat Hefti; Thomas Lamparter	Germany; Thomas Florschütz; Kevin Kuske; Andreas Bredau (Note: Bredau replaced the injured Kuske after the first heat of the 2013 event.)
2015 Winterberg	Germany; Francesco Friedrich; Thorsten Margis	Germany; Johannes Lochner; Joshua Bluhm	None awarded
2015 Winterberg	Germany; Francesco Friedrich; Thorsten Margis	Latvia; Oskars Melbārdis; Daumants Dreiškens	None awarded
2016 Igls	Germany; Francesco Friedrich; Thorsten Margis	Germany; Johannes Lochner; Joshua Bluhm	Switzerland; Beat Hefti; Alex Baumann
2017 Königssee	Germany; Francesco Friedrich; Thorsten Margis	Canada; Justin Kripps; Jesse Lumsden	Germany; Johannes Lochner; Joshua Bluhm
2019 Whistler	Germany; Francesco Friedrich; Thorsten Margis	Canada; Justin Kripps; Cameron Stones	Germany; Nico Walther; Paul Krenz
2020 Altenberg	Germany; Francesco Friedrich; Thorsten Margis (5)	Germany; Johannes Lochner; Christopher Weber	Latvia; Oskars Ķibermanis; Matīss Miknis
2021 Altenberg	Germany; Francesco Friedrich; Alexander Schüller	Germany; Johannes Lochner; Eric Franke	Germany; Hans-Peter Hannighofer; Christian Röder
2023 St. Moritz	Germany; Johannes Lochner; Georg Fleischhauer	Germany; Francesco Friedrich; Alexander Schüller	Switzerland; Michael Vogt; Sandro Michel
2024 Winterberg	Germany; Francesco Friedrich; Alexander Schüller	Germany; Adam Ammour; Issam Ammour	Germany; Johannes Lochner; Georg Fleischhauer
2025 Lake Placid	Germany; Francesco Friedrich **(9)**; Alexander Schüller (3)	Germany; Johannes Lochner; Georg Fleischhauer	Germany; Adam Ammour; Benedikt Hertel

Medal table

Rank	Nation	Gold	Silver	Bronze	Total
1	Germany	21	18	13	52
2	Switzerland	15	14	14	43
3	Italy	13	11	5	29
4	West Germany	4	6	5	15
5	East Germany	4	5	4	13
6	Canada	2	6	1	9
7	Great Britain	2	1	2	5
7	Romania	2	1	2	5
9	United States	1	4	7	12
10	Austria	1	1	3	5
11	Belgium	1	0	1	2
11	Russia	1	0	1	2
13	Czechoslovakia	0	2	0	2
14	Latvia	0	1	1	2
15	France	0	0	2	2
15	Soviet Union	0	0	2	2
17	Spain	0	0	1	1
Totals (17 entries)		**67**	**70**	**64**	**201**

=== Two-woman ===
Debuted: 2000.

Season	Gold	Silver	Bronze
2000 Winterberg	Germany; Gabriele Kohlisch; Kathleen Hering	United States; Jean Racine; Jennifer Davidson	Switzerland; Françoise Burdet; Katharina Sutter
2001 Calgary	Switzerland; Françoise Burdet; Katharina Sutter	United States; Jean Racine; Jennifer Davidson	Germany; Susi Erdmann; Tanja Hess
2003 Winterberg	Germany; Susi Erdmann; Annegret Dietrich	Germany; Sandra Prokoff; Ulrike Holzner	Germany; Cathleen Martini; Yvonne Cernota
2004 Königssee	Germany; Susi Erdmann (2); Kristina Bader	Germany; Sandra Prokoff; Anja Schneiderheinze	United States; Jean Racine; Vonetta Flowers
2005 Calgary	Germany; Sandra Kiriasis; Anja Schneiderheinze	Great Britain; Nicola Minichiello; Jackie Davies	United States; Shauna Rohbock; Valerie Fleming
2007 St. Moritz	Germany; Sandra Kiriasis; Romy Logsch	Germany; Cathleen Martini; Janine Tischer	United States; Shauna Rohbock; Valerie Fleming
2008 Altenberg	Germany; Sandra Kiriasis (3); Romy Logsch	Germany; Cathleen Martini; Janine Tischer	Germany; Claudia Schramm; Nicole Herschmann
2009 Lake Placid	Great Britain; Nicola Minichiello; Gillian Cooke	United States; Shauna Rohbock; Elana Meyers	Germany; Cathleen Martini; Janine Tischer
2011 Königssee	Germany; Cathleen Martini; Romy Logsch (3)	United States; Shauna Rohbock; Valerie Fleming	Canada; Kaillie Humphries; Heather Moyse
2012 Lake Placid	Canada; Kaillie Humphries; Jennifer Ciochetti	Germany; Sandra Kiriasis; Petra Lammert	United States; Elana Meyers; Katie Eberling
2013 St. Moritz	Canada; Kaillie Humphries; Chelsea Valois	United States; Elana Meyers; Katie Eberling	Germany; Sandra Kiriasis; Franziska Bertels
2015 Winterberg	United States; Elana Meyers Taylor; Cherrelle Garrett	Germany; Anja Schneiderheinze-Stöckel; Annika Drazek	Germany; Cathleen Martini; Stephanie Schneider
2016 Igls	Germany; Anja Schneiderheinze-Stöckel (2); Annika Drazek	Canada; Kaillie Humphries; Melissa Lotholz	United States; Elana Meyers Taylor; Lauren Gibbs
2017 Königssee	United States; Elana Meyers Taylor (2); Kehri Jones	Canada; Kaillie Humphries; Melissa Lotholz	United States; Jamie Greubel Poser; Aja Evans
2019 Whistler	Germany; Mariama Jamanka; Annika Drazek (2)	Germany; Stephanie Schneider; Ann-Christin Strack	Canada; Christine de Bruin; Kristen Bujnowski
2020 Altenberg	United States; Kaillie Humphries; Lauren Gibbs	Germany; Kim Kalicki; Kira Lipperheide	Canada; Christine de Bruin; Kristen Bujnowski
2021 Altenberg	United States; Kaillie Humphries **(4)**; Lolo Jones	Germany; Kim Kalicki; Ann-Christin Strack	Germany; Laura Nolte; Deborah Levi
2023 St. Moritz	Germany; Kim Kalicki; Leonie Fiebig	Germany; Lisa Buckwitz; Kira Lipperheide	United States; Kaillie Humphries; Kaysha Love
2024 Winterberg	Germany; Lisa Buckwitz; Vanessa Mark	Germany; Laura Nolte; Deborah Levi	Germany; Kim Kalicki; Leonie Fiebig
2025 Lake Placid	Germany; Laura Nolte; Deborah Levi	Germany; Kim Kalicki; Leonie Fiebig	Germany; Lisa Buckwitz; Kira Lipperheide

Medal table

Rank	Nation	Gold	Silver	Bronze	Total
1	Germany	12	12	9	33
2	United States	4	5	7	16
3	Canada	2	2	3	7
4	Great Britain	1	1	0	2
5	Switzerland	1	0	1	2
Totals (5 entries)		**20**	**20**	**20**	**60**

=== Women's Monobob ===
Debuted: 2021.

Season	Gold	Silver	Bronze
2021 Altenberg	Kaillie Humphries (USA)	Stephanie Schneider (GER)	Laura Nolte (GER)
2023 St. Moritz	Laura Nolte (GER)	Kaillie Humphries (USA)	Lisa Buckwitz (GER)
2024 Winterberg	Laura Nolte (GER) **(2)**	Elana Meyers Taylor (USA)	Lisa Buckwitz (GER)
2025 Lake Placid	Kaysha Love (USA)	Laura Nolte (GER)	Elana Meyers Taylor (USA)

Medal table

Rank	Nation	Gold	Silver	Bronze	Total
1	Germany	2	2	3	7
2	United States	2	2	1	5
Totals (2 entries)		**4**	**4**	**4**	**12**

== Skeleton ==
Numbers in brackets denotes number of victories in corresponding disciplines. Boldface denotes record number of victories.

=== Men ===
Debuted: 1982.

Season	Gold	Silver	Bronze
1982 St. Moritz	Gert Elsässer (AUT)	Nico Baracchi (SUI)	Alain Wicki (SUI)
1989 St. Moritz	Alain Wicki (SUI)	Christian Auer (AUT)	Franz Plangger (AUT)
1990 Königssee	Michael Grünberger (AUT)	Andi Schmid (AUT)	Gregor Stähli (SUI)
1991 Igls	Christian Auer (AUT)	Andi Schmid (AUT)	Michael Grünberger (AUT)
1992 Calgary	Bruce Sandford (NZL)	Gregor Stähli (SUI)	Christian Auer (AUT)
1993 La Plagne	Andi Schmid (AUT)	Franz Plangger (AUT)	Gregor Stähli (SUI)
1994 Altenberg	Gregor Stähli (SUI)	Andi Schmid (AUT)	Franz Plangger (AUT)
1995 Lillehammer	Jürg Wenger (SUI)	Christian Auer (AUT)	Ryan Davenport (CAN)
1996 Calgary	Ryan Davenport (CAN)	Franz Plangger (AUT)	Christian Auer (AUT)
1997 Lake Placid	Ryan Davenport (CAN) (2)	Jim Shea (USA)	Chris Soule (USA)
1998 St. Moritz	Willi Schneider (GER)	Alain Wicki (SUI)	Felix Poletti (SUI)
1999 Altenberg	Jim Shea (USA)	Andy Böhme (GER)	Willi Schneider (GER)
2000 Igls	Andy Böhme (GER)	Gregor Stähli (SUI)	Alexander Müller (AUT)
2000 Igls	Andy Böhme (GER)	Gregor Stähli (SUI)	Jim Shea (USA)
2001 Calgary	Martin Rettl (AUT)	Jeff Pain (CAN)	Lincoln DeWitt (USA)
2003 Nagano	Jeff Pain (CAN)	Chris Soule (USA)	Brady Canfield (USA)
2004 Königssee	Duff Gibson (CAN)	Florian Grassl (GER)	Frank Kleber (GER)
2005 Calgary	Jeff Pain (CAN) (2)	Gregor Stähli (SUI)	Duff Gibson (CAN)
2007 St. Moritz	Gregor Stähli (SUI)	Eric Bernotas (USA)	Zach Lund (USA)
2008 Altenberg	Kristan Bromley (GBR)	Jon Montgomery (CAN)	Frank Rommel (GER)
2009 Lake Placid	Gregor Stähli (SUI) (3)	Adam Pengilly (GBR)	Aleksandr Tretyakov (RUS)
2011 Königssee	Martins Dukurs (LAT)	Aleksandr Tretyakov (RUS)	Frank Rommel (GER)
2012 Lake Placid	Martins Dukurs (LAT)	Frank Rommel (GER)	Ben Sandford (NZL)
2013 St. Moritz	Aleksandr Tretyakov (RUS)	Martins Dukurs (LAT)	Sergey Chudinov (RUS)
2015 Winterberg	Martins Dukurs (LAT)	Aleksandr Tretyakov (RUS)	Tomass Dukurs (LAT)
2016 Igls	Martins Dukurs (LAT)	Aleksandr Tretyakov (RUS)	None awarded
2016 Igls	Martins Dukurs (LAT)	Yun Sung-bin (KOR)	None awarded
2017 Königssee	Martins Dukurs (LAT)	Axel Jungk (GER)	Nikita Tregubov (RUS)
2019 Whistler	Martins Dukurs (LAT) **(6)**	Nikita Tregubov (RUS)	Yun Sung-bin (KOR)
2020 Altenberg	Christopher Grotheer (GER)	Axel Jungk (GER)	Alexander Gassner (GER)
2021 Altenberg	Christopher Grotheer (GER)	Aleksandr Tretyakov (BFR)	Alexander Gassner (GER)
2023 St. Moritz	Matt Weston (GBR)	Amedeo Bagnis (ITA)	Jung Seung-gi (KOR)
2024 Winterberg	Christopher Grotheer (GER) (3)	Matt Weston (GBR)	Yin Zheng (CHN)
2025 Lake Placid	Matt Weston (GBR) (2)	Marcus Wyatt (GBR)	Axel Jungk (GER)

Medal table

Rank	Nation	Gold	Silver	Bronze	Total
1	Latvia	6	1	1	8
2	Austria	5	7	6	18
3	Germany	5	5	7	17
4	Switzerland	5	5	4	14
5	Canada	5	2	2	9
6	Great Britain	3	3	0	6
7	Russia	1	4	3	8
8	United States	1	3	5	9
9	New Zealand	1	0	1	2
10	South Korea	0	1	2	3
11	Bobsleigh Federation of Russia	0	1	0	1
11	Italy	0	1	0	1
13	China	0	0	1	1
Totals (13 entries)		**32**	**33**	**32**	**97**

=== Women ===
Debuted: 2000.

Season	Gold	Silver	Bronze
2000 Igls	Steffi Hanzlik (GER)	Mellisa Hollingsworth (CAN)	Tricia Stumpf (USA)
2001 Calgary	Maya Pedersen (SUI)	Alex Coomber (GBR)	Tricia Stumpf (USA)
2003 Nagano	Michelle Kelly (CAN)	Yekaterina Mironova (RUS)	Tristan Gale (USA)
2004 Königssee	Diane Sartor (GER)	Lindsay Alcock (CAN)	Kerstin Jürgens (GER)
2005 Calgary	Maya Pedersen (SUI) (2)	Noelle Pikus-Pace (USA)	Michelle Kelly (CAN)
2007 St. Moritz	Noelle Pikus-Pace (USA)	Maya Pedersen (SUI)	Katie Uhlaender (USA)
2008 Altenberg	Anja Huber (GER)	Katie Uhlaender (USA)	Kerstin Jürgens (GER)
2009 Lake Placid	Marion Trott (GER)	Amy Williams (GBR)	Kerstin Szymkowiak (GER)
2011 Königssee	Marion Thees (GER) (2)	Anja Huber (GER)	Mellisa Hollingsworth (CAN)
2012 Lake Placid	Katie Uhlaender (USA)	Mellisa Hollingsworth (CAN)	Lizzy Yarnold (GBR)
2013 St. Moritz	Shelley Rudman (GBR)	Noelle Pikus-Pace (USA)	Sarah Reid (CAN)
2015 Winterberg	Lizzy Yarnold (GBR)	Jacqueline Lölling (GER)	Elisabeth Vathje (CAN)
2016 Igls	Tina Hermann (GER)	Janine Flock (AUT)	Elena Nikitina (RUS)
2017 Königssee	Jacqueline Lölling (GER)	Tina Hermann (GER)	Lizzy Yarnold (GBR)
2019 Whistler	Tina Hermann (GER)	Jacqueline Lölling (GER)	Sophia Griebel (GER)
2020 Altenberg	Tina Hermann (GER)	Marina Gilardoni (SUI)	Janine Flock (AUT)
2021 Altenberg	Tina Hermann (GER) **(4)**	Jacqueline Lölling (GER)	Elena Nikitina (BFR)
2023 St. Moritz	Susanne Kreher (GER)	Kimberley Bos (NED)	Mirela Rahneva (CAN)
2024 Winterberg	Hallie Clarke (CAN)	Kim Meylemans (BEL)	Hannah Neise (GER)
2025 Lake Placid	Kimberley Bos (NED)	Mystique Ro (USA)	Anna Fernstädt (CZE)

Medal table

Rank	Nation	Gold	Silver	Bronze	Total
1	Germany	11	5	5	21
2	United States	2	4	4	10
3	Canada	2	3	5	10
4	Great Britain	2	2	2	6
5	Switzerland	2	2	0	4
6	Netherlands	1	1	0	2
7	Austria	0	1	1	2
7	Russia	0	1	1	2
9	Belgium	0	1	0	1
10	Bobsleigh Federation of Russia	0	0	1	1
10	Czech Republic	0	0	1	1
Totals (11 entries)		**20**	**20**	**20**	**60**

=== Mixed team ===
Debuted: 2020.

Season	Gold	Silver	Bronze
2020 Altenberg	Germany; Jacqueline Lölling; Alexander Gassner	Canada; Jane Channell; Dave Greszczyszyn	Italy; Valentina Margaglio; Mattia Gaspari
2021 Altenberg	Germany; Tina Hermann; Christopher Grotheer	Germany; Jacqueline Lölling; Alexander Gassner	Bobsleigh Federation of Russia; Elena Nikitina; Aleksandr Tretyakov
2023 St. Moritz	Germany; Susanne Kreher; Christopher Grotheer	Great Britain; Laura Deas; Matt Weston	Great Britain; Brogan Crowley; Craig Thompson
2024 Winterberg	Germany; Hannah Neise; Christopher Grotheer **(3)**	Great Britain; Tabitha Stoecker; Matt Weston	Germany; Jacqueline Pfeifer; Axel Jungk
2025 Lake Placid	United States; Mystique Ro; Austin Florian	Great Britain; Tabitha Stoecker; Matt Weston	China; Zhao Dan; Lin Qinwei

Medal table

Rank	Nation	Gold	Silver	Bronze	Total
1	Germany	4	1	1	6
2	United States	1	0	0	1
3	Great Britain	0	3	1	4
4	Canada	0	1	0	1
5	Bobsleigh Federation of Russia	0	0	1	1
5	China	0	0	1	1
5	Italy	0	0	1	1
Totals (7 entries)		**5**	**5**	**5**	**15**

== Mixed team (bobsleigh and skeleton) ==
Debuted: 2007. Discontinued: 2019.

Numbers in brackets denotes number of victories in corresponding disciplines. Boldface denotes record number of victories.

Season	Gold	Silver	Bronze
2007 St. Moritz	Germany; Frank Kleber; Sandra Kiriasis; Berit Wiacker; Monique Riekewald; Karl Angerer; Marc Kühne	United States; Eric Bernotas; Erin Pac; Emily Azevedo; Noelle Pikus-Pace; Mike Kohn; Curtis Tomasevicz	Switzerland; Gregor Stähli; Sabrina Hafner; Katharina Sutter; Maya Pedersen; Ivo Rüegg; Thomas Lamparter
2008 Altenberg	Germany; Sebastian Haupt; Sandra Kiriasis; Berit Wiacker (2); Anja Huber; Matthias Höpfner; Alex Mann	Canada; Jon Montgomery; Kaillie Humphries; Jenni Hucul; Michelle Kelly; Lyndon Rush; Nathan Cross	United States; Zach Lund; Erin Pac; Emily Azevedo; Katie Uhlaender; Steven Holcomb; Curtis Tomasevicz
2009 Lake Placid	Germany; Frank Rommel; Sandra Kiriasis; Patricia Polifka; Marion Trott; Thomas Florschütz; Andreas Barucha	Switzerland; Gregor Stähli; Sabrina Hafner; Anne Dietrich; Maya Pedersen; Ivo Rüegg; Cédric Grand	United States; Eric Bernotas; Shauna Rohbock; Valerie Fleming; Katie Uhlaender; Steven Holcomb; Justin Olsen
2011 Königssee	Germany; Michi Halilović; Sandra Kiriasis **(4)**; Stephanie Schneider; Marion Thees (2); Francesco Friedrich; Florian Becke	Germany; Frank Rommel; Cathleen Martini; Kristin Steinert; Anja Huber; Karl Angerer; Alex Mann	Canada; Jon Montgomery; Kaillie Humphries; Heather Moyse; Mellisa Hollingsworth; Lyndon Rush; Cody Sorensen
2012 Lake Placid	United States; Matthew Antoine; Elana Meyers; Emily Azevedo; Katie Uhlaender; Steven Holcomb; Justin Olsen	Germany; Frank Rommel; Sandra Kiriasis; Berit Wiacker; Marion Thees; Maximilian Arndt; Steven Deja	Canada; John Fairbairn; Kaillie Humphries; Emily Baadsvik; Mellisa Hollingsworth; Justin Kripps; Timothy Randall
2013 St. Moritz	United States; John Daly; Elana Meyers (2); Lolo Jones; Noelle Pikus-Pace; Steven Holcomb (2); Curtis Tomasevicz	Germany; Frank Rommel; Sandra Kiriasis; Sarah Noll; Marion Thees; Francesco Friedrich; Gino Gerhardi	Canada; Eric Neilson; Kaillie Humphries; Chelsea Valois; Sarah Reid; Lyndon Rush; Cody Sorensen
2015 Winterberg	Germany; Axel Jungk; Cathleen Martini; Lisette Thöne; Tina Hermann; Francesco Friedrich (2); Martin Grothkopp	Germany; Christopher Grotheer; Anja Schneiderheinze-Stöckel; Franziska Bertels; Anja Selbach; Johannes Lochner; Gregor Bermbach	Canada; Dave Greszczyszyn; Kaillie Humphries; Kate O'Brien; Elisabeth Vathje; Justin Kripps; Alexander Kopacz
2016 Igls	Germany; Axel Jungk; Anja Schneiderheinze-Stöckel; Franziska Bertels; Tina Hermann (2); Johannes Lochner; Tino Paasche	Austria; Matthias Guggenberger; Christina Hengster; Sanne Dekker; Janine Flock; Benjamin Maier; Dănuț Moldovan	Germany; Michael Zachrau; Stephanie Schneider; Anne Lobenstein; Jacqueline Lölling; Nico Walther; Jannis Bäcker
2017 Königssee	Germany; Axel Jungk (3); Mariama Jamanka; Franziska Bertels (2); Jacqueline Lölling; Johannes Lochner; Christian Rasp	Germany; Christopher Grotheer; Stephanie Schneider; Lisa Buckwitz; Tina Hermann; Nico Walther; Philipp Wobeto	International (Germany) Alexander Gassner (Romania) Maria Constantin (Romania) Andreea Grecu (Germany) Anna Fernstädt (Germany) Richard Ölsner (Germany) Marc Rademacher
2019 Whistler	Germany; Christopher Grotheer; Anna Köhler; Lisa Sophie Gericke; Sophia Griebel; Johannes Lochner (3); Marc Rademacher	Canada; Dave Greszczyszyn; Christine de Bruin; Kristen Bujnowski; Mirela Rahneva; Nick Poloniato; Keefer Joyce	United States; Greg West; Brittany Reinbolt; Jessica Davis; Savannah Graybill; Geoffrey Gadbois; Kristopher Horn

Medal table

Rank	Nation	Gold	Silver	Bronze	Total
1	Germany	8	5	1	14
2	United States	2	1	3	6
3	Canada	0	2	4	6
4	Switzerland	0	1	1	2
5	Austria	0	1	0	1
6	International	0	0	1	1
Totals (6 entries)		**10**	**10**	**10**	**30**

== IBSF World Championships overall medal count ==
- Updated after the IBSF World Championships 2025.

Rank	Nation	Gold	Silver	Bronze	Total
1	Germany	87	62	52	201
2	Switzerland	39	35	35	109
3	United States	19	23	36	78
4	Italy	18	19	7	44
5	Canada	12	17	18	47
6	West Germany	10	13	12	35
7	Great Britain	10	12	7	29
8	East Germany	8	10	7	25
9	Latvia	7	4	4	15
10	Austria	6	15	15	36
11	Russia	2	8	6	16
12	Romania	2	2	2	6
13	Belgium	1	2	1	4
14	Netherlands	1	1	0	2
15	France	1	0	4	5
16	New Zealand	1	0	1	2
17	Czechoslovakia	0	2	0	2
18	Bobsleigh Federation of Russia	0	1	2	3
18	South Korea	0	1	2	3
20	China	0	0	2	2
20	Soviet Union	0	0	2	2
20	Sweden	0	0	2	2
23	Czech Republic	0	0	1	1
23	International	0	0	1	1
23	Spain	0	0	1	1
Totals (25 entries)		224	227	220	671

== Multiple medalists ==
Boldface denotes active athletes and highest medal count among all athletes (including these who not included in these tables) per type. "Position" denotes position of bobsledder in a crew (P – bobsledder won all own medals as a pilot; B – bobsledder won all own medals as a brakeman / brakewoman and / or as a pusher; B/P – bobsledder won own medals firstly as a brakeman / brakewoman and / or as a pusher and then as a pilot).

=== Men's bobsleigh ===
Rank	Bobsledder	Country	From	To	Gold	Silver	Bronze	Total	Position
1	**Francesco Friedrich**	Germany	2011	2025	**18**	3	–	**21**	P
2	**Thorsten Margis**	Germany	2015	2024	10	1	–	11	B
3	Eugenio Monti	Italy	1957	1966	9	1	–	10	P
4	André Lange	Germany	2000	2009	8	4	2	14	P
5	Christoph Langen	Germany	1991	2004	8	4	–	12	B/P
6	**Alexander Schüller**	Germany	2020	2025	8	1	–	9	B
7	Kevin Kuske	Germany	2003	2012	7	4	4 *	15 *	B
8	Erich Schärer	Switzerland	1971	1986	7	3	4	14	B/P
9	Fritz Feierabend	Switzerland	1935	1955	6	3	3	12	B/P
10	Wolfgang Hoppe	East Germany; Germany	1983	1997	6	2	**6**	14	P

* not including one medal in the Two-man event at the 2013 World Championships as he was replaced due to injury after the first of four heats

=== Women's bobsleigh ===
Rank	Bobsledder	Country	From	To	Gold	Silver	Bronze	Total	Position
1	Sandra Kiriasis (Prokoff)	Germany	2003	2013	**7**	**5**	1	13	P
2	**Kaillie Humphries**	Canada; United States	2008	2023	5	4	**6**	**15**	P
3	**Elana Meyers Taylor**	United States	2009	2025	4	3	3	10	B/P
4	Anja Schneiderheinze-Stöckel	Germany	2004	2016	3	3	–	6	B/P
5	**Laura Nolte**	Germany	2021	2025	3	2	2	7	P
6	Romy Logsch	Germany	2007	2011	3	–	–	3	B
7	Cathleen Martini	Germany	2003	2015	2	3	3	8	P
8	Franziska Bertels	Germany	2013	2017	2	1	1	4	B
9	Annika Drazek	Germany	2015	2019	2	1	–	3	B
9	Berit Wiacker	Germany	2007	2012	2	1	–	3	B

=== Men's skeleton ===
Rank	Racer	Country	From	To	Gold	Silver	Bronze	Total
1	**Christopher Grotheer**	Germany	2015	2024	**7**	2	–	9
2	Martins Dukurs	Latvia	2011	2019	6	1	–	7
3	Gregor Stähli	Switzerland	1990	2009	3	**4**	**3**	**10**
4	**Axel Jungk**	Germany	2015	2025	3	2	2	7
5	**Matt Weston**	Great Britain	2023	2025	2	**4**	–	6
6	Jeff Pain	Canada	2001	2005	2	1	–	3
7	Ryan Davenport	Canada	1995	1997	2	–	1	3
8	Frank Rommel	Germany	2008	2013	1	**4**	2	7
8	**Aleksandr Tretyakov**	Russia; Bobsleigh Federation of Russia	2009	2021	1	**4**	2	7
10	Andi Schmid	Austria	1990	1994	1	3	–	4

=== Women's skeleton ===
Rank	Racer	Country	From	To	Gold	Silver	Bronze	Total
1	Tina Hermann	Germany	2015	2021	**7**	2	–	**9**
2	Marion Thees (Trott)	Germany	2009	2013	4	2	–	6
3	**Jacqueline Pfeifer (Lölling)**	Germany	2015	2024	3	**4**	2	**9**
4	Noelle Pikus-Pace	United States	2005	2013	2	3	–	5
4	Anja Selbach (Huber)	Germany	2008	2015	2	3	–	5
6	Maya Pedersen	Switzerland	2001	2009	2	2	1	5
7	**Katie Uhlaender**	United States	2007	2012	2	1	**3**	6
8	**Susanne Kreher**	Germany	2023	2023	2	–	–	2
9	Michelle Kelly	Canada	2003	2008	1	1	1	3
10	**Kimberley Bos**	Netherlands	2023	2025	1	1	–	2
10	**Mystique Ro**	United States	2025	2025	1	1	–	2
