= FIBT World Championships 2001 =

Bobsleigh and skeleton competition

2001 World Championships
- Location: St. Moritz, Switzerland; Calgary, Alberta, Canada

The FIBT World Championships 2001 took place in St. Moritz, Switzerland (Men's bobsleigh) and Calgary, Alberta, Canada (Women's bobsleigh, and men's and women's Skeleton). The Swiss city had hosted the event for the record twentieth time, doing so previously in 1931 (Four-man), 1935 (Four-man), 1937 (Four-man), 1938 (Two-man), 1939 (Two-man), 1947, 1955, 1957, 1959, 1965, 1970, 1974, 1977, 1982, 1987, 1989 (Skeleton), 1990 (Bobsleigh), 1997 (Bobsleigh), and 1998 (Skeleton). Calgary hosted the championship event for the third time, doing so previously in 1992 (Skeleton) and 1996.

== Bobsleigh ==
=== Two man ===
Pos	Team	Time
Gold	Germany (Christoph Langen, Marco Jakobs)	
Silver	Switzerland (Reto Götschi, Cédric Grand)	
Bronze	Switzerland (Martin Annen, Beat Hefti)	

=== Four man ===
Pos	Team	Time
Gold	Germany (Christoph Langen, Markus Zimmermann, Sven Peter, Alex Metzger)	
Silver	Germany (André Lange, Lars Behrendt. René Hoppe, Carsten Embach)	
Bronze	Switzerland (Christian Reich, Steve Anderhub, Urs Aeberhand, Domenic Keller)	

=== Two woman ===
Pos	Team	Time
Gold	Switzerland (Françoise Burdet, Katharina Sutter)	
Silver	United States (Jean Racine, Jennifer Davidson)	
Bronze	Germany (Susi Erdmann, Tanja Hess)	

== Skeleton ==
=== Men ===
Pos	Athlete	Time
Gold	Martin Rettl (AUT)	
Silver	Jeff Pain (CAN)	
Bronze	Lincoln DeWitt (USA)	

=== Women ===
Pos	Athlete	Time
Gold	Maya Pedersen (SUI)	
Silver	Alex Coomber (GBR)	
Bronze	Tricia Stumpf (USA)	

Coomber earned the first medal for Great Britain at the championships since 1966.

== Medal table ==
Rank	Nation	Gold	Silver	Bronze	Total
1	Switzerland (SUI)	2	1	2	5
2	Germany (GER)	2	1	1	4
3	Austria (AUT)	1	0	0	1
4	United States (USA)	0	1	2	3
5	Canada (CAN)	0	1	0	1
5	Great Britain (GBR)	0	1	0	1
Totals (6 entries)		5	5	5	15
