= Bobsleigh at the 1972 Winter Olympics =

Bobsleigh at the XI Olympic Winter Games
- Venue: Sapporo Teine
- Dates: 4–12 February 1972
- Competitors: 79 from 11 nations

Bobsleigh at the 1972 Winter Olympics consisted of two events, at Sapporo Teine. The competition took place between 4 and 12 February 1972.

== Medal summary ==
=== Medal table ===
Rank	Nation	Gold	Silver	Bronze	Total
1	West Germany	1	1	1	3
2	Switzerland	1	0	1	2
3	Italy	0	1	0	1
Totals (3 entries)		2	2	2	6

Three countries won medals in Sapporo, West Germany leading the medal table.

=== Events ===
Event	Gold		Silver		Bronze	
Two-man	West Germany (FRG-2); Wolfgang Zimmerer; Peter Utzschneider	4:57.07	West Germany (FRG-1); Horst Floth; Pepi Bader	4:58.84	Switzerland (SUI-1); Jean Wicki; Edy Hubacher	4:59.33
Four-man	Switzerland (SUI-1); Jean Wicki; Hans Leutenegger; Werner Camichel; Edy Hubacher	4:43.07	Italy (ITA-1); Nevio de Zordo; Adriano Frassinelli; Corrado dal Fabbro; Gianni Bonichon	4:43.83	West Germany (FRG-1); Wolfgang Zimmerer; Stefan Gaisreiter; Walter Steinbauer; Peter Utzschneider	4:43.92

== Participating NOCs ==
Eleven nations participated in bobsleigh at the 1972 Games. Japan made their Olympic bobsleigh debut.

- Austria (8)
- Canada (6)
- France (6)
- West Germany (8)
- Great Britain (8)
- Italy (9)
- Japan (8)
- Romania (5)
- Switzerland (8)
- Sweden (4)
- United States (9)
