= Hans Schmidt (bobsleigh) =

German bobsledder

Medal record

Men's Bobsleigh

Representing Germany

World Championships
Bronze medal – third place	1939 Cortina d'Ampezzo	Four-man

Hans Schmidt was a German bobsledder who competed in the late 1930s. He won the bronze medal in the four-man event at the 1939 FIBT World Championships in Cortina d'Ampezzo.
