= Righini =

Righini is an Italian surname. Notable people with the surname include:

- Alberto Righini, Italian bobsledder
- Pietro Righini (1683–1742), Italian architect
- Vincenzo Righini (1756–1812), Italian composer
- Alessandro Cassinis Righini, (1965—), management consultant, Vatican auditor general

== See also ==
- 9427 Righini, a main-belt asteroid
