= Donald Fox =

Donald or Don Fox may refer to:

- Donald Fox (bobsleigh), American bobsledder
- Don Fox (1935–2008), English rugby league player
- Donald W. Fox (born 1922), American politician
