= Frederick McEvoy =

Australian socialite (1902–1951)

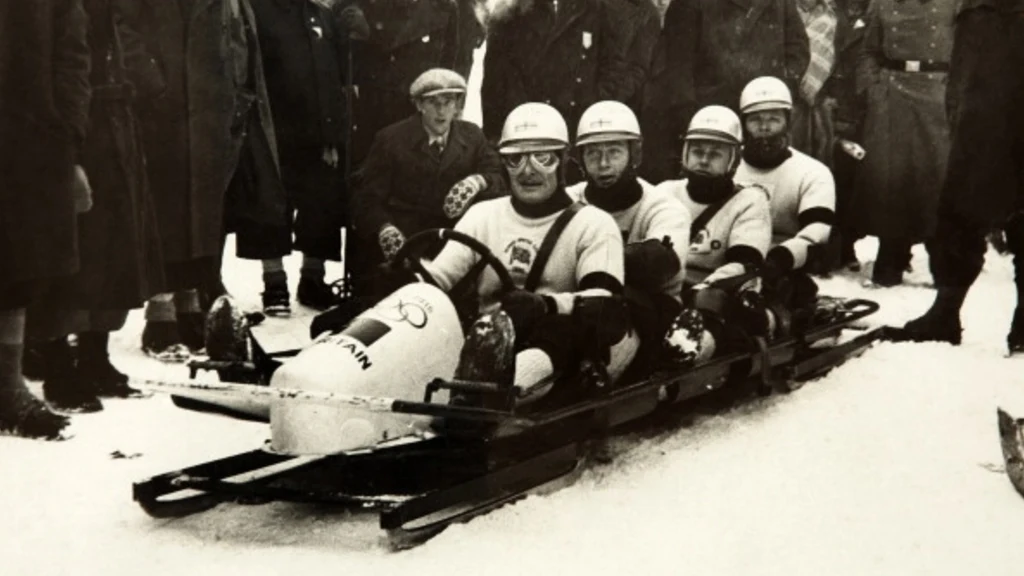

Personal information
- Born: Frederick Joseph McEvoy; 12 February 1907 St Kilda, Victoria, Australia
- Died: 7 November 1951 (aged 44) off the coast of Morocco

Champ Car career
- 1 race run over 1 year
- Best finish: 26th (1936)
- First race: 1936 Vanderbilt Cup (Westbury)
Wins	Podiums	Poles
0	0	0
Medal record
Representing Great Britain
Men's bobsleigh
Olympic Games
Bronze medal – third place	1936 Garmisch-Partenkirchen	Four-man
World Championships
Gold medal – first place	1937 Cortina d'Ampezzo	Two-man
Gold medal – first place	1937 St. Moritz	Four-man
Gold medal – first place	1938 Garmisch-Partenkirchen	Four-man
Silver medal – second place	1938 St. Moritz	Two-man
Silver medal – second place	1939 Cortina d'Ampezzo	Four-man

Frederick Joseph McEvoy (12 February 1907 – 7 November 1951) was an Australian and British multi-discipline sportsman and socialite. He had most sporting success as a bobsledder in the late 1930s, winning several medals including three golds at the FIBT World Championships. He married three wealthy heiresses and was a close friend of Errol Flynn. He often shortened his name to Freddie McEvoy and was nicknamed "Suicide Freddie".

== Sporting achievements ==
=== Bobsleigh ===
McEvoy was the British flag bearer at the 1936 Winter Olympics in Garmisch-Partenkirchen, Germany. He was the first Australian to win a Winter Olympics medal.

McEvoy was part of the four-man bobsleigh team alongside James Cardno, Gary Dugdale, and Charles Green who won the bronze medal in the four-man event. He also finished fourth in the two-man event with Cardno.

At the FIBT World Championships in 1937, McEvoy realised greater success in the sport. Partnering Byran Black for the two-man at Cortina d'Ampezzo, Italy he achieved his first gold medal. He teamed up with Black, Olympic team-mate Charles Green, and David Looker in the four-man, again winning the gold medal.

At the same event in 1938 three of the four-man riders returned to defend their title. Chris MacKintosh replaced Byran Black and the team once again won the gold medal. In the two-man race Charles Green partnered McEvoy and the pair won the silver medal. Both men partnered again the following year and, alongside two new team-mates, won silver in the four-man event at Cortina d'Ampezzo.

=== Motor racing ===
McEvoy came sixth in the American Automobile Association (AAA) sanctioned 1936 Vanderbilt Cup, held at Roosevelt Raceway near New York City, and "considered by European road veterans to be probably the most severe test for man and car in the world". Despite starting and finishing the 75-lap event, McEvoy drove for less than one-third of the race; Italian motor racer Carlo Felice Trossi relieved McEvoy for 51 laps of the event, and ended the race scoring more points than McEvoy under the AAA's mileage-based points system.

That same year McEvoy entered eight European races, usually driving a Maserati 6CM, with his best result of fourth place at both the XII Picardie on 21 June and the XII Coppa Acerbo on 15 August.

== Other activities ==
In 1943, McEvoy lived in Hollywood and was able to make uncredited appearances in two films. The first was in Thank Your Lucky Stars a scene starring good friend Errol Flynn in his only musical number. McEvoy's only other appearance was in The Desert Song, directed by Robert Florey.

There have been claims that McEvoy was an antisemite who covertly worked for the Third Reich. The FBI, who had him under surveillance along with several of his friends and associates, described him as "an international pimp who is interested in his own well-being and probably not engaged in activities detrimental to the interests of the country."

Throughout 1944, McEvoy was believed to have smuggled guns, valuable jewellery, and alcohol from Mexico City to Beverly Hills.

McEvoy is said to have sold the shirt off his back for $2000 to an Argentine millionaire, "launch[ing] the fashion of flowered shirts for men".

== Personal life ==
McEvoy was born in St Kilda, Victoria, Australia, on 12 February 1907, the son of New Zealand-born Violet Healy and Melbourne native Frederick Aloysius McEvoy. After the death of his father the family moved to England early in his life. McEvoy was given the nickname of "Suicide Freddie" because of his love of danger both in life and in sport. He was a rival of fellow racing driver and playboy Porfirio Rubirosa.

=== Marriage and relationships ===
McEvoy was described by newspapers as an "internationally known Australian playboy" and a "popular, handsome, heiress hunter". McEvoy considered himself, along with Rubirosa, the "Playboy of the Western World" and was rumoured to be very well endowed which may have been part of the allure to his female conquests.

McEvoy was married several times, taking his first wife in 1940. Beatrice Cartwright, a member of the Pratt family and heir to a fortune from Standard Oil, was twice his age and had lived with McEvoy for several years before their marriage. The union did not last, and in 1942 Cartwright accused McEvoy of being unfaithful with "three well-known society women". The divorce was granted on the grounds of misconduct. McEvoy was not present for the decision as he was embroiled in a statutory rape case that had been opened against close friend Errol Flynn. 17-year-old Betty Hansen had accused Flynn of committing the offence during a party at McEvoy's Bel Air home, but McEvoy continued to publicly defend Flynn.

In February 1943, McEvoy married Irene Margaret Wrightsman, the daughter of Charles B. Wrightsman, the president of Standard Oil of Kansas. Wrightsman was 18 at the time of their wedding, nearly half his age. Wrightsman was disinherited by her father after she eloped and the marriage lasted just two years.

In 1945 he met Barbara Hutton, another wealthy heiress who had just divorced third husband Cary Grant. Hutton was warned to stay away from McEvoy by friends and relatives and they assumed that the pair would marry as soon as he "legally divorces penniless Irene". The couple were never wed, though Hutton bought a chalet at a ski resort in Franconia, New Hampshire, and they lived together for a time. Hutton married again in 1947 and she remained friends with McEvoy who went on to marry Claude Stephanie Filatre, a French fashion model, in 1949.

Errol Flynn married Patrice Wymore at a ceremony in Monte Carlo in 1950 with McEvoy as his best man and Filatre as the matron of honour. At the time McEvoy was said to have been living in Cannes aboard his schooner Black Joke.

== Death ==
McEvoy, his wife, and several others were sailing from Tangier to the Bahamas on his 104-ton schooner, Kangaroo, on 7 November 1951. Just off the coast of Morocco a storm wrecked the ship and McEvoy swam to shore to look for help, leaving Claude Stephanie afloat on the mast. He was unable to find any assistance and returned to his wife. The pair tried to swim back to land but the waves were too strong. Their bodies and those of four others were discovered the following day. One of the three survivors gave the name of Walter Praxmarer but was identified as Manfred Lenther, an Austrian man charged with murdering a woman in Berlin in 1945.
