= Jennifer Davidson =

Jennifer Davidson may refer to:

- Jennifer Davidson (bobsledder), American bobsledder who competed in the early 2000s
- Jennifer Davidson (executive) (1969–2007), television executive who was part of Cartoon Network
