= FIBT World Championships 1959 =

Winter sport competition

1959 World Championships
- Location: St. Moritz, Switzerland

The FIBT World Championships 1959 took place in St. Moritz, Switzerland for the record ninth time. The Swiss city had hosted the event previously in 1931 (Four-man), 1935 (Four-man), 1937 (Four-man), 1938 (Two-man), 1939 (Two-man), 1947, 1955, and 1957.

== Two man bobsleigh ==
Pos	Team	Time
Gold	Italy (Eugenio Monti, Renzo Alverà)	
Silver	Italy (Sergio Zardini, Sergio Siorpaes)	
Bronze	United States (Arthur Tyler, Thomas Butler)	

== Four man bobsleigh ==
Pos	Team	Time
Gold	United States (Arthur Tyler, Gary Sheffield, Parker Vooris, Thomas Butler)	
Silver	Italy (Sergio Zardini, Alberto Righini, Ferruccio Dalla Torre, Romano Bonagura)	
Bronze	West Germany (Franz Schelle, Eduard Kaltenberger, Josef Sterff, Otto Göbl)	

This was the last American bobsleigh gold medal at the world championships until 2009.

== Medal table ==
Rank	Nation	Gold	Silver	Bronze	Total
1	Italy (ITA)	1	2	0	3
2	United States (USA)	1	0	1	2
3	West Germany (FRG)	0	0	1	1
Totals (3 entries)		2	2	2	6
