= Eduard Kaltenberger =

West German bobsledder

Medal record

Men's Bobsleigh

Representing West Germany

World Championships
Silver medal – second place	1958 Garmisch-Partenkirchen	Four-man
Bronze medal – third place	1959 St. Moritz	Four-man

Eduard Kaltenberger was a West German bobsledder who competed in the late 1950s. He won two medals in the four-man event at the FIBT World Championships with a silver in 1958 and a bronze in 1959.
