= Alfred Hammer =

German bobsledder

Medal record

Men's Bobsleigh

Representing West Germany

World Championships
Gold medal – first place	1958 Garmisch-Partenkirchen	Four-man
Silver medal – second place	1960 Cortina d'Ampezzo	Four-man

Alfred Hammer was a West German bobsledder who competed in the late 1950s and the early 1960s. He won two medals in the four-man event at the FIBT World Championships with a gold in 1958 and a silver in 1960.
