= Renzo Alverà =

Italian bobsledder (1933–2005)

Medal record

Bobsleigh

Representing Italy

Olympic Games
Silver medal – second place	1956 Cortina d'Ampezzo	Two-man
Silver medal – second place	1956 Cortina d'Ampezzo	Four-man

World Championships
Gold medal – first place	1957 St. Moritz	Two-man
Gold medal – first place	1958 Garmisch-Partenkirchen	Two-man
Gold medal – first place	1959 St. Moritz	Two-man
Gold medal – first place	1960 Cortina d'Ampezzo	Two-man
Gold medal – first place	1960 Cortina d'Ampezzo	Four-man
Gold medal – first place	1961 Lake Placid	Four-man
Silver medal – second place	1957 St. Moritz	Four-man

Renzo Alverà (17 January 1933 – 15 March 2005) was an Italian bobsledder who competed from the mid-1950s to the early 1960s. At the 1956 Winter Olympics in Cortina d'Ampezzo, he won silver medals in the two-man and four-man events. He was born in Cortina d'Ampezzo.

Alvera also won seven medals at the FIBT World Championships with six golds (Two-man: 1957, 1958, 1959, 1960; Four-man: 1960, 1961) and one silver (Four-man: 1957).
