= Otto Göbl =

West German bobsledder

Medal record

Men's Bobsleigh

Representing West Germany

World Championships
Gold medal – first place	1962 Garmisch-Partenkirchen	Four-man
Silver medal – second place	1958 Garmisch-Partenkirchen	Four-man
Silver medal – second place	1960 Cortina d'Ampezzo	Two-man
Bronze medal – third place	1959 St. Moritz	Four-man

Otto Göbl (16 September 1936 – 17 July 2009) was a West German bobsledder who competed from the late 1950s to the early 1960s. He won four medals at the FIBT World Championships, taking home one gold (Four-man: 1962), two silvers (Two-man: 1960, four-man: 1958), and one bronze (Four-man: 1959). Göbl also finished fifth in the four-man event at the 1964 Winter Olympics in Innsbruck.
