= Franz Schelle =

West German bobsledder

Medal record

Men's Bobsleigh

Representing West Germany

World Championships
Gold medal – first place	1962 Garmisch-Partenkirchen	Four-man
Silver medal – second place	1958 Garmisch-Partenkirchen	Four-man
Silver medal – second place	1960 Cortina d'Ampezzo	Two-man
Bronze medal – third place	1955 St. Moritz	Four-man
Bronze medal – third place	1959 St. Moritz	Four-man

Franz Schelle (17 June 1929 – 23 January 2017) was a West German bobsledder who competed from the mid-1950s to the mid-1960s. He won five medals at the FIBT World Championships with one gold (Four-man: 1962), two silvers (Two-man: 1960, Four-man: 1958), and two bronzes (Four-man: 1955, 1959). Competing in two Winter Olympics, Schelle's best finish was fifth in the four-man event at Innsbruck in 1964.
