= Hans Rösch =

German bobsledder

Medal record

Men's bobsleigh

Representing West Germany

World Championships
Gold medal – first place	1958 Garmisch-Partenkirchen	Four-man
Silver medal – second place	1954 Cortina d'Ampezzo	Four-man
Silver medal – second place	1960 Cortina d'Ampezzo	Four-man
Bronze medal – third place	1953 Garmisch-Partenkirchen	Four-man

Hans Rösch (24 December 1914 – 14 May 1980) was a West German bobsledder who competed from the early 1950s to the early 1960s. He won four medals in the four-man event at the FIBT World Championships with one gold (1958), two silvers (1954, 1960), and one bronze (1953, tied with Sweden).

Rösch also finished sixth in the four-man event at the 1956 Winter Olympics in Cortina d'Ampezzo.
