= Werner Windhaus =

German bobsledder

Medal record

Men's Bobsleigh

Representing Germany

World Championships
Silver medal – second place	1938 Garmisch-Partenkirchen	Four-man
Bronze medal – third place	1939 Cortina d'Ampezzo	Four-man

Dr. Werner Windhaus was a German bobsledder who competed in the late 1930s. He won two medals in the four-man event at the FIBT World Championships with a silver in 1938 and a bronze in 1939.

Windhaus' career was interrupted by WWII. In 1949, he and his teammates reunited for the world championships at Lake Placid, New York, U.S. This was the first official participation of a German sports team in an international championship since the war ended.

== Sources ==
- Bobsleigh four-man world championship medalists since 1930
