= Tricia Stumpf =

American skeleton racer (born 1970)

Medal record

Skeleton

World Championships
Bronze medal – third place	2000 Igls	Women
Bronze medal – third place	2001 Calgary	Women

Tricia Stumpf (born 1970) is an American skeleton racer who competed in the early 2000s. She won two bronze medals in the women's skeleton event at the FIBT World Championships, earning them in 2000 and 2001.

== Career ==
Tricia was the Women's National Skeleton Champion in 2000 and 2001 on the Olympic track in Park City, Utah. In 2000, she also won gold in the North American Championships in Calgary, Canada. On the world stage Tricia earned two additional World Cup medals during the 2000–2001 season. She earned a bronze medal in Igls, Austria and a silver medal in La Plagne, France.

In the off-season, Tricia won three consecutive summer Push Championships in 1999, 2000 (Lake Placid, New York) and 2001 (Calgary, Canada).

An injury prevented Tricia from competing in the 2002 Olympic Winter Games in Park City, Utah. However, Tricia was selected to carry the Olympic flame in her home town of Park City, Utah, during the Olympic torch relay.

The University of Utah alumni worked as a marketing director in Park City, Utah, prior to the 2002 games. Tricia is married to two-time Olympic biathlete Joan Guetschow.
