= Rolf Thielecke =

German bobsledder

Medal record

Men's Bobsleigh

Representing Germany

World Championships
Gold medal – first place	1938 St. Moritz	Two-man
Silver medal – second place	1937 St. Moritz	Four-man
Silver medal – second place	1939 St. Moritz	Two-man
Bronze medal – third place	1938 Garmisch-Partenkirchen	Four-man

Rolf Thielecke was a German bobsledder who competed in the late 1930s. He won four medals at the FIBT World Championships with one gold (Two-man: 1938), two silvers (Two-man: 1939, Four-man: 1937), and one bronze (Four-man: 1938).
