= Hans Eichinger =

Austrian bobsledder

Medal record

Bobsleigh

World Championships
Silver medal – second place	1973 Lake Placid	Four-man
Bronze medal – third place	1974 St. Moritz	Four-man

Hans Eichinger is an Austrian bobsledder who competed in the early 1970s. He won two medals in the four-man event at the FIBT World Championships with a silver in 1973 and a bronze in 1974.
