= Antonio Gillarduzzi =

Italian bobsledder

Medal record

Bobsleigh

World Championships
Silver medal – second place	1937 Cortina d'Ampezzo	Two-man

Antonio Gillarduzzi is an Italian bobsledder who competed in the 1930s. He won a silver medal in the two-man event at the 1937 FIBT World Championships in Cortina d'Ampezzo.
