= Tomas Platzer =

German bobsledder and skeleton racer (born 1969)

Medal record

Men's Bobsleigh

Representing Germany

World Championships
Silver medal – second place	2000 Altenberg	Four-man

Tomas Platzer (born 1969) (sometimes shown as Thomas Platzer) is a German bobsledder and skeleton racer who competed in the late 1990s and early 2000s. He won a silver medal in the four-man event at the 2000 FIBT World Championships in Altenberg.

As of 2007, Platzer is a coach with the Russian bobsleigh and skeleton federation, a position he will stay at until 2008.
