= René Stadler =

Swiss bobsledder (born 1940)

Medal record

Bobsleigh

World Championships
| Gold medal – first place | 1971 Cervinia | Four-man |
| Gold medal – first place | 1973 Lake Placid | Four-man |
| Bronze medal – third place | 1970 St. Moritz | Four-man |

René Stadler (born 19 May 1940) is a Swiss bobsledder who competed in the early 1970s. He won three medals in the four-man event at the FIBT World Championships with two golds (1971, 1973) and one bronze (1970). He also competed at the 1968 Winter Olympics.
