= Katharina Sutter =

Swiss bobsledder (born 1968)

Medal record

Bobsleigh

World Championships
Gold medal – first place	2001 Calgary	Two-woman
Bronze medal – third place	2000 Winterberg	Two-woman
Bronze medal – third place	2007 St. Moritz	Mixed team

Katharina Sutter (born 27 July 1968) is a Swiss bobsledder who has competed since the late 1990s. She won three medals at the FIBT World Championships with one gold (Two-woman: 2001) and two bronzes (Two-woman: 2000, Mixed team: 2007).

Sutter also finished fourth (with Françoise Burdet) in the two-woman event at the 2002 Winter Olympics in Salt Lake City.
