= Gary Sheffield (bobsleigh) =

American bobsledder (1936–2004)

Medal record

Bobsleigh

World Championships
Gold medal – first place	1959 St. Moritz	Four-man
Silver medal – second place	1951 Alpe d'Huez	Four-man
Silver medal – second place	1961 Lake Placid	Two-man
Silver medal – second place	1961 Lake Placid	Four-man

Gary J. Sheffield (August 18, 1936 – November 20, 2004) was an American bobsledder who competed from the early 1950s to the early 1960s. He won four medals at the FIBT World Championships with one gold (Four-man: 1959) and three silvers (Two-man: 1961, Four-man: 1951, 1961). In 2004, he died at the age of 68.
