= Franz Isenegger =

Swiss bobsledder

Medal record

Bobsleigh

World Championships
Silver medal – second place	1981 Cortina d'Ampezzo	Four-man
Bronze medal – third place	1982 St. Moritz	Four-man

Franz Isenegger is a Swiss bobsledder who competed in the early 1980s. He won two medals in the four-man event at the FIBT World Championships with a silver in 1981 and a bronze in 1982.
