= Jennifer Davidson (bobsledder) =

American bobsledder

Medal record

Bobsleigh

World Championships
Silver medal – second place	2000 Winterberg	Two-woman
Silver medal – second place	2001 Calgary	Two-woman

Jennifer Davidson is an American bobsledder who competed from the late 1990s to the early 2000s. She won two silver medals in the two-woman event at the FIBT World Championships, earning them in 2000 and 2001.

Davidson is best known for her controversy with her bobsleigh partner Jean Racine (now Prahm) prior to the bobsleigh trials for the 2002 Winter Olympics in Salt Lake City where the pair split when Racine dumped Davidson on December 13, 2001. Davidson filed an arbitration against the US Bobsleigh and Skeleton Federation, but eventually withdrew it. She served as a forerunner in the 2002 Olympic bobsled events.
