= Domenic Keller =

Swiss bobsledder

Medal record

Bobsleigh

World Championships
Bronze medal – third place	2000 Altenberg	Four-man
Bronze medal – third place	2001 St. Moritz	Four-man

Domenic Keller is a Swiss bobsledder who competed in the early 2000s. He won two bronze medals in the four-man event at the FIBT World Championships earning them in 2000 and 2001.
