= Fritz Feierabend =

Swiss bobsledder (1908–1978)

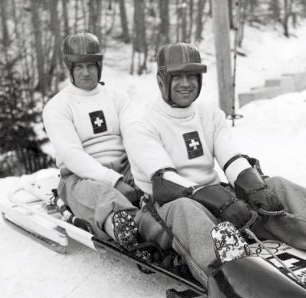
- Joseph Beerli and Fritz Feierabend (right) at the 1936 Olympics

Personal information
- Born: 29 June 1908 Engelberg, Switzerland
- Died: 25 November 1978 (aged 70) Stans, Switzerland
Medal record
Bobsleigh
Representing Switzerland
Olympic Games
Silver medal – second place	1936 Garmisch-Partenkirchen	Two-man
Silver medal – second place	1936 Garmisch-Partenkirchen	Four-man
Silver medal – second place	1948 St. Moritz	Two-man
Bronze medal – third place	1952 Oslo	Two-man
Bronze medal – third place	1952 Oslo	Four-man
World Championships
Bronze medal – third place	1935 St. Moritz	Four-man
Bronze medal – third place	1938 St. Moritz	Two-man
Gold medal – first place	1939 Cortina d'Ampezzo	Four-man
Gold medal – first place	1947 St. Moritz	Two-man
Gold medal – first place	1947 St. Moritz	Four-man
Silver medal – second place	1949 Lake Placid	Two-man
Bronze medal – third place	1949 Lake Placid	Four-man
Gold medal – first place	1950 Cortina d'Ampezzo	Two-man
Silver medal – second place	1950 Cortina d'Ampezzo	Four-man
Gold medal – first place	1954 Cortina d'Ampezzo	Four-man
Gold medal – first place	1955 St. Moritz	Two-man
Silver medal – second place	1955 St. Moritz	Four-man

Fritz Feierabend (29 June 1908 – 25 November 1978) was a Swiss bobsledder who competed at 1936, 1948 and 1952 Winter Olympics. He won three silver and two bronze medals in two-man and four-man events.

Feierabend also won twelve medals at the FIBT World Championships with six golds (two-man: 1947, 1950, 1955; four-man: 1939, 1947, 1954), three silvers (two-man: 1949; four-man: 1950, 1955), and three bronzes (two-man: 1938, four-man: 1935, 1949).

Feierabend retired after the 1955 World Championships. Together with his father he constructed bobsleighs, including the first all-steel bobsleigh.
