= Christian Reich =

Swiss bobsledder (born 1967)

Medal record

Men's Bobsleigh

Representing Switzerland

Olympic Games
Silver medal – second place	2002 Salt Lake City	Two-man

World Championships
Silver medal – second place	1989 Cortina d'Ampezzo	Four-man
Bronze medal – third place	2000 Altenberg	Two-man
Bronze medal – third place	2000 Altenberg	Four-man
Bronze medal – third place	2001 St. Moritz	Four-man

World Cup Championships
Gold medal – first place	1999-00	Two-man
Silver medal – second place	1999-00	Combined
Silver medal – second place	2001-02	Combined
Bronze medal – third place	2001-02	Two-man
Bronze medal – third place	2001-02	Four-man

Christian Reich (born 23 September 1967 in Aarau) is a Swiss bobsledder who competed from the late 1990s to the early 2000s. Competing in four Winter Olympics, he won a silver medal in the two-man event with teammate Steve Anderhub at Salt Lake City in 2002.

Reich also won four medals at the FIBT World Championships with one silver (Four-man: 1989) and three bronzes (Two-man: 2000, Four-man: 2000, 2001).

He won the two-man Bobsleigh World Cup championship in 1999-2000
