= FIBT World Championships 1939 =

Bobsleigh championships in St. Moritz, Switzerland and Cortina d'Ampezzo, Italy

1939 World Championships
- Location: St. Moritz, Switzerland; Cortina d'Ampezzo, Italy

The FIBT World Championships 1939 took place in St. Moritz, Switzerland (Two-man) and Cortina d'Ampezzo, Italy (Four-man). St. Moritz hosted the two-man event for the second time after hosting it previously in 1938, along with hosting the four-man event in 1931, 1935, and 1937. Cortina d'Ampezzo hosted the two-man event previously in 1937. It was the last world championships that would be held prior to World War II and the last that would be held with bobsleigh events in separate locations until 2000 when the two-woman event debuted that year.

== Two man bobsleigh ==
Pos	Team	Time
Gold	Belgium (René Lunden, Jeans Coops)	
Silver	Germany (Bibo Fischer, Rolf Thielecke)	
Bronze	Germany (Hanns Killian, Schletter)	

== Four man bobsleigh ==
Pos	Team	Time
Gold	Switzerland (Fritz Feierabend, Heinz Cattani, Alphonse Hörning, Joseph Beerli)	
Silver	United Kingdom (Frederick McEvoy, Peter Howard, John Galt Critchley, Charles Green)	
Bronze	Germany (Hanns Killian, Werner Windhaus, Bobby Braumiller, Franz Kemser)	

== Medal table ==
Rank	Nation	Gold	Silver	Bronze	Total
1	Belgium (BEL)	1	0	0	1
1	Switzerland (SUI)	1	0	0	1
3	Germany (GER)	0	2	1	3
4	Great Britain (GBR)	0	1	0	1
Totals (4 entries)		2	3	1	6
