= FIBT World Championships 1958 =

Winter sport competition

1958 World Championships
- Location: Garmisch-Partenkirchen, West Germany

The FIBT World Championships 1958 took place in Garmisch-Partenkirchen, West Germany for the fourth time. The West German city had hosted the event previously in 1934 (Four-man), 1938 (Four-man), and in 1953.

== Two man bobsleigh ==
Pos	Team	Time
Gold	Italy (Eugenio Monti, Renzo Alverà)	
Silver	Italy (Sergio Zardini, Sergio Siorpaes)	
Bronze	Austria (Paul Aste, Pepi Isser)	

== Four man bobsleigh ==
Pos	Team	Time
Gold	West Germany (Hans Rösch, Alfred Hammer, Theodore Bauer, Walter Haller)	
Silver	West Germany (Franz Schelle, Eduard Kaltenberger, Josef Sterff, Otto Göbl)	
Bronze	Italy (Sergio Zardini, Massimo Bogana, Renato Mocellini, Alberto Righini)	

== Medal table ==
Rank	Nation	Gold	Silver	Bronze	Total
1	Italy (ITA)	1	1	1	3
2	West Germany (FRG)	1	1	0	2
3	Austria (AUT)	0	0	1	1
Totals (3 entries)		2	2	2	6
