= Lars Behrendt =

German bobsledder

Medal record

Men's Bobsleigh

Representing Germany

World Championships
Gold medal – first place	2000 Altenberg	Four-man
Silver medal – second place	2001 St. Moritz	Four-man

Lars Behrendt (born 28 September 1973) is a German bobsledder who competed from 1998 to 2002. He won two medals in the four-man event at the FIBT World Championships with a gold in 2000 and a silver in 2001.
