= Heinz Cattani =

Swiss bobsledder (1908–2001)

Medal record

Bobsleigh

World Championships
Gold medal – first place	1939 Cortina d'Ampezzo	Four-man

Heinz Cattani (1908–2001) was a Swiss bobsledder who competed from the late 1930s to the late 1940s. He won a gold medal in the four-man event at the FIBT World Championships, earning it in 1939.
