= Josef Sterff =

German bobsledder

Medal record

Men's Bobsleigh

Representing West Germany

World Championships
Gold medal – first place	1962 Garmisch-Partenkirchen	Four-man
Silver medal – second place	1958 Garmisch-Partenkirchen	Four-man
Bronze medal – third place	1959 St. Moritz	Four-man

Josef Sterff (2 January 1935 – 7 September 2015) was a West German bobsledder who competed from the late 1950s to the early 1960s. He won a complete set of medals in the four-man event at the FIBT World Championships (gold: 1962, silver: 1958, bronze: 1959). Sterff also finished fifth in the four-man event at the 1964 Winter Olympics in Innsbruck.
