= Henry Gerlach =

East German bobsledder

Medal record

Men's Bobsleigh

Representing East Germany

World Championships
Gold medal – first place	1981 Cortina d'Ampezzo	Four-man
Bronze medal – third place	1983 Lake Placid	Four-man

Henry Gerlach is an East German bobsledder who competed in the early 1980s. He won two medals in the four-man event at the FIBT World Championships with a gold in 1981 and a bronze in 1983.
