= Hanns Kilian =

German bobsledder (1905–1981)

Personal information
- Nationality: German
- Born: 2 May 1905 Garmisch, German Empire
- Died: 17 April 1981 (aged 75) Garmisch-Partenkirchen, West Germany

Sport
- Sport: Bobsleigh
Medal record
Men's Bobsleigh
Representing Germany
Representing Germany
Olympic Games
Bronze medal – third place	1928 St. Moritz	Five-man
Bronze medal – third place	1932 Lake Placid	Four-man
World Championships
Gold medal – first place	1931 Oberhof	Two-man
Gold medal – first place	1934 Garmisch-Partenkirchen	Four-man
Gold medal – first place	1935 St. Moritz	Four-man
Silver medal – second place	1938 Garmisch-Partenkirchen	Four-man
Bronze medal – third place	1939 St. Moritz	Two-man
Bronze medal – third place	1939 Cortina d'Ampezzo	Four-man

Hans Kilian (alternate listings: Hanns Kilian, Hans Killian, or Hanns Killian (2 May 1905 – 17 April 1981) was a German bobsledder who competed from the late 1920s to the late 1930s. Competing in three Winter Olympics, he won two bronze medals (1928: Five-man, 1932: Four-man).

Kilian also won seven medals at the FIBT World Championships, including three golds (Two-man: 1931, Four-man: 1934, 1935), one silver (Four-man: 1938), and two bronzes (Two-man and four-man: both 1939).

He was born and died in Garmisch-Partenkirchen.
