= Dix Terne =

German bobsledder

Medal record

Men's Bobsleigh

Representing West Germany

World Championships
| Silver medal – second place | 1954 Cortina d'Ampezzo | Four-man |
| Bronze medal – third place | 1953 Garmisch-Partenkirchen | Four-man |

Dix Terne was a West German bobsledder who competed in the early 1950s. He won two medals in the four-man event at the FIBT World Championships with one silver in 1954 and one bronze in 1953 (tied with Sweden).
