= Sven Peter =

German bobsledder

Personal information
- Nationality: German
- Born: Sven Peter

Sport
- Sport: Bobsleigh
- Events: Two-man, Four-man
Medal record
Representing Germany
World Championships
Gold medal – first place	2001 St. Moritz	Four-man
Bronze medal – third place	1996 Calgary	Four-man
European Championships
Silver medal – second place	2001 Königssee	Four-man

Sven Peter is a German bobsledder who competed in the late 1990s and early 2000s. He won three medals in the four-man event at the FIBT World Championships and European championships, with a gold and silver in 2001 and a bronze in 1996.
