= Christoph Langen =

German bobsledder (born 1962)

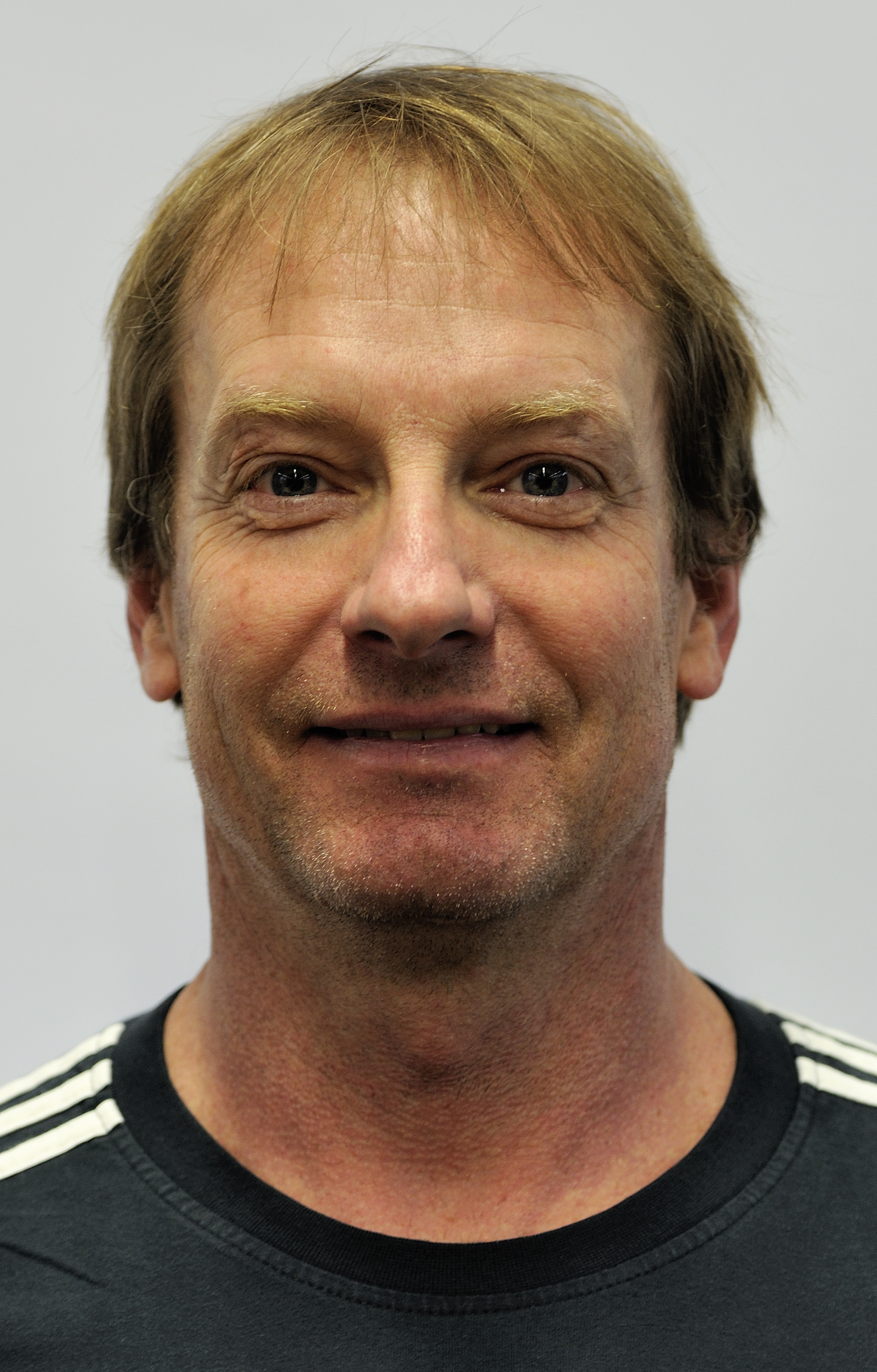
Medal record
Men's Bobsleigh
Representing Germany
Olympic Games
Gold medal – first place	1998 Nagano	Four-man
Gold medal – first place	2002 Salt Lake City	Two-man
Bronze medal – third place	1992 Albertville	Two-man
Bronze medal – third place	1998 Nagano	Two-man
World Championships
Gold medal – first place	1991 Altenberg	Four-man
Gold medal – first place	1993 Igls	Two-man
Gold medal – first place	1995 Winterberg	Two-man
Gold medal – first place	1996 Calgary	Two-man
Gold medal – first place	1996 Calgary	Four-man
Gold medal – first place	2000 Altenberg	Two-man
Gold medal – first place	2001 St. Moritz	Two-man
Gold medal – first place	2001 St. Moritz	Four-man
Silver medal – second place	1999 Cortina d'Ampezzo	Two-man
Silver medal – second place	2000 Altenberg	Four-man
Silver medal – second place	2004 Königssee	Two-man
Silver medal – second place	2004 Königssee	Four-man
World Cup Championships
Gold medal – first place	1995-96	Combined
Gold medal – first place	1995-96	Two-man
Gold medal – first place	1998-99	Combined
Gold medal – first place	1998-99	Four-man
Gold medal – first place	1998-99	Two-man
Gold medal – first place	2003-04	Two-man
Silver medal – second place	1993-94	Two-man
Silver medal – second place	1995-96	Four-man
European Championships
Gold medal – first place	1994	Two-man
Gold medal – first place	1995	Two-man
Gold medal – first place	1996	Four-man
Gold medal – first place	1996	Two-man
Gold medal – first place	1999	Four-man
Gold medal – first place	2001	Two-man
Gold medal – first place	2004	Two-man

Christoph Langen (born 27 March 1962, in Cologne, North Rhine-Westphalia) is a German bobsledder who competed for the West Germany and Germany national team from 1985 to 2005 (as a pilot from 1991). In his four Winter Olympics, he won four medals; two golds (Two-man: 2002, Four-man: 1998) and two bronzes (Two-man: 1992, 1998).

Langen was slowed by injuries to his Achilles tendon, which required two surgeries. His injuries prevented competing in the 2006 Winter Olympics in Turin. He was a bobsleigh television commentator in Germany until promoted to head coach of the Germany national team in June 2010.

Langen also won twelve medals at the FIBT World Championships with eight golds (Two-man: 1993, 1995, 1996, 2000, 2001; Four-man: 1991 (as a brakeman), 1996, 2001) and four silvers (Two-man: 1999, 2004; Four-man: 2000, 2004).

Langen also won the Bobsleigh World Cup combined event twice (1995–96, 1998–99), the two-man event three times (1995–96, 1998–99, 2003–04), and the four-man event once (1998–99).

== Additional championships ==
- European champion 2-man crew: 1994, 1995, 1996, 2001, 2004
- European champion 4-man crew: 1996, 1999
