= FIBT World Championships 2000 =

Bobsleigh and skeleton competition

2000 World Championships
- Location: Altenberg, Germany; Winterberg, Germany; Igls, Austria

The FIBT World Championships 2000 took place in Altenberg, Germany (men's bobsleigh), Winterberg, Germany (women's bobsleigh), and Igls, Austria (men's and women's skeleton). Altenberg hosted the championship event for the fourth time, doing so previously in 1991 (bobsleigh), 1994 (skeleton), and 1999 (skeleton). Winterberg hosted the championship event for the second time, doing so previously in 1995 (bobsleigh). Igls hosted the championship for the fifth time, doing do previously in 1935 (two-man) and 1963, 1991 (skeleton), and 1993 (bobsleigh). Two-woman bobsleigh and women's skeleton debuted at these championships.

== Bobsleigh ==
=== Two man ===
Pos	Team	Time
Gold	Germany (Christoph Langen, Markus Zimmermann)	
Silver	Germany (André Lange, René Hoppe)	
Bronze	Switzerland (Christian Reich, Urs Aeberhand)	

=== Four man ===
Pos	Team	Time
Gold	Germany (André Lange, René Hoppe, Lars Behrendt, Carsten Embach)	
Silver	Germany (Christoph Langen, Markus Zimmermann, Tomas Platzer, Sven Rühr)	
Bronze	Switzerland (Christian Reich, Bruno Aeberhard, Urs Aeberhand, Domenic Keller)	

=== Two woman ===
Pos	Team	Time
Gold	Germany (Gabriele Kohlisch, Kathleen Hering)	
Silver	United States (Jean Racine, Jennifer Davidson)	
Bronze	Switzerland (Françoise Burdet, Katharina Sutter)	

Kohlisch competed for the Germans in luge, winning ten World Championship and three European championship medals between 1987 and 1997.

== Skeleton ==
=== Men ===
Pos	Athlete	Time
Gold	Andy Böhme (GER)	
Silver	Gregor Stähli (SUI)	
Bronze	Jim Shea (USA)	
Bronze	Alexander Müller (AUT)	

=== Women ===
Pos	Athlete	Time
Gold	Steffi Hanzlik (GER)	
Silver	Mellisa Hollingsworth (CAN)	
Bronze	Tricia Stumpf (USA)	

== Medal table ==
Rank	Nation	Gold	Silver	Bronze	Total
1	Germany (GER)	5	2	0	7
2	Switzerland (SUI)	0	1	3	4
3	United States (USA)	0	1	2	3
4	Canada (CAN)	0	1	0	1
5	Austria (AUT)	0	0	1	1
Totals (5 entries)		5	5	6	16
