= Charles Patrick Green =

British bobsledder and World War II flying ace

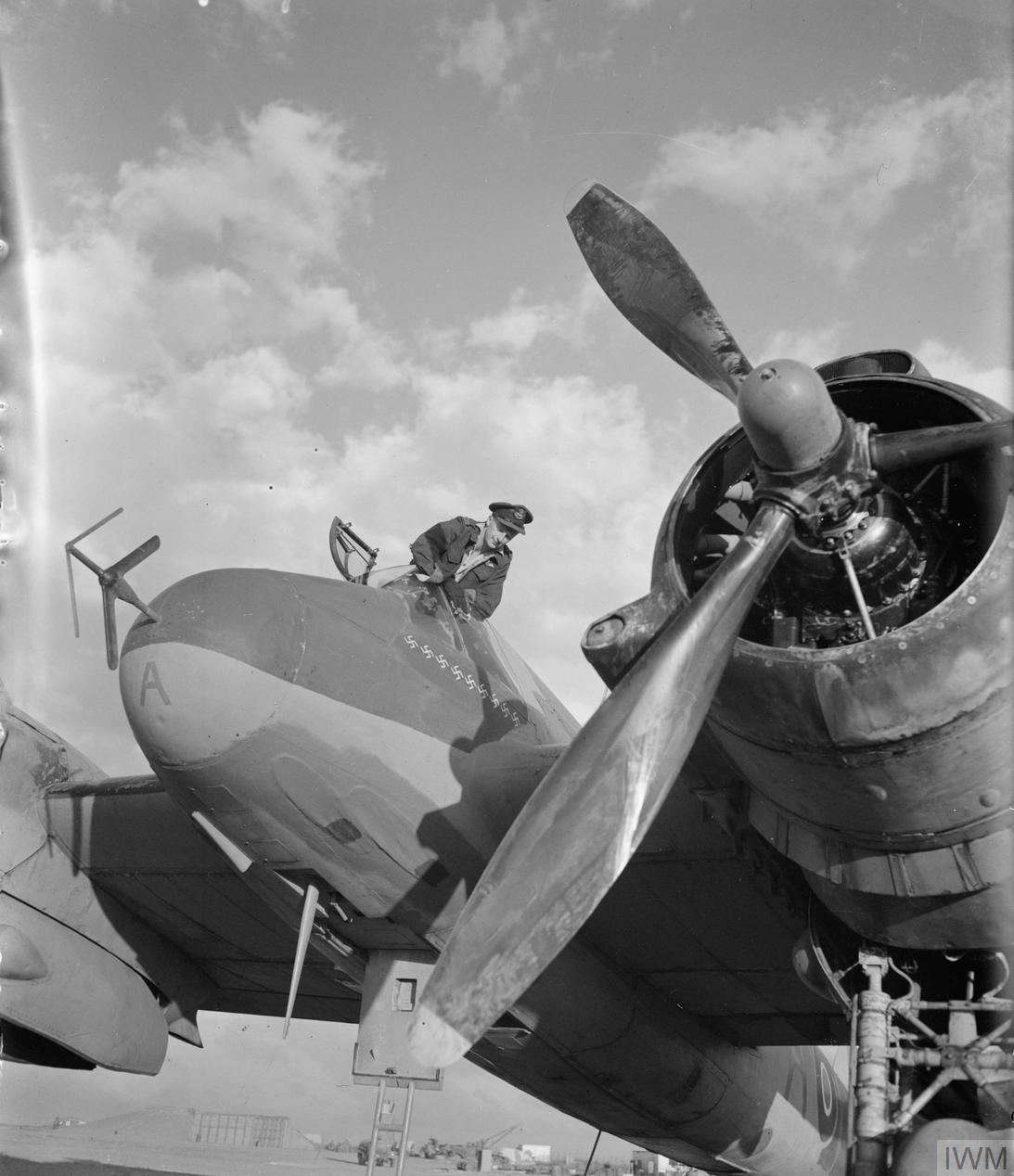
- Paddy Green in his Beaufighter
- Born: 30 March 1914; Pietermaritzburg, South Africa
- Died: 10 April 1999 (aged 85); Collingwood, Ontario, Canada
- Military career
- Allegiance: United Kingdom
- Branch: Royal Air Force
- Service years: 1937–47
- Rank: Group captain
- Nickname: Paddy
- Units: No. 601 Squadron RAF; No. 91 Squadron RAF; No. 600 Squadron RAF
- Commands: No. 600 Squadron RAF
- Conflicts: Second World War: Battle of Britain; Tunisian campaign; Allied invasion of Italy
- Awards: Distinguished Service Order; Distinguished Flying Cross; Order of the Patriotic War

Charles Patrick Green
Medal record

Bobsleigh

Olympic Games
Bronze medal – third place	1936 Garmisch-Partenkirchen	Four-man

World Championships
Gold medal – first place	1937 St. Moritz	Four-man
Gold medal – first place	1938 Garmisch-Partenkirchen	Four-man
Silver medal – second place	1938 St. Moritz	Two-man
Silver medal – second place	1939 Cortina d'Ampezzo	Four-man

Charles Patrick Green (30 March 1914 – 10 March 1999) was a South African-born British Royal Air Force (RAF) fighter pilot during World War II who was credited with eleven confirmed kills and another three probable. Most of these were during night missions, including seven over a period of three nights in June 1943, actions for which he received numerous awards. Green was also a member of the British bobsleigh team in the mid-1930s, winning several medals including World Cup gold and Olympic bronze.

== Early life ==
Green was born in Pietermaritzburg, South Africa on 30 March 1914, the son of Major Charles Henry Green and Ruth Graham Parry. His father was killed in action in British East Africa in November 1917. His mother re-married, which led to Green travelling Europe before being sent to Harrow School from 1927 to 1932. A natural athlete, he set the Harrow record for hurdles that lasted 40 years. After Harrow he moved to Trinity College, Cambridge, graduating in 1935.

He became a Fellow of the Royal Geographical Society (FRGS) in 1935. After graduation, he decided to travel for a year in the United States. While in California he went to see the film China Clipper with his friend Billy Fiske. They decided to take up flying and both began training on a Fleet Model 1 the next day.

After returning to England, he became a member of the British bobsleigh team led by Frederick McEvoy, which won bronze in the 1936 Winter Olympics, and won two golds in the world cup four-man events in 1937 and 1938, and a silver in the two-man event in 1938, and another silver for the four-man team in 1939.

== War era ==
=== Day fighters ===
Green joined the Royal Auxiliary Air Force after returning to England in 1936. He was posted to 601 Squadron Auxiliary Air Force on 28 February 1937, the "millionaires squadron". He took his first flight with the squadron that day in a Hawker Hart and continued training on the Hart, its two-seat variant the Hawker Demon and the Avro Tutor. He was awarded his flying badge on 19 September 1937.

He was briefly transferred to No. 79 Squadron RAF which operated as the Operational Conversion Unit for Gloster Gauntlet fighters, and returned to 601 which had switched to this type in November 1938. In March 1939 he underwent further conversion training on the Airspeed Oxford in preparation for 601 to switch to the Bristol Blenheim light bomber. In April he was awarded command of his own Blenheim, L6618 (UF-M).

Green was promoted to Flight Lieutenant in command of A flight of the newly forming No. 92 Squadron RAF at RAF Tangmere. Over the next months, he flew a wide variety of aircraft, including the Hind and Fairey Battles before returning to the Blenheim. In February 1940 he began flying Harvard and Miles Master as conversion training as No. 92 prepared to switch to the Supermarine Spitfire.

He flew solo in the Spitfire on 8 March 1940 and began flying patrols from RAF Hornchurch on 23 May. That day he got a "probable" on a Messerschmitt Bf 109 and damaged another. Flying another patrol later that day, an armor-piercing bullet hit him in the leg. Using his fingers to staunch the bleeding, he turned up his oxygen to full to avoid passing out and landed at RAF Hawkinge. He spent several of the following months in various hospitals.

On his recuperation, on 10 October 1940 he flew to RAF Biggin Hill to take command of No. 421 (Reconnaissance) Flight RAF at RAF Gravesend flying Spitfires and Hawker Hurricanes. On the 12th he was once again wounded in Spitfire Mk.IIa P7441 by JG 52 pilot and bailed out of his aircraft after a long struggle trying to get out of the cockpit. He was not seriously injured and returned to flying on 1 November. On 25 November he shot down a Dornier Do 17 piloting Spitfire LZ-V, whose destruction was confirmed by the Royal Navy as it was seen crashing in mid Channel, but unsubstantiated. He had another probable against a 109 on 5 December (16 claimed but only 3 destroyed), and piloting Spitfire LZ-K shared a kill against what was claimed to be a Dornier Do 215 on 27 December. (Note: Although the Do 215 was used in small numbers during this period, it is equally likely this is a misidentified Do 17 which is very similar.) Also this claim is unsubstantiated. No loss by Luftwaffe, only one Do 17 slightly damaged, either by 421 Flight or by 234 Squadron F/O Edward Brian "Mortie" Mortimer-Rose piloting X4243.

On 11 January 1941, No. 421 was redesignated No. 91 Squadron RAF and Green was promoted Squadron Leader Commanding. He was awarded the Distinguished Flying Cross on 3 April 1941.

=== Various posts ===
On 16 June he was posted to Headquarters Fighter Command as a Staff Officer and spent the next few months in a variety of roles, including a short stint as a German Heinkel He 111 pilot in the film The First of the Few.

On 29 August 1941, Green flew his first flight in the Bristol Beaufighter and went solo on 13 September. On 13 October he was sent to No.54 Operational Training Unit for night fighter training, flying Airspeed Oxfords and Blenheims. He was posted to reserve squadron No. 600 Squadron RAF on 14 November to command A flight, which flew the Beaufighter II, a version powered by the Rolls-Royce Merlin engines instead of their normal Bristol Hercules, a combination he said was "the most dangerous aircraft to fly that was ever made".

In December 1941 he punctured his ear drum which led to another short grounding. In early 1942 he was sent to the No. 1 Blind Approach School and then returned to No. 600 on 11 February. On 2 June he was made Wing Commander of No. 125 Squadron RAF at RAF Fairwood Common.

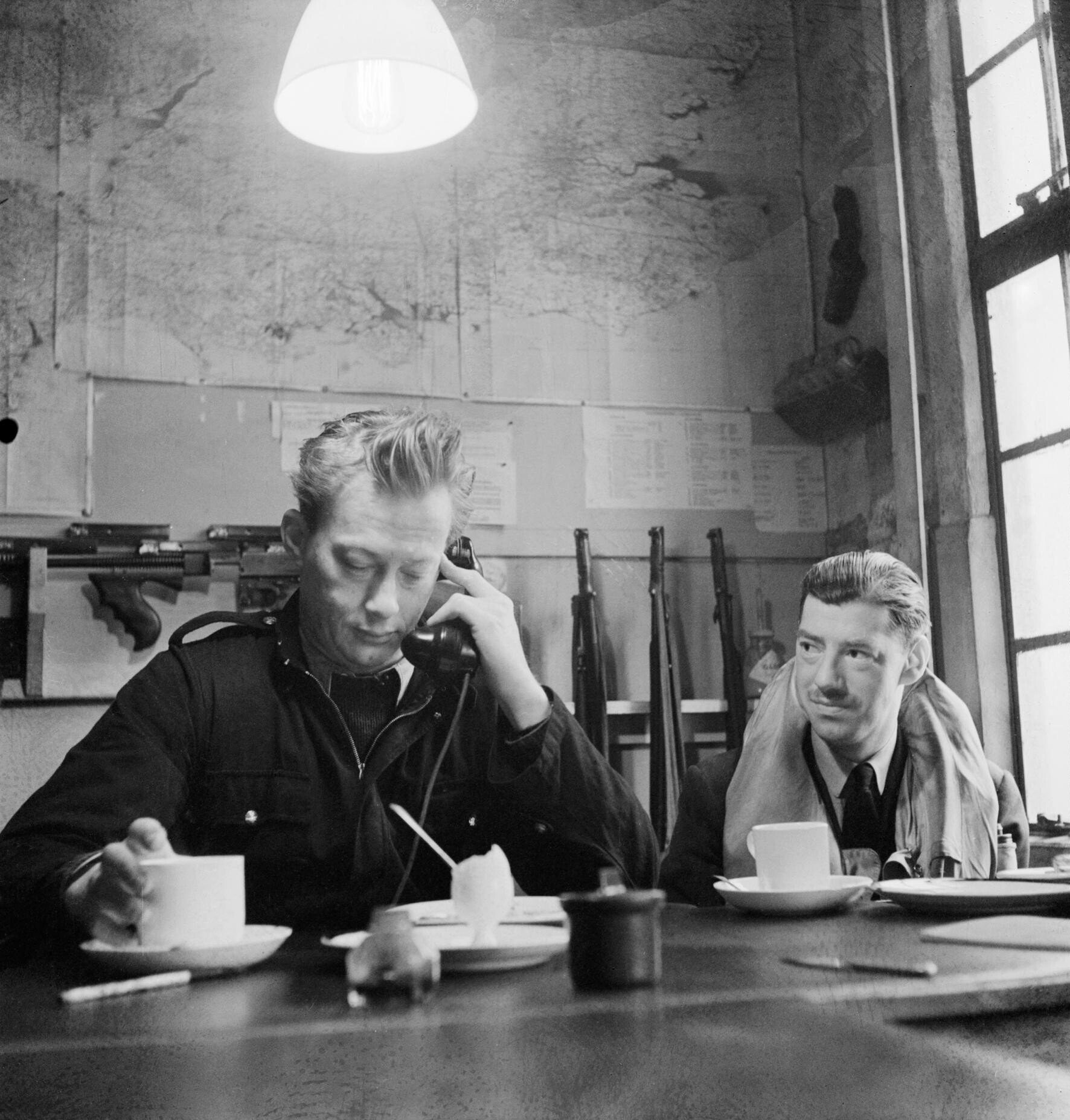
Squadron Leader Charles Green (on the right), commanding 'A' Flight of No. 600 Squadron at Predannack in Cornwall, checks the serviceability of his Beaufighters after a night of patrolling over the West Country, April 1942

=== Night fighters ===
On 10 December 1942, Green was once again posted to command No. 600, which by this time had moved to Maison Blanche Airport in Algeria, today's Houari Boumediene Airport. He ferried to the airport on 24 December by Douglas Dakota and Boeing B-17. On arrival, he rejoined his former radar operator, Reginald Joseph Gillies. The unit fought the Luftwaffe during the closing stages of the battle against the Afrika Korps in Tunis. During this time the squadron won a number of battle awards, leading to the nicknames "The Black Knights", "The Fright in the Night", and "The Gong Squadron".

On 5 May 1943, Green and Gillies shot down a Junkers Ju 88 during a dawn patrol. The next day he was hit by fire from a destroyer near Bouficha, which led to the aircraft being too heavily damaged to immediately return to flight. The squadron then moved to RAF Luqa on Malta. While covering the action during the invasion of Sicily, over a period of three nights in July, Green and Gillies were credited with seven confirmed kills, including four on one sortie. This led to them both being awarded the Distinguished Flying Cross on 20 August 1943.

On 10 July, as part of the Allied invasion of Sicily, he was awarded a kill on a Ju 88, and on the 12th, a He 111. By the end of the month, his score was nine destroyed, two probables and four damaged, and on 29 July he was awarded the Distinguished Service Order. On 11 August he downed another Ju 88, and a probable on an He 111 on 9 September. After the successful Allied invasion of Italy, the unit moved to Salerno on 23 September. During this time the 600 gained such a fearsome reputation that their presence would be announced in the Allied press to ward off Luftwaffe operations.

He had his last kill, on a Ju 88, on 25 January 1944, by which point Luftwaffe operations were beginning to wind down as the full effect of the Soviet advances and massive increase in RAF and USAAF bombing began. On 11 April 1944 he received the Soviet Order of the Patriotic War 1st Class, and on 8 July 1944 he was awarded the US Distinguished Flying Cross.

=== Later roles ===
In the summer of 1944, Green was promoted to Group Captain of the 1 Mobile Operations group of the Desert Air Force, and then to command a wing of Douglas Boston bombers. On 5 November, he was posted to command No. 232 Wing, a composite unit flying Spitfires, Fairchilds, Bostons, Dakotas, Mosquitoes, Sea Otters, Proctors, Ansons, Oxfords and a Vickers Warwick. At the end of the war, his record stood at eleven confirmed kills and three probables and four damaged.

He remained in the RAF post-war, with his last flight in an active squadron on 12 August 1946. He was then posted to the Central Fighter Establishment to help develop jet fighter tactics for the Gloster Meteor.

== Later life ==
Green left the Air Force in 1947 and returned to South Africa with his new wife Ruth, a Canadian nurse he met in Italy in 1946. He worked for the South African division of Anglo American plc before retiring in 1977. Green and his wife then retired to a farm in Collingwood, Ontario, Canada, near her childhood home in Owen Sound. Ruth died in 1981 and Paddy on 10 April 1999, aged 85. They had a son and two daughters.
