= Heinz Schenker =

Swiss bobsledder (born 1943)

Medal record

Bobsleigh

World Championships
Silver medal – second place	1973 Lake Placid	Two-man

Heinz Schenker (born 26 July 1943) is a Swiss bobsledder who competed in the early 1970s. He won a silver medal in the two-man event at the 1973 FIBT World Championships in Lake Placid, New York.

Schenker also competed at the 1972 Winter Olympics in Sapporo, finishing fourth in the four-man event and seventh in the two-man event.
