= Bobby Braumiller =

German bobsledder

Medal record

Men's Bobsleigh

Representing Germany

World Championships
| Silver medal – second place | 1938 Garmisch-Partenkirchen | Four-man |

Bobby Braumiller was a German bobsledder who competed in the late 1930s. He won a silver medal in the four-man event at the 1938 FIBT World Championships at Garmisch-Partenkirchen.
