= Peter Utzschneider =

German bobsledder

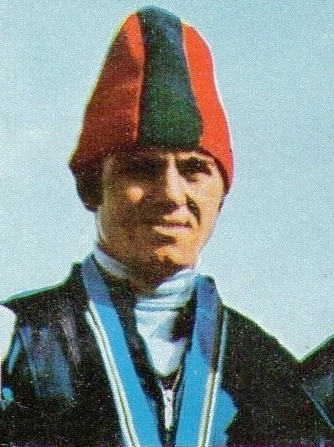
- Utzschneider at the 1972 Olympics

Personal information
- Born: 6 March 1946 (age 80) Murnau am Staffelsee, Germany
- Height: 182 cm (6 ft 0 in)
- Weight: 87 kg (192 lb)

Sport
- Sport: Bobsleigh
- Club: SV Ohlstadt
Medal record
Men's bobsleigh
Representing West Germany
Olympic Games
Gold medal – first place	1972 Sapporo	Two-man
Bronze medal – third place	1972 Sapporo	Four-man
Bronze medal – third place	1976 Innsbruck	Four-man
World Championships
Gold medal – first place	1969 Lake Placid	Four-man
Silver medal – second place	1970 St. Moritz	Two-man
Silver medal – second place	1970 St. Moritz	Four-man
Bronze medal – third place	1971 Cervinia	Four-man
Gold medal – first place	1973 Lake Placid	Two-man
Bronze medal – third place	1973 Lake Placid	Four-man
Gold medal – first place	1974 St. Moritz	Two-man
Gold medal – first place	1974 St. Moritz	Four-man
Silver medal – second place	1975 Cervinia	Four-man
European Championships
Bronze medal – third place	1967 Igls	Two-man
Gold medal – first place	1968 St. Moritz	Two-man
Bronze medal – third place	1970 Cortina d'Ampezzo	Two-man
Gold medal – first place	1970 Cortina d'Ampezzo	Four-man

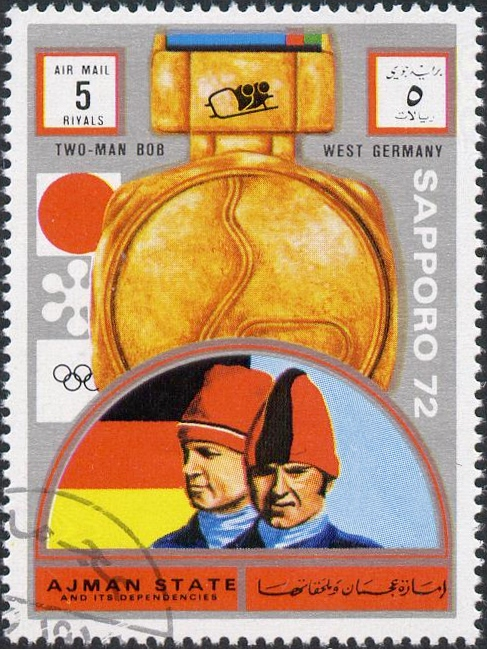
Zimmerer and Utzschneider on a stamp of Ajman

Peter Utzschneider (born 6 March 1946) is a retired West German bobsledder who mostly competed as a brakeman together with Wolfgang Zimmerer. They competed at the 1968, 1972 and 1976 Winter Olympics and won three medals, with one gold (two-man in 1972), and two bronzes (four-man in 1972 and 1976).

Utzschneider and Zimmerer won nine medals at the FIBT World Championships, with four golds (two-man: 1973, 1974; four-man: 1969, 1973), three silvers (two-man: 1970, four-man: 1970, 1975), and two bronzes (four-man: 1971, 1973). They also collected 10 medals at the European championships, including five golds: in two-man in 1968, 1972, and 1973, and in the four-man in 1970 and 1973.
