= Wolfgang Zimmerer =

West German bobsledder

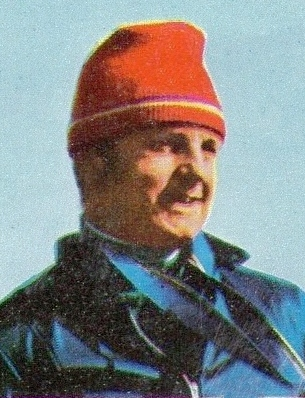
- Zimmerer in 1972

Personal information
- Born: 15 November 1940 (age 85) Ohlstadt, Germany
- Height: 178 cm (5 ft 10 in)
- Weight: 75 kg (165 lb)

Sport
- Sport: Bobsleigh
- Club: SV Ohlstadt
Medal record
Men's bobsleigh
Representing West Germany
Olympic Games
Gold medal – first place	1972 Sapporo	Two-man
Bronze medal – third place	1972 Sapporo	Four-man
Silver medal – second place	1976 Innsbruck	Two-man
Bronze medal – third place	1976 Innsbruck	Four-man
World Championships
Gold medal – first place	1969 Lake Placid	Four-man
Silver medal – second place	1970 St. Moritz	Two-man
Silver medal – second place	1970 St. Moritz	Four-man
Bronze medal – third place	1971 Cervinia	Four-man
Gold medal – first place	1973 Lake Placid	Two-man
Bronze medal – third place	1973 Lake Placid	Four-man
Gold medal – first place	1974 St. Moritz	Two-man
Gold medal – first place	1974 St. Moritz	Four-man
Silver medal – second place	1975 Cervinia	Four-man
European Championships
Bronze medal – third place	1967 Igls	Two-man
Gold medal – first place	1968 St. Moritz	Two-man
Bronze medal – third place	1970 Cortina d'Ampezzo	Two-man
Gold medal – first place	1970 Cortina d'Ampezzo	Four-man

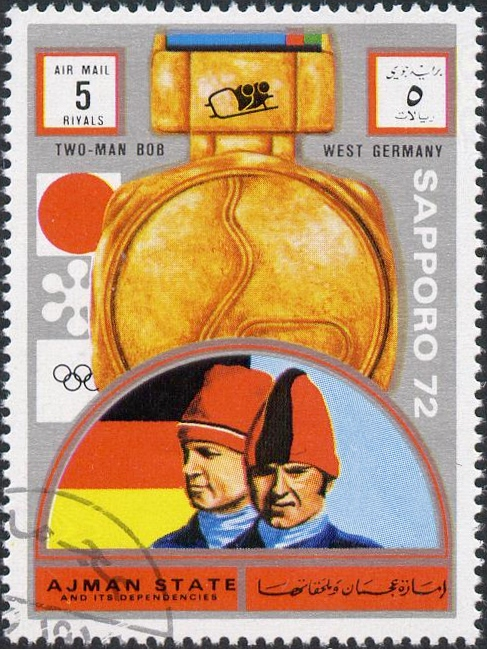
Zimmerer and Utzschneider on a stamp of Ajman

Wolfgang Zimmerer (born 15 November 1940) is a retired West-German bobsledder who mostly competed as a driver together with his brakeman Peter Utzschneider. Zimmerer took part in the 1968, 1972 and 1976 Winter Olympics and won four medals, with one gold (two-man in 1972), one silver (two-man in 1976), and two bronzes (four-man in 1972 and 1976).

Zimmerer and Utzschneider won nine medals at the FIBT World Championships with four golds (two-man: 1973, 1974; four-man: 1969, 1973), three silvers (two-man: 1970, four-man: 1970, 1975), and two bronzes (four-man: 1971, 1973). They also collected 10 medals at the European championships, including five golds: in two-man in 1968, 1972, and 1973, and in the four-man in 1970 and 1973.

Zimmerer's nieces Maria Höfl-Riesch and Susanne Riesch are Olympic alpine skiers.
