= René Lunden =

Belgian bobsledder (1902–1942)

Personal information
- Full name: René Henri Théophile Florent Marie Joseph de Lunden
- Nationality: Belgian
- Born: 2 June 1902 Brussels, Belgium
- Died: 3 April 1942 (aged 39) Chichester, England

Sport
- Sport: Bobsleigh
Medal record
Bobsleigh
World Championships
Gold medal – first place	1939 St. Moritz	Two-man

René Henri Theophile Lunden, Baron de Lunden (2 June 1902 – 3 April 1942) was a Belgian bobsledder who competed in the late 1930s. He won a gold medal in the two-man event at the 1939 FIBT World Championships in St. Moritz.

Lunden also competed at the 1936 Winter Olympics in Garmisch-Partenkirchen, finishing eighth in both the two-man and four-man events.

Lunden joined the British RAF during World War II, was commissioned as a Pilot Officer, and was killed in an air crash while returning from a mission in April 1942 aged 39. His body was repatriated to Belgium after the war.
