= David Looker =

British bobsledder

Medal record

Bobsleigh

World Championships
Gold medal – first place	1937 St. Moritz	Four-man
Gold medal – first place	1938 Garmisch-Partenkirchen	Four-man

David Looker (26 February 1913 – 13 January 1995) was a British bobsledder who competed in the late 1930s. He won two gold medals in the four-man event at the FIBT World Championships, earning them in 1937 and 1938.

== Biography ==
Looker was born in London on 26 February 1913. After his education at Eton College and Trinity College, Cambridge, he went on to enjoy a playboy lifestyle during the 1930s. Typically, he spent much of the summer in the south of France and the winter months in Switzerland. A capable skier, he joined The Alpine Ski Club, but it was with the St. Moritz Tobogganing Club (SMTC) that he demonstrated true sporting prowess, as a winner on the Cresta Run. After winning a sweepstake, he used the proceeds to purchase life-membership of the SMTC. However, his best performance was with the British Bobsleigh Association. He missed out on being part of the four-man bobsleigh team for the 1936 Winter Olympics in Garmisch-Partenkirchen, Germany because he had already planned a round-the-world cruise for that year. He soon made up for his absence, becoming a double gold medal winner over two consecutive years for the four-man event at the FIBT World Championships: at St Moritz, in 1937; and, at Garmisch-Partenkirchen, in 1938.

In August 1938, Looker was commissioned into Auxiliary Air Force, joining 615 Squadron, whose honorary commander was Winston Churchill. He was a veteran of the Battle of France and was shot down flying over Belgium: he was forced to bail out of his aeroplane and was injured on landing. After a period of convalescence, he returned to active duties; just in time to take part in the Battle of Britain. On 18 August 1940 his squadron's aerodrome at Kenley was one of several attacked by the Luftwaffe. His own machine was under repair at the time; so, he had to requisition an older aircraft – a Mark I Hawker Hurricane - kept in reserve as a spare. Soon after engaging the enemy, however, his aeroplane was hit and badly damaged by cannon fire from a Messerschmidt 109, forcing him out of the battle. Unable to get back to base, he crash landed at Croydon Airport. After this, he did not return to active service; but was sent off to Canada, on training duties. During the latter part of the war, he returned home and was assigned to the Air Ministry; where, among other things, he worked on the preparations for the D-Day landings.

After the war, Looker got involved with a number of business ventures, including a project to develop a form of automatic transmission for the car industry. Despite coming up with a viable design, he and his partners were unable to convince any British car manufacturer of its potential; almost inevitably, it was the U.S. auto industry which made the breakthrough and went on to establish automatic transmission as a standard feature in car production. A lifelong passion for cars led to employment with a number of leading motor distributors, and he eventually became managing director of H.A. Fox & Co. He married in 1953 and retired in 1980. After a short illness, he died on 13 January 1995.

Looker's name is listed on The Battle of Britain Memorial, Victoria Embankment, London. The Hawker Hurricane he flew was subsequently restored and is now on permanent display at The Science Museum, in South Kensington, London.
