= Walter Steinbauer =

West German bobsledder

Medal record

Men's bobsleigh

Representing West Germany

Olympic Games
Bronze medal – third place	1972 Sapporo	Four-man

World Championships
Gold medal – first place	1969 Lake Placid	Four-man
Silver medal – second place	1970 St. Moritz	Four-man
Bronze medal – third place	1971 Cervinia	Four-man
Bronze medal – third place	1973 Lake Placid	Four-man

European Championships
Gold medal – first place	1970 Cortina d'Ampezzo	Four-man

Walter Steinbauer (20 January 1945 in Dissen am Teutoburger Wald – 28 May 1991) was a West German bobsledder who competed from the late 1960s to the mid-1970s. He won a bronze medal in the four-man event at the 1972 Winter Olympics in Sapporo.

Steinbauer also won four medals in the four-man event at the FIBT World Championships with one gold (1969), one silver (1970, and two bronzes (1971, 1973).
