= Alberto Righini =

Italian bobsledder

Medal record

Bobsleigh

World Championships
| Silver medal – second place | 1959 St. Moritz | Four-man |
| Bronze medal – third place | 1958 Garmisch-Partenkirchen | Four-man |

Alberto Righini was an Italian bobsledder who competed in the late 1950s. He won two medals in the four-man event at the FIBT World Championships with a silver in 1959 and a bronze in 1958.
