= Jeans Coops =

Belgian bobsledder

Medal record

Bobsleigh

World Championships
Gold medal – first place	1939 St. Moritz	Two-man

Jeans Coops was a Belgian bobsledder who competed in the late 1930s. He won a gold medal in the two-man event at the 1939 FIBT World Championships in St. Moritz.
