= Jean Prahm =

American bobsledder

Medal record

Bobsleigh

World Championships
Silver medal – second place	2000 Winterberg	Two-woman
Silver medal – second place	2001 Calgary	Two-woman
Bronze medal – third place	2004 Königssee	Two-woman

Jean Prahm (formerly Jean Racine, born September 20, 1978) is an American bobsledder who competed from 1996 to 2006. She won three medals in the two-woman event at the FIBT World Championships with two silvers (2000, 2001) and a bronze (2004). Prahm, then known by her maiden name of Jean Racine, won the Bobsleigh World Cup season title in the two-woman event both in 1999-2000 and 2000–1. Earned the nickname "mean jean" after kicking off her bobsled partner just prior to the 2002 Olympics.

Prahm competed in the Olympics twice in the women's bobsleigh doubles, in 2002 and 2006. In 2002, Prahm competed in women's bobsledding during its first appearance as an Olympic sport. Prahm and her partner, Gea Johnson, finished fifth. In 2006, in Torino, Italy, Prahm finished in sixth place.

A native of Waterford, Michigan, Prahm is also a business major at the University of Utah and is pursuing a singing career.

Today, Prahm lives in North Liberty, Iowa with her husband and three children. She also serves as an athlete representative for the selection team for the United States women's bobsled teams.
