= Lincoln DeWitt =

American skeleton racer (born 1967)

Medal record

Skeleton

World Championships
Bronze medal – third place	2001 Calgary	Men

Lincoln DeWitt (born April 24, 1967) is an American skeleton racer who competed from 1997 to 2004. He won a bronze medal in the men's skeleton event at the 2001 FIBT World Championships in Calgary.

A native of Syracuse, New York, who also grew up in Pownal, Vermont, DeWitt graduated from the University of Pennsylvania with an economics degree. He also finished fifth in the men's skeleton event at the 2002 Winter Olympics in Salt Lake City.

DeWitt also won the men's Skeleton World Cup overall title in 2000-1.
