= FIBT World Championships 1973 =

Winter sport competition

1973 World Championships
- Location: Lake Placid, New York

The FIBT World Championships 1973 took place in Lake Placid, New York, United States for the fourth time, hosting the event previously in 1949, 1961, and 1969.

== Two man bobsleigh ==
Pos	Team	Time
Gold	West Germany (Wolfgang Zimmerer, Peter Utzschneider)	
Silver	Switzerland (Hans Candrian, Heinz Schenker)	
Bronze	Romania (Ion Panţuru, Dumitru Focseneanu)	

== Four man bobsleigh ==
Pos	Team	Time
Gold	Switzerland (René Stadler, Werner Carmichel, Erich Schärer, Peter Schärer)	
Silver	Austria (Werner Delle Karth, Walter Delle Karth, Hans Eichinger, Fritz Sperling)	
Bronze	West Germany (Wolfgang Zimmerer, Stefan Gaisreiter, Walter Steinbauer, Peter Utzschneider)	

== Medal table ==
Rank	Nation	Gold	Silver	Bronze	Total
1	Switzerland (SUI)	1	1	0	2
2	West Germany (FRG)	1	0	1	2
3	Austria (AUT)	0	1	0	1
4	Romania (ROU)	0	0	1	1
Totals (4 entries)		2	2	2	6
