= Parker Vooris =

American bobsledder

Medal record

Bobsleigh

World Championships
Gold medal – first place	1959 St. Moritz	Four-man

Parker Baldwin Vooris, Jr. (April 27, 1912 – May 26, 1991) was an American bobsledder who competed in the late 1950s. He won a gold medal in the four-man event at the 1959 FIBT World Championships in St. Moritz. Vooris was also a farmer during the 1970s.
