= Donald Fox (bobsleigh) =

American bobsledder

Medal record

Bobsleigh

World Championships
Bronze medal – third place	1937 St. Moritz	Four-man

Donald Fox was an American bobsledder who competed in the late 1930s. He won a bronze medal in the four-man event at the 1937 FIBT World Championships in St. Moritz.
