= FIBT World Championships 1938 =

Winter sport competition

1938 World Championships
- Location: St. Moritz, Switzerland; Garmisch-Partenkirchen, Germany

The FIBT World Championships 1938 took place in St. Moritz, Switzerland (Two-man) and Garmisch-Partenkirchen, Germany (Four-man). St. Moritz hosted the two-man event for the first time after hosting the four-man event previously in 1931, 1935, and 1937 while Garmisch-Partenkirchen hosted the four-man event previously in 1934.

== Two man bobsleigh ==
Pos	Team	Time
Gold	Germany (Bibo Fischer, Rolf Thielecke)	
Silver	United Kingdom (Frederick McEvoy, Charles Green)	
Bronze	Switzerland (Fritz Feierabend, Josef Beerli)	

== Four man bobsleigh ==
Pos	Team	Time
Gold	United Kingdom (Frederick McEvoy, David Looker, Charles Green, Chris MacKintosh)	
Silver	Germany (Hanns Killian, Werner Windhaus, Bobby Braumiller, Franz Kemser)	
Bronze	Germany (Gerhard Fischer, Lohfeld, H. Fischer, Rolf Thielecke)	

== Medal table ==
Rank	Nation	Gold	Silver	Bronze	Total
1	Germany (GER)	1	1	1	3
2	Great Britain (GBR)	1	1	0	2
3	Switzerland (SUI)	0	0	1	1
Totals (3 entries)		2	2	2	6
