= FIBT World Championships 1937 =

Winter sport competition

1937 World Championships
- Location: Cortina d'Ampezzo, Italy; St. Moritz, Switzerland

The FIBT World Championships 1937 took place in Cortina d'Ampezzo, Italy (Two-man) and in St. Moritz, Switzerland (Four-man). St. Moritz hosted the four-man event previously in 1931 and 1935.

== Two man bobsleigh ==
Pos	Team	Time
Gold	United Kingdom (Frederick McEvoy, Byran Black)	
Silver	Italy (Uberto Gillarduzzi, Sisto Gillarduzzi)	
Bronze	Switzerland (Reto Capadrutt, Hans Aichele)	

== Four man bobsleigh ==
Pos	Team	Time
Gold	United Kingdom (Frederick McEvoy, David Looker, Charles Green, Byran Black)	
Silver	Germany (Gerhard Fischer, Lohfeld, H. Fischer, Rolf Thielecke)	
Bronze	United States (Donald Fox, Tippi Gray, Bill Dupree, James Bickford)	

The American team became the first non-Europeans to medal at the championships.

== Medal table ==
Rank	Nation	Gold	Silver	Bronze	Total
1	Great Britain (GBR)	2	0	0	2
2	Germany (GER)	0	1	0	1
2	Italy (ITA)	0	1	0	1
4	Switzerland (SUI)	0	0	1	1
4	United States (USA)	0	0	1	1
Totals (5 entries)		2	2	2	6
