= Bobsleigh and Skeleton European Championship =

Main bobsleigh and skeleton championships in Europe

European Bobsleigh and Skeleton Championships
- Status: active
- Genre: sports event
- Date: January–March
- Frequency: annual
- Inaugurated: 1929
- Organiser: IBSF

The European Bobsleigh and Skeleton Championships are the main bobsleigh and skeleton championships in Europe. The first bobsleigh European Championships with two-man event was held in 1929 in Davos, Switzerland. However, as Bobsleigh World Championships started to be held on an annual basis since following year, European Championships didn't resumed until 1965. A four-man event was included in 1967 when first combined championship occurred. The men's European Skeleton Championships were held separately in 1981–1988 before resuming in 2003 when women's skeleton event was added as well. In 2004 the first women's European Bobsleigh Championship was held with two-woman event. The following year both the women's bobsleigh and skeleton events were merged with the men's bobsleigh events at the European Championships. Since then, all bobsleigh and skeleton events are usually competes at the same time and venue (with few exceptions). Women's monobob event was included in 2022.

Starting from 1985, IBSF European Championships are being held on annual basis within a preselected World Cup stages in the so-called race-in-race mode (with few exceptions when European Championships were held separately). The results of non-European athletes at these World Cup stages are not counted for European Championships standings.

== Bobsleigh ==
Numbers in brackets denotes number of victories in corresponding disciplines. Boldface denotes record number of victories.

=== Two-man ===
| Location | | Gold | Silver | Bronze |
|---|---|---|---|---|
| 1929 | (Switzerland) Davos | Netherlands Eddie van de Pol; Piet Metzelaar | Germany M. Volk; H. Strelin | Great Britain B. A. J. Qutram; C. M. Qutram |
| 1965 | (Italy) Cortina d’Ampezzo | Austria Erwin Thaler; Adolf Koxeder | Italy Erwin Moser; Enzo Pierini | Italy Angelo Frigerio; Sergio Mocelli |
| 1966 | (Germany) Garmisch-Partenkirchen | Austria Erwin Thaler; Adolf Koxeder (2) | Austria Manfred Hofer; Karl Pichler | West Germany Anton Pensberger; Helmut Wurzer |
| 1967 | (Austria) Igls | Austria Erwin Thaler; Reinhold Durnthaler | Romania Ion Panțuru; Nicolae Naegoe | West Germany Wolfgang Zimmerer; Peter Utzschneider |
| 1968 | (Switzerland) St. Moritz | West Germany Wolfgang Zimmerer; Peter Utzschneider | Great Britain Patrick Evely; Toni Fields | Great Britain John Blockey; Mike Freeman |
| 1969 | (Italy) Cervinia | Austria Erwin Thaler (4); Reinhold Durnthaler (2) | Romania Ion Panțuru; Dumitru Focşeneanu | Italy Bruno Servadei; Andrea Clemente |
| 1970 | (Italy) Cortina d’Ampezzo | Italy Gianfranco Gaspari; Mario Armano | West Germany Horst Floth; Pepi Bader | West Germany Wolfgang Zimmerer; Peter Utzschneider |
| 1971 | (Germany) Königssee | West Germany Horst Floth; Pepi Bader | Switzerland Hans Candrian; Peter Schärer | West Germany Wolfgang Zimmerer; Peter Utzschneider |
| 1972 | (Switzerland) St. Moritz | West Germany Wolfgang Zimmerer; Peter Utzschneider | West Germany Horst Floth; Pepi Bader | Switzerland Jean Wicki; Edy Hubacher |
| 1973 | (Italy) Cervinia | West Germany Wolfgang Zimmerer (3); Peter Utzschneider (3) | West Germany Horst Floth; Willi Holdorf | Austria Walter Delle Karth jun. Fritz Sperling |
| 1976 | (Switzerland) St. Moritz | Switzerland Erich Schärer; Peter Schärer | West Germany Stefan Gaisreiter; Donat Ertel | Switzerland Fritz Lüdi; Karl Häseli |
| 1978 | (Austria) Igls | East Germany Horst Schönau; Harald Seifert | East Germany Bernhard Germeshausen; Hans-Jürgen Gerhardt | East Germany Bernhard Lehmann; Matthias Trübner |
| 1979 | (Germany) Winterberg | East Germany Bernhard Germeshausen; Hans-Jürgen Gerhardt | Switzerland Erich Schärer; Ulrich Bächli | East Germany Meinhard Nehmer; Bogdan Musioł |
| 1980 | (Switzerland) St. Moritz | Switzerland Hans Hiltebrand; Walter Rahm | East Germany Bernhard Germeshausen; Hans-Jürgen Gerhardt | Switzerland Erich Schärer; Ulrich Bächli |
| 1981 | (Austria) Igls | Switzerland Hans Hiltebrand (2); Walter Rahm (2) | East Germany Bernhard Germeshausen; Hans-Jürgen Gerhardt | West Germany Wolfgang Eidenschink; Andreas Geiger |
| 1982 | (Italy) Cortina d’Ampezzo | Switzerland Erich Schärer (2); Max Rüegg | East Germany Horst Schönau; Andreas Kirchner | Switzerland Hans Hiltebrand; Ulrich Bächli |
| 1983 | (Socialist Federal Republic of Yugoslavia) Sarajevo | East Germany Bernhard Lehmann; Bogdan Musioł | East Germany Bernhard Germeshausen; Hans-Jürgen Gerhardt | Switzerland Ralph Pichler; Urs Leuthold |
| 1984 | (Austria) Igls | Soviet Union Jānis Ķipurs; Aivars Šnepsts | East Germany Detlef Richter; Dietmar Jerke | Soviet Union Zintis Ekmanis; Vladimir Aleksandrov |
| 1985 | (Switzerland) St. Moritz | Soviet Union Zintis Ekmanis; Vladimir Aleksandrov | East Germany Wolfgang Hoppe; Dietmar Schauerhammer | Switzerland Hans Hiltebrand; Meinhard Müller |
| 1986 | (Austria) Igls | East Germany Wolfgang Hoppe; Dietmar Schauerhammer | East Germany Bernhard Lehmann; Bogdan Musioł | East Germany Detlef Richter; Steffen Grummt |
| 1987 | (Italy) Cervinia | East Germany Wolfgang Hoppe (2); Dietmar Schauerhammer (2) | Soviet Union Jānis Ķipurs; Vladimir Aleksandrov | Switzerland Gustav Weder; Bruno Gerber |
| 1988 | (Socialist Federal Republic of Yugoslavia) Sarajevo | East Germany Volker Dietrich; Heiko Querner; Peter Förster (Note: Förster replaced the injured Querner after the first heat of the 1988 event.) | Switzerland Nico Baracchi; Donat Acklin | Soviet Union Vyacheslav Savlev; Aleksey Golovin |
| 1989 | (Germany) Winterberg | Switzerland Gustav Weder; Bruno Gerber | East Germany Wolfgang Hoppe; Bogdan Musioł | West Germany Rudi Lochner; Markus Zimmermann |
| 1990 | (Austria) Igls | Switzerland Gustav Weder; Curdin Morell | Soviet Union Zintis Ekmanis; Juris Tone | Soviet Union Māris Poikāns; Andrey Gorokhov |
| 1991 | (Italy) Cervinia | Switzerland Gustav Weder; Bruno Gerber (2) | Germany Volker Dietrich; Peer Joechel | Italy Günther Huber; Stefano Ticci |
| 1992 | (Germany) Königssee | Switzerland Gustav Weder; Donat Acklin | Germany Christoph Langen; Günther Eger | Germany Sepp Dostthaler; Mike Sehr |
| 1993 | (Switzerland) St. Moritz | Switzerland Gustav Weder (5); Donat Acklin (2) | Switzerland Celeste Poltera; Marco Battaglia | Germany Sepp Dostthaler; Mike Sehr |
| 1994 | (France) La Plagne | Germany Christoph Langen; Peer Joechel | Italy Günther Huber; Stefano Ticci | Switzerland Gustav Weder; Donat Acklin |
| 1995 | (Germany) Altenberg | Germany Christoph Langen; Kai-Uwe Kohlert | Germany René Spies; Sven Peter | Switzerland Reto Götschi; Guido Acklin |
| 1996 | (Switzerland) St. Moritz | Germany Christoph Langen; Olaf Hampel | Switzerland Reto Götschi; Guido Acklin | Germany Sepp Dostthaler; Thomas Platzer |
| 1997 | (Germany) Königssee | Italy Günther Huber; Antonio Tartaglia | Germany Sepp Dostthaler; Thomas Platzer | Switzerland Reto Götschi; Guido Acklin |
| 1998 | (Austria) Igls | Switzerland Reto Götschi; Guido Acklin | Germany Christoph Langen; Olaf Hampel | Italy Günther Huber; Antonio Tartaglia |
| 1999 | (Germany) Winterberg | Switzerland Reto Götschi (2); Guido Acklin (2) | Switzerland Christian Reich; Urs Aeberhard | Germany Sepp Dostthaler; Olaf Hampel |
| 2000 | (Italy) Cortina d’Ampezzo | Germany André Lange; René Hoppe | Italy Günther Huber; Ubaldo Ranzi | Germany Christoph Langen; Markus Zimmermann |
| 2001 | (Germany) Königssee | Germany Christoph Langen; Markus Zimmermann | Switzerland Christian Reich; Steve Anderhub | Germany René Spies; Franz Sagmeister |
| 2002 | (Italy) Cortina d’Ampezzo | Switzerland Christian Reich; Steve Anderhub | Germany André Lange; Kevin Kuske | Switzerland Martin Annen; Beat Hefti |
| 2003 | (Germany) Winterberg | Germany René Spies; Marco Jakobs | Germany André Lange; Kevin Kuske | Switzerland Ralph Rüegg; Beat Hefti |
| 2004 | (Switzerland) St. Moritz | Germany Christoph Langen (5); Christoph Heyder | Switzerland Ivo Rüegg; Beat Hefti | Germany André Lange; Kevin Kuske |
| 2005 | (Germany) Altenberg | Germany André Lange; Martin Putze | Germany René Spies; Franz Sagmeister | Switzerland Martin Annen; Beat Hefti |
| 2006 | (Switzerland) St. Moritz | Germany André Lange; Kevin Kuske | Switzerland Ivo Rüegg; Cédric Grand | Switzerland Martin Annen; Beat Hefti |
| 2007 | (Italy) Cortina d’Ampezzo | Czech Republic Ivo Danilevič; Roman Gomola | Switzerland Ivo Rüegg; Cédric Grand | Germany André Lange; Kevin Kuske |
| 2008 | (Italy) Cesana | Russia Alexandr Zubkov; Alexey Voyevoda | Germany André Lange; Kevin Kuske | Italy Simone Bertazzo; Samuele Romanini |
| 2009 | (Switzerland) St. Moritz | Germany André Lange (4); Martin Putze (2) | Switzerland Beat Hefti; Thomas Lamparter | Germany Thomas Florschütz; Marc Kühne |
| 2010 | (Austria) Igls | Switzerland Beat Hefti; Thomas Lamparter | Germany André Lange; Kevin Kuske | Switzerland Daniel Schmid; Jürg Egger |
| 2011 | (Germany) Winterberg | Russia Alexandr Zubkov (2); Alexey Voyevoda (2) | Germany Thomas Florschütz; Kevin Kuske | Germany Karl Angerer; Alexander Mann |
| 2012 | (Germany) Altenberg | Germany Thomas Florschütz; Kevin Kuske (2) | Germany Maximilian Arndt; Marko Hübenbecker | Switzerland Beat Hefti; Thomas Lamparter |
| 2013 | (Austria) Igls | Switzerland Beat Hefti; Thomas Lamparter (2) | Germany Thomas Florschütz; Kevin Kuske | Germany Francesco Friedrich; Jannis Baecker |
| 2014 | (Germany) Königssee | Switzerland Beat Hefti; Alex Baumann | Switzerland Rico Peter; Thomas Lamparter | Germany Thomas Florschütz; Kevin Kuske |
| 2015 | (France) La Plagne | Germany Francesco Friedrich; Martin Grothkopp | Latvia Oskars Melbārdis; Daumants Dreiškens | Switzerland Rico Peter; Bror van der Zijde |
| 2016 | (Switzerland) St. Moritz | Switzerland Beat Hefti (4); Alex Baumann (2) | Germany Nico Walther; Christian Poser | Germany Maximilian Arndt; Kevin Kuske |
| 2017 | (Germany) Winterberg | Germany Francesco Friedrich; Thorsten Margis | Germany Johannes Lochner; Joshua Bluhm | Latvia Oskars Ķibermanis; Matīss Miknis |
| 2018 | (Austria) Igls | Germany Francesco Friedrich; Thorsten Margis | Switzerland Clemens Bracher; Michael Kuonen | Germany Johannes Lochner; Joshua Bluhm |
| 2019 | (Germany) Königssee | Germany Francesco Friedrich; Martin Grothkopp (2) | Germany Johannes Lochner; Christian Rasp | France Romain Heinrich; Dorian Hauterville |
| 2020 | (Latvia) Sigulda | Latvia Oskars Ķibermanis; Matīss Miknis | Switzerland Simon Friedli; Gregory Jones | Germany Christoph Hafer; Christian Hammers |
| 2021 | (Germany) Winterberg | Germany Francesco Friedrich; Thorsten Margis | Germany Johannes Lochner; Eric Franke | Austria Benjamin Maier; Markus Sammer |
| 2022 | (Switzerland) St. Moritz | Germany Francesco Friedrich; Thorsten Margis (4) | Germany Johannes Lochner; Florian Bauer | Russia Rostislav Gaitiukevich; Mikhail Mordasov |
| 2023 | (Germany) Altenberg | Germany Johannes Lochner; Erec Bruckert | Switzerland Michael Vogt; Sandro Michel | Germany Francesco Friedrich; Alexander Schüller |
| 2024 | (Latvia) Sigulda | Germany Adam Ammour; Issam Ammour | Switzerland Michael Vogt; Sandro Michel | Germany Johannes Lochner; Erec Bruckert |
| 2025 | (Norway) Lillehammer | Germany Francesco Friedrich **(7)**; Alexander Schüller | Germany Johannes Lochner; Georg Fleischhauer | Great Britain Brad Hall; Taylor Lawrence |
| 2026 | (Switzerland) St. Moritz | Germany Johannes Lochner (2); Georg Fleischhauer | Germany Francesco Friedrich; Alexander Schüller | Great Britain Brad Hall; Taylor Lawrence |

Medal table

| Rank | Nation | Gold | Silver | Bronze | Total |
|---|---|---|---|---|---|
| 1 | Germany | 21 | 21 | 17 | 59 |
| 2 | Switzerland | 16 | 16 | 17 | 49 |
| 3 | East Germany | 6 | 9 | 3 | 18 |
| 4 | West Germany | 4 | 4 | 6 | 14 |
| 5 | Austria | 4 | 1 | 2 | 7 |
| 6 | Italy | 2 | 3 | 5 | 10 |
| 7 | Soviet Union | 2 | 2 | 3 | 7 |
| 8 | Russia | 2 | 0 | 1 | 3 |
| 9 | Latvia | 1 | 1 | 1 | 3 |
| 10 | Czech Republic | 1 | 0 | 0 | 1 |
| 10 | Netherlands | 1 | 0 | 0 | 1 |
| 12 | Romania | 0 | 2 | 0 | 2 |
| 13 | Great Britain | 0 | 1 | 4 | 5 |
| 14 | France | 0 | 0 | 1 | 1 |
| Totals (14 entries) | | **60** | **60** | **60** | **180** |

=== Four-man ===
| Location | | Gold | Silver | Bronze |
|---|---|---|---|---|
| 1967 | (Austria) Igls | Romania Ion Panțuru; Nicolae Neagoe; Petre Hristovici; Gheorghe Maftei | Austria Erwin Thaler; Reinhold Durnthaler; Herbert Gruber; Adolf Koxeder | West Germany Franz Wörmann; Hubert Braun; Klaus Ostler; Josef Gerg |
| 1968 | (Switzerland) St. Moritz | Switzerland Jean Wicki; Hans Candrian; Willi Hofmann; Walter Graf | Romania Ion Panțuru; Petre Hristovici; Nicolae Neagoe; Gheorghe Maftei | Great Britain John Blockey; Timothy Thorn; John Brown; Mike Freeman |
| 1969 | (Italy) Cervinia | Italy Alberto Frigo; Gino Basuino; Antonio Brancaccio; Luciano De Paolis | Romania Ion Panțuru; Dumitru Focşeneanu; Raimond Ţancov; Nicolae Neagoe | West Germany Herbert Pitka; Leonhard Samm; Hermann Pschorr; Franz Frey |
| 1970 | (Italy) Cortina d’Ampezzo | West Germany Wolfgang Zimmerer; Stefan Gaisreiter; Walter Steinbauer; Peter Utzschneider | Spain Eugenio Baturone; Julio Satorre; José Manuel Pérez; Guillermo Rosal | Romania Ion Panțuru; Nicolae Neagoe; Dumitru Pascu; Ion Zangor |
| 1971 | (Austria) Igls | Romania Ion Panțuru (2); Ion Zangor; Dumitru Pascu; Dumitru Focşeneanu | West Germany Wolfgang Zimmerer; Stefan Gaisreiter; Walter Steinbauer; Peter Utzschneider | West Germany Horst Floth; Donat Ertel; Jan Thölke; Pepi Bader |
| 1972 | (Switzerland) St. Moritz | Switzerland Hansruedi Müller; Herbert Ott; Rudolf Born; Hans Hiltebrand | West Germany Herbert Pitka; Hermann Pschorr; Helmut Wurzer; Franz Frey | Austria Werner Delle Karth; Fritz Sperling; Walter Delle Karth jun. Werner Moser |
| 1973 | (Italy) Cervinia | West Germany Wolfgang Zimmerer (2); Peter Utzschneider (2); Stefan Gaisreiter; Fritz Ohlwärter | Switzerland Fritz Lüdi; Thomas Hagen; Ferdi Müller; Karl Häseli | Switzerland René Stadler; Werner Camichel; Erich Schärer; Peter Schärer |
| 1976 | (Switzerland) St. Moritz | West Germany Stefan Gaisreiter (3); Hans Wagner; Donat Ertel; Walter Gillik | West Germany Wolfgang Zimmerer; Peter Utzschneider; Bodo Bittner; Manfred Schumann | Switzerland Erich Schärer; Peter Schärer; Werner Camichel; Joseph Benz |
| 1978 | (Austria) Igls | Austria Fritz Sperling; Franz Köfel; Franz Rednack; Walter Köck | East Germany Meinhard Nehmer; Hans-Jürgen Gerhardt; Bernhard Germeshausen; Raimund Bethge | East Germany Horst Schönau; Horst Bernhardt; Harald Seifert; Bogdan Musioł |
| 1979 | (Germany) Winterberg | East Germany Meinhard Nehmer; Jochen Babock; Bernhard Germeshausen; Hans-Jürgen Gerhardt | Switzerland Erich Schärer; Ulrich Bächli; Tony Rüegg; Hans-Jörg Trachsel | East Germany Horst Schönau; Horst Bernhardt; Andreas Kirchner; Bogdan Musioł |
| 1980 | (Switzerland) St. Moritz | Switzerland Erich Schärer; Ulrich Bächli; Ruedi Marti; Joseph Benz | Switzerland Peter Schärer; Max Rüegg; Tony Rüegg; Hans-Jörg Trachsel | Switzerland Hans Hiltebrand; Ulrich Schindler; Walter Rahm; Armin Baumgartner |
| 1981 | (Austria) Igls | East Germany Bernhard Germeshausen (2); Matthias Trübner; Henry Gerlach; Hans-Jürgen Gerhardt (2) | East Germany Horst Schönau; Detlef Richter; Dietmar Jerke; Andreas Kirchner | East Germany Bernhard Lehmann; Bogdan Musioł; Roland Wetzig; Eberhard Weise |
| 1982 | (Italy) Cortina d’Ampezzo | Switzerland Ralph Pichler; Kurt Ott; Urs Leuthold; Georg Klaus | East Germany Detlef Richter; Michael Richter; Thomas Forch; Dietmar Jerke | Austria Walter Delle Karth jun. Günter Krispel; Johann Lindner; Ferdinand Grössing |
| 1983 | (Socialist Federal Republic of Yugoslavia) Sarajevo | Switzerland Ekkehard Fasser; Kurt Poletti; Hans Märcy; Rolf Strittmatter | East Germany Bernhard Lehmann; Bogdan Musioł; Ingo Voge; Eberhard Weise | Switzerland Silvio Giobellina; Urs Salzmann; Heinz Stettler; Rico Freiermuth |
| 1984 | (Austria) Igls | Switzerland Silvio Giobellina; Heinz Stettler; Urs Salzmann; Rico Freiermuth | East Germany Detlef Richter; Thomas Forch; Matthias Legler; Dietmar Jerke | Switzerland Ekkehard Fasser; Hans Märcy; Kurt Poletti; Rolf Strittmatter |
| 1985 | (Switzerland) St. Moritz | Switzerland Silvio Giobellina (2); Heinz Stettler (2); Urs Salzmann (2); Rico Freiermuth (2) | East Germany Wolfgang Hoppe; Roland Wetzig; Ingo Voge; Dietmar Schauerhammer | Switzerland Hans Hiltebrand; Urs Leuthold; Kurt Ott; Meinhard Müller |
| 1986 | (Austria) Igls | Switzerland Hans Hiltebrand (2); Kurt Meier; Erwin Fassbind; André Kisser | East Germany Bernhard Lehmann; Matthias Trübner; Ingo Voge; Bogdan Musioł | Austria Peter Kienast; Franz Siegl; Gerhard Redl; Christian Mark |
| 1987 | (Italy) Cervinia | East Germany Wolfgang Hoppe; Dietmar Schauerhammer; Roland Wetzig; Bogdan Musioł | Switzerland Ralph Pichler; Heinrich Notter; Edgar Dietsche; Celeste Poltera | Switzerland Ekkehard Fasser; Kurt Meier; Werner Stocker; Rolf Strittmatter |
| 1988 | (Socialist Federal Republic of Yugoslavia) Sarajevo | West Germany Christian Schebitz; Uwe Höring; Gerhard Oechsle; Leroy Hieber | East Germany Volker Dietrich; René Hannemann; Torsten Körner; Axel Kühn | Switzerland Silvio Giobellina; Curdin Morell; Urs Salzmann; Celeste Poltera |
| 1989 | (Germany) Winterberg | Austria Ingo Appelt; Harald Winkler; Gerhard Redl; Jürgen Mandl | East Germany Harald Czudaj; Tino Bonk; Karsten Brannasch; Peter Förster | Austria Peter Kienast; Thomas Schroll; Franz Siegl; Kurt Teigl |
| 1990 | (Austria) Igls | Austria Peter Kienast; Thomas Schroll; Martin Riedl; Johann Lindner | Austria Ingo Appelt; Gerhard Redl; Jürgen Mandl; Harald Winkler | Switzerland Gustav Weder; Bruno Gerber; Lorenz Schindelholz; Curdin Morell |
| 1991 | (Italy) Cervinia | Switzerland Gustav Weder; Bruno Gerber; Lorenz Schindelholz; Curdin Morell | Germany Dirk Wiese; Thorsten Wölm; Oliver Rogge; Olaf Hampel | Germany Volker Dietrich; Sven Rühr; Frank Jacob; Thomas Rex |
| 1992 | (Germany) Königssee | Germany Harald Czudaj; Tino Bonk; Axel Jang; Alexander Szelig | Austria Hubert Schösser; Hannes Conti; Martin Riedl; Gerhard Haidacher | Romania Paul Neagu; Laurențiu Budur; László Hodos; Costel Petrariu |
| 1993 | (Switzerland) St. Moritz | Switzerland Gustav Weder (2); Donat Acklin; Kurt Meier (2); Domenico Semeraro | Germany Dirk Wiese; Christoph Bartsch; Oliver Rogge; Wolfgang Haupt | Austria Hubert Schösser; Gerhard Redl; Harald Winkler; Gerhard Haidacher |
| 1994 | (France) La Plagne | Italy Günther Huber; Antonio Tartaglia; Stefano Ticci; Mirko Ruggiero | Great Britain Mark Tout; George Farell; Jason Wing; Lenny Paul | Germany Dirk Wiese; Christoph Bartsch; Michael Liekmeier; Wolfgang Haupt |
| 1995 | (Germany) Altenberg | Germany Wolfgang Hoppe (2); Ulf Hielscher; René Hannemann; Carsten Embach | Austria Hubert Schösser; Gerhard Redl; Thomas Schroll; Martin Schützenauer | Germany Harald Czudaj; Karsten Brannasch; Alexander Szelig; Udo Lehmann |
| 1996 | (Switzerland) St. Moritz | Germany Christoph Langen; Sven Rühr; Markus Zimmermann; Olaf Hampel | Germany Wolfgang Hoppe; Torsten Voss; Sven Peter; Carsten Embach | Switzerland Marcel Rohner; Markus Wasser; Thomas Schreiber; Roland Tanner |
| 1997 | (Germany) Königssee | Switzerland Reto Götschi; Guido Acklin; Daniel Giger; Beat Seitz | Switzerland Marcel Rohner; Markus Nüssli; Thomas Schreiber; Roland Tanner | Germany Dirk Wiese; Christoph Bartsch; Torsten Voss; Michael Liekmeier |
| 1998 | (Austria) Igls | Germany Harald Czudaj (2); Torsten Voss; Steffen Görmer; Alexander Szelig | Austria Hubert Schösser; Peter Leismüller; Erwin Arnold; Martin Schützenauer | Germany Christoph Langen; Markus Zimmermann; Kai-Uwe Kohlert; Olaf Hampel |
| 1999 | (Germany) Winterberg | Germany Christoph Langen (2); Markus Zimmermann (2); Thomas Platzer; Sven Rühr (2) | Switzerland Marcel Rohner; Markus Nüssli; Beat Hefti; Silvio Schaufelberger | Austria Wolfgang Stampfer; Jochen Buck; Erwin Arnold; Martin Schützenauer Germany Harald Czudaj; Torsten Voss; Udo Lehmann; Carsten Embach |
| 2000 | (Italy) Cortina d’Ampezzo | France Bruno Mingeon; Emmanuel Hostache; Christophe Fouquet; Max Robert | Latvia Sandis Prūsis; Mārcis Rullis; Matis Zacmanis; Jānis Ozols | Germany Christoph Langen; Sven Rühr; Thomas Patzer; Jörg Treffer |
| 2001 | (Germany) Königssee | Germany Matthias Benesch; Torsten Voss (2); Udo Lehmann; Alexander Szelig (3) | Germany Christoph Langen; Markus Zimmermann; Sven Peter; Alexander Metzger | Germany André Lange; Lars Behrendt; René Hoppe; Carsten Embach |
| 2002 | (Italy) Cortina d’Ampezzo | Germany André Lange; Enrico Kühn; Kevin Kuske; Carsten Embach (2) | France Bruno Mingeon; Éric Le Chanony; Christophe Fouquet; Max Robert | Germany Matthias Benesch; Torsten Voss; Udo Lehmann; Alexander Szelig |
| 2003 | (Germany) Winterberg | Latvia Sandis Prūsis; Jānis Silarājs; Mārcis Rullis; Jānis Ozols | Germany André Lange; René Hoppe; Enrico Kühn; Carsten Embach | Switzerland Martin Annen; Urs Aeberhard; Silvio Schaufelberger; Cédric Grand |
| 2004 | (Switzerland) St. Moritz | Germany André Lange; Udo Lehmann (2); Kevin Kuske; René Hoppe | Switzerland Ivo Rüegg; Ali Dincer; Beat Hefti; Christian Aebli | Germany Christoph Langen; Markus Zimmermann; Enrico Kühn; Alexander Metzger |
| 2005 | (Germany) Altenberg | Russia Alexandr Zubkov; Alexei Seliverstov; Sergey Golubev; Dmitry Stepushkin | Germany André Lange; René Hoppe; Thomas Pöge; Martin Putze | Germany Matthias Höpfner; Marc Kühne; Andreas Barucha; Stefan Barucha |
| 2006 | (Switzerland) St. Moritz | Switzerland Martin Annen; Thomas Lamparter; Beat Hefti; Cédric Grand | Germany André Lange; René Hoppe; Kevin Kuske; Martin Putze | Russia Alexandr Zubkov; Sergey Golubev; Alexei Seliverstov; Dmitry Stepushkin |
| 2007 | (Italy) Cortina d’Ampezzo | Germany André Lange; Alexander Rödiger; Kevin Kuske; Martin Putze | Russia Yevgeni Popov; Roman Oreshnikov; Dmitry Trunenkov; Dmitry Stepushkin | Switzerland Ivo Rüegg; Roman Handschin; Thomas Lamparter; Cédric Grand |
| 2008 | (Italy) Cesana | Latvia Jānis Miņins; Daumants Dreiškens; Oskars Melbārdis; Intars Dambis | Switzerland Martin Galliker; Jürg Egger; Olexander Streltsov; Patrick Blöchliger | Germany André Lange; René Hoppe; Kevin Kuske; Martin Putze |
| 2009 | (Switzerland) St. Moritz | Russia Alexandr Zubkov (2); Roman Oreshnikov; Dmitry Trunenkov; Dmitry Stepushkin (2) | Germany Thomas Florschütz; Marc Kühne; Andreas Barucha; Alexander Metzger | Germany Karl Angerer; Andreas Udvari; Thomas Pöge; Gregor Bermbach |
| 2010 | (Austria) Igls | Germany André Lange (4); René Hoppe (2); Kevin Kuske (4); Martin Putze | Switzerland Ivo Rüegg; Roman Handschin; Cédric Grand; Thomas Lamparter | Germany Thomas Florschütz; Ronny Listner; Richard Adjei; Andreas Barucha |
| 2011 | (Germany) Winterberg | Germany Manuel Machata; Richard Adjei; Andreas Bredau; Florian Becke | Germany Thomas Florschütz; Ronny Listner; Kevin Kuske; Andreas Barucha Russia Alexandr Zubkov; Filipp Yegorov; Dmitry Trunenkov; Nikolay Khrenkov | None awarded |
| 2012 | (Germany) Altenberg | Germany Maximilian Arndt; Alexander Rödiger; Marko Hübenbecker; Martin Putze | Russia Alexandr Zubkov; Filipp Yegorov; Dmitry Trunenkov; Nikolay Khrenkov | Germany Thomas Florschütz; Ronny Listner; Kevin Kuske; Thomas Blaschek |
| 2013 | (Austria) Igls | Germany Maximilian Arndt; Alexander Rödiger (3); Marko Hübenbecker (2); Martin Putze | Switzerland Beat Hefti; Alex Baumann; Thomas Lamparter; Juerg Egger | Germany Thomas Florschütz; Andreas Bredau; Kevin Kuske; Thomas Blaschek |
| 2014 | (Germany) Königssee | Switzerland Beat Hefti (2); Alex Baumann; Thomas Amrhein; Juerg Egger | Great Britain John James Jackson; Stuart Benson; Bruce Tasker; Joel Fearon | Germany Francesco Friedrich; Alex Mann; Gregor Bermbach; Thorsten Margis |
| 2015 | (France) La Plagne | Latvia Oskars Melbārdis (2); Daumants Dreiškens (2); Arvis Vilkaste; Jānis Strenga | Germany Francesco Friedrich; Candy Bauer; Martin Grothkopp; Thorsten Margis | Germany Nico Walther; Marko Hübenbecker; Andreas Bredau; Christian Poser |
| 2016 | (Switzerland) St. Moritz | Germany Maximilian Arndt (3); Kevin Korona; Martin Putze **(5)**; Ben Heber | Austria Benjamin Maier; Marco Rangl; Markus Sammer; Dănuț Moldovan | Latvia Oskars Melbārdis; Daumants Dreiškens; Arvis Vilkaste; Jānis Strenga |
| 2017 | (Germany) Winterberg | Germany Johannes Lochner; Sebastian Mrowka; Joshua Bluhm; Christian Rasp | Germany Nico Walther; Kevin Kuske; Kevin Korona; Eric Franke | Austria Benjamin Maier; Stefan Laussegger; Markus Sammer; Dănuț Moldovan |
| 2018 | (Austria) Igls | Germany Johannes Lochner; Marc Rademacher; Joshua Bluhm (2); Christian Rasp | Germany Francesco Friedrich; Candy Bauer; Martin Grothkopp; Thorsten Margis | Latvia Oskars Melbārdis; Daumants Dreiškens; Helvijs Lūsis; Jānis Strenga |
| 2019 | (Germany) Königssee | Germany Johannes Lochner; Florian Bauer; Marc Rademacher (2); Christian Rasp | Latvia Oskars Ķibermanis; Matīss Miknis; Arvis Vilkaste; Jānis Strenga | Germany Francesco Friedrich; Candy Bauer; Martin Grothkopp; Alexander Schüller |
| 2020 | (Germany) Winterberg | Germany Johannes Lochner; Florian Bauer; Christopher Weber; Christian Rasp (4) | Germany Francesco Friedrich; Candy Bauer; Alexander Schüller; Thorsten Margis | Germany Nico Walther; Paul Krenz; Kevin Korona; Eric Franke |
| 2021 | (Germany) Winterberg | Germany Francesco Friedrich; Thorsten Margis; Candy Bauer; Alexander Schüller | Austria Benjamin Maier; Sascha Stepan; Markus Sammer; Kristian Huber | Russia Rostislav Gaitiukevich; Mikhail Mordasov; Ilya Malykh; Ruslan Samitov |
| 2022 | (Switzerland) St. Moritz | Latvia Oskars Ķibermanis; Dāvis Spriņģis; Matīss Miknis; Edgars Nemme | Germany Francesco Friedrich; Martin Grothkopp; Alexander Rödiger; Alexander Schüller | Russia Rostislav Gaitiukevich; Mikhail Mordasov; Pavel Travkin; Alexey Laptev |
| 2023 | (Germany) Altenberg | Great Britain Brad Hall; Arran Gulliver; Taylor Lawrence; Greg Cackett | Germany Francesco Friedrich; Thorsten Margis; Candy Bauer; Felix Straub | Switzerland Michael Vogt; Cyril Bieri; Alain Knuser; Sandro Michel |
| 2024 | (Austria) Igls | Germany Francesco Friedrich (2); Candy Bauer (2); Alexander Schüller (2); Felix Straub | Germany Johannes Lochner; Erec Bruckert; Joshua Tasche; Georg Fleischhauer | Latvia Emīls Cipulis; Dāvis Spriņģis; Matīss Miknis; Krists Lindenblats |
| 2025 | (Norway) Lillehammer | Germany Johannes Lochner **(5)**; Florian Bauer (3); Jörn Wenzel; Georg Fleischhauer | Germany Francesco Friedrich; Matthias Sommer; Alexander Schüller; Felix Straub | Great Britain Brad Hall; Taylor Lawrence; Arran Gulliver; Leon Greenwood Switzerland Michael Vogt; Gregory Jones; Andreas Haas; Amadou David Ndiaye |
| 2026 | (Switzerland) St. Moritz | Germany Adam Ammour; Issam Ammour; Joshua Tasche; Alexander Schaller | Germany Johannes Lochner; Thorsten Margis; Jörn Wenzel; Georg Fleischhauer | Switzerland Michael Vogt; Dominik Hufschmid; Andreas Haas; Amadou David Ndiaye |

Medal table

| Rank | Nation | Gold | Silver | Bronze | Total |
|---|---|---|---|---|---|
| 1 | Germany | 22 | 18 | 20 | 60 |
| 2 | Switzerland | 13 | 10 | 15 | 38 |
| 3 | West Germany | 4 | 3 | 3 | 10 |
| 4 | Latvia | 4 | 2 | 3 | 9 |
| 5 | East Germany | 3 | 9 | 3 | 15 |
| 6 | Austria | 3 | 7 | 7 | 17 |
| 7 | Russia | 2 | 3 | 3 | 8 |
| 8 | Romania | 2 | 2 | 2 | 6 |
| 9 | Italy | 2 | 0 | 0 | 2 |
| 10 | Great Britain | 1 | 2 | 2 | 5 |
| 11 | France | 1 | 1 | 0 | 2 |
| 12 | Spain | 0 | 1 | 0 | 1 |
| Totals (12 entries) | | **57** | **58** | **58** | **173** |

=== Two-woman ===
| Location | | Gold | Silver | Bronze |
|---|---|---|---|---|
| 2004 | (Latvia) Sigulda | Germany Cathleen Martini; Sandra Germain | Germany Claudia Schramm; Nicole Herschmann | Switzerland Françoise Burdet; Karin Hagmann |
| 2005 | (Germany) Altenberg | Germany Cathleen Martini; Janine Tischer | Germany Sandra Kiriasis; Anja Schneiderheinze | Netherlands Ilse Broeders; Jeanette Pennings |
| 2006 | (Switzerland) St. Moritz | Germany Sandra Kiriasis; Anja Schneiderheinze | Italy Gerda Weissensteiner; Jennifer Isacco | Germany Susi Erdmann; Anne Dietrich |
| 2007 | (Italy) Cortina d’Ampezzo | Germany Sandra Kiriasis; Romy Logsch | Germany Cathleen Martini; Janine Tischer | Italy Jessica Gillarduzzi; Fabiana Mollica |
| 2008 | (Italy) Cesana | Germany Sandra Kiriasis; Berit Wiacker | Germany Cathleen Martini; Janine Tischer | Switzerland Maya Bamert; Anne Dietrich |
| 2009 | (Switzerland) St. Moritz | Germany Sandra Kiriasis; Berit Wiacker | Germany Cathleen Martini; Janine Tischer | Great Britain Nicola Minichiello; Gillian Cooke |
| 2010 | (Austria) Igls | Germany Cathleen Martini; Romy Logsch (2) | Switzerland Sabina Hafner; Hannelore Schenk | Germany Sandra Kiriasis; Christin Senkel |
| 2011 | (Germany) Winterberg | Germany Sandra Kiriasis; Berit Wiacker (3) | Germany Anja Schneiderheinze-Stöckel; Christin Senkel | Netherlands Esme Kamphuis; Judith Vis |
| 2012 | (Germany) Altenberg | Germany Cathleen Martini (4); Janine Tischer (2) | Germany Sandra Kiriasis; Petra Lammert | Switzerland Fabienne Meyer; Hannelore Schenk |
| 2013 | (Austria) Igls | Germany Sandra Kiriasis **(6)**; Franziska Bertels | Germany Anja Schneiderheinze-Stöckel; Lisette Thöne | Germany Cathleen Martini; Stephanie Schneider |
| 2014 | (Germany) Königssee | Switzerland Fabienne Meyer; Tanja Mayer | Germany Sandra Kiriasis; Franziska Fritz | Netherlands Esme Kamphuis; Judith Vis |
| 2015 | (France) La Plagne | Germany Anja Schneiderheinze-Stöckel; Franziska Bertels (2) | Germany Cathleen Martini; Stephanie Schneider | Germany Stefanie Szczurek; Erline Nolte |
| 2016 | (Switzerland) St. Moritz | Germany Anja Schneiderheinze-Stöckel (3); Annika Drazek | Belgium Elfje Willemsen; Sophie Vercruyssen | Germany Stephanie Schneider; Lisa Buckwitz |
| 2017 | (Germany) Winterberg | Germany Mariama Jamanka; Annika Drazek | Russia Nadezhda Sergeeva; Anastasia Kocherzhova | Austria Christina Hengster; Jennifer Jantina Oluumi Desire Onasanya |
| 2018 | (Austria) Igls | Germany Stephanie Schneider; Annika Drazek | Germany Mariama Jamanka; Lisa Buckwitz | Germany Anna Köhler; Ann-Christin Strack |
| 2019 | (Germany) Königssee | Germany Mariama Jamanka (2); Annika Drazek (4) | Germany Stephanie Schneider; Ann-Christin Strack | Austria Katrin Beierl; Jennifer Jantina Oluumi Desire Onasanya |
| 2020 | (Latvia) Sigulda | Russia Nadezhda Sergeeva; Elena Mamedova | Romania Andreea Grecu; Ioana Gheorghe | Germany Stephanie Schneider; Lisette Thöne |
| 2021 | (Germany) Winterberg | Germany Laura Nolte; Deborah Levi | Germany Kim Kalicki; Ann-Christin Strack | Austria Katrin Beierl; Jennifer Jantina Oluumi Desire Onasanya Germany Mariama Jamanka; Leonie Fiebig |
| 2022 | (Switzerland) St. Moritz | Germany Kim Kalicki; Lisa Buckwitz | Germany Mariama Jamanka; Kira Lipperheide | Germany Laura Nolte; Deborah Levi |
| 2023 | (Germany) Altenberg | Germany Laura Nolte; Neele Schuten | Switzerland Melanie Hasler; Nadja Pasternack | Germany Kim Kalicki; Anabel Galander |
| 2024 | (Latvia) Sigulda | Germany Laura Nolte; Neele Schuten (2) | Germany Kim Kalicki; Anabel Galander | Switzerland Melanie Hasler; Mara Morell |
| 2025 | (Norway) Lillehammer | Germany Laura Nolte (4); Leonie Kluwig | Germany Kim Kalicki; Leonie Fiebig | Germany Lisa Buckwitz; Kira Lipperheide |
| 2026 | (Switzerland) St. Moritz | Switzerland Melanie Hasler; Nadja Pasternack | Germany Laura Nolte; Leonie Kluwig | Germany Kim Kalicki; Talea Prepens |

Medal table

| Rank | Nation | Gold | Silver | Bronze | Total |
|---|---|---|---|---|---|
| 1 | Germany | 20 | 17 | 12 | 49 |
| 2 | Switzerland | 2 | 2 | 4 | 8 |
| 3 | Russia | 1 | 1 | 0 | 2 |
| 4 | Italy | 0 | 1 | 1 | 2 |
| 5 | Belgium | 0 | 1 | 0 | 1 |
| 5 | Romania | 0 | 1 | 0 | 1 |
| 7 | Austria | 0 | 0 | 3 | 3 |
| 7 | Netherlands | 0 | 0 | 3 | 3 |
| 9 | Great Britain | 0 | 0 | 1 | 1 |
| Totals (9 entries) | | **23** | **23** | **24** | **70** |

=== Women's Monobob ===
| Location | | Gold | Silver | Bronze |
|---|---|---|---|---|
| 2022 | (Switzerland) St. Moritz | Mariama Jamanka; Germany | Laura Nolte; Germany | Nadezhda Sergeeva; Russia |
| 2023 | (Germany) Altenberg | Laura Nolte; Germany | Andreea Grecu; Romania | Kim Kalicki; Germany |
| 2024 | (Latvia) Sigulda | Lisa Buckwitz; Germany | Andreea Grecu; Romania | Laura Nolte; Germany |
| 2025 | (Norway) Lillehammer | Laura Nolte **(2)**; Germany | Melanie Hasler; Switzerland | Lisa Buckwitz; Germany |
| 2026 | (Switzerland) St. Moritz | Melanie Hasler; Switzerland | Katrin Beierl; Austria | Laura Nolte; Germany |

Medal table

| Rank | Nation | Gold | Silver | Bronze | Total |
|---|---|---|---|---|---|
| 1 | Germany | 4 | 1 | 4 | 9 |
| 2 | Switzerland | 1 | 1 | 0 | 2 |
| 3 | Romania | 0 | 2 | 0 | 2 |
| 4 | Austria | 0 | 1 | 0 | 1 |
| 5 | Russia | 0 | 0 | 1 | 1 |
| Totals (5 entries) | | **5** | **5** | **5** | **15** |

== Skeleton ==
Numbers in brackets denotes number of victories in corresponding disciplines. Boldface denotes record number of victories.

=== Men's individual ===
| Location | | Gold | Silver | Bronze |
|---|---|---|---|---|
| 1981 | (Austria) Igls | Gert Elsässer; Austria | Christian Mark; Austria | Antonio Morelli; Italy |
| 1982 | (Germany) Königssee | Gert Elsässer (2); Austria | Franz Kleber; West Germany | Maurizio David; Italy |
| 1983 | (Austria) Igls | Alain Wicki; Switzerland | Gert Elsässer; Austria | Nico Baracchi; Switzerland |
| 1984 | (Germany) Winterberg | Nico Baracchi; Switzerland | Andi Schmid; Austria | Fred Martini; Austria |
| 1985 | (Socialist Federal Republic of Yugoslavia) Sarajevo | Nico Baracchi; Switzerland | Andi Schmid; Austria | Urs Vescoli; Switzerland |
| 1986 | (Switzerland) St. Moritz | Nico Baracchi (3); Switzerland | Andi Schmid; Austria | Erich Graf; Switzerland |
| 1987 | (Socialist Federal Republic of Yugoslavia) Sarajevo | Andi Schmid; Austria | Christian Auer; Austria | Alain Wicki; Switzerland |
| 1988 | (Germany) Winterberg | Alain Wicki (2); Switzerland | Andi Schmid; Austria | Franz Plangger; Austria |
| 2003 | (Switzerland) St. Moritz | Walter Stern; Austria | Gregor Stähli; Switzerland | Florian Grassl; Germany |
| 2004 | (Germany) Altenberg | Kristan Bromley; Great Britain | Gregor Stähli; Switzerland | Frank Kleber; Germany |
| 2005 | (Germany) Altenberg | Kristan Bromley; Great Britain | Frank Kleber; Germany | Matthias Biedermann; Germany |
| 2006 | (Switzerland) St. Moritz | Gregor Stähli; Switzerland | Frank Rommel; Germany | Markus Penz; Austria |
| 2007 | (Germany) Königssee | Aleksandr Tretyakov; Russia | Markus Penz; Austria | Tomass Dukurs; Latvia |
| 2008 | (Italy) Cesana | Kristan Bromley (3); Great Britain | Sebastian Haupt; Germany | Adam Pengilly; Great Britain |
| 2009 | (Switzerland) St. Moritz | Frank Rommel; Germany | Kristan Bromley; Great Britain | Gregor Stähli; Switzerland |
| 2010 | (Austria) Igls | Martins Dukurs; Latvia | Frank Rommel; Germany | Aleksandr Tretyakov; Russia |
| 2011 | (Germany) Winterberg | Martins Dukurs; Latvia | Sergey Chudinov; Russia | Aleksandr Tretyakov; Russia |
| 2012 | (Germany) Altenberg | Martins Dukurs; Latvia | Tomass Dukurs; Latvia | Alexander Kröckel; Germany |
| 2013 | (Austria) Igls | Martins Dukurs; Latvia | Aleksandr Tretyakov; Russia | Tomass Dukurs; Latvia |
| 2014 | (Germany) Königssee | Martins Dukurs; Latvia | Tomass Dukurs; Latvia | Frank Rommel; Germany |
| 2015 | (France) La Plagne | Martins Dukurs; Latvia | Aleksandr Tretyakov; Russia | Tomass Dukurs; Latvia |
| 2016 | (Switzerland) St. Moritz | Martins Dukurs; Latvia; Tomass Dukurs; Latvia | None awarded | Nikita Tregubov; Russia |
| 2017 | (Germany) Winterberg | Martins Dukurs; Latvia | Tomass Dukurs; Latvia | Aleksandr Tretyakov; Russia |
| 2018 | (Austria) Igls | Martins Dukurs; Latvia | Nikita Tregubov; Russia | Axel Jungk; Germany |
| 2019 | (Austria) Igls | Martins Dukurs; Latvia | Axel Jungk; Germany | Aleksandr Tretyakov; Russia |
| 2020 | (Latvia) Sigulda | Martins Dukurs; Latvia | Tomass Dukurs; Latvia | Felix Keisinger; Germany |
| 2021 | (Germany) Winterberg | Aleksandr Tretyakov (2); Russia | Martins Dukurs; Latvia | Alexander Gassner; Germany |
| 2022 | (Switzerland) St. Moritz | Martins Dukurs **(12)**; Latvia | Alexander Gassner; Germany | Christopher Grotheer; Germany |
| 2023 | (Germany) Altenberg | Matt Weston; Great Britain | Christopher Grotheer; Germany | Axel Jungk; Germany |
| 2024 | (Latvia) Sigulda | Marcus Wyatt; Great Britain | Matt Weston; Great Britain | Felix Keisinger; Germany |
| 2025 | (Norway) Lillehammer | Samuel Maier; Austria | Marcus Wyatt; Great Britain | Axel Jungk; Germany |
| 2026 | (Switzerland) St. Moritz | Matt Weston (2); Great Britain | Amedeo Bagnis; Italy | Christopher Grotheer; Germany |

Medal table

| Rank | Nation | Gold | Silver | Bronze | Total |
|---|---|---|---|---|---|
| 1 | Latvia | 13 | 5 | 3 | 21 |
| 2 | Great Britain | 6 | 3 | 1 | 10 |
| 3 | Switzerland | 6 | 2 | 5 | 13 |
| 4 | Austria | 5 | 8 | 3 | 16 |
| 5 | Russia | 2 | 4 | 5 | 11 |
| 6 | Germany | 1 | 7 | 13 | 21 |
| 7 | Italy | 0 | 1 | 2 | 3 |
| 8 | West Germany | 0 | 1 | 0 | 1 |
| Totals (8 entries) | | **33** | **31** | **32** | **96** |

=== Women's individual ===
| Location | | Gold | Silver | Bronze |
|---|---|---|---|---|
| 2003 | (Switzerland) St. Moritz | Monique Riekewald; Germany | Diana Sartor; Germany | Tanja Morel; Switzerland |
| 2004 | (Germany) Altenberg | Diana Sartor; Germany | Kerstin Jürgens; Germany | Steffi Jacob; Germany |
| 2005 | (Germany) Altenberg | Kerstin Jürgens; Germany | Maya Pedersen; Switzerland | Diana Sartor; Germany |
| 2006 | (Switzerland) St. Moritz | Maya Pedersen; Switzerland | Shelley Rudman; Great Britain | Tanja Morel; Switzerland |
| 2007 | (Germany) Königssee | Anja Huber; Germany | Maya Pedersen; Switzerland | Julia Eichhorn; Germany |
| 2008 | (Italy) Cesana | Anja Huber; Germany | Svetlana Trunova; Russia | Kerstin Jürgens; Germany |
| 2009 | (Switzerland) St. Moritz | Shelley Rudman; Great Britain | Marion Trott; Germany | Maya Pedersen; Switzerland |
| 2010 | (Austria) Igls | Anja Huber; Germany | Kerstin Szymkowiak; Germany | Shelley Rudman; Great Britain |
| 2011 | (Germany) Winterberg | Shelley Rudman (2); Great Britain | Anja Huber; Germany | Amy Williams; Great Britain |
| 2012 | (Germany) Altenberg | Anja Huber **(4)**; Germany | Katharina Heinz; Germany | Shelley Rudman; Great Britain |
| 2013 | (Austria) Igls | Elena Nikitina; Russia | Maria Orlova; Russia | Janine Flock; Austria |
| 2014 | (Germany) Königssee | Janine Flock; Austria | Shelley Rudman; Great Britain | Sophia Griebel; Germany; Anja Huber; Germany |
| 2015 | (Austria) Igls | Lizzy Yarnold; Great Britain | Janine Flock; Austria | Rose McGrandle; Great Britain |
| 2016 | (Switzerland) St. Moritz | Janine Flock; Austria | Tina Hermann; Germany | Marina Gilardoni; Switzerland |
| 2017 | (Germany) Winterberg | Jacqueline Lölling; Germany | Janine Flock; Austria | Tina Hermann; Germany |
| 2018 | (Austria) Igls | Elena Nikitina; Russia | Jacqueline Lölling; Germany | Janine Flock; Austria |
| 2019 | (Austria) Igls | Janine Flock; Austria | Elena Nikitina; Russia | Jacqueline Lölling; Germany |
| 2020 | (Latvia) Sigulda | Elena Nikitina; Russia | Marina Gilardoni; Switzerland | Janine Flock; Austria |
| 2021 | (Germany) Winterberg | Elena Nikitina **(4)**; Russia | Tina Hermann; Germany | Janine Flock; Austria |
| 2022 | (Switzerland) St. Moritz | Kimberley Bos; Netherlands | Janine Flock; Austria | Valentina Margaglio; Italy |
| 2023 | (Germany) Altenberg | Tina Hermann; Germany | Janine Flock; Austria | Susanne Kreher; Germany |
| 2024 | (Latvia) Sigulda | Kim Meylemans; Belgium | Hannah Neise; Germany | Amelia Coltman; Great Britain |
| 2025 | (Norway) Lillehammer | Janine Flock **(4)**; Austria | Amelia Coltman; Great Britain | Kimberley Bos; Netherlands |
| 2026 | (Switzerland) St. Moritz | Kim Meylemans (2); Belgium | Tabitha Stoecker; Great Britain | Jacqueline Pfeifer; Germany |

Medal table

| Rank | Nation | Gold | Silver | Bronze | Total |
|---|---|---|---|---|---|
| 1 | Germany | 9 | 10 | 10 | 29 |
| 2 | Austria | 4 | 4 | 4 | 12 |
| 3 | Russia | 4 | 3 | 0 | 7 |
| 4 | Great Britain | 3 | 4 | 5 | 12 |
| 5 | Belgium | 2 | 0 | 0 | 2 |
| 6 | Switzerland | 1 | 3 | 4 | 8 |
| 7 | Netherlands | 1 | 0 | 1 | 2 |
| 8 | Italy | 0 | 0 | 1 | 1 |
| Totals (8 entries) | | **24** | **24** | **25** | **73** |

=== Mixed team ===
| Location | | Gold | Silver | Bronze |
|---|---|---|---|---|
| 2026 | (Switzerland) St. Moritz | Germany Susanne Kreher; Axel Jungk | Italy Alessandra Fumagalli; Amedeo Bagnis | Great Britain Freya Tarbit; Jacob Salisbury |

Medal table

| Rank | Nation | Gold | Silver | Bronze | Total |
|---|---|---|---|---|---|
| 1 | Germany | 1 | 0 | 0 | 1 |
| 2 | Italy | 0 | 1 | 0 | 1 |
| 3 | Great Britain | 0 | 0 | 1 | 1 |
| Totals (3 entries) | | **1** | **1** | **1** | **3** |

== European Bobsleigh and Skeleton Championships cumulative medal count ==
- Updated after the IBSF European Championships 2026

=== Bobsleigh ===
| Rank | Nation | Gold | Silver | Bronze | Total |
|---|---|---|---|---|---|
| 1 | Germany | 67 | 57 | 53 | 177 |
| 2 | Switzerland | 32 | 29 | 36 | 97 |
| 3 | East Germany | 9 | 18 | 6 | 33 |
| 4 | West Germany | 8 | 7 | 9 | 24 |
| 5 | Austria | 7 | 9 | 12 | 28 |
| 6 | Russia | 5 | 4 | 5 | 14 |
| 7 | Latvia | 5 | 3 | 4 | 12 |
| 8 | Italy | 4 | 4 | 6 | 14 |
| 9 | Romania | 2 | 7 | 2 | 11 |
| 10 | Soviet Union | 2 | 2 | 3 | 7 |
| 11 | Great Britain | 1 | 3 | 7 | 11 |
| 12 | France | 1 | 1 | 1 | 3 |
| 13 | Netherlands | 1 | 0 | 3 | 4 |
| 14 | Czech Republic | 1 | 0 | 0 | 1 |
| 15 | Belgium | 0 | 1 | 0 | 1 |
| 15 | Spain | 0 | 1 | 0 | 1 |
| Totals (16 entries) | | 145 | 146 | 147 | 438 |

=== Skeleton ===
| Rank | Nation | Gold | Silver | Bronze | Total |
|---|---|---|---|---|---|
| 1 | Latvia | 13 | 5 | 3 | 21 |
| 2 | Germany | 11 | 17 | 23 | 51 |
| 3 | Austria | 9 | 12 | 7 | 28 |
| 4 | Great Britain | 9 | 7 | 7 | 23 |
| 5 | Switzerland | 7 | 5 | 9 | 21 |
| 6 | Russia | 6 | 7 | 5 | 18 |
| 7 | Belgium | 2 | 0 | 0 | 2 |
| 8 | Netherlands | 1 | 0 | 1 | 2 |
| 9 | Italy | 0 | 2 | 3 | 5 |
| 10 | West Germany | 0 | 1 | 0 | 1 |
| Totals (10 entries) | | 58 | 56 | 58 | 172 |

=== Overall ===
| Rank | Nation | Gold | Silver | Bronze | Total |
|---|---|---|---|---|---|
| 1 | Germany | 78 | 74 | 76 | 228 |
| 2 | Switzerland | 39 | 34 | 45 | 118 |
| 3 | Latvia | 18 | 8 | 7 | 33 |
| 4 | Austria | 16 | 21 | 19 | 56 |
| 5 | Russia | 11 | 11 | 10 | 32 |
| 6 | Great Britain | 10 | 10 | 14 | 34 |
| 7 | East Germany | 9 | 18 | 6 | 33 |
| 8 | West Germany | 8 | 8 | 9 | 25 |
| 9 | Italy | 4 | 6 | 9 | 19 |
| 10 | Romania | 2 | 7 | 2 | 11 |
| 11 | Soviet Union | 2 | 2 | 3 | 7 |
| 12 | Belgium | 2 | 1 | 0 | 3 |
| 13 | Netherlands | 2 | 0 | 4 | 6 |
| 14 | France | 1 | 1 | 1 | 3 |
| 15 | Czech Republic | 1 | 0 | 0 | 1 |
| 16 | Spain | 0 | 1 | 0 | 1 |
| Totals (16 entries) | | 203 | 202 | 205 | 610 |

== Most successful athletes (by number of victories) ==
Boldface denotes active athletes and highest medal count among all athletes (including these who not included in these tables) per type. "Position" denotes position of bobsledder in a crew (P – bobsledder won all own medals as a pilot; B – bobsledder won all own medals as a brakeman / brakewoman and / or as a pusher; B/P – bobsledder won own medals firstly as a brakeman / brakewoman and / or as a pusher and then as a pilot).

=== Men's Bobsleigh ===
| Rank | Bobsledder | Country | From | To | Gold | Silver | Bronze | Total | Position |
|---|---|---|---|---|---|---|---|---|---|
| 1 | **Francesco Friedrich** | Germany | 2013 | 2026 | **9** | 7 | 4 | 20 | P |
| 2 | André Lange | Germany | 2000 | 2010 | 8 | 7 | 4 | 19 | P |
| 3 | **Johannes Lochner** | Germany | 2017 | 2026 | 7 | 7 | 2 | 16 | P |
| 4 | Christoph Langen | Germany | 1992 | 2004 | 7 | 3 | 4 | 14 | P |
| 5 | Martin Putze | Germany | 2005 | 2016 | 7 | 2 | 1 | 10 | B |
| 6 | Gustav Weder | Switzerland | 1987 | 1994 | 7 | – | 3 | 10 | P |
| 7 | Kevin Kuske | Germany | 2002 | 2017 | 6 | **9** | **7** | **22** | B |
| 8 | Beat Hefti | Switzerland | 1999 | 2016 | 6 | 5 | 5 | 16 | B/P |
| 9 | **Thorsten Margis** | Germany | 2014 | 2026 | 5 | 5 | 1 | 11 | B |
| 10 | Peter Utzschneider | West Germany | 1967 | 1976 | 5 | 2 | 3 | 10 | B |
| 10 | Wolfgang Zimmerer | West Germany | 1967 | 1976 | 5 | 2 | 3 | 10 | P |

=== Women's Bobsleigh ===
| Rank | Bobsledder | Country | From | To | Gold | Silver | Bronze | Total | Position |
|---|---|---|---|---|---|---|---|---|---|
| 1 | Sandra Kiriasis | Germany | 2005 | 2014 | **6** | 3 | 1 | 10 | P |
| 2 | **Laura Nolte** | Germany | 2021 | 2026 | **6** | 2 | **3** | **11** | P |
| 3 | Cathleen Martini | Germany | 2004 | 2015 | 4 | **4** | 1 | 9 | P |
| 4 | Annika Drazek | Germany | 2016 | 2019 | 4 | – | – | 4 | B |
| 5 | Anja Schneiderheinze-Stöckel | Germany | 2005 | 2016 | 3 | 3 | – | 6 | B/P |
| 6 | Mariama Jamanka | Germany | 2017 | 2022 | 3 | 2 | 1 | 6 | P |
| 7 | Berit Wiacker | Germany | 2008 | 2011 | 3 | – | – | 3 | B |
| 8 | Janine Tischer | Germany | 2005 | 2012 | 2 | 3 | – | 5 | B |
| 9 | **Melanie Hasler** | Switzerland | 2023 | 2026 | 2 | 2 | 1 | 5 | P |
| 10 | **Lisa Buckwitz** | Germany | 2016 | 2025 | 2 | 1 | **3** | 6 | B/P |

=== Men's Skeleton ===
| Rank | Racer | Country | From | To | Gold | Silver | Bronze | Total |
|---|---|---|---|---|---|---|---|---|
| 1 | Martins Dukurs | Latvia | 2010 | 2022 | **12** | 1 | – | **13** |
| 2 | Kristan Bromley | Great Britain | 2004 | 2009 | 3 | 1 | – | 4 |
| 3 | Nico Baracchi | Switzerland | 1983 | 1986 | 3 | – | 1 | 4 |
| 4 | **Aleksandr Tretyakov** | Russia | 2007 | 2021 | 2 | 2 | **4** | 8 |
| 5 | Gert Elsässer | Austria | 1981 | 1983 | 2 | 1 | – | 3 |
| 5 | **Matt Weston** | Great Britain | 2023 | 2026 | 2 | 1 | – | 3 |
| 7 | Alain Wicki | Switzerland | 1983 | 1988 | 2 | – | 1 | 3 |
| 8 | Tomass Dukurs | Latvia | 2007 | 2020 | 1 | **4** | 3 | 8 |
| 9 | Andi Schmid | Austria | 1984 | 1988 | 1 | **4** | – | 5 |
| 10 | Frank Rommel | Germany | 2006 | 2014 | 1 | 2 | 1 | 4 |
| 10 | Gregor Stähli | Switzerland | 2003 | 2009 | 1 | 2 | 1 | 4 |

=== Women's Skeleton ===
| Rank | Racer | Country | From | To | Gold | Silver | Bronze | Total |
|---|---|---|---|---|---|---|---|---|
| 1 | **Janine Flock** | Austria | 2013 | 2025 | **4** | **4** | **4** | **12** |
| 2 | Anja Huber | Germany | 2007 | 2014 | **4** | 1 | 1 | 6 |
| 3 | Elena Nikitina | Russia | 2013 | 2021 | **4** | 1 | – | 5 |
| 4 | Shelley Rudman | Great Britain | 2006 | 2014 | 2 | 2 | 2 | 6 |
| 5 | **Kim Meylemans** | Belgium | 2024 | 2026 | 2 | – | – | 2 |
| 6 | Tina Hermann | Germany | 2016 | 2023 | 1 | 2 | 1 | 4 |
| 6 | Maya Pedersen | Switzerland | 2005 | 2009 | 1 | 2 | 1 | 4 |
| 6 | Kerstin Szymkowiak (Jürgens) | Germany | 2004 | 2010 | 1 | 2 | 1 | 4 |
| 9 | **Jacqueline Pfeifer (Lölling)** | Germany | 2017 | 2026 | 1 | 1 | 2 | 4 |
| 10 | Diane Sartor | Germany | 2003 | 2005 | 1 | 1 | 1 | 3 |
