= Bobsleigh at the 1984 Winter Olympics =

Bobsleigh at the XIV Olympic Winter Games
- Bobsleigh
- Venue: Sarajevo Olympic Bobsleigh and Luge Track
- Dates: 10–18 February 1984
- Competitors: 111 from 16 nations

Bobsleigh at the 1984 Winter Olympics was held at the Olympic Bobsleigh and Luge Track on the mountain of Trebević between February 10–18, 1984.

This was the first time that Yugoslavia entered bobsleigh teams, and did so as hosts. Chinese Taipei also entered bob teams for the first time. The two events also saw the Swede, Carl-Erik Eriksson compete in the Games for the sixth time and the age of 53.

The German Democratic Republic dominated events and won Gold & Silver in both disciplines, with Wolfgang Hoppe and Dietmar Schauerhammer winning Golds in both events.

== Events ==
Event	Gold		Silver		Bronze	
Two-man	East Germany (GDR-2); Wolfgang Hoppe; Dietmar Schauerhammer	3:25.56	East Germany (GDR-1); Bernhard Lehmann; Bogdan Musioł	3:26.04	Soviet Union (URS-2); Zintis Ekmanis; Vladimir Aleksandrov	3:26.16
Four-man	East Germany (GDR-1); Wolfgang Hoppe; Roland Wetzig; Dietmar Schauerhammer; Andreas Kirchner	3:20.22	East Germany (GDR-2); Bernhard Lehmann; Bogdan Musioł; Ingo Voge; Eberhard Weise	3:20.78	Switzerland (SUI-1); Silvio Giobellina; Heinz Stettler; Urs Salzmann; Rico Freiermuth	3:21.39

== Participating NOCs ==
Sixteen nations sent bobsleigh to compete in the events at Sarajevo.

- Austria
- Canada
- Chinese Taipei
- East Germany
- France
- Great Britain
- Italy
- Japan
- Netherlands
- Romania
- Soviet Union
- Sweden
- Switzerland
- United States
- West Germany
- Yugoslavia

== Medal table ==
Rank	Nation	Gold	Silver	Bronze	Total
1	East Germany	2	2	0	4
2	Soviet Union	0	0	1	1
2	Switzerland	0	0	1	1
Totals (3 entries)		2	2	2	6
