= Romania at the 1972 Winter Olympics =

- IOC code: ROU (ROM used at these Games)
- NOC: Romanian Olympic and Sports Committee
- Website: www.cosr.ro (in Romanian, English, and French)

in Sapporo
- Competitors: 13 (men) in 4 sports
- Flag bearer: Ion Panțuru
- Medals: Gold 0 Silver 0 Bronze 0 Total 0

Winter Olympics appearances (overview)
- 1928; 1932; 1936; 1948; 1952; 1956; 1960; 1964; 1968; 1972; 1976; 1980; 1984; 1988; 1992; 1994; 1998; 2002; 2006; 2010; 2014; 2018; 2022; 2026

Romania competed at the 1972 Winter Olympics in Sapporo, Japan.

== Alpine skiing ==
Men

Athlete	Event	Race 1		Race 2		Total	
Athlete	Event	Time	Rank	Time	Rank	Time	Rank
Virgil Brenci	Downhill					2:04.33	48
Dan Cristea	Downhill					2:01.26	39
Virgil Brenci	Giant Slalom	1:42.81	40	1:44.59	29	3:27.40	33
Dan Cristea	Giant Slalom	1:37.93	30	1:41.95	23	3:19.88	26

Men's slalom

Athlete	Classification		Final					
Athlete	Time	Rank	Time 1	Rank	Time 2	Rank	Total	Rank
Virgil Brenci	1:46.46	4	1:01.56	30	1:00.02	22	2:01.58	20
Dan Cristea	DSQ	–	?	23	DNF	–	DNF	–

== Biathlon ==
Men

Event	Athlete	Time	Penalties	Adjusted time ^{1}	Rank
20 km	Constantin Carabela	1'22:45.95	11	1'33:45.95	52
20 km	Nicolae Veştea	1'21:08.21	6	1'27:08.21	34
20 km	Vilmoş Gheorghe	1'17:52.27	8	1'25:52.27	32
20 km	Victor Fontana	1'19:17.85	5	1'24:17.85	28

^{1} One minute added per close miss (a hit in the outer ring), two minutes added per complete miss.

Men's 4 x 7.5 km relay

Athletes	Race		
Athletes	Misses ^{2}	Time	Rank
Nicolae Veştea; Victor Fontana; Ion Teposu; Vilmoş Gheorghe	5	1'59:30.61	9

^{2} A penalty loop of 200 metres had to be skied per missed target.

== Bobsleigh ==
Sled	Athletes	Event	Run 1		Run 2		Run 3		Run 4		Total	
Sled	Athletes	Event	Time	Rank	Time	Rank	Time	Rank	Time	Rank	Time	Rank
ROU-1	Ion Panţuru; Ion Zangor	Two-man	1:16.50	7	1:15.31	2	1:14.04	3	1:14.68	9	5:00.53	5
ROU-2	Dragoș Panaitescu-Rapan; Dumitru Focşeneanu	Two-man	1:17.98	14	1:17.00	13	1:14.67	11	1:15.24	13	5:04.89	12

Sled	Athletes	Event	Run 1		Run 2		Run 3		Run 4		Total	
Sled	Athletes	Event	Time	Rank	Time	Rank	Time	Rank	Time	Rank	Time	Rank
ROU-1	Ion Panţuru; Ion Zangor; Dumitru Pascu; Dumitru Focşeneanu	Four-man	1:12.07	11	1:12.65	14	1:11.08	7	1:11.32	7	4:47.12	10

== Figure skating ==
Men

Athlete	CF	FS	Points	Places	Rank
Gheorghe Fazekas	17	17	2094.0	153	17
