= FIBT World Championships 1998 =

Bobsleigh and skeleton competition

1998 World Championships
- Location: St. Moritz, Switzerland

The FIBT World Championships 1998 took place in St. Moritz, Switzerland for the record nineteenth time. The Swiss city had hosted the event previously in 1931 (Four-man), 1935 (Four-man), 1937 (Four-man), 1938 (Two-man), 1939 (Two-man), 1947, 1955, 1957, 1959, 1965, 1970, 1974, 1977, 1982, 1987, 1989 (Skeleton), 1990 (Bobsleigh), and 1997 (Bobsleigh). This championship event was an extraordinary event since skeleton was not included in the program at the 1998 Winter Olympics in Nagano, Japan.

== Men's skeleton ==
Pos	Athlete	Time
Gold	Willi Schneider (GER)	
Silver	Alain Wicki (SUI)	
Bronze	Felix Poletti (SUI)	

== Medal table ==
Rank	Nation	Gold	Silver	Bronze	Total
1	Germany (GER)	1	0	0	1
2	Switzerland (SUI)	0	1	1	2
Totals (2 entries)		1	1	1	3
