= Frank Jacob =

Frank Jacob may refer to:

- Frank Jacob (historian) (born 1984), German historian and Japanologist
- Frank Jacob (bobsleigh), German bobsledder and bobsleigh coach

== See also ==
- Frank Jacobs (1929–2021), American author
