= Wetzig =

Wetzig is a German surname. Notable people with the surname include:

- Roland Wetzig (born 1959), East German bobsledder
- Ute Wetzig (born 1971), German diver
