= Dirk Wiese =

Dirk Wiese may refer to:

- Dirk Wiese (bobsleigh), German bobsledder
- Dirk Wiese (politician) (born 1983), German politician
