= Erec Bruckert =

German bobsledder (born 1997)

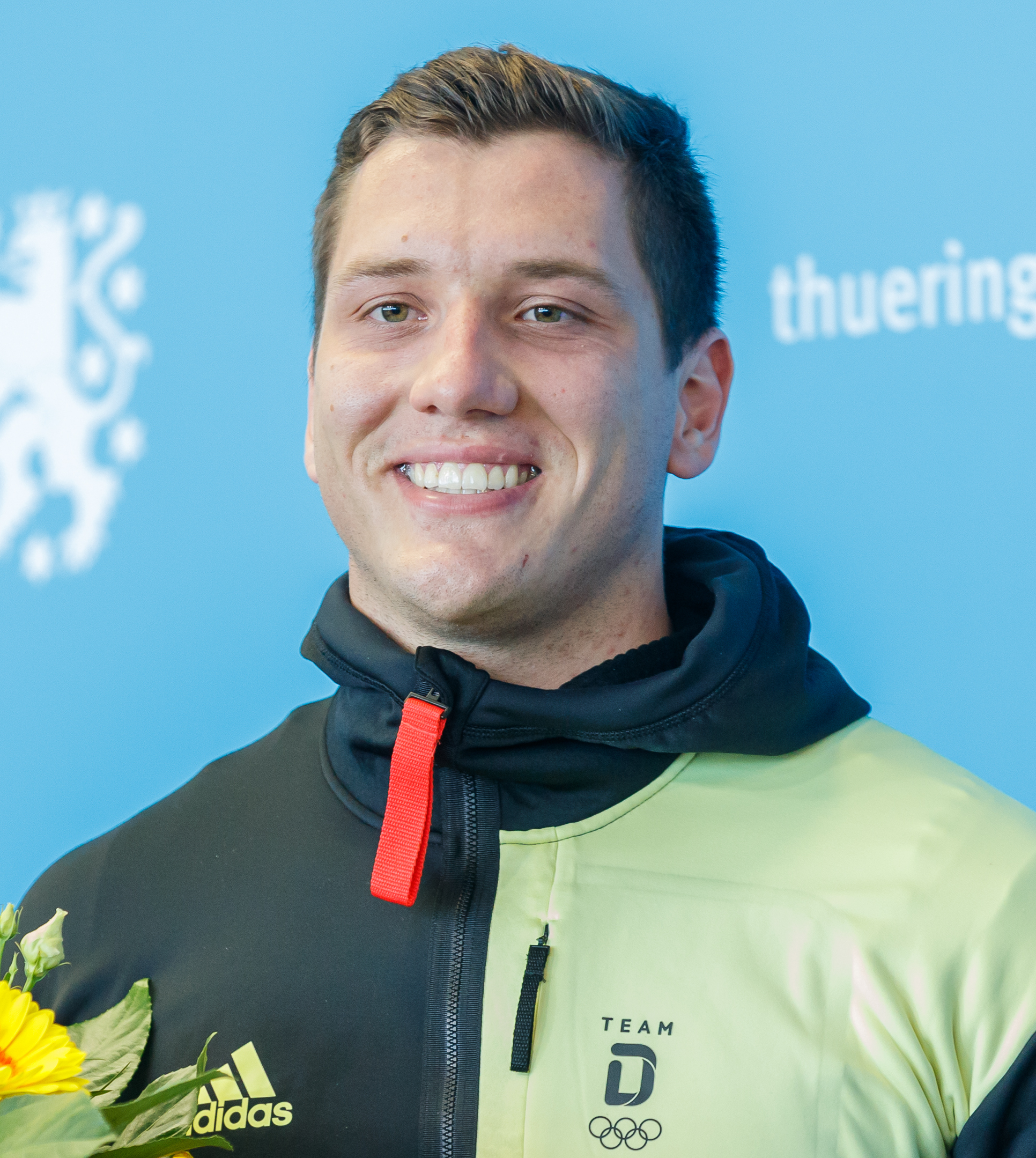
- Bruckert in 2022

Personal information
- Full name: Erec Maximilian Bruckert
- Born: 28 February 1997 (age 29)
- Height: 1.89 m (6 ft 2 in)
- Weight: 105 kg (231 lb)

Sport
- Country: Germany
- Sport: Bobsleigh
- Event(s): Two-man, four-man
- Coached by: René Spies
Medal record
Men's bobsleigh
Representing Germany
World Championships
Silver medal – second place	2024 Winterberg	Four-man
European Championships
Gold medal – first place	2023 Altenberg	Two-man
Silver medal – second place	2024 Igls	Four-man
Bronze medal – third place	2024 Sigulda	Two-man

Erec Maximilian Bruckert (born 28 February 1997) is a German bobsledder.

== Career ==
In January 2023, Bruckert competed at the IBSF European Championships 2023 and won a gold medal in the two-man event, along with Johannes Lochner, with a time of 1:51.50. He again competed at the IBSF European Championships 2024 and won a silver medal in the four-man event, and a bronze medal in the two-man event.

In March 2024, he represented Germany at the IBSF World Championships 2024 and won a silver medal in the four-man event.

== World Championships results ==
Event	Four-man
(Switzerland) 2023 St. Moritz	4th
(Germany) 2024 Winterberg	2nd
