= Walter Stern =

Walter Stern may refer to:

- Walter Stern (art critic) (1896–1970), German art critic and broadcaster
- Walter Stern (1924–2022), Austrian Gewerkschafter
- Walter Stern (director) (born 1965), English music video film director
- Walter Stern (skeleton racer) (born 1972), Austrian skeleton racer
