= FIBT World Championships 1997 =

Bobsleigh and skeleton competition

1997 World Championships
- Location: St. Moritz, Switzerland; Lake Placid, New York

The FIBT World Championships 1997 took place in St. Moritz, Switzerland (Bobsleigh) and Lake Placid, New York, United States (Skeleton). St. Moritz hosted a championship event for the record eighteenth time. The Swiss city had hosted the event previously in 1931 (Four-man), 1935 (Four-man), 1937 (Four-man), 1938 (Two-man), 1939 (Two-man), 1947, 1955, 1957, 1959, 1965, 1970, 1974, 1977, 1982, 1987, 1989 (Skeleton), and 1990 (Bobsleigh). Meanwhile, Lake Placid hosted a championship event for the seventh time, having previously done so in 1949, 1961, 1969, 1973, 1978, and 1983.

== Two man bobsleigh ==
Pos	Team	Time
Gold	Switzerland (Reto Götschi, Guido Acklin)	
Silver	Italy (Günther Huber, Antonio Tartaglia)	
Bronze	United States (Brian Shimer, Robert Olesen)	

Italy earned its first world championships medal since 1971.

== Four man bobsleigh ==
Pos	Team	Time
Gold	Germany (Wolfgang Hoppe, Sven Rühr, René Hannemann, Carsten Embach)	
Silver	Germany (Dirk Wiese, Christoph Bartsch, Thorsten Voss, Michael Liekmeier)	
Bronze	United States (Brian Shimer, Chip Minton, Randy Jones, Robert Olesen)	

== Men's skeleton ==
Pos	Athlete	Time
Gold	Ryan Davenport (CAN)	
Silver	Jim Shea (USA)	
Bronze	Chris Soule (USA)	

== Medal table ==
Rank	Nation	Gold	Silver	Bronze	Total
1	Germany (GER)	1	1	0	2
2	Canada (CAN)	1	0	0	1
2	Switzerland (SUI)	1	0	0	1
4	United States (USA)	0	1	3	4
5	Italy (ITA)	0	1	0	1
Totals (5 entries)		3	3	3	9
