= Veștea =

Veștea is a Romanian surname. Notable people with the surname include:

- Adrian Veștea (born 1973), Romanian politician
- Nicolae Veștea (born 1950), Romanian biathlete
