= Maximilian Arndt =

German bobsledder (born 1987)

Personal information
- Born: 23 July 1987 (age 38) Suhl, East Germany
- Height: 1.80 m (5 ft 11 in)
- Weight: 93 kg (205 lb)

Sport
- Country: Germany
- Sport: Bobsleigh (pilot)
- Club: BSR Rennsteig Oberhof
- Turned pro: 2003
- Coached by: Matthias Trübner; Christoph Langen
- Retired: 2016
Medal record
Men's Bobsleigh
Representing Germany
World Championships
Gold medal – first place	2013 St. Moritz	Four-man
Gold medal – first place	2015 Winterberg	Four-man
Silver medal – second place	2012 Lake Placid	Four-man
Silver medal – second place	2012 Lake Placid	Mixed team
Bronze medal – third place	2012 Lake Placid	Two-man
European Championships
Gold medal – first place	Altenberg 2012	Four-man
Gold medal – first place	Igls 2013	Four-man
Silver medal – second place	Altenberg 2012	Two-man

Maximilian Arndt (born 23 July 1987) is a former German bobsledder who has competed since 2003. He originally competed in luge before a coach suggested that he try bobsleigh. He won four-man and two-man golds at the 2011 World Junior Championships at Park City. As of February 2014 he has scored seven wins in the Bobsleigh World Cup: five in four-man, one in two-man and one in team competition.
