= Bodo Ferl =

East German bobsledder

Medal record

Men's Bobsleigh

Representing East Germany

World Championships
Silver medal – second place	1985 Cervinia	Four-man
Bronze medal – third place	1989 Cortina d'Ampezzo	Four-man

Bodo Ferl (born 20 January 1963) is an East German bobsledder who competed from the mid to late 1980s. He won two medals in the four-man event at the FIBT World Championships with a silver in 1985 and a bronze in 1989.

Ferl also finished eighth in the four-man event at the 1988 Winter Olympics in Calgary.
