= Felix Poletti =

Swiss skeleton racer

Medal record

Skeleton

World Championships
Bronze medal – third place	1998 St. Moritz	Men

Felix Poletti (born 23 July 1965) is a Swiss skeleton racer who has competed since 1995. He won a bronze medal in the men's skeleton event at the 1998 FIBT World Championships in St. Moritz.

Poletti finished 16th in the men's skeleton event at the 2002 Winter Olympics in Salt Lake City.
