= Robert Olesen =

American bobsledder

Medal record

Bobsleigh

World Championships
Bronze medal – third place	1997 St. Moritz	Two-man
Bronze medal – third place	1997 St. Moritz	Four-man

Robert Olesen (11 June 1967) is an American bobsledder who competed in the late 1990s. At the 1997 FIBT World Championships in St. Moritz, he won bronze medals in both the two-man and the four-man events.

At the 1998 Winter Olympics in Nagano, Olesen finished seventh in the two-man event and 12th in the four-man event.

Olesen is currently the Head Men's and Women's Track and Field and Cross Country coach at University of North Carolina Charlotte.
