= Günter Neuburger =

German bobsledder

Medal record

Bobsleigh

World Championships
Silver medal – second place	1983 Lake Placid	Four-man

Günter Neuburger (born 20 May 1954) is a West German bobsledder who competed in the early 1980s. He won a silver medal in the four-man event at the 1983 FIBT World Championships in Lake Placid, New York.

Neuberger also finished ninth in the four-man event at the 1984 Winter Olympics in Sarajevo.
