= Nikolay Zhirov =

Soviet bobsledder

Medal record

Bobsleigh

World Championships
Bronze medal – third place	1985 Cervinia	Two-man

Nikolay Zhirov (sometimes shown as Nikolai Schirov) is a Soviet bobsledder who competed in the mid-1980s. He won a bronze medal in the two-man event at the 1985 FIBT World Championships in Cervinia, Italy.
