= Petre Hristovici =

Romanian bobsledder

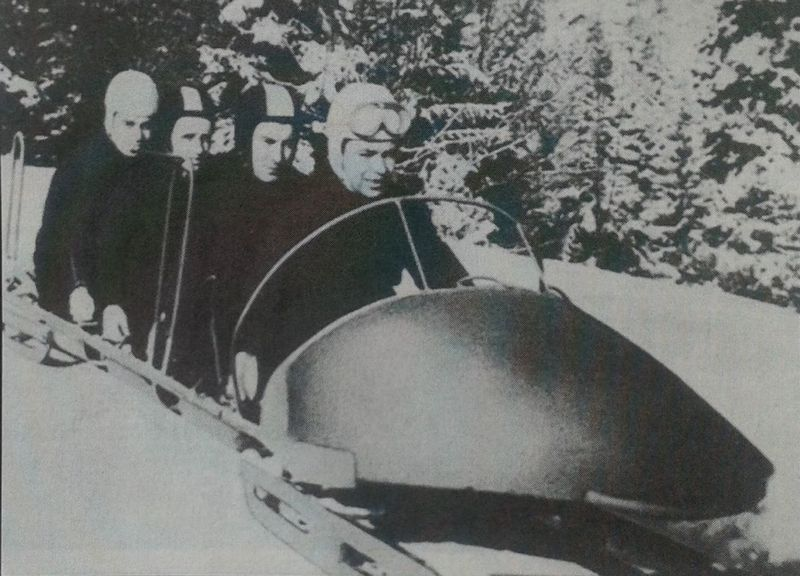
- CE 1967 - Four-person bobsleigh crew, European champion, Ion Panțuru, Nicolae Neagoe, Petre Hristovici, Gheorghe Maftei

Personal information
- Nationality: Romanian
- Born: 22 May 1938 (age 88) Bucharest, Romania
- Height: 184 cm (6 ft 0 in)
- Weight: 88 kg (194 lb)

Sport
- Sport: Bobsleigh
Medal record
Men's bobsleigh
Representing Romania
European Championships
Gold medal – first place	1967 Igls	Four-man
Silver medal – second place	1968 St. Moritz	Four-man

Petre Hristovici (born 22 May 1938) is a Romanian bobsledder. He competed in the four-man event at the 1968 Winter Olympics.
