= FIBT World Championships 1985 =

Winter sport championship held in 1985

1985 World Championships
- Location: Cervinia, Italy

The FIBT World Championships 1985 took place in Cervinia, Italy for the third time, having hosted the event previously in 1971 and 1975. Except for competitions in St. Moritz, Switzerland and Cortina d'Ampezzo, Italy, it would be the last time a championship would be hosted on a naturally refrigerated track with all other competitions taking place on artificially refrigerated ones.

== Two man bobsleigh ==
Pos	Team	Time
Gold	East Germany (Wolfgang Hoppe, Dietmar Schauerhammer)	
Silver	East Germany (Detlef Richter, Steffen Grummt)	
Bronze	Soviet Union (Sintis Ekmanis, Nikolay Zhirov)	

The Soviets earned their first medal at these championships.

== Four man bobsleigh ==
Pos	Team	Time
Gold	East Germany (Bernhard Lehmann, Matthias Trübner, Ingo Voge, Steffen Grummt)	
Silver	East Germany (Detlef Richter, Dietmar Jerke, Bodo Ferl, Matthias Legler)	
Bronze	Switzerland (Silvio Giobellina, Heinz Stettler, Urs Salzmann, Rico Freiermuth)	

== Medal table ==
Rank	Nation	Gold	Silver	Bronze	Total
1	East Germany (GDR)	2	2	0	4
2	Soviet Union (URS)	0	0	1	1
2	Switzerland (SUI)	0	0	1	1
Totals (3 entries)		2	2	2	6
