= Hans-Joachim Schumacher =

West German bobsledder

Medal record

Bobsleigh

World Championships
| Silver medal – second place | 1983 Lake Placid | Four-man |

Hans-Joachim "Hajo" Schuhmacher (born 20 November 1946) is a West German bobsledder who competed in the early 1980s. He won a silver medal in the four-man event at the 1983 FIBT World Championships in Lake Placid, New York.

Schuhmacher also finished ninth in the four-man event at the 1984 Winter Olympics in Sarajevo.
