= Klaus Kopp =

German bobsledder

Medal record

Bobsleigh

World Championships
| Silver medal – second place | 1983 Lake Placid | Four-man |

Klaus Kopp (born 22 June 1950) was a West German bobsledder who competed in the early 1980s. He won a silver medal in the four-man event at the 1983 FIBT World Championships which was hosted in the area of Lake Placid, New York.

Kopp also finished ninth in the four-man event at the 1984 Winter Olympics in Sarajevo.
