= Matthias Trübner =

East German bobsledder

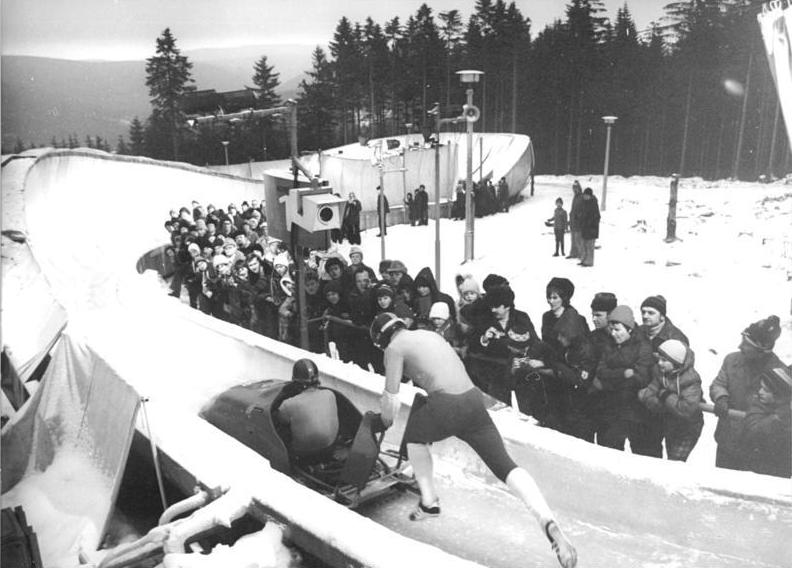
- Matthias Trübner (in the foreground, on the right) with his teammate Bernhard Lehmann (in the foreground, in the bobsled) in 1977)

Medal record

Men's Bobsleigh

Representing East Germany

World Championships
Gold medal – first place	1985 Cervinia	Four-man

Matthias Trübner is an East German bobsledder who competed in the mid-1980s. He won a gold medal in the four-man event at the 1985 FIBT World Championships in Cervinia.

Trübner became a bobsleigh coach in his home state of Thuringia in East Germany (now Germany) after he retired from the sport. One of his star pupils was André Lange. He has also coached bobsleigh driver Maximilian Arndt.
