= Guido Acklin =

Swiss bobsledder (born 1969)

Personal information
- Born: 21 November 1969 (age 56)
- Children: Lucia Acklin
- Relative: Donat Acklin (brother)

Sport
- Sport: Bobsleigh
- Club: BC Celerina
- Retired: 1999 (1st); 2002 (2nd)
Medal record
Bobsleigh
Representing Switzerland
Olympic Games
| Silver medal – second place | 1994 Lillehammer | Two-man |
World Championships
| Gold medal – first place | 1997 St. Moritz | Two-man |
| Bronze medal – third place | 1996 Calgary | Two-man |

Guido Acklin (born 21 November 1969) is a Swiss bobsledder who competed in the 1990s. He won a silver medal at the 1994 Winter Olympics in Lillehammer.

== Career ==
Acklin competed for Switzerland at the 1994 Winter Olympics in Lillehammer, he won a silver medal in the two-man event with his teammate Reto Götschi. His brother Donat Acklin, won the gold medal in the same event. Guido and Götschi finished third at the FIBT World Championships 1996, but then earned gold in the event the following year in St Moritz.

Approaching the 1998 Winter Olympics as reigning world champions, Acklin and Götschi were considered favourites for gold in the two-man bobsled but ultimately finished sixth. Acklin was the Swiss flag bearer at the opening ceremony in Nagano. However, at the European Bobsleigh Championships of the same year, the pair won gold - a feat they would repeat again in 1999. This added two gold medals to their silver of 1996, and bronze of 1995 and 1997. Acklin also picked up a further gold medal in the 1997 four-man European Championship race.

Acklin retired in 1999, however was convinced to return for the 2002 Winter Olympics in Salt Lake City. He switched focus to the four man discipline, finishing sixth alongside Urs Aeberhard, Steve Anderhub, and Christian Reich. He would retire from competition permanently a short time after.

== Personal life ==
Acklin's daughter Lucia Acklin is a heptathlete. His son, Curdin, is a volleyball player.

Acklin now works as Head of Production for EAO AG.
