= Nicolae Neagoe =

Romanian bobsledder (1941–2023)

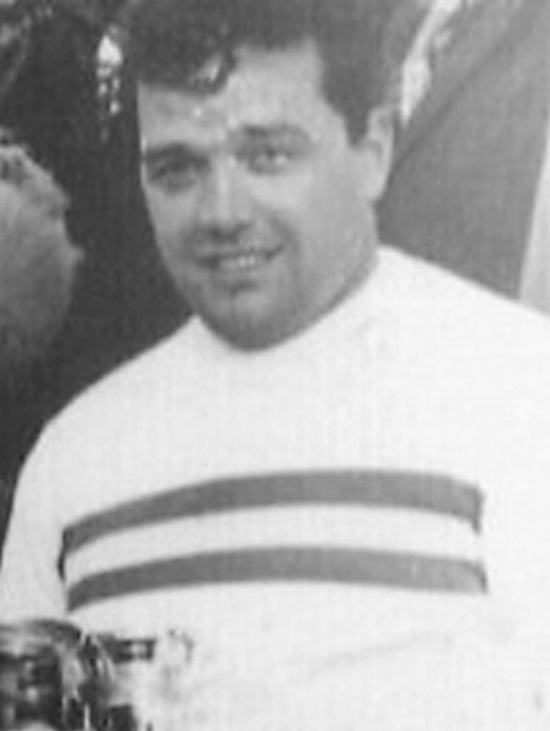
- Neagoe in 1960

Personal information
- Born: 2 August 1941 Sinaia, Romania
- Died: 29 April 2023 (aged 81)
- Height: 177 cm (5 ft 10 in)
- Weight: 92 kg (203 lb)
Medal record
Men's bobsleigh
Representing Romania
Olympic Games
Bronze medal – third place	1968 Grenoble	Two-man
European Championships
Gold medal – first place	1967 Igls	Four-man
Silver medal – second place	1968 St. Moritz	Four-man
Bronze medal – third place	1970 Cortina d'Ampezzo	Four-man

Nicolae Neagoe (2 August 1941 – 29 April 2023) was a Romanian bobsledder who competed in the late 1960s and early 1970s.

Neagoe was born in Sinaia on 2 August 1941. With his driver Ion Panţuru, he won the bronze medal in the two-man event at the 1968 Winter Olympics in Grenoble. As of the 2022 Winter Olympics, this is Romania's only medal at the Winter Olympics.

Nicolae Neagoe died on 29 April 2023, at the age of 81.
