= Horst Floth =

West German bobsledder

Medal record

Men's bobsleigh

Representing West Germany

Olympic Games
Silver medal – second place	1968 Grenoble	Two-man
Silver medal – second place	1972 Sapporo	Two-man

World Championships
Gold medal – first place	1970 St. Moritz	Two-man

European Championships
Silver medal – second place	1970 Cortina d'Ampezzo	Two-man

Horst Floth (24 July 1934 in Karlsbad – 5 October 2005 in Feldafing) was a West German bobsledder who competed in the late 1960s and early 1970s. Competing in two Winter Olympics, he won silver medals in the two-man event both in 1968 and 1972.

Floth also won a gold medal in the two-man event at the 1970 FIBT World Championships in St. Moritz.

A hotelier when he was not in bobsleigh, Floth died from cancer in 2005.
