= Antonio Tartaglia =

Italian bobsledder (born 1968)

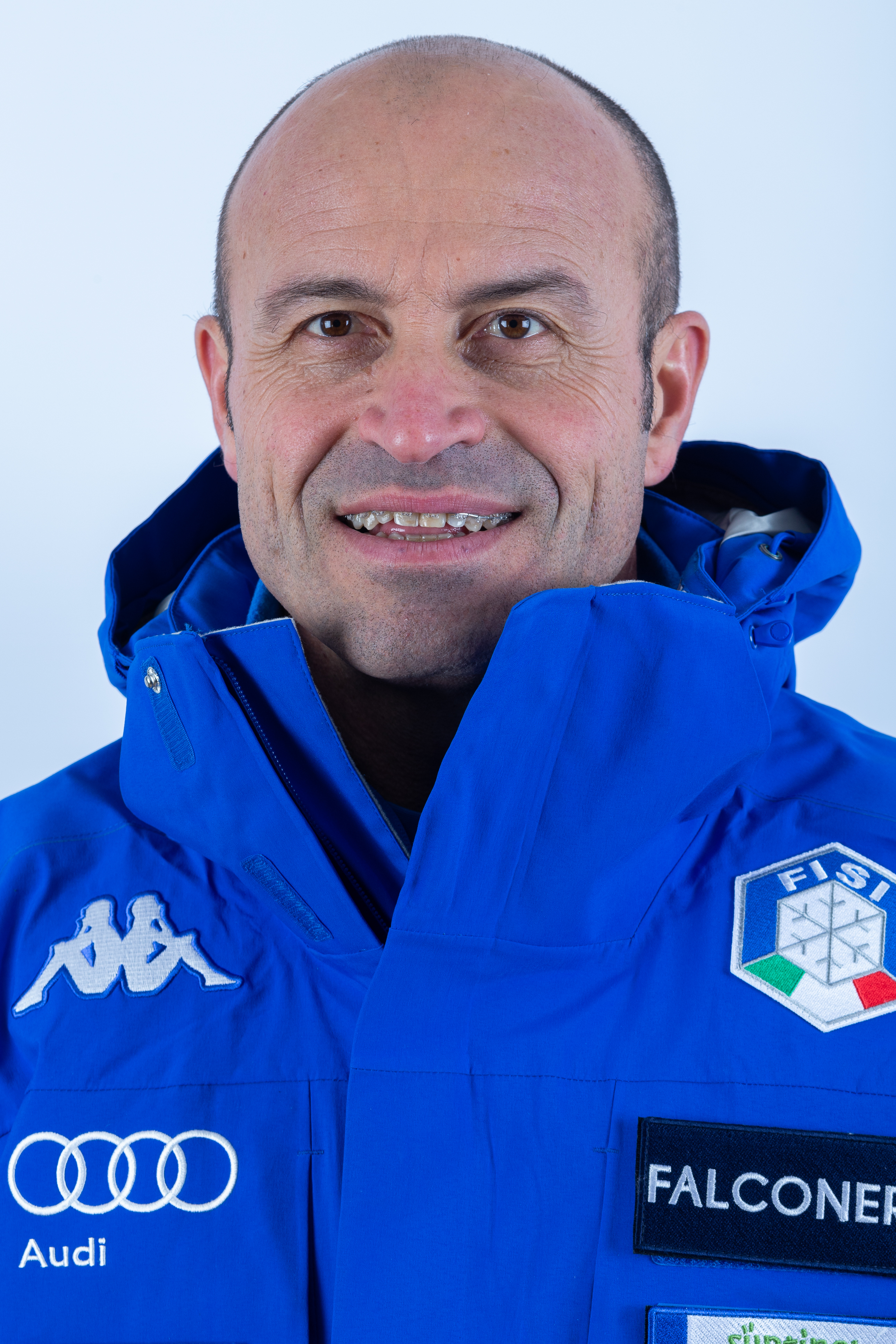
- Tartaglia in 2018

Medal record

Bobsleigh

Olympic Games
Gold medal – first place	1998 Nagano	Two-man

World Championships
Silver medal – second place	1997 St. Moritz	Two-man

Antonio Tartaglia (born 13 January 1968 in Casalbordino) is an Italian bobsledder who competed in the 1990s. He came to the sport from athletics, having focused on the shot put and discus. He took up bobsledding after joining the Carabinieri, and represented Centro Sportivo Carabinieri.

Together with teammate Günther Huber he won a gold medal in the two-man event at the 1998 Winter Olympics in Nagano, shared with Canada's Pierre Lueders and David MacEachern. He was the first person from Abruzzo to win a Winter Olympic gold.

Tartaglia also won a silver medal in the two-man event at the 1997 FIBT World Championships in St. Moritz. At the European Championships, Tartaglia took three medals, including golds in the four-man in 1994 and in the two-man in 1997. He also won seven Italian national championships, taking five two-man titles between 1992 and 2000 and both the two-man and four-man titles in 2001.

After retiring from competition, Tartaglia worked as a technician and fitness coach for the Italian bobsleigh team.
