= Dumitru Focșeneanu =

Romanian bobsledder (1935–2019)

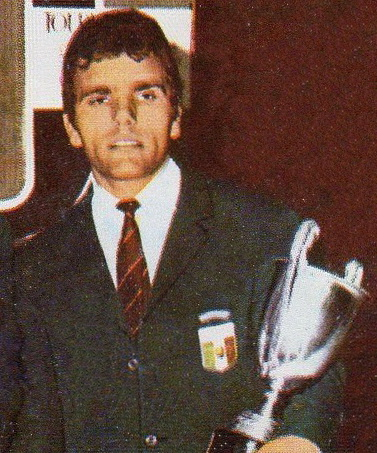
- Panțuru and Focșeneanu (right) (1973)

Personal information
- Born: 8 November 1935 Breaza, Romania
- Died: 20 June 2019 (aged 83) Ploiești, Romania
- Height: 175 cm (5 ft 9 in)
- Weight: 72 kg (159 lb)

Sport
- Sport: Bobsleigh
Medal record
Men's bobsleigh
Representing Romania
World Championships
Silver medal – second place	1969 Lake Placid	Two-man
Bronze medal – third place	1973 Lake Placid	Two-man
European Championships
Silver medal – second place	1969 Cervinia	Two-man

Dumitru Focșneanu (8 November 1935 – 20 June 2019) was a Romanian bobsledder who had his best results as a brakeman with Ion Panțuru. Together they won two medals in the two-man event at the FIBT World Championships with a silver in 1969 and a bronze in 1973.

Focșneanu competed in two-man and four-man events at the 1972 Winter Olympics and placed 10th–12th.
