= Michael Liekmeier =

German bobsledder

Medal record

Men's Bobsleigh

Representing Germany

World Championships
Silver medal – second place	1997 St. Moritz	Four-man

Michael Liekmeier (born 22 July 1970) is a German bobsledder who competed in the late 1990s. He won a silver medal in the four-man event at the 1997 FIBT World Championships in St. Moritz.

His achievements in the four-man by Dirk Wiese was the silver medal at the 1997 World Championships in St. Moritz, the bronze medal at the European Championships in 1995 in La Plagne and 1997 at the Königssee and a total of six World Cup wins (twice Altenberg 1993, Calgary in 1994, St. Moritz 1995, Innsbruck in 1996 and La Plagne 1996).
