= Tanja Morel =

Swiss skeleton racer

Tanja Morel (born 14 October 1975) is a Swiss skeleton racer who has competed since 1998. She finished seventh in the women's skeleton event at the 2006 Winter Olympics in Turin.

Zanoletti's best finish at the FIBT World Championships was fourth in the women's skeleton event in 2003, 2004, and 2007.
