= Matthias Benesch =

German bobsledder

Medal record

Men's Bobsleigh

Representing Germany

World Cup Championships
Bronze medal – third place	2000-01	Four-man

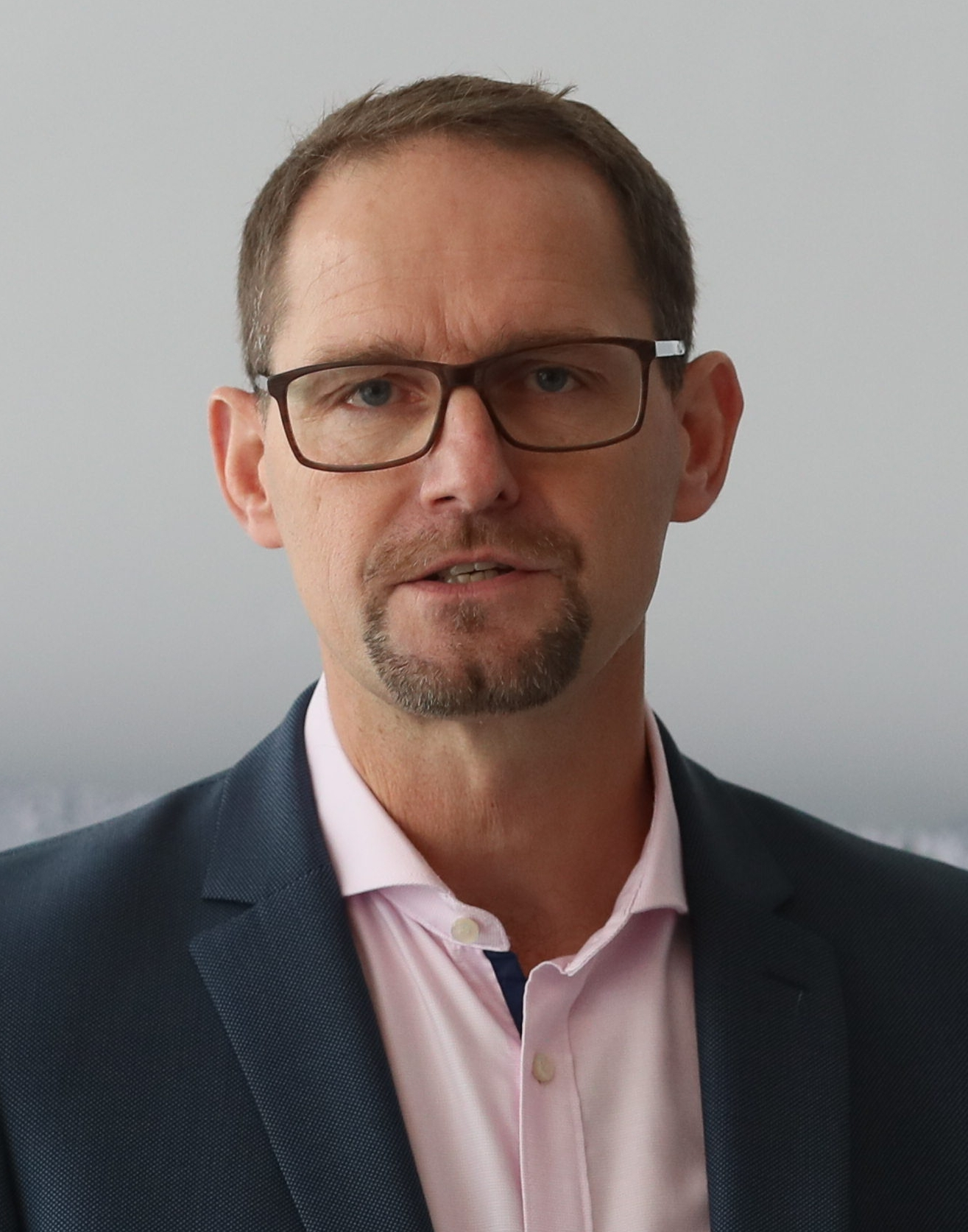
Matthias Benesch (2018)

Matthias Benesch (born 1968) is a German bobsledder who competed in the late 1990s and early 2000s. He is best known for his third-place finish in the four-man event during the 2000-1 Bobsleigh World Cup championships.
