= Victor Fontana (biathlete) =

Romanian biathlete (1948–1989)

Personal information
- Nationality: Romanian
- Born: 8 March 1948; Bușteni, Romania
- Died: 24 December 1989 (aged 41); Brașov, Romania

Sport
- Sport: Biathlon

Victor Fontana (8 March 1948 – 24 December 1989) was a Romanian biathlete. He competed at the 1972 Winter Olympics and the 1976 Winter Olympics. Fontana was killed during the Romanian Revolution.
