= Andreas Barucha =

German bobsledder (born 1979)

Personal information
- Born: 2 April 1979 (age 47) Potsdam, Brandenburg, East Germany
- Height: 1.81 m (5 ft 11 in)
- Weight: 93 kg (205 lb; 14.6 st)

Sport
- Country: Germany
- Sport: Bobsleigh
- Turned pro: 2000

Achievements and titles
- Olympic finals: 4th
Medal record
Men´s Bobsleigh
Representing Germany
World Championships
Gold medal – first place	2009 Lake Placid	Mixed team

Andreas Barucha (born 2 April 1979 in Potsdam) is a German bobsledder who has competed since 1999. He won a gold in the mixed team event at the 2009 FIBT World Championships in Lake Placid, New York. His best finish at the FIBT World Championships was seventh in the four-man event at Calgary in 2005.

Barucha's best World Cup finish was second three times in the four-man event (2005, 2006, 2009).

He finished fourth in the four-man event at the 2010 Winter Olympics in Vancouver.
