= Sven Rühr =

German bobsledder

Medal record

Men's Bobsleigh

Representing Germany

World Championships
| Gold medal – first place | 1996 Calgary | Four-man |
| Gold medal – first place | 1997 St. Moritz | Four-man |
| Silver medal – second place | 2000 Altenberg | Four-man |

Sven Rühr is a German bobsledder who competed in the late 1990s and the early 2000s. He won three medals in the four-man event at the FIBT World Championships with two golds (1996, 1997) and one silver (2000).
