= Dumitru Pascu =

Romanian bobsledder

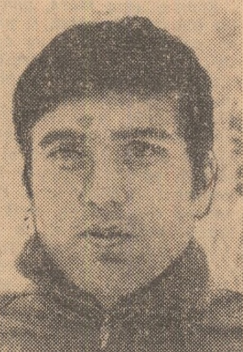
- Dumitru Pascu, c.1971

Personal information
- Born: 25 February 1945 Sinaia, Romania
- Died: 1995 (aged 49–50)

Sport
- Sport: Bobsleigh
Medal record
Men's bobsleigh
Representing Romania
European Championships
Bronze medal – third place	1970 Cortina d'Ampezzo	Four-man

Dumitru Pascu (25 February 1945 – 1995) was a Romanian bobsledder. He competed in the four man event at the 1972 Winter Olympics.
