= Detlef Richter =

East German bobsledder

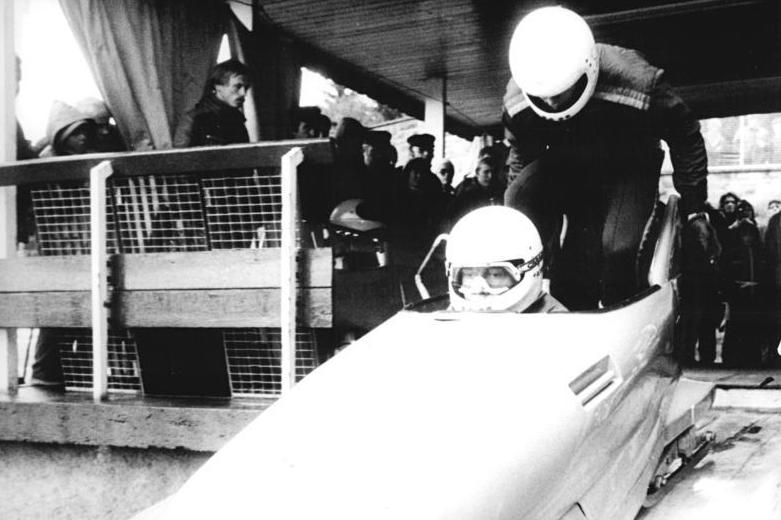
- Richter (in sled wearing goggles) in 1982.
Medal record
Men's bobsleigh
Representing East Germany
Olympic Games
Bronze medal – third place	1980 Lake Placid	Four-man
World Championships
Silver medal – second place	1979 Königssee	Four-man
Silver medal – second place	1985 Cervinia	Two-man
Silver medal – second place	1985 Cervinia	Four-man
Bronze medal – third place	1983 Lake Placid	Four-man
Bronze medal – third place	1986 Königssee	Two-man
World Cup Championships
Silver medal – second place	1988–89	Combined
Silver medal – second place	1988–89	Two-man

Detlef Richter (born 6 June 1956 in Leipzig, Saxony) is an East German bobsledder who competed from the late 1970s to the late 1980s. He won a bronze medal in the four-man event at the 1980 Winter Olympics in Lake Placid.

Richter also won five medals at the FIBT World Championships with three silvers (Two-man: 1985, Four-man: 1979, 1985) and two bronzes (Two-man: 1986, Four-man: 1983).

His best Bobsleigh World Cup finish was second in 1988–89, both in the combined men's and two-man events.
