= Walter Stern (skeleton racer) =

Austrian skeleton racer

Personal information
- Born: 6 February 1972 (age 54) Innsbruck, Austria
Medal record
Men's skeleton
Representing Austria
European Championships
Gold medal – first place	2003 St. Moritz	Individual

Walter Stern (born 6 February 1972 in Innsbruck) is an Austrian male skeleton racer, who took part in the 2005/2006 Skeleton World Cup trying to qualify for the 2006 Winter Olympics. He was Champion of Europe in 2003.

== World Cup 2005/2006 Results ==
- 25th on 10 November 2005, Calgary CAN
- 23rd on 17 November 2005, Lake Placid, New York, USA
