= Donat Ertel =

German bobsledder

Personal information
- Nationality: German
- Born: 22 February 1948; Aschau im Chiemgau, Germany
- Died: 9 September 2022 (aged 74)

Sport
- Sport: Bobsleigh

Donat Ertel (22 February 1948 – 9 September 2022) was a German bobsledder. He competed in the four man event at the 1972 Winter Olympics.
