= Horst Bernhardt =

East German bobsledder

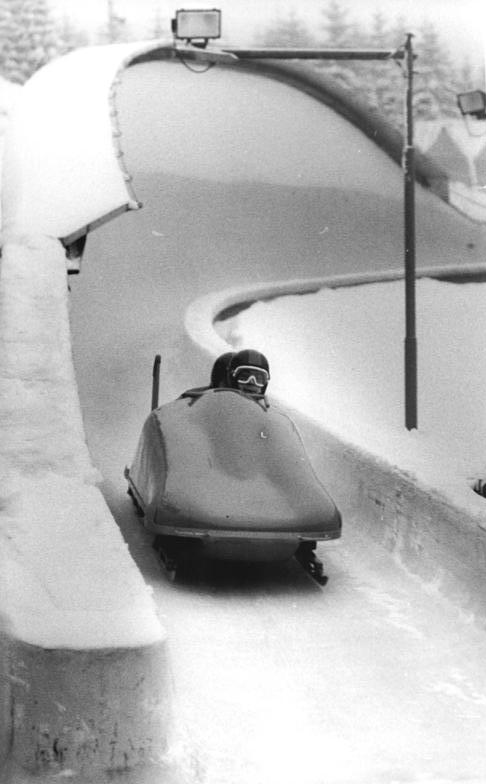
- Bernhardt with Pilot Horst Schönau in December 1974.
Medal record
Men's Bobsleigh
Representing East Germany
World Championships
Gold medal – first place	1978 Lake Placid	Four-man

Horst Bernhardt (born 26 January 1951 in Leipzig, Saxony) is an East German bobsledder who competed in the late 1970s. He won a gold medal in the four-man event at the 1978 FIBT World Championships in Lake Placid.
