= FIBT World Championships 1983 =

Winter sport competition

1983 World Championships
- Location: Lake Placid, New York

The FIBT World Championships 1983 took place in Lake Placid, New York, United States for the sixth time, hosting the event previously in 1949, 1961, 1969, 1973, and 1978.

== Two man bobsleigh ==
Pos	Team	Time
Gold	Switzerland (Ralph Pichler, Urs Leuthold)	
Silver	Switzerland (Erich Schärer, Max Rüegg)	
Bronze	East Germany (Wolfgang Hoppe, Dietmar Schauerhammer)	

== Four man bobsleigh ==
Pos	Team	Time
Gold	Switzerland (Ekkehard Fasser, Hans Märcy, Kurt Poletti, Rolf Strittmatter)	
Silver	West Germany (Klaus Kopp, Gerhard Öchsle, Günther Neuberger, Hans-Joachim Schumacher)	
Bronze	East Germany (Detlef Richter, Henry Gerlach, Thomas Forch, Dietmar Jerke)	

== Medal table ==
Rank	Nation	Gold	Silver	Bronze	Total
1	Switzerland (SUI)	2	1	0	3
2	West Germany (FRG)	0	1	0	1
3	East Germany (GDR)	0	0	2	2
Totals (3 entries)		2	2	2	6
