= Sepp Dostthaler =

German bobsledder (born 1965)

Medal record

Men's Bobsleigh

Representing Germany

World Cup Championships
Bronze medal – third place	1995-96	Two-man

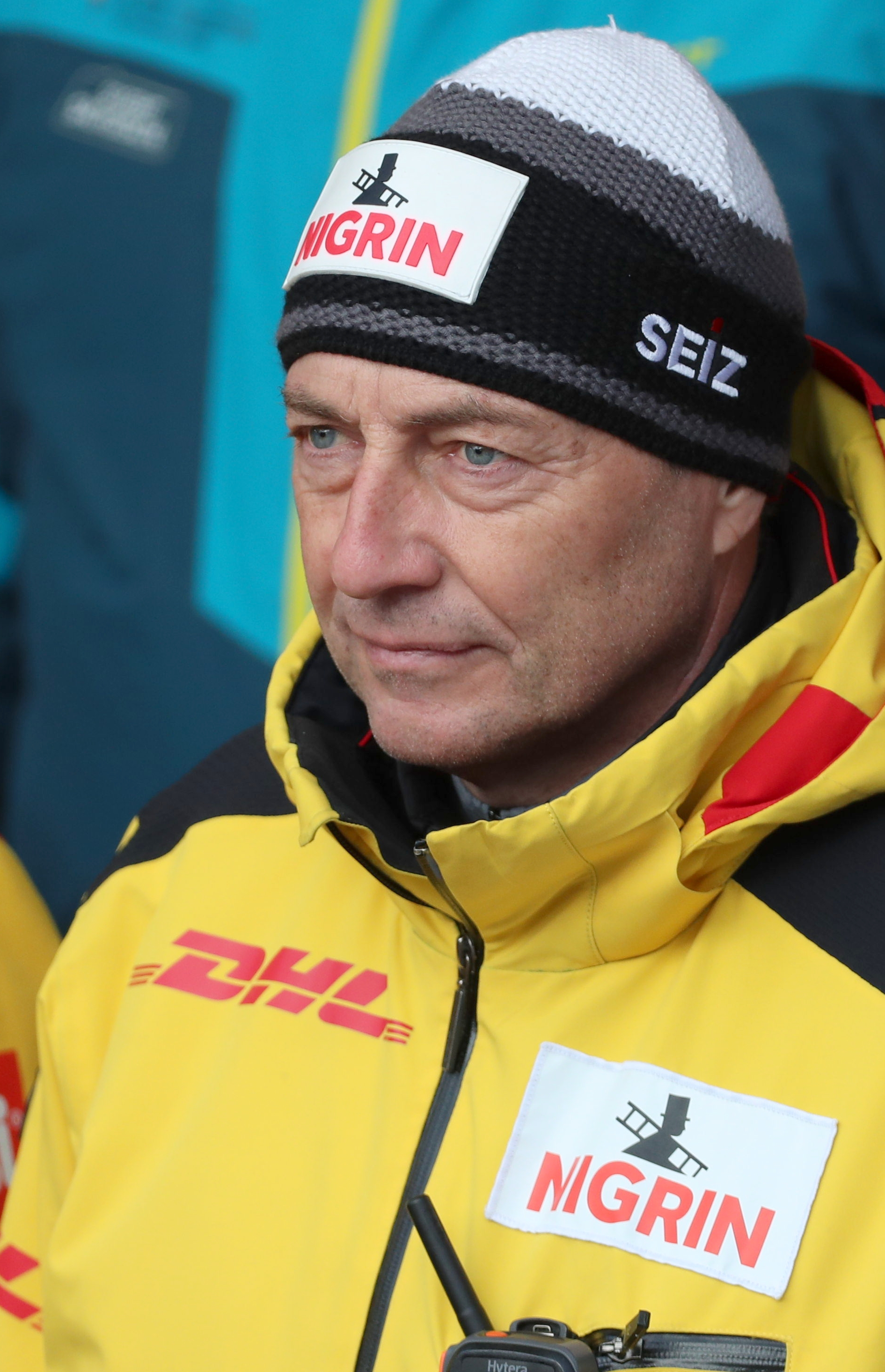
Sepp Dostthaler

Sepp Dostthaler (born 9 January 1965) is a German former bobsledder who competed in the mid-1990s. He is best known for his third-place finish in the 1995-6 Bobsleigh World Cup championships in the two-man event.

Dostthaler also finished 12th in the two-man event at the 1994 Winter Olympics in Lillehammer.
