= Reto Götschi =

Swiss bobsledder (born 1965)

Personal information
- Born: 25 December 1965 (age 60) Hausen am Albis, Switzerland
Medal record
Bobsleigh
Representing Switzerland
Olympic Games
Silver medal – second place	1994 Lillehammer	Two-man
World Championships
Gold medal – first place	1997 St. Moritz	Two-man
Silver medal – second place	2001 St. Moritz	Two-man
Bronze medal – third place	1996 Calgary	Two-man

Reto Götschi (born 25 December 1965, in Hausen am Albis) is a Swiss bobsledder who competed in the 1990s. He won a silver medal in the two-man event with teammate Guido Acklin at the 1994 Winter Olympics in Lillehammer.

Götschi also won a complete set of medals in the two-man event at the FIBT World Championships with a gold in 1997, a silver in 2001, and a bronze in 1996.

His best finish in the Bobsleigh World Cup was second four times (Combined men's: 1994–95, 1998–99; Two-man: 1994–95, 1998–99).
