= Mārcis Rullis =

Latvian bobsledder

Personal information
- Nationality: Latvian
- Born: 31 January 1979 (age 46); Valka, Latvia

Sport
- Sport: Bobsleigh

Mārcis Rullis (born 31 January 1979) is a Latvian bobsledder. He competed at the 2002 Winter Olympics and the 2006 Winter Olympics.
