= Hans Hiltebrand =

Swiss bobsledder (born 1945)

Medal record

Bobsleigh

World Championships
Gold medal – first place	1977 St. Moritz	Two-man
Gold medal – first place	1987 St. Moritz	Four-man
Silver medal – second place	1981 Cortina d'Ampezzo	Four-man
Silver medal – second place	1982 St. Moritz	Two-man
Silver medal – second place	1987 St. Moritz	Four-man

Hans Hiltebrand (born 18 January 1945) is a Swiss bobsledder who competed from the late 1970s to the late 1980s. He won five medals at the FIBT World Championships with two golds (Two-man: 1977, Four-man: 1987) and three silvers (Two-man: 1982, 1987; Four-man: 1981.

Competing in three Winter Olympics, Hiltebrand earned his best finish of fourth in the two-man event at Lake Placid in 1980.

Following his retirement, he coached Canada's bobsleigh from 1989 to the 1998 Winter Olympics. Afterwards he became a well known bobsleigh designer.

Hiltebrand is still active in his bobsleigh club in Zurich as of 2007.
