= Matthias Legler =

East German bobsledder

Medal record

Men's Bobsleigh

Representing East Germany

World Championships
| Silver medal – second place | 1985 Cervinia | Four-man |

Matthias Legler is an East German bobsledder who competed in the mid-1980s. He won a silver medal in the four-man event at the 1985 FIBT World Championships in Cervinia.
