= Erwin Arnold =

Austrian bobsledder

Personal information
- Nationality: Austrian
- Born: 5 November 1968 (age 57) Hall in Tirol, Austria

Sport
- Sport: Bobsleigh

Erwin Arnold (born 5 November 1968) is an Austrian former bobsledder. He competed in the four man event at the 1998 Winter Olympics.
