= Ion Panțuru =

Romanian bobsledder

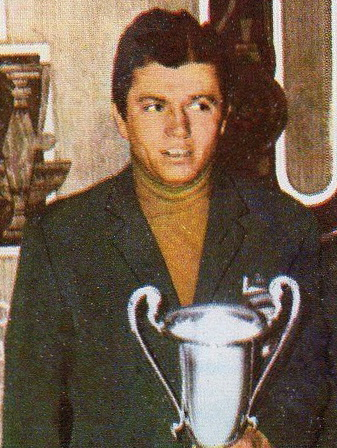
- Panțuru in 1973

Personal information
- Born: 11 September 1934 Comarnic, Romania
- Died: 17 January 2016 (aged 81) Ploiești, Romania
- Height: 172 cm (5 ft 8 in)
- Weight: 77 kg (170 lb)

Sport
- Sport: Bobsleigh
- Club: Bobclub Sinaia
Medal record
Men's bobsleigh
Representing Romania
Olympic Games
Bronze medal – third place	1968 Grenoble	Two-man
World Championships
Silver medal – second place	1969 Lake Placid	Two-man
Bronze medal – third place	1973 Lake Placid	Two-man
European Championships
Gold medal – first place	1967 Igls	Four-man
Silver medal – second place	1967 Igls	Two-man
Silver medal – second place	1968 St. Moritz	Four-man
Silver medal – second place	1969 Cervinia	Two-man
Bronze medal – third place	1970 Cortina d'Ampezzo	Four-man

Ion Panţuru (11 September 1934 – 17 January 2016) was a Romanian bobsledder. He competed in two-man and four-man events at the 1964, 1968, 1972 and 1976 Olympics and served as the Olympic flag bearer for Romania in 1964 and 1972.

Panţuru took up bobsleigh at the age of 24, after playing as a football goalkeeper at the Divizia B-level. At the 1968 Games he won a bronze medal with brakeman Nicolae Neagoe, which remains Romania's only medal at the Winter Olympics. At the same Olympics he was also close to a bronze medal in the four-man competition, placing fourth. At the FIBT World Championships he won two medals in the two-man event, together with another brakeman Dumitru Focșeneanu, with a silver in 1969 and a bronze in 1973. At the European championships Panţuru won four-man gold medals in 1967 and 1971, placing second in four-man in 1968–69 and in two-man events in 1967 and 1969; he also won a four-man bronze medal in 1970.

Panţuru lost his 1969 World Championships medal in a car on his way to the airport. The medal was found in a basement 30 years later, and returned to Panțuru. After retiring from competitions he worked as a national bobsleigh coach. For his sports achievements he was made an honorary citizen of three Romanian towns: Comarnic, Sinaia and Busteni.
