= Christoph Bartsch =

German bobsledder

Medal record

Men's Bobsleigh

Representing Germany

World Championships
Silver medal – second place	1997 St. Moritz	Four-man

Christoph Bartsch is a German bobsledder who competed in the late 1990s. He won a silver medal in the four-man event at the 1997 FIBT World Championships in St. Moritz.
