= Walter Rahm =

Swiss bobsledder (born 1954)

Personal information
- Nationality: Swiss
- Born: 17 April 1954 (age 72)

Sport
- Sport: Bobsleigh

Walter Rahm (born 17 April 1954) is a Swiss bobsledder. He competed in the two man and the four man events at the 1980 Winter Olympics.
