= Nico Baracchi =

Swiss bobsledder and skeleton racer

Medal record

World Championships

Skeleton
Silver medal – second place	1982 St. Moriz	Men's

Bobsleigh
Silver medal – second place	1989 Cortina d'Ampezzo	Four-man

Nico Baracchi (April 19, 1957 – March 24, 2015) was a Swiss bobsledder and skeleton racer who competed from the early 1980s to the late 1990s. He won two silver medals at the FIBT World Championships with his first in skeleton at St. Moritz in 1982 and his second in bobsleigh's four-man event at Cortina d'Ampezzo in 1989. Baracchi died on March 24, 2015, at the age of 57 in his home of Celerina, Switzerland.

Barrachi's best finish in the Bobsleigh World Cup was third in 1988-9, both in the combined men's and two-man events.

When skeleton was reintroduced as a sport in 1989, Baracchi tried to regain his success in the early 1980s, but without much success. His best finish at the world championships after 1989 was 11th in the men's event at Igls in 1991.
