= Christophe Fouquet =

French bobsledder

Christophe Fouquet (French: [kʁistɔf fukɛ]; born 5 May 1975) is a French bobsledder who competed from 1996 to 2006. His best Bobsleigh World Cup finish was sixth at Lake Placid in February 2005.

Fouquet finished 24th in the two-man event at the 2005 FIBT World Championships in Calgary. Competing in two Winter Olympics, his best finish was fifth in the four-man event at Salt Lake City in 2002.
