= Alain Wicki =

Swiss skeleton racer

Medal record

Skeleton

Representing Switzerland

World Championships
| Gold medal – first place | 1989 St. Moritz | Men |
| Silver medal – second place | 1998 St. Moritz | Men |
| Bronze medal – third place | 1982 St. Moritz | Men |

Alain Wicki (born 6 July 1962) is a Swiss skeleton racer who competed from the 1980s to the early first decade of the 21st century. He won a complete set of medals in the men's event at the FIBT World Championships with a gold in 1989, a silver in 1998, and a bronze in 1982.

Wicki won the overall men's Skeleton World Cup title in 1988-9. Before his career in skeleton racing, he played several years in the Swiss basketball team as teenager, but never broke through.
