= Rolf Strittmatter =

Swiss bobsledder (born 1955)

Medal record

Bobsleigh

World Championships
Gold medal – first place	1983 Lake Placid	Four-man

Rolf Strittmatter (born 26 July 1955) is a Swiss bobsledder who competed in the early 1980s. He won a gold medal in the four-man event at the 1983 FIBT World Championships in Lake Placid, New York. He competed as an athlete at the 1980 Summer Olympics in the men's 4 × 400 m relay.
