= Ion Zangor =

Romanian bobsledder

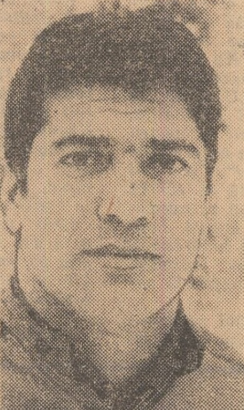
- Zangor în 1971

Personal information
- Born: 5 July 1938 Azuga, Romania
- Died: 1973 (aged 34–35)

Sport
- Sport: Bobsleigh
Medal record
Men's bobsleigh
Representing Romania
European Championships
Gold medal – first place	1971 Igls	Four-man
Bronze medal – third place	1970 Cortina d'Ampezzo	Four-man

Ion Zangor (5 July 1938 – 1973) was a Romanian bobsledder. He competed in the two-man and the four man events at the 1972 Winter Olympics.
