= Frank Jacob (bobsleigh) =

German bobsledder and coach

Frank Jacob is a German bobsledder and bobsleigh coach.

Jacob was a bobsleigh coach at 2014 Winter Olympics. He won a bronze medal in Bobsleigh and Skeleton European Championship 1991.
