= Dietmar Jerke =

East German bobsledder

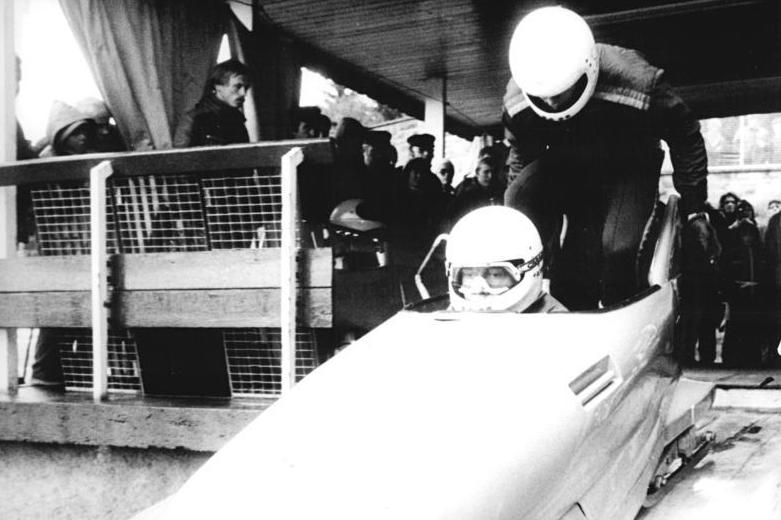
- Jerke (back) jumping into sled in 1982.
Medal record
Men's Bobsleigh
Representing East Germany
World Championships
Silver medal – second place	1985 Cervinia	Four-man
Bronze medal – third place	1983 Lake Placid	Four-man

Dietmar Jerke is an East German bobsledder who competed in the 1980s. He won two medals in the four-man event at the FIBT World Championships with a silver in 1985 and a bronze in 1983.
