= Alex Metzger (bobsledder) =

German bobsledder (born 1973)

Personal information
- Born: 22 February 1973 (age 53)
Medal record
Men's Bobsleigh
Representing Germany
World Championships
Gold medal – first place	2001 St. Moritz	Four-man

Alexander Metzger (born 22 February 1973) is a German bobsledder who has competed since 1998. He won the gold medal in the four-man event at the 2001 FIBT World Championships in St. Moritz.

Metzger also finished fifth in the four-man event at the 2006 Winter Olympics in Turin
