= Peter Schärer =

Swiss bobsledder

Medal record

Bobsleigh

World Championships
| Gold medal – first place | 1971 Cervinia | Four-man |
| Gold medal – first place | 1973 Lake Placid | Four-man |
| Gold medal – first place | 1975 Cervinia | Four-man |
| Bronze medal – third place | 1970 St. Moritz | Four-man |

Peter Schärer is a Swiss bobsledder who competed in the early 1970s. He won four medals in the four-man event at the FIBT World Championships with three golds (1971, 1973, 1975) and one bronze (1970).
