= Steffen Grummt =

East German decathlete and bobsledder

Personal information
- Born: 15 September 1959 (age 67)
Medal record
Men's Bobsleigh
Representing East Germany
World Championships
Gold medal – first place	1985 Cervinia	Four-man
Silver medal – second place	1985 Cervinia	Two-man
Bronze medal – third place	1986 Königssee	Two-man

Steffen Grummt (born 15 September 1959 in Wilkau-Haßlau, Saxony) is an East German decathlete who competed from the late 1970s to 1983. He later competed in bobsleigh in the mid-1980s.

== Biography ==
As a decathlete, Grummt finished eighth at the 1980 Summer Olympics in Moscow. He also finished fourth at the 1982 European Championships in Athletics in Athens and eighth at the 1983 World Championships in Athletics in Helsinki. Following East Germany's boycott of the 1984 Summer Olympics in Los Angeles, Grummt switched to bobsleigh where he found better success.

In bobsledding, Grummt won a complete set of medals at the FIBT World Championships with a gold (Four-man: 1985), a silver (Two-man: 1985), and a bronze (Two-man: 1986).

Grummt is head of the sports school in Mainz, Germany. He is married to Kornelia Ender who won a combined nine medals in women's swimming at the Summer Olympics in both 1972 and 1976.
