= Thomas Forch =

East German bobsledder

Medal record

Men's Bobsleigh

Representing East Germany

World Championships
Bronze medal – third place	1983 Lake Placid	Four-man

Thomas Forch was an East German bobsledder who competed in the early 1980s. He won a bronze medal in the four-man bobsleigh event at the 1983 FIBT World Championships in Lake Placid, New York.
