= Volker Dietrich =

East German bobsledder

Medal record

Men's Bobsleigh

Representing East Germany

World Cup Championships
Silver medal – second place	1987-88	Two-man
Bronze medal – third place	1987-88	Combined
Bronze medal – third place	1987-88	Four-man

Volker Dietrich was an East German bobsledder who competed in the late 1980s. He is best known for his finishes in the 1987-8 Bobsleigh World Cup season, finishing second in the two-man event and third both in the combined men's and four-man events.
