= Hans Märcy =

Swiss bobsledder

Medal record

Bobsleigh

World Championships
Gold medal – first place	1983 Lake Placid	Four-man

Hans Märcy is a Swiss bobsledder who competed in the early 1980s. He won a gold medal in the four-man event at the 1983 FIBT World Championships in Lake Placid, New York.
