= Udo Lehmann =

German bobsledder

Medal record

Men's Bobsleigh

Representing Germany

World Championships
Gold medal – first place	2004 Königssee	Four-man
Bronze medal – third place	1995 Winterberg	Four-man

Udo Lehmann (born 28 May 1973) is a German bobsledder who competed from 1994 to 2004. He won two medals in the four-man event at the FIBT World Championships with a gold in 2004 and a bronze in 1995.
