= Gert Elsässer =

Austrian skeleton racer

Medal record

Skeleton

World Championships
| Gold medal – first place | 1982 St. Moritz | Men |

Gert Elsässer (born 1949) is an Austrian skeleton racer who competed in the early 1980s. He won the gold medal in the men's event at the first skeleton World Championships in 1982 in St. Moritz. He was European champion in 1981 and 1982 and came in second in 1983. Elsässer was born in Innsbruck.
