= Andreas Kirchner =

East German bobsledder

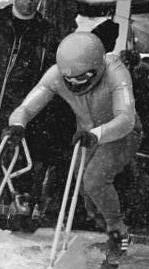
- Kirchner in 1979
Medal record
Men's bobsleigh
Representing East Germany
Olympic Games
Gold medal – first place	1984 Sarajevo	Four-man
Bronze medal – third place	1980 Lake Placid	Four-man
World Championships
Silver medal – second place	1981 Cortina d'Ampezzo	Two-man
Bronze medal – third place	1982 St. Moritz	Two-man

Andreas Kirchner (17 August 1953 – 10 November 2010) was an East German hammer thrower and bob pusher for record holder Wolfgang Hoppe.

He competed in the late 1970s and early 1980s. Competing in two Winter Olympics, he won two medals in the four-man with a gold in 1984 and a bronze in 1980. He was born in Erlbach-Kirchberg, Saxony.

Kirchner also won two medals in the two-man event at the FIBT World Championships with a silver in 1981 and a bronze in 1982.

On 15 November 2010 he was found dead in his apartment in Suhl, Thuringia where he worked as a teacher. He was 57.
