= Dirk Wiese (bobsleigh) =

German bobsledder

Medal record

Men's Bobsleigh

Representing Germany

World Championships
Silver medal – second place	1997 St. Moritz	Four-man

World Cup Championships
Silver medal – second place	1993-94	Four-man
Bronze medal – third place	1994-95	Four-man

Dirk Wiese is a German bobsledder who competed in the 1990s. He won a silver medal in the four-man event at the 1997 FIBT World Championships in St. Moritz.

Wiese also 11th in the two-man event at the 1998 Winter Olympics in Nagano.

His best finish in the Bobsleigh World Cup championship was second in the four-man event in 1993-4.
