= Nicolae Veștea =

Romanian biathlete (born 1950)

Personal information
- Nationality: Romanian
- Born: 11 July 1950 (age 74); Râșnov, Romania

Sport
- Sport: Biathlon

Nicolae Veștea (born 11 July 1950) is a Romanian biathlete. He competed in the 20 km individual event at the 1972 Winter Olympics.
