= Urs Salzmann =

Swiss bobsledder (born 1954)

Medal record

Bobsleigh

Olympic Games
Bronze medal – third place	1984 Sarajevo	Four-man

World Championships
Gold medal – first place	1982 St. Moritz	Four-man
Bronze medal – third place	1985 Cervinia	Four-man

Urs Salzmann and teammates in 1983

Urs Salzmann (born 3 July 1954) is a Swiss bobsledder who competed during the early to mid-1980s. He won a bronze medal in the four-man event at the 1984 Winter Olympics in Sarajevo.

Salzmann also won two medals in the four-man event at the FIBT World Championships with a gold in 1982 and a bronze in 1985.
