= FIBT World Championships 1982 =

Winter sport competition

1982 World Championships
- Location: St. Moritz, Switzerland

The FIBT World Championships 1982 took place in St. Moritz, Switzerland for the record fourteenth time. The Swiss city had hosted the event previously in 1931 (Four-man), 1935 (Four-man), 1937 (Four-man), 1938 (Two-man), 1939 (Two-man), 1947, 1955, 1957, 1959, 1965, 1970, 1974, and 1977. The skeleton event debuted at the championships after being held in St. Moritz at the 1928 and 1948 Winter Olympics and it marked the first time the event took place on the actual bobsleigh track and not on the Cresta Run.

== Two man bobsleigh ==
Pos	Team	Time
Gold	Switzerland (Erich Schärer, Max Rüegg)	
Silver	Switzerland (Hans Hiltebrand, Ulrich Bächli)	
Bronze	East Germany (Horst Schönau, Andreas Kirchner)	

== Four man bobsleigh ==
Pos	Team	Time
Gold	Switzerland (Silvio Giobellina, Heinz Stettler, Urs Salzmann, Rico Freiermuth)	
Silver	East Germany (Bernhard Lehmann, Roland Wetzig, Bogdan Musioł, Eberhard Weise)	
Bronze	Switzerland (Erich Schärer, Franz Isenegger, Tony Rüegg, Max Rüegg)	

== Men's skeleton ==
Pos	Athlete	Time
Gold	Gert Elässer (AUT)	
Silver	Nico Baracchi (SUI)	
Bronze	Alain Wicki (SUI)	

== Medal table ==
Rank	Nation	Gold	Silver	Bronze	Total
1	Switzerland (SUI)	2	2	2	6
2	Austria (AUT)	1	0	0	1
3	East Germany (GDR)	0	1	1	2
Totals (3 entries)		3	3	3	9
