= Rico Freiermuth =

Swiss bobsledder (born 1958)

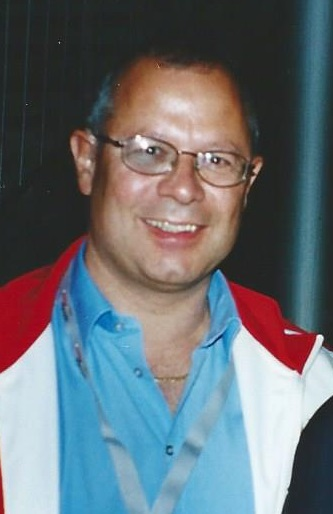
- Freiermuth in 2006

Personal information
- Born: 1 January 1958 (age 68) Liestal, Basel-Land
Medal record
Bobsleigh
Representing Switzerland
Olympic Games
Bronze medal – third place	1984 Sarajevo	Four-man
World Championships
Gold medal – first place	1982 St. Moritz	Four-man
Bronze medal – third place	1985 Cervinia	Four-man

Rico Freiermuth (born 1 January 1958 in Liestal, Basel-Land) is a Swiss bobsledder who competed during the early to mid-1980s. He won a bronze medal in the four-man event at the 1984 Winter Olympics in Sarajevo.

Freiermuth also won two medals in the four-man event at the FIBT World Championships with a gold in 1982 and a bronze in 1985.

After his retirement he coached fellow Swiss bobsledder Ivo Rüegg.
