= Vladimir Aleksandrov (bobsleigh) =

Soviet bobsledder

Olympic medal record

Bobsleigh
Bronze medal – third place	1984 Sarajevo	Two-man

Vladimir Aleksandrov (born February 7, 1958) is a Soviet bobsledder who competed in the early 1980s. He won the bronze medal in the two-man event at the 1984 Winter Olympics in Sarajevo.
