= Silvio Giobellina =

Swiss bobsledder (born 1954)

Medal record

Bobsleigh

Olympic Games
| Bronze medal – third place | 1984 Sarajevo | Four-man |

World Championships
| Gold medal – first place | 1982 St. Moritz | Four-man |
| Bronze medal – third place | 1985 Cervinia | Four-man |

Silvio Giobellina (born 28 February 1954) is a Swiss bobsledder who competed during the early to mid-1980s. He won a bronze medal in the four-man event at the 1984 Winter Olympics in Sarajevo.

Giobellina also won two medals in the four-man event at the FIBT World Championships with a gold in 1982 and a bronze in 1985.
