= René Spies =

German bobsledder (born 1973)

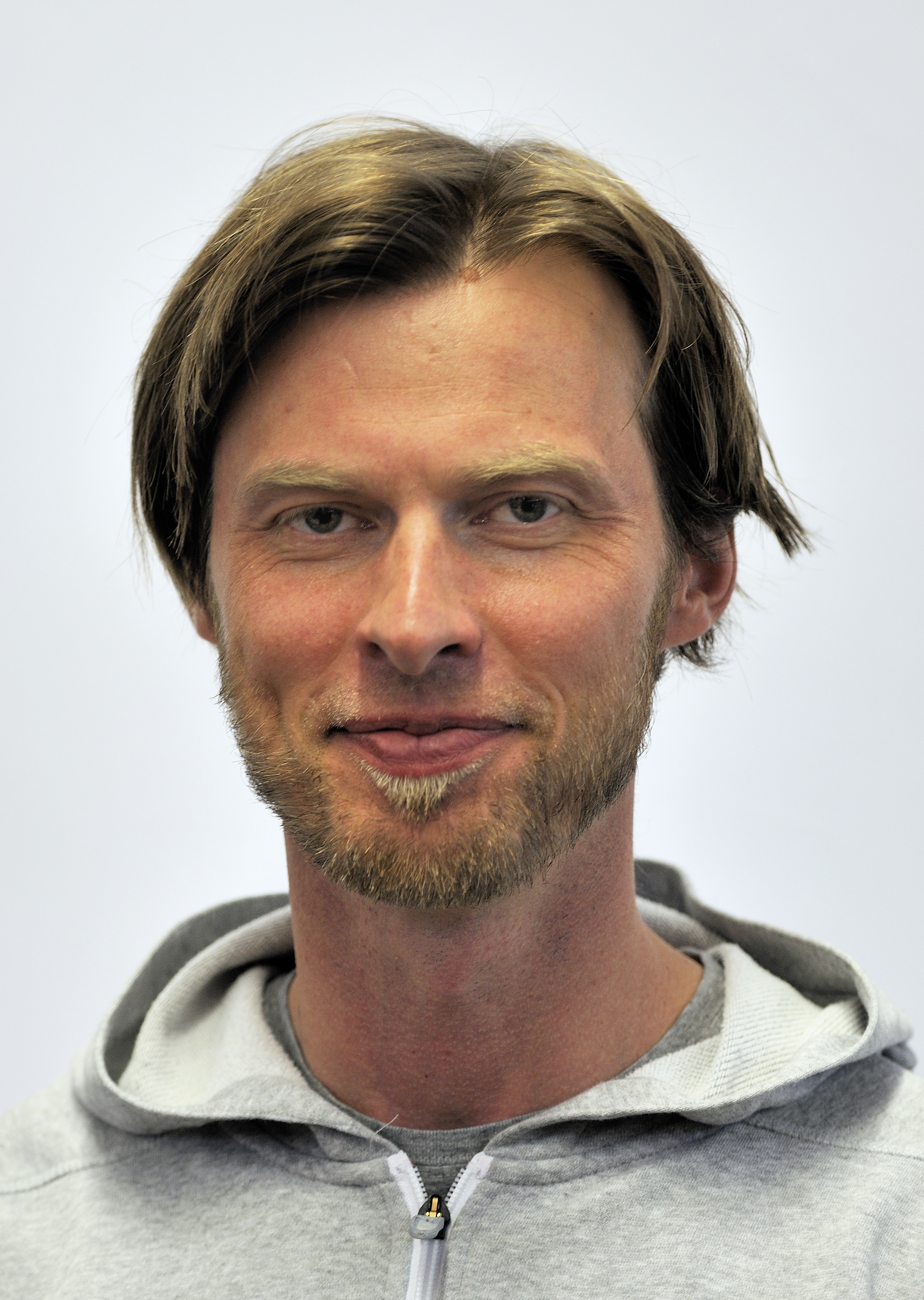

Personal information
- Nationality: German
- Born: 5 July 1973 (age 53) Winterberg, North Rhine-Westphalia, West Germany
- Height: 1.85 m (6 ft 1 in)
- Weight: 95 kg (209 lb; 15.0 st)

Sport
- Country: Germany
- Sport: Bobsleigh
- Club: BSC Winterberg
- Retired: 2007
Medal record
Men's Bobsleigh
Representing Germany
World Championships
Bronze medal – third place	2003 Lake Placid	Two-man
World Cup Championships
Silver medal – second place	2001-02	Two-man
Silver medal – second place	2002-03	Combined
Silver medal – second place	2002-03	Two-man

René Spies (born 5 July 1973 in Winterberg, North Rhine-Westphalia) is a German bobsledder who competed from 1991 to 2006. He won a bronze medal in the two-man event at the 2003 FIBT World Championships in Lake Placid, New York.

Competing in two Winter Olympics, Spies earned his best finish of fifth in the four-man event at Turin in 2006.

His best finish in the Bobsleigh World Cup was second three times (Combined: 2002-3, Two-man: 2000-1, 2002-3).

Spies retired from bobsleigh to become a television commentator in Germany, but attempted to return to the German national team for the 2007-08 season without success. He announced his retirement from competition on November 1, 2007 which was announced on the FIBT website.
