= Heinz Stettler =

Swiss bobsledder (1952–2006)

Personal information
- Born: 1 March 1952 Regensdorf, Switzerland
- Died: May 24, 2006 (aged 54)

Sport
- Sport: Bobsleigh
- Retired: 1985
Medal record
Bobsleigh
Olympic Games
Bronze medal – third place	1984 Sarajevo	Four-man
World Championships
Gold medal – first place	1982 St. Moritz	Four-man
Bronze medal – third place	1985 Cervinia	Four-man

Heinz Stettler (March 1, 1952 – May 24, 2006) was a Swiss bobsledder who competed during the early to mid-1980s. He won a bronze medal in the four-man event at the 1984 Winter Olympics in Sarajevo.

Stettler also won two medals in the four-man event at the FIBT World Championships with a gold in 1982 and a bronze in 1985.

He was also active in track and field, excelling in the shot put and discus throw. Stettler died of a heart attack in 2006.
