= Zintis Ekmanis =

Latvian bobsledder

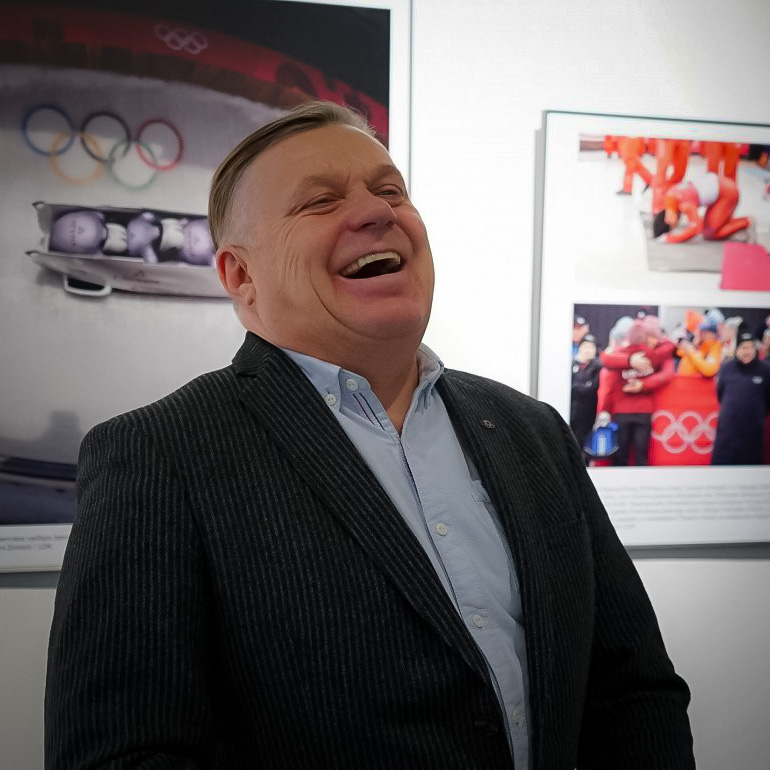

Medal record

Men's bobsleigh

Representing the Soviet Union

Olympic Games
Bronze medal – third place	1984 Sarajevo	Two-man

World Championships
Bronze medal – third place	1985 Cervinia	Two-man

Zintis Ekmanis (born 17 May 1958) is a former Latvian bobsledder who competed from the early 1980s to the mid-1990s. Competing in four Winter Olympics, he won the bronze medal in the two-man event at Sarajevo in 1984.

Ekmanis also won a bronze medal in the two-man event at the 1985 FIBT World Championships in Cervinia. During the Bobsleigh World Cup of 1986-7, he finished third in the two-man event.
