= Eberhard Weise =

East German bobsledder

Medal record

Men's bobsleigh

Representing East Germany

Olympic Games
Silver medal – second place	1984 Sarajevo	Four-man

World Championships
Silver medal – second place	1982 St. Moritz	Four-man

Eberhard Wiese (born 3 August 1953) is an East German bobsledder who competed during the mid-1980s. He won a silver medal in the four-man event at the 1984 Winter Olympics in Sarajevo.

Weise also earned a silver medal in the four-man event at the 1982 FIBT World Championships in St. Moritz.
