= Roland Wetzig =

East German bobsledder

Medal record

Men's bobsleigh

Representing East Germany

Olympic Games
Gold medal – first place	1984 Sarajevo	Four-man
Bronze medal – third place	1980 Lake Placid	Four-man

World Championships
Silver medal – second place	1982 St. Moritz	Four-man
Silver medal – second place	1987 St. Moritz	Four-man

Roland Wetzig (born 24 July 1959 in Oschatz, Saxony) is an East German bob pusher for 17-time gold medal winner Wolfgang Hoppe who competed from the late 1970s to the late 1980s. Competing in two Winter Olympics, he won two medals in the four-man with a gold in 1984 and a bronze in 1980.

Wetzig also won two silver medals in the four-man event at the FIBT World Championships, earning them in 1982 and 1987.
