= Bernhard Lehmann =

East German bobsledder

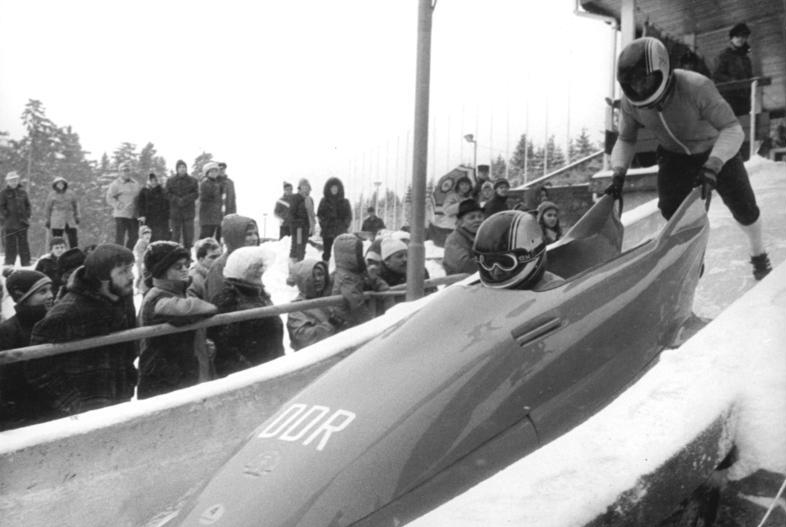
- Lehmann (seated with goggles) in 1983

Medal record

Men's bobsleigh

Representing East Germany

Olympic Games
Gold medal – first place	1976 Innsbruck	Four-man
Silver medal – second place	1984 Sarajevo	Two-man
Silver medal – second place	1984 Sarajevo	Four-man
Bronze medal – third place	1988 Calgary	Two-man

World Championships
Gold medal – first place	1985 Cervinia	Four-man
Silver medal – second place	1982 St. Moritz	Four-man

Bernhard Lehmann (born 11 January 1948 in Großräschen, Brandenburg) is an East German bobsledder who competed from the late 1970s to the late 1980s. Competing in three Winter Olympics, he won four medals with one gold (Four-man: 1976), two silvers (Two-man and four-man: both 1984), and one bronze (Two-man: 1988).

Lehmann also won two medals in the four-man event at the FIBT World Championships with a gold in 1985 and a silver in 1982.
