= Bobsleigh at the 1980 Winter Olympics =

Bobsleigh at the XIII Olympic Winter Games
- Venue: Mt. Van Hoevenberg Olympic Bobsled Run
- Dates: 15–24 February 1980
- Competitors: 78 from 11 nations

Bobsleigh at the 1980 Winter Olympics consisted of two events, at Mt. Van Hoevenberg Olympic Bobsled Run. The competition took place between 15 and 24 February 1980.

== Medal summary ==
=== Medal table ===
Rank	Nation	Gold	Silver	Bronze	Total
1	East Germany	1	1	2	4
2	Switzerland	1	1	0	2
Totals (2 entries)		2	2	2	6

Two countries won medals in Lake Placid, with East Germany leading the medal table.

=== Events ===
Event	Gold		Silver		Bronze	
Two-man	Switzerland (SUI-2); Erich Schärer; Joseph Benz	4:09.36	East Germany (GDR-2); Bernhard Germeshausen; Hans-Jürgen Gerhardt	4:10.93	East Germany (GDR-1); Meinhard Nehmer; Bogdan Musioł	4:11.08
Four-man	East Germany (GDR-1); Meinhard Nehmer; Bernhard Germeshausen; Bogdan Musioł; Hans-Jürgen Gerhardt	3:59.92	Switzerland (SUI-1); Erich Schärer; Ulrich Bächli; Rudolf Marti; Joseph Benz	4:00.87	East Germany (GDR-2); Horst Schönau; Roland Wetzig; Detlef Richter; Andreas Kirchner	4:00.97

== Participating NOCs ==
Eleven nations participated in bobsleigh at the 1980 Games.

- Austria (8)
- Canada (6)
- West Germany (10)
- Great Britain (10)
- East Germany (8)
- Italy (5)
- Japan (2)
- Romania (8)
- Switzerland (8)
- Sweden (4)
- United States (9)
