= Switzerland at the 1980 Winter Olympics =

- IOC code: SUI
- NOC: Swiss Olympic Association
- Website: www.swissolympic.ch (in German and French)

in Lake Placid
- Competitors: 44 (33 men, 11 women) in 9 sports
- Flag bearer: Marie-Theres Nadig (alpine skiing)
- Medals Ranked 10th: Gold 1 Silver 1 Bronze 3 Total 5

Winter Olympics appearances (overview)
- 1924; 1928; 1932; 1936; 1948; 1952; 1956; 1960; 1964; 1968; 1972; 1976; 1980; 1984; 1988; 1992; 1994; 1998; 2002; 2006; 2010; 2014; 2018; 2022; 2026; 2030

Switzerland competed at the 1980 Winter Olympics in Lake Placid, United States.

== Medalists ==
Medal	Name	Sport	Event
Gold	Erich Schärer; Josef Benz	Bobsleigh	Two-man
Silver	Erich Schärer; Ulrich Bächli; Rudolf Marti; Josef Benz	Bobsleigh	Four-man
Bronze	Jacques Lüthy	Alpine skiing	Men's slalom
Bronze	Marie-Theres Nadig	Alpine skiing	Women's downhill
Bronze	Erika Hess	Alpine skiing	Women's slalom

== Alpine skiing ==
Men

Athlete	Event	Race 1		Race 2		Total	
Athlete	Event	Time	Rank	Time	Rank	Time	Rank
Toni Bürgler	Downhill					DNF	–
Erwin Josi	Downhill					1:50.03	24
Urs Räber	Downhill					1:49.16	18
Peter Müller	Downhill					1:46.75	4
Jean-Luc Fournier	Giant Slalom	DNF	–	–	–	DNF	–
Peter Lüscher	Giant Slalom	DNF	–	–	–	DNF	–
Jacques Lüthy	Giant Slalom	1:21.55	11	1:21.20	2	2:42.75	5
Joël Gaspoz	Giant Slalom	1:21.10	5	1:21.95	6	2:43.05	7
Peter Lüscher	Slalom	DNF	–	–	–	DNF	–
Joël Gaspoz	Slalom	DNF	–	–	–	DNF	–
Jean-Luc Fournier	Slalom	58.95	28	54.53	23	1:53.48	23
Jacques Lüthy	Slalom	53.70	2	51.36	6	1:45.06	3rd place, bronze medalist(s)

Women

Athlete	Event	Race 1		Race 2		Total	
Athlete	Event	Time	Rank	Time	Rank	Time	Rank
Annemarie Bischofberger	Downhill					1:41.93	20
Doris de Agostini	Downhill					1:41.26	17
Bernadette Zurbriggen	Downhill					1:40.74	11
Marie-Theres Nadig	Downhill					1:38.36	3rd place, bronze medalist(s)
Marie-Theres Nadig	Giant Slalom	DNF	–	–	–	DNF	–
Brigitte Nansoz	Giant Slalom	1:18.09	18	1:30.11	15	2:48.20	16
Erika Hess	Giant Slalom	1:15.27	4	DNF	–	DNF	–
Marie-Theres Nadig	Slalom	DNF	–	–	–	DNF	–
Brigitte Nansoz	Slalom	45.52	17	DNF	–	DNF	–
Erika Hess	Slalom	43.50	5	44.39	5	1:27.89	3rd place, bronze medalist(s)

== Biathlon ==
Men

Event	Athlete	Misses ^{1}	Time	Rank
10 km Sprint	Roland Burn	5	36:52.35	32
10 km Sprint	Urs Brechbühl	4	36:22.66	30

Event	Athlete	Time	Penalties	Adjusted time ^{2}	Rank
20 km	Roland Burn	1'10:12.97	11	1'21:12.97	37
20 km	Urs Berchbühl	1'11:59.13	8	1'19:59.13	34

^{1} A penalty loop of 150 metres had to be skied per missed target.
^{2} One minute added per close miss (a hit in the outer ring), two minutes added per complete miss.

== Bobsleigh ==
Sled	Athletes	Event	Run 1		Run 2		Run 3		Run 4		Total	
Sled	Athletes	Event	Time	Rank	Time	Rank	Time	Rank	Time	Rank	Time	Rank
SUI-1	Hans Hiltebrand; Walter Rahm	Two-man	1:02.37	2	1:02.96	5	1:03.65	11	1:02.64	3	4:11.32	4
SUI-2	Erich Schärer; Sepp Benz	Two-man	1:01.87	1	1:02.76	2	1:02.29	1	1:02.44	1	4:09.36	1st place, gold medalist(s)

Sled	Athletes	Event	Run 1		Run 2		Run 3		Run 4		Total	
Sled	Athletes	Event	Time	Rank	Time	Rank	Time	Rank	Time	Rank	Time	Rank
SUI-1	Erich Schärer; Ueli Bächli; Ruedi Marti; Sepp Benz	Four-man	1:00.31	3	1:00.41	3	1:00.02	2	1:00.13	1	4:00.87	2nd place, silver medalist(s)
SUI-2	Hans Hiltebrand; Ulrich Schindler; Walter Rahm; Armin Baumgartner	Four-man	1:01.13	7	1:01.00	5	1:00.54	7	1:01.02	6	4:03.69	6

== Cross-country skiing ==
Men

Event	Athlete	Race	
Event	Athlete	Time	Rank
15 km	Alfred Schindler	44:52.93	35
15 km	Hansueli Kreuzer	44:44.66	32
15 km	Konrad Hallenbarter	44:42.12	29
15 km	Franz Renggli	44:38.66	27
30 km	Francis Jacot	1'36:50.46	42
30 km	Heinz Gähler	1'33:43.68	29
30 km	Gaudenz Ambühl	1'32:06.20	24
30 km	Eduard Hauser	1'31:20.09	15
50 km	Konrad Hallenbarter	DNF	–
50 km	Gaudenz Ambühl	DNF	–
50 km	Heinz Gähler	2'35:11.20	14
50 km	Franz Renggli	2'33:27.56	10

Men's 4 × 10 km relay

Athletes	Race	
Athletes	Time	Rank
Hansrüli Kreuzer; Konrad Hallenbarter; Eduard Hauser; Gaudenz Ambühl	2'03:36.57	7

Women

Event	Athlete	Race	
Event	Athlete	Time	Rank
5 km	Cornelia Thomas	16:43.85	34
5 km	Evi Kratzer	16:14.34	23
10 km	Cornelia Thomas	33:57.94	36
10 km	Evi Kratzer	33:03.65	27

== Figure skating ==
Women

Athlete	CF	SP	FS	Points	Places	Rank
Danielle Rieder	9	15	16	165.46	125	14
Denise Biellmann	12	1	1	180.46	43	4

== Luge ==
Men

Athlete	Run 1		Run 2		Run 3		Run 4		Total	
Athlete	Time	Rank	Time	Rank	Time	Rank	Time	Rank	Time	Rank
Ueli Schenkel	DNF	–	–	–	–	–	–	–	DNF	–
Markus Kägi	54.224	28	DNF	–	–	–	–	–	DNF	–

== Nordic combined ==
Events:

- normal hill ski jumping (Three jumps, best two counted and shown here.)
- 15 km cross-country skiing

Athlete	Event	Ski Jumping				Cross-country			Total	
Athlete	Event	Distance 1	Distance 2	Points	Rank	Time	Points	Rank	Points	Rank
Ernst Beetschen	Individual	73.0	72.0	170.3	27	50:09.2	198.295	16	368.595	21
Karl Lustenberger	Individual	83.0	80.0	212.7	6	50:01.1	199.510	14	412.210	6

== Ski jumping ==
Athlete	Event	Jump 1		Jump 2		Total	
Athlete	Event	Distance	Points	Distance	Points	Points	Rank
Paul Egloff	Normal hill	65.0	80.2	70.5	91.5	171.7	43
Robert Mösching	Normal hill	74.0	97.6	73.0	95.0	192.6	37
Hansjörg Sumi	Normal hill	83.0	117.5	86.5	125.1	242.6	9
Paul Egloff	Large hill	91.5	87.7	88.0	79.4	167.2	47
Karl Lustenberger	Large hill	98.0	104.4	95.0	98.7	203.1	30
Robert Mösching	Large hill	108.0	118.4	98.5	104.1	222.5	17
Hansjörg Sumi	Large hill	117.0	135.0	100.0	107.7	242.7	7

== Speed skating ==
Women

Event	Athlete	Race	
Event	Athlete	Time	Rank
500 m	Silvia Brunner	43.72	13
1000 m	Silvia Brunner	1:31.79	29
