= Bobsleigh at the 1980 Winter Olympics – Two-man =

Two-man at the XIII Olympic Winter Games
- Venue: Mt. Van Hoevenberg Olympic Bobsled Run
- Dates: February 15 – 16, 1980
- Competitors: 40 from 11 nations
- Winning time: 4:09.36

Medalists
1st place, gold medalist(s)		Switzerland; Erich Schärer, Sepp Benz
2nd place, silver medalist(s)		East Germany; Bernhard Germeshausen, Hans-Jürgen Gerhardt
3rd place, bronze medalist(s)		East Germany; Meinhard Nehmer, Bogdan Musioł

The Two-man bobsleigh competition at the 1980 Winter Olympics in Lake Placid was held on 15 and 16 February, at Mt. Van Hoevenberg Olympic Bobsled Run.

== Results ==
Rank	Country	Athletes	Run 1	Run 2	Run 3	Run 4	Total
1st place, gold medalist(s)	Switzerland (SUI-2)	Erich Schärer; Sepp Benz	61.87	62.76	62.29	62.44	4:09.36
2nd place, silver medalist(s)	East Germany (GDR-2)	Bernhard Germeshausen; Hans-Jürgen Gerhardt	62.58	62.48	63.31	62.56	4:10.93
3rd place, bronze medalist(s)	East Germany (GDR-1)	Meinhard Nehmer; Bogdan Musioł	62.39	62.88	62.86	62.95	4:11.08
4	Switzerland (SUI-1)	Hans Hiltebrand; Walter Rahm	62.37	62.96	63.35	62.64	4:11.32
5	United States (USA-2)	Howard Siler, Jr. Dick Nalley	63.04	63.04	62.65	63.00	4:11.73
6	United States (USA-1)	Brent Rushlaw; Joe Tyler	62.90	62.81	62.99	63.42	4:12.12
7	Austria (AUT-2)	Fritz Sperling; Kurt Oberhöller	63.58	63.64	63.13	63.23	4:13.58
8	West Germany (FRG-1)	Peter Hell; Heinz Busche	63.87	63.63	62.91	63.33	4:13.74
9	Austria (AUT-1)	Franz Paulweber; Gerd Zaunschirm	63.52	63.67	63.01	63.70	4:13.90
10	Great Britain (GBR-1)	Jonnie Woodall; John Howell	64.12	64.12	63.65	64.03	4:15.92
11	Romania (ROU-1)	Dragoș Panaitescu-Rapan; Gheorghe Lixandru	63.99	64.30	63.75	64.00	4:16.04
12	West Germany (FRG-2)	Georg Großmann; Alexander Wernsdorfer	63.50	64.93	63.85	63.85	4:16.13
13	Canada (CAN-1)	Joey Kilburn; Robert Wilson	64.07	64.27	63.96	63.91	4:16.21
14	Italy (ITA-1)	Andrea Jory; Edmund Lanziner	63.73	64.19	63.97	64.45	4:16.34
15	Sweden	Carl-Erik Eriksson; Kenth Rönn	63.56	64.49	63.22	65.65	4:16.92
16	Italy (ITA-2)	Giuseppe Soravia; Georg Werth	64.75	64.81	64.30	64.31	4:18.17
17	Great Britain (GBR-2)	Roger Potter; Michael Pugh	64.93	64.77	64.40	64.47	4:18.57
18	Romania (ROU-2)	Constantin Iancu; Constantin Obreja	64.58	64.52	64.76	64.77	4:18.63
19	Japan	Yoshimitsu Kadowaki; Yuji Funayama	64.62	64.92	64.82	64.30	4:18.66
20	Canada (CAN-2)	Brian Vachon; Serge Cantin	64.66	64.67	64.38	65.05	4:18.76
