= Bobsleigh at the 1976 Winter Olympics =

Bobsleigh at the XII Olympic Winter Games
- Venue: Olympic Sliding Centre Innsbruck
- Dates: 6–14 February 1976
- Competitors: 92 from 13 nations

Bobsleigh at the 1976 Winter Olympics consisted of two events, at Olympic Sliding Centre Innsbruck. The competition took place between 6 and 14 February 1976.

== Medal summary ==
=== Medal table ===
Rank	Nation	Gold	Silver	Bronze	Total
1	East Germany	2	0	0	2
2	Switzerland	0	1	1	2
2	West Germany	0	1	1	2
Totals (3 entries)		2	2	2	6

Three countries won medals in Innsbruck, with East Germany sweeping the gold medals.

=== Events ===
Event	Gold		Silver		Bronze	
Two-man	East Germany (GDR-2); Meinhard Nehmer; Bernhard Germeshausen	3:44.42	West Germany (FRG-1); Wolfgang Zimmerer; Manfred Schumann	3:44.99	Switzerland (SUI-1); Erich Schärer; Joseph Benz	3:45.70
Four-man	East Germany (GDR-1); Meinhard Nehmer; Jochen Babock; Bernhard Germeshausen; Bernhard Lehmann	3:40.43	Switzerland (SUI-2); Erich Schärer; Ulrich Bächli; Rudolf Marti; Joseph Benz	3:40.89	West Germany (FRG-1); Wolfgang Zimmerer; Peter Utzschneider; Bodo Bittner; Manfred Schumann	3:41.37

== Participating NOCs ==
Thirteen nations participated in bobsleigh at the 1976 Games. East Germany made their Olympic bobsleigh debut.

- Austria (10)
- Canada (9)
- France (5)
- West Germany (8)
- Great Britain (8)
- East Germany (8)
- Italy (9)
- Japan (4)
- Romania (8)
- Switzerland (8)
- Sweden (4)
- Czechoslovakia (2)
- United States (9)
