= List of Olympic venues in luge =

For the Winter Olympics, there are 14 venues that have been or will be used for luge. Initially separate from bobsleigh, the sports were first combined in 1976. Luge was combined with bobsleigh finally in 1984 and then with skeleton in 2002.

Games	Venue	Other sports hosted at venue for those games	Capacity	Ref.
1964 Innsbruck	Bob und Rodelbahn Igls	Bobsleigh (separate track)	Not listed.	
1968 Grenoble	Piste de Luge	None	Not listed.	
1972 Sapporo	Mt. Teine Luge Course	None	Not listed.	
1976 Innsbruck	Kombinierte Kunsteisbahn für Bob-Rodel Igls	Bobsleigh	Not listed.	
1980 Lake Placid	Mt. Van Hoevenberg Bob and Luge Run	Bobsleigh (separate track)	11,000 (bobsleigh)	
1984 Sarajevo	Sarajevo Olympic Bobsleigh and Luge Track	Bobsleigh	4,000 (luge); 7,500 (bobsleigh)	
1988 Calgary	Canada Olympic Park (includes bobsleigh/luge track)	Bobsleigh, Freestyle skiing (demonstration), Nordic combined (ski jumping), Ski jumping	25,000 (bobsleigh/luge); 35,000 (ski jumping); 15,000 (freestyle)	
1992 Albertville	La Plagne	Bobsleigh	Not listed.	
1994 Lillehammer	Lillehammer Olympic Bobsleigh and Luge Track	Bobsleigh	10,000	
1998 Nagano	Spiral	Bobsleigh	10,000	
2002 Salt Lake City	Utah Olympic Park Track	Bobsleigh, Skeleton	15,000)	
2006 Turin	Cesana Pariol	Bobsleigh, Skeleton	4,400	
2010 Vancouver	The Whistler Sliding Centre	Bobsleigh, Skeleton	12,000	
2014 Sochi	Sliding Center Sanki	Bobsleigh, Skeleton	9,000	
2018 PyeongChang	Olympic Sliding Centre	Bobsleigh, Skeleton	7,000 (including 6,000 standing)	
2022 Beijing	Yanqing National Sliding Centre	Bobsleigh, Skeleton	10,000 (including 8,500 standing)	
2026 Milan-Cortina	Eugenio Monti Olympic Track	Bobsleigh, Skeleton	Not listed.	
2030 French Alps	La Plagne	Bobsleigh, Skeleton	16,000	
2034 Utah	Utah Olympic Park Track	Bobsleigh, Skeleton	12,000	

== Gallery of venues ==
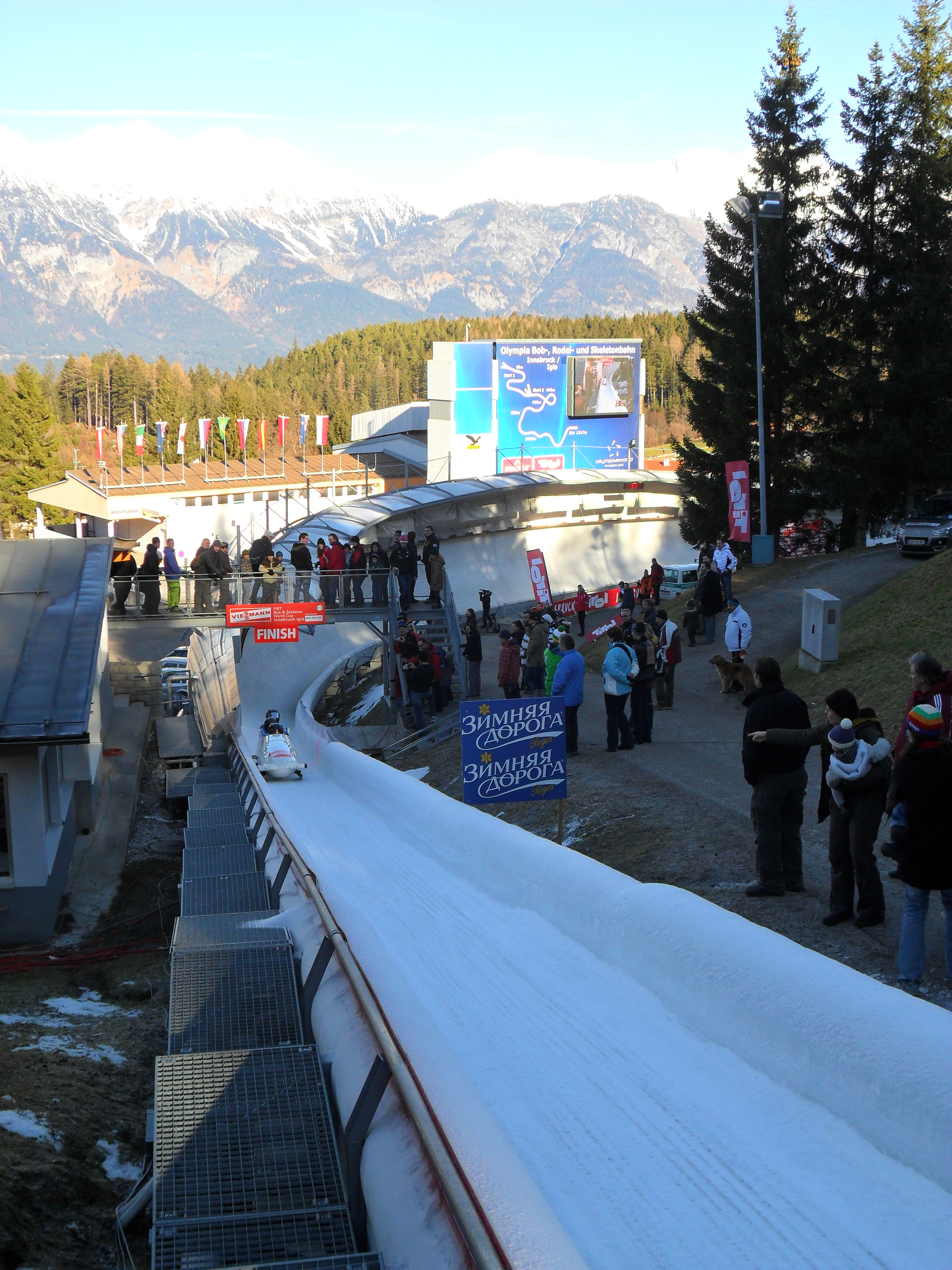
Olympic Sliding Centre Innsbruck hosted luge at the 1964 and 1976 Winter Olympics.

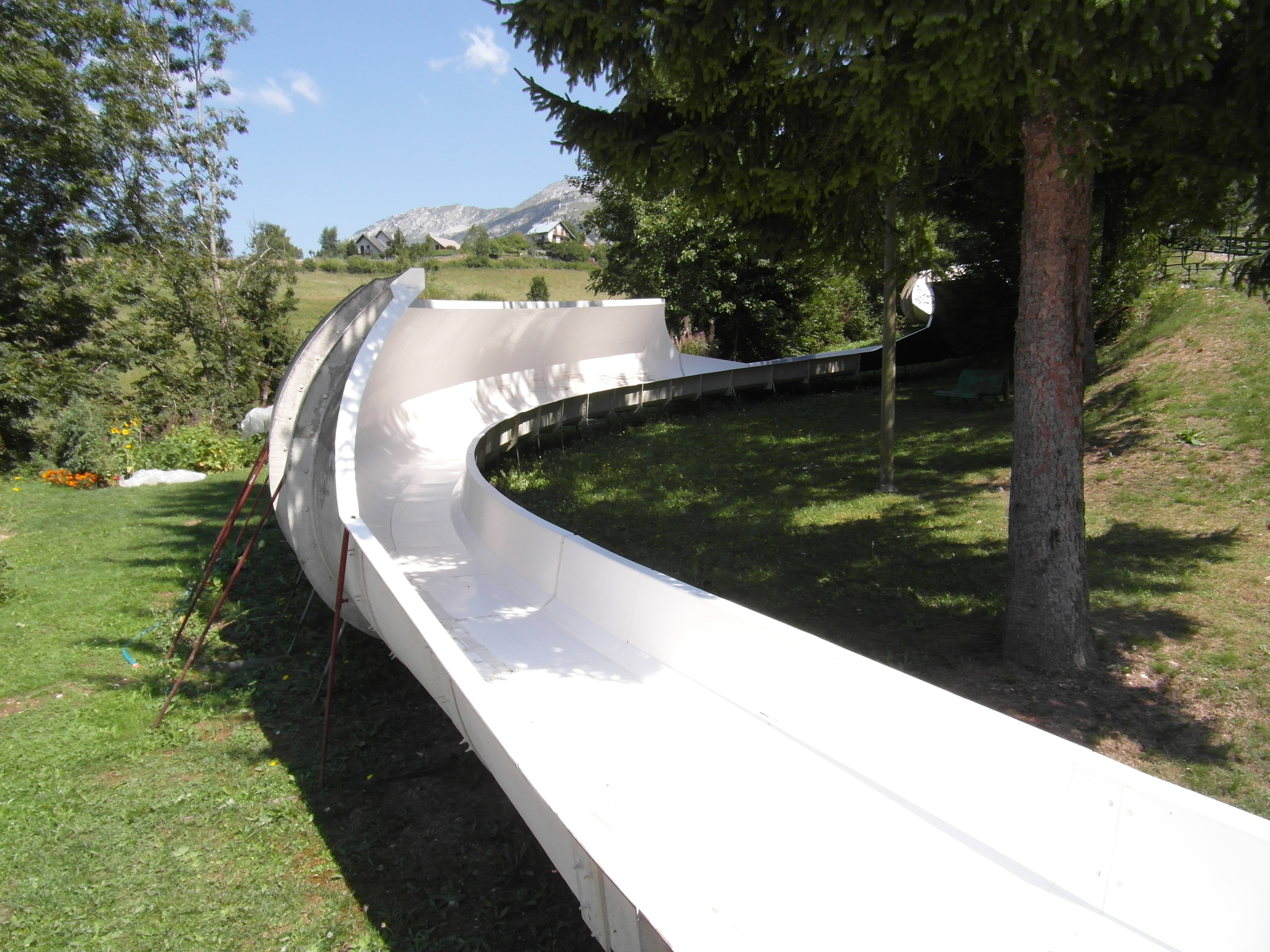
Piste olympique de luge de Villard-de-Lans hosted luge at the 1968 Winter Olympics in Grenoble.

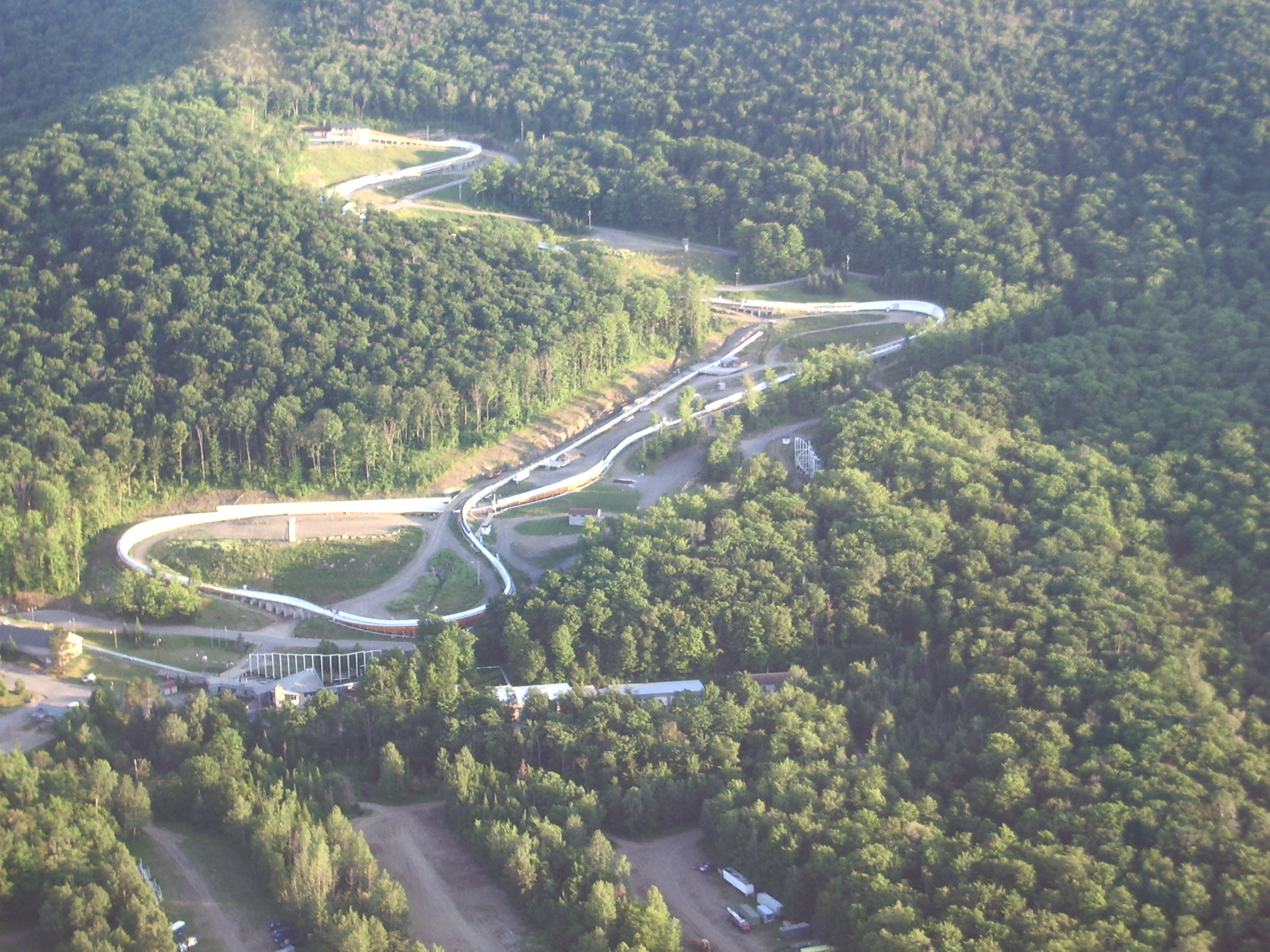
Mt. Van Hoevenberg Olympic Bobsled Run hosted luge at 1980 Winter Olympics in Lake Placid.

Sarajevo Olympic Bobsleigh and Luge Track hosted luge at the 1984 Winter Olympics.

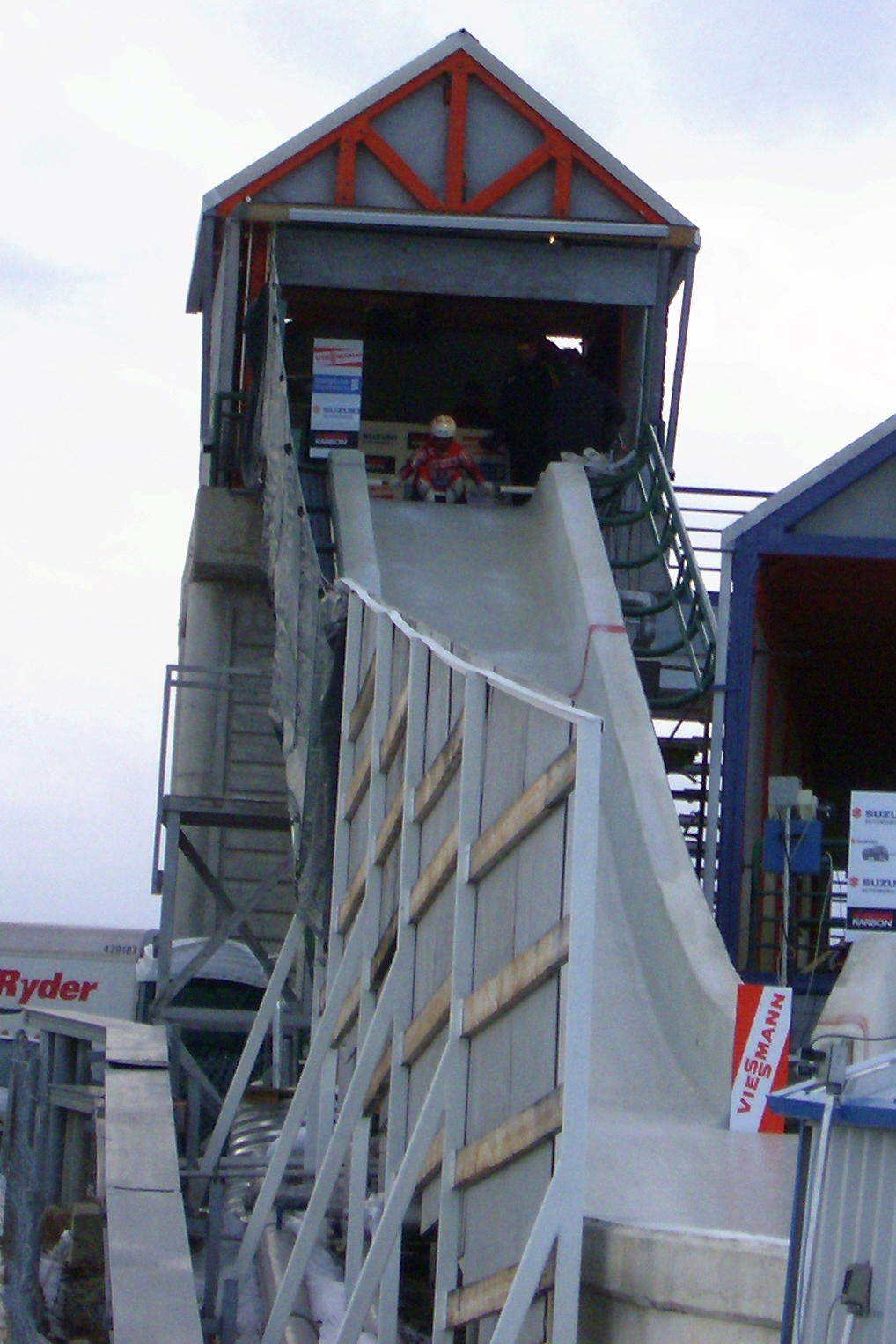
The Canada Olympic Park bobsleigh, luge, and skeleton track hosted luge at the 1988 Winter Olympics in Calgary.

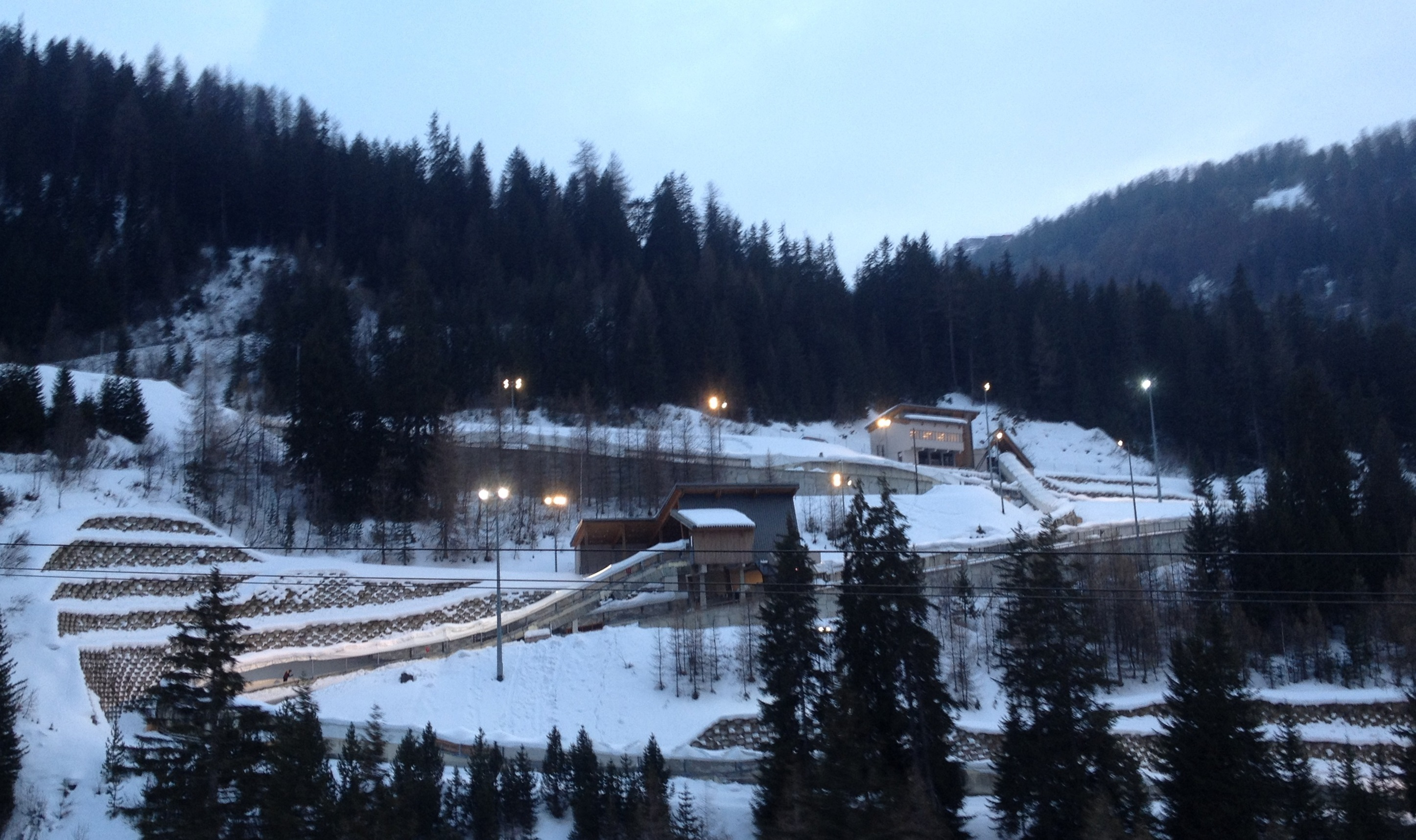
La Plagne bobsleigh, luge, and skeleton track hosted luge at the 1992 Winter Olympics in Albertville and will do so again at the 2030 Winter Olympics in the French Alps.

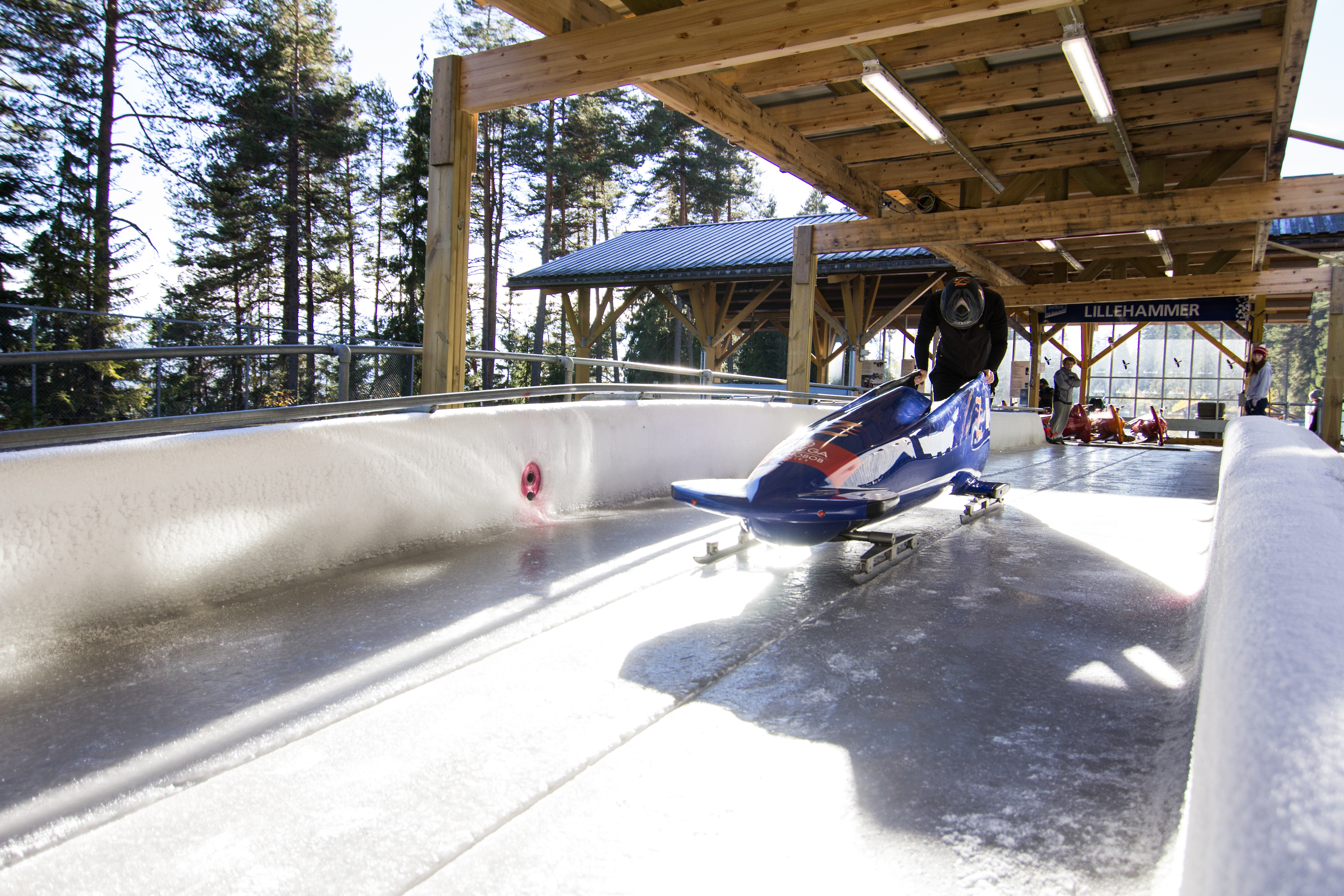
Lillehammer Olympic Bobsleigh and Luge Track hosted luge at the 1994 Winter Olympics.

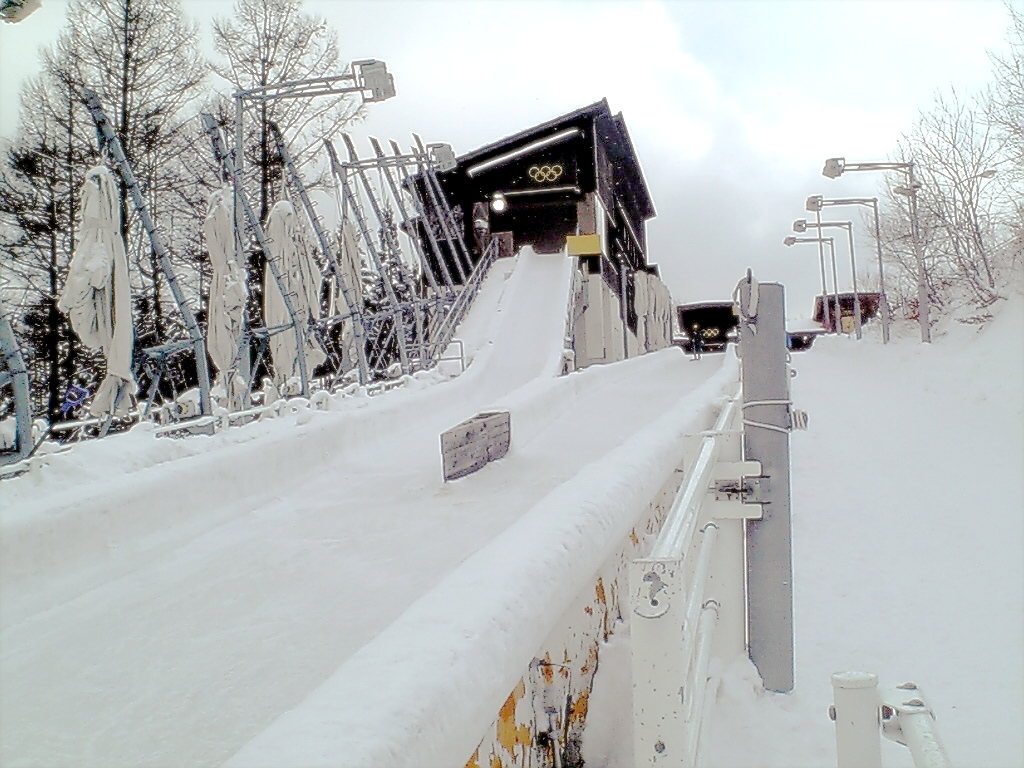
Spiral hosted luge at the 1998 Winter Olympics in Nagano.

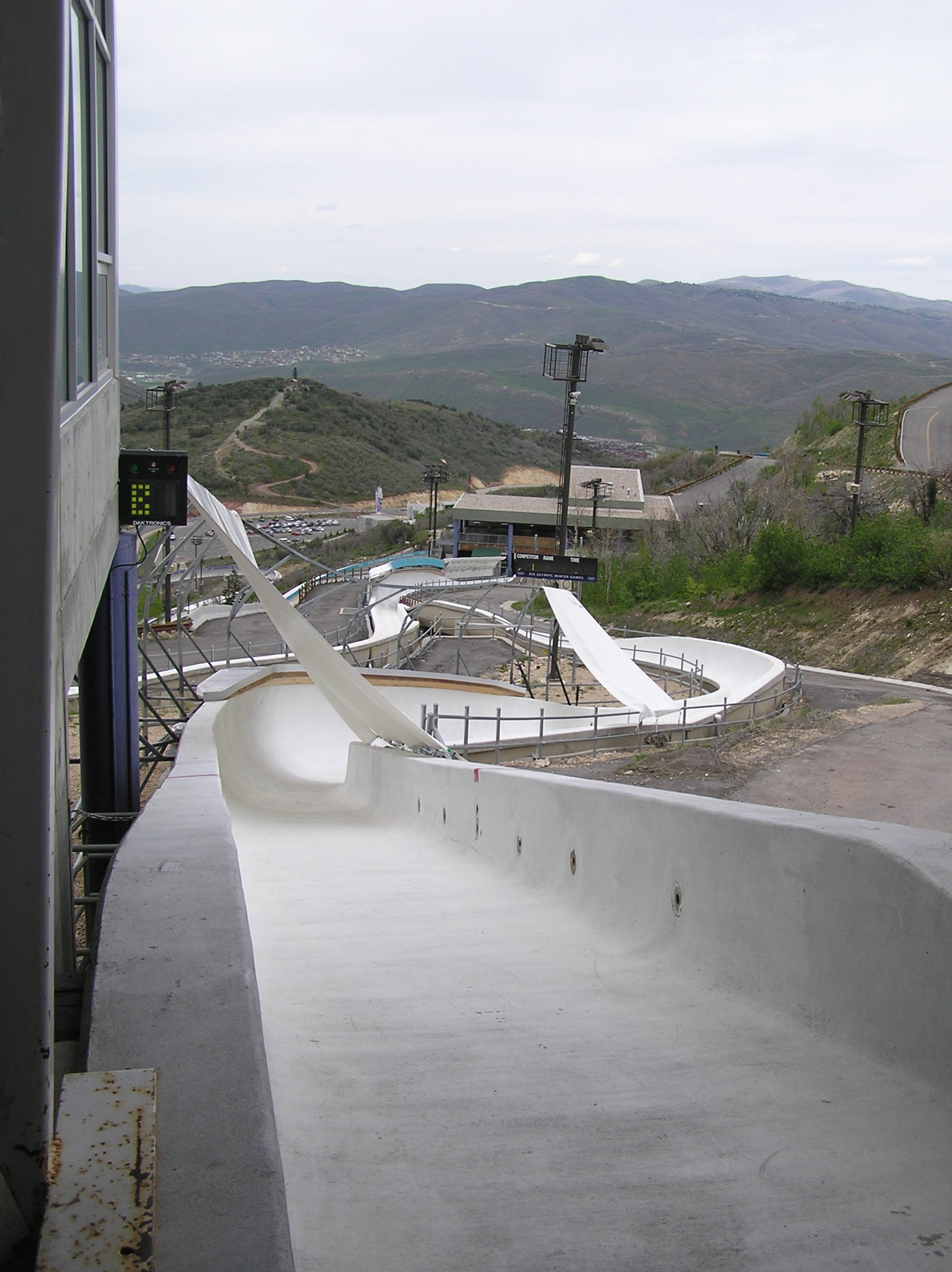
The Utah Olympic Park Track hosted luge at the 2002 Winter Olympics in Salt Lake City and will do so again in 2034.

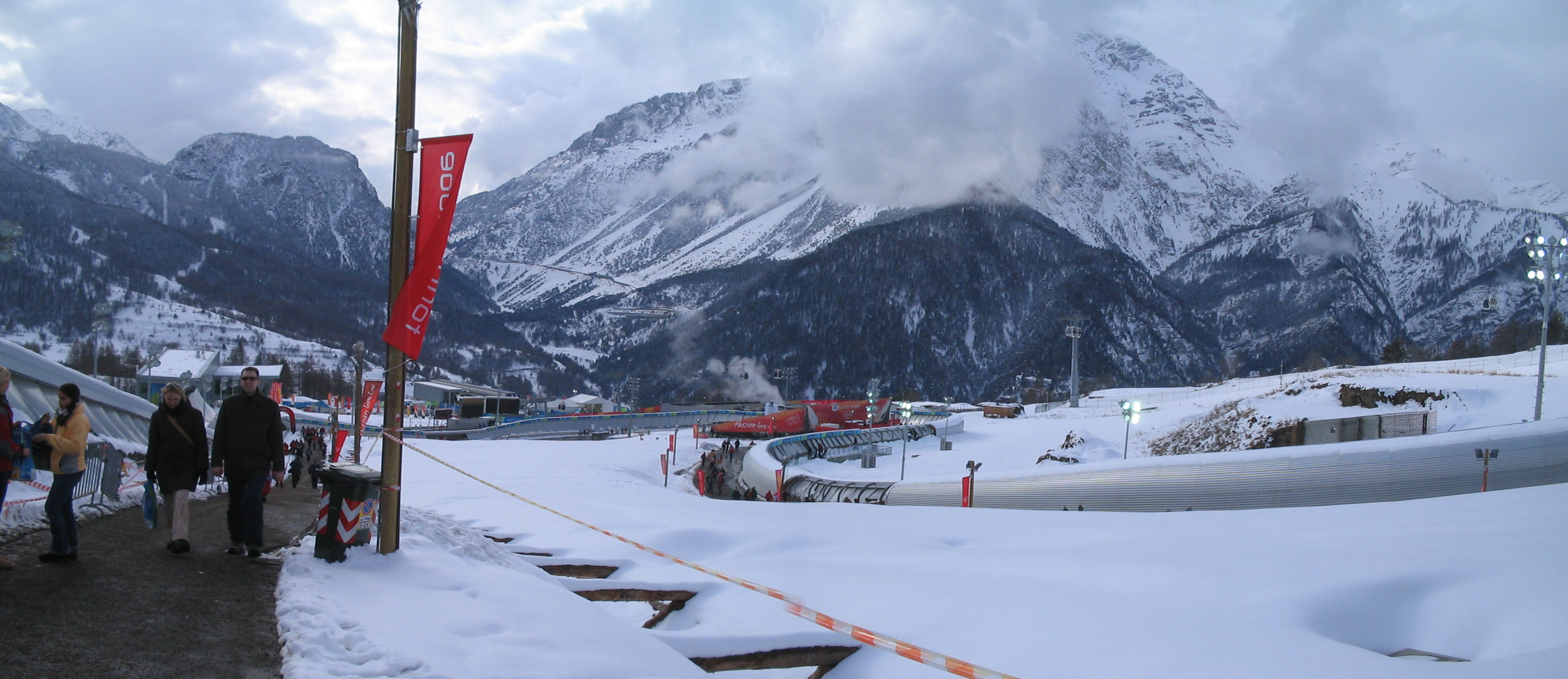
Cesana Pariol hosted luge at the 2006 Winter Olympics in Turin.

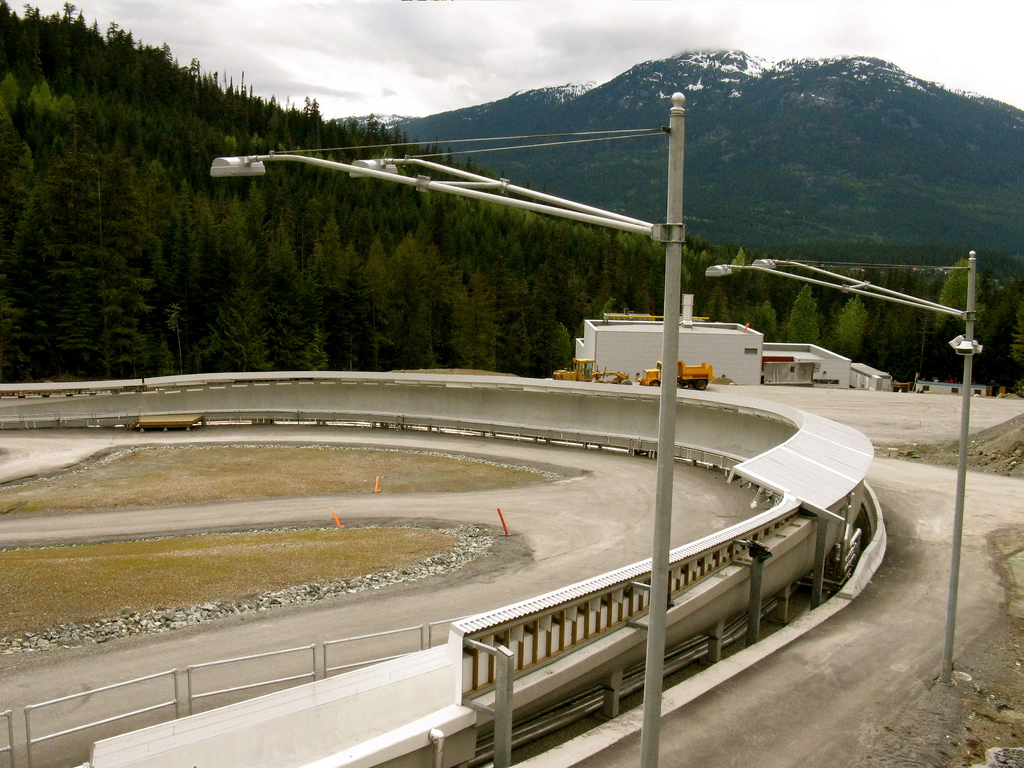
The Whistler Sliding Centre hosted luge at the 2010 Winter Olympics in Vancouver.

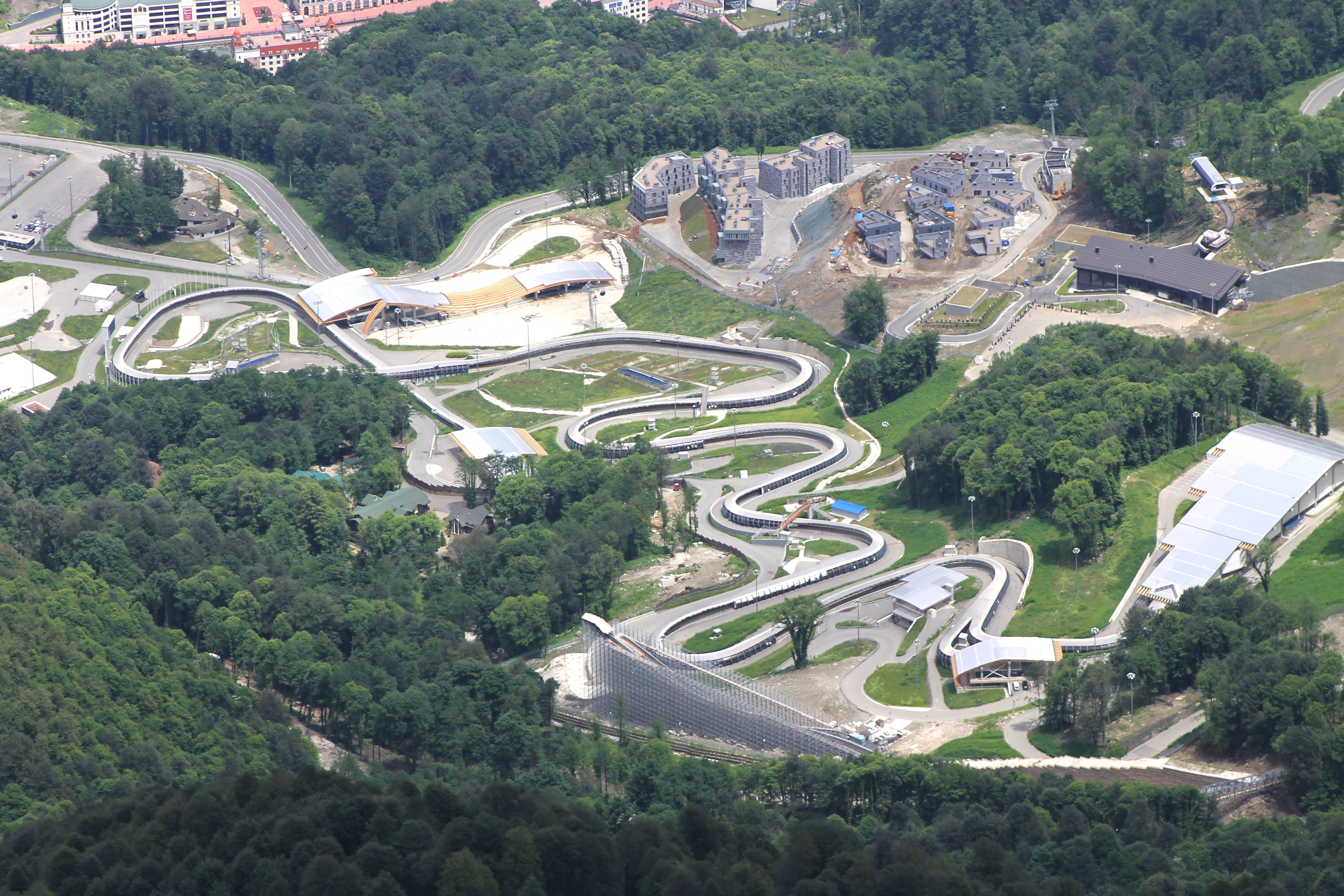
Sliding Center Sanki hosted luge at the 2014 Winter Olympics in Sochi.

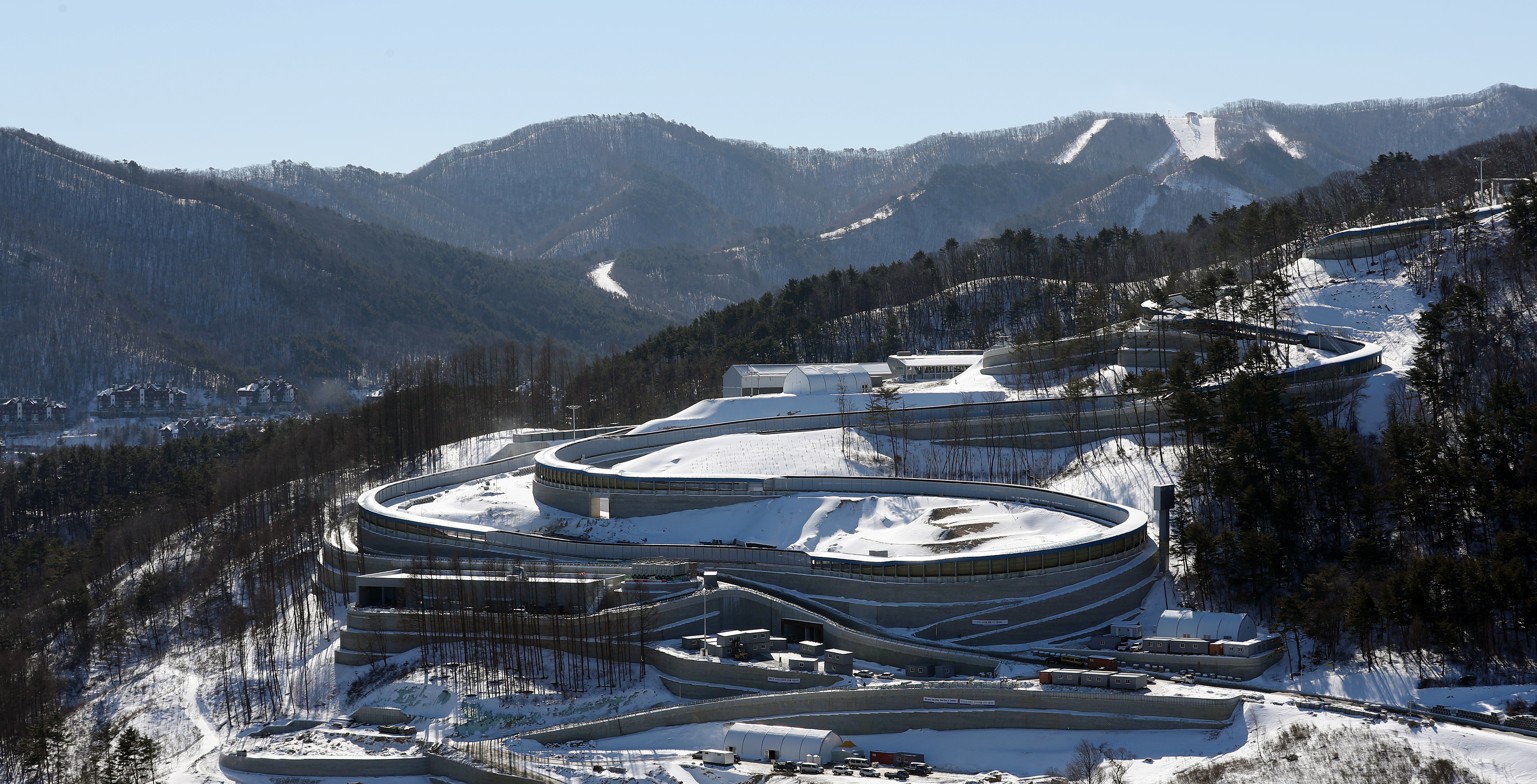
The Olympic Sliding Centre hosted luge at the 2018 Winter Olympics in Pyeongchang.

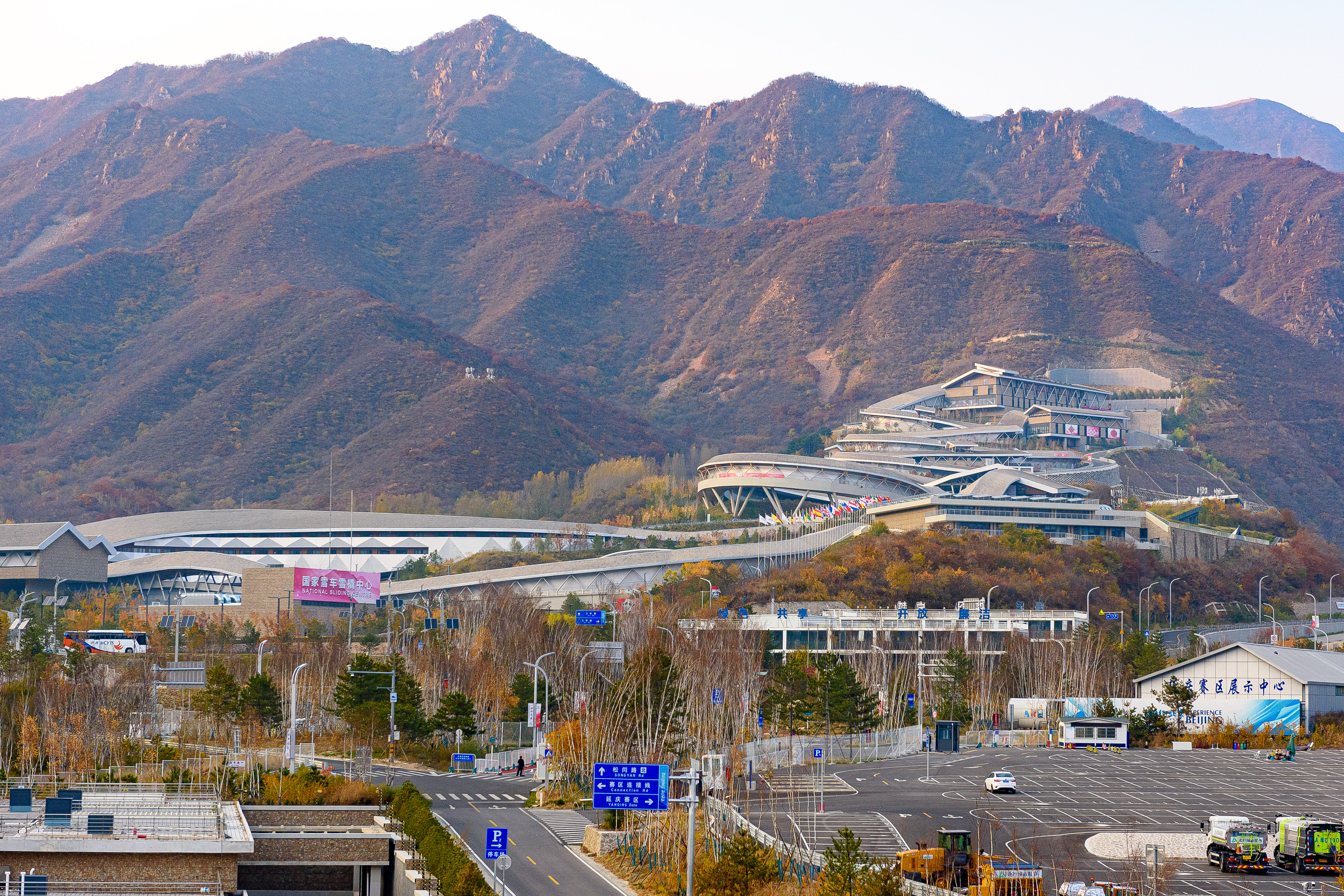
Yanqing National Sliding Centre hosted luge at the 2022 Winter Olympics in Beijing.

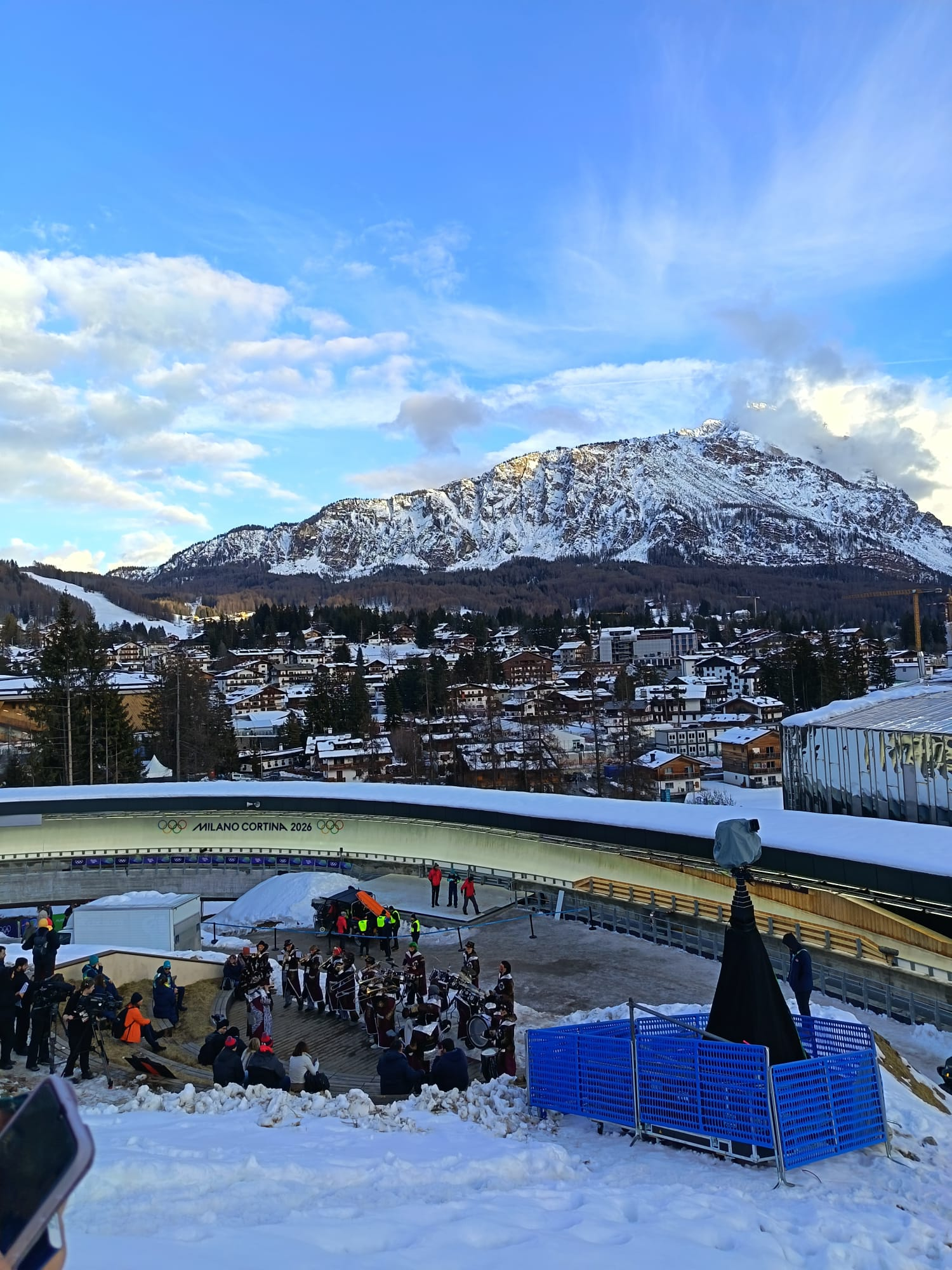
The Cortina Sliding Centre hosted luge at the 2026 Winter Olympics in Cortina d’Ampezzo.
