= Bobsleigh at the 1976 Winter Olympics – Two-man =

Two-man at the XII Olympic Winter Games
- Venue: Olympic Sliding Centre Innsbruck
- Dates: 6–7 February 1976
- Competitors: 48 from 13 nations
- Winning time: 3:44.42

Medalists
1st place, gold medalist(s)		Meinhard Nehmer, Bernhard Germeshausen	East Germany
2nd place, silver medalist(s)		Wolfgang Zimmerer, Manfred Schumann	West Germany
3rd place, bronze medalist(s)		Erich Schärer, Sepp Benz	Switzerland

The Two-man bobsleigh competition at the 1976 Winter Olympics in Innsbruck was held on 6 and 7 February, at Olympic Sliding Centre Innsbruck.

== Results ==
Rank	Country	Athletes	Run 1	Run 2	Run 3	Run 4	Total
1st place, gold medalist(s)	East Germany (GDR-2)	Meinhard Nehmer; Bernhard Germeshausen	56.24	56.04	55.87	56.27	3:44.42
2nd place, silver medalist(s)	West Germany (FRG-1)	Wolfgang Zimmerer; Manfred Schumann	56.09	56.31	56.26	56.33	3:44.99
3rd place, bronze medalist(s)	Switzerland (SUI-1)	Erich Schärer; Sepp Benz	56.43	56.53	56.33	56.41	3:45.70
4	Austria (AUT-2)	Fritz Sperling; Andreas Schwab	56.06	56.19	56.73	56.76	3:45.74
5	West Germany (FRG-2)	Georg Heibl; Fritz Ohlwärter	56.36	56.43	56.59	56.75	3:46.13
6	Austria (AUT-1)	Dieter Delle Karth; Franz Köfel	56.52	56.76	56.47	56.62	3:46.37
7	East Germany (GDR-1)	Horst Schönau; Raimund Bethge	56.89	56.79	56.74	56.55	3:46.97
8	Italy (ITA-1)	Giorgio Alverà; Franco Perruquet	56.62	56.71	56.84	57.13	3:47.30
9	Sweden	Carl-Erik Eriksson; Kenth Rönn	57.09	57.20	57.16	56.96	3:48.41
10	Switzerland (SUI-2)	Fritz Lüdi; Thomas Hagen	56.95	57.32	57.35	57.48	3:49.10
11	Romania (ROU-1)	Ion Panţuru; Gheorghe Lixandru	57.15	57.43	57.85	57.66	3:50.09
12	Romania (ROU-2)	Dragoș Panaitescu-Rapan; Costel Ionescu	57.95	57.66	57.58	57.34	3:50.53
13	France (FRA-2)	Alain Roy; Serge Hissung	57.58	57.43	57.58	57.95	3:50.54
14	United States (USA-1)	Jimmy Morgan; Thomas Becker	57.68	57.63	57.66	57.79	3:50.76
15	France (FRA-1)	Gérard Christaud-Pipola; Michel Lemarchand	57.43	57.73	57.78	58.08	3:51.02
16	Italy (ITA-2)	Nevio De Zordo; Ezio Fiori	57.71	57.58	57.88	57.95	3:51.12
17	Czechoslovakia	Jiří Paulát; Václav Sůva	57.78	57.74	57.97	58.22	3:51.71
18	Canada (CAN-1)	Colin Nelson; Jim Lavalley	57.56	57.92	58.13	58.39	3:52.00
19	United States (USA-2)	Brent Rushlaw; John Proctor	58.07	58.27	57.79	57.89	3:52.02
20	Great Britain (GBR-1)	Jackie Price; Gomer Lloyd	58.05	58.13	57.90	58.02	3:52.10
21	Great Britain (GBR-2)	Mark Agar; Michael Sweet	58.40	58.33	57.90	58.08	3:52.71
22	Japan (JPN-2)	Rikio Sato; Kimihiro Shinada	58.52	58.30	58.55	58.35	3:53.72
23	Canada (CAN-2)	Joey Kilburn; Brian Vachon	58.61	58.74	58.22	58.72	3:54.29
24	Japan (JPN-1)	Susumu Esashika; Kazumi Abe	58.69	59.07	59.12	59.18	3:56.06
