= Herbert Berg =

Herbert Berg may refer to:

- Herbert Berg (bobsleigh), West German bobsledder who competed in the late 1970s
- Herbert Berg (scholar), religious studies professor at the University of North Carolina Wilmington
- Herbert Berg (racing driver), German racing driver who participated in the 1938 Grand Prix season
