= Antonio Brancaccio =

Antonio Brancaccio may refer to:

- Antonio Brancaccio (judge)
- Antonio Brancaccio (bishop)
- Antonio Brancaccio (bobsledder)
