= Athletics at the 1975 Summer Universiade – Men's decathlon =

The men's decathlon event at the 1975 Summer Universiade was held at the Stadio Olimpico in Rome on 18 and 19 September.

== Results ==
The highest mark recorded in each event is highlighted in yellow

Rank	Athlete	Nationality	100m	LJ	SP	HJ	400m	110m H	DT	PV	JT	1500m	Points	Notes
1st place, gold medalist(s)	Sepp Zeilbauer	Austria	11.31	7.06	14.89	2.02	50.43	15.27	42.14	4.70	60.16	4:34.61	7854	
2nd place, silver medalist(s)	Philippe Bobin	France	11.18	7.18	13.31	1.95	50.98	15.16	39.70	4.80	56.56	4:51.72	7567	
3rd place, bronze medalist(s)	Winfried Hartweck	West Germany	11.38	6.79	12.92	1.86	50.39	16.24	41.48	4.40	62.28	4:32.76	7382	
4	Alexander Wernsdorfer	West Germany	11.18	6.97	13.10	1.89	49.50	15.39	39.74	4.00	49.36	4:40.19	7276	
5	Georg Werthner	Austria	11.72	7.06	12.11	1.86	51.94	15.76	34.18	4.40	63.92	4:37.38	7128	
6	Vladimir Buryakov	Soviet Union	11.49	6.64	13.25	1.89	50.21	15.56	34.48	4.00	58.90	4:42.58	7099	
7	Giovanni Modena	Italy	11.29	7.24	11.33	1.92	50.62	15.74	35.68	4.10	53.20	4:48.14	7077	
8	Paul Morand	Switzerland	11.63	6.70	12.29	1.89	50.70	15.85	36.54	4.10	45.84	4:44.25	6853	
9	Cesare Barberi	Italy											6650	
10	Prapant Srisathorn	Thailand											5636	
11	Rafael Echavarría	Mexico											5619	
	Michel Pradet	France	11.88	6.66	NM	1.89	DNF	DNS	–	–	–	–	DNF	
	Eduardo Rodríguez	Spain	11.46	NM	12.00	1.89	DNS	–	–	–	–	–	DNF	
	Marek Cisowski	Poland											DNF	
