= Joachim Ernst =

Joachim Ernst may refer to:

- Joachim Ernest, Prince of Anhalt (1536–1586), ruler of the Principality of Anhalt
- Joachim Ernst, Duke of Anhalt (1901–1947), last ruler of the Duchy of Anhalt
- Joachim Ernst, Margrave of Brandenburg-Ansbach (1583–1625), German nobleman
- Joachim Ernst (ski jumper), German former ski jumper, father to Gianina Ernst
