= Gianina Ernst =

German ski jumper (born 1998)

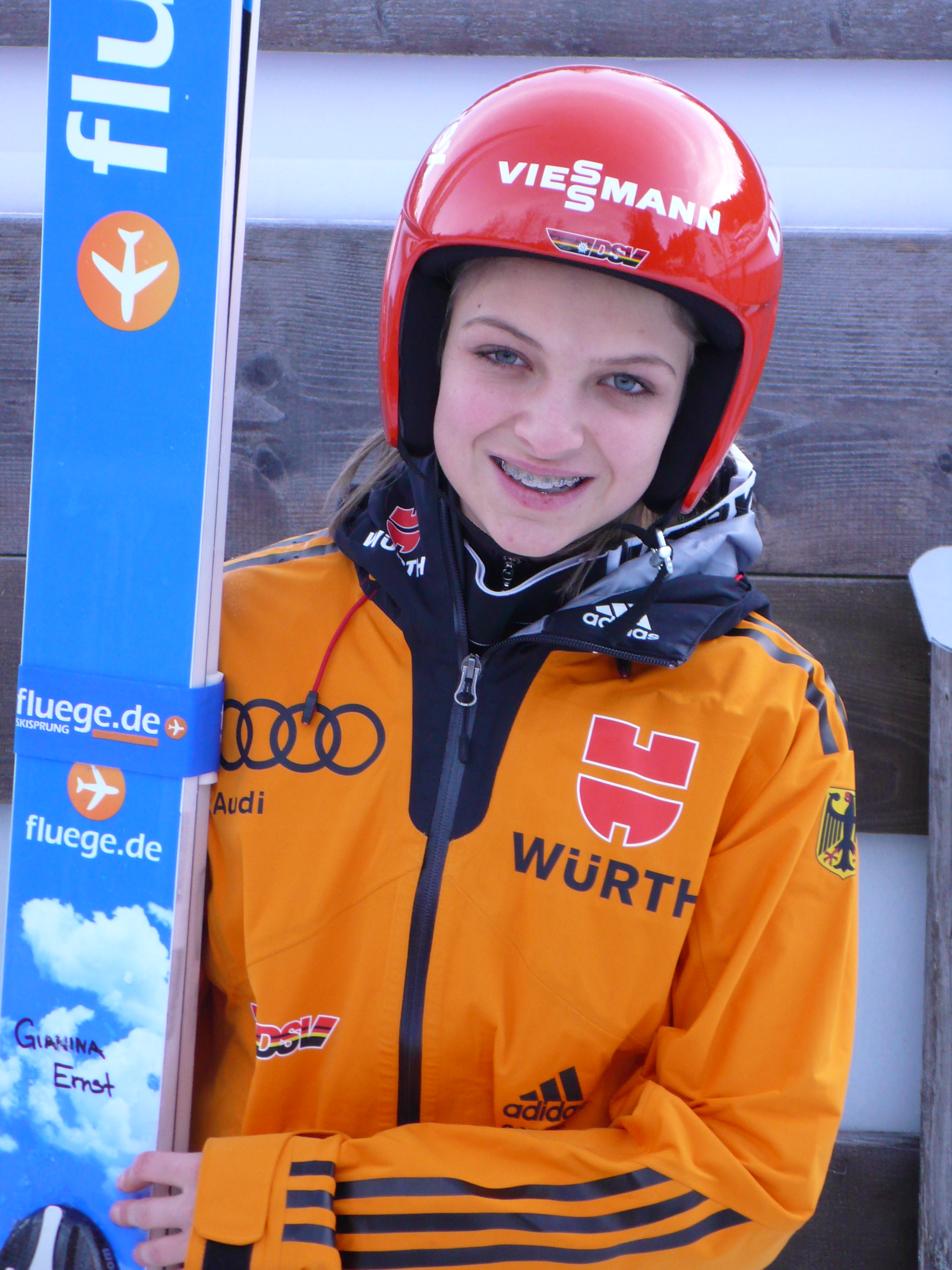
- Ernst in December 2013
- Born: 31 December 1998 (age 27); Winterthur, Switzerland
- Known for: Youngest participant during the 2014 Winter Olympics

Gianina Krucker (née Ernst; born 31 December 1998) is a German former ski jumper. She was the youngest participant during the 2014 Winter Olympics.

== Personal life ==
Gianina Ernst was born in Winterthur, Switzerland, to a German-Swiss family. Her father, Joachim Ernst, was a ski jumper and German champion who, during FIS Nordic World Ski Championships 1982 in Oslo, finished 11th on the K70 hill and 38th on the K90 hill. Her mother, Cornelia Thomas, was a Swiss cross country skier, who represented Switzerland at the 1980 Winter Olympics and the 1982 World Championships.

Gianina has five siblings. Her brother, Benjamin Ernst (born 21 March 1995), is also a ski jumper.

== Career ==
Ernst's debut in the FIS Ski Jumping World Cup took place in December 2013 in Lillehammer, where she had already won a second place medal in a previous competition.

She was the youngest participant during the 2014 Winter Olympics when a Women's Ski Jump competition was hosted for the first time in the history of the Winter Olympic Games. In 2020 she announced her retirement from the sport.
