= Hansjörg Trachsel =

Swiss politician and bobsledder (born 1948)

Medal record

Bobsleigh

World Championships
Silver medal – second place	1977 St. Moritz	Two-man
Bronze medal – third place	1979 Königssee	Four-man

Hansjörg Trachsel (born 30 August 1948) is a Swiss politician and former bobsledder who competed in the late 1970s.

Trachsel won two medals at the FIBT World Championships with a silver in the two-man event (1977) and a bronze in the four-man event (1979). Trachsel served as an officer in the international governing body of the sport, the Federation Internationale de Bobsleigh and Toboggan (FIBT), where he oversaw the construction and renovation of several bobsled venues. A civil engineer by trade, he insured the required specifications, quality and schedule for sliding sport venues, including the Olympic tracks in Park City, Utah and Lake Placid, New York, and he provided early engineering guidance for the design of the Olympic track at Whistler Mountain for the 2010 Olympic Winter Games. He resigned his role with the FIBT when he was elected to a political office in 2004.

From 1984 to 2004, he was a member of the cantonal parliament, the legislative council of the canton of Grisons, serving as President in 2000.

Elected in September 2004 to the Government of the canton of Grisons, Trachsel served a full 10-year tenure as the head of Economic and Social affairs. He served as President in 2009 and 2013, and Vice President in 2008 and 2012. At the 2008 election of Eveline Widmer-Schlumpf to the Federal Council of the Swiss People's Party (SVP) of the Canton of Grisons, a new political party—the Conservative Democratic Party (BDP) Graubünden—emerged. Trachsel moved to the BDP along with several colleagues and went on to be successful in the 2010 elections despite the party change. He served his final 4-year term until 31 December 2014 when he fulfilled the 10 year limit of service. Trachsel retired from Government service in December 2014 and received a standing ovation from his colleagues at his retirement ceremony in Chur, Switzerland.

In his position as the head of the Department of Economic and Social Affairs of the Canton of Grisons, Government Councillor Hansjörg Trachsel has served on the World Economic Forum (WEF) committee. The committee is tasked with processing all issues involving the World Economic Forum, cooperating with all its partners, making any necessary decisions as well as drafting fundamental decisions for the entire government. The WEF Committee is also the point-of-contact for the press and information distribution.

In January 2015 it was announced that Trachsel would serve as President of Innozet, an incubator for technology start-up companies. He also serves on the Board of Engadin Skimarathon as well as other sports organizations.
