= Georg Großmann =

German bobsledder

Personal information
- Nationality: German
- Born: 2 April 1940 (age 84); Säckingen, Germany

Sport
- Sport: Bobsleigh

Georg Großmann (born 2 April 1940) is a German bobsledder. He competed in the two man event at the 1980 Winter Olympics.
