= FIBT World Championships 1979 =

Winter sport competition

1979 World Championships
- Location: Königssee, West Germany

The FIBT World Championships 1979 took place in Königssee, West Germany. It was the first championships that took place on an artificially refrigerated track. The track also hosted the luge world championships that same year, the first time that had ever happened in both bobsleigh and luge in a non-Winter Olympic year (Igls hosted both events for the 1976 games in neighboring Innsbruck.).

== Two man bobsleigh ==
Pos	Team	Time
Gold	Switzerland (Erich Schärer, Josef Benz)	
Silver	West Germany (Stefan Gaisreiter, Manfred Schumann, Fritz Ohlwärter)	
Bronze	West Germany (Toni Mangold, Stefan Späte)	

Ohlwärter replaced the injured Schumann after the third heat of this event.

== Four man bobsleigh ==
Pos	Team	Time
Gold	West Germany (Stefan Gaisreiter, Dieter Gebard, Hans Wagner, Heinz Busche)	
Silver	East Germany (Meinhard Nehmer, Detlef Richter, Bernhard Germeshausen, Hans-Jürgen Gerhardt)	
Bronze	Switzerland (Erich Schärer, Ulrich Bächli, Hansjörg Trachsel, Josef Benz)	

== Medal table ==
Rank	Nation	Gold	Silver	Bronze	Total
1	West Germany (FRG)	1	1	1	3
2	Switzerland (SUI)	1	0	1	2
3	East Germany (GDR)	0	1	0	1
Totals (3 entries)		2	2	2	6
