= FIBT World Championships 1977 =

Winter sport competition

1977 World Championships
- Location: St. Moritz, Switzerland

The FIBT World Championships 1977 took place in St. Moritz, Switzerland for the record thirteenth time. The Swiss city had hosted the event previously in 1931 (Four-man), 1935 (Four-man), 1937 (Four-man), 1938 (Two-man), 1939 (Two-man), 1947, 1955, 1957, 1959, 1965, 1970, and 1974.

== Two man bobsleigh ==
Pos	Team	Time
Gold	Switzerland (Hans Hiltebrand, Heinz Meier)	
Silver	Switzerland (Fritz Lüdi, Hansjörg Trachsel)	
Bronze	West Germany (Stefan Gaisreiter, Manfred Schumann)	

== Four man bobsleigh ==
Pos	Team	Time
Gold	East Germany (Meinhard Nehmer, Bernhard Germeshausen, Hans-Jürgen Gerhardt, Raimund Bethge)	
Silver	Switzerland (Erich Schärer, Ulrich Bächli, Rudolf Marti, Josef Benz)	
Bronze	West Germany (Jakob Resch, Herbert Berg, Fritz Ohlwärter, Walter Barfuss)	

The East Germans earned their first medal at this championship.

== Medal table ==
Rank	Nation	Gold	Silver	Bronze	Total
1	Switzerland (SUI)	1	2	0	3
2	East Germany (GDR)	1	0	0	1
3	West Germany (FRG)	0	0	2	2
Totals (3 entries)		2	2	2	6
