= Heinz Meier (bobsledder) =

Swiss bobsledder

Medal record

Bobsleigh

World Championships
Gold medal – first place	1977 St. Moritz	Two-man

Heinz Meier is a Swiss bobsledder who competed in the late 1970s. He won a gold medal in the two-man event at the 1977 FIBT World Championships in St. Moritz.
