= Jakob Resch =

German bobsledder

Medal record

Men's Bobsleigh

Representing West Germany

World Championships
Bronze medal – third place	1977 St. Moritz	Four-man
Bronze medal – third place	1978 Lake Placid	Two-man

Jakob Resch is a West German bobsledder who competed in the late 1970s. He won two bronze medals at the FIBT World Championships (Two-man: 1978, Four-man: 1977).

Resch now operates the Hindenburglinde hotel, located in Ramsau bei Berchtesgaden, Germany.
