= Yoshimitsu Kadowaki =

Japanese bobsledder (born 1953)

Personal information
- Nationality: Japanese
- Born: 3 July 1953 (age 71); Hokkaido, Japan

Sport
- Sport: Bobsleigh

Yoshimitsu Kadowaki (門脇 慶充, Kadowaki Yoshimitsu, born 3 July 1953) is a Japanese bobsledder. He competed in the two man event at the 1980 Winter Olympics.
