= Josef Oberhauser (bobsleigh) =

Austrian bobsledder

Medal record

Bobsleigh

World Championships
Bronze medal – third place	1971 Cervinia	Two-man

Josef Oberhauser (born 23 February 1949) is an Austrian bobsledder who competed in the early 1970s. He won a bronze medal in the two-man event at the 1971 FIBT World Championships in Cervinia.

Oberhauser also finished eighth in the two-man event at the 1972 Winter Olympics in Sapporo.
