= Dieter Delle Karth =

Austrian bobsledder

Personal information
- Nationality: Austrian
- Born: 30 March 1944 (age 81) Tyrol, Nazi Germany

Sport
- Sport: Bobsleigh

Dieter Delle Karth (born 30 March 1944) is an Austrian bobsledder. He competed in the two man event at the 1976 Winter Olympics.
