= Walter Barfuss =

German bobsledder

Medal record

Men's Bobsleigh

Representing West Germany

World Championships
Bronze medal – third place	1977 St. Moritz	Four-man
Bronze medal – third place	1978 Lake Placid	Two-man

Walter Barfuss (4 February 1955 – 24 July 1999) was a West German bobsledder who competed in the late 1970s. He won two bronze medals at the FIBT World Championships (Two-man: 1978, Four-man: 1977). Barfuss also finished seventh in the four-man event at the 1980 Winter Olympics in Lake Placid, New York.
