= Michel Lemarchand =

French bobsledder

Personal information
- Nationality: French
- Born: 13 April 1946 (age 78)

Sport
- Sport: Bobsleigh

Michel Lemarchand (born 13 April 1946) is a French bobsledder. He competed in the two man event at the 1976 Winter Olympics.
