= Giuseppe Soravia =

Italian bobsledder (1948–1980)

Personal information
- Nationality: Italian
- Born: 23 January 1948
- Died: 26 November 1980 (aged 32); Innsbruck, Austria

Sport
- Sport: Bobsleigh

Giuseppe Soravia (23 January 1948 – 26 November 1980) was an Italian bobsledder. He competed in the two man event at the 1980 Winter Olympics. In 1980, he suffered a skull fracture while training and died of his injuries at hospital.
