= Franz Weinberger =

Swiss bobsledder

Medal record

Bobsleigh

World Championships
Silver medal – second place	1981 Cortina d'Ampezzo	Four-man

Franz Weinberger is a Swiss bobsledder who competed in the early 1980s. He won a silver medal in the four-man event at the 1981 FIBT World Championships in Cortina d'Ampezzo.
