= Corrado dal Fabbro =

Italian bobsledder (1945–2018)

Medal record

Bobsleigh

Olympic Games
Silver medal – second place	1972 Sapporo	Four-man

World Championships
Silver medal – second place	1971 Cervinia	Two-man

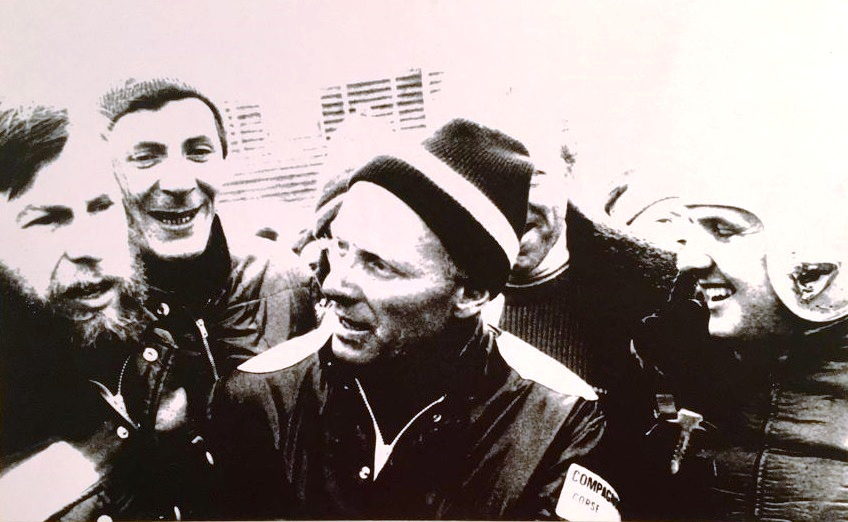
Corrado dal Fabbro with Eugenio Monti and Enzo Vicario

Corrado dal Fabbro (sometimes rendered as Corrado Dal Fabbro or Corado dal Fabro; 4 August 1945 – 29 March 2018) was an Italian bobsledder who competed in the late 1960s and early 1970s. He won the silver medal in the four-man event at the 1972 Winter Olympics in Sapporo.

Dal Fabbro also won a silver medal in the two-man event at the 1971 FIBT World Championships in Cervinia.

From 2007 until his death in 2018, he was vice president of Sport for the FIBT.
