= FIBT World Championships 1981 =

Winter sport competition

1981 World Championships
- Location: Cortina d'Ampezzo, Italy

The FIBT World Championships 1981 took place in Cortina d'Ampezzo, Italy for the seventh time, having hosted the event previously in 1937 (Two-man), 1939 (Four-man), 1950, 1954, 1960, and 1966.

Following the death of West Germany's Toni Pensperger at the track in 1966, numerous safety improvements were done at the track which were satisfactory enough for the FIBT to allow the championships to be hosted. These improvements would not be enough as American bobsled driver James Morgan was killed during the third run of the four-man event.

A stuntman fatality on the track a week later, during the first day of filming of For Your Eyes Only, led track officials to shorten the track to its current configuration. Cortina did not host another championship until 1989.

== Two man bobsleigh ==
Pos	Team	Time
Gold	East Germany (Bernhard Germeshausen, Hans-Jürgen Gerhardt)	
Silver	East Germany (Horst Schönau, Andreas Kirchner)	
Bronze	Switzerland (Erich Schärer, Josef Benz)	

== Four man bobsleigh ==
February 8, 1981

Pos	Team	Time
Gold	East Germany (Bernhard Germeshausen, Hans-Jürgen Gerhardt, Henry Gerlach, Michael Trübner)	
Silver	Switzerland (Hans Hiltebrand, Kurt Poletti, Franz Weinberger, Franz Isenegger)	
Bronze	Switzerland (Erich Schärer, Max Rüegg, Tony Rüegg, Josef Benz)	

== Medal table ==
Rank	Nation	Gold	Silver	Bronze	Total
1	East Germany (GDR)	2	1	0	3
2	Switzerland (SUI)	0	1	2	3
Totals (2 entries)		2	2	2	6
