= Michael Trübner =

East German bobsledder

Medal record

Men's Bobsleigh

Representing East Germany

World Championships
Gold medal – first place	1981 Cortina d'Ampezzo	Four-man

Michael Trübner is an East German bobsledder who competed in the early 1980s. He won the gold medal in the four-man event at the 1981 FIBT World Championships in Cortina d'Ampezzo.
