= Stefan Gaisreiter =

German bobsledder

Medal record

Men's bobsleigh

Representing West Germany

Olympic Games
Bronze medal – third place	1972 Sapporo	Four-man

World Championships
Gold medal – first place	1969 Lake Placid	Four-man
Gold medal – first place	1979 Königssee	Four-man
Silver medal – second place	1979 Königssee	Two-man
Bronze medal – third place	1971 Cervinia	Four-man
Bronze medal – third place	1973 Lake Placid	Four-man
Bronze medal – third place	1977 St. Moritz	Two-man

European Championships
Gold medal – first place	1970 Cortina d'Ampezzo	Four-man

Stefan Gaisreiter (born 10 December 1947 in Murnau am Staffelsee) is a West German bobsledder who competed from the late 1960s to the late 1970s. He won a bronze medal in the four-man event at the 1972 Winter Olympics in Sapporo.

Gaisreiter also won six medals at the FIBT World Championships with two golds (Four-man: 1969, 1979), one silver (Two-man: 1979), and three bronzes (Two-man: 1977, Four-man: 1971, 1973).
