= Dieter Gebard =

West German bobsledder

Medal record

Men's Bobsleigh

Representing West Germany

World Championships
Gold medal – first place	1979 Königssee	Four-man

Dieter Gebard is a West German bobsledder who competed in the late 1970s. He won the gold medal in the four-man event at the 1979 FIBT World Championships in Königssee.
