= Toni Mangold =

German bobsledder

Medal record

Men's Bobsleigh

Representing West Germany

World Championships
Bronze medal – third place	1979 Königssee	Two-man

Toni Mangold is a West German bobsledder who competed in the late 1970s. He won a bronze medal in the two-man event at the 1979 FIBT World Championships in Königssee.
