= Alessandro Bignozzi =

Italian bobsledder (born 1944)

Medal record

Bobsleigh

Representing Italy

World Championships
| Silver medal – second place | 1971 Cervinia | Four-man |

Alessandro Bignozzi (born 11 January 1944) is an Italian bobsledder who competed in the early 1970s. He won a silver medal in the four-man event at the 1971 FIBT World Championships in Cervinia.
