= Stefan Späte =

German bobsledder

Medal record

Men's Bobsleigh

Representing West Germany

World Championships
| Bronze medal – third place | 1979 Königssee | Two-man |

Stefan Späte is a West German bobsledder who competed in the late 1970s. He won a bronze medal in the two-man event at the 1979 FIBT World Championships in Königssee.
