= Enzo Vicario =

Italian bobsledder (born 1942)

Medal record

Bobsleigh

World Championships
Silver medal – second place	1971 Cervinia	Two-man

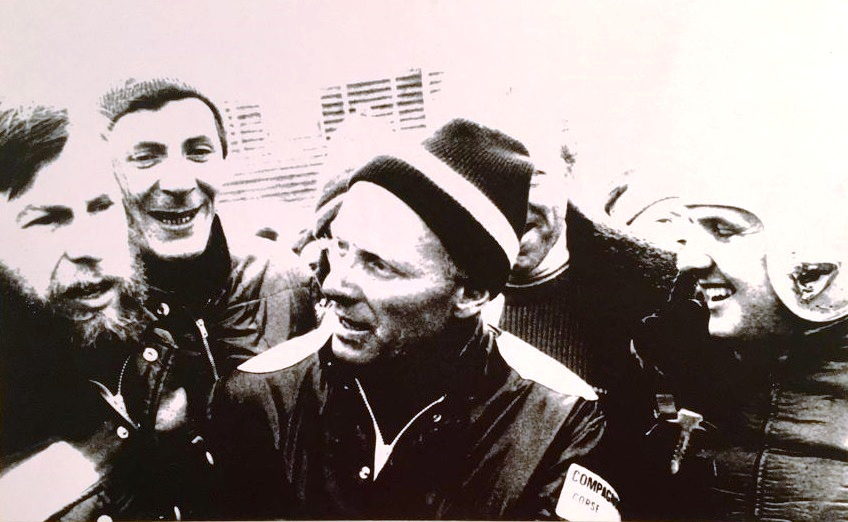
Enzo Vicario with Eugenio Monti and Corrado dal Fabbro

Enzo Vicario (5 July 1942) is an Italian bobsledder who competed in the early 1970s. He won a silver medal in the two-man event at the 1971 FIBT World Championships in Cervinia.

Vicario also finished tenth in the two-man event at the 1972 Winter Olympics in Sapporo.
