= Kurt Poletti =

Swiss bobsledder (born 1960)

Medal record

Bobsleigh

World Championships
| Gold medal – first place | 1983 Lake Placid | Four-man |
| Silver medal – second place | 1981 Cortina d'Ampezzo | Four-man |

Kurt Poletti (born 23 April 1960) is a Swiss bobsleigher who competed in the early 1980s. He won two medals in the four-man event at the FIBT World Championships with a gold in 1983 and a silver in 1981.

Poletti also finished fourth in the four-man event at the 1984 Winter Olympics in Sarajevo.
