= Harald Seifert =

East German bobsledder

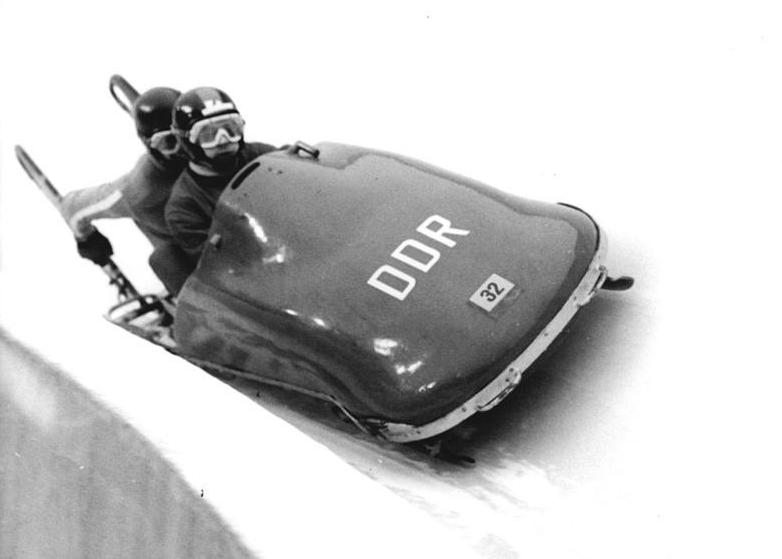
- Seifert behind Horst Schönau in 1977.

Personal information
- Born: September 20, 1953 (age 73)
Medal record
Men's Bobsleigh
Representing East Germany
World Championships
Gold medal – first place	1978 Lake Placid	Four-man

Harald Seifert (born 20 September 1953) is an East German bobsledder who competed in the late 1970s. He won a gold medal in the four-man event at the 1978 FIBT World Championships in Lake Placid.

Seifert also finished fourth in the four-man event at the 1976 Winter Olympics in Innsbruck.
