= Roger Potter (bobsleigh) =

British bobsledder

Personal information
- Nationality: British
- Born: 13 May 1945 (age 79); London, England

Sport
- Sport: Bobsleigh

Roger Potter (born 13 May 1945) is a British bobsledder. He competed in the two man event at the 1980 Winter Olympics.
