= Oscar d'Andrea =

Italian bobsledder

Medal record

Bobsleigh

World Championships
Silver medal – second place	1971 Cervinia	Four-man

Oscar d'Andrea is an Italian bobsledder who competed in the early 1970s. He won a silver medal in the four-man event at the 1971 FIBT World Championships in Cervinia.
