= Hans Wagner (bobsleigh) =

German bobsledder (1949–2026)

Medal record

Men's Bobsleigh

Representing West Germany

World Championships
Gold medal – first place	1979 Königssee	Four-man

Hans Wagner (6 October 1949 – 14 April 2026) was a West German bobsledder, born in Neubeuern, who competed in the late 1970s. He won the gold medal in the four-man event at the 1979 FIBT World Championships in Königssee.

Wagner also finished seventh in the four-man event at the 1980 Winter Olympics in Lake Placid, New York.

He died in Rosenheim on 14 April 2026, at the age of 76.

== Sources ==
- Bobsleigh four-man world championship medalists since 1930
- Wallenchinsky, David (1984). "Bobsled: Four-man". In The Complete Book of the Olympics: 1896 - 1980. New York: Penguin Books. p. 562.
