= FIBT World Championships 1971 =

Winter sport championship held in 1971

1971 World Championships
- Location: Cervinia, Italy

The FIBT World Championships 1971 took place in Cervinia, Italy.

== Two man bobsleigh ==
Pos	Team	Time
Gold	Italy (Gianfranco Gaspari, Mario Armano)	
Silver	Italy (Enzo Vicario, Corrado Dal Fabbro)	
Bronze	Austria (Herbert Gruber, Josef Oberhauser)	

== Four man bobsleigh ==
Pos	Team	Time
Gold	Switzerland (René Stadler, Max Forster, Erich Schärer, Peter Schärer)	
Silver	Italy (Oscar d'Andrea, Alessandro Bignozzi, Antonio Brancaccio, Renzo Caldara)	
Bronze	West Germany (Wolfgang Zimmerer, Stefan Gaisreiter, Walter Steinbauer, Peter Utzschneider)	

== Medal table ==
Rank	Nation	Gold	Silver	Bronze	Total
1	Italy (ITA)	1	2	0	3
2	Switzerland (SUI)	1	0	0	1
3	Austria (AUT)	0	0	1	1
3	West Germany (FRG)	0	0	1	1
Totals (4 entries)		2	2	2	6
