= Alexander Wernsdorfer =

German bobsledder

Personal information
- Nationality: German
- Born: 12 February 1951 (age 75) Aschaffenburg, West Germany

Sport
- Sport: Bobsleigh

Alexander Wernsdorfer (born 12 February 1951) is a German bobsledder. He competed in the two man event at the 1980 Winter Olympics.
