= Meinhard Nehmer =

East German bobsledder (born 1941)

Medal record

Men's bobsleigh

Representing East Germany

Olympic Games
| Gold medal – first place | 1976 Innsbruck | Two-man |
| Gold medal – first place | 1976 Innsbruck | Four-man |
| Gold medal – first place | 1980 Lake Placid | Four-man |
| Bronze medal – third place | 1980 Lake Placid | Two-man |

World Championships
| Gold medal – first place | 1977 St. Moritz | Four-man |
| Silver medal – second place | 1978 Lake Placid | Two-man |
| Silver medal – second place | 1979 Königssee | Four-man |
| Bronze medal – third place | 1978 Lake Placid | Four-man |

Meinhard Nehmer (born 13 January 1941 in Boblin near Pölitz, Pomerania) is a former East German bobsledder who competed from the mid-1970s to the early 1980s. Competing in two Winter Olympics, he won four medals with three golds (Two-man: 1976, Four-man: 1976, 1980) and one bronze (Two-man: 1980). Nehmer also carried the East German flag during the opening ceremonies of the 1976 Winter Olympics in Innsbruck.

He also won four medals at the FIBT World Championships with one gold (Four-man: 1977), two silvers (Two-man: 1978, Four-man: 1979), and one bronze (Four-man: 1978).

Nehmer grew up on Rügen, the son of a farmer. Prior to his role in bobsleigh, Nehmer competed in athletics as a javelin thrower, with a personal best of 81.5 m. After retiring from javelin competition at the age of 30, he was recruited into bobsleigh by coach Horst Hörnlein at the relatively advanced age of 32, although Nehmer initially believed that taking up a new sport at that age would not be worthwhile. At the time of his first Olympic success in 1976, he had only been bobsledding for three years.

Retiring from bobsleigh in the early 1980s, Nehmer worked for the Volksmarine, rising to the rank of Commander (Fregattenkapitän in (in German)), before being forced out following German reunification in late 1990.

After that, Nehmer worked as a bobsleigh coach: he coached the United States between 1991 and 1993, taking them to the 1992 Winter Olympics and leading them to their first bobsleigh medal at the FIBT World Championships for 24 years in 1993 and an overall Bobsleigh World Cup title for Brian Shimer's crew. He then served as Italian national coach from 1993 to 2000, before being appointed as assistant coach to his former brakeman Raimund Bethge as part of the German national team, helping Christoph Langen and André Lange to their Olympic victories. He retired from coaching after the 2006 Winter Olympics in Turin, returning to farm on Rügen.

In July 2016, he was inducted into Germany's Sports Hall of Fame.
