= FIBT World Championships 1978 =

Winter sport competition

1978 World Championships
- Location: Lake Placid, New York

The FIBT World Championships 1978 took place in Lake Placid, New York, United States for the fifth time, hosting the event previously in 1949, 1961, 1969, and 1973.

== Two man bobsleigh ==
Pos	Team	Time
Gold	Switzerland (Erich Schärer, Josef Benz)	
Silver	East Germany (Meinhard Nehmer, Raimund Bethge)	
Bronze	West Germany (Jakob Resch, Walter Barfuss)	

== Four man bobsleigh ==
Pos	Team	Time
Gold	East Germany (Horst Schönau, Horst Bernhard, Harald Seifert, Bogdan Musioł)	
Silver	Switzerland (Erich Schärer, Ulrich Bächli, Rudolf Marti, Josef Benz)	
Bronze	East Germany (Meinhard Nehmer, Bernhard Germeshausen, Hans-Jürgen Gerhardt, Raimund Bethge)	

== Medal table ==
Rank	Nation	Gold	Silver	Bronze	Total
1	East Germany (GDR)	1	1	1	3
2	Switzerland (SUI)	1	1	0	2
3	West Germany (FRG)	0	0	1	1
Totals (3 entries)		2	2	2	6
