= Hans-Jürgen Gerhardt =

East German bobsledder (born 1954)

Medal record

Men's bobsleigh

Representing East Germany

Olympic Games
Gold medal – first place	1980 Lake Placid	Four-man
Silver medal – second place	1980 Lake Placid	Two-man

World Championships
Gold medal – first place	1977 St. Moritz	Four-man
Gold medal – first place	1981 Cortina d'Ampezzo	Two-man
Gold medal – first place	1981 Cortina d'Ampezzo	Four-man
Silver medal – second place	1979 Königssee	Four-man
Bronze medal – third place	1978 Lake Placid	Four-man

Hans-Jürgen Gerhardt (born 5 September 1954 in Altenburg, Thuringia) is an East German bobsledder who competed in the late 1970s and early 1980s. At the 1980 Winter Olympics in Lake Placid, he won two medals with a gold medal in the four-man and a silver medal in the two-man events.

Gerhardt also won five medals at the FIBT World Championships with three golds (Two-man: 1981, Four-man: 1977, 1981), one silver (Four-man: 1979), and one bronze (Four-man: 1978).

Gerhardt later married Olympic figure skater Kerstin Stolfig.
