= Antonio Brancaccio (bobsledder) =

Italian bobsledder (born 1940)

Medal record

Bobsleigh

World Championships
Silver medal – second place	1971 Cervinia	Four-man

Antonio Brancaccio (born 22 August 1940) is an Italian bobsledder, who competed in the early 1970s. He won a silver medal in the four-man event at the 1971 FIBT World Championships in Cervinia.
