= Karl Lustenberger =

Swiss Nordic combined skier

Karl Lustenberger (born 10 October 1952) was a Swiss Nordic combined skier who competed in the late 1970s and early 1980s. He finished sixth in the Nordic combined event at the 1980 Winter Olympics in Lake Placid, New York.

Lustenberger also won the Nordic combined event at the 1979 Holmenkollen ski festival.
