= Mt. Van Hoevenberg Olympic Bobsled Run =

- U.S. National Register of Historic Places
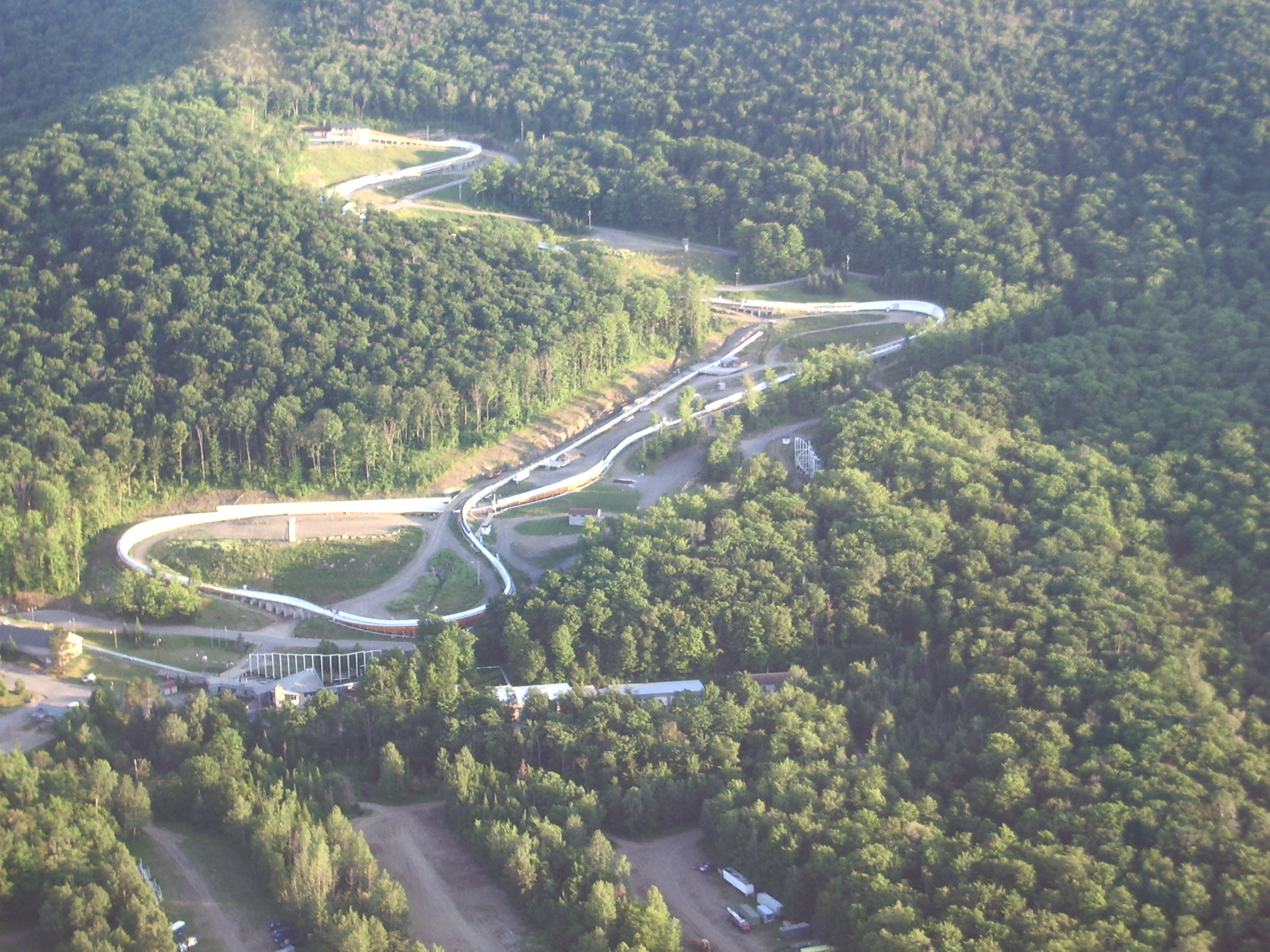
- 2005 aerial view of the current bobsleigh, luge, and skeleton track

- Location within New York Location within the United States
- Location: 220 Bob Sled Run, vicinity of Lake Placid, New York
- Coordinates: 44.217°N 73.925°W
- Area: 23 acres (9.3 ha)
- NRHP reference No.: 10000008
- Added to NRHP: February 4, 2010

The Mt. Van Hoevenberg Olympic Bobsled Run is a venue for bobsleigh, luge and skeleton on Mount Van Hoevenberg, located at the Lake Placid Olympic Sports Complex in Lake Placid, New York, United States. This venue was used for the 1932 and 1980 Winter Olympics and for the only winter Goodwill Games in 2000. The track hosted both the first FIBT World Championships and FIL World Luge Championships held outside of Europe, doing so in 1949 and 1983. The third and most recent version of the track was completed in 2000. In 2010 the bobsled track was listed on the National Register of Historic Places.

== History ==
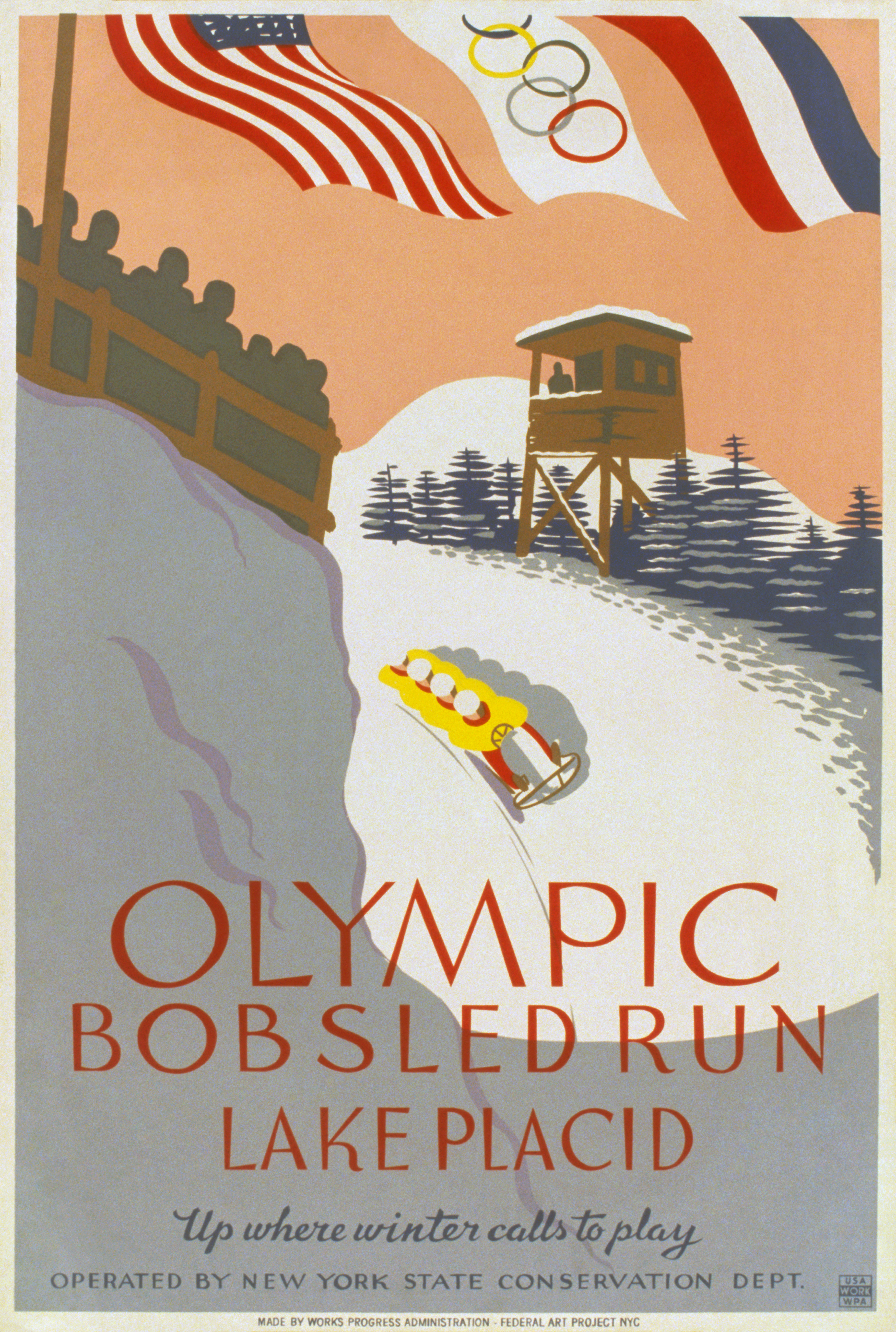
Works Progress Administration poster from the late 1930s to advertise public access to the bobsled run from the 1932 Winter Olympics in Lake Placid, New York

The bobsled track was built in 1930. The following year, Popular Science reported that it was "... called the only scientifically constructed bobsled run in America and the only one of its kind in the world." According to the National Park Service:

Carved out of wilderness and surrounded by forested land on all sides, the one and one-half mile long Olympic Bobsled Run was constructed in 1930 and built specifically for the 1932 Winter Olympic Games. The course was designed by Stanislaus Sentzytsky, a renowned German course designer, who designed a course that was radically different from its European counterparts. The Lake Placid course was longer, steeper, and featured a more pronounced drop in curves than European runs, which allowed for steadier driving and faster speeds than those obtained on prior bobsled events. After the American team won two gold medals and one silver in 1932, bobsledding, previously unknown in America, captivated the country’s interest, and U.S. teams dominated the sport until 1956. Although portions of the course have been retired, parts of the original Olympic Bobsled Run continue to be used for training and recreation.

As Mt. Van Hoevenberg Olympic Bobsled Run, the structure was listed on the U.S. National Register of Historic Places on February 4, 2010. The listing was announced as the featured listing in the National Park Service's weekly list of February 19, 2010.

Prior to the 1932 Winter Olympics, bobsleigh racing took place at the steep hill where the Intervales ski jump would eventually be located. The attendees were delighted by the speeds of the bobsleds though several teams crashed during the run, sending two members of one team to the hospital as a result. The Intervales track only lasted one season (1929–30). Led by Henry Homburger, the first track was surveyed and constructed during 1929-30 at Mount Van Hoevenberg, located in the Whiteface Mountain area though it was in spite of protests of using state-owned lands for construction of the facility for environmental reasons. After construction took place during August–December 1930, the track opened for use on Christmas Day 1930. This track was 2.366 kilometers (1.47 miles) in length with 26 curves with a vertical drop of 228 m (748 ft), and an average grade of 9.6%.

After 1932, the upper 0.829 km (0.515 mi) and ten curves of the track were eliminated, shortening the track's length to 1.537 km (0.955 mi) with 16 curves and an average grade of 9.3%. In 1949, the track became the first venue outside of Europe to host the FIBT World Championships though it would start with tragic results when Belgian Max Houben was killed during a practice run off of "Shady" curve prior to the event; the Belgian team withdrew as a result.

Another twelve years passed before the track hosted another world championship following safety improvements to the track. By this time, track officials had established a relationship with the International Bobsleigh and Tobogganing Federation (FIBT). Sergio Zardini's fatal crash at the "Zig-Zag curves" on 22 February 1966 led to further safety improvements.

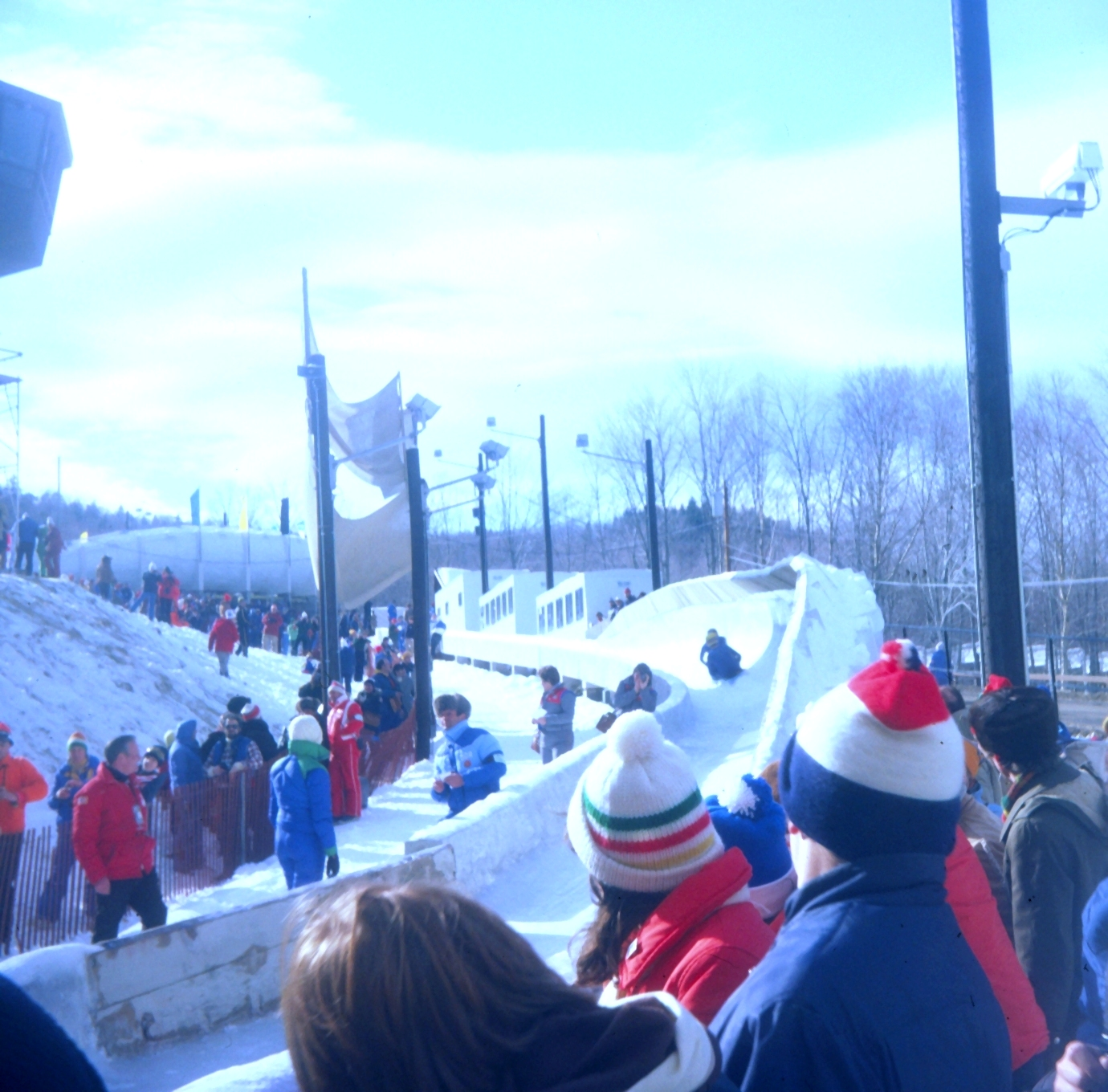
Bobsled run during the 1980 Winter Olympics

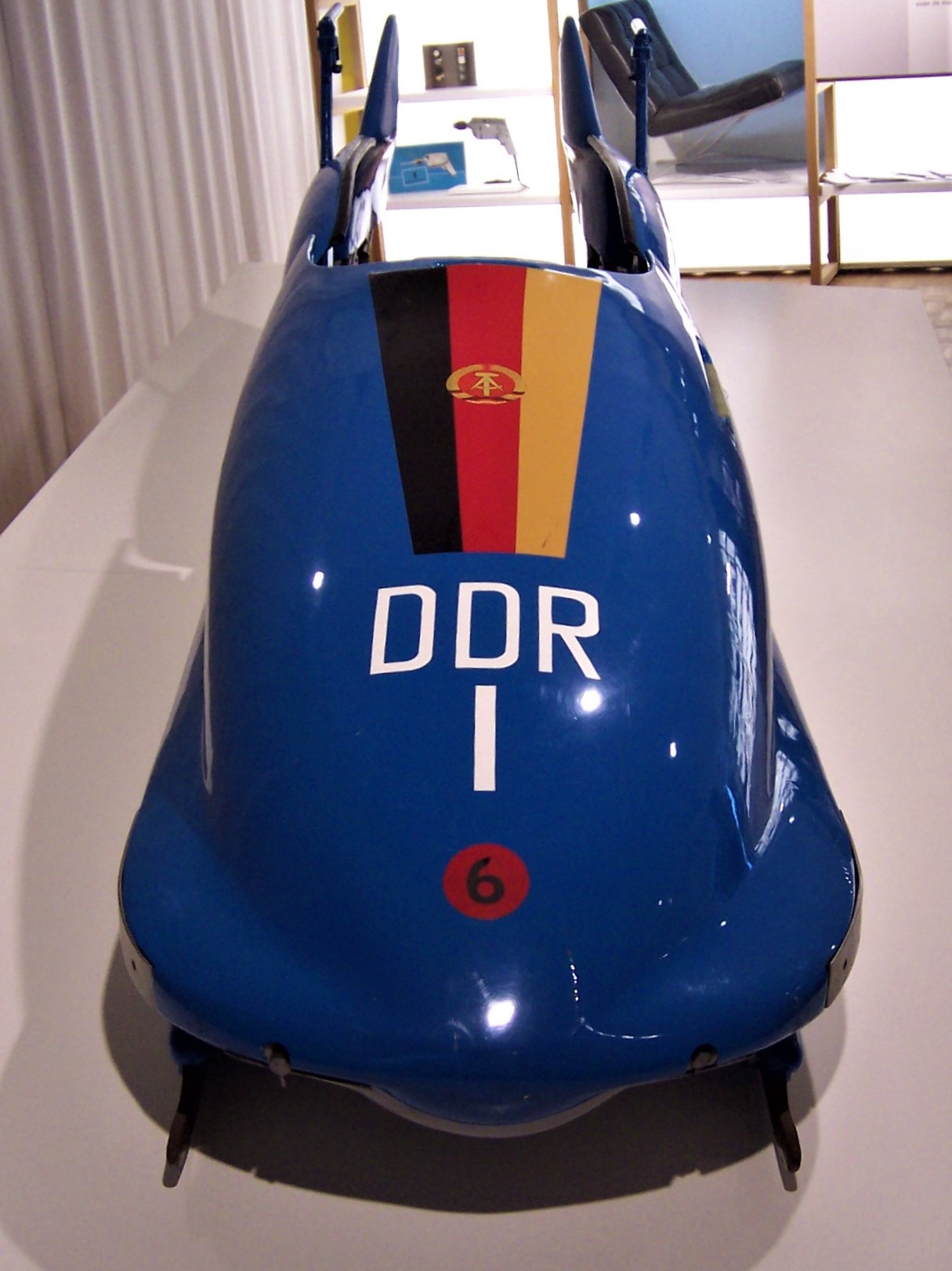
East German bobsleigh which won Olympic gold in 1980

Following the world bobsleigh championships of 1969, 1973, and 1978, many race officials of those championships served on the organizing committee for the bobsleigh part of the 1980 Winter Olympics. In 1978 actual construction took place during September 1978-February 1979 with the creation of a reinforced concrete, artificially refrigerated bobsleigh track. The bobsleigh track was approved for competition in December 1979. In fall 1977, a separate luge track for the 1980 Games, the first one in the United States, was constructed with completion in time for the test competition in February 1979. During preparations for the 1980 Games, a combined two-man bobsleigh and luge track was considered but abandoned due to high cost, and the track was redesigned with permission from the International Luge Federation (FIL). Following the 1980 games, both tracks hosted their respective world championships in 1983. The 1932 track continued to be used strictly for passenger riding after the new combined track was sanctioned.

Skeleton racing debuted during the 1990s with the bobsleigh part of the track hosting the world championships in 1997. By the late 1990s, parts of both tracks were demolished to make way for a new track, completed in January 2000, that was constructed for the 2000 Winter Goodwill Games. The track has been part of the Lake Placid Olympic Sports Complex since the end of the 1980 Winter Olympics as part of the Olympic Regional Development Authority (ORDA).

Since 2006, it has hosted the Chevy Geoff Bodine Bobsled Challenge, an annual event which has NASCAR drivers take a run down the track to benefit the Bo-Dyn Bobsled Project (co-created by the former NASCAR driver and 1986 Daytona 500 winner), which has been utilized by the United States team since the 1994 Winter Olympics. In 2009, the competition included both NASCAR and the National Hot Rod Association (NHRA) and was won by Jeg Coughlin Jr. (NHRA). The 2010 event took place January 8–10 with Melanie Troxel of the NHRA becoming the first woman to compete in the event.

In 2009, the track became the first to host bobsleigh, luge, and skeleton world championships in the same year in a non-Winter Olympic year (the Utah Olympic Park Track in Park City, Utah was the first to do so during the 2002 Winter Olympics.)

In December 2024, it was reported that the track had been designated as a backup venue for the 2026 Winter Olympics in Milan and Cortina d'Ampezzo if the restoration of the Eugenio Monti Olympic Track is unable to be completed in time.

== Current track statistics ==
Physical statistics
Sport	Length	Turns	Grade
Bobsleigh and men's singles luge	1.455 km (0.904 mi)	20	9.8%
Skeleton	-	19	9.8%
Luge - women's singles and men's doubles	1.130 km (0.702 mi)	17	-

- The vertical drop is 420 ft (128 m); its base area is approximately 2,200 feet (670 m) above sea level.

The track names were given by John Morgan during Speed Channel's World Cup bobsleigh coverage on 30 December 2006. Turn one is not listed. Even though luge - men's singles has their starthouse to the right of bobsleigh and skeleton start, the men's singles start in the same location as the bobsleigh and skeleton.

Current track turns
Turn	Name	Reason named
2; 3	Cliffside	Named in honor of the original Cliffside curve because the track was located alongside a cliff.
4	Whiteface	After Whiteface Mountain in the Adirondack Mountains of New York. Luge - women's singles, men's doubles, and mixed team relay join the track at this curve.
5; 6; 7; 8; 9	Devil's Highway	Curves (5 through 7), followed by two short, successive curves (8, 9).
10	Shady II	Named in honor of the Shady corner on the 1932 track. This curve was named because it was in the shadows even when the rest of the track was shining.
11; 12; 13	Labyrinth	Three quick curves in succession.
14	Benham's bend.	After Stanley Benham (1913–70), who won the gold medal in the four-man event at the 1949 FIBT World Championships in Lake Placid.
15; 16	Chicane	Two small rolling "curves" in long straightaway before 17. An athlete on the proper line will appear to travel in a straight line between the exit of 14 and entrance of 17 as they travel through the chicane.
17; 18; 19	The Heart	Shaped like symbolic symbol of a heart.
20	Finish	The end of the track before the finish line.

Track records
Sport	Record	Nation - athlete(s)	Date	Time (seconds)
Bobsleigh two-woman	Start	Canada - Kaillie Humphries & Shelley-Ann Brown	December 15, 2007	5.54
Bobsleigh two-woman	Track	Germany - Sandra Kiriasis & Romy Logsch	December 15, 2007	56.94
Luge - men's singles	Start	David Möller - Germany	February 7, 2009	1.712
Luge - men's singles	Track	Tucker West - United States	December 5, 2014	51.002
Luge - women's singles	Start	Tatjana Hüfner - Germany	February 6, 2009	6.350
Luge - women's singles	Track	Summer Britcher - United States	March 18, 2017	43.878
Luge - men's doubles	Start	Germany - Tobias Wendl & Tobias Arlt	February 6, 2009	6.219
Luge - men's doubles	Track	Italy - Gerhard Plankensteiner & Oswald Haselrieder	February 6, 2009	43.641
Skeleton - men's	Track	Matthew Antoine - United States	March 4, 2011	53.68
Skeleton - women's	Track	Marion Trott - Germany	February 26, 2009	56.23

== Previous tracks ==
The only curves mentioned in the 1932 Winter Olympics official report of the 26 total are shown below:

1932 track curves
Turn	Name	Reason named
4	Eyrle	-
10	Whiteface	After Whiteface Mountain of the Adirondack Mountains of New York.
14	Cliffside	Because the track was located alongside a cliff.
19	Shady Corner	The corner was in the shadows even when the rest of the track was shining.
23; 24; 25	Zig-Zag	Labyrinth curve (three quick curves in succession) in the shape of an S.

The bobsleigh track used for the 1980 Winter Olympics consisted of 16 curves that was 1.557 km (0.967 mi) long with a vertical drop of 148 m (486 ft), a maximum grade of 14.0%, and an average grade of 9.5%.

The luge track used for the 1980 Winter Olympics had two different settings to the different start houses used during the competition. For the men's singles event, the track consisted of 14 curves that was 1.014 km (0.630 mi) long with a vertical drop of 95.55 m (313.5 ft), a maximum gradient of 30% and an average grade of 9.35%. In the women's singles and men's doubles event, the track consisted of 11 curves that was 0.749 km (0.465 mi) long with a vertical drop of 59 m (194 ft), a maximum grade of 30%, and an average grade of 9.35%.

== Championships hosted ==
- Winter Olympics: 1932, 1980
- FIBT World Championships: 1949, 1961, 1969, 1973, 1978, 1983, 1997 (men's skeleton), 2003 (Men's bobsleigh), 2009, 2012, 2025
- FIL World Luge Championships: 1983, 2009

== In popular culture ==
The Mt. Van Hoevenberg Olympic Bobsled Run appeared in a 1966 television advertisement for Buick's 1966 Skylark automobile. The commercial featured shots of the vehicle driving down portions of the bobsled run.
