= Michael Pugh =

British bobsledder

Personal information
- Nationality: British
- Born: 20 July 1953 (age 71); Trowbridge, England

Sport
- Sport: Bobsleigh

Michael Pugh (born 20 July 1953) is a British bobsledder. He competed at the 1980 Winter Olympics and the 1984 Winter Olympics.
