= Heinz Busche =

German bobsledder

Medal record

Men's Bobsleigh

Representing West Germany

World Championships
Gold medal – first place	1979 Königssee	Four-man

Heinz Busche (born 6 September 1951) is a West German bobsledder who competed in the late 1970s. He won the gold medal in the four-man event at the 1979 FIBT World Championships in Königssee.

At the 1980 Winter Olympics in Lake Placid, Busche finished seventh in the four-man event and eighth in the two-man event.
