= Roland Burn =

Swiss biathlete (born 1950)

Personal information
- Nationality: Swiss
- Born: 14 January 1950 (age 75)

Sport
- Sport: Biathlon

Roland Burn (born 14 January 1950) is a Swiss biathlete. He competed in the 20 km individual event at the 1980 Winter Olympics.
