= Herbert Berg (bobsleigh) =

West German bobsledder

Medal record

Representing West Germany

World Championships
Bronze medal – third place	1977 St. Moritz	Four-man

Herbert Berg is a bobsledder who competed for West Germany in the late 1970s. He won a bronze medal in the four-man event at the 1977 FIBT World Championships in St. Moritz.
