= Raimund Bethge =

German bobsledder (born 1947)

Personal information
- Born: 7 July 1947 (age 79) Schwedt, Brandenburg, East Germany

Sport
- Sport: Bobsleigh; Hurdling
Medal record
Representing East Germany
Bobsleigh
World Championships
Gold medal – first place	1977 St. Moritz	Four-man
Silver medal – second place	1978 Lake Placid	Two-man
Bronze medal – third place	1978 Lake Placid	Four-man
European Championships
Silver medal – second place	1978 Igls	Four-man

Raimund Bethge (born 7 July 1947) is an East German bobsledder who competed in the late 1970s. He took up the sport in 1975. He won a complete set of medals at the FIBT World Championships with a gold in four-man (1977), a silver in two-man (1978, and a bronze in four-man (1978). He also took a silver in the European Championships in 1978 in the four-man event. Bethge also competed at the 1976 Winter Olympics in Innsbruck, finishing fourth in the four-man event and seventh in the two-man event.

Prior to his role in bobsleigh, Bethge was national champion in the 110 metres hurdles in 1969, and finished fifth in the event at the 1969 European Championships in Athletics in Athens. He also won East German national titles in the 110 metres hurdles and the indoor 55 metres hurdles in 1969 and as part of a successful 4 × 100 metres relay team in 1970.

Bethge was forced to retire from bobsleigh in 1979 following a bus accident. That same year he took up coaching, initially as an assistant club coach at the Oberhof track. He became a trainer for the bobsleigh federation in East Germany, then for unified Germany after East and West Germany reunified in 1990. One of the athletes he trained was Wolfgang Hoppe, who would later become a coach for the German team. Another would be Christoph Langen, another successful bobsledder who was appointed as coach of the German team in 2010.

Bethge was named trainer of the year in Germany in 2006 by the German Olympic Sports Confederation as a result of his successes that included 80 men's bobsleigh medals overall (Winter Olympics, World championship, and European championship), 11 women's bobsleigh medals overall, and 11 skeleton medals overall. He donated the €10,000 prize money to the German Bobsleigh, Luge, and Skeleton Federation to fund youth development. He was able to attend the 2006 Winter Olympics in Turin despite breaking both of his legs after being hit by an Australian bobsled during a practice run at Cesana Pariol on 30 November 2005. Bethge was planning to avoid travelling to the 2010 Winter Olympics in Vancouver due to health problems arising from these injuries, but after the whole German team appealed to him to reconsider by wearing "Raimund for Whistler" t-shirts at a World Cup race in St. Moritz he agreed to attend the Games. He retired from coaching in August 2010.

Bethge is the half-brother of the sports shooter Bernhard Hochwald and Katja Klepp is his sister-in-law.
