= Horst Schönau =

East German bobsledder

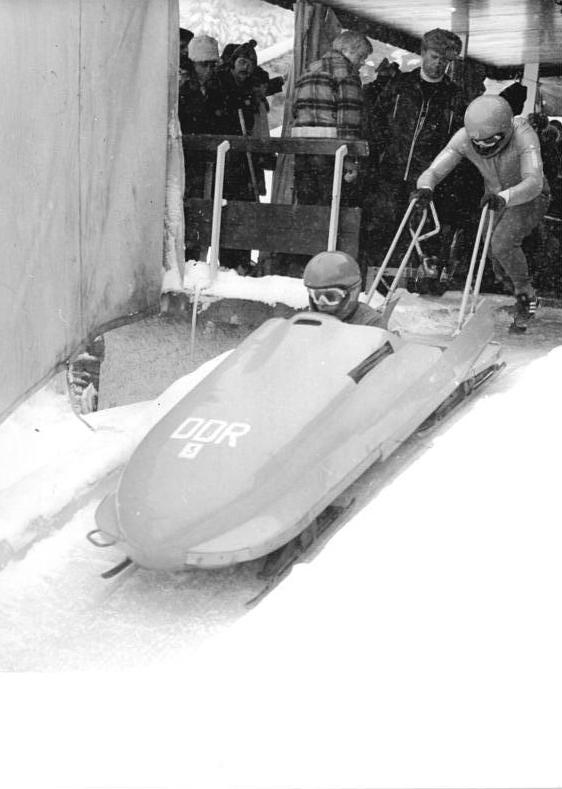
- Schönau (seated in sled) in 1979.
Medal record
Men's bobsleigh
Representing East Germany
Olympic Games
Bronze medal – third place	1980 Lake Placid	Four-man
World Championships
Gold medal – first place	1978 Lake Placid	Four-man
Silver medal – second place	1981 Cortina d'Ampezzo	Two-man
Bronze medal – third place	1982 St. Moritz	Two-man

Horst Schönau (born 2 April 1949 in Waltershausen, Thuringia) is an East German bobsledder who competed in the late 1970s and early 1980s. He won a bronze medal in the four-man event at the 1980 Winter Olympics in Lake Placid.

Schönau also won a complete set of medals at the FIBT World Championships with a gold (Four-man: 1978), a silver (Two-man: 1981), and a bronze (Two-man: 1982).

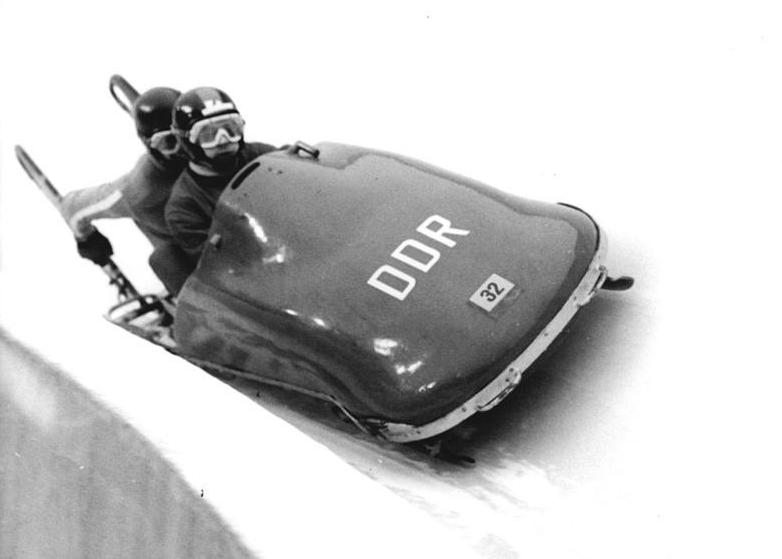
Horst Schönau (pilot) and Harald Seifert in 1977.
