= Cornelia Thomas =

Swiss cross-country skier

Personal information
- Nationality: Switzerland
- Born: 28 June 1960 (age 66)

Sport
- Sport: Skiing

World Cup career
- Seasons: 1 – (1982)
- Indiv. starts: 3
- Indiv. podiums: 0
- Team starts: 0
- Overall titles: 0 – (24th in 1982)

Cornelia Thomas (born 28 June 1960) is a Swiss cross-country skier. She competed in two events at the 1980 Winter Olympics.

== Cross-country skiing results ==
All results are sourced from the International Ski Federation (FIS).

=== Olympic Games ===
Year	Age	5 km	10 km	4 × 5 km relay
1980	19	34	36	—

=== World Cup ===
==== Season standings ====
Season	Age	Overall
1982	21	24
