= Joey Kilburn =

Canadian bobsledder

Personal information
- Full name: Joseph William Kilburn
- Born: 27 April 1949 (age 76); Ottawa, Ontario, Canada

Sport
- Sport: Bobsleigh

Joseph William “Joey” Kilburn (born 27 April 1949) is a Canadian bobsledder. He competed at the 1976 Winter Olympics and the 1980 Winter Olympics.

== Career ==
Kilburn competed in two Olympic Bobsleigh Championships: Innsbruck 1976, and Lake Placid 1980, placing 23rd and 13th respectively. He competed in 1980 with Canadian teammate Robert Wilson.
