= Bernhard Germeshausen =

East German bobsledder (1951–2022)

Medal record

Men's bobsleigh

Representing East Germany

Olympic Games
| Gold medal – first place | 1976 Innsbruck | Two-man |
| Gold medal – first place | 1976 Innsbruck | Four-man |
| Gold medal – first place | 1980 Lake Placid | Four-man |
| Silver medal – second place | 1980 Lake Placid | Two-man |

World Championships
| Gold medal – first place | 1977 St. Moritz | Four-man |
| Gold medal – first place | 1981 Cortina d'Ampezzo | Two-man |
| Gold medal – first place | 1981 Cortina d'Ampezzo | Four-man |
| Silver medal – second place | 1979 Königssee | Four-man |
| Bronze medal – third place | 1978 Lake Placid | Four-man |

Bernhard Germeshausen (21 August 1951 – 15 April 2022) was an East German bobsledder who competed from the mid-1970s to the early 1980s. Competing in two Winter Olympics, he won four medals with three golds (Two-man: 1976, Four-man: 1976, 1980) and one silver (Two-man: 1980).

He also won five medals at the FIBT World Championships with three golds (Two-man: 1981, Four-man: 1977, 1981), one silver (Four-man: 1979), and one bronze (Four-man: 1978).

Prior to his role in bobsleigh, Germeshausen competed in track and field athletics as a decathlete, winning the East German championship in 1974.

He later became a sports instructor.
