= Rudolf Marti =

Swiss bobsledder (born 1950)

Medal record

Bobsleigh

Olympic Games
Silver medal – second place	1976 Innsbruck	Four-man
Silver medal – second place	1980 Lake Placid	Four-man

World Championships
Silver medal – second place	1977 St. Moritz	Four-man
Silver medal – second place	1978 Lake Placid	Four-man

Rudolf Marti (born 7 April 1950) is a Swiss bobsleigher who competed from the mid-1970s to the early 1980s. Competing in two Winter Olympics, he won two silver medals in the four-man event (1976, and 1980).

Marti also won two silver medals in the four-man event at the FIBT World Championships, earning them in 1977 and 1978.
