= Erich Schärer =

Swiss bobsledder (born 1946)

Medal record

Men's Bobsleigh

Representing Switzerland

Olympic Games
| Gold medal – first place | 1980 Lake Placid | Two-man |
| Silver medal – second place | 1976 Innsbruck | Four-man |
| Silver medal – second place | 1980 Lake Placid | Four-man |
| Bronze medal – third place | 1976 Innsbruck | Two-man |

World Championships
| Gold medal – first place | 1971 Cervinia | Four-man |
| Gold medal – first place | 1973 Lake Placid | Four-man |
| Gold medal – first place | 1975 Cervinia | Four-man |
| Gold medal – first place | 1978 Lake Placid | Two-man |
| Gold medal – first place | 1979 Königssee | Two-man |
| Gold medal – first place | 1982 St. Moritz | Two-man |
| Gold medal – first place | 1986 Königssee | Four-man |
| Silver medal – second place | 1977 St. Moritz | Four-man |
| Silver medal – second place | 1978 Lake Placid | Four-man |
| Silver medal – second place | 1983 Lake Placid | Two-man |
| Bronze medal – third place | 1979 Königssee | Four-man |
| Bronze medal – third place | 1981 Cortina d'Ampezzo | Two-man |
| Bronze medal – third place | 1981 Cortina d'Ampezzo | Four-man |
| Bronze medal – third place | 1982 St. Moritz | Four-man |

Erich Schärer (born 1 September 1946 in Zurich) is a Swiss bobsledder who competed from the early 1970s to the mid-1980s. Competing in two Winter Olympics, he won four medals with one gold (Two-man: 1980), two silvers (Four-man: 1976, 1980), and one bronze (Two-man: 1976).

Schärer also won fourteen medals at the FIBT World Championships with seven golds (Two-man: 1978, 1979, 1982; Four-man: 1971, 1973, 1975, 1986), three silvers (Two-man: 1983, Four-man: 1977, 1978), and four bronzes (Two-man: 1981, Four-man: 1979, 1981, 1982). The first two titles he won as pusher in the team of driver René Stadler before a became a driver himself.
