= Ulrich Bächli =

Swiss bobsledder (born 1950)

Personal information
- Born: 5 January 1950 (age 76) Zürich, Switzerland
Medal record
Bobsleigh
Representing Switzerland
Olympic Games
Silver medal – second place	1976 Innsbruck	Four-man
Silver medal – second place	1980 Lake Placid	Four-man
World Championships
Silver medal – second place	1977 St. Moritz	Four-man
Silver medal – second place	1978 Lake Placid	Four-man
Silver medal – second place	1982 St. Moritz	Two-man
Bronze medal – third place	1979 Königssee	Four-man

Ulrich "Ueli" Bächli (born 5 January 1950 in Zürich) is a Swiss bobsledder who competed from the mid-1970s to the early 1980s. Competing in two Winter Olympics, he won two silver medals in the four-man event (1976, 1980).

Bächli also won four medals at the FIBT World Championships with three silvers (Two-man: 1982; Four-man: 1977, 1978) and one bronze (Four-man: 1979).
