= Joseph Benz =

Swiss bobsledder (1944–2021)

Personal information
- Born: 20 May 1944 Zurich, Switzerland
- Died: 5 February 2021 (aged 76) Zurich, Switzerland
Medal record
Men's Bobsleigh
Representing Switzerland
Olympic Games
| Gold medal – first place | 1980 Lake Placid | Two-man |
| Silver medal – second place | 1976 Innsbruck | Four-man |
| Silver medal – second place | 1980 Lake Placid | Four-man |
| Bronze medal – third place | 1976 Innsbruck | Two-man |
World Championships
| Gold medal – first place | 1975 Cervinia | Four-man |
| Gold medal – first place | 1978 Lake Placid | Two-man |
| Gold medal – first place | 1979 Königssee | Two-man |
| Silver medal – second place | 1977 St. Moritz | Four-man |
| Silver medal – second place | 1978 Lake Placid | Four-man |
| Bronze medal – third place | 1979 Königssee | Four-man |
| Bronze medal – third place | 1981 Cortina d'Ampezzo | Two-man |
| Bronze medal – third place | 1981 Cortina d'Ampezzo | Four-man |

Joseph "Josef" or "Sepp" Benz (20 May 1944 – 5 February 2021) was a Swiss bobsledder who competed from the mid-1970s to the early 1980s. Competing in two Winter Olympics, he won four medals with one gold (Two-man: 1980), two silvers (Four-man: 1976, 1980), and one bronze (Two-man: 1976).

== Career ==
Benz, who was born in Zurich, won eight medals at the FIBT World Championships with three golds (Two-man: 1978, 1979; Four-man: 1981), two silvers (Four-man: 1977, 1978), and three bronzes (Two-man: 1981, Four-man: 1979, 1981).

In 2008, he was named chairman of the Sport Commission for artificial track luge for the International Luge Federation (FIL). Benz also was a postal clerk in his native Switzerland. He served as chairman of the FIL Youth Commission before serving as chairman of the Sport Commission from 2008 to 2014. During his tenure in Artificial track, Benz created the team relay event that was first held at the 2008 world championships and became an event at the 2014 Winter Olympics.

== Death ==
Benz died from COVID-19 on 5 February 2021, at age 76, during the COVID-19 pandemic in Switzerland.
