= Bobsleigh at the 1984 Winter Olympics – Four-man =

Four-man at the XIV Olympic Winter Games
- Bobsleigh
- Venue: Sarajevo Olympic Bobsleigh and Luge Track
- Dates: February 17 — 18, 1984
- Competitors: 96 from 15 nations
- Winning time: 3:20.22

Medalists
1st place, gold medalist(s)		East Germany; Wolfgang Hoppe, Roland Wetzig, Dietmar Schauerhammer, Andreas Kirchner
2nd place, silver medalist(s)		East Germany; Bernhard Lehmann, Bogdan Musioł, Ingo Voge, Eberhard Weise
3rd place, bronze medalist(s)		Switzerland; Silvio Giobellina, Heinz Stettler, Urs Salzmann, Rico Freiermuth

The Men's four-man bobsleigh competition at the 1984 Winter Olympics in Sarajevo, Yugoslavia was held on 17 and 18 February, at the Sarajevo Olympic Bobsleigh and Luge Track on the mountain of Trebević. This was one of two bobsleigh events at these games.

The gold-winning pairing of Wolfgang Hoppe and Dietmar Schauerhammer from the two-man event, won their second golds as part of the four-man team. With every run, the best 3 runs were always the order of medallists.

== Results ==
All 24 teams entered for the event completed all four runs

Rank	Country	Athletes	Run 1	Run 2	Run 3	Run 4	Total
Gold medal	East Germany (GDR-1)	Wolfgang Hoppe; Roland Wetzig; Dietmar Schauerhammer; Andreas Kirchner	49.65	50.18	50.18	50.21	3:20.22
Silver medal	East Germany (GDR-2)	Bernhard Lehmann; Bogdan Musioł; Ingo Voge; Eberhard Weise	49.69	50.33	50.32	50.44	3:20.78
Bronze medal	Switzerland (SUI-1)	Silvio Giobellina; Heinz Stettler; Urs Salzmann; Rico Freiermuth	49.92	50.48	50.49	50.50	3:21.39
4	Switzerland (SUI-2)	Ekkehard Fasser; Hans Märchy; Kurt Poletti; Rolf Strittmatter	50.46	50.60	50.81	51.03	3:22.90
5	United States (USA-1)	Jeff Jost; Joe Briski; Tom Barnes; Hal Hoye	50.83	50.97	50.89	50.64	3:23.33
6	Soviet Union (URS-1)	Jānis Ķipurs; Māris Poikāns; Ivars Bērzups; Aivars Šnepsts	50.19	50.96	51.19	51.17	3:23.51
7	Romania	Dorin Degan; Cornel Popescu; Gheorghe Lixandru; Costel Petrariu	50.58	50.88	51.06	51.24	3:23.76
8	Italy (ITA-2)	Guerrino Ghedina; Stefano Ticci; Paolo Scaramuzza; Andrea Meneghin	50.66	50.93	51.00	51.18	3:23.77
9	West Germany (FRG-1)	Klaus Kopp; Gerhard Oechsle; Günter Neuburger; Hans-Joachim Schumacher	50.71	51.09	51.01	51.34	3:24.15
10	Austria (AUT-1)	Walter Delle Karth; Günter Krispel; Ferdinand Grössing; Hans Lindner	50.60	51.14	51.19	51.28	3:24.21
11	Austria (AUT-2)	Peter Kienast; Franz Siegl; Gerhard Redl; Christian Mark	50.83	51.27	51.29	51.24	3:24.63
12	Soviet Union (URS-2)	Zintis Ekmanis; Jānis Skrastiņš; Rihards Kotāns; Vladimir Aleksandrov	51.08	51.36	51.28	51.48	3:25.20
13	France	Gérard Christaud-Pipola; Philippe Aurox; Philippe Stott; Patrick Lachaud	50.77	51.51	51.50	51.48	3:25.26
14	West Germany (FRG-2)	Anton Fischer; Franz Nießner; Hans Metzler; Uwe Eisenreich	51.08	51.39	51.48	51.36	3:25.31
15	Great Britain (GBR-2)	Gomer Lloyd; Howard Smith; Gus McKenzie; Peter Brugnani	51.15	51.11	51.44	51.64	3:25.34
16	United States (USA-2)	Brent Rushlaw; Ed Card; James Tyler; Frank Hansen	51.04	51.35	51.58	51.53	3:25.50
17	Italy (ITA-1)	Alex Wolf; Georg Beikircher; Pasquale Gesuito; Umberto Prato	51.12	51.19	51.57	51.63	3:25.51
18	Canada	Alan MacLachlan; Clarke Flynn; Robert Wilson; David Leuty	51.48	51.66	51.55	51.78	3:26.47
19	Yugoslavia (YUG-1)	Zdravko Stojnić; Mario Franjić; Siniša Tubić; Nikola Korica	51.32	51.90	51.65	51.61	3:26.48
20	Great Britain (GBR-1)	Mike Pugh; Tony Wallington; Corrie Brown; Mark Tout	51.52	51.84	51.68	51.89	3:26.93
21	Sweden	Carl-Erik Eriksson; Tommy Johansson; Ulf Åkerblom; Nils Stefansson	51.57	51.82	51.94	51.74	3:27.07
22	Chinese Taipei	Wu Dien-cheng; Sun Kuang-ming; Wu Chung-chou; Chen Chin-san	51.45	52.15	52.03	51.95	3:27.58
23	Yugoslavia (YUG-2)	Nenad Prodanović; Ognjen Sokolović; Zoran Sokolović; Borislav Vujadinović	51.62	51.96	52.35	52.38	3:28.31
24	Japan	Hiroshi Okachi; Yuji Yaku; Yuji Funayama; Satoshi Sugawara	51.97	52.01	52.40	52.37	3:28.75
