= West Germany at the 1984 Winter Olympics =

- Flag of Germany
- IOC code: FRG
- NOC: National Olympic Committee for Germany

in Sarajevo, Yugoslavia 7 February 1984 – 19 February 1984
- Competitors: 84 (69 men, 15 women) in 10 sports
- Flag bearer: Monika Pflug (speed skating)
- Medals Ranked 8th: Gold 2 Silver 1 Bronze 1 Total 4

Winter Olympics appearances (overview)
- 1968; 1972; 1976; 1980; 1984; 1988

Other related appearances
- Germany (1928–1936, 1952, 1992–); United Team of Germany (1956–1964)

West Germany (Federal Republic of Germany) competed at the 1984 Winter Olympics in Sarajevo, Yugoslavia. The German Ice Skating Union president Wolf-Dieter Montag served as the head of mission for West Germany.

== Medalists ==
| Medal | Name | Sport | Event | Date |
|---|---|---|---|---|
| Gold | Peter Angerer | Biathlon | Individual | 11 February |
| Gold | Hans Stanggassinger; Franz Wembacher | Luge | Doubles | 15 February |
| Silver | Peter Angerer | Biathlon | Sprint | 14 February |
| Bronze | Ernst Reiter; Walter Pichler; Peter Angerer; Fritz Fischer | Biathlon | Relay | 17 February |

== Alpine skiing ==
Men

| Athlete | Event | Race 1 | | Race 2 | | Total | |
| Athlete | Event | Time | Rank | Time | Rank | Time | Rank |
|---|---|---|---|---|---|---|---|
| Peter Dürr | Downhill | | | | | DNF | – |
| Herbert Renoth | Downhill | | | | | 1:48.39 | 22 |
| Klaus Gattermann | Downhill | | | | | 1:47.12 | 12 |
| Sepp Wildgruber | Downhill | | | | | 1:46.53 | 7 |
| Egon Hirt | Giant Slalom | 1:22.45 | 14 | 1:21.66 | 11 | 2:44.11 | 13 |
| Egon Hirt | Slalom | DNF | – | – | – | DNF | – |
| Florian Beck | Slalom | 53.49 | 18 | DNF | – | DNF | – |

Women

| Athlete | Event | Race 1 | | Race 2 | | Total | |
| Athlete | Event | Time | Rank | Time | Rank | Time | Rank |
|---|---|---|---|---|---|---|---|
| Irene Epple | Downhill | | | | | 1:15.65 | 23 |
| Regine Mösenlechner | Downhill | | | | | 1:15.16 | 17 |
| Heidi Wiesler | Downhill | | | | | 1:14.98 | 14 |
| Marina Kiehl | Downhill | | | | | 1:14.30 | 6 |
| Michaela Gerg-Leitner | Giant Slalom | 1:12.18 | 32 | 1:14.10 | 24 | 2:26.58 | 24 |
| Irene Epple | Giant Slalom | 1:11.64 | 22 | 1:13.88 | 22 | 2:25.52 | 21 |
| Maria Epple | Giant Slalom | 1:10.40 | 10 | 1:13.25 | 14 | 2:23.65 | 13 |
| Marina Kiehl | Giant Slalom | 1:09.70 | 5 | 1:12.33 | 5 | 2:22.03 | 5 |
| Maria Epple | Slalom | 49.63 | 11 | 49.14 | 11 | 1:38.77 | 12 |

== Biathlon ==
Men

| Event | Athlete | Misses ^{1} | Time | Rank |
|---|---|---|---|---|
| 10 km Sprint | Walter Pichler | 1 | 32:30.2 | 16 |
| 10 km Sprint | Fritz Fischer | 2 | 32:04.7 | 8 |
| 10 km Sprint | Peter Angerer | 1 | 31:02.4 | 2nd place, silver medalist(s) |

| Event | Athlete | Time | Penalties | Adjusted time ^{2} | Rank |
|---|---|---|---|---|---|
| 20 km | Ernst Reiter | 1'15:37.4 | 5 | 1'20:37.4 | 22 |
| 20 km | Fritz Fischer | 1'11:49.7 | 4 | 1'15:49.7 | 7 |
| 20 km | Peter Angerer | 1'09:52.7 | 2 | 1'11:52.7 | 1st place, gold medalist(s) |

Men's 4 x 7.5 km relay

| Athletes | Race | | |
| Athletes | Misses ^{1} | Time | Rank |
|---|---|---|---|
| Ernst Reiter; Walter Pichler; Peter Angerer; Fritz Fischer | 1 | 1'39:05.1 | 3rd place, bronze medalist(s) |

^{1}A penalty loop of 150 metres had to be skied per missed target.
^{2}One minute added per missed target.

== Bobsleigh ==
| Sled | Athletes | Event | Run 1 | | Run 2 | | Run 3 | | Run 4 | | Total | |
| Sled | Athletes | Event | Time | Rank | Time | Rank | Time | Rank | Time | Rank | Time | Rank |
|---|---|---|---|---|---|---|---|---|---|---|---|---|
| FRG-1 | Anton Fischer; Hans Metzler | Two-man | 52.29 | 7 | 52.25 | 7 | 52.18 | 9 | 52.46 | 11 | 3:29.18 | 8 |
| FRG-2 | Andreas Weikenstorfer; Hans-Jürgen Hartmann | Two-man | 52.31 | 8 | 53.05 | 15 | 52.60 | 15 | 52.45 | 10 | 3:30.41 | 11 |

| Sled | Athletes | Event | Run 1 | | Run 2 | | Run 3 | | Run 4 | | Total | |
| Sled | Athletes | Event | Time | Rank | Time | Rank | Time | Rank | Time | Rank | Time | Rank |
|---|---|---|---|---|---|---|---|---|---|---|---|---|
| FRG-1 | Klaus Kopp; Gerhard Oechsle; Günter Neuburger; Hans-Joachim Schumacher | Four-man | 50.71 | 9 | 51.09 | 9 | 51.01 | 7 | 51.34 | 11 | 3:24.15 | 9 |
| FRG-2 | Anton Fischer; Franz Nießner; Hans Metzler; Uwe Eisenreich | Four-man | 51.08 | 14 | 51.39 | 16 | 51.48 | 14 | 51.36 | 12 | 3:25.31 | 14 |

== Cross-country skiing ==
Men

| Event | Athlete | Race | |
| Event | Athlete | Time | Rank |
|---|---|---|---|
| 15 km | Jochen Behle | DNF | – |
| 15 km | Josef Schneider | 45:08.7 | 37 |
| 15 km | Franz Schöbel | 44:11.1 | 33 |
| 15 km | Stefan Dotzler | 44:02.6 | 30 |
| 30 km | Stefan Dotzler | 1'37:39.9 | 37 |
| 30 km | Peter Zipfel | 1'36:26.6 | 33 |
| 30 km | Jochen Behle | 1'32:58.7 | 15 |
| 50 km | Peter Zipfel | 2'30:57.7 | 38 |
| 50 km | Franz Schöbel | 2'30:30.2 | 37 |
| 50 km | Josef Schneider | 2'29:29.5 | 35 |

Men's 4 × 10 km relay

| Athletes | Race | |
| Athletes | Time | Rank |
|---|---|---|
| Jochen Behle; Stefan Dotzler; Franz Schöbel; Peter Zipfel | 1'59:30.2 | 6 |

Women

| Event | Athlete | Race | |
| Event | Athlete | Time | Rank |
|---|---|---|---|
| 10 km | Karin Jäger | 35:05.2 | 33 |
| 20 km | Karin Jäger | 1'06:20.2 | 19 |

== Figure skating ==
Men

| Athlete | CF | SP | FS | TFP | Rank |
|---|---|---|---|---|---|
| Heiko Fischer | 6 | 10 | 12 | 19.6 | 10 |
| Norbert Schramm | 9 | 7 | 8 | 16.2 | 9 |
| Rudi Cerne | 3 | 6 | 4 | 8.2 | 4 |

Women

| Athlete | CF | SP | FS | TFP | Rank |
|---|---|---|---|---|---|
| Claudia Leistner | 9 | 10 | 8 | 17.4 | 9 |
| Manuela Ruben | 6 | 11 | 7 | 15.0 | 7 |

Pairs

| Athletes | SP | FS | TFP | Rank |
|---|---|---|---|---|
| Claudia Massari; Leonardo Azzola | 11 | 13 | 18.5 | 13 |

Ice Dancing

| Athletes | CD | OD | FD | TFP | Rank |
|---|---|---|---|---|---|
| Petra Born; Rainer Schönborn | 9 | 9 | 9 | 18.0 | 9 |

== Ice hockey ==
=== Group A ===
Top two teams (shaded ones) advanced to the medal round.

| Team | Pld | W | L | T | GF | GA | Pts |
|---|---|---|---|---|---|---|---|
| Soviet Union | 5 | 5 | 0 | 0 | 42 | 5 | 10 |
| Sweden | 5 | 3 | 1 | 1 | 34 | 15 | 7 |
| West Germany | 5 | 3 | 1 | 1 | 27 | 17 | 7 |
| Poland | 5 | 1 | 4 | 0 | 16 | 37 | 2 |
| Italy | 5 | 1 | 4 | 0 | 15 | 31 | 2 |
| Yugoslavia | 5 | 1 | 4 | 0 | 8 | 37 | 2 |

- West Germany 8-1 Yugoslavia
- West Germany 8-5 Poland
- Sweden 1-1 West Germany
- USSR 6-1 West Germany
- West Germany 9-4 Italy

=== Game for 5th Place ===
| Team 1 | Score | Team 2 |
|---|---|---|
| West Germany | 7–4 | Finland |

=== Leading scorer ===
| Rk | Team | GP | G | A | Pts |
|---|---|---|---|---|---|
| 1st | Erich Kuhnhackl | 6 | 8 | 6 | 14 |

- Team roster

- Andreas Niederberger
- Bernd Englbrecht
- Dieter Hegen
- Erich Kühnhackl
- Ernst Höfner
- Franz Reindl
- Gerd Truntschka
- Harold Kreis
- Helmut Steiger
- Ignaz Berndaner
- Joachim Reil
- Karl Friesen
- Manfred Ahne
- Manfred Wolf
- Marcus Kuhl
- Michael Betz
- Peter Scharf
- Roy Roedger
- Udo Kiessling
- Uli Hiemer

- Head coach: Xaver Unsinn

== Luge ==
Men

| Athlete | Run 1 | | Run 2 | | Run 3 | | Run 4 | | Total | |
| Athlete | Time | Rank | Time | Rank | Time | Rank | Time | Rank | Time | Rank |
|---|---|---|---|---|---|---|---|---|---|---|
| Johannes Schettel | 47.318 | 16 | 47.071 | 15 | 46.947 | 13 | DSQ | – | DSQ | – |
| Thomas Rzeznizok | 46.704 | 11 | 46.970 | 12 | 47.154 | 16 | 46.539 | 12 | 3:07.367 | 12 |

(Men's) Doubles

| Athletes | Run 1 | | Run 2 | | Total | |
| Athletes | Time | Rank | Time | Rank | Time | Rank |
|---|---|---|---|---|---|---|
| Hans Stanggassinger; Franz Wembacher | 41.880 | 2 | 41.740 | 1 | 1:23.620 | 1st place, gold medalist(s) |
| Thomas Schwab; Wolfgang Staudinger | 42.267 | 8 | 42.367 | 9 | 1:24.634 | 8 |

Women

| Athlete | Run 1 | | Run 2 | | Run 3 | | Run 4 | | Total | |
| Athlete | Time | Rank | Time | Rank | Time | Rank | Time | Rank | Time | Rank |
|---|---|---|---|---|---|---|---|---|---|---|
| Andrea Hatle | 43.397 | 14 | 42.072 | 4 | 42.102 | 6 | 41.920 | 5 | 2:49.491 | 8 |
| Constanze Zeitz | 42.707 | 10 | 42.679 | 12 | 42.300 | 11 | 42.150 | 11 | 2:49.836 | 9 |

== Nordic combined ==
Events:

- normal hill ski jumping (Three jumps, best two counted and shown here.)
- 15 km cross-country skiing

| Athlete | Event | Ski Jumping | | | | Cross-country | | | Total | |
| Athlete | Event | Distance 1 | Distance 2 | Points | Rank | Time | Points | Rank | Points | Rank |
|---|---|---|---|---|---|---|---|---|---|---|
| Dirk Kramer | Individual | 78.5 | 79.5 | 189.0 | 19 | 49:43.7 | 191.245 | 13 | 380.245 | 18 |
| Thomas Müller | Individual | 85.0 | 87.0 | 209.1 | 3 | 49:32.7 | 192.895 | 12 | 401.995 | 5 |
| Hubert Schwarz | Individual | 72.5 | 88.0 | 181.6 | 23 | 51:42.0 | 173.500 | 26 | 355.100 | 24 |
| Hermann Weinbuch | Individual | 83.0 | 85.0 | 201.6 | 10 | 49:13.4 | 195.790 | 10 | 397.390 | 8 |

== Ski jumping ==
| Athlete | Event | Jump 1 | | Jump 2 | | Total | |
| Athlete | Event | Distance | Points | Distance | Points | Points | Rank |
|---|---|---|---|---|---|---|---|
| Thomas Klauser | Normal hill | 77.0 | 83.2 | 73.5 | 76.1 | 159.3 | 47 |
| Peter Rohwein | Normal hill | 83.0 | 94.3 | 69.0 | 66.9 | 161.2 | 44 |
| Georg Waldvogel | Normal hill | 83.0 | 96.8 | 80.0 | 91.0 | 187.8 | 22 |
| Andi Bauer | Normal hill | 87.0 | 104.7 | 83.0 | 97.3 | 202.0 | 11 |
| Peter Rohwein | Large hill | 92.5 | 77.7 | 95.0 | 80.7 | 158.4 | 35 |
| Georg Waldvogel | Large hill | 95.0 | 82.7 | 89.0 | 71.8 | 154.5 | 38 |
| Andi Bauer | Large hill | 105.0 | 102.2 | 100.5 | 92.4 | 194.6 | 7 |

== Speed skating ==
Men

| Event | Athlete | Race | |
| Event | Athlete | Time | Rank |
|---|---|---|---|
| 500 m | Uwe Streb | 39.78 | 26 |
| 500 m | Hans-Peter Oberhuber | 39.39 | 19 |
| 1000 m | Andreas Lemcke | 1:19.39 | 26 |
| 1000 m | Hans-Peter Oberhuber | 1:19.13 | 23 |
| 1000 m | Uwe Streb | 1:18.65 | 15 |
| 1500 m | Andreas Lemcke | 2:03.13 | 27 |
| 1500 m | Hansjörg Baltes | 2:02.68 | 26 |
| 1500 m | Wolfgang Scharf | 2:02.64 | 25 |
| 5000 m | Hansjörg Baltes | 7:50.33 | 37 |
| 5000 m | Andreas Lemcke | 7:41.69 | 29 |
| 5000 m | Wolfgang Scharf | 7:40.90 | 28 |
| 10,000 m | Wolfgang Scharf | 15:40.74 | 28 |

Women

| Event | Athlete | Race | |
| Event | Athlete | Time | Rank |
|---|---|---|---|
| 500 m | Sigrid Smuda | 43.74 | 20 |
| 500 m | Monika Pflug | 42.40 | 7 |
| 1000 m | Sigrid Smuda | 1:27.05 | 15 |
| 1000 m | Monika Pflug | 1:25.87 | 8 |
| 1500 m | Sigrid Smuda | 2:10.55 | 10 |
| 3000 m | Sigrid Smuda | 4:53.22 | 18 |
