= France at the 1984 Winter Olympics =

- IOC code: FRA
- NOC: French National Olympic and Sports Committee

in Sarajevo, Yugoslavia 8–19 February, 1984
- Competitors: 32 (22 men, 10 women) in 7 sports
- Flag bearer: Yvon Mougel (Biathlon)
- Medals Ranked 13th: Gold 0 Silver 1 Bronze 2 Total 3

Winter Olympics appearances (overview)
- 1924; 1928; 1932; 1936; 1948; 1952; 1956; 1960; 1964; 1968; 1972; 1976; 1980; 1984; 1988; 1992; 1994; 1998; 2002; 2006; 2010; 2014; 2018; 2022; 2026

France competed at the 1984 Winter Olympics in Sarajevo, Yugoslavia.

== Medalists ==
Medal	Name	Sport	Event	Date
Silver	Perrine Pelen	Alpine skiing	Women's slalom	17 February
Bronze	Perrine Pelen	Alpine skiing	Women's giant slalom	13 February
Bronze	Didier Bouvet	Alpine skiing	Men's slalom	19 February

== Alpine skiing ==
Men

Athlete	Event	Race 1		Race 2		Total	
Athlete	Event	Time	Rank	Time	Rank	Time	Rank
Philippe Verneret	Downhill					1:49.30	29
Michel Vion	Downhill					1:48.68	25
Franck Piccard	Downhill					1:48.06	20
Franck Piccard	Giant Slalom	DNF	–	–	–	DNF	–
Michel Vion	Giant Slalom	DNF	–	–	–	DNF	–
Yves Tavernier	Giant Slalom	1:23.32	17	1:22.05	14	2:45.37	16
Didier Bouvet	Giant Slalom	1:22.16	11	1:22.09	15	2:44.25	14
Michel Vion	Slalom	DSQ	–	–	–	DSQ	–
Michel Canac	Slalom	DNF	–	–	–	DNF	–
Yves Tavernier	Slalom	DNF	–	–	–	DNF	–
Didier Bouvet	Slalom	51.99	5	48.21	3	1:40.20	3rd place, bronze medalist(s)

Women

Athlete	Event	Race 1		Race 2		Total	
Athlete	Event	Time	Rank	Time	Rank	Time	Rank
Élisabeth Chaud	Downhill					DNF	–
Marie-Luce Waldmeier	Downhill					1:15.56	20
Caroline Attia	Downhill					1:15.04	15
Fabienne Serrat	Giant Slalom	1:11.52	21	DNF	–	DNF	–
Carole Merle	Giant Slalom	1:10.73	13	1:12.54	8	2:23.27	11
Anne-Flore Rey	Giant Slalom	1:10.09	7	1:12.86	13	2:22.95	10
Perrine Pelen	Giant Slalom	1:09.64	4	1:11.76	2	2:21.40	3rd place, bronze medalist(s)
Anne-Flore Rey	Slalom	DSQ	–	–	–	DSQ	–
Carole Merle	Slalom	51.68	20	52.62	16	1:44.30	16
Perrine Pelen	Slalom	48.85	4	48.53	4	1:37.38	2nd place, silver medalist(s)
Christelle Guignard	Slalom	48.71	1	DNF	–	DNF	–

== Biathlon ==
Men

Event	Athlete	Misses ^{1}	Time	Rank
10 km Sprint	Éric Claudon	2	34:05.1	28
10 km Sprint	Francis Mougel	4	33:50.4	27
10 km Sprint	Yvon Mougel	2	31:32.9	6

Event	Athlete	Time	Penalties	Adjusted time ^{2}	Rank
20 km	Christian Poirot	1'14:54.2	6	1'20:54.2	23
20 km	Francis Mougel	1'13:20.5	7	1'20:20.5	21
20 km	Yvon Mougel	1'10:53.1	4	1'14:53.1	4

Men's 4 x 7.5 km relay

Athletes	Race		
Athletes	Misses ^{1}	Time	Rank
Francis Mougel; Éric Claudon; Yvon Mougel; Christian Poirot	3	1'43:57.6	9

^{1} A penalty loop of 150 metres had to be skied per missed target.
^{2} One minute added per missed target.

== Bobsleigh ==
Sled	Athletes	Event	Run 1		Run 2		Run 3		Run 4		Total	
Sled	Athletes	Event	Time	Rank	Time	Rank	Time	Rank	Time	Rank	Time	Rank
FRA-1	Gérard Christaud-Pipola; Patrick Lachaud	Two-man	n/a	?	n/a	?	n/a	?	DNF	–	DNF	–

Sled	Athletes	Event	Run 1		Run 2		Run 3		Run 4		Total	
Sled	Athletes	Event	Time	Rank	Time	Rank	Time	Rank	Time	Rank	Time	Rank
FRA-1	Gérard Christaud-Pipola; Philippe Aurox; Philippe Stott; Patrick Lachaud	Four-man	50.77	10	51.51	17	51.50	15	51.48	13	3:25.26	13

== Cross-country skiing ==
Men

Event	Athlete	Race	
Event	Athlete	Time	Rank
15 km	Jean-Denis Jaussaud	45:44.4	44
15 km	Dominique Locatelli	44:07.5	31
30 km	Jean-Denis Jaussaud	1'38:48.1	42
30 km	Dominique Locatelli	1'33:25.3	18
50 km	Dominique Locatelli	2'26:21.3	28

== Figure skating ==
Men

Athlete	CF	SP	FS	TFP	Rank
Laurent Depouilly	14	13	16	29.6	15
Jean-Christophe Simond	2	4	9	11.8	6

Women

Athlete	CF	SP	FS	TFP	Rank
Agnès Gosselin	18	19	17	35.4	18

Ice Dancing

Athletes	CD	OD	FD	TFP	Rank
Nathalie Herve; Pierre Bechu	13	14	15	28.6	14

== Ski jumping ==
Athlete	Event	Jump 1		Jump 2		Total	
Athlete	Event	Distance	Points	Distance	Points	Points	Rank
Gérard Colin	Normal hill	84.5	98.7	83.0	93.8	192.5	15
Gérard Colin	Large hill	90.0	71.2	101.0	92.6	163.8	32

== Speed skating ==
Men

Event	Athlete	Race	
Event	Athlete	Time	Rank
500 m	Hans van Helden	39.71	24
1000 m	Hans van Helden	1:18.77	18
1500 m	Hans van Helden	1:59.39	4
5000 m	Jean-Noël Fagot	7:44.60	31
5000 m	Hans van Helden	7:24.59	11
10,000 m	Jean-Noël Fagot	15:59.65	31
10,000 m	Hans van Helden	15:26.10	25
