= Bobsleigh at the 1984 Winter Olympics – Two-man =

Two-man at the XIV Olympic Winter Games
- Bobsleigh
- Venue: Sarajevo Olympic Bobsleigh and Luge Track
- Dates: February 10 — 11, 1984
- Competitors: 56 from 16 nations
- Winning time: 3:25.56

Medalists
1st place, gold medalist(s)		East Germany; Wolfgang Hoppe, Dietmar Schauerhammer
2nd place, silver medalist(s)		East Germany; Bernhard Lehmann, Bogdan Musioł
3rd place, bronze medalist(s)		Soviet Union; Zintis Ekmanis, Vladimir Aleksandrov

The Men's two-man bobsleigh competition at the 1984 Winter Olympics in Sarajevo, Yugoslavia was held on 10 and 11 February, at the Sarajevo Olympic Bobsleigh and Luge Track on the mountain of Trebević. This was one of two bobsleigh events at these games.

== Results ==
27 of the 28 two-man teams entered for the event completed all four runs

Rank	Country	Athletes	Run 1	Run 2	Run 3	Run 4	Total
Gold medal	East Germany (GDR-2)	Wolfgang Hoppe; Dietmar Schauerhammer	51.51	51.93	51.06	51.06	3:25.56
Silver medal	East Germany (GDR-1)	Bernhard Lehmann; Bogdan Musioł	51.59	51.94	51.15	51.36	3:26.04
Bronze medal	Soviet Union (URS-2)	Zintis Ekmanis; Vladimir Aleksandrov	51.56	52.10	51.24	51.26	3:26.16
4	Soviet Union (URS-1)	Jānis Ķipurs; Aivars Šnepsts	52.06	51.92	51.30	51.14	3:26.42
5	Switzerland (SUI-1)	Hans Hiltebrand; Meinrad Müller	51.73	52.21	51.35	51.47	3:26.76
6	Switzerland (SUI-2)	Ralph Pichler; Rico Freiermuth	52.21	52.21	51.84	51.97	3:28.23
7	Italy (ITA-1)	Guerrino Ghedina; Andrea Meneghin	52.40	52.46	51.82	52.41	3:29.09
8	West Germany (FRG-1)	Anton Fischer; Hans Metzler	52.29	52.25	52.18	52.46	3:29.18
9	Italy (ITA-2)	Marco Bellodis; Stefano Ticci	52.69	52.73	52.28	52.32	3:30.02
10	Great Britain (GBR-2)	Gomer Lloyd; Peter Brugnani	52.80	52.73	52.26	52.57	3:30.36
11	West Germany (FRG-2)	Andreas Weikenstorfer; Hans-Jürgen Hartmann	52.31	53.05	52.60	52.45	3:30.41
12	Austria (AUT-1)	Walter Delle Karth; Hans Lindner	52.61	53.01	52.33	52.64	3:30.59
13	Austria (AUT-2)	Peter Kienast; Christian Mark	52.79	52.97	52.42	52.47	3:30.65
14	Canada	Alan MacLachlan; Robert Wilson	52.77	53.04	52.14	52.79	3:30.74
15	United States (USA-1)	Brent Rushlaw; James Tyler	53.01	52.99	52.35	52.40	3:30.75
16	Netherlands	Job van Oostrum; John Drost	52.86	53.58	52.79	52.76	3:31.99
17	United States (USA-2)	Frederick Fritsch; Wayne DeAtley	53.47	53.32	52.63	52.78	3:32.20
18	Romania (ROU-2)	Ion Duminicel; Costel Petrariu	53.18	53.26	52.63	53.29	3:32.36
19	Sweden	Carl-Erik Eriksson; Nils Stefansson	53.13	53.56	53.04	52.88	3:32.61
20	Japan (JPN-1)	Hiroshi Okachi; Yuji Yaku	53.29	53.37	53.15	53.15	3:32.96
21	Great Britain (GBR-1)	Tom De La Hunty; Peter Lund	53.17	53.34	53.53	53.09	3:33.13
22	Yugoslavia (YUG-2)	Zdravko Stojnić; Siniša Tubić	53.76	54.09	52.82	53.05	3:34.02
23	Romania (ROU-1)	Dorin Degan; Cornel Popescu	53.90	53.57	53.18	53.41	3:34.06
24	Yugoslavia (YUG-1)	Boris Rađenović; Nikola Korica	53.85	54.01	53.05	53.22	3:34.13
25	Chinese Taipei (TPE-1)	Wu Dien-cheng; Chen Chin-san	53.90	53.64	53.08	53.71	3:34.35
26	Chinese Taipei (TPE-2)	Wu Chung-chou; Hwang Chi-fang	54.53	54.12	53.35	53.44	3:35.44
27	Japan (JPN-2)	Yuji Funayama; Satoshi Sugawara	54.52	54.23	53.50	53.88	3:36.13
	France	Gérard Christaud-Pipola; Patrick Lachaud					DNF
