= Korica =

Korica is a Serbo-Croatian surname. Notable people with the surname include:

- Dane Korica (born 1945), Serbian long-distance runner
- Nikola Korica (born 1960), Bosnian bobsledder
