= Nick Phipps =

Nick Phipps may refer to:

- Nick Phipps (rugby union) (born 1989), Australian rugby union player
- Nick Phipps (bobsleigh) (1952–2024), British bobsledder
