= Matt Roy =

Matt Roy may refer to:

- Matt Roy (bobsleigh) (fl. 1980s), American Olympic bobsledder
- Matt Roy (ice hockey) (born 1995), American ice hockey player
- Mathieu Roy (ice hockey, born 1983), Canadian ice hockey player
- Mathieu Roy (ice hockey, born 1986), Canadian ice hockey player

== See also ==
- Mat Roy Thompson (1874–1962), American civil engineer and architect
