= Briski =

Briski is a surname. Notable people with the surname include:

- Joe Briski (born 1955), American bobsledder
- Mariana Briski (1965–2014), Argentine actress, director, producer, screenwriter, author, and professor
- Norman Briski (born 1938), Argentine theatre actor, director, and playwright
- Zana Briski (born 1966), English photographer, filmmaker, and activist
