= Eisenreich =

Eisenreich is a German surname. Notable people with the surname include:

- Georg Eisenreich (born 1970), German politician
- Jim Eisenreich (born 1959), American baseball player
- Uwe Eisenreich (born 1958), German bobsledder
