= Lanišek =

Lanišek is a Slovenian surname. Notable people with the surname include:

- Andrej Lanišek (born 1957), Slovenian biathlete
- Anže Lanišek (born 1996), Slovenian ski jumper
