= Rihards Kotāns =

Latvian bobsledder

Personal information
- Nationality: Latvian
- Born: 10 March 1956; Līvāni, Latvian SSR, Soviet Union
- Died: 20 March 2010 (aged 54)

Sport
- Sport: Bobsleigh

Rihards Kotāns (10 March 1956 – 20 March 2010) was a Latvian bobsledder. He competed in the four man event at the 1984 Winter Olympics, representing the Soviet Union.
