= Chris Lori =

Canadian bobsledder

Chris Lori (born July 24, 1962) is a Canadian bobsled driver who competed from the late 1980s to the late 1990s. Competing in four Winter Olympics, he earned his best finish of fourth in the four-man event at Albertville in 1992. Lori won the Bobsleigh Overall World Cup four-man championship in 1989-90. He won nine Crystal Globes for top three finishes in Overall World Cup final standings and totaled twenty two World Cup medals and fourteen Canadian Championship titles. He Lori was instrumental in establishing Canada as a world power in the sport of bobsledding.

In 1987, Lori cheated death in a horrific crash in Cervinia, Italy, a track now closed due to its high rate of severe injuries, where he broke two ribs, clavicle and nose, suffered severe lacerations requiring skin grafting on his face, shoulder, hands and thigh. The following year, he recovered to qualify for his first Olympic games.

In 1990, he and his team returned to Cervinia in the second to last World Cup race of the year where they set the track record, putting the team in position to win the Overall World cup, which they accomplished by winning the final race in Calgary and becoming the first non-Europeans to win the Overall World Cup in bobsleigh.

Chris Lori also competed on Canada's National Track and Field Team in the decathlon event in 1980 (Jr.), 1983, 1984 and 1985, although he did not qualify for the Olympic games, before fully committing to bobsledding, which he started in October 1984. As a track and field athlete, Lori won a silver medal in the pole vault at the Jr. Nationals in 1980 and a silver medal at the Canadian University championships in 1984, and was awarded "All Canadian" honours.

Lori later became coach of the American bobsleigh team for the 2002 Winter Olympics in Salt Lake City where the USA four-man teams won Olympic silver and bronze.

His Olympic experience extends to becoming a part of the Canadian CTV Broadcast Team, as colour analyst, at the Vancouver/Whistler 2010 Olympic Winter Games.

Since 2001, Lori has become a foreign exchange trader, based in Singapore.
