= San Giacomo, Soragna =

Church building in Soragna, Italy

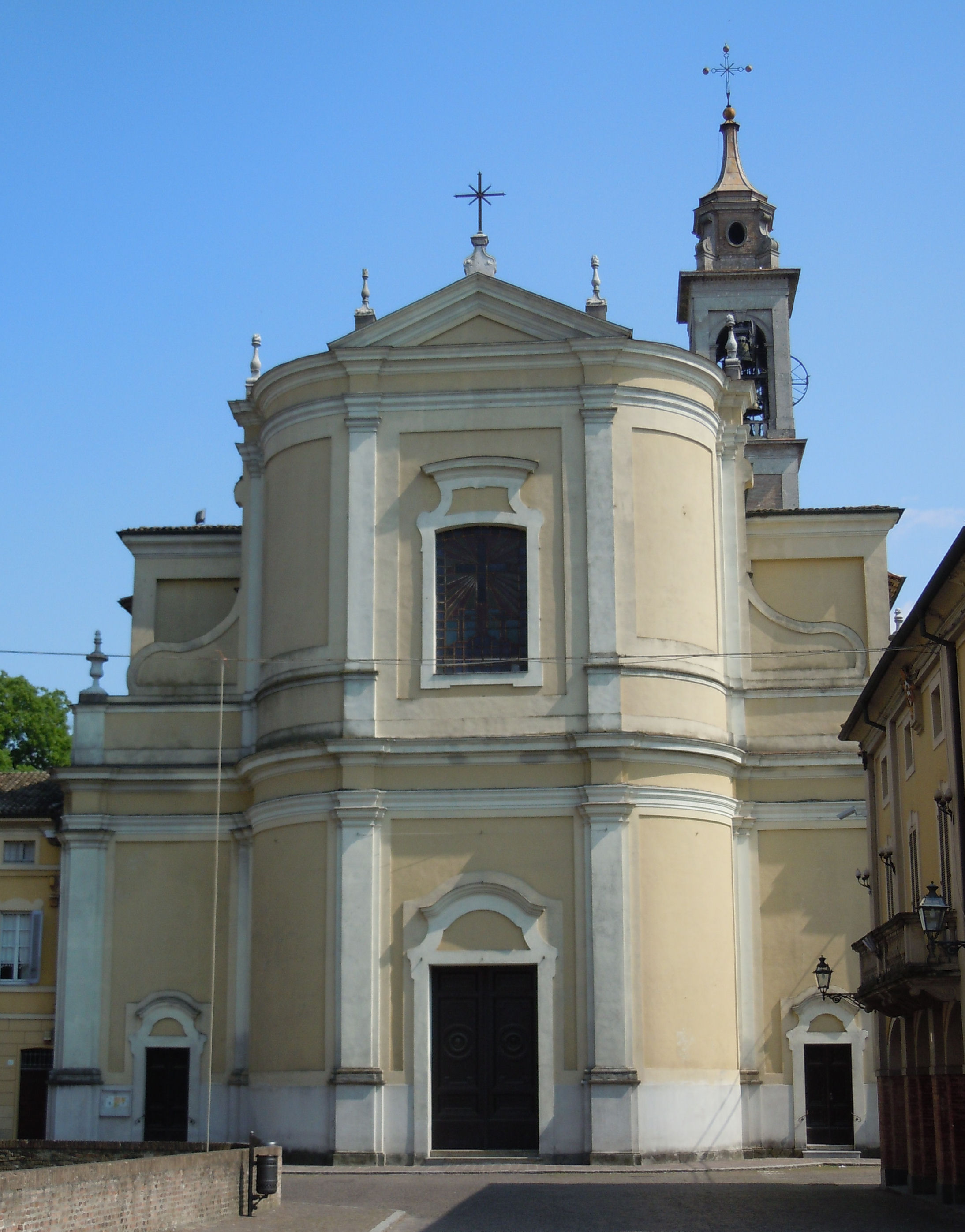
Church of San Giacomo.

San Giacomo is a Baroque style, Roman Catholic parish church in Soragna, province of Parma, Emilia-Romagna, northern Italy.

The church was built between 1755 and 1769, and is located near the Rocca Meli Lupi, the palatial home of the aristocratic lords of Soragno. The architect was Ottavio Bettoli, while the bell-tower (1826) was designed by Giuseppe Rasori. In 1939, it was made into a sanctuary.

The chapel to the left of the main altar, has a Madonna of Loreto with Saints Fermo, Lorenzo, and Lucia (1620) by Fortunato Gatti. The altar to the left of the chapel has a wooden statue Madonna Addolorata by Lorenzo Aili, while the altar has a marble group depicting the Dead Christ (1708) by Alvise da Cà. The sacristy has tapestries (1749) by Giulio Seletti and a credenza (1741) by Giovanni Battista Galli-Bibiena and Vincenzo Biazzi. The Baldacchino at the main altar was completed by Francesco Galli in 1811.
