= Günter Krispel =

Austrian bobsledder

Personal information
- Nationality: Austrian
- Born: 22 September 1951 (age 73)

Sport
- Sport: Bobsleigh

Günter Krispel (born 22 September 1951) is an Austrian bobsledder. He competed in the four man event at the 1984 Winter Olympics.
