= Marco Bellodis =

Italian bobsledder (born 1955)

Personal information
- Nationality: Italian
- Born: 23 February 1955 (age 70); Cortina d'Ampezzo, Italy

Sport
- Sport: Bobsleigh

Marco Bellodis (born 23 February 1955) is an Italian bobsledder. He competed in the two man event at the 1984 Winter Olympics.
