= Siniša Tubić =

Bosnian bobsledder

Personal information
- Nationality: Bosnian
- Born: 25 February 1960 (age 65); Sarajevo, Yugoslavia

Sport
- Sport: Bobsleigh

Siniša Tubić (born 25 February 1960) is a Bosnian bobsledder. He competed in the two man and the four man events at the 1984 Winter Olympics, representing Yugoslavia.
