= Michelle Coy =

British bobsledder

Michelle Coy (born 22 November 1971) is a British bobsledder from Bath who competed from 1993 to 2002. She is best known for her third place overall finish in the two-woman event for the 1998-99 Bobsleigh World Cup season.

Coy joined the Royal Air Force in 1990, and started competing in bobsleigh after taking course work from the RAF in the wake of watching the events during the 1992 Winter Olympics in Albertville.

She finished 11th in the two-woman event at the 2002 Winter Olympics in Salt Lake City.
