= Hwang Chi-fang =

Taiwanese bobsledder

Personal information
- Nationality: Taiwanese
- Born: 4 January 1965 (age 60); Tainan, Taiwan

Sport
- Sport: Bobsleigh

Hwang Chi-fang (born 4 January 1965) is a Taiwanese bobsledder. He competed in the two man event at the 1984 Winter Olympics. He placed 26th.
