= Peter Lund (bobsleigh) =

British bobsledder (born 1955)

Personal information
- Nationality: British
- Born: 24 February 1955 (age 70) Lusaka, Northern Rhodesia

Sport
- Sport: Bobsleigh

Peter Lund (born 24 February 1955) is a British bobsledder. He competed in the two man event at the 1984 Winter Olympics.
