= Bobsleigh World Cup =

Annual bobsleigh competition

IBSF Bobsleigh World Cup
- Genre: Bobsleigh
- Frequency: annual
- Inaugurated: 1985
- Website: www.ibsf.org IBSF
- 2025–26 Bobsleigh World Cup

The Bobsleigh World Cup is an annual bobsleigh competitions. It has taken place since the 1984 Winter Olympics. Below is a lists of season champions. Each table shows the country and pilot only.

== Men's ==
=== Combined ===
Debuted: 1985.

Season	Winner	Runner-up	Third place
1984–85	(West Germany) Anton Fischer	–	–
1985–86	(Switzerland) Ekkehard Fasser	(United States) Matt Roy	(United Kingdom) Nick Phipps
1986–87	(United States) Matt Roy	(East Germany) Wolfgang Hoppe	(West Germany) Anton Fischer
1987–88	(Austria) Ingo Appelt	(Soviet Union) Jānis Ķipurs	(East Germany) Volker Dietrich
1988–89	(Switzerland) Gustav Weder	(East Germany) Detlef Richter	(Switzerland) Nico Baracchi
1989–90	(Soviet Union) Māris Poikāns	(Canada) Chris Lori	(East Germany) Wolfgang Hoppe (West Germany) Christian Schebitz
1990–91	(Switzerland) Gustav Weder (2)	(Austria) Ingo Appelt	(Germany) Wolfgang Hoppe (Canada) Chris Lori
1991–92	(Germany) Wolfgang Hoppe	(Switzerland) Gustav Weder	(Canada) Chris Lori
1992–93	(United States) Brian Shimer	(Switzerland) Gustav Weder	(Italy) Günther Huber
1993–94	(Canada) Pierre Lueders	(Austria) Hubert Schösser	(United Kingdom) Mark Tout
1994–95	(Canada) Pierre Lueders	(Switzerland) Reto Götschi	(Italy) Günther Huber
1995–96	(Germany) Christoph Langen	(Canada) Pierre Lueders	(Canada) Chris Lori
1996–97	(Italy) Günther Huber	(United States) Brian Shimer	(Canada) Pierre Lueders
1997–98	(Canada) Pierre Lueders	(Italy) Günther Huber	(Latvia) Sandis Prūsis
1998–99	(Germany) Christoph Langen (2)	(Switzerland) Reto Götschi	(Canada) Pierre Lueders
1999–2000	(Switzerland) Marcel Rohner	(Switzerland) Christian Reich	(Canada) Pierre Lueders
2000–01	(Germany) André Lange	(Switzerland) Martin Annen	(Latvia) Sandis Prūsis
2001–02	(Switzerland) Martin Annen	(Switzerland) Christian Reich	(Germany) André Lange
2002–03	(Germany) André Lange	(Germany) René Spies	(Switzerland) Martin Annen
2003–04	(Germany) André Lange	(Canada) Pierre Lueders	(United States) Todd Hays
2004–05	(Switzerland) Martin Annen (2)	(Russia) Alexandr Zubkov	(Canada) Pierre Lueders
2005–06	(Canada) Pierre Lueders (4)	(Russia) Alexandr Zubkov	(United States) Todd Hays
2006–07	(United States) Steven Holcomb	(Canada) Pierre Lueders	(Germany) André Lange
2007–08	(Germany) André Lange (4)	(Russia) Alexandr Zubkov	(United States) Steven Holcomb
2008–09	(Russia) Alexandr Zubkov	(Switzerland) Beat Hefti	(Germany) André Lange
2009–10	(United States) Steven Holcomb	(Switzerland) Ivo Rüegg	(Germany) Thomas Florschütz
2010–11	(Germany) Manuel Machata	(Russia) Alexandr Zubkov	(United States) Steven Holcomb
2011–12	(Germany) Maximilian Arndt	(Russia) Alexandr Zubkov	(Germany) Manuel Machata
2012–13	(Latvia) Oskars Melbārdis	(Russia) Alexandr Zubkov	(Germany) Manuel Machata
2013–14	(United States) Steven Holcomb (3)	(Switzerland) Beat Hefti	(Germany) Thomas Florschütz
2014–15	(Latvia) Oskars Melbārdis (2)	(Switzerland) Rico Peter	(Germany) Nico Walther
2015–16	(Germany) Nico Walther	(Germany) Maximilian Arndt	(Switzerland) Rico Peter
2016–17	(Germany) Francesco Friedrich	(United States) Steven Holcomb	(Switzerland) Rico Peter
2017–18	(Canada) Justin Kripps	(Germany) Francesco Friedrich	(Germany) Johannes Lochner
2018–19	(Germany) Francesco Friedrich	(Latvia) Oskars Ķibermanis	(Germany) Nico Walther
2019–20	(Germany) Francesco Friedrich	(Canada) Justin Kripps	(Latvia) Oskars Ķibermanis
2020–21	(Germany) Francesco Friedrich	(Germany) Johannes Lochner	(Czech Republic) Dominik Dvořák
2021–22	(Germany) Francesco Friedrich	(Canada) Justin Kripps	(Russia) Rostislav Gaitiukevich
2022–23	(Germany) Francesco Friedrich	(Germany) Johannes Lochner	(United Kingdom) Brad Hall
2023–24	(Germany) Francesco Friedrich (7)	(Germany) Johannes Lochner	(Latvia) Emīls Cipulis
2024–25	(Germany) Johannes Lochner	(Germany) Francesco Friedrich	(United Kingdom) Brad Hall
2025–26	(Germany) Johannes Lochner	(Germany) Francesco Friedrich	(Germany) Adam Ammour

Medal table

Rank	Nation	Gold	Silver	Bronze	Total
1	Germany	20	10	16	46
2	Switzerland	6	11	4	21
3	Canada	5	6	7	18
4	United States	5	3	4	12
5	Latvia	2	1	4	7
6	Russia	1	6	1	8
7	Austria	1	2	0	3
8	Italy	1	1	2	4
9	Soviet Union	1	1	0	2
10	West Germany	1	0	2	3
11	East Germany	0	2	2	4
12	Great Britain	0	0	4	4
13	Czech Republic	0	0	1	1
Totals (13 entries)		43	43	47	133

=== Two-man ===
Unofficial event: 1985–1990. Debuted: 1991.

Season	Winner	Runner-up	Third place
1984–85	(West Germany) Anton Fischer	(United Kingdom) Nick Phipps	(Switzerland) Hans Hiltebrand
1985–86	(Soviet Union) Māris Poikāns	(Soviet Union) Vyacheslav Savlev	(Switzerland) Ekkehard Fasser
1986–87	(West Germany) Anton Fischer (2)	(United States) Matt Roy	(East Germany) Wolfgang Hoppe
1987–88	(Soviet Union) Jānis Ķipurs	(East Germany) Volker Dietrich	(Soviet Union) Zintis Ekmanis
1988–89	(Switzerland) Gustav Weder	(East Germany) Detlef Richter	(Switzerland) Nico Baracchi
1989–90	(West Germany) Christian Schebitz	(Canada) Greg Haydenluck	(Soviet Union) Māris Poikāns
1990–91	(Germany) Wolfgang Hoppe	(Switzerland) Gustav Weder	(Canada) Chris Lori
1991–92	(Italy) Günther Huber	(Switzerland) Gustav Weder	(Germany) Rudi Lochner
1992–93	(Italy) Günther Huber (2)	(Switzerland) Gustav Weder	(United States) Brian Shimer
1993–94	(Canada) Pierre Lueders	(Germany) Christoph Langen	(Italy) Günther Huber
1994–95	(Canada) Pierre Lueders	(Switzerland) Reto Götschi	(Italy) Günther Huber
1995–96	(Germany) Christoph Langen	(Canada) Pierre Lueders	(Germany) Sepp Dostthaler
1996–97	(Canada) Pierre Lueders	(Italy) Günther Huber	(United States) Brian Shimer
1997–98	(Canada) Pierre Lueders	(Italy) Günther Huber	(Latvia) Sandis Prūsis
1998–99	(Germany) Christoph Langen	(Switzerland) Reto Götschi	(Canada) Pierre Lueders
1999–2000	(Switzerland) Christian Reich	(Switzerland) Reto Götschi	(Switzerland) Marcel Rohner
2000–01	(Switzerland) Martin Annen	(Germany) René Spies	(Germany) André Lange
2001–02	(Switzerland) Martin Annen	(Canada) Pierre Lueders	(Switzerland) Christian Reich
2002–03	(Canada) Pierre Lueders	(Germany) René Spies	(Germany) André Lange
2003–04	(Germany) Christoph Langen (3)	(Canada) Pierre Lueders	(Germany) André Lange
2004–05	(Switzerland) Martin Annen (3)	(Canada) Pierre Lueders	(Russia) Alexandr Zubkov
2005–06	(Canada) Pierre Lueders (6)	(Russia) Alexandr Zubkov	(United States) Todd Hays
2006–07	(United States) Steven Holcomb	(Canada) Pierre Lueders	(Germany) André Lange
2007–08	(Germany) André Lange	(Switzerland) Ivo Rüegg	(Russia) Alexandr Zubkov
2008–09	(Switzerland) Beat Hefti	(Germany) André Lange	(Germany) Thomas Florschütz
2009–10	(Switzerland) Ivo Rüegg	(Germany) Thomas Florschütz	(Germany) Karl Angerer
2010–11	(Russia) Alexandr Zubkov	(Germany) Manuel Machata	(Italy) Simone Bertazzo
2011–12	(Switzerland) Beat Hefti (2)	(Germany) Maximilian Arndt	(Russia) Alexandr Zubkov
2012–13	(Canada) Lyndon Rush	(Latvia) Oskars Melbārdis	(Germany) Manuel Machata
2013–14	(United States) Steven Holcomb (2)	(Switzerland) Beat Hefti	(Germany) Francesco Friedrich
2014–15	(Latvia) Oskars Melbārdis	(Switzerland) Beat Hefti	(Switzerland) Rico Peter
2015–16	(South Korea) Won Yun-jong	(Germany) Nico Walther	(Latvia) Uģis Žaļims
2016–17	(Germany) Francesco Friedrich	(United States) Steven Holcomb	(South Korea) Won Yun-jong
2017–18	(Canada) Justin Kripps	(Germany) Francesco Friedrich	(Canada) Christopher Spring
2018–19	(Germany) Francesco Friedrich	(Latvia) Oskars Ķibermanis	(Germany) Nico Walther
2019–20	(Germany) Francesco Friedrich	(Latvia) Oskars Ķibermanis	(Canada) Justin Kripps
2020–21	(Germany) Francesco Friedrich	(Germany) Johannes Lochner	(Czech Republic) Dominik Dvořák
2021–22	(Germany) Francesco Friedrich	(Canada) Justin Kripps	(Russia) Rostislav Gaitiukevich
2022–23	(Germany) Johannes Lochner	(Germany) Francesco Friedrich	(United Kingdom) Brad Hall
2023–24	(Germany) Francesco Friedrich (6)	(Germany) Johannes Lochner	(Germany) Adam Ammour
2024–25	(Germany) Johannes Lochner	(United Kingdom) Brad Hall	(Germany) Francesco Friedrich
2025–26	(Germany) Johannes Lochner (3)	(Germany) Francesco Friedrich	(Germany) Adam Ammour

Medal table

Rank	Nation	Gold	Silver	Bronze	Total
1	Germany	17	15	15	47
2	Switzerland	8	9	6	23
3	Canada	8	7	4	19
4	West Germany	3	0	0	3
5	Italy	2	2	3	7
5	United States	2	2	3	7
7	Soviet Union	2	1	2	5
8	Latvia	1	3	2	6
9	Russia	1	1	4	6
10	South Korea	1	0	1	2
11	East Germany	0	2	1	3
11	Great Britain	0	2	1	3
13	Czech Republic	0	0	1	1
Totals (13 entries)		45	44	43	132

=== Four-man ===
Unofficial event: 1985–1990. Debuted: 1991.

Season	Winner	Runner-up	Third place
1984–85	(United States) Jeffrey Jost	(United Kingdom) Nick Phipps	(Switzerland) Silvio Giobellina
1985–86	(Switzerland) Ekkehard Fasser	(Austria) Walter Delle Karth	(United States) Matt Roy
1986–87	(United States) Matt Roy	(East Germany) Wolfgang Hoppe	(Austria) Peter Kienast
1987–88	(Austria) Ingo Appelt (Austria) Peter Kienast	none awarded	(East Germany) Volker Dietrich
1988–89	(Austria) Ingo Appelt (2)	(Switzerland) Gustav Weder	(Austria) Peter Kienast
1989–90	(Canada) Chris Lori	(Soviet Union) Māris Poikāns	(East Germany) Dietmar Falkenberg
1990–91	(Switzerland) Gustav Weder	(Austria) Ingo Appelt	(Canada) Chris Lori
1991–92	(Germany) Wolfgang Hoppe	(Switzerland) Gustav Weder	(United Kingdom) Mark Tout
1992–93	(United States) Brian Shimer	(Canada) Chris Lori	(Germany) Wolfgang Hoppe
1993–94	(Austria) Hubert Schösser	(Germany) Dirk Wiese	(United Kingdom) Mark Tout
1994–95	(Canada) Pierre Lueders	(United Kingdom) Mark Tout	(Germany) Dirk Wiese
1995–96	(Germany) Wolfgang Hoppe (2)	(Germany) Christoph Langen	(Canada) Chris Lori
1996–97	(Switzerland) Marcel Rohner	(Germany) Wolfgang Hoppe	(Italy) Günther Huber
1997–98	(Germany) Harald Czudaj	(Switzerland) Marcel Rohner	(Austria) Hubert Schösser
1998–99	(Germany) Christoph Langen	(Switzerland) Marcel Rohner	(Germany) André Lange
1999–2000	(Switzerland) Marcel Rohner (2)	(Latvia) Sandis Prūsis	(Canada) Pierre Lueders
2000–01	(Germany) André Lange	(Latvia) Sandis Prūsis	(Germany) Matthias Benesch
2001–02	(Switzerland) Martin Annen	(Germany) André Lange	(Switzerland) Christian Reich
2002–03	(Germany) André Lange	(Latvia) Sandis Prūsis	(Switzerland) Ralph Rüegg
2003–04	(Germany) André Lange	(Russia) Alexandr Zubkov	(United States) Todd Hays
2004–05	(Russia) Alexandr Zubkov	(Switzerland) Martin Annen	(Canada) Pierre Lueders
2005–06	(Russia) Alexandr Zubkov	(Canada) Pierre Lueders	(Switzerland) Martin Annen
2006–07	(Russia) Yevgeni Popov	(United States) Steven Holcomb	(Switzerland) Martin Annen
2007–08	(Germany) André Lange (4)	(Russia) Alexandr Zubkov	(Latvia) Jānis Miņins
2008–09	(Russia) Alexandr Zubkov	(Latvia) Jānis Miņins	(Germany) André Lange
2009–10	(United States) Steve Holcomb	(Latvia) Jānis Miņins	(Germany) André Lange
2010–11	(Germany) Manuel Machata	(United States) Steven Holcomb	(Russia) Alexandr Zubkov
2011–12	(Russia) Alexandr Zubkov	(Germany) Maximilian Arndt	(Germany) Manuel Machata
2012–13	(Russia) Alexandr Zubkov (5)	(Latvia) Oskars Melbārdis	(Germany) Manuel Machata
2013–14	(Germany) Maximilian Arndt	(United States) Steven Holcomb	(Germany) Thomas Florschütz
2014–15	(Latvia) Oskars Melbārdis	(Germany) Maximilian Arndt	(Germany) Nico Walther
2015–16	(Germany) Maximilian Arndt (2)	(Germany) Francesco Friedrich	(Switzerland) Rico Peter
2016–17	(Switzerland) Rico Peter	(United States) Steven Holcomb	(Germany) Nico Walther
2017–18	(Germany) Johannes Lochner	(Germany) Francesco Friedrich	(Canada) Justin Kripps
2018–19	(Germany) Francesco Friedrich	(Latvia) Oskars Ķibermanis	(Germany) Johannes Lochner
2019–20	(Germany) Francesco Friedrich	(Germany) Johannes Lochner	(Canada) Justin Kripps
2020–21	(Germany) Francesco Friedrich	(Austria) Benjamin Maier	(Canada) Justin Kripps
2021–22	(Germany) Francesco Friedrich	(Canada) Justin Kripps	(Russia) Rostislav Gaitiukevich
2022–23	(Germany) Francesco Friedrich	(United Kingdom) Brad Hall	(Germany) Johannes Lochner
2023–24	(Germany) Francesco Friedrich	(Latvia) Emīls Cipulis	(Germany) Johannes Lochner
2024–25	(Germany) Francesco Friedrich (7)	(Germany) Johannes Lochner	(United Kingdom) Brad Hall
2025–26	(Germany) Johannes Lochner (2)	(Germany) Francesco Friedrich	(Germany) Adam Ammour

Medal table

Rank	Nation	Gold	Silver	Bronze	Total
1	Germany	20	12	17	49
2	Switzerland	6	5	6	17
3	Russia	6	2	2	10
4	United States	4	4	2	10
5	Austria	4	3	3	10
6	Canada	2	3	7	12
7	Latvia	1	8	1	10
8	Great Britain	0	3	3	6
9	East Germany	0	1	2	3
10	Soviet Union	0	1	0	1
11	Italy	0	0	1	1
Totals (11 entries)		43	42	44	129

== Women's ==
=== Combined ===
Debuted: 2022.

Season	Winner	Runner-up	Third place
2021–22	(United States) Elana Meyers Taylor	(Germany) Laura Nolte	(Canada) Christine de Bruin
2022–23	(United States) Kaillie Humphries	(Germany) Laura Nolte	(Germany) Kim Kalicki
2023–24	(Germany) Laura Nolte	(Germany) Lisa Buckwitz	(Switzerland) Melanie Hasler
2024–25	(Germany) Laura Nolte	(Germany) Lisa Buckwitz	(Germany) Kim Kalicki
2025–26	(Germany) Laura Nolte (3)	(United States) Kaillie Humphries	(Germany) Lisa Buckwitz

=== Medal table ===
Rank	Nation	Gold	Silver	Bronze	Total
1	Germany	3	4	3	10
2	United States	2	1	0	3
3	Canada	0	0	1	1
3	Switzerland	0	0	1	1
Totals (4 entries)		5	5	5	15

=== Monobob ===
Debuted: 2021.

Season	Winner	Runner-up	Third place
2020–21	(United States) Nicole Vogt	(Australia) Breeana Walker	(Brazil) Marina Silva Tuono
2021–22	(United States) Elana Meyers Taylor	(United States) Kaillie Humphries	(Canada) Cynthia Appiah
2022–23	(United States) Kaillie Humphries	(Germany) Laura Nolte	(Canada) Cynthia Appiah
2023–24	(Germany) Lisa Buckwitz	(Australia) Breeana Walker	(Germany) Laura Nolte
2024–25	(Germany) Lisa Buckwitz (2)	(Australia) Breeana Walker	(Germany) Laura Nolte
2025–26	(Germany) Laura Nolte	(Australia) Breeana Walker	(Germany) Lisa Buckwitz

=== Medal table ===
Rank	Nation	Gold	Silver	Bronze	Total
1	Germany	3	1	3	7
2	United States	3	1	0	4
3	Australia	0	4	0	4
4	Canada	0	0	2	2
5	Brazil	0	0	1	1
Totals (5 entries)		6	6	6	18

=== Two-woman ===
Debuted: 1994.

Season	Winner	Runner-up	Third place
1993–94	(Switzerland) Barbara Muriset	–	–
1994–95	(Switzerland) Claudia Bühlmann	–	–
1995–96	(Switzerland) Françoise Burdet	–	–
1996–97	(Switzerland) Françoise Burdet	–	–
1997–98	(Switzerland) Françoise Burdet	–	–
1998–99	(Switzerland) Françoise Burdet (4)	(United States) Jean Racine	(United Kingdom) Michelle Coy
1999–2000	(United States) Jean Racine	(United States) Jill Bakken	(Switzerland) Françoise Burdet
2000–01	(United States) Jean Racine (2)	(Germany) Sandra Prokoff	(United States) Bonny Warner
2001–02	(Germany) Susi Erdmann	(Germany) Sandra Prokoff	(United States) Jean Racine
2002–03	(Germany) Susi Erdmann (2)	(Germany) Sandra Prokoff	(Italy) Gerda Weissensteiner
2003–04	(Germany) Sandra Prokoff	(United States) Jean Racine	(Germany) Susi Erdmann (Italy) Gerda Weissensteiner
2004–05	(Germany) Sandra Prokoff-Kiriasis	(Germany) Cathleen Martini	(Germany) Susi Erdmann
2005–06	(Germany) Sandra Kiriasis	(Canada) Helen Upperton	(United States) Shauna Rohbock
2006–07	(Germany) Sandra Kiriasis	(United States) Shauna Rohbock	(Germany) Cathleen Martini
2007–08	(Germany) Sandra Kiriasis	(Germany) Cathleen Martini	(Canada) Helen Upperton
2008–09	(Germany) Sandra Kiriasis	(Germany) Cathleen Martini	(United Kingdom) Nicole Minichiello
2009–10	(Germany) Sandra Kiriasis	(Canada) Kaillie Humphries	(Germany) Cathleen Martini
2010–11	(Germany) Sandra Kiriasis (8)	(Germany) Cathleen Martini	(Canada) Kaillie Humphries
2011–12	(Germany) Cathleen Martini	(Germany) Anja Schneiderheinze	(Germany) Sandra Kiriasis
2012–13	(Canada) Kaillie Humphries	(Germany) Sandra Kiriasis	(Germany) Cathleen Martini
2013–14	(Canada) Kaillie Humphries	(United States) Elana Meyers	(United States) Jamie Greubel
2014–15	(United States) Elana Meyers	(Canada) Kaillie Humphries	(United States) Jazmine Fenlator
2015–16	(Canada) Kaillie Humphries	(United States) Jamie Greubel Poser	(Austria) Christina Hengster
2016–17	(United States) Jamie Greubel Poser	(Canada) Kaillie Humphries	(United States) Elana Meyers Taylor
2017–18	(Canada) Kaillie Humphries (4)	(United States) Elana Meyers Taylor	(Germany) Mariama Jamanka
2018–19	(Germany) Mariama Jamanka	(Germany) Stephanie Schneider	(United States) Elana Meyers Taylor
2019–20	(Germany) Stephanie Schneider	(Germany) Mariama Jamanka	(Canada) Christine de Bruin
2020–21	(Austria) Katrin Beierl	(Germany) Kim Kalicki	(Germany) Mariama Jamanka
2021–22	(United States) Elana Meyers Taylor (2)	(Germany) Laura Nolte	(Germany) Kim Kalicki
2022–23	(Germany) Laura Nolte	(Germany) Kim Kalicki	(United States) Kaillie Humphries
2023–24	(Germany) Laura Nolte	(Germany) Kim Kalicki	(Germany) Lisa Buckwitz
2024–25	(Germany) Laura Nolte (3)	(Germany) Kim Kalicki	(Germany) Lisa Buckwitz

=== Medal table ===
Rank	Nation	Gold	Silver	Bronze	Total
1	Germany	16	16	11	43
2	Switzerland	6	0	1	7
3	United States	5	7	8	20
4	Canada	4	4	3	11
5	Austria	1	0	1	2
6	Great Britain	0	0	2	2
6	Italy	0	0	2	2
Totals (7 entries)		32	27	28	87

== All-time medal count ==
Rank	Nation	Gold	Silver	Bronze	Total
1	Germany	78	52	59	189
2	Switzerland	26	25	18	69
3	United States	21	17	17	55
4	Canada	19	20	24	63
5	Russia	8	9	7	24
6	Austria	6	5	4	15
7	Latvia	4	12	7	23
8	West Germany	4	0	2	6
9	Italy	3	3	8	14
10	Soviet Union	3	3	2	8
11	South Korea	1	0	1	2
12	Great Britain	0	5	10	15
13	East Germany	0	5	5	10
14	Australia	0	3	0	3
15	Czech Republic	0	0	2	2
16	Brazil	0	0	1	1
Totals (16 entries)		173	159	167	499

Rank	Athlete	Gold	Silver	Bronze	Total
1	(Germany) Francesco Friedrich	20	8	2	30
2	(Canada) Pierre Lueders	11	9	7	27
3	(Germany) André Lange	9	2	10	21
4	(Germany) Sandra Kiriasis (Prokoff)	8	4	1	13
5	(Russia) Alexandr Zubkov	7	9	4	20
6	(Germany) Laura Nolte	7	4	2	13
7	(Germany) Johannes Lochner	6	7	4	17
8	(United States) Steven Holcomb	6	6	2	14
9	(Canada) (United States) Kaillie Humphries	6	4	2	12
10	(Switzerland) Martin Annen	6	2	3	11
