= Umberto Prato =

Italian bobsledder (born 1959)

Personal information
- Nationality: Italian
- Born: 10 January 1959 (age 66); Merano, Italy

Sport
- Sport: Bobsleigh

Umberto Prato (born 10 January 1959) is an Italian bobsledder. He competed in the four-man event at the 1984 Winter Olympics.
