= Oratory of Sant'Antonio da Padova, Soragna =

Oratory in Soragna, Italy

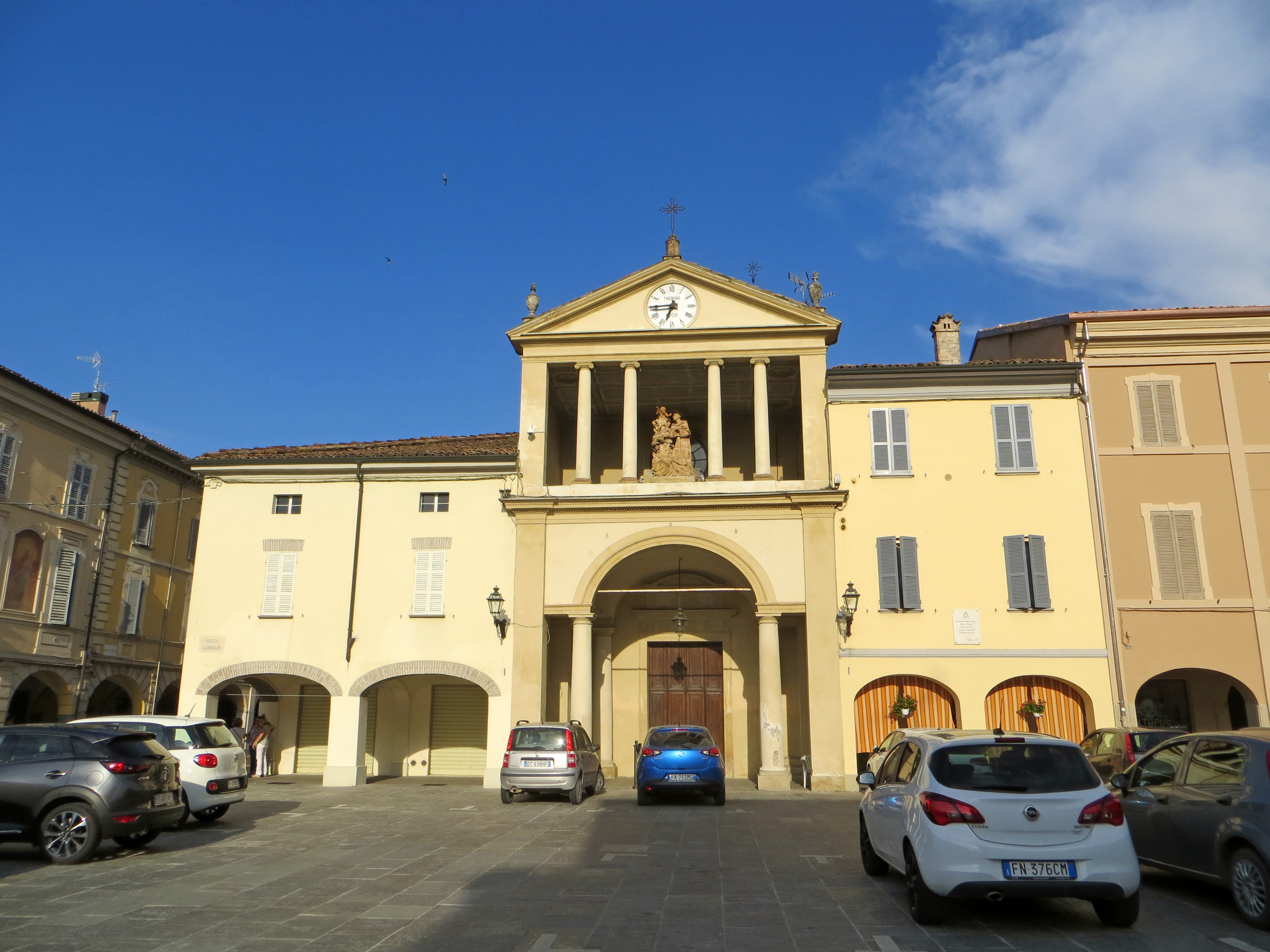
Façade

The Oratorio di Sant'Antonio da Padova is a prayer hall located facing the main piazza in the town center of Soragna, Province of Parma, Italy.

The Oratory was designed in 1696 by Francesco Galli Bibiena, as part of the complex of the Church of the Suffragio. It interior is rectangular with a semicircular apse. The interior stucco decoration was made in 1698 by Giovanni Mercoli (1698). The lateral altars have depicting a Massacre of the Infants (1698) and Madonna and Saints by Giovanni Bolla. The musical organ by G. Diotti dates to 1701. The wooden main altar was sculpted by Giulio Seletti. The façade with its peculiar second-story colonnade has a terracotta statue (1806) by Giuseppe Carra.
