= Frank Hansen (bobsleigh) =

American bobsledder

Personal information
- Born: August 9, 1952 (age 73) Albany, New York, United States

Sport
- Sport: Bobsleigh

Frank Hansen (born August 9, 1952) is an American bobsledder. He competed in the four man event at the 1984 Winter Olympics. Hansen was diagnosed with amyotrophic lateral sclerosis in his 60s.
