= Hans Märchy =

Swiss bobsledder (born 1955)

Personal information
- Nationality: Swiss
- Born: 13 July 1955 (age 69); Näfels, Switzerland

Sport
- Sport: Bobsleigh

Hans Märchy (born 13 July 1955) is a Swiss bobsledder. He competed in the four man event at the 1984 Winter Olympics.
