= Beata Vergine del Carmine e San Rocco, Soragna =

Church building in Soragna, Italy

Coordinates: 44.9287°N 10.1223°E

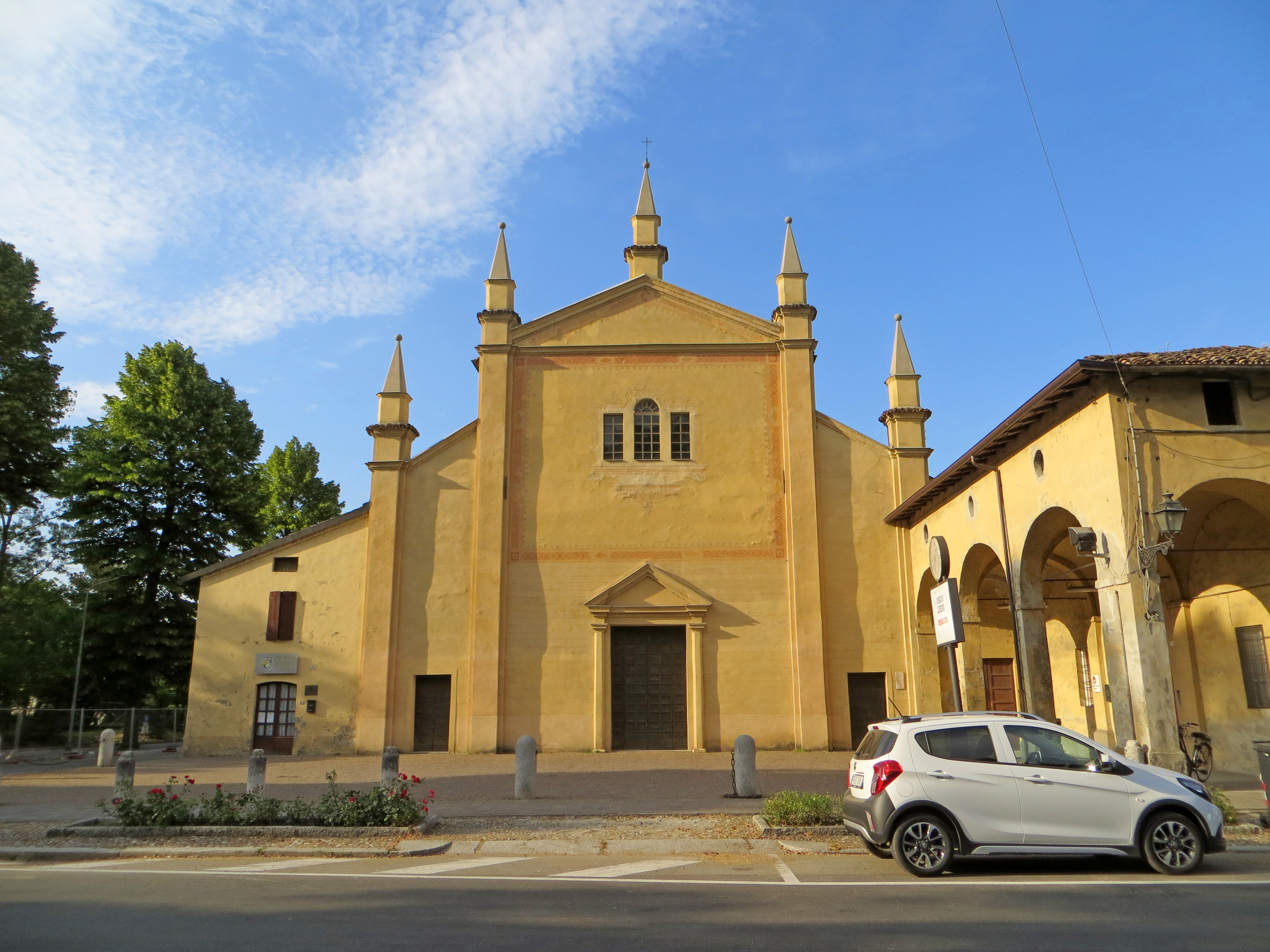
Façade

The Chiesa della Beata Vergine del Carmine e San Rocco is a church in the town of Soragna, Province of Parma, Italy.

The church was commissioned in 1661 by the marchese Diofebo III Meli Lupi for the Carmelites. The main altar of polychrome marble has statues of the Madonna del Carmine and child. The interior has an altar with a painted statue of Saint Roch. The organ (1707) was built by Fra Giuseppe Dotti and the organ loft was designed by Giambattista Galli.
