= Clarke Flynn =

Canadian bobsledder

Personal information
- Nationality: Canadian
- Born: 7 August 1959 (age 65); Jever, Germany

Sport
- Sport: Bobsleigh

Clarke Flynn (born 7 August 1959) is a Canadian bobsledder. He competed in the four man event at the 1984 Winter Olympics.
