= Job van Oostrum =

Dutch bobsledder

Personal information
- Nationality: Dutch
- Born: 2 March 1954 (age 71); Utrecht, Netherlands

Sport
- Sport: Bobsleigh

Job van Oostrum (born 2 March 1954) is a Dutch bobsledder. He competed in the two man event at the 1984 Winter Olympics.
