= Santa Caterina d'Alessandria, Soragna =

Church building in Soragna, Italy

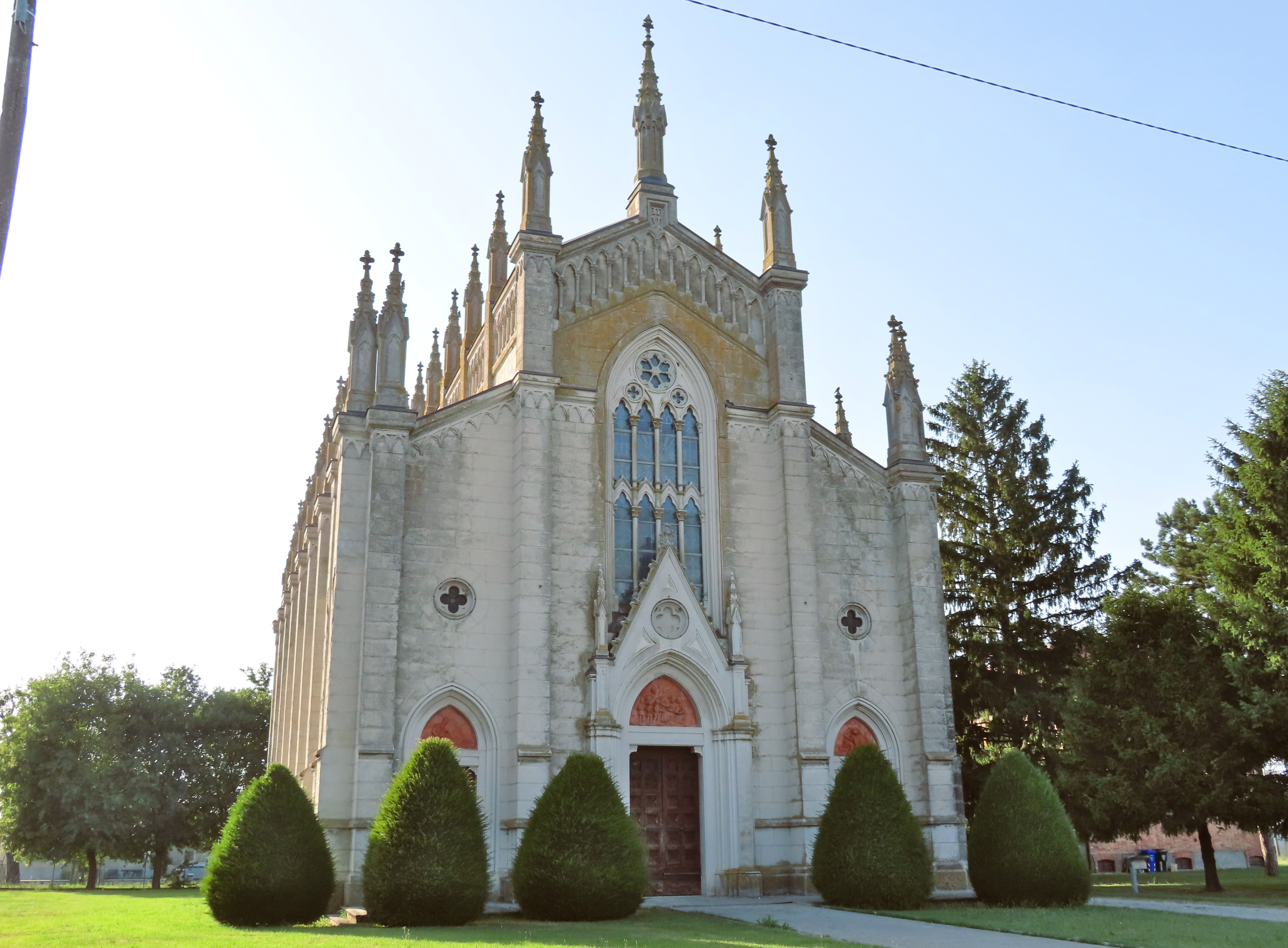
Façade

Santa Caterina d'Alessandria is a Roman Catholic church in the frazione of Diolo outside the town of Soragna, Province of Parma, Italy.

The church was built in 1914-1917 near the site of a prior 16th-century church. The church was erected in Gothic Revival style. The Bishop of Parma Monsignor Guido Maria Conforti blessed the first stone, dedicating the church to Young Jesus Prince of Peace. The 16th-century bell-tower of the prior parish church is nearby.
