= Françoise Burdet =

Swiss bobsledder (born 1967)

Medal record

Bobsleigh

Representing Switzerland

World Championships
Gold medal – first place	2001 Calgary	Two-woman
Bronze medal – third place	2000 Winterberg	Two-woman

European Championships
Bronze medal – third place	2004 Sigulda	Two-woman

Françoise Burdet (born 12 August 1967) is a Swiss bobsledder who competed from 1992 to 2005. She won two medals in the two-woman event at the FIBT World Championships with a gold in 2001 and a bronze in 2000.

Burdet won the Bobsleigh World Cup season titles four straight years in the two-woman event (1995–96, 1996–97, 1997–98, 1998–99).

She also finished fourth in the two-woman event at the 2002 Winter Olympics in Salt Lake City.
