= Vyacheslav Savlev =

Soviet bobsledder

Vyacheslav Savlev is a former Soviet bobsledder who competed in the mid-1980s. He is best known for finishing runner-up in the two-man event for the 1985–86 Bobsleigh World Cup season.
