= Meinrad Müller =

Swiss bobsledder (born 1961)

Personal information
- Nationality: Swiss
- Born: 7 November 1961 (age 63); Koblenz, Switzerland

Sport
- Sport: Bobsleigh

Meinrad Müller (born 7 November 1961) is a Swiss bobsledder. He competed in the two man event at the 1984 Winter Olympics.
