= Tom Barnes (bobsleigh) =

American bobsledder

Personal information
- Born: September 5, 1959 (age 66) Fairfield, California, United States

Sport
- Sport: Bobsleigh

Tom Barnes (born September 5, 1959) is an American bobsledder. He competed in the four man event at the 1984 Winter Olympics.
