= Fortunato Gatti =

Italian painter

Fortunato Gatti (active early 17th century) was an Italian painter active near Parma and Modena.

He painted a Madonna of Loreto with Saints Fermo, Lorenzo, and Lucia (1620) in the church of San Giacomo, Soragna.
