= Gus McKenzie =

British hurdler and bobsledder

Personal information
- Born: 29 December 1954 (age 70) Edinburgh, Scotland

Sport
- Sport: Bobsleigh, athletics

Angus Carl Alexander "Gus" McKenzie (born 29 December 1954) is a retired Scottish hurdler and bobsledder. He competed in the four man event at the 1984 Winter Olympics.
