= Rocca Meli Lupi =

Coordinates: 44.9273°N 10.1224°E

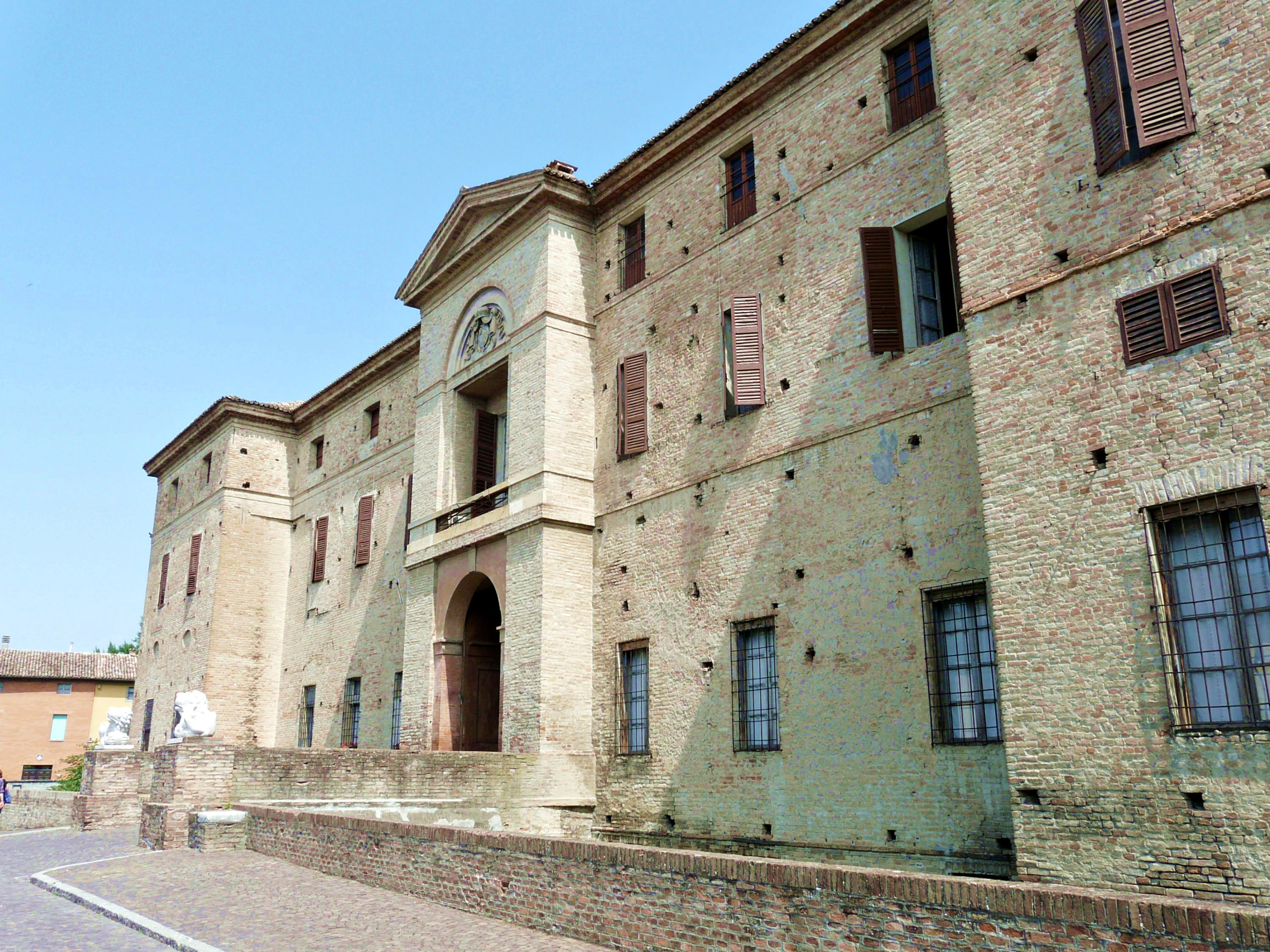
Façade with lions and side towers

The Rocca Meli Lupi, also known as Rocca di Soragna, is a castle-palace in Soragna, Province of Parma, in the Emilia-Romagna region of northern Italy. The building has a rough, unfinished exterior but richly decorated interior rooms.

== History ==
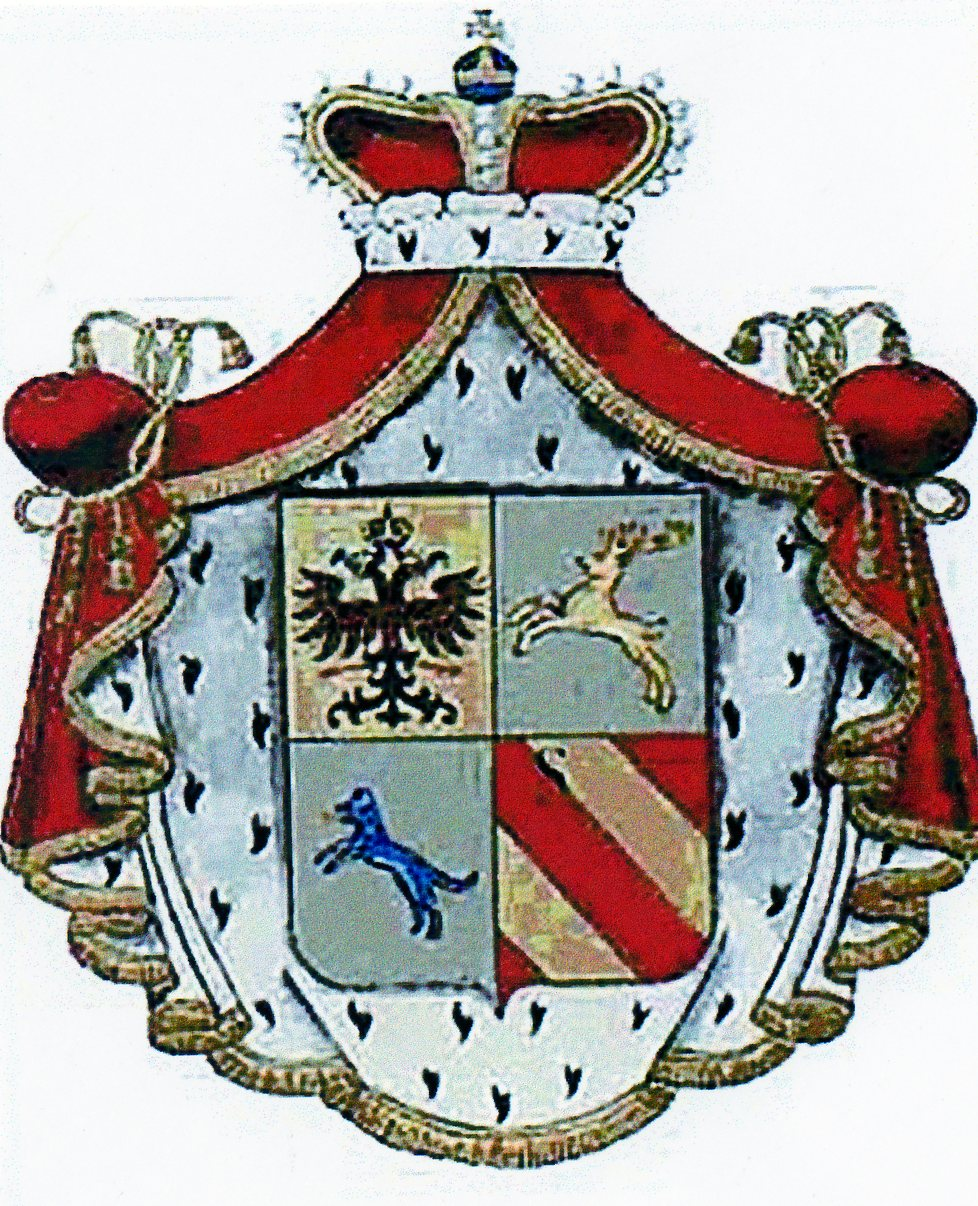
Coat of arms of the Princes Meli-Lupi di Soragna, members of an ancient Italian nobility claiming descent from the Obertenghi family, along with other prominent Italian noble Houses such as Este, Fieschi and Malaspina

The first fortress on the site was built in 985 by Marquis Adalbert I of Milan, who had received Soragna and Busseto from Emperor Otto I. In the 12th century, the area was acquired by the Pallavicino family. In 1186, the castle was stormed by combined Guelph forces from Piacenza and Cremona, but the lordship was confirmed to the Pallavicino by Emperor Frederick Barbarossa in 1189. A few years later, the Lupi family acquired the castle through marriage and initiated a reconstruction program.

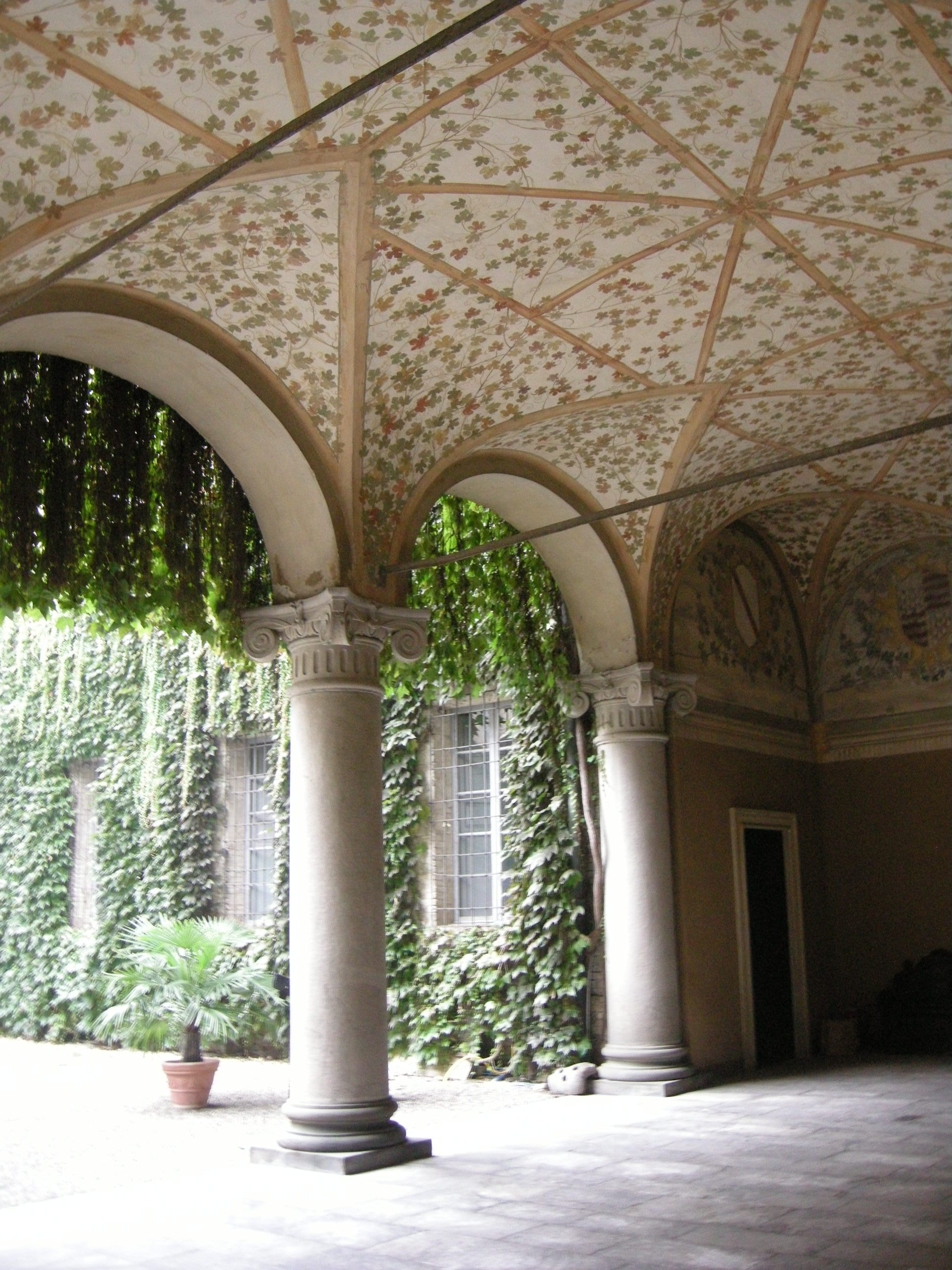
Palace courtyard frescoes

Built in 1361, the castle once belonged to the princes of the Meli Lupi family of Soragna. The castle had corner towers. In 1446, ornamental grapevine frescoes were painted in the ceilings of the courtyard portico. In 1513 the Meli inherited all the Lupi fiefs, including the castle. Further reconstructions and expansions occurred through the centuries. The castle is still inhabited by descendants of the Meli Lupi family.

Donna Cenerina is the nickname attached to Cassandra Marinoni of Milan, wife of marquis Diofebo II Meli Lupi, who was assassinated in this castle by her brother-in-law Giulio Anguissola in 1573. Legend claims her ghost still haunts the castle.

== Description ==
The castle has a symmetrical, roughly squared plan. At the four corners are quadrangular towers. Another, narrower tower (added in the 17th century) is located at the entrance. A moat, now waterless, protects the three frontal sides. A structure in the rear area connects a tower to the S. Croce Chapel, in turn connected at a smaller fortress, the Fortino Neogotico. The latter is accompanied by a small lake surrounded by grottoes and Baroque statues.

The main façade, in brickwork, is accessed through a small bridge build in the 17th century replace the former drawbridge. Two lions are placed at the side of the bridge's side walls. The central tower has a large window and balcony, above which is a small arch featuring the Meli Lupi coat of arms.

In the interior, some rooms are open to the public:

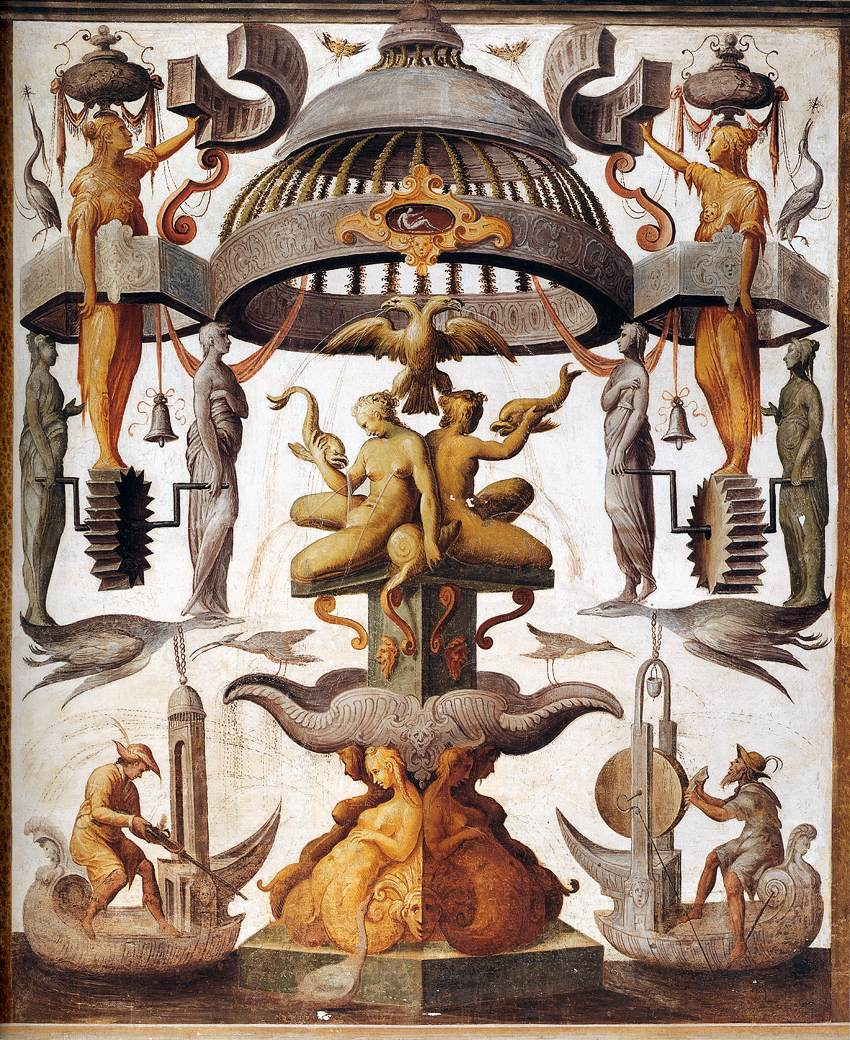
Baglione's Grotteschi

- Red Room, with 6 paintings by il Brescianino and portraits of the present owners Giampaolo Meli Lupi and his wife Ottavia Rossi
- Antique Billiard Room, whose walls are decorated with family portraits, among them, the portrait of Donna Cinerina
- Dragon stairs that go up to the second floor
- Room of the Strong Women
- Sala Baglione, with the Grotesque style frescoes integrating heraldic images (17th-century) done by Cesare Baglione
- Golden Water Closet with the wooden ceiling (1701) by Giuseppe Bosi
- Plaster Room, with the frescoed ceiling depicting the Apotheosis of the Meli-Lupi Family by Francesco and Ferdinando Galli-Bibiena
- Gallery with the frescoes depicting the noble birth of the family (1696) by Francesco Galli-Bibiena, and a fresco of an Assumption by Ilario Spolverini
- Gallery of the nuns with 17th-century portraits of the Farnese family.

At the centre of the castle is a porticoed courtyard with Ionic columns. The vaults of the portico have Groteque-style frescoes. Four statues at each corner complete the decoration.

The gardens of the site include a lake surrounded by grottoes and baroque statuary. The church of San Giacomo is nearby.

== See also ==
- Castles of the Duchy
