= Claudia Bühlmann =

Swiss bobsledder

Medal record

Women's Bobsleigh

Representing Switzerland

World Cup Championships
Gold medal – first place	1994-95	Two-woman

Claudia Bühlmann is a Swiss bobsledder who competed in the mid-1990s. She was the first ever Bobsleigh World Cup champion in the two-woman event in 1994–95.
