= Dietmar Falkenberg =

East German bobsledder

Medal record

Men's Bobsleigh

Representing East Germany

World Cup Championships
Bronze medal – third place	1989-90	Four-man

Dietmar Falkenberg is an East German former bobsledder who competed in the late 1980s and early 1990s. He is best known for his third place in the Bobsleigh World Cup championship in the four-man event in 1989-90.
