= Christian Schebitz =

German bobsledder

Medal record

Men's Bobsleigh

Representing West Germany

World Cup Championships
Gold medal – first place	1989-90	Two-man

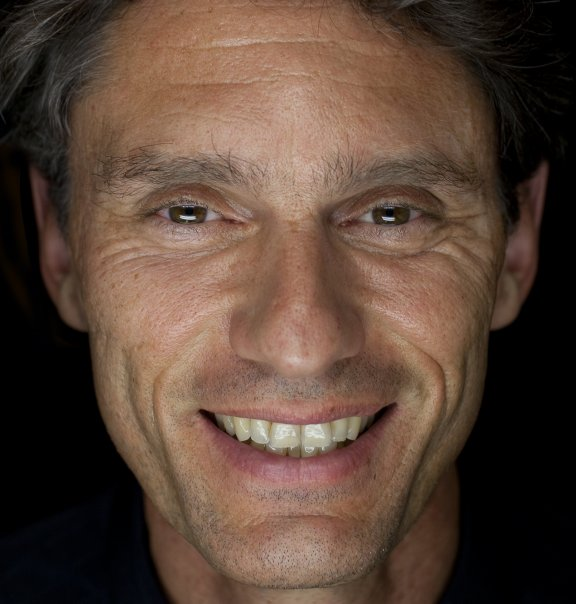

Christian Schebitz (born 9 November 1962) is a West German bobsledder who competed in the late 1980s and early 1990s. He is also known for Bobsleigh World Cup two-man championship victory in 1989-90.
