= Howard Smith (bobsleigh) =

British bobsledder (born 1956)

Personal information
- Nationality: British
- Born: 29 September 1956 (age 69)

Sport
- Sport: Bobsleigh

Howard Smith (born 29 September 1956) is a British bobsledder . He competed in the four man event at the 1984 Winter Olympics.
