= Paolo Scaramuzza =

Italian bobsledder (born 1959)

Personal information
- Nationality: Italian
- Born: 27 February 1959 (age 66); Soragna, Italy

Sport
- Sport: Bobsleigh

Paolo Scaramuzza (born 27 February 1959) is an Italian bobsledder. He competed at the 1984 Winter Olympics and the 1988 Winter Olympics.
