= Nenad Prodanović =

Bosnian bobsledder

Personal information
- Nationality: Bosnian
- Born: 28 November 1954 (age 70); Sarajevo, Yugoslavia

Sport
- Sport: Bobsleigh

Nenad Prodanović (born 28 November 1954) is a Bosnian bobsledder. He competed in the four man event at the 1984 Winter Olympics, representing Yugoslavia.
