= Ferdinand Grössing =

Austrian bobsledder

Personal information
- Nationality: Austrian
- Born: 6 November 1952 (age 72)

Sport
- Sport: Bobsleigh

Ferdinand Grössing (born 6 November 1952) is an Austrian bobsledder. He competed in the four man event at the 1984 Winter Olympics.
