= Wayne DeAtley =

American bobsledder

Personal information
- Born: November 21, 1958 (age 67) Takoma Park, Maryland, United States

Sport
- Sport: Bobsleigh

Wayne DeAtley (born November 21, 1958) is an American bobsledder. He competed in the two man event at the 1984 Winter Olympics.
