= John Drost =

Dutch bobsledder (born 1958)

Personal information
- Nationality: Dutch
- Born: 27 February 1958 (age 67); Utrecht, Netherlands

Sport
- Sport: Bobsleigh

John Drost (born 27 February 1958) is a Dutch bobsledder. He competed in the two man event at the 1984 Winter Olympics.
