= Ed Card =

American bobsledder

Personal information
- Born: December 16, 1946 (age 79) Hudson, New York, United States

Sport
- Sport: Bobsleigh

Ed Card (born December 16, 1946) is an American bobsledder. He competed in the four man event at the 1984 Winter Olympics.
