= Philippe Aurox =

French bobsledder

Personal information
- Nationality: French
- Born: 29 July 1957 (age 67)

Sport
- Sport: Bobsleigh

Philippe Aurox (born 29 July 1957) is a French bobsledder. He competed in the four-man event at the 1984 Winter Olympics.
