= Andrej Lanišek =

Slovenian biathlete (born 1957)

Personal information
- Nationality: Slovenian
- Born: 13 October 1957 (age 67); Ljubljana, Yugoslavia

Sport
- Sport: Biathlon

Andrej Lanišek (born 13 October 1957) is a Slovenian biathlete. He competed in the 20 km individual event at the 1984 Winter Olympics.
