= Māris Poikāns =

Latvian bobsledder (born 1962)

Medal record

Men's Bobsleigh

Representing the Soviet Union

World Cup
Gold medal – first place	1985–86	Two-man
Gold medal – first place	1989–90	Combined
Silver medal – second place	1989–90	Four-man
Bronze medal – third place	1989–90	Two-man

European Championships
Bronze medal – third place	1990 Igls	Two-man

Māris Poikāns (born 11 December 1962, Vidriži) is a Latvian bobsledder who competed from the mid-1980s to the early 1990s for Soviet Union. He won the combined men's Bobsleigh World Cup championship in 1989–90. He also won a bronze medal alongside brakeman Andrei Gorochov in the two-man race at the European Championship in 1990.

Competing in two Winter Olympics, Poikans earned his best finish of fifth in the four-man event at Calgary in 1988.
