= Andreas Weikenstorfer =

German bobsledder

Personal information
- Nationality: German
- Born: 20 January 1958 (age 67); Pähl, West Germany

Sport
- Sport: Bobsleigh

Andreas Weikenstorfer (born 20 January 1958) is a German bobsledder. He competed in the two man event at the 1984 Winter Olympics.
