= David Leuty =

Canadian bobsledder

Personal information
- Born: 25 February 1960 (age 65); Toronto, Ontario, Canada

Sport
- Sport: Bobsleigh

David Leuty (born 25 February 1960) is a Canadian bobsledder. He competed at the 1984 Winter Olympics and the 1988 Winter Olympics.
