= Jeffrey Jost =

American bobsledder

Jeffrey Jost (sometimes listed as Jeff Jost) is an American bobsledder who competed from the late 1970s to the mid-1980s. He won the Bobsleigh World Cup four-man event in 1984–85, although at the time, that classification was unofficial.

Competing in two Winter Olympics, Jost earned his best finish of fifth in the four-man event at Sarajevo in 1984.
