= Philippe Stott =

French bobsledder

Personal information
- Nationality: French
- Born: 3 November 1957 (age 67); Paris, France

Sport
- Sport: Bobsleigh

Philippe Stott (born 3 November 1957) is a French bobsledder. He competed in the four man event at the 1984 Winter Olympics.
