= Francis Mougel =

French biathlete (born 1960)

Personal information
- Nationality: French
- Born: 7 May 1960 (age 64); Cornimont, France

Sport
- Sport: Biathlon

Francis Mougel (born 7 May 1960) is a French biathlete. He competed at the 1984 Winter Olympics and the 1988 Winter Olympics.
