= Joe Briski =

American bobsledder

Personal information
- Born: October 2, 1955 (age 70) Detroit, Michigan, United States

Sport
- Sport: Bobsleigh

Joe Briski (born October 2, 1955) is an American bobsledder and Hammer Thrower. He competed in the four man event at the 1984 Winter Olympics and later that year competed in the Hammer Throw at the 1984 Team USA Olympic Trials in Los Angeles
