= Matt Roy (bobsleigh) =

American bobsledder

Matt Roy is an American bobsledder, born in New York City, who competed in the mid to late 1980s. He won the Bobsleigh World Cup combined men's event in 1986-7 and unofficial four-man event that same year.

Roy finished 16th in both the two-man and four-man event at the 1988 Winter Olympics in Calgary. He later became Executive Director for the United States Bobsled and Skeleton Federation in the early 1990s.
