= Wolfgang Scharf =

German speed skater

Personal information
- Nationality: German
- Born: 13 November 1959 (age 65); Munich, West Germany

Sport
- Sport: Speed skating

Wolfgang Scharf (born 13 November 1959) is a German speed skater. He competed in three events at the 1984 Winter Olympics.
