= Hal Hoye =

American bobsledder

Personal information
- Born: September 18, 1957 (age 68) Jacksonville, Florida, United States

Sport
- Sport: Bobsleigh

Hal Hoye (born September 18, 1957) is an American bobsledder. He competed at the 1984 Winter Olympics and the 1988 Winter Olympics.
