= Hans-Peter Oberhuber =

German speed skater

Personal information
- Nationality: German
- Born: 29 December 1962 (age 62); Traunstein, West Germany

Sport
- Sport: Speed skating

Hans-Peter Oberhuber (born 29 December 1962) is a German speed skater. He competed at the 1984 Winter Olympics and the 1988 Winter Olympics.
