= Hans Metzler =

German bobsledder

Personal information
- Nationality: German
- Born: 22 February 1960 (age 65); Mainz, West Germany

Sport
- Sport: Bobsleigh

Hans Metzler (born 22 February 1960) is a German bobsledder. He competed in the two man and the four man events at the 1984 Winter Olympics.
