= Hans-Jürgen Hartmann =

German bobsledder

Personal information
- Nationality: German
- Born: 12 April 1955 (age 69); Ludwigshafen, West Germany

Sport
- Sport: Bobsleigh

Hans-Jürgen Hartmann (born 12 April 1955) is a German bobsledder. He competed in the two man event at the 1984 Winter Olympics.
