= Dominique Locatelli =

French cross-country skier (born 1961)

Personal information
- Nationality: French
- Born: 3 January 1961 (age 64); La Tronche, France

Sport
- Sport: Cross-country skiing

Dominique Locatelli (born 3 January 1961) is a French cross-country skier. He competed at the 1980 Winter Olympics, the 1984 Winter Olympics and the 1988 Winter Olympics.
