= Nick Phipps (bobsleigh) =

British bobsledder (1952–2024)

Personal information
- Nationality: British (English)
- Born: 8 April 1952 New Haw, Surrey, England
- Died: 24 April 2024 (aged 72)
- Height: 185 cm (6 ft 1 in)
- Weight: 95 kg (209 lb)

Sport
- Sport: Athletics
- Event: bobsleigh / decathlon

Nicholas David Phipps (8 April 1952 – 24 April 2024) was a British bobsledder and athlete who competed from 1980 to 1992. He competed at two Winter Olympics.

== Biography ==
Phipps was born in New Haw, Surrey, England and started his sporting career as an athlete participating in the decathlon. He finished third behind Barry King in the decathlon event at the 1972 AAA Championships, improving to second place behind David Kidner one year later at the 1973 AAA Championships.

Phipps remained one of Britain's leading decathletes and helped them win a four nations tournament in Copenhagen during June 1976. A team that included Mike Corden and a 17 year old Daley Thompson. He also finished runner-up behind Pan Zeniou at the 1977 AAA Championships.

Nick was also a keen motorcyclist and had his Honda looked after by a company in London who always valued his custom and regarded him as one of the nicest and most down-to-Earth people you could wish to meet. This was during his time as a Bobsleigh Member for Team GB in the Winter Olympics in 1980. Phipps left athletics to take up the bobsleigh and competed at the 1980 Winter Olympics. He finished third in the Bobsleigh World Cup combined men's event in 1985-86. Competing in a second Winter Olympics, Phipps earned his best finish of 13th both in the two-man and four-man events at Albertville in 1992.

Phipps later became a coach of the pole vault and was a member of the pole vault steering group for England Athletics.

Phipps died on 24 April 2024, at the age of 72.
