= Andreas Lemcke =

German speed skater

Personal information
- Nationality: German
- Born: 9 August 1959 (age 65); Berlin, Germany

Sport
- Sport: Speed skating

Andreas Lemcke (born 9 August 1959) is a German speed skater. He competed in three events at the 1984 Winter Olympics.
