= Patrick Lachaud =

French bobsledder

Personal information
- Nationality: French
- Born: 8 March 1954 (age 71); Périgueux, France

Sport
- Sport: Bobsleigh

Patrick Lachaud (born 8 March 1954) is a French bobsledder. He competed in the two man and the four man events at the 1984 Winter Olympics.
