= Soragna =

- Comune
- Comune di Soragna
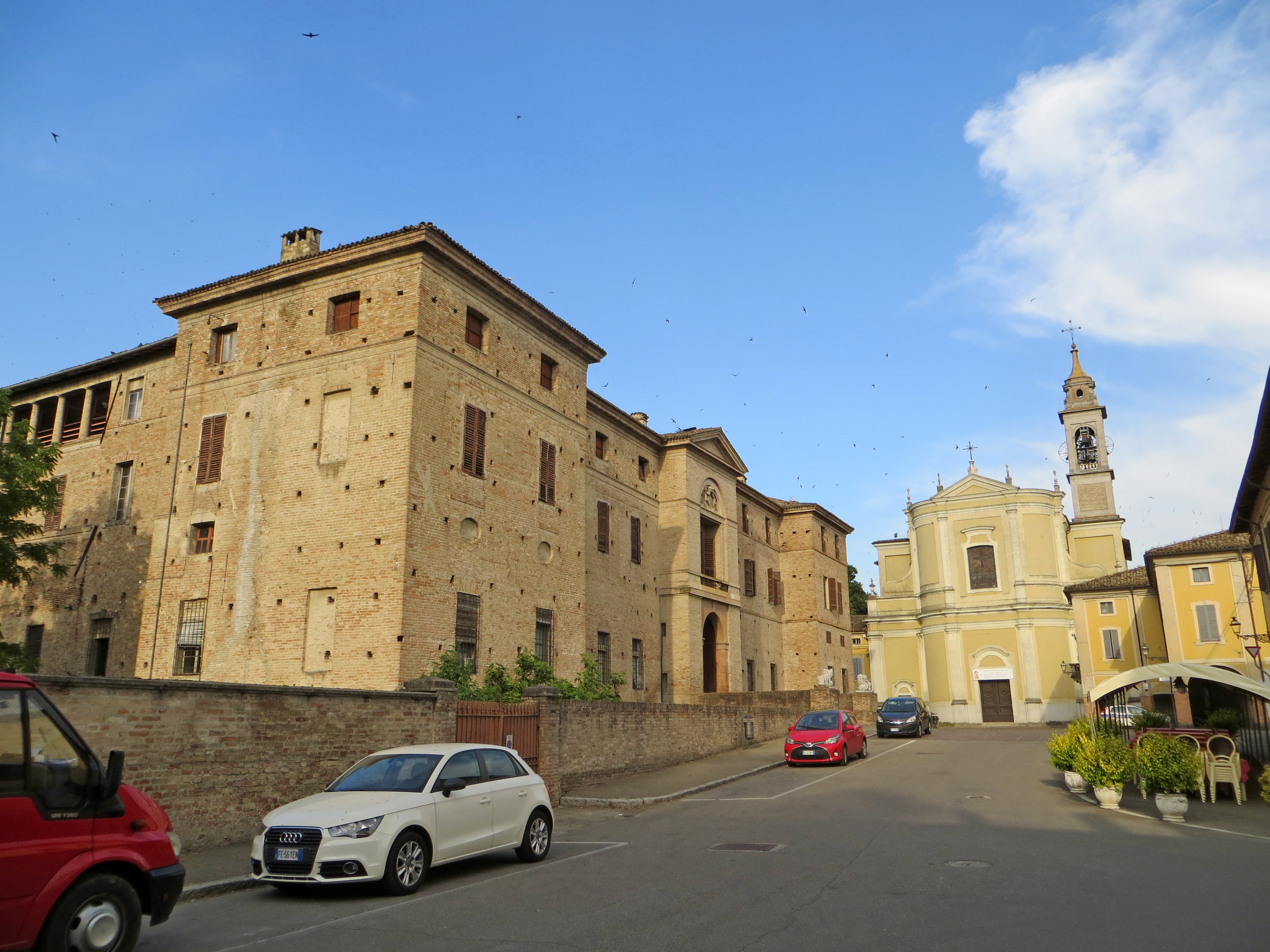

- Coat of arms

- Location within Italy Location within Emilia-Romagna
- Coordinates: 44°56′N 10°7′E
- Country: Italy
- Region: Emilia-Romagna
- Province: Parma (PR)
- Frazioni: Carzeto, Castellina, Diolo

Government
  - Mayor: Marco Taccagni

Area
  - Total: 45 km^{2} (17 sq mi)
- Elevation: 49 m (161 ft)

Population (31 December 2016)
  - Total: 4,834
  - Density: 110/km^{2} (280/sq mi)
- Time zone: UTC+1 (CET)
  - Summer (DST): UTC+2 (CEST)
- Postal code: 43019
- Dialing code: 0524

Soragna (Parmigiano: Suràgna) is a town and comune in the Province of Parma, northern Italy, with a population of about 4,800.

Soragna is first recorded in 712, in a document issued by the Lombard king Liutprand. From 1198, it was a possession of the Lupi family and an imperial fief elevated to a marquisate in 1347 and to a principate in 1709 with the right to mint coins.

The town is home to the medieval rocca (fortress), later converted into a palace, known as the Rocca Meli Lupi. The first fortress on the site was built in 985 by Marquis Adalbert I of Milan, who had received Soragna and Busseto from Emperor Otto I. In the 12th century, the area was acquired by the Pallavicino family. In 1186, the castle was stormed by combined Guelph forces from Piacenza and Cremona, but the lordship was confirmed to the Pallavicino by Emperor Frederick Barbarossa in 1189. A few years later, the Lupi family acquired the castle through marriage and initiated a reconstruction program. The building contains 16th-century frescoes by Cesare Baglione, possibly Niccolò dell'Abbate, and other artists. The surrounding park was redesigned as an English garden around 1820.

Notable churches include:

- Beata Vergine del Carmine e San Rocco
- San Giacomo
- Oratory of Sant'Antonio da Padova
- Santa Caterina D'Alessandria
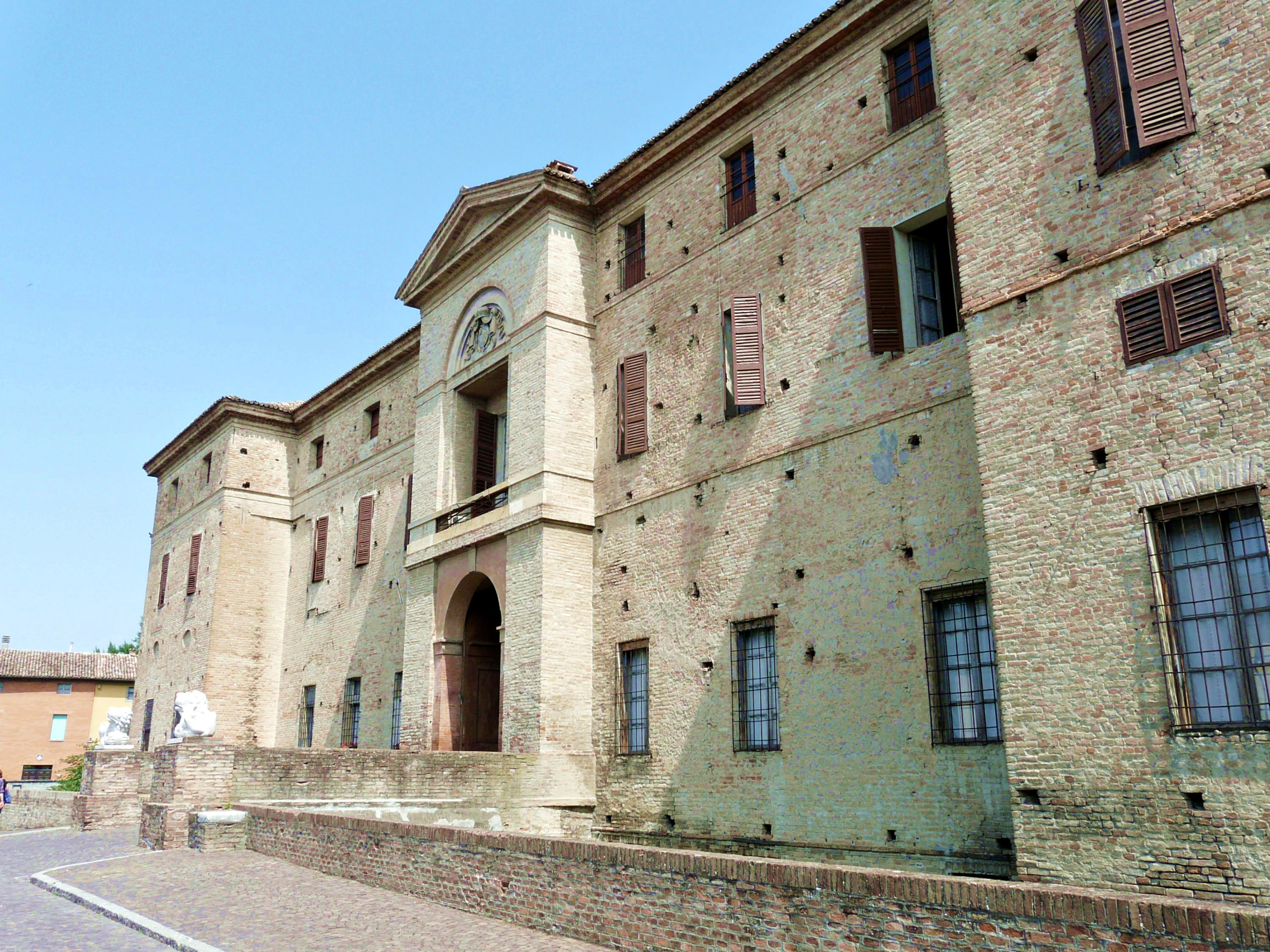
Rocca Meli Lupi.

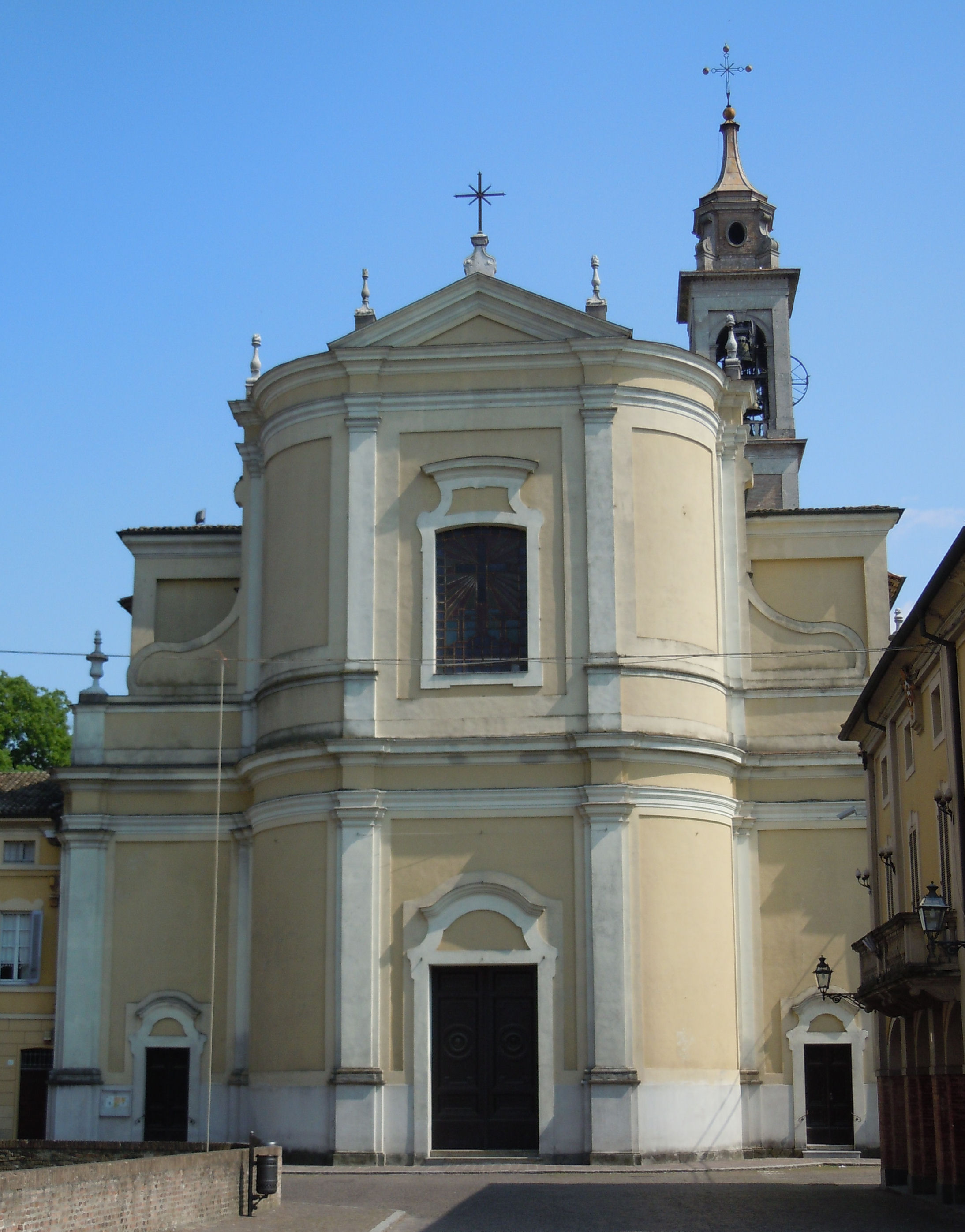
San Giacomo (Saint James) church.

== Twin towns ==
- Banská Štiavnica, Slovakia

== Sources ==
- Mordacci, Alessandra, ed. (2009). La Rocca di Soragna. Parma: Gazzetta di Parma Editore.
