= Nikola Korica =

Bosnian bobsledder

Personal information
- Nationality: Bosnian
- Born: 8 November 1960 (age 64); Gospić, Yugoslavia

Sport
- Sport: Bobsleigh

Nikola Korica (born 8 November 1960) is a Yugoslavian bobsledder. He competed in the two man and the four man events at the 1984 Winter Olympics, representing Yugoslavia.
