= Uwe Streb =

German speed skater

Personal information
- Nationality: German
- Born: 17 April 1963 (age 61); Pappenheim, West Germany

Sport
- Sport: Speed skating

Uwe Streb (born 17 April 1963) is a German speed skater. He competed at the 1984 Winter Olympics and the 1988 Winter Olympics.
