= Jean-Noël Fagot =

French speed skater (born 1958)

Jean-Noël Fagot (born 9 December 1958) is a former ice speed skater from France, who represented his native country at the 1984 Winter Olympics in Sarajevo, Yugoslavia.
