= Zdravko Stojnić =

Bosnian bobsledder

Personal information
- Nationality: Bosnian
- Born: 13 April 1957 (age 68); Sarajevo, Yugoslavia

Sport
- Sport: Bobsleigh

Zdravko Stojnić (born 13 April 1957) is a Bosnian bobsledder. He competed at the 1984 Winter Olympics and 1992 Winter Olympics, representing Yugoslavia, and at the 1994 Winter Olympics, representing Bosnia and Herzegovina.
