= Franz Nießner =

German bobsledder

Personal information
- Nationality: German
- Born: 16 March 1957 (age 69) Oberammergau, West Germany

Sport
- Sport: Bobsleigh

Franz Nießner (born 16 March 1957) is a German bobsledder. He competed at the 1984 Winter Olympics and the 1988 Winter Olympics.

== Career ==
Franz Nießner competed as a brakeman for Anton Fischer at the 1984 Winter Olympics. Together with Uwe Eisenreich and Hans Metzler, they finished 14th in the four-man bobsleigh competition. In 1985, Nießner became German champion in both the two-man and four-man bobsleigh events with Anton Fischer. He then participated in the 1987 World Championships, where Fischer's bobsleigh, with Franz Nießner, Christoph Langen, and Uwe Eisenreich, finished fourth. At the 1988 Winter Olympics in Calgary, they finished eleventh. Nießner ended his career the following year.
