= Uwe Eisenreich =

German bobsledder (born 1958)

Personal information
- Nationality: German
- Born: 12 July 1958 (age 66); Friedberg, West Germany

Sport
- Sport: Bobsleigh

Uwe Eisenreich (born 12 July 1958) is a German bobsledder. He competed at the 1984 Winter Olympics and the 1988 Winter Olympics.
