= Anton Fischer (bobsleigh) =

German bobsledder

Medal record

Men's Bobsleigh

Representing West Germany

World Cup Championships
Gold medal – first place	1984–85	Combined
Gold medal – first place	1984–85	Two-man
Gold medal – first place	1986–87	Two-man
Bronze medal – third place	1986–87	Combined

Anton Fischer is a West German bobsledder who competed in the 1980s. He was the first ever winner of the Bobsleigh World Cup in 1984–85 and was unofficial winner of the two-man bobsleigh event both in that same year and in 1986–87.

Fischer also competed in two Winter Olympics, earning his best finish of seventh in the two-man event at Calgary in 1988.
