= 2017–18 IBSF Bobsleigh North American Cup =

Winners
- Two-man: (United States) Geoffrey Gadbois
- Four-man: (Brazil) Edson Bindilatti
- Two-woman: (South Korea) Kim Yoo-ran

Competitions
- Venues: 4 (8 events)

The 2017–18 IBSF Bobsleigh North American Cup was a multi-race series over a season for bobsleigh. The season started on 5 November 2017 in Whistler, Canada and ended on 14 January 2018 in Lake Placid, USA. The North American Cup is organised by the IBSF (formerly the FIBT) as a second tier of bobsleigh competitions ranking below the World Cup.

== Calendar ==
Note: Double races were held at each round for all disciplines.

Venue	Date	Details
(Canada) Whistler	5–7 November	First races were shortened to one run
(Canada) Calgary	14–17 November	
(United States) Park City	28 November–1 December	
(United States) Lake Placid	11–14 January	

== Results ==
=== Two-man ===
Event:	Gold:	Time	Silver:	Time	Bronze:	Time
(Canada) Whistler 1	Suk Young-jin; Ji Hoon; South Korea	52.11	Jeff McKeen; Keefer Joyce; Canada	52.19	Hunter Church; Hakeem Abdul-Saboor; United States	52.34
(Canada) Whistler 2	Taylor Austin; Ryan Sommer; Canada	1:44.04 (52.14 / 51.90)	Suk Young-jin; Lee Gyeong-min; South Korea	1:44.31 (51.99 / 52.32)	Hunter Church; Hakeem Abdul-Saboor; United States	1:44.83 (52.42 / 52.41)
(Canada) Calgary 1	Geoffrey Gadbois; Nicholas Taylor; United States	1:51.97 (55.80 / 56.17)	Rudy Rinaldi; Boris Vain; Monaco	1:52.11 (55.92 / 56.19)	Suk Young-jin; Lee Gyeong-min; South Korea	1:52.25 (55.99 / 52.26)
(Canada) Calgary 2	Geoffrey Gadbois; Brent Fogt; United States	1:52.12 (56.07 / 56.05)	Rudy Rinaldi; Boris Vain; Monaco	1:52.22 (56.12 / 56.10)	Hunter Church; Hakeem Abdul-Saboor; United States	1:52.35 (56.11 / 56.24)
(United States) Park City 1	Nick Cunningham; Christopher Kinney; United States	1:37.37 (48.43 / 48.94)	Justin Olsen; Chris Fogt; United States	1:37.72 (48.75 / 48.97)	Geoffrey Gadbois; Nicholas Taylor; United States	1:37.96 (48.77 / 49.19)
(United States) Park City 2	Justin Olsen; Steve Langton; United States	1:37.88 (48.76 / 49.12)	Nick Cunningham; Nate Weber; United States	1:38.13 (48.94 / 49.19)	Rudy Rinaldi; Boris Vain; Monaco	1:38.17 (49.00 / 49.17)
(United States) Lake Placid 1	Geoffrey Gadbois; Brent Fogt; United States	1:54.07 (56.83 / 57.24)	Li Chunjian; Wang Sidong; China	1:54.38 (56.92 / 57.46)	Hunter Church; Joshua Williamson; United States	1:54.66 (57.14 / 57.52)
(United States) Lake Placid 2	Geoffrey Gadbois; Frank Delduca; United States	1:58.25 (58.95 / 59.3)	Hunter Church; Lou Moreira; United States	1:58.40 (59.22 / 59.18)	Edson Bindilatti; Edson Ricardo Martins; Brazil	1:58.74 (58.93 / 59.81)

=== Four-man ===
Event:	Gold:	Time	Silver:	Time	Bronze:	Time
(Canada) Whistler 1	Hunter Church; Joshua Williamson; Hakeem Abdul-Saboor; Lou Moreira; United States	51.50	Pius Meyerhans; Benjamin Schmid; Cyril Bieri; Justin Danso; Switzerland	51.80	Taylor Austin; Cody Bolotniuk; Ryan Sommer; Keefer Joyce; Canada	52.13
(Canada) Whistler 2	Edson Bindilatti; Odirlei Pessoni; Edson Ricardo Martins; Rafael Souza da Silva; Brazil	1:43.38 (51.73 / 51.65)	Hunter Church; Joshua Williamson; Hakeem Abdul-Saboor; Lou Moreira; United States	1:43.39 (51.58 / 51.81)	Pius Meyerhans; Marco Lorenzoni; Cyril Bieri; Justin Danso; Switzerland	1:43.51 (51.84 / 51.67)
(Canada) Calgary 1	Geoffrey Gadbois; Nicholas Taylor; Brent Fogt; Frank Delduca; United States	1:50.24 (55.05 / 55.19)	Hunter Church; Lou Moreira; Hakeem Abdul-Saboor; Joshua Williamson; United States	1:50.4 (55.27 / 55.13)	Suk Young-jin; Lee Gyeong-min; Ji Hoon; Jang Ki-kun; South Korea	1:50.55 (55.24 / 55.31)
(Canada) Calgary 2	Hunter Church; Lou Moreira; Hakeem Abdul-Saboor; Joshua Williamson; United States	1:50.34 (55.32 / 55.02)	Geoffrey Gadbois; Nicholas Taylor; Brent Fogt; Frank Delduca; United States	1:50.49 (55.35 / 55.14)	Suk Young-jin; Lee Gyeong-min; Ji Hoon; Jang Ki-kun; South Korea	1:50.53 (55.31 / 55.22)
(United States) Park City 1	Justin Olsen; Evan Weinstock; Steve Langton; Chris Fogt; United States	1:36.55 (48.15 / 48.4)	Nick Cunningham; Ryan Bailey; Chris Kinney; Sam Michener; Carlo Valdes; United States	1:36.65 (48.05 / 48.6)	Edson Bindilatti; Odirlei Pessoni; Edson Ricardo Martins; Rafael Souza da Silva; Brazil	1:46.11 (48.57 / 57.54)
(United States) Park City 2	Nick Cunningham; Sam Michener; Chris Kinney; Hakeem Abdul-Saboor; United States	1:37.02 (48.43 / 48.59)	Justin Olsen; Evan Weinstock; Steve Langton; Chris Fogt; United States	1:37.29 (48.52 / 48.77)	Edson Bindilatti; Odirlei Pessoni; Edson Ricardo Martins; Rafael Souza da Silva; Brazil	1:37.79 (48.9 / 48.89)
(United States) Lake Placid 1	Nick Cunningham; Hakeem Abdul-Saboor; Chris Kinney; Sam Michener; United States	1:50.13 (55 / 55.13)	Hunter Church; Brent Fogt; Lou Moreira; Joshua Williamson; United States	1:51.14 (55.47 / 55.67)	Edson Bindilatti; Odirlei Pessoni; Erick Gilson Vianna Jeronimo; Rafael Souza da Silva; Brazil	1:51.29 (55.5 / 55.79)
(United States) Lake Placid 2	Hunter Church; Brent Fogt; Lou Moreira; Sam Michener; United States	1:49.58 (54.66 / 54.92)	Nick Cunningham; Hakeem Abdul-Saboor; Chris Kinney; Nicholas Taylor; United States	1:50.61 (56.08 / 54.53)	Jin Jian; Mu Yancun; Wang Sidong; Sun Kaizhi; China	1:50.73 (55.42 / 55.31)

=== Two-woman ===
Event:	Gold:	Time	Silver:	Time	Bronze:	Time
(Canada) Whistler 1	Kim Yoo-ran; Kim Min-seong; South Korea	53.47	Lee Seon-hye; Shin Mi-ran; South Korea	53.48	Ying Qing; He Xinyi; China	53.53
(Canada) Whistler 2	Julie Johnson; Alecia Beckford-Stewart; Canada	1:46.83 (53.17 / 53.66)	Jazmine Fenlator-Victorian; Carrie Russell; Jamaica	1:47.03 (53.43 / 53.60)	Lee Seon-hye; Shin Mi-ran; South Korea	1:47.15 (53.62 / 53.53)
(Canada) Calgary 1	Ying Qing; He Xinyi; China	1:55.63 (57.82 / 57.81)	Kristi Koplin; Lake Kwaza; United States	1:55.88 (57.85 / 58.03)	Kim Yoo-ran; Kim Min-seong; South Korea	1:56.08 (58.24 / 57.84)
(Canada) Calgary 2	Kristi Koplin; Nicole Brundgardt; United States	1:54.86 (57.46 / 57.4)	Kim Yoo-ran; Kim Min-seong; South Korea	1:55.74 (57.81 / 57.93)	Ying Qing; He Xinyi; China	1:56.14 (57.97 / 58.17)
(United States) Park City 1	Elana Meyers Taylor; Briauna Jones; United States	1:39.09 (49.29 / 49.80)	Nicole Vogt; Maureen Ajoku; United States	1:39.82 (49.70 / 50.12)	Brittany Reinbolt; Kehri Jones; United States	1:39.90 (49.70 / 50.20)
(United States) Park City 2	Nicole Vogt; Maureen Ajoku; United States	1:40.28 (50.01 / 50.27)	Jamie Greubel Poser; Lolo Jones; United States	1:40.47 (49.88 / 50.59)	Brittany Reinbolt; Briauna Jones; United States	1:40.49 (50.18 / 50.31)
(United States) Lake Placid 1	Nicole Vogt; Nicole Brundgardt; United States	1:56.22 (58.02 / 58.2)	Kristi Koplin; Kyle Plante; United States	1:56.33 (58.02 / 58.31)	Kim Yoo-ran; Kim Min-seong; South Korea	1:57.09 (58.36 / 58.73)
(United States) Lake Placid 2	Kristi Koplin; Nicole Brundgardt; United States	2:01.87 (60.54 / 61.33)	Kim Yoo-ran; Shin Mi-ran; South Korea	2:02.34 (60.92 / 61.42)	Lee Seon-hye; Kim Min-seong; South Korea	2:02.45 (61.07 / 61.38)

== Standings ==
=== Two-man ===
(J) – Junior competitor.

Pos.	Racer	(Canada) WHI1	(Canada) WHI2	(Canada) CAL1	(Canada) CAL2	(United States) PAC1	(United States) PAC2	(United States) LPL1	(United States) LPL2	Points
1	Geoffrey Gadbois (USA) (J)	DNF	5	1	1	3	4	1	1	770
2	Taylor Austin (CAN)	4	1	5	9	8	6	7	7	720
3	Shao Yijun (CHN) (J)	13	9	4	5	9	5	6	6	668
4	Li Chunjian (CHN) (J)	9	7	10	10	10	10	2	5	650
5	Jin Jian (CHN) (J)	6	4	12	11	12	11	5	4	636
6	Hunter Church (USA) (J)	3	3	9	3	–	–	3	2	594
7	Edson Bindilatti (BRA)	7	DNS	11	13	6	9	4	3	574
8	Jeff McKeen (CAN) (J)	2	12	14	12	15	14	11	8	550
9	Dražen Silić (CRO)	8	6	15	15	13	13	10	9	540
10	Seldwyn Morgan (JAM) (J)	15	10	13	16	7	16	8	10	516
11	Cristiano Rogerio Paes (BRA)	12	DNS	7	8	5	7	9	DNF	480
12	Suk Young-jin (KOR)	1	2	3	4	DNS	DNS	–	–	428
13	Rudy Rinaldi (MON) (J)	–	–	2	2	4	3	–	–	418
14	Lucas Mata (AUS)	5	DNF	6	7	11	8	–	–	412
15	Pius Meyerhans (SUI)	11	11	8	6	–	–	–	–	304
16	Sun Kaizhi (CHN)	10	8	16	–	14	–	–	–	256
17	Justin Olsen (USA)	–	–	–	–	2	1	–	–	230
18	Nick Cunningham (USA)	–	–	–	–	1	2	–	–	230
19	Dustin Greenwood (USA)	–	–	–	–	–	–	12	11	132
20	Tyler Hickey (USA) (J)	–	–	–	–	–	–	13	12	124
21	Shen Ke (CHN) (J)	–	–	–	14	–	12	–	–	120
22	Stuart Chisholm (CAN) (J)	14	13	–	–	–	–	–	–	116
23	Park Chang Hyun (KOR) (J)	–	–	–	–	16	15	–	–	100
24	Nam Seung-hyeok (KOR) (J)	–	–	–	–	17	17	–	–	88
–	Conor Elder (CAN) (J)	–	–	DSQ	DNS	–	–	–	–	0
