= IBSF World Championships 2023 – Two-man =

Two-man at the IBSF World Championships 2023
- Venue: St. Moritz-Celerina Olympic Bobrun
- Location: St. Moritz, Switzerland
- Dates: 28–29 January
- Competitors: 60 from 18 nations
- Teams: 30
- Winning time: 4:21.84

Medalists
gold medal	Johannes Lochner; Georg Fleischhauer	Germany
silver medal	Francesco Friedrich; Alexander Schüller	Germany
bronze medal	Michael Vogt; Sandro Michel	Switzerland

The Two-man competition at the IBSF World Championships 2023 was held on 28 and 29 January 2023.

== Results ==
The first two runs were started on 28 January at 13:00 and the last two runs on 29 January at 13:15.

Rank	Bib	Country	Athletes	Run 1	Rank	Run 2	Rank	Run 3	Rank	Run 4	Rank	Total	Behind
1st place, gold medalist(s)	10	Germany	Johannes Lochner; Georg Fleischhauer	1:05.69	2	1:05.22	1	1:05.26	1	1:05.67	5	4:21.84	
2nd place, silver medalist(s)	9	Germany	Francesco Friedrich; Alexander Schüller	1:05.78	3	1:05.45	2	1:05.63	5	1:05.47	2	4:22.33	+0.49
3rd place, bronze medalist(s)	7	Switzerland	Michael Vogt; Sandro Michel	1:05.62	1	1:05.68	6	1:05.57	2	1:05.47	2	4:22.34	+0.50
4	6	Germany	Christoph Hafer; Matthias Sommer	1:05.88	5	1:05.57	3	1:05.66	6	1:05.59	4	4:22.70	+0.86
5	8	Great Britain	Brad Hall; Taylor Lawrence	1:05.82	4	1:05.57	3	1:05.62	4	1:05.76	6	4:22.77	+0.93
6	2	Latvia	Emīls Cipulis; Matīss Miknis	1:06.22	8	1:05.65	5	1:05.61	3	1:05.46	1	4:22.94	+1.10
7	22	France	Romain Heinrich; Dorian Hauterville	1:06.01	6	1:05.92	8	1:05.87	8	1:05.94	10	4:23.74	+1.90
8	1	Switzerland	Timo Rohner; Luca Rolli	1:06.28	10	1:05.87	7	1:06.18	13	1:05.80	7	4:24.13	+2.29
9	5	Austria	Markus Treichl; Markus Sammer	1:06.36	11	1:06.08	10	1:05.79	7	1:05.95	11	4:24.18	+2.34
10	12	Italy	Patrick Baumgartner; Eric Fantazzini	1:06.21	7	1:06.07	9	1:06.22	14	1:06.04	13	4:24.54	+2.70
11	15	Romania	Mihai Tentea; Ciprian Daroczi	1:06.50	12	1:06.14	11	1:06.12	11	1:05.91	9	4:24.67	+2.83
12	26	Monaco	Boris Vain; Antoine Riou	1:06.59	16	1:06.35	13	1:06.17	12	1:05.83	8	4:24.94	+3.10
13	21	Latvia	Jēkabs Kalenda; Dāvis Spriņģis	1:06.51	13	1:06.55	17	1:06.04	10	1:05.96	12	4:25.06	+3.22
14	18	China	Li Chunjian; Ding Song	1:06.51	13	1:06.37	14	1:06.26	15	1:06.36	16	4:25.50	+3.66
15	13	Czech Republic	Adam Dobeš; Jáchym Procházka	1:06.56	15	1:06.45	15	1:06.40	17	1:06.25	15	4:25.66	+3.82
16	19	Canada	Pat Norton; Cyrus Gray	1:06.86	18	1:06.84	20	1:05.97	9	1:06.12	14	4:25.79	+3.95
17	17	South Korea	Kim Jin-su; Samuel Park	1:06.65	17	1:06.49	16	1:06.30	16	1:06.36	16	4:25.80	+3.96
18	20	United States	Geoffrey Gadbois; Martin Christofferson	1:07.07	23	1:06.66	19	1:06.68	20	1:06.45	18	4:26.86	+5.02
19	16	Italy	Mattia Variola; Delmas Obou	1:07.09	24	1:06.93	21	1:06.44	18	1:06.55	20	4:27.01	+5.17
20	23	Trinidad and Tobago	Axel Brown; Shakeel John	1:07.14	25	1:07.32	26	1:06.55	19	1:06.52	19	4:27.53	+5.69
21	24	Czech Republic	Matěj Běhounek; Dominik Záleský	1:06.86	18	1:07.30	25	1:06.96	21	did not advance			
22	25	Poland	Aleksy Boroń; Seweryn Sosna	1:07.06	22	1:06.96	22	1:07.22	24	did not advance			
23	30	Austria	Jakob Mandlbauer; Daiyehan Nichols-Bardi	1:07.19	26	1:07.23	24	1:06.97	22	did not advance			
24	29	Liechtenstein	Martin Kranz; Lorenz Lenherr	1:07.20	27	1:07.18	23	1:07.13	23	did not advance			
25	27	Romania	Andrei Nica; Mihai Calancea	1:07.94	28	1:07.62	27	1:08.01	25	did not advance			
26	11	United States	Frank Del Duca; Hakeem Abdul-Saboor	1:06.94	20	1:06.65	18	1:17.86	26	did not advance			
	4	Switzerland	Simon Friedli; Andreas Haas	1:06.22	8	1:06.34	12	Did not start					
	3	Canada	Taylor Austin; Shaquille Murray-Lawrence	1:06.96	21	Did not finish							
	14	Germany	Adam Ammour; Benedikt Hertel	Did not finish									
	28	Croatia	Dražen Silić; Mario Starek	Did not finish									
