= IBSF World Championships 2019 – Two-man =

Two-man at the IBSF World Championships 2019
- Venue: Whistler Sliding Centre
- Location: Whistler, Canada
- Dates: March 1–2
- Competitors: 62 from 31 nations
- Teams: 31
- Winning time: 3:24.54

Medalists
gold medal	Francesco Friedrich; Thorsten Margis	Germany
silver medal	Justin Kripps; Cameron Stones	Canada
bronze medal	Nico Walther; Paul Krenz	Germany

The Two-man competition at the IBSF World Championships 2019 was held on March 1 and 2, 2019.

== Results ==
The first two runs were started on March 1 at 17:04 and the last two runs on March 2 at 17:04.

Rank	Bib	Country	Athletes	Run 1	Rank	Run 2	Rank	Run 3	Rank	Run 4	Rank	Total	Behind
1st place, gold medalist(s)	4	Germany	Francesco Friedrich; Thorsten Margis	51.03	2	51.28	1	51.21	1	51.02	1	3:24.54	
2nd place, silver medalist(s)	6	Canada	Justin Kripps; Cameron Stones	50.96	1	51.47	4	51.36	5	51.34	2	3:25.13	+0.59
3rd place, bronze medalist(s)	7	Germany	Nico Walther; Paul Krenz	51.16	3	51.44	2	51.34	3	51.49	8	3:25.43	+0.89
4	16	Canada	Christopher Spring; Neville Wright	51.35	7	51.51	5	51.35	4	51.47	5	3:25.68	+1.14
4	17	Great Britain	Brad Hall; Nick Gleeson	51.24	5	51.46	3	51.52	9	51.46	3	3:25.68	+1.14
6	5	Latvia	Oskars Ķibermanis; Matīss Miknis	51.22	4	51.52	6	51.58	10	51.46	3	3:25.78	+1.24
7	9	South Korea	Won Yun-jong; Seo Young-woo	51.31	6	51.55	7	51.48	7	51.47	5	3:25.81	+1.27
8	8	Germany	Johannes Lochner; Christopher Weber	51.42	8	51.65	8	51.47	6	51.51	9	3:26.05	+1.51
9	22	Monaco	Rudy Rinaldi; Boris Vain	51.46	9	51.68	9	51.33	2	51.59	10	3:26.06	+1.52
10	13	Russia	Maksim Andrianov; Ilya Malykh	51.46	9	51.68	9	51.48	7	51.47	5	3:26.09	+1.55
11	14	Austria	Markus Treichl; Markus Glück	51.57	14	51.78	12	51.75	13	51.63	11	3:26.73	+2.19
12	26	Austria	Benjamin Maier; Markus Sammer	51.65	17	51.81	13	51.67	11	51.74	13	3:26.87	+2.33
13	15	Switzerland	Michael Vogt; Sandro Michel	51.53	12	51.73	11	51.92	15	51.71	12	3:26.89	+2.35
14	11	Poland	Mateusz Luty; Krzysztof Tylkowski	51.58	16	51.89	15	51.72	12	51.79	14	3:26.98	+2.44
15	10	Czech Republic	Dominik Dvořák; Jakub Nosek	51.56	13	51.88	14	51.94	17	51.86	16	3:27.24	+2.70
16	19	United States	Codie Bascue; Joshua Williamson	51.57	14	51.89	15	51.94	17	51.99	17	3:27.39	+2.85
16	20	Netherlands	Ivo de Bruin; Dennis Veenker	51.74	19	52.00	19	51.84	14	51.81	15	3:27.39	+2.85
18	3	South Korea	Suk Young-jin; Jang Ki-kun	51.67	18	52.02	21	52.15	24	52.12	18	3:27.96	+3.42
19	2	United States	Hunter Church; Christopher Kinney	51.85	20	51.98	18	52.14	23	52.21	19	3:28.18	+3.64
20	28	China	Shao Yijun; Liu Wei	51.95	25	52.06	22	51.93	16	52.31	20	3:28.25	+3.71
21	18	Latvia	Ralfs Bērziņš; Davis Springis	51.92	23	51.95	17	52.13	22	Did not advance			
22	24	Romania	Mihai Cristian Tentea; Nicolae Ciprian Daroczi	51.99	26	52.16	24	52.02	20	Did not advance			
23	27	China	Sun Kaizhi; Ma Jianliang	52.19	28	52.34	25	52.05	21	Did not advance			
24	21	Russia	Aleksandr Bredikhin; Roman Koshelev	52.13	27	52.39	26	52.17	25	Did not advance			
25	1	Switzerland	Tino Rohner; Adrian Fässler	51.94	24	52.41	27	52.44	26	Did not advance			
26	29	Italy	Patrick Baumgartner; Alex Verginer	52.32	29	52.55	28	52.54	27	Did not advance			
27	23	United States	Geoffrey Gadbois; Adrian Adams	51.87	21	52.13	23	54.75	29	Did not advance			
28	31	Croatia	Dražen Silić; Aleksandar Krajišnik	52.78	30	52.96	29	53.27	28	Did not advance			
29	30	Israel	Dave Nicholls; Ilya Malikin	54.83	31	55.04	30	55.20	30	Did not advance			
30	12	Canada	Nick Poloniato; Benjamin Coakwell	51.46	9	1:07.55	31	51.98	19	Did not advance			
	25	Great Britain	Lamin Deen; Toby Olubi	51.89	22	52.01	20	Disqualified		Did not advance			
