= China national bobsleigh team =

China
- Association: Chinese Bobsleigh and Skeleton Association
- Team colors

Olympics
- Appearances: 2 (first in 2018)

The China national bobsleigh team (Chinese: 中国国家雪橇队; pinyin: Zhōngguó guójiā xuěqiāo duì) is the selection representing the People's Republic of China in international bobsleigh competitions.

The team has participated in two editions of the Winter Olympic Games.

== History ==
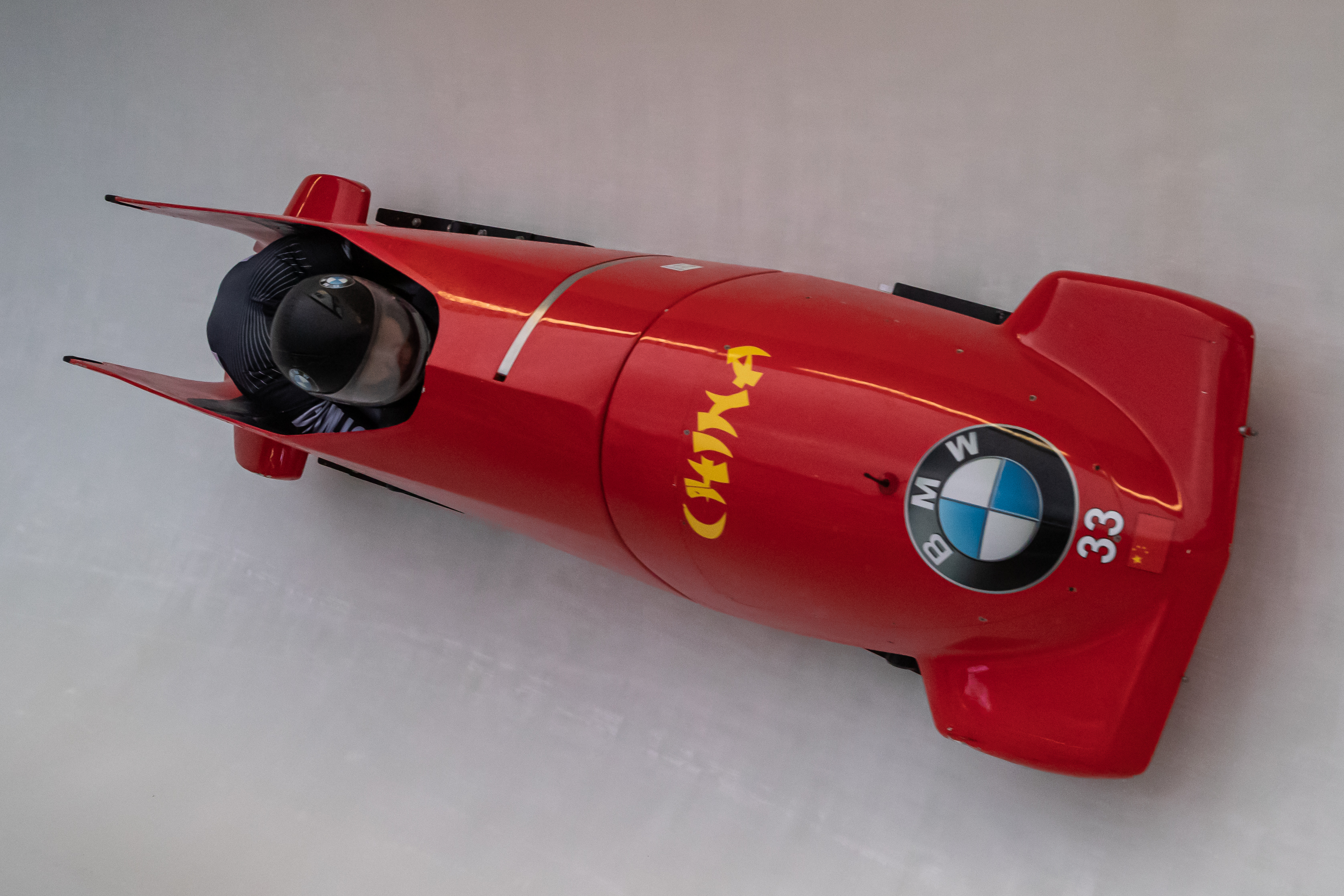
Li Chunjian and Shi Hao in the two-man bobsleigh event at Altenberg 2020.

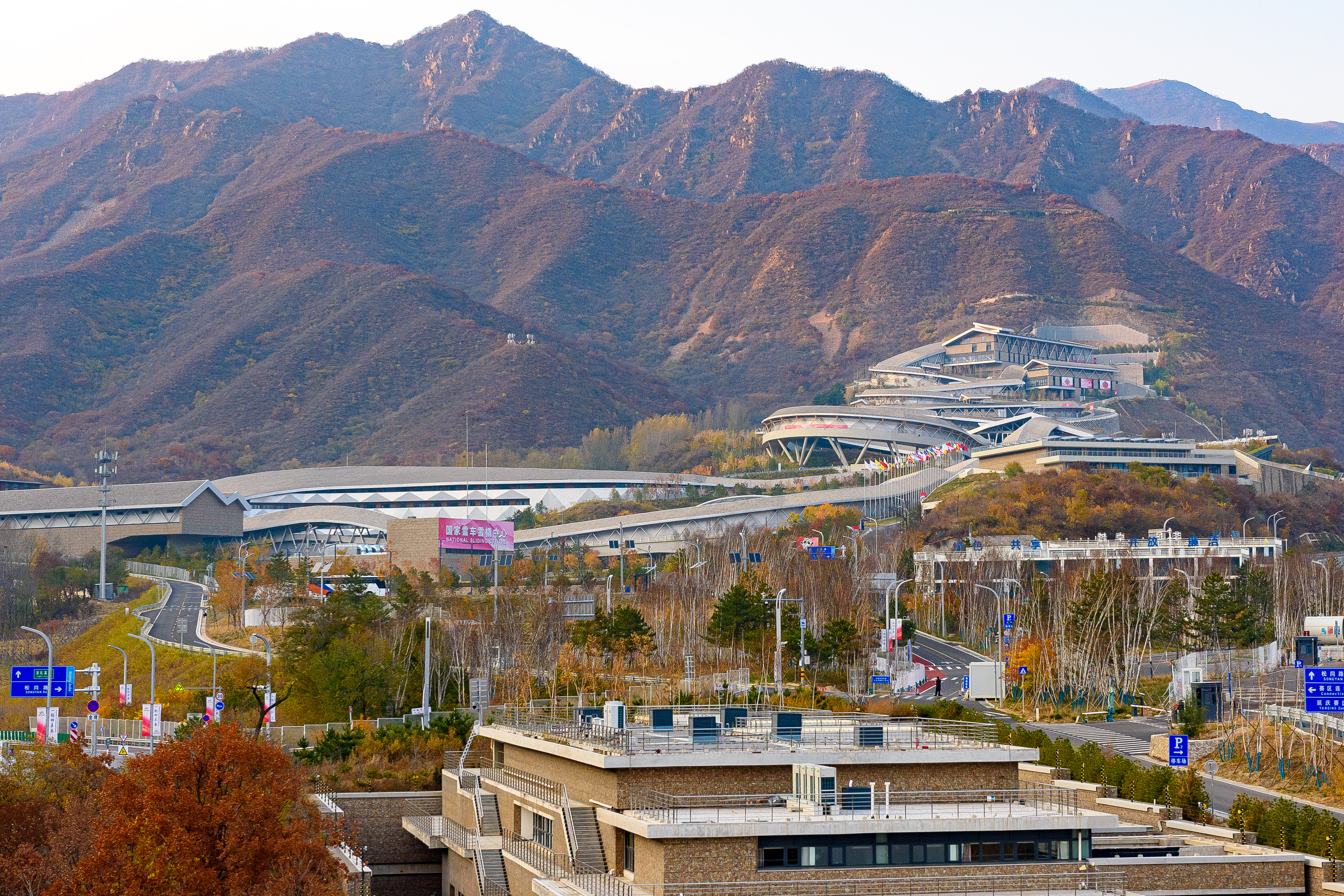
Yanqing National Sliding Centre hosted the bobsleigh, luge, and skeleton events for the 2022 Winter Olympics.

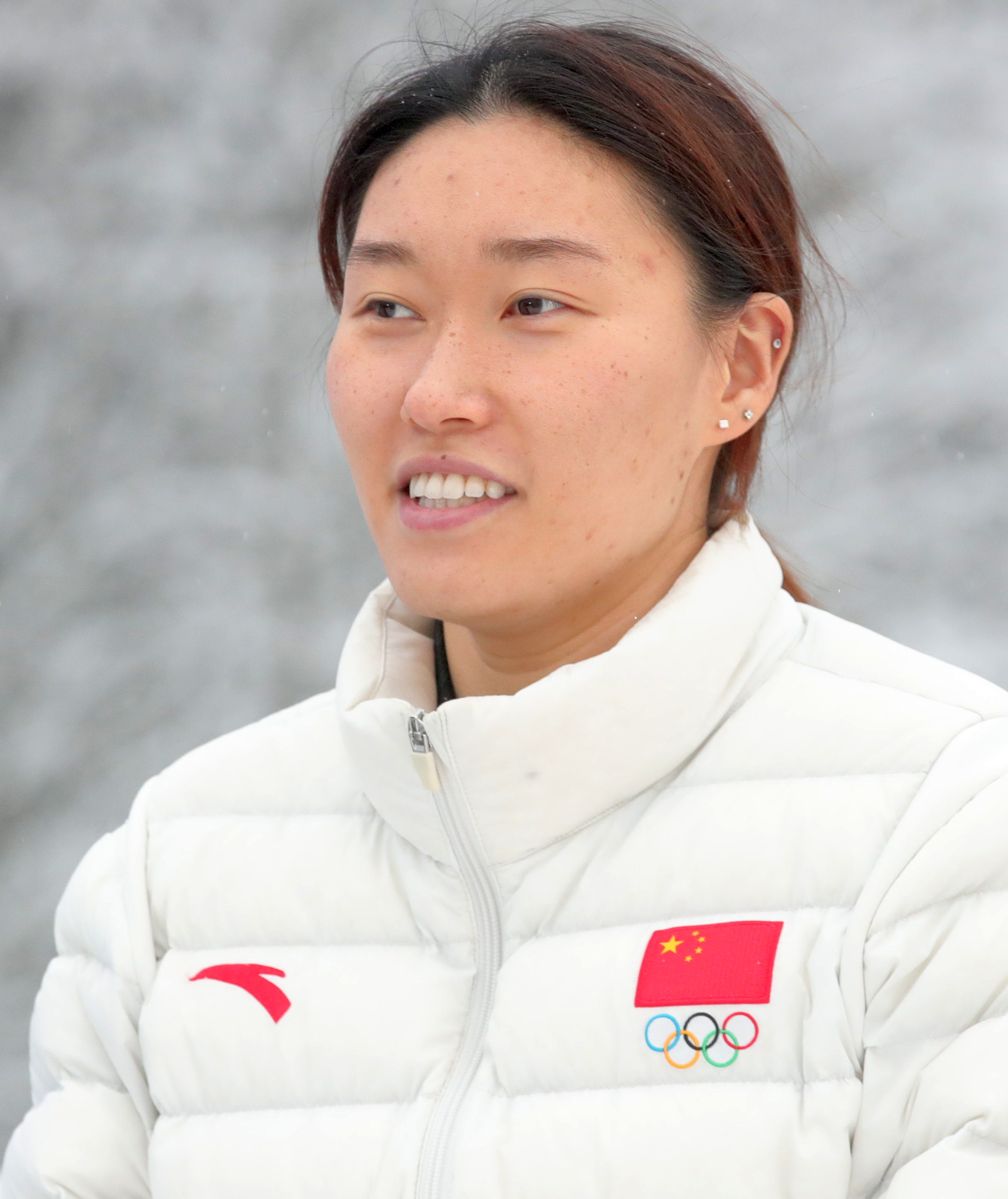
Ying Qing, first Chinese bobsledder to stand on a podium in a bobsleigh World Cup race.

Due to the lack of interest in winter sports, China's debut in the Winter Olympics took place only in Lake Placid 1980. Moreover, the sport of bobsleigh was seen as an expensive elite sport and thus not in line with the ideal of the socialist athlete, so much so that the Soviet Union national bobsleigh team only debuted at Sarajevo 1984 Winter Games; moreover, the Chinese Taipei national bobsleigh team representing Taiwan competed there for the first time. This led to the establishment of the Chinese Bobsleigh and Skeleton Association, which affiliated with the Fédération Internationale de Bobsleigh et de Tobogganing (FIBT) in 1984. For these reasons, although bobsleigh has been a sport included in Olympic events since the first edition in Chamonix-Mont-Blanc 1924, the Chinese bobsleigh team was established only after Beijing was awarded the organisation of the XXIV Olympic Winter Games of Beijing 2022. Due to its late start, China had neither tracks nor sleds of domestic production, thus having to resort to foreign-made equipment. In November 2015, the Chinese Olympic Committee appointed the German Manuel Machata as head coach of the Chinese bobsleigh team, entrusting him with the task of selecting the future Chinese bobsledders from other sports, together with Edwin van Calker. The first competitions were held in February 2016 in Calgary, Canada where the first Chinese National Bobsleigh Championships were held also in November of the following year.

In 2018, Chinese bobsledders appeared for the first time at the 2018 Winter Olympics in Pyeongchang, South Korea but recorded poor results: 26th place in the four-man event(out of 29 crews) and 26th and 29th places in the two-man event (out of 30 pairs).

Also in 2018, a first bobsled track began in China: the Yanqing National Sliding Centre also known as the 'Flying Snow Dragon' track (雪游龙S, xue yu long) in Dazhuangke village. In July 2018, team coaches were replaced, hiring Canadian Pierre Lueders (former coach of South Korea's national bobsleigh team that won Olympic silver in Pyeongchang 2018) and German André Lange.

In March 2021, the Winter Sports Centre of the General Administration of State Sports commissioned the automotive company FAW Group and the China Aerospace Science and Technology Corporation to study and build new Chinese bobsleds. After just 200 days of work, a new bobsled all "made in China" was unveiled on 31 December that year, described 'as fast as lightning, as light as a swallow, and as strong as a rock'.

At the 2022 Winter Olympics in Beijing, the best results were recorded by women: 6th and 9th place in the women's monobob event, 11th and 22nd in the women's doubles; Chinese men came 14th and 22nd in the doubles, 16th and 17th in the four-man bobsleigh event.

On 18 February 2023, during the Sigulda, Latvia event of the IBSF World Championships 2023, female bobsledder Ying Qing finished third in the monobob event, allowing her to finish within the top ten in the final Women's ranking of the 2023 Bobsleigh World Cup.

== Participation in the Winter Olympics ==
=== Four-man ===
Year	Location	Rank	Crew
2018	Pyeongchang	26	Shao Yijun, Wang Sidong, Li Chunjian, Shi Hao
2022	Beijing	16; 17	Sun Kaizhi, Wu Qingze, Wu Zhitao, Zhen Heng; Li Chunjian, Ding Song, Ye Jielong, Shi Hao

=== Two-man ===
Year	Location	Rank	Crew
2018	Pyeongchang	26; 29	Li Chunjian, Wang Sidong; Jin Jian, Shi Hao
2022	Beijing	14; 22	Sun Kaizhi, Wu Qingze; Li Chunjian, Liu Wei

=== Two-woman ===
Year	Location	Rank	Crew
2022	Beijing	11; 14	Huai Mingming, Wang Xuan; Ying Qing, Du Jiani

=== Women's monobob ===
Year	Location	Rank	Crew
2022	Beijing	6; 9	Huai Mingming; Ying Qing

== See also ==
- Bobsleigh at the Winter Olympics
- China at the Olympics
- Yanqing National Sliding Centre
