= IBSF World Championships 2025 – Two-man =

Two-man at the IBSF World Championships 2025
- Venue: Mt. Van Hoevenberg Olympic Bobsled Run
- Location: Lake Placid, United States
- Dates: 8–9 March
- Competitors: 64 from 18 nations
- Teams: 32
- Winning time: 3:39.32

Medalists
gold medal	Francesco Friedrich; Alexander Schüller	Germany
silver medal	Johannes Lochner; Georg Fleischhauer	Germany
bronze medal	Adam Ammour; Benedikt Hertel	Germany

The Two-man competition at the IBSF World Championships 2025 was held on 8 and 9 March 2025.

== Results ==
The first two runs were started on 8 March at 15:00. The final two runs were started on 9 March at 09:08.

Rank	Bib	Country	Athletes	Run 1	Rank	Run 2	Rank	Run 3	Rank	Run 4	Rank	Total	Behind
1st place, gold medalist(s)	1	Germany	Francesco Friedrich; Alexander Schüller	54.64	1	55.11	1	54.60	2	54.97	2	3:39.32	
2nd place, silver medalist(s)	2	Germany	Johannes Lochner; Georg Fleischhauer	54.74	2	55.15	2	54.52	1	54.94	1	3:39.35	+0.03
3rd place, bronze medalist(s)	4	Germany	Adam Ammour; Benedikt Hertel	54.80	3	55.28	3	54.79	3	55.28	5	3:40.15	+0.83
4	10	United States	Frank Del Duca; Charlie Volker	54.90	4	55.35	4	54.87	4	55.26	4	3:40.38	+1.06
5	13	Switzerland	Michael Vogt; Andreas Haas	55.36	5	55.54	6	55.32	7	55.55	8	3:41.77	+2.45
6	3	Great Britain	Brad Hall; Taylor Lawrence	55.52	9	55.88	8	55.15	6	42	6	3:41.97	+2.65
7	8	South Korea	Kim Jin-su; Kim Hyeong-geun	55.38	6	55.92	9	55.35	8	55.53	7	3:42.18	+2.86
8	14	Romania	Mihai Tentea; George Iordache	55.51	8	55.97	10	55.49	9	55.58	9	3:42.55	+3.23
9	26	United States	Kristopher Horn; Joshua Williamson	57.23	29	55.40	5	55.00	5	55.09	5	3:42.72	+3.40
10	7	Switzerland	Cédric Follador; Quentin Juillard	55.46	7	56.11	15	55.58	12	55.67	10	3:42.82	+3.50
11	9	Latvia	Jēkabs Kalenda; Matīss Miknis	55.64	12	56.05	11	55.50	11	55.85	13	3:43.04	+3.72
12	33	United States	Geoffrey Gadbois; Bryce Cheek	55.57	10	55.87	7	55.49	9	56.24	17	3:43.17	+3.85
13	5	Italy	Patrick Baumgartner; Robert Mircea	55.67	13	56.16	18	55.74	14	55.69	11	3:43.26	+3.94
14	12	Monaco	Boris Vain; Antoine Riou	55.93	17	56.15	16	55.69	14	55.78	12	3:43.55	+4.23
15	18	Canada	Taylor Austin; Mike Evelyn	55.63	11	56.09	14	55.77	15	56.14	15	3:43.63	+4.31
16	19	Canada	Pat Norton; Shaquille Murray-Lawrence	55.84	15	56.08	12	55.87	16	56.16	16	3:43.95	+4.63
17	6	Switzerland	Timo Rohner; Gregory Jones	55.69	14	56.08	12	56.37	24	55.97	14	3:44.11	+4.79
18	15	China	Sun Kaizhi; Zhen Heng	55.84	15	56.15	16	55.94	17	56.36	20	3:44.29	+4.97
19	11	China	Li Chunjian; Ye Jielong	56.03	19	56.34	19	56.04	19	56.24	17	3:44.65	+5.33
20	28	Brazil	Edson Bindilatti; Edson Martins	56.21	21	56.37	21	56.05	20	56.30	19	3:44.93	+5.61
21	31	Jamaica	Shane Pitter; Tyquendo Tracey (r); Tyreek Bucknor	56.24	23	56.38	22	56.09	21	Did not advance			
22	21	Italy	Alex Verginer; Riccardo Ragazzi	56.23	22	56.35	20	56.14	22	Did not advance			
23	20	Czech Republic	Matěj Běhounek; Michal Dobeš	56.16	20	56.58	23	56.01	18	Did not advance			
24	27	Brazil	Gustavo Ferreira; Rafael Souza da Silva	56.65	26	56.84	24	56.39	25	Did not advance			
25	22	Israel	Adam Edelman; Regnārs Kirejevs	56.43	24	56.94	26	56.70	26	Did not advance			
26	24	Canada	Cyrus Gray; Kenny-Luketa M'Pindou	56.49	25	56.86	25	56.79	27	Did not advance			
27	32	Australia	Rhys Peters; Benjamin Forst	57.00	27	57.34	27	57.12	28	Did not advance			
28	25	Australia	Cam Scott; Patrick Castelli	57.29	30	57.44	28	57.17	29	Did not advance			
29	17	Austria	Jakob Mandlbauer; Daniel Bertschler	55.95	18	1:00.54	31	56.27	23	Did not advance			
30	30	Thailand	Kitthamet Palakai; Sittiphon Donpritee	58.54	31	58.56	30	59.04	30	Did not advance			
	16	Great Britain	Adam Baird; Oliver Butterworth	1:00.57	32	Did not finish							
	23	Czech Republic	Jáchym Procházka; Ondřej Rapp	Disqualified									
	29	South Korea	Suk Young-jin; Jung Hyun-woo	Did not start									
