= Bobsleigh at the 2022 Winter Olympics – Two-man =

Bobsleigh two-man at the XXIV Olympic Winter Games
- Bobsleigh
- Venue: Xiaohaituo Bobsleigh and Luge Track; Beijing
- Date: 14, 15 February 2022
- Competitors: 61 from 19 nations
- Teams: 30
- Winning time: 3:56.89

Medalists
1st place, gold medalist(s)		Francesco Friedrich; Thorsten Margis	Germany
2nd place, silver medalist(s)		Johannes Lochner; Florian Bauer	Germany
3rd place, bronze medalist(s)		Christoph Hafer; Matthias Sommer	Germany

The two-man competition in bobsleigh at the 2022 Winter Olympics was held on 14 February (heats 1 and 2) and 15 February (heats 3 and 4), at the Xiaohaituo Bobsleigh and Luge Track in Yanqing District of Beijing. The event was won by Francesco Friedrich and Thorsten Margis who repeated their 2018 success. Johannes Lochner and Florian Bauer won the silver medal, and Christoph Hafer and Matthias Sommer the bronze medal, for each of them the first Olympic medal. This was the only podium sweep at the 2022 Olympics.

The joint 2018 champions were Justin Kripps and Alexander Kopacz, and Friedrich and Margis. Kripps qualified for the Olympics, but now with a new brakeman, Cam Stones. The bronze medalists, Oskars Melbārdis and Jānis Strenga, stopped competing. Friedrich and Alexander Schüller were the 2021 World champions. Lochner and Eric Franke were the silver medalists, and Hans-Peter Hannighofer and Christian Röder were the bronze medalists. The 2021–22 Bobsleigh World Cup was completely dominated by Friedrich, who (with Margis and Schüller) won seven events out of eight. The eighth event was won by Rostislav Gaitiukevich and Mikhail Mordasov. Friedrich won the World Cup, followed by Kripps, Gaitiukevich, and Lochner.

== Qualification ==
There was a quota of 30 sleds available for the men's two-man event. Qualification was based on the world rankings of the 2021/2022 season between 15 October 2020 and 16 January 2022. Pilots must have competed in six different races on three different tracks and been ranked in at least five of those races. Additionally, the pilot must been ranked among the top 50 for the man's events or top 40 for the women's events.

For the men's races the IBSF ranking will be used. The top two nations in the rankings earned three sled each. The next seven nations earned two sleds each, while the next ten earned one sled each. The IBSF announced final quotas on January 24, 2022.

=== Summary ===
Sleds qualified	Countries	Athletes total	Nation
3	2	12	Germany; Canada
2	7	28	Switzerland; United States; Latvia; South Korea; China; ROC; Austria
1	10	20	Great Britain; France; Romania; Czech Republic; Italy; Monaco; Brazil; Trinidad and Tobago; Netherlands; Jamaica
30	19	60	

== Results ==
Rank	Bib	Athletes	Country	Run 1	Rank	Run 2	Rank	Run 3	Rank	Run 4	Rank	Total	Behind
1st place, gold medalist(s)	4	Francesco Friedrich; Thorsten Margis	Germany	59.02 TR	1	59.36	2	58.99 TR	1	59.52	1	3:56.89	—
2nd place, silver medalist(s)	6	Johannes Lochner; Florian Bauer	Germany	59.26	2	59.27	1	59.32	2	59.53	2	3:57.38	+0.49
3rd place, bronze medalist(s)	9	Christoph Hafer; Matthias Sommer	Germany	59.44	4	59.93	6	59.51	3	59.70	3	3:58.58	+1.69
4	11	Michael Vogt; Sandro Michel	Switzerland	59.57	7	59.90	3	59.59	5	59.77	4	3:58.83	+1.94
5	14	Benjamin Maier; Markus Sammer	Austria	59.51	5	59.96	8	59.64	6	1:00.01	9	3:59.12	+2.23
6	1	Rudy Rinaldi; Boris Vain	Monaco	59.62	9	59.90	3	59.57	4	1:00.05	10	3:59.14	+2.25
7	15	Christopher Spring; Mike Evelyn	Canada	59.54	6	1:00.03	10	59.76	8	59.93	5	3:59.26	+2.37
8	7	Rostislav Gaitiukevich; Aleksei Laptev	ROC	59.41	3	59.91	5	59.80	9	1:00.19	14	3:59.31	+2.42
9	12	Oskars Ķibermanis; Matīss Miknis	Latvia	59.65	10	59.94	7	59.82	10	59.93	5	3:59.34	+2.45
10	5	Justin Kripps; Cam Stones	Canada	59.61	8	1:00.08	14	59.71	7	1:00.00	8	3:59.40	+2.51
11	8	Brad Hall; Nick Gleeson	Great Britain	59.69	11	1:00.05	13	1:00.22	18	59.96	7	3:59.92	+3.03
12	13	Romain Heinrich; Dorian Hauterville	France	59.93	16	1:00.04	11	59.92	12	1:00.05	10	3:59.94	+3.05
13	17	Frank Del Duca; Hakeem Abdul-Saboor	United States	59.87	13	1:00.22	15	59.86	11	1:00.15	12	4:00.10	+3.21
14	22	Sun Kaizhi; Wu Qingze	China	1:00.04	19	1:00.01	9	59.99	13	1:00.25	15	4:00.29	+3.40
15	24	Dominik Dvořák; Jakub Nosek	Czech Republic	59.90	15	1:00.04	11	1:00.20	16	1:00.16	13	4:00.30	+3.41
16	19	Mihai Tentea; Ciprian Daroczi	Romania	59.83	12	1:00.46	22	1:00.19	15	1:00.28	16	4:00.76	+3.87
17	20	Emīls Cipulis; Edgars Nemme	Latvia	1:00.00	18	1:00.24	16	1:00.20	16	1:00.46	18	4:00.90	+4.01
18	10	Simon Friedli; Andreas Haas	Switzerland	59.97	17	1:00.37	20	1:00.47	23	1:00.34	17	4:01.15	+4.26
19	16	Won Yun-jong; Kim Jin-su	South Korea	59.89	14	1:00.28	17	1:00.10	14	1:00.97	20	4:01.24	+4.35
20	18	Taylor Austin; Daniel Sunderland	Canada	1:00.11	21	1:00.41	21	1:00.29	19	1:00.55	19	4:01.36	+4.47
21	26	Patrick Baumgartner; Robert Mircea	Italy	1:00.08	20	1:00.47	24	1:00.38	21	—N/a		3:00.93	—N/a
22	23	Li Chunjian; Liu Wei	China	1:00.31	24	1:00.36	18	1:00.43	22	—N/a		3:01.10	—N/a
23	3	Ivo de Bruin; Jelen Franjić	Netherlands	1:00.46	27	1:00.36	18	1:00.35	20	—N/a		3:01.17	—N/a
24	21	Suk Young-jin; Kim Hyeong-geun	South Korea	1:00.28	23	1:00.46	22	1:00.52	24	—N/a		3:01.26	—N/a
25	2	Maksim Andrianov; Vladislav Zharovtsev	ROC	1:00.24	22	1:00.75	26	1:00.55	26	—N/a		3:01.54	—N/a
26	25	Markus Treichl; Markus Glueck	Austria	1:00.42	26	1:00.52	25	1:00.66	27	—N/a		3:01.60	—N/a
27	28	Hunter Church; Charlie Volker	United States	1:00.38	25	1:01.40	30	1:00.53	25	—N/a		3:02.31	—N/a
28	29	Axel Brown; Andre Marcano (Run 1–2); Shakeel John (Run 3)	Trinidad and Tobago	1:00.81	28	1:00.89	27	1:00.86	28	—N/a		3:02.56	—N/a
29	27	Edson Bindilatti; Edson Martins	Brazil	1:01.11	29	1:01.36	29	1:01.34	29	—N/a		3:03.81	—N/a
30	30	Shanwayne Stephens; Nimroy Turgott	Jamaica	1:01.23	30	1:01.35	28	1:01.54	30	—N/a		3:04.12	—N/a
