= 2018 IBSF Junior & U23 World Championships =

The 2018 IBSF Junior & U23 World Championships took place at the St. Moritz-Celerina Olympic Bobrun in St.Moritz, Switzerland, from 25 to 28 January 2018.

== Schedule ==
Six events were held.

All times are local (UTC+1).

Date	Time	Events
25 January	09:00	Junior Women's skeleton
25 January	09:00	Junior Men's skeleton
27 January	09:30	Junior 2-women bobsleigh
27 January	09:30	U23 2-women bobsleigh
27 January	09:30	Junior 2-men bobsleigh
27 January	09:30	U23 2-men bobsleigh
28 January	09:30	Junior four-men bobsleigh
28 January	09:30	U23 four-men bobsleigh

== Medal summary ==
=== Medal table ===
Rank	Nation	Gold	Silver	Bronze	Total
1	Germany (GER)	6	3	5	14
2	Russia (RUS)	1	3	1	5
3	Romania (ROU)	1	1	0	2
4	Switzerland (SUI)	0	1	0	1
5	Austria (AUT)	0	0	1	1
5	China (CHN)	0	0	1	1
Totals (6 entries)		8	8	8	24

=== Bobsleigh ===
==== Junior ====
Event	Gold		Silver		Bronze	
Two-man	Germany; Richard Oelsner; Alexander Schueller	2:13.95	Germany; Christoph Hafer; Tobias Schneider	2:13.97	Austria; Benjamin Maier; Kilian Walch	2:14.11
Four-man	Germany; Pablo Nolte; Alexander Mair; Matthias Sommer; Florian Bauer	2:10.10	Germany; Christoph Hafer; Michael Salzer; Sebastian Mrowka; Tobias Schneider	2:10.18	Germany; Bennet Buchmüller; Paul Krenz; Christian Hammers; Costa Laurenz	2:10.45
Two-woman	Romania; Andreea Grecu; Florentina Iusco	2:18.46	Germany; Laura Nolte; Lavinia Pittschaft	2:18.77	Germany; Kim Kalicki; Lena Zelichowski	2:18.85

==== Under-23 ====
Event	Gold		Silver		Bronze	
Two-man	Germany; Richard Oelsner; Alexander Schueller	2:13.95	Romania; Mihai Tentea; Ciprian Daroczi	2:14.57	Germany; Jonas Jannusch; Benedikt Hertel	2:14.96
Four-man	Germany; Richard Oelsner; Benedikt Hertel; Alexander Schueller; Paul Straub	2:10.67	Switzerland; Michael Vogt; Alain Knuser; Silvio Weber; Sandro Michel	2:10.91	Russia; Aleksandr Bredikhin; Denis Korotkov; Vladislav Zharovtsev; Georgiy Kuzmenko	2:11.54
Two-woman	Germany; Laura Nolte; Lavinia Pittschaft	2:18.77	Russia; Polina Nazaruk; Victoria Shabalina	2:18.94	China; Ying Qing; He Xinyi	2:19.31

=== Skeleton ===
Event	Gold		Silver		Bronze	
Men	Nikita Tregubov; Russia	2:16.36	Vladislav Marchenkov; Russia	2:17.29	Felix Keisinger; Germany	2:17.46
Women	Anna Fernstädt; Germany	2:20.07	Yulia Kanakina; Russia	2:20.88	Susanne Kreher; Germany	2:21.08
