= IBSF European Championships 2023 =

2023 European Championships
- Venue: Altenberg bobsleigh, luge, and skeleton track
- Location: (Germany) Altenberg
- Dates: 20–22 January

The 2023 IBSF European Championships were held from 20 to 22 January 2023 in Altenberg, Germany.

With four gold medals, Germany was the top nation at the European championships as in the years before, and with eleven from eighteen medals, dominated the championships. However, Great Britain denied the Germans two gold medals in the male events, won on the first and the last event of the championships. This continued a pattern for the season of close competition on the male side between Germany and Great Britain, which would continue in the IBSF World Championships 2023, held later that month. Skeleton racer Matt Weston won his first international title in a competition where Great Britain took three of the first five positions. It was the first British medal in this competition since 2015. Two days later Brad Hall and his crew celebrated a first-ever European bobsleigh championship for the British team. After both runs Hall was nine hundredths of a second quicker than reigning world and Olympic champion in both bobsleighs Francesco Friedrich. Friedrich, who was still handicapped by a hamstring injury also failed to defend his title in the two-man sled and won the bronce medal.

== Schedule ==
Six events were held.

All times are local (UTC+1).

Skeleton

Date	Time	Events
20 January	11:30	Men run 1 & 2
20 January	15:30	Women run 1 & 2

Bobsleigh

Date	Time	Events
21 January	10:00	Women's Monobob run 1 & 2
21 January	14:30	Two-men run 1 & 2
22 January	09:15	Two-women run 1 & 2
22 January	14:30	Four-men run 1 & 2

== Medal summary ==
=== Medal table ===
* Host nation (Germany)

Rank	Nation	Gold	Silver	Bronze	Total
1	Germany*	4	2	5	11
2	Great Britain	2	0	0	2
3	Switzerland	0	2	1	3
4	Austria	0	1	0	1
4	Romania	0	1	0	1
Totals (5 entries)		6	6	6	18

=== Skeleton ===
Event	Gold		Silver		Bronze	
Men	Matt Weston; Great Britain	1:54.16	Christopher Grotheer; Germany	1:54.51	Axel Jungk; Germany	1:54.54
Women	Tina Hermann; Germany	1:56.52	Janine Flock; Austria	1:57.14	Susanne Kreher; Germany	1:57.15

=== Bobsleigh ===
Event	Gold		Silver		Bronze	
Women's Monobob	Laura Nolte; Germany	2:01.13	Andreea Grecu; Romania	2:02.45	Kim Kalicki; Germany	2:02.53
Two-woman	Germany; Laura Nolte; Neele Schuten	1:54.81	Switzerland; Melanie Hasler; Nadja Pasternack	1:55.36	Germany; Kim Kalicki; Anabel Galander	1:55.42
Two-man	Germany; Johannes Lochner; Erec Bruckert	1:51.50	Switzerland; Michael Vogt; Sandro Michel	1:51.55	Germany; Francesco Friedrich; Alexander Schüller	1:51.88
Four-man	Great Britain; Brad Hall; Arran Gulliver; Taylor Lawrence; Greg Cackett	1:49.32	Germany; Francesco Friedrich; Thorsten Margis; Candy Bauer; Felix Straub	1:49.41	Switzerland; Michael Vogt; Cyril Bieri; Alain Knuser; Sandro Michel	1:49.54

== See also ==
- Bobsleigh and Skeleton European Championship
