= IBSF World Championships 2020 – Four-man =

Four-man at the IBSF World Championships 2020
- Venue: Altenberg bobsleigh, luge, and skeleton track
- Location: Altenberg, Germany
- Dates: 29 February – 1 March
- Competitors: 88 from 14 nations
- Teams: 22
- Winning time: 3:36.09

Medalists
gold medal	Francesco Friedrich; Candy Bauer; Martin Grothkopp; Alexander Schüller	Germany
silver medal	Johannes Lochner; Florian Bauer; Christopher Weber; Christian Rasp	Germany
bronze medal	Nico Walther; Paul Krenz; Joshua Bluhm; Eric Franke	Germany

The Four-man competition at the IBSF World Championships 2020 was held on 29 February and 1 March 2020.

== Results ==
The first two runs were started on 29 February at 13:34. The last two runs were held on 1 March at 13:04.

Rank	Bib	Country	Run 1	Rank	Run 2	Rank	Run 3	Rank	Run 4	Rank	Total	Behind
1st place, gold medalist(s)	4	Germany	54.25	1	54.34	6	53.35	1	54.15	1	3:36.09	
2nd place, silver medalist(s)	5	Germany	54.25	1	54.31	5	53.39	2	54.19	2	3:36.14	+0.05
3rd place, bronze medalist(s)	11	Germany	54.30	3	54.20	2	53.44	3	54.38	3	3:36.32	+0.23
4	7	Latvia	54.36	5	54.19	1	53.59	5	54.49	4	3:36.63	+0.54
5	14	Austria	54.55	9	54.25	3	53.51	4	54.61	6	3:36.92	+0.83
6	10	Czech Republic	54.48	7	54.45	8	53.87	7	54.73	9	3:37.53	+1.44
7	1	Great Britain	54.60	10	54.63	16	53.83	6	54.64	8	3:37.70	+1.61
8	13	South Korea	54.50	8	54.55	11	53.93	8	54.85	12	3:37.83	+1.74
9	12	Switzerland	54.39	6	54.66	17	54.19	11	54.63	7	3:37.87	+1.78
10	16	Austria	54.81	13	54.62	14	53.98	9	54.60	5	3:38.01	+1.92
11	9	Russia	54.74	12	54.57	12	54.07	10	54.76	10	3:38.14	+2.05
12	22	Russia	54.85	14	54.43	7	54.29	12	54.86	13	3:38.43	+2.34
13	19	Latvia	55.07	17	54.49	9	54.41	14	54.80	11	3:38.77	+2.68
14	3	Italy	54.88	15	54.62	14	54.35	13	54.97	15	3:38.82	+2.73
15	2	France	54.71	11	54.55	10	54.61	15	55.30	17	3:39.17	+3.08
16	17	Switzerland	55.26	18	55.10	19	55.01	17	55.18	16	3:40.55	+4.46
17	20	Russia	55.54	21	55.36	21	55.06	19	54.93	14	3:40.89	+4.80
18	21	Japan	56.04	22	56.20	22	55.49	20	55.48	18	3:43.21	+7.12
19	18	Romania	55.26	18	54.61	13	54.98	16	58.46	19	3:43.31	+7.22
20	15	Great Britain	55.34	20	55.15	20	55.04	18	1:01.14	20	3:46.67	+10.58
21	8	United States	54.99	16	54.81	18	58.67	21	Did not advance			
	6	Canada	54.31	4	54.28	4	Did not start		Did not advance			
