= Del Sol Academy of the Performing Arts =

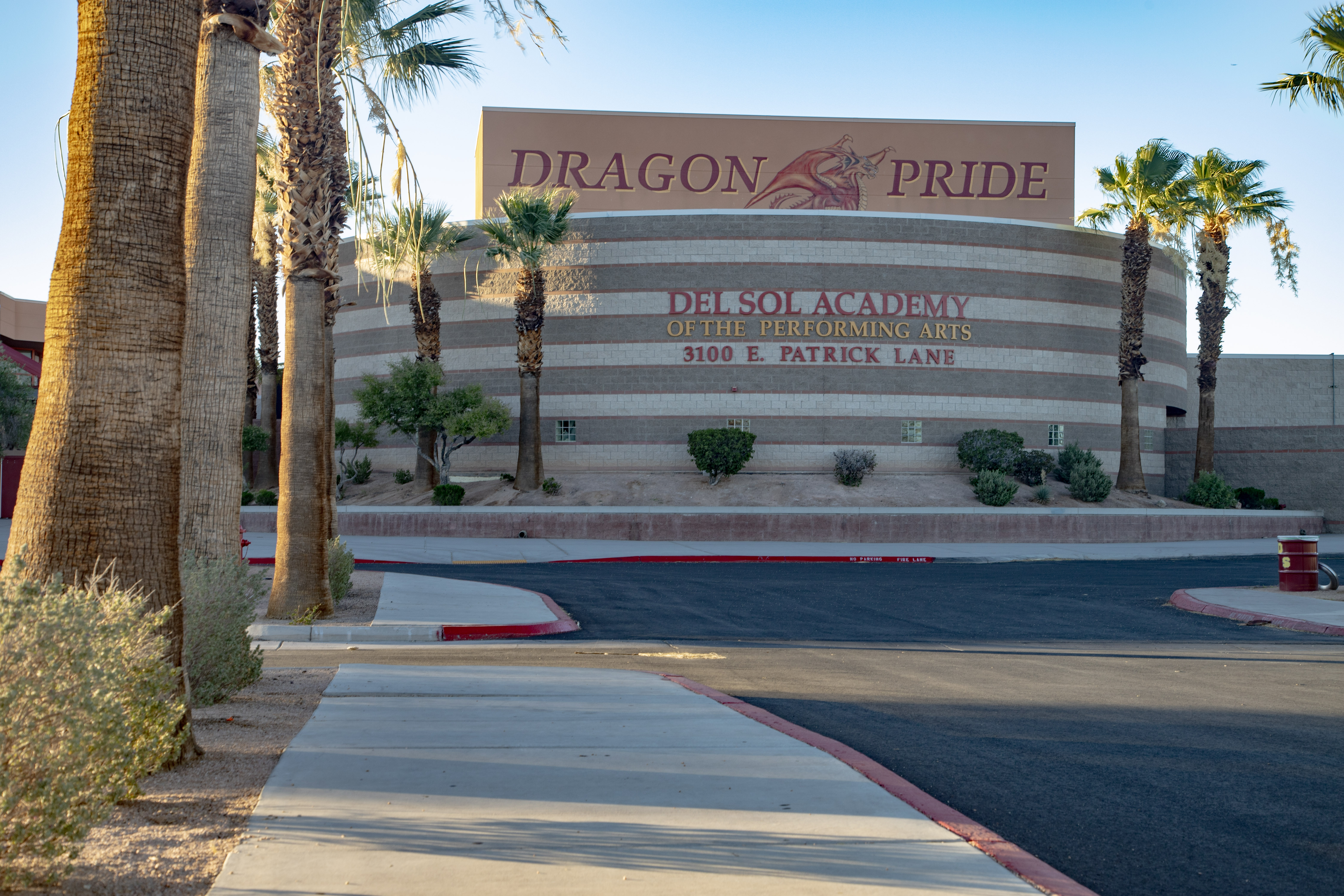

Location
- 3100 East Patrick Lane; Las Vegas, Nevada 89120; United States; 36.080507°N 115.106311°W

Information
- Type: Public high school
- Motto: Optimism, Modesty, Results
- Established: 2004; 22 years ago
- School district: Clark County School District
- Principal: Nadia Steger (Interim)
- Staff: 107.00 (FTE)
- Grades: 9-12
- Enrollment: 2,481 (2023-2024)
- Student to teacher ratio: 23.19
- Colors: Cardinal and Gold
- Athletics conference: Sunrise 4A Region
- Team name: Dragons, 2x4
- Rivals: Las Vegas Academy, Green Valley High School, Southwest CTA
- Website: www.delsolacademy.org

Del Sol Academy of the Performing Arts, commonly known as Del Sol High School, is a nine-month public high school in Las Vegas, Nevada and is part of the Clark County School District. Del Sol was one of three schools (including Canyon Springs and Spring Valley) to open in Fall 2004.

In 2016, Del Sol High School was reestablished as a performing arts academy focusing on band, costume design, dance, mariachi, music production, orchestra, theater, theater tech and vocal performance. Del Sol’s first state title in athletics was by the boys bowling team in 2018.

Former President Barack Obama spoke three times at Del Sol during his second term to rally support for immigration overhaul.

== Performing Arts Academy ==
=== Orchestra ===
Del Sol Academy's orchestra is taught by Marla Huizar and Ryan Villahermosa. The orchestra received a superior rating at festival in 2021. https://delsolacademyorchestra.com/

=== Band ===
Del Sol Academy’s band is taught by Paul Lowry, Marisa Davidson, and Michael Villarreal. Known as the "Dragon Fire Marching Band," the school received third place in the 2015 Henderson Winterfest parade, and second place in the 2024 Henderson Winterfest parade. As of 2024, Del Sol has one of the largest jazz programs in the Clark County School District with 5 jazz bands in the band program.

=== Costume Design ===
Del Sol Academy offers the only magnet-school concentration area focusing on costume design in the state. Five students were finalists in the Fashion Forward Design Competition in 2017.

=== Theater Tech ===
The school's theater technology program earned third place in the "Tech Olympics," a competition sponsored by Nevada Thespians.

== Extracurricular activities ==
- Del Sol's dance team was awarded first place honors at the Southern Utah University Shakespearean Festival.
- The school's Symphonic Band and Orchestra received all superior ratings in 2007.
- Del Sol holds an annual multicultural "extravaganza" highlighting the ethnic diversity of its students.
- In 2007, Del Sol's DECA club qualified seven of its members for an international DECA competition held in Orlando, Florida. In 2008, four members qualified for the competition held in Atlanta, Georgia.
- In 2012, Del Sol won the Flip the Script contest, a challenge issued by R&R Partners to end bullying in schools.
- In the 2012–2013 school year, Del Sol's drumline was awarded "Drumline of the Year" by Las Vegas radio station KLUC (98.5 FM).

== Athletics ==
=== Football ===
The Del Sol Dragons compete in the Southeast Division of the Sunrise 4A Region. The football team won the Southeast Division title in 2006 and has made it to the state semifinals in both of the previous two seasons. During the 2009–2010 season, Del Sol reached the state finals for football, although it lost to Bishop Gorman High School in the final game. Head football coach Preston Goroff resigned in that position to become the dean in 2013. Goroff's tenure as coach lasted ten years and culminated in one state championship appearance.

=== Wrestling ===
The wrestling program has producing two state placers—Chris Dunfield (twice all region, once all state, and second place in 2006) and Ashton Hill (twice all region, once all-state, and fourth in the 2007 state tournament). In 2006, the team placed eighth in the sunrise region. During the 2015–2016 school year, the wrestling team had one student become the state champion. In 2007, the women's tennis team reached the Nevada State Semi-Finals, losing to Bishop Gorman.

=== Sunrise 4A Regional titles ===
- Football: 2009

=== Sunrise 4A Region Southeast Division titles ===
- Football: 2006, 2008*, 2009

* - shared title

== Notable alumni ==
- Evan Weinstock (born 1991) — Olympic bobsledder
- Molly Bernard (born 1988) - Actress
- Trent Miller (born 1996) - UFC Fighter

== Feeder schools ==
- Jack Dailey Elementary School
- Gene Ward Elementary School
- Doris French Elementary School
- Lewis E. Rowe Elementary School
- Bill Y. Tomiyasu Elementary School
- Harley A. Harmon Elementary School
- Jim Thorpe Elementary School
- Nate Mack Elementary School
- David M. Cox Elementary School
- Louis Weiner Elementary School
- Charlotte Hill Elementary School
- Helen C. Cannon Junior High School
- William E. Orr Middle School
- C W Woodbury Middle School
- Jack L. Schofield Middle School
- Francis H. Cortney Junior High School
- Thurman White Middle School
- Barbara & Hank Greenspun Junior High School
