= Evan Weinstock =

American bobsledder

Personal information
- Born: October 30, 1991 (age 34) Las Vegas, Nevada, United States
- Education: Brown University (2014)
- Height: 6 ft 4 in (193 cm)
- Weight: 215 lb (98 kg)

Sport
- Country: United States
- Sport: Bobsleigh

Evan Weinstock (born October 30, 1991) is an American Olympic bobsledder.

== Early life ==
Weinstock was born and raised in Las Vegas, Nevada. His father, Arnold Weinstock, is Jewish. His mother was not. He told Jewish Sports Review that he was raised without a faith, but he had no problem being identified as a Jewish athlete.

== High school football ==
He played high school football as a wide receiver/safety and was the Nevada 4A Football Player of the Year at Del Sol High School in Las Vegas. He became involved in bobsledding by virtue of his participation in the decathlon. His football career ended in high school with a torn labrum that he suffered on a running play.

== College, decathlon, pentathlon, and heptathlon ==
At Brown University (2014), where he majored in biology, Weinstock set the university record in the decathlon (7,393 points), is second in university history in the pentathlon (5,296 points), and was a four-time Ivy League champion (three times in the decathlon, once in the heptathlon).

== Bobsled career ==
At the IBSF 2016 Bobsled World Championship Team Event with pilot Justin Olsen, he came in 10th in Igls, Austria. At the IBSF 2017 World Championship in Koenigssee, Germany, in the Two-Man with pilot Justin Olsen, he came in tied for 11th, and in the Four-Man for pilot Justin Olsen, he came in 11th.

He competed for the United States in the two-man event at the 2018 Winter Olympics. He and his team came in ninth place in the four-man bobsled, in 3:17.28, and came in 14th in the two-man bobsled.
