= Krzysztof Tylkowski =

Polish bobsledder

Personal information
- Nationality: Polish
- Born: 25 February 1988 (age 37); Poznań, Poland

Sport
- Sport: Bobsleigh

Krzysztof Tylkowski (born 25 February 1988) is a Polish bobsledder. He competed in the two-man event at the 2018 Winter Olympics.
