= Samuel Michener =

American bobsledder

Personal information
- Nationality: American
- Born: May 24, 1987 (age 39)

Sport
- Sport: Bobsleigh

Samuel Michener (born May 24, 1987) is an American bobsledder. He competed in the four-man event at the 2018 Winter Olympics.
