= Benedikt Hertel =

German bobsledder (born 1996)

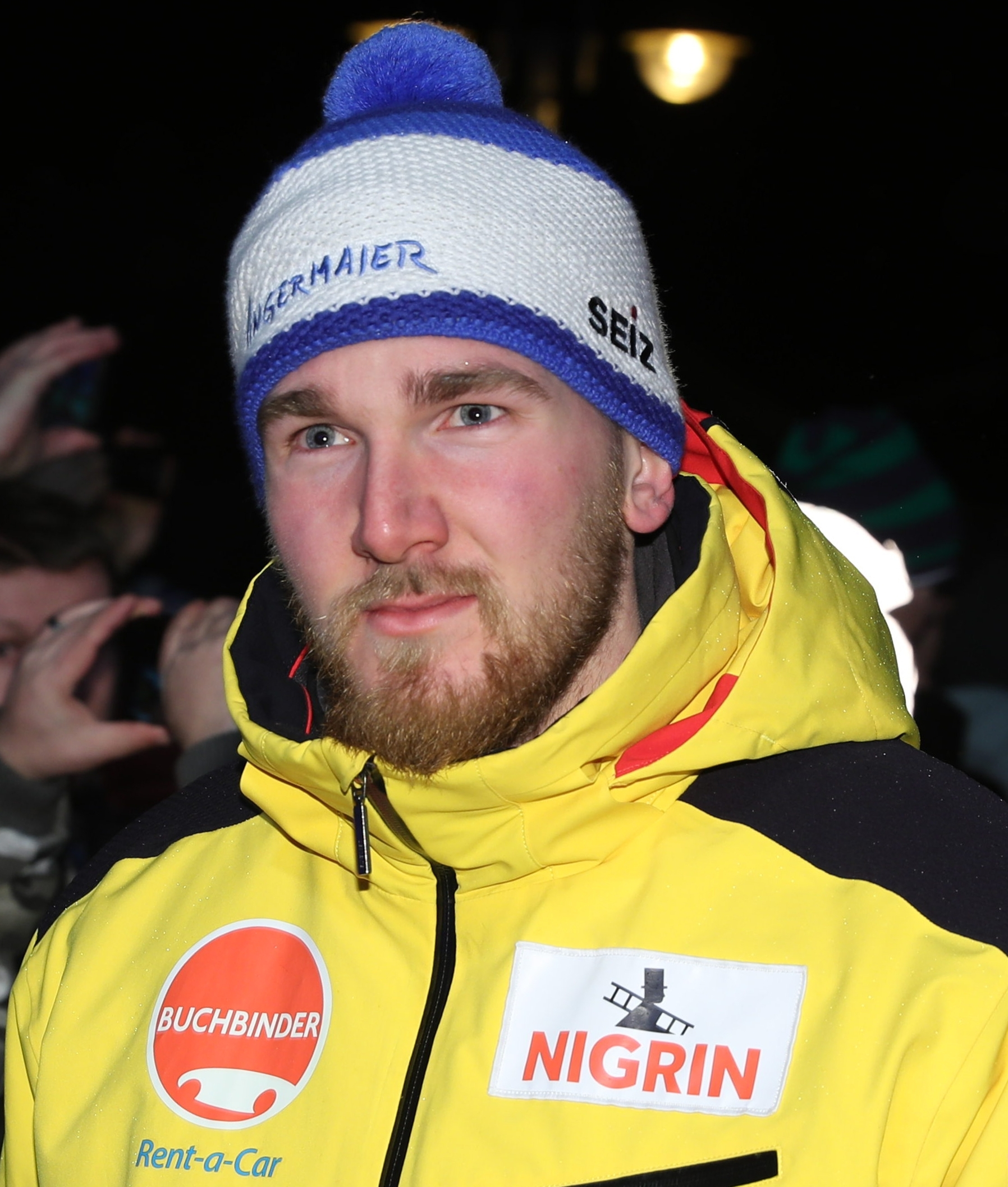
- Hertel in 2020

Personal information
- Born: 26 December 1996 (age 29)
- Height: 1.96 m (6 ft 5 in)
- Weight: 107 kg (236 lb)

Sport
- Country: Germany
- Sport: Bobsleigh
- Event(s): Two-man, four man
- Coached by: René Spies
Medal record
Men's bobsleigh
Representing Germany
World Championships
Bronze medal – third place	2024 Winterberg	Four-man
Bronze medal – third place	2025 Lake Placid	Two-man

Benedikt Hertel (born 26 December 1996) is a German bobsledder.

== Career ==
During his junior career, Hertel won gold in the four-man events at the 2017 IBSF Junior Bobsleigh World Championships and 2018 U23 World Championships. In January 2022, he competed at the IBSF Junior World Championships 2022 and won bronze medals in the two-man and four-man events.

Hertel represented Germany at the IBSF World Championships 2024 and won a bronze medal in the four-man event. He again represented Germany at the IBSF World Championships 2025 and won a bronze medal in the two-man event, along with Adam Ammour.
