= Kim Min-seong =

South Korean bobsledder

Personal information
- Nationality: South Korean
- Born: 3 December 1994 (age 30)

Sport
- Sport: Bobsleigh

Kim Min-seong (born 3 December 1994) is a South Korean bobsledder. She competed in the two-woman event at the 2018 Winter Olympics.
