= Joshua Williamson (bobsledder) =

American bobsledder (born 1996)

Personal information
- Born: August 27, 1996 (age 29) Florida, U.S.

Sport
- Country: United States
- Sport: Bobsleigh
- Event(s): Two-man, four-man

Joshua Williamson (born August 27, 1996) is an American bobsledder and a two-time Olympian.

== Early life ==
Joshua Williamson was born on August 29, 1996 in Florida, United States and spent his childhood there.

== Career ==
Williamson represented the United States at the 2022 Winter Olympics in the four-man events. In this event, he was part of the team that finished in 10th place with a time of 3:57.06.

Williamson competed in the IBSF World Championships 2025 and in both the two-man and four-man events and finished in fourth place in the latter.

In January 2026, Williamson and Frank Del Duca qualified for the 2026 Winter Olympics.
