= Rudy Rinaldi =

Monegasque bobsledder (born 1993)

Personal information
- Nationality: Monegasque
- Born: 18 August 1993 (age 33) Monaco
- Height: 180 cm (5 ft 11 in)
- Weight: 96 kg (212 lb)

Sport
- Sport: Bobsleigh

Rudy Rinaldi (born 18 August 1993) is a Monegasque bobsleigher. Rinaldi began his bobsleighing career in 2010, two years later in 2012, he represented Monaco at the inaugural Youth Olympic Winter Games winning a bronze medal alongside brakeman Jeremy Torre in the 2-Man Bobsleigh. This marked the first time the country had won any type of Olympic medal. He competed in the two-man event at the 2018 Winter Olympics finishing in 19th place. In January 2022, Rinaldi qualified to compete for Monaco at the 2022 Winter Olympics in the two-man bob event. Rinaldi and Boris Vain finished sixth in Beijing, 0.56 seconds back of the bronze medalists Christoph Hafer and Matthias Sommer; this is the closest any athlete from Monaco has come to winning an Olympic medal in an actual sporting event. (Julien Médecin won a bronze medal for architecture at the 1924 Olympics, but the IOC no longer considers art competition medals as part of the official tally). Following the 2022 Olympics, Rinaldi retired from bobsleighing.

He was Monaco’s flag-bearer during the closing ceremony of the 2014 Winter Olympics, and was the flag-bearer during the opening ceremony of the 2018 Winter Olympics.

Outside of the Olympics, Rinaldi represented Monaco in various competitions from 2013 to 2021, such as the Bobsleigh World Cup, European Championships and the IBSF Bobsleigh North American Cup, competing in both the two-man and four-man events. Rinaldi claimed his first senior international wins during the 2018–2019 IBSF North American Cup season in Park City, USA, claiming double gold in the two-man bobsleigh events on 19 and 20 November 2018. Then, on 21 November, he won in the four-man event.

== Personal life ==
Rinaldi’s family has a fishmonger business in Monaco, his older brother Anthony is also a former bobsleigher and served as a backup for Rinaldi and Boris Vain at the 2022 Winter Olympics.
