= Paul Krenz =

German bobsledder

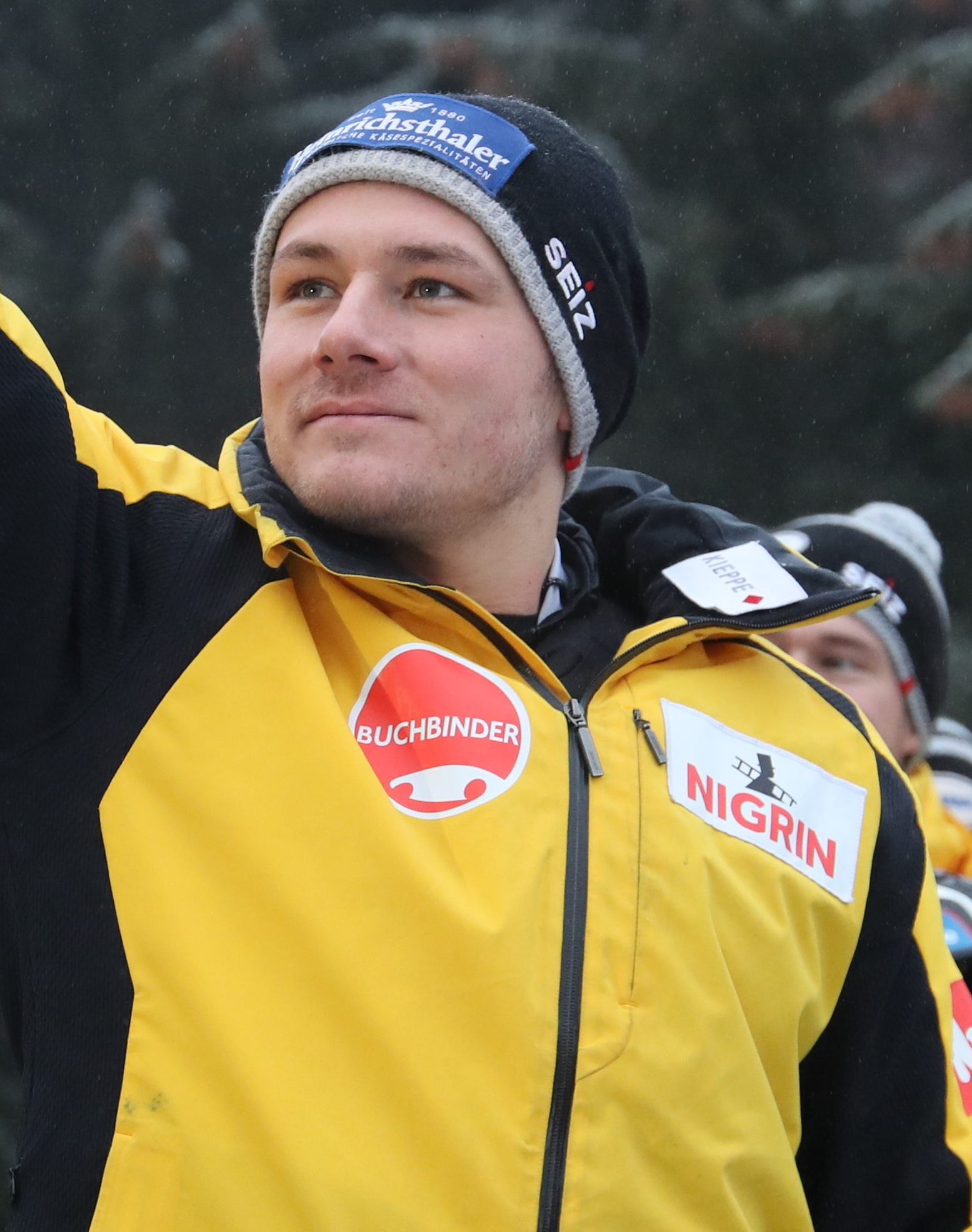

Personal information
- Nationality: German
- Born: 19 November 1991 (age 34) Berlin, Germany
- Height: 1.86 m (6 ft 1 in)
- Weight: 106 kg (234 lb)

Sport
- Country: Germany
- Sport: Bobsleigh
- Event: Two-man
- Club: Mitteldeutscher Sportclub Magdeburg
- Turned pro: 2014
Medal record
World Championships
| Bronze medal – third place | 2019 Whistler | Two-man |
| Bronze medal – third place | 2020 Altenberg | Four-man |

Paul Krenz (born 19 November 1991) is a German bobsledder.

He participated at the IBSF World Championships 2019, winning a medal.
