= Kim Yoo-ran =

South Korean bobsledder (born 1992)

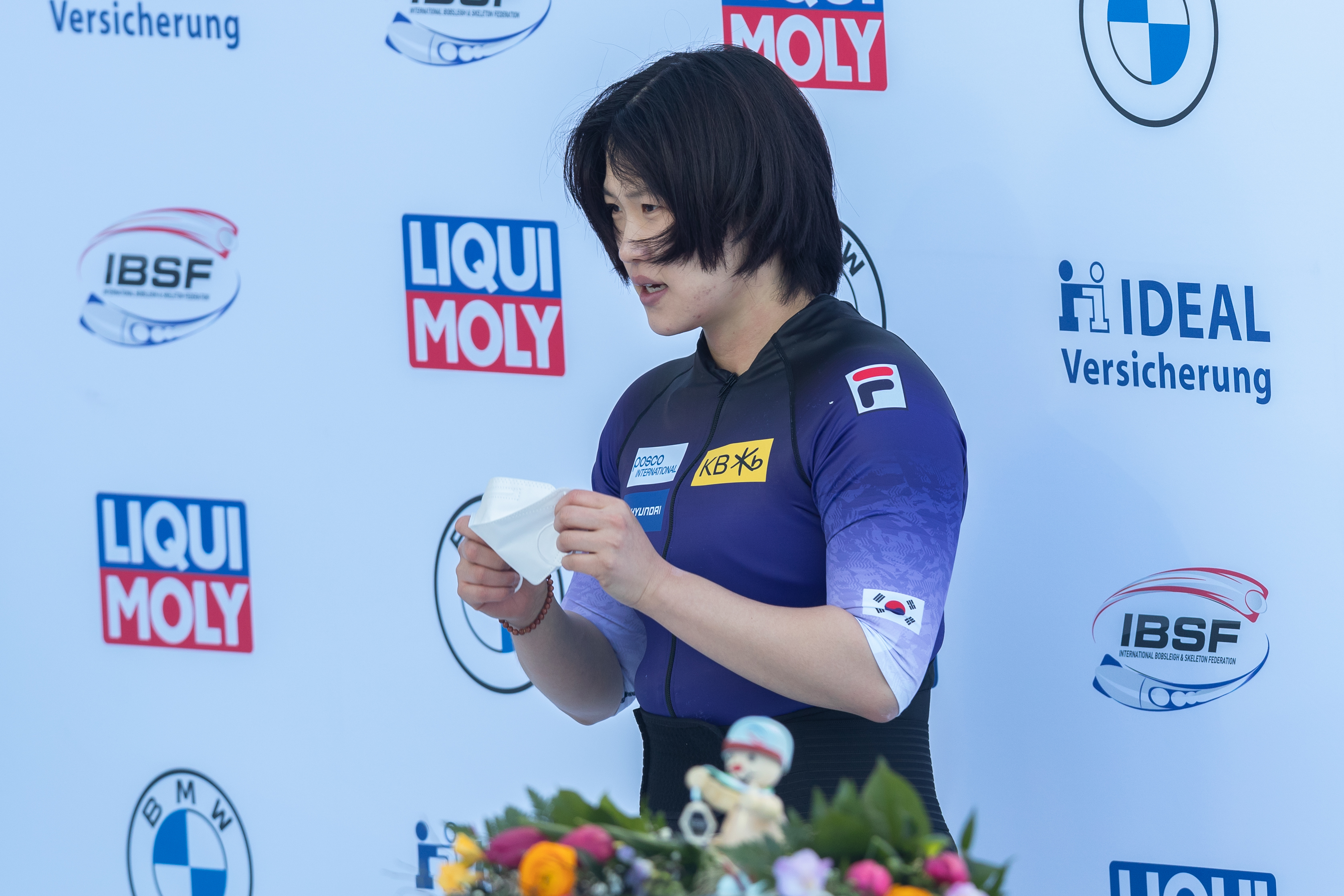
- Kim in 2021

Personal information
- Nationality: South Korean
- Born: 23 April 1992 (age 33)

Sport
- Sport: Bobsleigh

Kim Yoo-ran (born 23 April 1992) is a South Korean bobsledder. She competed in the two-woman event at the 2018 Winter Olympics.

She also competed in the monobob event at the IBSF World Championships 2021 held in Altenberg, Germany.
