= Kilian Walch =

Austrian bobsledder

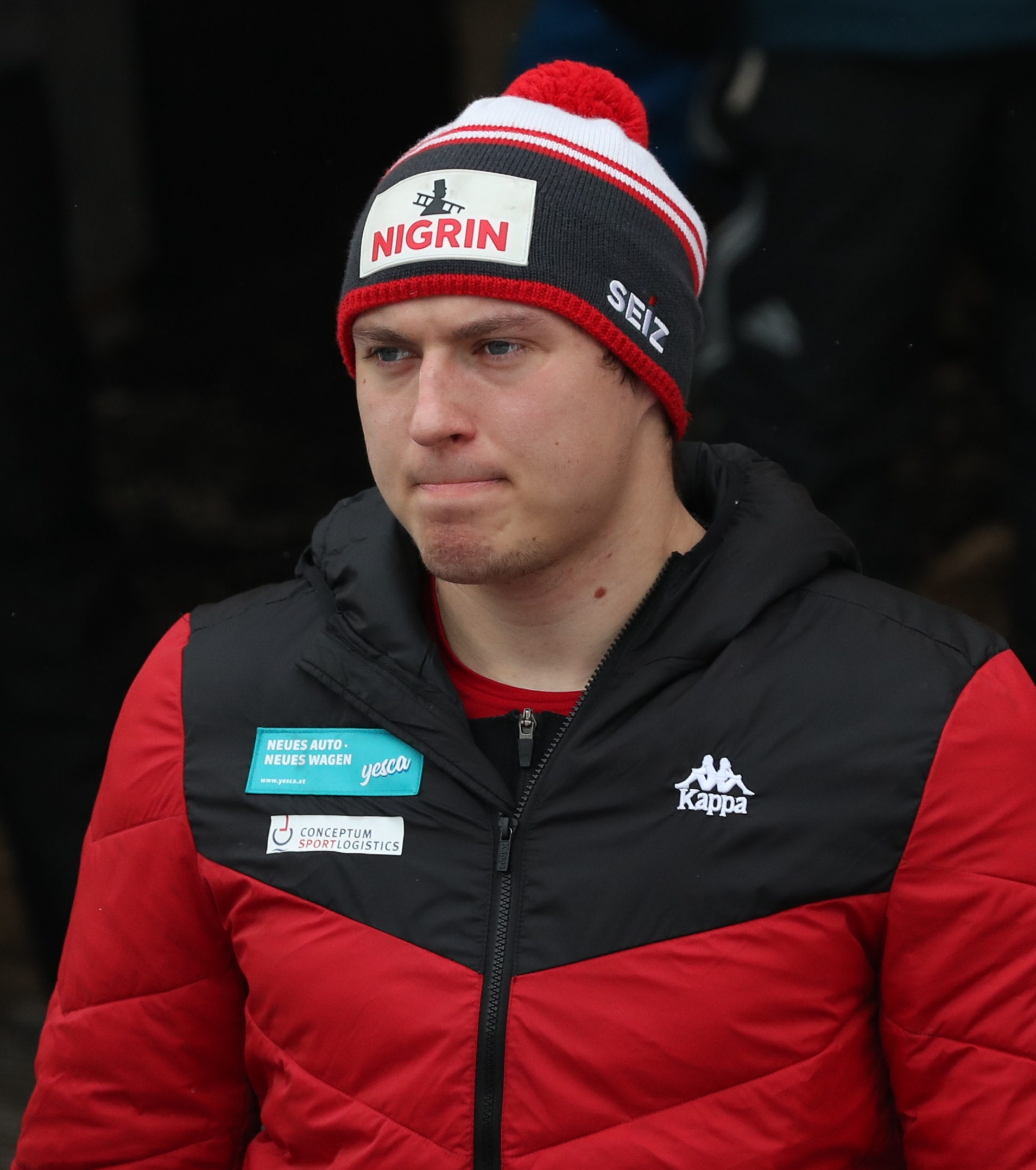
- Walch in 2019

Personal information
- Full name: Kilian Tobias Paul Walch
- Born: 24 January 1997 (age 29) Reutte, Austria
- Height: 191 cm (6 ft 3 in)

Sport
- Country: Austria
- Sport: Bobsleigh

Kilian Tobias Paul Walch (born 24 January 1997) is an Austrian bobsledder. He competed in the two-man event and the four-man event at the 2018 Winter Olympics.
