= Dorian Hauterville =

French bobsledder (born 1990)

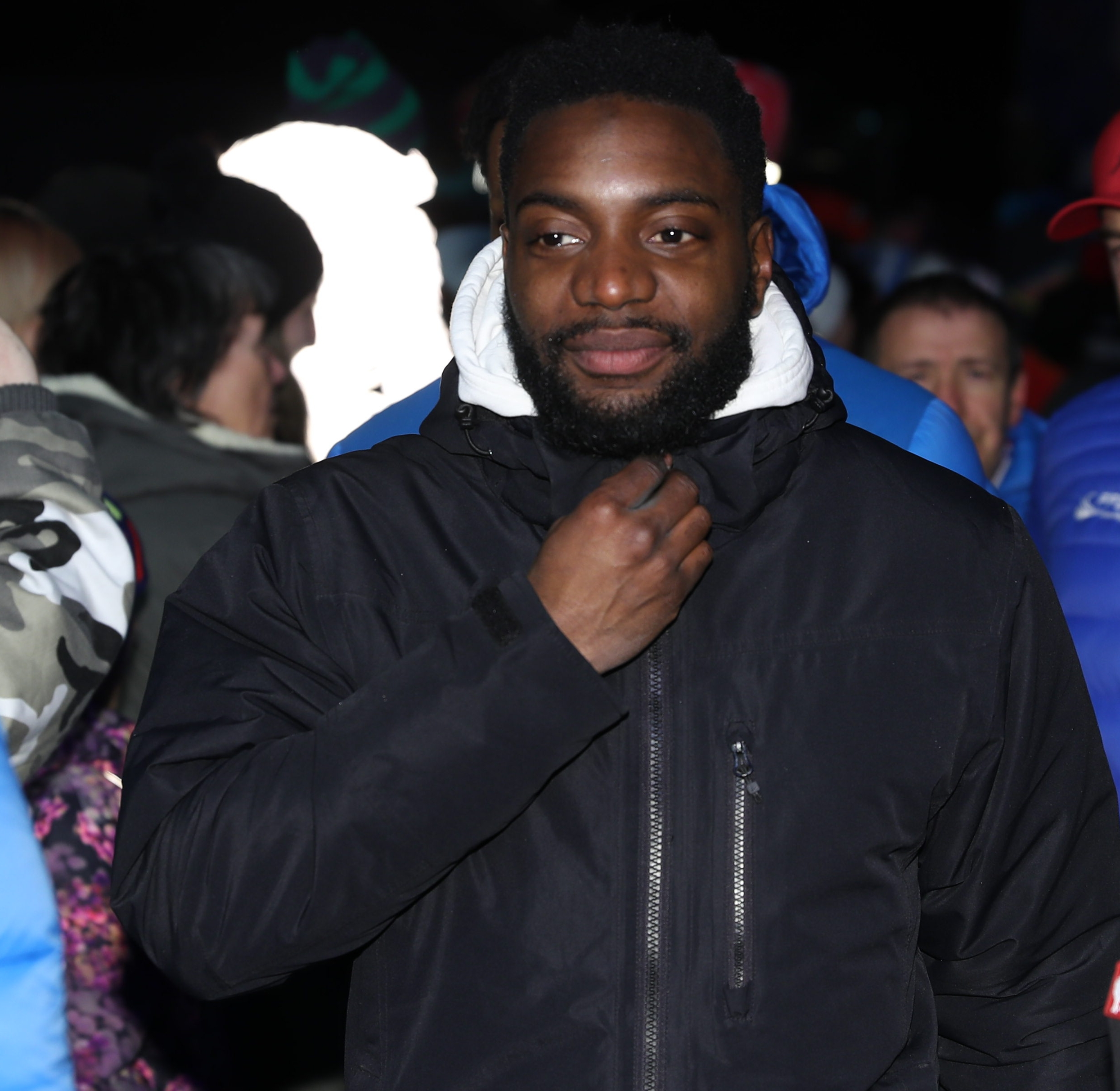
- Dorian Hauterville (2020)

Personal information
- Nationality: French
- Born: 27 April 1990 (age 36) Lyon, France

Sport
- Sport: Bobsleigh
Medal record
Men's bobsleigh
Representing France
European Championship
Bronze medal – third place	2019 Königssee	Two-man

Dorian Hauterville (born 27 April 1990) is a French bobsledder. He competed in the two-man event at the 2018 Winter Olympics. Born in Lyon, he is of Guadeloupean descent.
