= Sandro Michel =

Swiss bobsledder (born 1996)

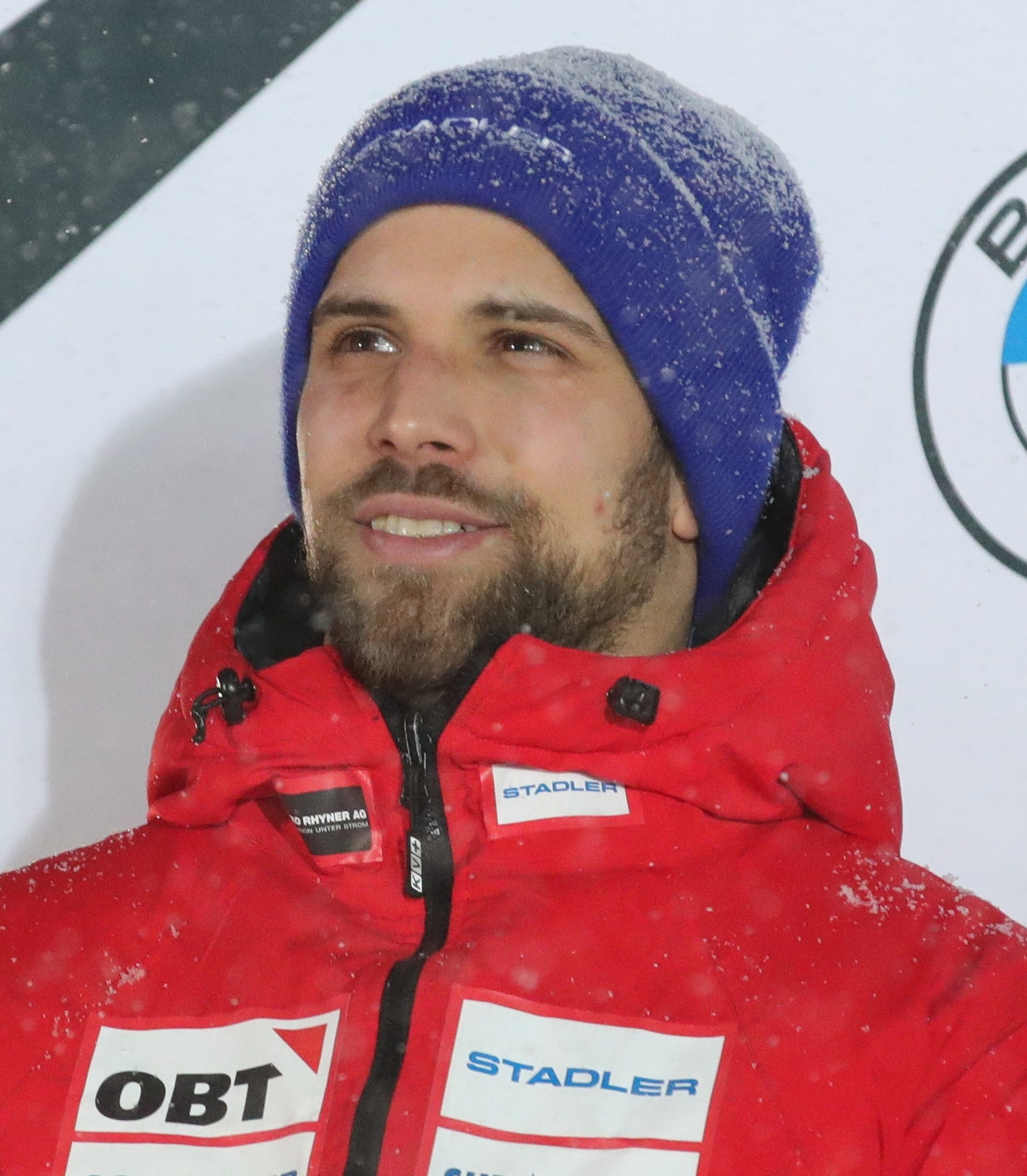
- Michel in 2023

Personal information
- Born: 1 July 1996 (age 29) Rheinfelden, Switzerland
- Height: 1.88 m (6 ft 2 in)
- Weight: 94 kg (207 lb)

Sport
- Country: Switzerland
- Sport: Bobsleigh
- Event(s): Two-man, four-man
Medal record
Men's bobsleigh
Representing Switzerland
World Championships
Bronze medal – third place	2023 St. Moritz	Two-man
European Championships
Silver medal – second place	2023 Altenberg	Two-man
Silver medal – second place	2024 Sigulda	Two-man
Bronze medal – third place	2023 Altenberg	Four-man

Sandro Michel (born 1 July 1996) is a Swiss bobsledder who represented Switzerland at the 2022 Winter Olympics.

== Career ==
Michel represented Switzerland at the 2022 Winter Olympics and finished in fourth place in the two-man event, along with Michael Vogt.

In January 2023, he competed at the IBSF European Championships 2023 and won a silver medal in the two-man event, and a bronze medal in the four-man event. A week later he competed at the IBSF World Championships 2023 and won a bronze medal in the two-man event along with Vogt, with a time of 4:22.34.

On 4 February 2024, he represented Switzerland at the IBSF European Championships 2024 and won a silver medal in the two-man event, along with Vogt. On 13 February 2024, he was involved in a crash during a training session, when he was thrown off the sled at the finish line, and the sled slid backwards and he was run over by the bobsleigh. He lost consciousness during the crash and was airlifted to a hospital. He had surgery for hip and thigh injuries, and also sustained broken ribs, a broken shoulder blade, torn muscles in the ribcage, and a pulmonary hemorrhage.

== Bobsleigh results ==
=== Olympic Games ===
Event	Two-man	Four-man
(China) 2022 Beijing	4th	11th

=== World Championships ===
Event	Two-man	Four-man
(Canada) 2019 Whistler	13th	–
(Germany) 2020 Altenberg	8th	–
(Germany) 2021 Altenberg	5th	13th
(Switzerland) 2023 St. Moritz	3rd	5th
