= Wang Sidong =

Chinese bobsledder

Personal information
- Nationality: Chinese
- Born: 23 September 1993 (age 31)

Sport
- Sport: Bobsleigh

Wang Sidong (Chinese: 王思栋; pinyin: Wáng Sīdòng; Mandarin pronunciation: [wǎŋ sɹ̩́ tʊ̂ŋ]; born 23 September 1993) is a Chinese bobsledder. He competed in the two-man event at the 2018 Winter Olympics.
