= Christopher Kinney =

American bobsledder

Christopher Kinney OLY
Personal information
- Nationality: American
- Born: November 9, 1988 (age 38)

Sport
- Sport: Bobsleigh

Christopher Kinney (born November 9, 1988) is an American bobsledder who placed 19th in the four-man event at the 2018 Winter Olympics. In 2020, he came out as bisexual.
