= Timo Rohner =

Swiss bobsledder (born 1997)

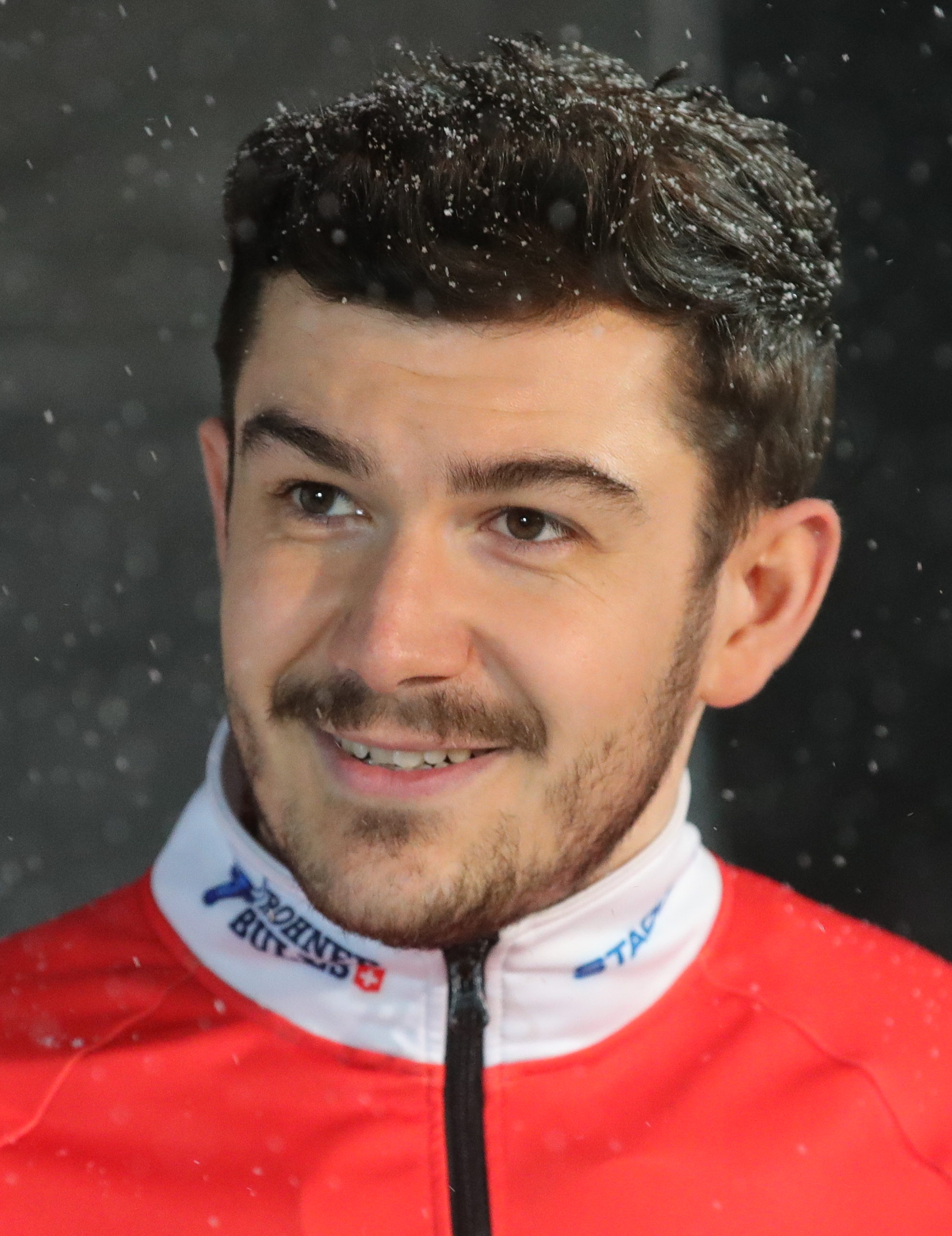
- Rohner at a World Cup event in at Altenberg in 2023

Personal information
- Nationality: Swiss
- Born: 28 October 1997 (age 28)

Sport
- Country: Switzerland
- Sport: Bobsleigh
- Events: Two-man, Four-man
- Turned pro: 2017
Medal record
Men's bobsleigh
Representing Switzerland
Junior World Championships
| Silver medal – second place | 2022 Innsbruck | Two-man |
| Bronze medal – third place | 2024 St. Moritz | Two-man |
| Bronze medal – third place | 2024 St. Moritz | Four-man |
Junior European Championships
| Silver medal – second place | 2022 Winterberg | Four-man |
| Bronze medal – third place | 2022 Winterberg | Two-man |
| Bronze medal – third place | 2024 Altenberg | Two-man |

Timo Rohner (born 28 October 1997) is a Swiss bobsledder. He was selected to represent Switzerland at the 2026 Winter Olympics.

He is the son of Marcel Rohner, who was a silver-medalist in bobsleigh at the 1998 Winter Olympics.

== Career ==
Rohner made his first professional bobsleigh start in 2017 as part of the Europe Cup. Rohner made his debut in the Bobsleigh World Cup in 2019. From 2019 through 2024 Rohner competed in both the World Cup and Europe Cup. In 2024, Rohner earned his first gold medal in the Europe Cup with a victory in the four-man competition at St. Moritz. Rohner qualified to be on Switzerland's primary World Cup team beginning with the 2024–25 season.

Rohner was selected to represent Switzerland at the 2026 Winter Olympics. He finished 15th in the two-man event.

== Bobsleigh results ==
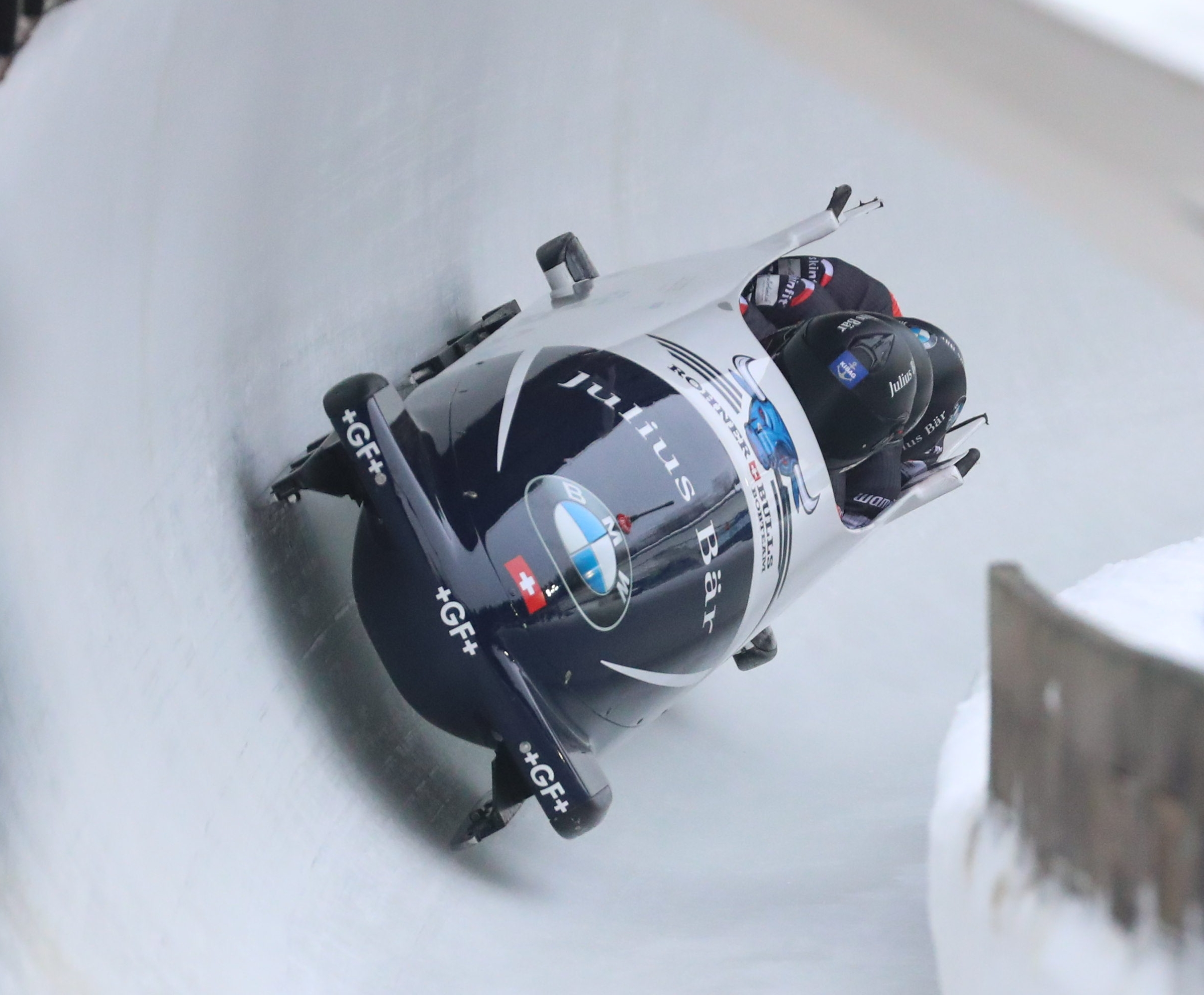
Rohner driving a four-man sled at Altenberg in 2020.

All results are sourced from the International Bobsleigh and Skeleton Federation (IBSF).

=== Olympic Games ===
| Event | Two-man | Four-man |
|---|---|---|
| (Italy) 2026 Milano Cortina | 15th | 15th |

=== World Championships ===
| Event | Two-man | Four-man |
|---|---|---|
| (Canada) 2019 Whistler | 25th | — |
| (Germany) 2020 Altenberg | — | 16th |
| (Switzerland) 2023 St. Moritz | 8th | 12th |
| (Germany) 2024 Winterberg | 12th | 14th |
| (United States) 2025 Lake Placid | 17th | 10th |
