= Shaquille Murray-Lawrence =

Canadian football player and bobsledder (born 1993)

No. 22
- Position: Running back

Personal information
- Born: October 30, 1993 (age 33); Scarborough, Ontario, Canada
- Listed height: 5 ft 8 in (1.73 m)
- Listed weight: 202 lb (92 kg)

Career information
- High school: Sir Wilfrid Laurier
- College: UNLV
- CFL draft: 2015: 3rd round, 23rd overall pick

Career history
- 2015–2017: BC Lions
- 2018: Montreal Alouettes*
- 2018: Saskatchewan Roughriders
- 2019–2020: Montreal Alouettes
- * Offseason or practice squad member only
- Stats at CFL.ca

Shaquille "Shaq" Murray-Lawrence (born October 30, 1993) is a Canadian former professional football running back and kickoff returner. He is also a member of the Canadian National Bobsled Team as a brakeman. He was a member of Team Canada at the Beijing 2022 Winter Olympics. He attended the University of Nevada, Las Vegas (UNLV). Murray-Lawrence was a member of the BC Lions, Saskatchewan Roughriders, and Montreal Alouettes.

== Early career ==
Murray-Lawrence played high school football for the Sir Wilfrid Laurier Blue Devils, where he earned team MVP from 2008–2010. He played at Lon Morris College in 2011 before the school closed due to financial difficulties in 2012. He played college football for the Tyler Apaches in 2012, recording 211 yards and three touchdowns on 21 carries.

Prior to the 2013 season, Murray-Lawrence transferred to the University of Nevada, Las Vegas to play for the UNLV Rebels. Despite being a backup during his first year with the Rebels, Murray-Lawrence rushed for 418 yards on 47 attempts and played in 12 games. He rushed for 552 yards and nine touchdowns in his senior year, despite playing only nine games. Murray-Lawrence took part in UNLV's 2015 Pro Day.

== Professional career ==
=== BC Lions ===
Murray-Lawrence impressed scouts at the 2015 CFL Combine by breaking the event's record for a 40-yard dash with a time of 4.41 seconds, although this record was broken later in the same event by Tevaughn Campbell with a time of 4.35 seconds. Murray-Lawrence was taken in the third round of the 2015 CFL draft by the BC Lions with the 23rd overall pick. After making the active roster, he debuted in the Lions' first game against the Ottawa Redblacks on July 4, 2015, where he ran four kick returns for 72 yards. Additionally, he ran for an 89-yard touchdown on a kickoff return that was nullified by a holding penalty. In three seasons with the Lions Murray-Lawrence played only sparingly; rushing the ball 47 times for 148 yards, catching 13 passes out of the backfield for 73 yards, and returning 60 kickoffs (42 of which occurred in 2015).

=== Montreal Alouettes ===
Murray-Lawrence became a free agent on February 13, 2018 and signed with the Montreal Alouettes on February 19, 2018. He was released on May 20, 2018.

=== Saskatchewan Roughriders ===
On October 4, 2018, Murray-Lawrence signed with the Saskatchewan Roughriders. He did not make an appearance for the club and became a free agent in February 2019.

=== Montreal Alouettes (II) ===
On August 22, 2019 Murray-Lawrence re-signed with the Montreal Alouettes as a member of their practice roster. He was released on January 20, 2021.

== Other sports ==
Murray-Lawrence was recruited by Bobsleigh Canada Skeleton to compete on Canada's Olympic bobsled team in 2017 but his injuries, which sidelined him from play in the CFL in 2017 and 2018, also prevented him from attending his first training camp until 2019; as of 2020, Murray-Lawrence was training alongside fellow CFL players Jacob Dearborn and Kayden Johnson. Murray-Lawrence attended the 2022 Winter Olympics as an alternate in four-man. He will compete for Canada in the 2026 Winter Olympics in both two-man and four-man.
