= Jin Jian =

Chinese bobsledder

Personal information
- Nationality: Chinese
- Born: 9 March 1994 (age 31)

Sport
- Sport: Bobsleigh

Jin Jian (Chinese: 金坚; pinyin: Jīn Jiān; Mandarin pronunciation: [tɕín tɕjɛ́n]; born 9 March 1994) is a Chinese bobsledder. He competed in the two-man event at the 2018 Winter Olympics.
