= Dražen Silić =

Croatian bobsledder (born 1985)

Personal information
- Nationality: Croatian
- Born: 25 May 1985 (age 41)

Sport
- Sport: Bobsleigh

Dražen Silić (pronounced [drǎʒen sǐːlitɕ, - sî-]; born 25 May 1985) is a Croatian bobsledder. He competed in the two-man event at the 2018 Winter Olympics.
