= Shao Yijun =

Chinese bobsledder

Personal information
- Nationality: Chinese
- Born: 30 November 1994 (age 31)
- Height: 1.89 m (6 ft 2 in)
- Weight: 105 kg (231 lb)

Sport
- Sport: Bobsleigh

Shao Yijun (born 30 November 1994) is a Chinese bobsledder. He competed in the 2018 Winter Olympics.
