= Ciprian Daroczi =

Romanian bobsledder

Personal information
- Nationality: Romanian
- Born: 15 May 1998 (age 28)

Sport
- Sport: Bobsleigh
Medal record
IBSF Junior World Championships
Silver medal – second place	2018 St. Moritz	Two-man (U23)
Gold medal – first place	2021 St. Moritz	Two-man (U23)
Bronze medal – third place	2021 St. Moritz	Two-man (Junior)

Ciprian Nicolae Daroczi (born 15 May 1998) is a Romanian bobsledder. He competed in the two-man event at the 2018 and 2022 Winter Olympics.
