= Frank Del Duca =

American bobsledder (born 1991)

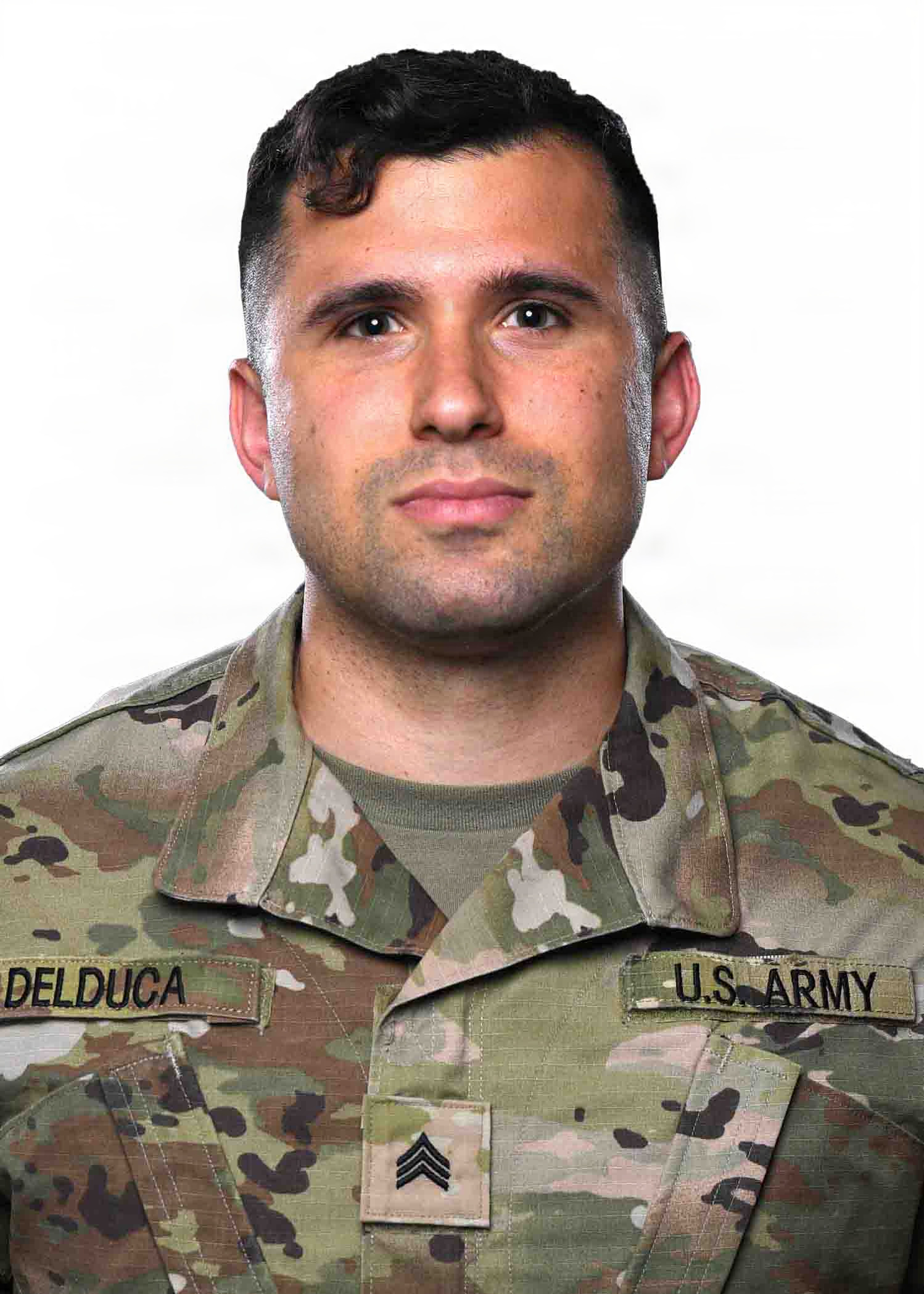
- Del Duca c. 2026

Personal information
- Born: July 7, 1991 (age 34) Broward County, Florida, U.S.
- Home town: Bethel, Maine, U.S.

Sport
- Country: United States
- Sport: Bobsleigh
- Event(s): Two-man, four-man

Frank Del Duca (born July 7, 1991) is an American bobsledder and a two-time Olympian.

== Early life ==
Del Duca grew up idolizing extreme sports athletes such as Ken Block, Brian Deegan, Tony Hawk and Travis Pastrana. He broke his tibia, fibula and ankle while skateboarding at ten years old.

After high school, he walked on to the track and field team at the University of Maine where he became an America East champion in the long jump.

== Bobsledding career ==
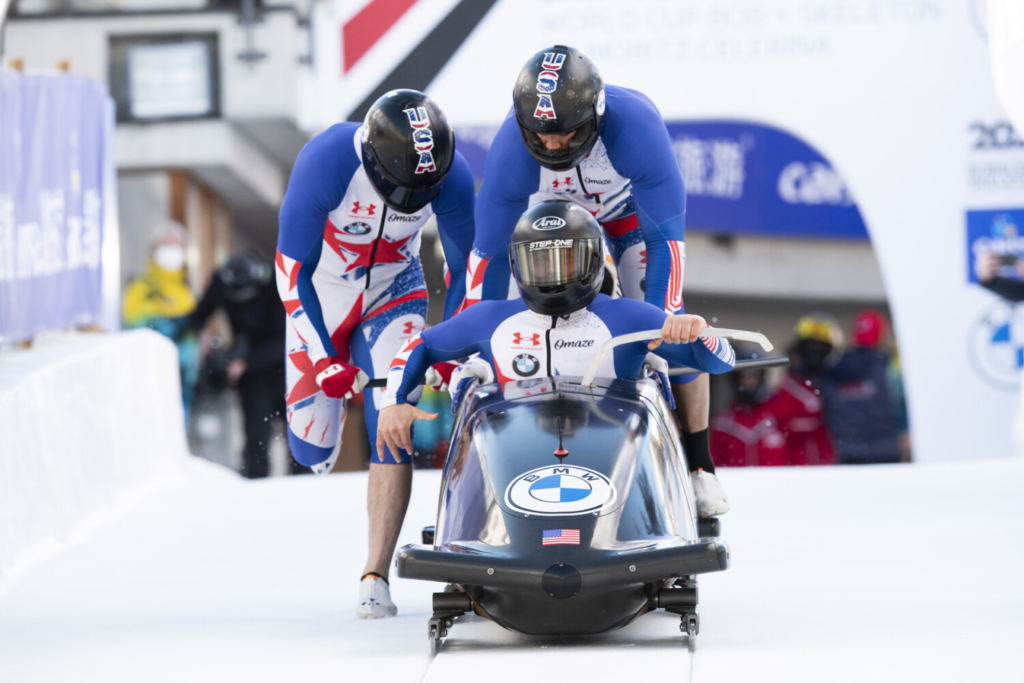
Frank Del Duca and team during the 2022 World Cup in St. Moritz, Switzerland.

Del Duca began bobsledding after attending a bobsled combine at the suggestion of a track coach. While attempting and failing to qualify for the 2018 Winter Olympics, he enlisted in the United States Army so that he could join the U.S. Army World Class Athlete Program.

Del Duca represented the United States at the 2022 Winter Olympics in the two-man and four-man events.

He competed in the IBSF World Championships 2025 and finished in fourth place in both the two-man and four-man events.

In January 2026, he was selected to represent the United States at the 2026 Winter Olympics. In February 2026, he and long-track speedskater Erin Jackson were elected by their teammates as the U.S. delegation's flagbearers during the 2026 Winter Olympics Parade of Nations.
