= Ying Qing =

Chinese bobsledder (born 1997)

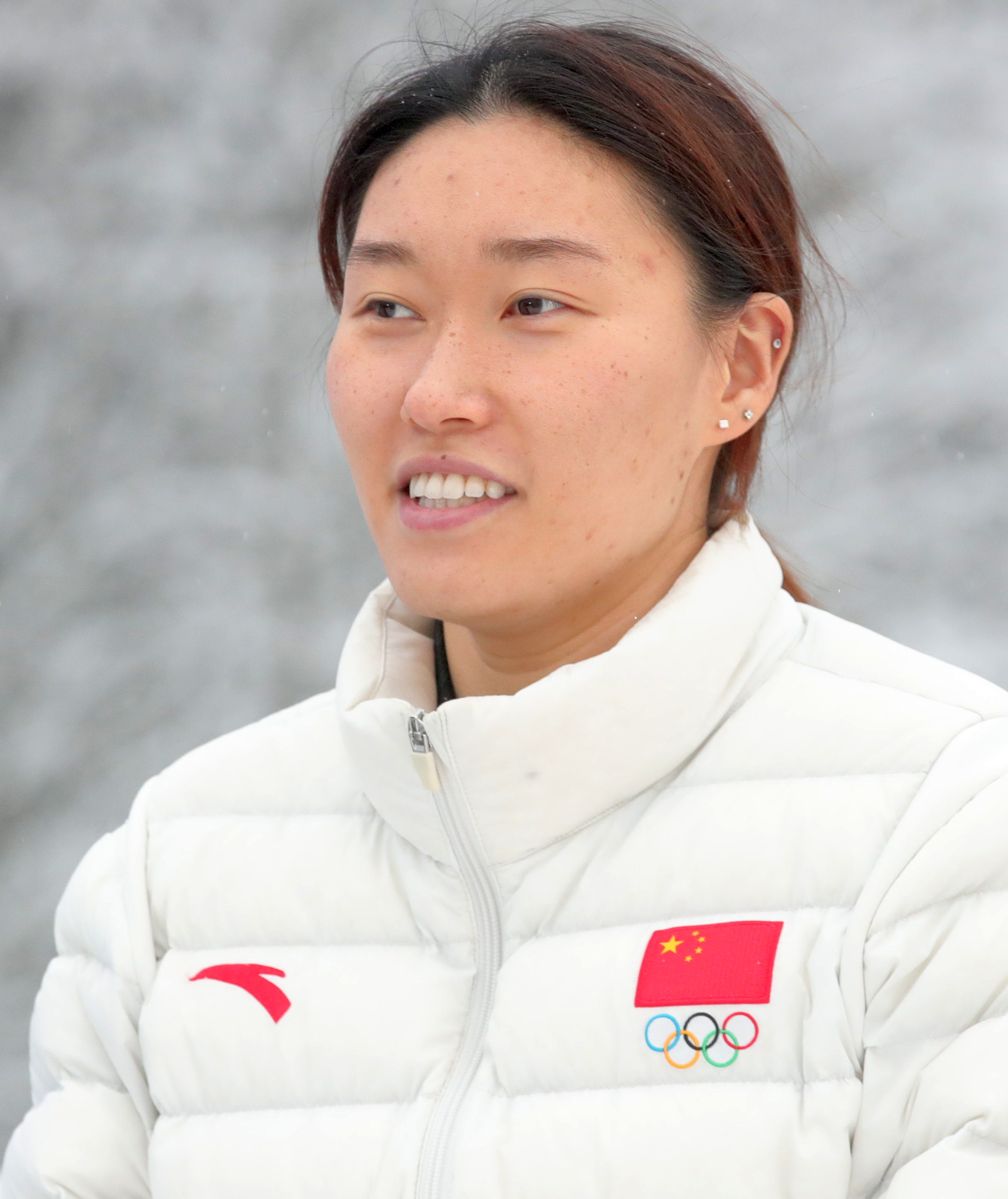
- Ying at a World Cup event at Altenberg in 2023

Personal information
- Nationality: Chinese
- Born: 10 February 1997 (age 29) Shanghai, China
- Height: 176 cm (5 ft 9 in)
- Weight: 70 kg (154 lb)

Sport
- Country: China
- Sport: Bobsleigh
- Events: Monobob, Two-woman
Medal record
Women's bobsleigh
Representing China
Junior World Championships
Bronze medal – third place	2020 Winterberg	Two-woman
Junior World Championships U23
Silver medal – second place	2020 Winterberg	Two-woman
Bronze medal – third place	2018 St. Moritz	Two-woman
Bronze medal – third place	2019 Königssee	Two-woman

Ying Qing (Chinese: 应清; born 10 February 1997) is a Chinese bobsledder. She represented China at the 2022 and 2026 Winter Olympics.

== Career ==
Prior to bobsled, Ying participated in track and field as a hurdler. She transitioned to bobsleigh in 2015, shortly after the announcement that Beijing would host the 2022 Winter Olympics. Ying made her professional debut in 2016 in the IBSF's Europe Cup. In 2017 she made her first appearance at the Bobsleigh World Championships with brakewoman Ma Yuanyuan, making them the first Chinese competitors to compete in the event. In 2020, Ying earned a silver medal in the Junior Under-23 World Championships in two-woman with brakewoman Du Jiani.

In 2023, Ying became the first female Chinese bobsledder to earn a medal in the Bobsleigh World Cup, earning a bronze medal at Sigulda in the monobob event during the 2022–23 season.

Ying was selected to represent China in both the 2022 and 2026 Winter Olympics in both monobob and two-woman. In 2022, Ying finished 9th in monobob and 14th in two-woman with brakewoman Du Jiani. In 2026, she finished 12th in the monobob, but only 22nd in two-woman, this time with Wang Yu as brakewoman.

== Bobsleigh results ==
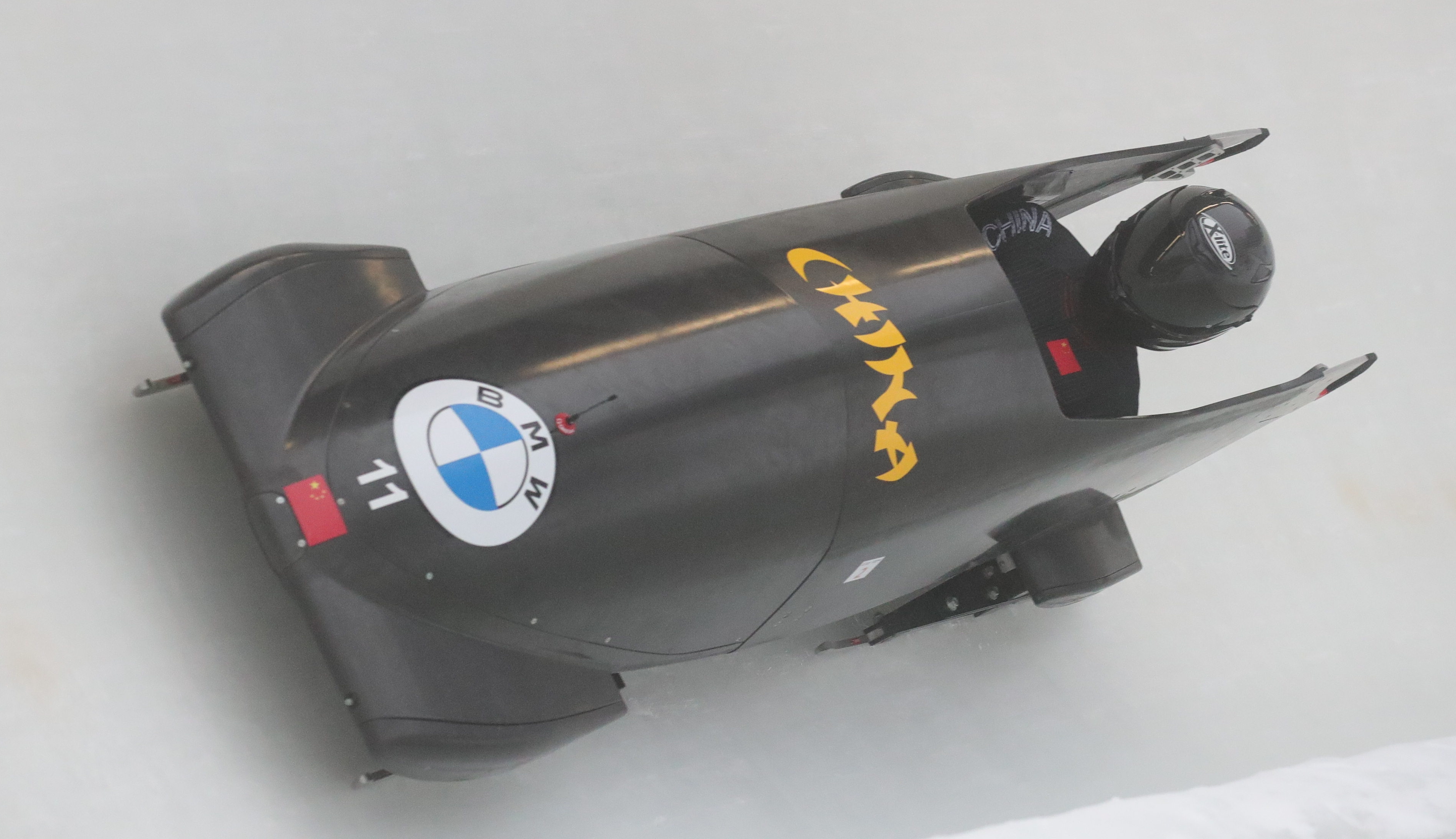
Ying competing in a monobob event at Altenberg in 2023.

All results are sourced from the International Bobsleigh and Skeleton Federation (IBSF).

=== Olympic Games ===
Event	Monobob	Two-woman
(China) 2022 Beijing	9th	14th
(Italy) 2026 Milano Cortina	12th	22nd

=== World Championships ===
Event	Monobob	Two-woman
(Germany) 2017 Königssee	—	20th
(Canada) 2019 Whistler	—	13th
(Germany) 2020 Altenberg	—	10th
(Switzerland) 2023 St. Moritz	DNF	9th
(Germany) 2024 Winterberg	15th	14th
