= Hakeem Abdul-Saboor =

American bobsledder (born 1987)

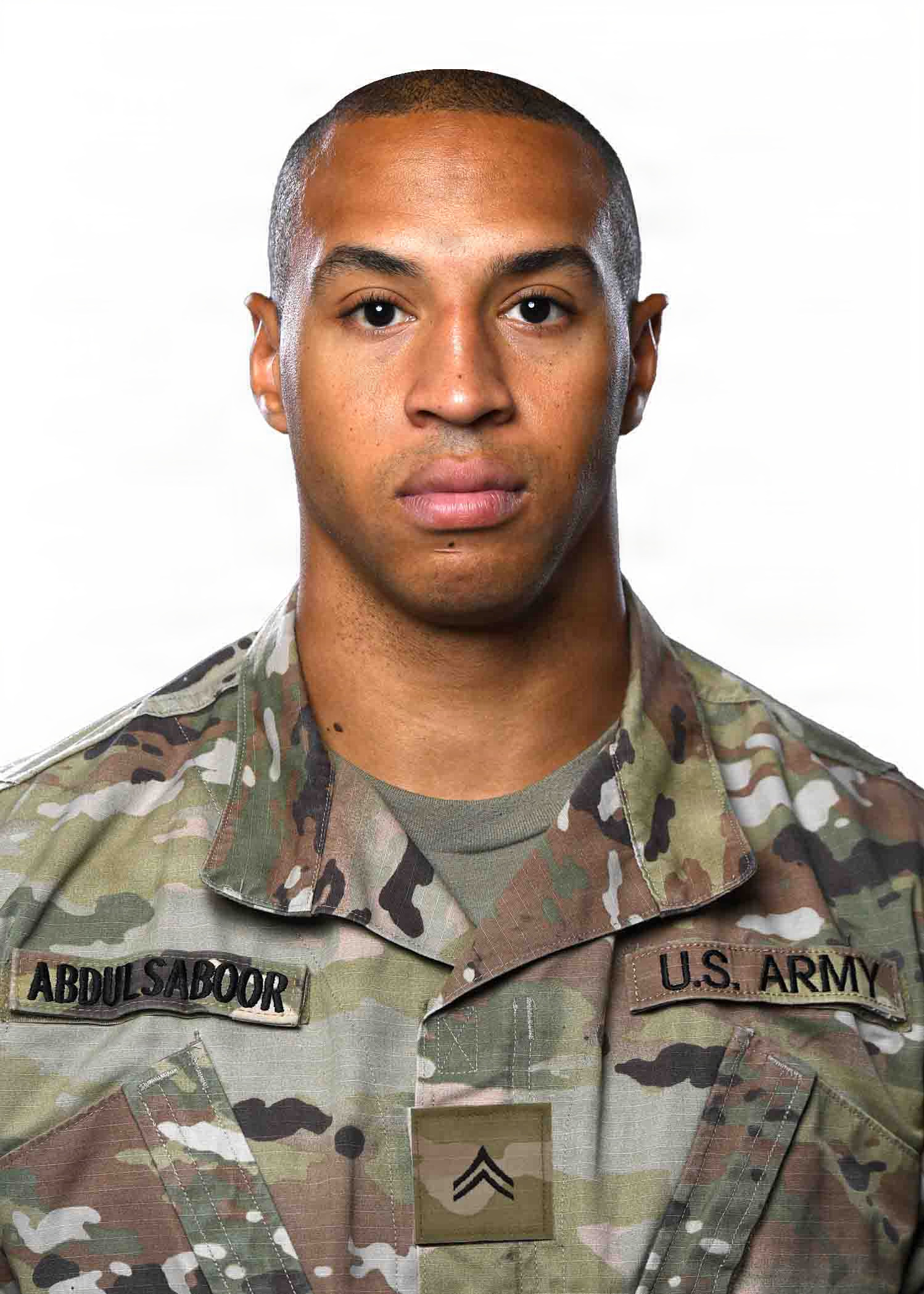
- Abdul-Saboor c. 2026

Personal information
- Born: November 7, 1987 (age 38) East Orange, New Jersey, U.S.

Sport
- Sport: Bobsleigh
- Club: U.S. Army WCAP

Hakeem Abdul-Saboor (born November 7, 1987) is an American bobsledder. He competed in the two-man event at the 2018 Winter Olympics. He qualified to represent the United States at the 2022 Winter Olympics.

He is a specialist in the United States Army, and also attended University of Virginia's College at Wise.
