= Geoffrey Gadbois =

American bobsledder (born 1994)

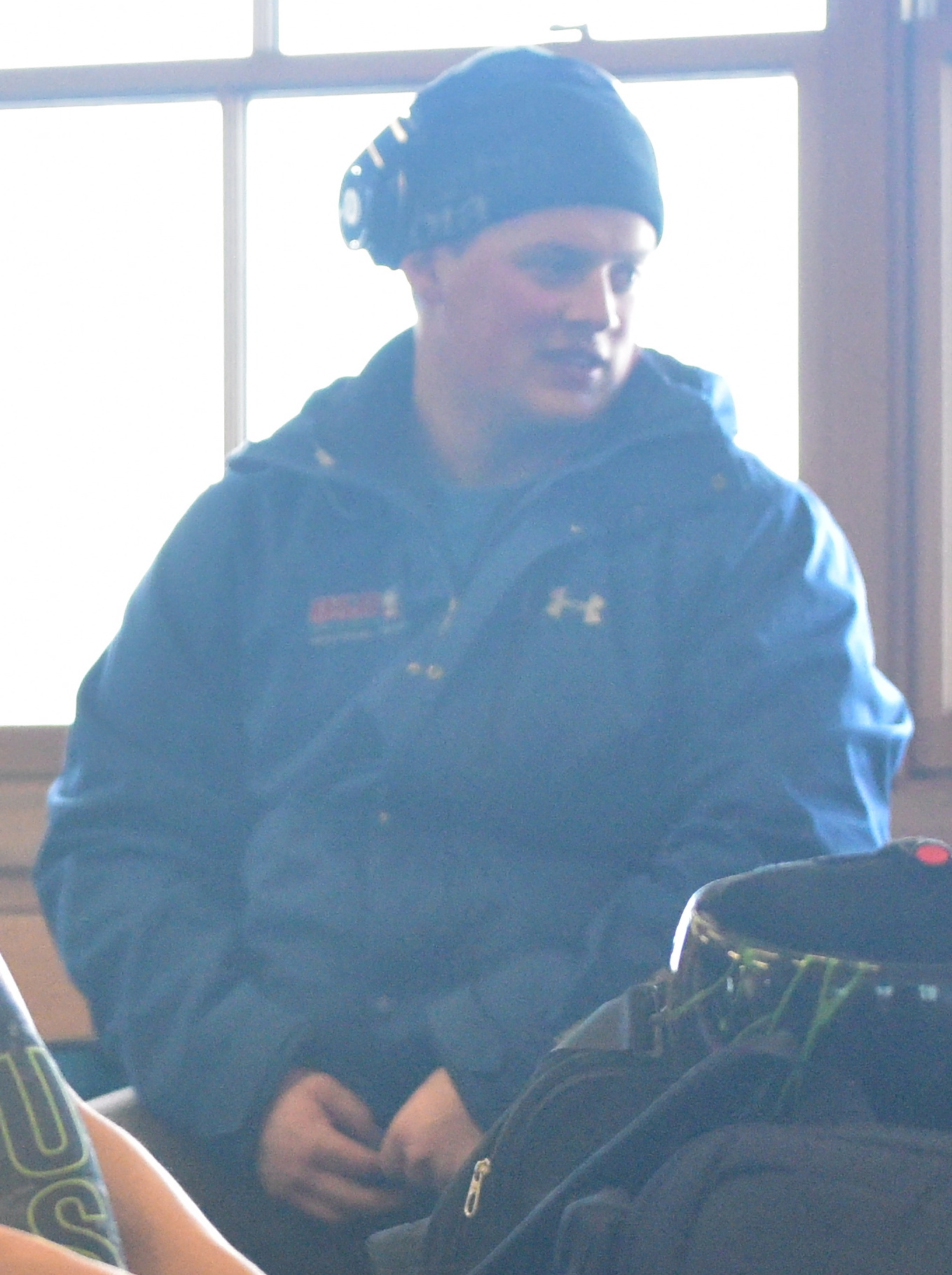

Personal information
- Nationality: American
- Born: November 4, 1994 (age 31) Burlington, Vermont
- Height: 5'10
- Weight: 215 lb (98 kg)

Sport
- Country: United States
- Sport: Bobsleigh
- Events: Two-man and Four-man
Medal record
World Championships
Silver medal – second place	2025 Whistler	Two-man bob
Bronze medal – third place	2019 Whistler	Mixed team

Geoffrey Gadbois (born November 4, 1994) is an American bobsledder.

He participated at the IBSF World Championships 2019, winning a medal.
