= Christoph Hafer =

German bobsledder (born 1992)

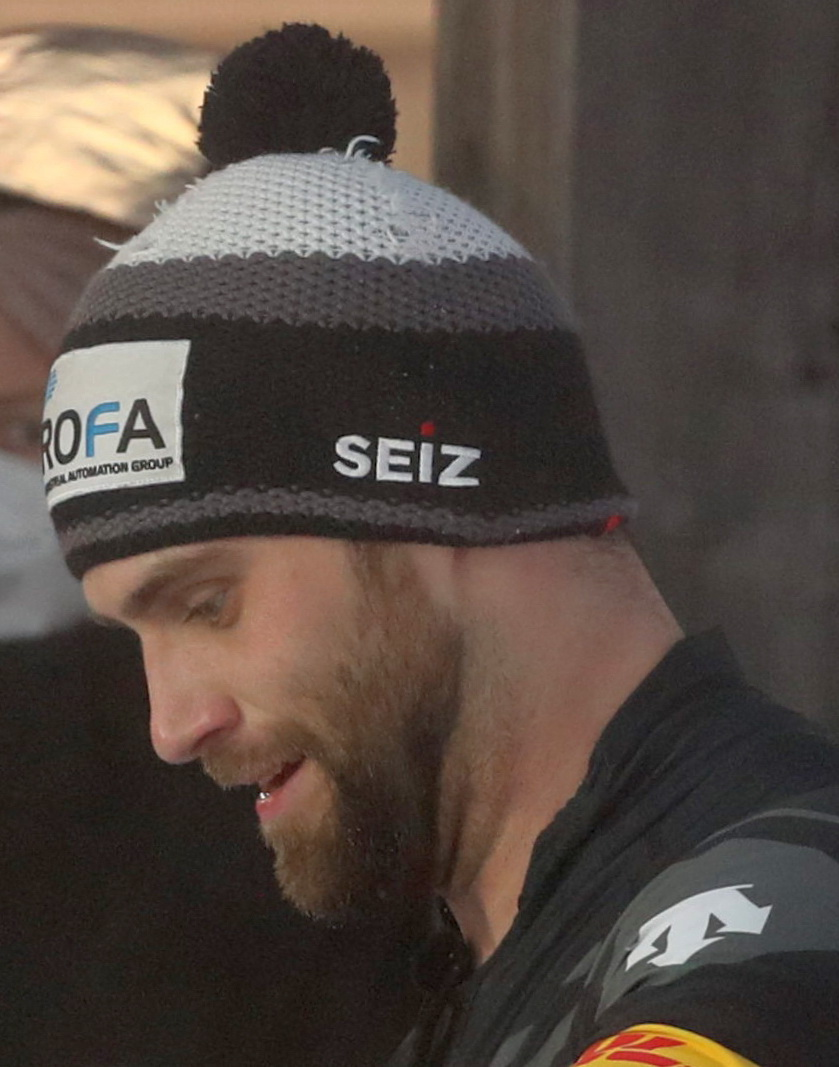
- Hafer in 2021

Personal information
- Nationality: German
- Born: 14 April 1992 (age 34) Bad Feilnbach, Germany
- Height: 1.94 m (6 ft 4 in)
- Weight: 105 kg (231 lb)

Sport
- Country: Germany
- Sport: Bobsleigh
- Events: Two-man; Four-man
- Club: BC Bad Feilnbach; Eintracht Wiesbaden
Medal record
Men's bobsleigh
Representing Germany
Olympic Games
Bronze medal – third place	2022 Beijing	Two-man
European Championships
Bronze medal – third place	2020 Sigulda	Two-man

Christoph Hafer (born 14 April 1992) is a German bobsledder.

== Career ==
Hafer started with the sport of luge on the Königssee bobsleigh, luge, and skeleton track at the age of nine. In 2010, he switched to bobsleigh and has been part of the German national team since 2014. Hafer starts for BC Bad Feilnbach and Eintracht Wiesbaden. He is coached by Thomas Prange. Since 2014, he has been in the top-level sport promotion with the Bavarian State Police where he holds the rank of Polizeimeister (Constable) since 2018.

In November 2025, Hafer announced his retirement from competitions.
