= Sun Kaizhi =

Chinese bobsledder (born 1996)

Personal information
- Nationality: Chinese
- Born: 9 December 1996 (age 29)
- Height: 183 cm (6 ft 0 in)
- Weight: 82 kg (181 lb)

Sport
- Country: China
- Sport: Bobsleigh
- Events: Two-man, Four-man
Medal record
Men's bobsleigh
Representing China
Junior World Championships U23
Gold medal – first place	2019 Königssee	Four-man
Gold medal – first place	2020 Winterberg	Four-man
Bronze medal – third place	2020 Winterberg	Two-man

Sun Kaizhi (Chinese: 孙楷智; born 9 December 1996) is a Chinese bobsledder. He represented China at the 2022 and 2026 Winter Olympics.

== Career ==
Sun began competing in bobsled in 2017 in the North America Cup. In 2019, Sun won a gold medal at the Under-23 Junior World Championships in four-man. At the 2020 Under-23 Junior World Championship, he won gold again in four-man, while also taking a bronze in two-man. In 2023, Sun finished third place in a four-man Bobsleigh World Cup event at Yanqing, marking the first time a Chinese team earned a podium in the World Cup. Sun continues to be a regular competitor in the World Cup.

Sun has represented China in the Winter Olympics in both 2022 and 2026, participating in both two-man and four-man at both games.

== Bobsleigh results ==
All results are sourced from the International Bobsleigh and Skeleton Federation (IBSF).

=== Olympic Games ===
Event	Two-man	Four-man
(China) 2022 Beijing	14th	16th
(Italy) 2026 Milano Cortina	16th	16th

=== World Championships ===
Event	Two-man	Four-man
(Canada) 2019 Whistler	23rd	20th
(Germany) 2024 Winterberg	21st	9th
(United States) 2025 Lake Placid	18th	12th
