= Boris Vain =

Monegasque bobsledder (born 1993)

Personal information
- Nationality: Monegasque
- Born: 11 March 1993 (age 32) Abbeville, France

Sport
- Sport: Bobsleigh

Boris Vain (born 11 March 1993) is a French born Monegasque bobsledder. He competed in the two-man event at the 2018 Winter Olympics. In January 2022, Vain qualified to compete for Monaco at the 2022 Winter Olympics in the two-man bob event. Vain and Rudy Rinaldi finished sixth in Beijing, 0.56 seconds back of the bronze medalists Christoph Hafer and Matthias Sommer of Germany; this is the closest any athlete from Monaco has ever come to winning an Olympic medal in an actual sporting event. (Julien Médecin won a bronze medal for architecture at the 1924 Olympics, but the IOC no longer considers art competition medals as part of the official tally).
