= Li Chunjian =

Chinese bobsledder (born 1996)

Personal information
- Nationality: Chinese
- Born: 3 April 1996 (age 29)

Sport
- Sport: Bobsleigh

Li Chunjian (Chinese: 李纯键; pinyin: Lǐ Chúnjiàn; Mandarin pronunciation: [lì ʈʂʰwə̌n tɕjɛ̂n]; born 3 April 1996) is a Chinese bobsledder. He competed in the two-man event at the 2018 and 2022 Winter Olympics.
