= 2022–23 Bobsleigh World Cup =

International bobsleigh competition

Winners
- Two-man: (Germany) Johannes Lochner (1)
- Four-man: (Germany) Francesco Friedrich (5)
- Combined men's: (Germany) Francesco Friedrich (6)
- Woman's Monobob: (United States) Kaillie Humphries (1)
- Two-woman: (Germany) Laura Nolte (1)
- Combined women's: (United States) Kaillie Humphries (1)

Competitions
- Venues: 7 (8 events)

The 2022–23 Bobsleigh World Cup was a multi-race series over a season for bobsleigh. The season started in Whistler, Canada on 26 November 2022 and ended in Sigulda, Latvia on 19 February 2023. The season sponsor was BMW.

== Calendar ==
Below is the schedule of the 2022/23 season.

=== Bobsleigh World Cup ===
Venue	Date	Details
(Canada) Whistler	26–27 November 2022	
(United States) Park City	3–4 December 2022	
(United States) Lake Placid	17–18 December 2022	
(Germany) Winterberg	7–8 January 2023	
(Germany) Altenberg	14–15 January 2023	
(Germany) Altenberg	21–22 January 2023	also European Championships
(Switzerland) St. Moritz	28 January–5 February 2023	World Championships (Doesn't count towards the World Cup standings)
(Austria) Innsbruck-Igls	11–12 February 2023	
(Latvia) Sigulda	18–19 February 2023	

== Map of world cup hosts ==
All 7 locations hosting world cup events in this season. (including St. Moritz – venue of the World Championships).

North America	Europe

== Results ==
=== Two-man ===
Event:	Gold:	Time	Silver:	Time	Bronze:	Time
(Canada) Whistler	Francesco Friedrich; Alexander Schüller; Germany	1:42.22 (51.03 / 51.19)	Brad Hall; Taylor Lawrence; Great Britain	1:42.33 (51.04 / 51.29)	Johannes Lochner; Erec Bruckert; Germany	1:42.68 (51.15 / 51.53)
(United States) Park City	Francesco Friedrich; Thorsten Margis; Germany	1:35.82 (48.15 / 47.67)	Brad Hall; Taylor Lawrence; Great Britain	1:36.08 (48.00 / 48.08)	Michael Vogt; Sandro Michel; Switzerland	1:36.14 (48.06 / 48.08)
(United States) Lake Placid	Johannes Lochner; Georg Fleischhauer; Germany	1:51.88 (55.90 / 55.98)	Francesco Friedrich; Alexander Schüller; Germany	1:52.20 (56.07 / 56.13)	Michael Vogt; Sandro Michel; Switzerland	1:52.26 (56.11 / 56.15)
(Germany) Winterberg	Johannes Lochner; Georg Fleischhauer; Germany	1:51.17 (55.56 / 55.61)	Michael Vogt; Sandro Michel; Switzerland	1:51.31 (55.70 / 55.61)	Brad Hall; Taylor Lawrence; Great Britain	1:51.44 (55.67 / 55.77)
(Germany) Altenberg 1	Johannes Lochner; Georg Fleischhauer; Germany	1:49.20 (54.39 / 54.81)	Brad Hall; Taylor Lawrence; Great Britain	1:49.63 (54.59 / 55.04)	Francesco Friedrich; Alexander Schüller; Germany	1:50.26 (55.01 / 55.25)
(Germany) Altenberg 2	Johannes Lochner; Erec Bruckert; Germany	1:51.50 (55.60 / 55.90)	Michael Vogt; Sandro Michel; Switzerland	1:51.55 (55.50 / 56.05)	Francesco Friedrich; Alexander Schüller; Germany	1:51.88 (55.53 / 56.35)
(Latvia) Sigulda 1	Johannes Lochner; Georg Fleischhauer; Germany	1:40.37 (49.74 / 50.63)	Francesco Friedrich; Alexander Schüller; Germany	1:40.73 (49.88 / 50.85)	Maximilian Illmann; Joshue Tasche; Germany	1:40.75 (50.17 / 50.58)
(Latvia) Sigulda 2	Johannes Lochner; Georg Fleischhauer; Germany	1:39.90 (49.91 / 49.99)	Francesco Friedrich; Thorsten Margis; Germany	1:40.26 (50.07 / 50.19)	Michael Vogt; Sandro Michel; Switzerland	1:40.34 (50.08 / 50.26)

=== Four-man ===
Event:	Gold:	Time	Silver:	Time	Bronze:	Time
(Canada) Whistler	Francesco Friedrich; Thorsten Margis; Candy Bauer; Alexander Schüller; Germany	1:41.56 (50.99 / 50.57)	Brad Hall; Arran Gulliver; Taylor Lawrence; Greg Cackett; Great Britain	1:41.98 (51.14 / 50.84)	Taylor Austin; Shaquille Murray-Lawrence; Cyrus Gray; Davidson de Souza; Canada	1:42.37 (51.09 / 51.28)
(United States) Park City	Francesco Friedrich; Thorsten Margis; Candy Bauer; Alexander Schüller; Germany	1:33.62 (46.74 / 46.88)	Johannes Lochner; Erec Bruckert; Georg Fleischhauer; Christian Rasp; Germany	1:33.85 (46.92 / 46.93)	Christoph Hafer; Michael Salzer; Matthias Sommer; Tobias Schneider; Germany	1:33.86 (46.94 / 46.92)
(United States) Lake Placid	Brad Hall; Arran Gulliver; Taylor Lawrence; Greg Cackett; Great Britain	1:50.36 (55.18 / 55.18)	Francesco Friedrich; Thorsten Margis; Candy Bauer; Felix Straub; Germany	1:50.37 (55.20 / 55.17)	Christoph Hafer; Michael Salzer; Kevin Korona; Tobias Schneider; Germany	1:50.43 (55.12 / 55.31)
(Germany) Winterberg	Francesco Friedrich; Thorsten Margis; Candy Bauer; Alexander Schüller; Germany	1:49.07 (54.41 / 54.66)	Brad Hall; Arran Gulliver; Taylor Lawrence; Greg Cackett; Great Britain	1:49.25 (54.76 / 54.49)	Johannes Lochner; Florian Bauer; Erec Bruckert; Christian Rasp; Germany	1:49.27 (54.71 / 54.56)
(Germany) Altenberg 1	Brad Hall; Arran Gulliver; Taylor Lawrence; Greg Cackett; Great Britain	1:48.22 (54.17 / 54.05)	Christoph Hafer; Kevin Korona; Matthias Sommer; Tobias Schneider; Germany	1:48.31 (54.24 / 54.07)	Johannes Lochner; Erec Bruckert; Georg Fleischhauer; Christian Rasp; Germany	1:48.48 (54.29 / 54.19)
(Germany) Altenberg 2	Brad Hall; Arran Gulliver; Taylor Lawrence; Greg Cackett; Great Britain	1:49.32 (54.56 / 54.76)	Francesco Friedrich; Thorsten Margis; Candy Bauer; Felix Straub; Germany	1:49.41 (54.58 / 54.83)	Michael Vogt; Cyril Bieri; Alain Knuser; Sandro Michel; Switzerland	1:49.54 (54.66 / 54.88)
(Austria) Innsbruck 1	Francesco Friedrich; Thorsten Margis; Candy Bauer; Alexander Schüller; Germany	1:40.65 (50.28 / 50.37)	Brad Hall; Arran Gulliver; Taylor Lawrence; Greg Cackett; Great Britain	1:40.84 (50.43 / 50.41)	Johannes Lochner; Florian Bauer; Erec Bruckert; Joshua Tasche; Germany	1:40.99 (50.51 / 50.48)
(Austria) Innsbruck 2	Francesco Friedrich; Thorsten Margis; Candy Bauer; Alexander Schüller; Germany	1:40.17 (50.07 / 50.10)	Brad Hall; Arran Gulliver; Taylor Lawrence; Greg Cackett; Great Britain	1:40.36 (50.14 / 50.22)	Johannes Lochner; Florian Bauer; Erec Bruckert; Christian Rasp; Germany	1:40.54 (50.17 / 50.37)

=== Monobob ===
Event:	Gold:	Time	Silver:	Time	Bronze:	Time
(Canada) Whistler	Bianca Ribi; Canada	1:50.89 (55.41 / 55.48)	Cynthia Appiah; Canada	1:51.16 (55.85 / 55.31)	Kaillie Humphries; United States	1:51.18 (55.97 / 55.21)
(United States) Park City	Kaillie Humphries; United States	1:42.93 (51.66 / 51.27)	Lisa Buckwitz; Germany	1:43.24 (51.70 / 51.54)	Cynthia Appiah; Canada	1:43.26 (51.81 / 51.45)
(United States) Lake Placid	Laura Nolte; Germany	2:01.31 (1:00.47 / 1:00.84)	Kaillie Humphries; United States	2:01.42 (1:00.63 / 1:00.79)	Lisa Buckwitz; Germany	2:01.92 (1:00.87 / 1:01.05)
(Germany) Winterberg	Laura Nolte; Germany	1:59.54 (59.82 / 59.72)	Kaillie Humphries; United States	1:59.72 (59.81 / 59.91)	Kim Kalicki; Germany	1:59.73 (59.91 / 59.82)
(Germany) Altenberg 1	Kaillie Humphries; United States	1:57.92 (58.95 / 58.97)	Laura Nolte; Germany	1:58.47 (58.80 / 59.67)	Cynthia Appiah; Canada	1:58.86 (59.31 / 59.55)
(Germany) Altenberg 2	Kaillie Humphries; United States	2:00.61 (1:00.33 / 1:00.28)	Laura Nolte; Germany	2:01.13 (1:00.79 / 1:00.34)	Breeana Walker; Australia	2:01.89 (1:00.91 / 1:00.97)
(Austria) Innsbruck	Lisa Buckwitz; Germany	1:49.20 (54.49 / 54.71)	Breeana Walker; Australia	1:49.38 (54.70 / 54.68)	Cynthia Appiah; Canada	1:49.42 (54.79 / 54.63)
(Latvia) Sigulda	Kaillie Humphries; United States	1:46.52 (52.78 / 53.74)	Kim Kalicki; Germany	1:46.96 (53.08 / 53.88)	Cynthia Appiah; Canada	1:47.10 (53.01 / 54.09)
(Latvia) Sigulda	Kaillie Humphries; United States	1:46.52 (52.78 / 53.74)	Kim Kalicki; Germany	1:46.96 (53.08 / 53.88)	Ying Qing; China	1:47.10 (52.98 / 54.12)

=== Two-woman ===
Event:	Gold:	Time	Silver:	Time	Bronze:	Time
(Canada) Whistler	Kim Kalicki; Anabel Galander; Germany	1:45.93 (52.96 / 52.97)	Melanie Hasler; Nadja Pasternack; Switzerland	1:46.13 (52.94 / 53.19)	Kaillie Humphries; Emily Renna; United States	1:46.34 (53.13 / 53.21)
(United States) Park City	Kim Kalicki; Leonie Fiebig; Germany	1:37.37 (48.60 / 48.77)	Laura Nolte; Lena Neunecker; Germany	1:37.60 (48.68 / 48.92)	Kaillie Humphries; Jasmine Jones; United States	1:37.69 (48.77 / 48.92)
(United States) Lake Placid	Kaillie Humphries; Kaysha Love; United States	1:54.93 (57.39 / 57.54)	Laura Nolte; Lena Neunecker; Germany	1:55.05 (57.44 / 57.61)	Kim Kalicki; Anabel Galander; Germany	1:55.52 (57.64 / 57.88)
(Germany) Winterberg	Laura Nolte; Neele Schuten; Germany	1:53.74 (56.88 / 56.86)	Lisa Buckwitz; Kira Lipperheide; Germany	1:54.09 (57.10 / 56.99)	Kim Kalicki; Leonie Fiebig; Germany	1:54.20 (57.13 / 57.07)
(Germany) Altenberg 1	Lisa Buckwitz; Kira Lipperheide; Germany	1:53.17 (56.41 / 56.76)	Kim Kalicki; Leonie Fiebig; Germany	1:53.29 (56.59 / 56.70)	Laura Nolte; Lena Neunecker; Germany	1:53.55 (56.66 / 56.89)
(Germany) Altenberg 1	Lisa Buckwitz; Kira Lipperheide; Germany	1:53.17 (56.41 / 56.76)	Kim Kalicki; Leonie Fiebig; Germany	1:53.29 (56.59 / 56.70)	Kaillie Humphries; Jasmine Jones; United States	1:53.55 (56.70 / 56.85)
(Germany) Altenberg 2	Kaillie Humphries; Kaysha Love; United States	1:54.79 (57.44 / 57.35)	Laura Nolte; Neele Schuten; Germany	1:54.81 (57.63 / 57.18)	Melanie Hasler; Nadja Pasternack; Switzerland	1:55.36 (57.79 / 57.57)
(Austria) Innsbruck	Laura Nolte; Neele Schuten; Germany	1:45.18 (52.77 / 52.41)	Kim Kalicki; Leonie Fiebig; Germany	1:45.19 (52.72 / 52.47)	Melanie Hasler; Nadja Pasternack; Switzerland	1:45.24 (52.73 / 52.51)
(Latvia) Sigulda	Laura Nolte; Neele Schuten; Germany	1:41.73 (50.80 / 50.93)	Kim Kalicki; Anabel Galander; Germany	1:41.87 (50.89 / 50.98)	Kaillie Humphries; Kaysha Love; United States	1:41.97 (50.89 / 51.08)

== Standings ==
=== Two-man ===
Pos.	Racer	(Canada) WHI	(United States) PAR	(United States) LAK	(Germany) WIN	(Germany) ALT 1	(Germany) ALT 2	(Latvia) SIG 1	(Latvia) SIG 2	Points
1	Johannes Lochner (GER)	3	4	1	1	1	1	1	1	1742
2	Francesco Friedrich (GER)	1	1	2	6	3	3	2	2	1656
3	Brad Hall (GBR)	2	2	5	3	2	4	5	4	1582
4	Michael Vogt (SUI)	4	3	3	2	–	2	6	3	1388
5	Markus Treichl (AUT)	7	8	6	9	5	13	13	7	1248
6	Christoph Hafer (GER)	5	5	4	4	4	5	–	–	1128
7	Emīls Cipulis (LAT)	–	–	–	7	6	7	4	8	864
8	Taylor Austin (CAN)	6	9	9	11	9	17	–	–	856
9	Cédric Follador (SUI)	9	12	11	–	–	12	11	10	824
10	Adam Dobeš (CZE)	–	11	–	16	19	18	10	12	728

=== Four-man ===
Pos.	Racer	(Canada) WHI	(United States) PAR	(United States) LAK	(Germany) WIN	(Germany) ALT 1	(Germany) ALT 2	(Austria) IGL 1	(Austria) IGL 2	Points
1	Francesco Friedrich (GER)	1	1	2	1	4	2	1	1	1737
2	Brad Hall (GBR)	2	4	1	2	1	1	2	2	1707
3	Johannes Lochner (GER)	6	2	4	3	3	4	3	3	1570
4	Markus Treichl (AUT)	5	6	8	6	5	5	5	5	1432
5	Michael Vogt (SUI)	4	5	10	5	–	3	8	6	1240
6	Christoph Hafer (GER)	DNF	3	3	4	2	6	6	–	1154
7	Cédric Follador (SUI)	7	8	5	7	–	9	11	10	1112
8	Taylor Austin (CAN)	3	9	6	9	8	13	–	–	960
9	Emīls Cipulis (LAT)	–	–	–	14	6	7	4	4	840
10	Adam Dobeš (CZE)	–	11	–	16	11	16	12	14	704

=== Monobob ===
Pos.	Racer	(Canada) WHI	(United States) PAR	(United States) LAK	(Germany) WIN	(Germany) ALT 1	(Germany) ALT 2	(Austria) IGL	(Latvia) SIG	Points
1	Kaillie Humphries (USA)	3	1	2	2	1	1	4	1	1712
2	Laura Nolte (GER)	7	4	1	1	2	2	5	6	1590
3	Cynthia Appiah (CAN)	2	3	9	8	3	5	3	3	1506
4	Kim Kalicki (GER)	5	6	5	3	7	7	8	2	1450
5	Melanie Hasler (SUI)	4	5	4	7	–	8	7	5	1248
6	Lisa Buckwitz (GER)	9	2	3	4	4	DNS	1	–	1171
7	Nicole Vogt (USA)	6	8	7	12	10	10	11	–	1056
8	Bianca Ribi (CAN)	1	7	6	9	9	14	–	–	985
9	Ying Qing (CHN)	–	–	–	10	6	4	5	3	896
10	Andreea Grecu (ROU)	–	–	–	6	8	6	10	7	824

=== Two-woman ===
Pos.	Racer	(Canada) WHI	(United States) PAR	(United States) LAK	(Germany) WIN	(Germany) ALT 1	(Germany) ALT 2	(Austria) IGL	(Latvia) SIG	Points
1	Laura Nolte (GER)	4	2	2	1	3	2	1	1	1697
2	Kim Kalicki (GER)	1	1	3	3	2	4	2	2	1672
3	Kaillie Humphries (USA)	3	3	1	4	3	1	4	3	1634
4	Melanie Hasler (SUI)	2	6	6	7	–	3	3	5	1314
5	Cynthia Appiah (CAN)	6	7	7	9	DSQ	6	9	6	1160
6	Lisa Buckwitz (GER)	–	4	5	2	1	DNS	5	–	995
7	Bianca Ribi (CAN)	5	5	4	12	7	12	–	–	984
8	Nicole Vogt (USA)	7	8	8	13	–	11	10	–	888
9	Andreea Grecu (ROU)	–	–	–	6	5	5	6	8	880
10	Ying Qing (CHN)	–	–	–	11	6	6	7	4	848

== Medal table ==
Rank	Nation	Gold	Silver	Bronze	Total
1	Germany	22	18	15	55
2	United States	6	2	5	13
3	Great Britain	3	7	1	11
4	Canada	1	1	5	7
5	Switzerland	0	3	6	9
6	Australia	0	1	1	2
7	China	0	0	1	1
Totals (7 entries)		32	32	34	98

== Points ==
Place	1	2	3	4	5	6	7	8	9	10	11	12	13	14	15	16	17	18	19	20
2-Man, 4-Man; Monobob, 2-Woman	225	210	200	192	184	176	168	160	152	144	136	128	120	112	104	96	88	80	74	68
