= 2024–25 Bobsleigh World Cup =

Bobsleigh championship season

Discipline	Men	Women
Combined	(Germany) Johannes Lochner (1)	(Germany) Laura Nolte (2)
Monobob	—	(Germany) Lisa Buckwitz (2)
Two	(Germany) Johannes Lochner (2)	(Germany) Laura Nolte (3)
Four	(Germany) Francesco Friedrich (7)	—

Competition
Edition	41st	32nd
Locations	6	6
Cancelled	–	1
Rescheduled	–	1

The 2024–25 Bobsleigh World Cup (official: BMW IBSF Bobsleigh World Cup) was a multi-race series over a season of bobsleigh, organised by International Bobsleigh and Skeleton Federation (IBSF).

The season started on 7 December 2024 in Altenberg, Germany and concluded on 16 February 2025 in Lillehammer, Norway.

The highlight of the season were the World Championships in Lake Placid, United States, whose results were not included in the World Cup standings.

== Map of world cup hosts ==
(Germany) Altenberg	(Latvia) Sigulda	(Germany) Winterberg
(Switzerland) St. Moritz	(Austria) Innsbruck-Igls	(Norway) Lillehammer
Europe Location of all 6 World Cup hosts of the season

== Schedule ==
No	Location	Date	Two-Man	Four-Man	Monobob	Two-Woman	Details
1	(Germany) Altenberg	7–8 December 2024	●	●	●	●	
2	(Latvia) Sigulda	14–15 December 2024	●●		●	●	
3	(Germany) Winterberg	4–5 January 2025	●	●	●	●	
4	(Switzerland) St. Moritz	11–12 January 2025	●	●		●	
5	(Austria) Innsbruck-Igls	18–19 January 2025	●	●	●	●	
6	(Switzerland) St. Moritz	24–26 January 2025		●	●●		
7	(Norway) Lillehammer	8–9 February 2025	●	●	●	●	also European Championships
8	(Norway) Lillehammer	15–16 February 2025	●	●	●	●	
WCH	(United States) Lake Placid	8–15 March 2025	●	●	●	●	World Championships (not included in the World Cup)

== Men's calendar & standings ==
=== Two-man ===
No.	Date	Place	Winner	Time	Second	Time	Third	Time	R.
1	7 Dec 2024	(Germany) Altenberg	Germany (Note: Due to an anti-doping rule violation of his pusher Simon Wulff, the bob of Francesco Friedrich lost his first place. All other teams moved up one position.); Johannes Lochner; Georg Fleischhauer	1:49.08 (54.63 / 54.45)	Germany; Adam Ammour; Issam Ammour	1:49.48 (54.83 / 54.65)	Great Britain; Brad Hall; Taylor Lawrence	1:49.84 (54.98 / 54.86)	
2	14 Dec 2024	(Latvia) Sigulda	Germany; Francesco Friedrich; Simon Wulff	1:38.68 (49.13 / 49.55)	Germany; Johannes Lochner; Georg Fleischhauer	1:39.03 (49.43 / 49.60)	Austria; Markus Treichl; Sascha Stepan	1:39.59 (49.60 / 49.99)	
3	15 Dec 2024	(Latvia) Sigulda	Germany; Johannes Lochner; Jörn Wenzel	1:39.24 (49.67 / 49.57)	Great Britain; Brad Hall; Taylor Lawrence / Gregg Cackett	1:39.45 (49.72 / 49.73)	Germany; Francesco Friedrich; Alexander Schüller	1:39.54 (49.75 / 49.79)	
4	4 Jan 2025	(Germany) Winterberg	Germany; Francesco Friedrich; Alexander Schüller	1:48.26 (54.05 / 54.21)	Germany; Adam Ammour; Benedikt Hertel	1:48.26 (54.05 / 54.21)	Germany; Johannes Lochner; Joshua Tasche	1:48.26 (54.05 / 54.21)	
5	11 Jan 2025	(Switzerland) St. Moritz	Germany; Johannes Lochner; Georg Fleischhauer Germany; Francesco Friedrich; Alexander Schüller	2:12.21 (1:06.36 / 1:05.85) 2:12.21 (1:06.41 / 1:05.80)	N/A		Germany; Adam Ammour; Benedikt Hertel	2:12.28 (1:06.40 / 1:05.88)	
6	18 Jan 2025	(Austria) Innsbruck-Igls	Germany; Johannes Lochner; Georg Fleischhauer	1:41.47 (50.75 / 50.72)	Germany; Francesco Friedrich; Alexander Schüller	1:41.63 (50.80 / 50.83)	Germany; Adam Ammour; Nick Stadelmann	1:41.84 (50.94 / 50.90)	
7	8 Feb 2025	(Norway) Lillehammer	Germany; Francesco Friedrich; Alexander Schüller	1:41.15 (50.50 / 50.65)	Germany; Johannes Lochner; Georg Fleischhauer	1:41.29 (50.57 / 50.72)	Great Britain; Brad Hall; Taylor Lawrence	1:41.63 (50.76 / 50.87)	
8	15 Feb 2025	(Norway) Lillehammer	Germany; Johannes Lochner; Georg Fleischhauer	1:40.99 (50.45 / 50.54)	Germany; Francesco Friedrich; Felix Straub	1:41.01 (50.46 / 50.55)	Germany; Adam Ammour; Nick Stadelmann	1:41.19 (50.54 / 50.65)	
Overall			Germany; Johannes Lochner		Great Britain; Brad Hall		Germany; Francesco Friedrich		

==== Overall leaders ====
Holder	Date	Place(s)	Number of competitions
(Germany) Francesco Friedrich	7 December 2024 – 15 February 2025	(Germany) Altenberg – (Norway) Lillehammer	8
(Germany) Johannes Lochner	16 October 2025	IBSF-ADR	

==== Standings ====
Rank	Racer	Points	(Germany) ALT	(Latvia) SIG1	(Latvia) SIG2	(Germany) WIN	(Switzerland) STM1	(Austria) IGL	(Norway) LIL1	(Norway) LIL2
1	(Germany) Johannes Lochner	1745	1	2	1	3	1	1	2	1
2	(United Kingdom) Brad Hall	1538	3	4	2	4	6	5	3	5
3	(Germany) Francesco Friedrich	1520	dsq	1	3	1	1	2	1	2
4	(Germany) Adam Ammour	1300	2	17	–	2	3	3	4	3
5	(Italy) Patrick Baumgartner	1288	5	8	7	6	10	9	9	9
6	(Switzerland) Timo Rohner	1216	9	9	11	7	7	15	7	7
7	(Switzerland) Cédric Follador	1160	8	7	8	14	9	17	10	6
8	(South Korea) Kim Jin-su	1136	4	–	10	5	12	7	8	8
9	(Latvia) Jēkabs Kalenda	1136	6	5	12	13	14	6	16	10
10	(United States) Frank Del Duca	1112	13	11	5	10	8	4	6	–

=== Four-man ===
No.	Date	Place	Winner	Time	Second	Time	Third	Time	R.
1	8 Dec 2024	(Germany) Altenberg	Germany; Francesco Friedrich; Matthias Sommer; Alexander Schüller; Felix Straub	54.17	Austria; Markus Treichl; Markus Sammer; Sascha Stepan; Kristian Huber Germany; Johannes Lochner; Georg Fleischhauer; Erec Bruckert; Joshua Tasche	54.34	N/A		
2	5 Jan 2025	(Germany) Winterberg	Great Britain; Brad Hall; Taylor Lawrence; Arran Gulliver; Greg Cackett	1:48.07 (53.82 / 54.25)	Germany; Francesco Friedrich; Simon Wulff; Matthias Sommer; Felix Straub	1:48.26 (53.95 / 54.31)	Germany; Adam Ammour; Theo Hempel; Benedikt Hertel; Rupert Schenk	1:48.55 (53.99 / 54.56)	
3	12 Jan 2025	(Switzerland) St. Moritz	Germany; Francesco Friedrich; Matthias Sommer; Alexander Schüller; Felix Straub	2:09.13 (1:04.82 / 1:04.31)	Germany; Johannes Lochner; Georg Fleischhauer; Erec Bruckert; Florian Bauer	2:09.36 (1:04.81 / 1:04.55)	Great Britain; Brad Hall; Taylor Lawrence; Leon Greenwood; Greg Cackett	2:09.43 (1:04.81 / 1:04.62)	
4	19 Jan 2025	(Austria) Innsbruck-Igls	Germany; Francesco Friedrich; Matthias Sommer; Alexander Schüller; Felix Straub	1:40.45 (50.21 / 50.24)	Great Britain; Brad Hall; Taylor Lawrence; Leon Greenwood; Arran Gulliver	1:40.73 (50.37 / 50.36)	Germany; Johannes Lochner; Georg Fleischhauer; Joshua Tasche; Florian Bauer	1:40.74 (50.23 / 50.51)	
5	25 Jan 2025	(Switzerland) St. Moritz	Great Britain; Brad Hall; Taylor Lawrence; Arran Gulliver; Leon Greenwood	2:11.59 (1:05.40 / 1:06.19)	Germany; Francesco Friedrich; Matthias Sommer; Alexander Schüller; Felix Straub	2:11.80 (1:05.53 / 1:06.27)	Germany; Johannes Lochner; Florian Bauer; Erec Bruckert; Georg Fleischhauer	2:11.87 (1:05.71 / 1:06.16)	
~~6~~	26 Jan 2025	(Switzerland) St. Moritz	Cancelled due to weather conditions						
7	9 Feb 2025	(Norway) Lillehammer	Germany; Johannes Lochner; Florian Bauer; Jörn Wenzel; Georg Fleischhauer	1:39.85 (50.05 / 49.80)	Germany; Francesco Friedrich; Matthias Sommer; Alexander Schüller; Felix Straub	1:39.90 (49.95 / 49.95)	Switzerland; Michael Vogt; Gregory Jones; Andreas Haas; Amadou David Ndiaye Great Britain; Brad Hall; Taylor Lawrence; Arran Gulliver; Leon Greenwood	1:40.05	
8	16 Feb 2025	(Norway) Lillehammer	Germany; Johannes Lochner; Florian Bauer; Erec Bruckert; Georg Fleischhauer	1:39.03 (49.48 / 49.55)	Germany; Francesco Friedrich; Matthias Sommer; Alexander Schüller; Felix Straub	1:39.35 (49.57 / 49.78)	Great Britain; Brad Hall; Arran Gulliver; Taylor Lawrence; Leon Greenwood	1:39.39 (49.63 / 49.76)	
Overall			Germany; Francesco Friedrich		Germany; Johannes Lochner		Great Britain; Brad Hall		

==== Overall leaders ====
Holder	Date	Place(s)	Number of competitions
(Germany) Francesco Friedrich	8 December 2024 – 16 February 2025	(Germany) Altenberg – (Norway) Lillehammer	7

==== Standings ====
Rank	Racer	Points	(Germany) ALT	(Germany) WIN	(Switzerland) STM1	(Austria) IGL	(Switzerland) STM2	(Norway) LIL1	(Norway) LIL2
1	(Germany) Francesco Friedrich	1515	1	2	1	1	2	2	2
2	(Germany) Johannes Lochner	1446	2	6	2	3	3	1	1
3	(United Kingdom) Brad Hall	1444	5	1	3	2	1	3	3
4	(Germany) Adam Ammour	1312	4	3	5	4	4	5	7
5	(Italy) Patrick Baumgartner	1184	9	4	10	5	6	6	8
6	(Switzerland) Cédric Follador	1112	7	8	9	11	4	9	9
7	(Switzerland) Timo Rohner	1088	8	9	6	16	7	8	6
7	(Switzerland) Michael Vogt	1088	–	5	4	7	8	3	5
9	(Latvia) Jēkabs Kalenda	1034	6	11	8	7	12	13	10
10	(United States) Frank Del Duca	768	13	12	16	10	11	10	–

=== Men's combined standings ===
Rank	after all of 15 events	Points
1	(Germany) Johannes Lochner	3191
2	(Germany) Francesco Friedrich	3035
3	(United Kingdom) Brad Hall	2982
4	(Germany) Adam Ammour	2612
5	(Italy) Patrick Baumgartner	2472
6	(Switzerland) Timo Rohner	2304
7	(Switzerland) Cédric Follador	2272
8	(Latvia) Jēkabs Kalenda	2168
9	(South Korea) Kim Jin-su	1982
10	(Switzerland) Michael Vogt	1960

== Women's calendar & standings ==
=== Monobob ===
No.	Date	Place	Winner	Time	Second	Time	Third	Time	R.
1	7 Dec 2024	(Germany) Altenberg	(Germany) Laura Nolte	1:59.94 (59.56 / 1:00.38)	(Germany) Lisa Buckwitz	1:59.96 (59.59 / 1:00.37)	(Romania) Andreea Grecu	2:00.42 (59.60 / 1:00.82)	
2	14 Dec 2024	(Latvia) Sigulda	(Germany) Lisa Buckwitz	1:46.89 (53.33 / 53.56)	(Germany) Laura Nolte	1:46.98 (53.31 / 53.67)	(Australia) Breeana Walker	1:47.15 (53.32 / 53.83)	
3	4 Jan 2025	(Germany) Winterberg	(Germany) Lisa Buckwitz	1:56.83 (58.58 / 58.25)	(Switzerland) Melanie Hasler	1:56.92 (58.61 / 58.31)	(Australia) Breeana Walker	1:57.11 (58.67 / 58.44)	
~~4~~	11 Jan 2025	(Switzerland) St. Moritz	rescheduled for 24 January due to warm weather conditions						
5	18 Jan 2025	(Austria) Innsbruck-Igls	(Germany) Lisa Buckwitz	1:48.41 (54.14 / 54.27)	(United States) Kaysha Love	1:48.45 (54.21 / 54.24)	(Germany) Laura Nolte	1:48.51 (54.28 / 54.23)	
4	24 Jan 2025	(Switzerland) St. Moritz	(United States) Elana Meyers Taylor	2:21.52 (1:11.20 / 1:10.32)	(Australia) Breeana Walker	2:21.76 (1:11.28 / 1:10.48)	(United States) Kaysha Love	2:22.07 (1:11.47 / 1:10.60)	
6	25 Jan 2025	(Switzerland) St. Moritz	(United States) Elana Meyers Taylor	2:22.15 (1:11.08 / 1:11.07)	(United States) Kaysha Love	2:22.29 (1:11.22 / 1:11.07)	(Germany) Laura Nolte	2:22.45 (1:11.21 / 1:11.24)	
7	8 Feb 2025	(Norway) Lillehammer	(Australia) Breeana Walker (United States) Kaysha Love	1:49.14 (54.56 / 54.58) 1:49.14 (54.62 / 54.52)	N/A		(Germany) Laura Nolte	1:49.21 (54.55 / 54.66)	
8	15 Feb 2025	(Norway) Lillehammer	(Australia) Breeana Walker	1:48.51 (54.01 / 54.50)	(Canada) Cynthia Appiah	1:48.66 (54.10 / 54.56)	(Germany) Lisa Buckwitz	1:48.67 (54.16 / 54.51)	
Overall			(Germany) Lisa Buckwitz		(Australia) Breeana Walker		(Germany) Laura Nolte		

==== Overall leaders ====
Holder	Date	Place(s)	Number of competitions
(Germany) Laura Nolte	7 December 2024	(Germany) Altenberg	1
(Germany) Lisa Buckwitz	14 December 2024 – 15 February 2025	(Latvia) Sigulda – (Norway) Lillehammer	7

==== Standings ====
Rank	Racer	Points	(Germany) ALT	(Latvia) SIG	(Germany) WIN	(Austria) IGL	(Switzerland) STM1	(Switzerland) STM2	(Norway) LIL1	(Norway) LIL2
1	(Germany) Lisa Buckwitz	1637	2	1	1	1	4	6	5	3
2	(Australia) Breeana Walker	1596	5	3	3	4	2	8	1	1
3	(Germany) Laura Nolte	1555	1	2	5	3	9	3	3	5
4	(Germany) Kim Kalicki	1336	4	4	8	8	6	5	10	12
5	(United States) Kaysha Love	1317	9	6	10	2	3	2	1	–
6	(Switzerland) Melanie Hasler	1218	14	7	2	5	8	DNF	4	4
7	(Canada) Cynthia Appiah	1202	8	12	11	10	10	15	6	2
8	(United States) Elana Meyers Taylor	1190	20	8	7	6	1	1	7	–
9	(Romania) Andreea Grecu	1168	3	5	6	7	22	16	12	8
10	(Austria) Katrin Beierl	1120	12	14	9	9	12	9	13	6

=== Two-woman ===
No.	Date	Place	Winner	Time	Second	Time	Third	Time	R.
1	8 Dec 2024	(Germany) Altenberg	Germany; Laura Nolte; Deborah Levi	1:52.14 (55.99 / 56.15)	Germany; Lisa Buckwitz; Neele Schuten	1:52.79 (56.18 / 56.61)	Germany; Kim Kalicki; Lauryn Siebert	1:52.83 (56.40 / 56.43)	
2	15 Dec 2024	(Latvia) Sigulda	Germany; Laura Nolte; Leonie Kluwig	1:48.59 (55.03 / 53.56)	Germany; Kim Kalicki; Neele Schuten	1:48.70 (55.44 / 53.26)	United States; Kaysha Love; Jasmine Jones	1:49.22 (55.26 / 53.96)	
3	5 Jan 2025	(Germany) Winterberg	Germany; Lisa Buckwitz; Kira Lipperheide	1:54.01 (57.25 / 56.76)	Germany; Laura Nolte; Deborah Levi	1:54.02 (56.94 / 57.08)	Germany; Kim Kalicki; Leonie Fiebig	1:54.21 (57.42 / 56.79)	
4	12 Jan 2025	(Switzerland) St. Moritz	Germany; Kim Kalicki; Leonie Fiebig	2:16.85 (1:08.98 / 1:07.87)	Germany; Laura Nolte; Deborah Levi	2:16.90 (1:09.18 / 1:07.72)	Germany; Lisa Buckwitz; Neele Schuten	2:17.27 (1:09.19 / 1:08.08)	
5	19 Jan 2025	(Austria) Innsbruck-Igls	Germany; Laura Nolte; Deborah Levi	1:44.09 (52.05 / 52.04)	Germany; Kim Kalicki; Leonie Fiebig	1:44.24 (52.09 / 52.15)	Germany; Lisa Buckwitz; Neele Schuten	1:44.44 (52.24 / 52.20)	
~~6~~	26 Jan 2025	(Switzerland) St. Moritz	Cancelled due to weather conditions						
7	9 Feb 2025	(Norway) Lillehammer	Germany; Laura Nolte; Leonie Kluwig	1:44.40 (52.11 / 52.29)	Germany; Kim Kalicki; Leonie Fiebig	1:44.42 (52.19 / 52.23)	Germany; Lisa Buckwitz; Kira Lipperheide	1:44.70 (52.34 / 52.36)	
8	16 Feb 2025	(Norway) Lillehammer	Germany; Laura Nolte; Leonie Kluwig	1:43.74 (51.73 / 52.01)	Germany; Lisa Buckwitz; Neele Schuten	1:43.94 (51.75 / 52.19)	Canada; Melissa Lotholz; Skylar Sieben	1:44.70 (52.08 / 52.62)	
Overall			Germany; Laura Nolte		Germany; Kim Kalicki		Germany; Lisa Buckwitz		

==== Overall leaders ====
Holder	Date	Place(s)	Number of competitions
(Germany) Laura Nolte	8 December 2024 – 16 February 2025	(Germany) Altenberg – (Norway) Lillehammer	7

==== Standings ====
Rank	Racer	Points	(Germany) ALT	(Latvia) SIG	(Germany) WIN	(Switzerland) STM1	(Austria) IGL	(Norway) LIL1	(Norway) LIL2
1	(Germany) Laura Nolte	1545	1	1	2	2	1	1	1
2	(Germany) Kim Kalicki	1447	3	2	3	1	2	2	4
3	(Germany) Lisa Buckwitz	1437	2	4	1	3	3	3	2
4	(Switzerland) Melanie Hasler	1248	4	7	6	6	5	6	6
5	(Austria) Katrin Beierl	1160	12	5	8	10	8	4	4
6	(United States) Elana Meyers Taylor	992	6	11	12	4	4	7	–
6	(United States) Kaillie Humphries	992	5	10	4	5	10	10	–
8	(Canada) Melissa Lotholz	924	7	12	14	20	17	8	3
9	(United States) Kaysha Love	920	9	3	15	12	5	9	–
10	(Romania) Andreea Grecu	898	8	8	16	19	12	12	9

=== Women's combined standings ===
Rank	after all of 15 events	Points
1	(Germany) Laura Nolte	3100
2	(Germany) Lisa Buckwitz	3074
3	(Germany) Kim Kalicki	2783
4	(Switzerland) Melanie Hasler	2466
5	(Austria) Katrin Beierl	2280
6	(United States) Kaysha Love	2237
7	(United States) Elana Meyers Taylor	2182
8	(Australia) Breeana Walker	2138
9	(Romania) Andreea Grecu	2066
10	(United States) Kaillie Humphries	2032

== Podium table by nation ==
Table showing the World Cup podium places (gold–1st place, silver–2nd place, bronze–3rd place) by the countries represented by the athletes.

Rank	Nation	Gold	Silver	Bronze	Total
1	Germany	25	21	17	63
2	United States	3	2	2	7
3	Great Britain	2	2	5	9
4	Australia	2	1	2	5
5	Austria	0	1	1	2
5	Canada	0	1	1	2
5	Switzerland	0	1	1	2
8	Romania	0	0	1	1
Totals (8 entries)		32	29	30	91

== Points distribution ==
The table shows the number of points won in the 2024–25 Bobsleigh World Cup for men and women.

Place	1	2	3	4	5	6	7	8	9	10	11	12	13	14	15	16	17	18	19	20
2-Man, 4-Man, Monobob, 2-Woman	225	210	200	192	184	176	168	160	152	144	136	128	120	112	104	96	88	80	74	68
