= 2023–24 Bobsleigh World Cup =

Bobsleigh championship season

Discipline	Men	Women
Combined	(Germany) Francesco Friedrich (7)	(Germany) Laura Nolte (1)
Monobob	—	(Germany) Lisa Buckwitz (1)
Two	(Germany) Francesco Friedrich (6)	(Germany) Laura Nolte (2)
Four	(Germany) Francesco Friedrich (6)	—

Competition
Edition	40th	31st
Locations	8	7

The 2023–24 Bobsleigh World Cup (official: BMW IBSF Bobsleigh World Cup) was a multi-race series over a season of bobsleigh, organised by International Bobsleigh and Skeleton Federation (IBSF).

The season started on 17 November 2023 in Yanqing, China and ended on 23 March 2024 in Lake Placid, United States.

The highlight of the season was the World Championships in Winterberg, Germany, whose results were not included in the World Cup standings.

== Map of world cup hosts ==
All 8 locations hosting world cup events in this season (including Winterberg – venue of the World Championships).

Europe
North America	Asia

== Schedule ==
#	Location	Date	Two-Man	Four-Man	Monobob	Two-Woman	Details
1	(China) Yanqing	17–19 November 2023	●	●●			
2	(France) La Plagne	9–10 December 2023	●	●	●	●	
3	(Austria) Innsbruck-Igls	16–17 December 2023	●	●	●●	●	also European Championships for four-man
4	(Switzerland) St. Moritz	13–14 January 2024	●	●	●	●	
5	(Norway) Lillehammer	27–28 January 2024	●	●	●	●	
6	(Latvia) Sigulda	2–4 February 2024	●		●	●●	also European Championships for Monobob, two-woman and two-man (extra run)
7	(Germany) Altenberg	17–18 February 2024	●	●	●	●	
WCH	(Germany) Winterberg	24 February–3 March 2024	●	●	●	●	World Championships (not included in the World Cup)
8	(United States) Lake Placid	22–23 March 2024	●	●	●	●	

== Calendar & Standings ==
=== Two-man ===
#	Date	Place	Winner	Time	Second	Time	Third	Time	R.
1	17 November 2023	(China) Yanqing	Germany; Johannes Lochner; Georg Fleischhauer	1:58.64 (59.18 / 59.46)	Germany; Francesco Friedrich; Alexander Schüller	1:59.26 (59.50 / 59.76)	Switzerland; Michael Vogt; Sandro Michel	1:59.54 (59.63 / 59.91)	
2	9 December 2023	(France) La Plagne	Switzerland; Michael Vogt; Sandro Michel	1:58.51 (59.26 / 59.25)	Germany; Johannes Lochner; Georg Fleischhauer	1:58.58 (59.23 / 59.35)	Germany; Francesco Friedrich; Thorsten Margis	1:58.94 (59.49 / 59.45)	
3	16 December 2023	(Austria) Innsbruck-Igls	Germany; Johannes Lochner; Georg Fleischhauer	1:41.94 (50.88 / 51.06)	Germany; Francesco Friedrich; Alexander Schüller	1:42.02 (51.02 / 51.00)	Germany; Adam Ammour; Issam Ammour	1:42.68 (51.31 / 51.37)	
4	13 January 2024	(Switzerland) St. Moritz	Germany; Johannes Lochner; Georg Fleischhauer	2:10.74 (1:05.53 / 1:05.21)	Germany; Francesco Friedrich; Alexander Schüller	2:10.99 (1:05.65 / 1:05.34)	Switzerland; Michael Vogt; Sandro Michel	2:11.29 (1:05.86 / 1:05.43)	
5	27 January 2024	(Norway) Lillehammer	Germany; Johannes Lochner; Georg Fleischhauer	1:40.63 (50.34 / 50.29)	Germany; Francesco Friedrich; Alexander Schüller	1:41.01 (50.62 / 50.39)	Germany; Adam Ammour; Benedikt Hertel	1:41.08 (50.58 / 50.50)	
6	3 February 2024	(Latvia) Sigulda	Germany; Adam Ammour; Benedikt Hertel	1:39.33 (49.72 / 49.61)	Switzerland; Michael Vogt; Sandro Michel	1:39.45 (49.80 / 49.65)	Germany; Francesco Friedrich; Matthias Sommer	1:39.48 (49.87 / 49.61)	
7	17 February 2024	(Germany) Altenberg	Germany; Adam Ammour; Costa Laurenz	1:51.41 (55.71 / 55.70)	Germany; Francesco Friedrich; Thorsten Margis	1:51.59 (55.65 / 55.94)	South Korea; Kim Jin-su; Kim Hyeong-geun	1:52.02 (55.93 / 56.09)	
8	22 March 2024	(United States) Lake Placid	Germany; Francesco Friedrich; Alexander Schüller	1:49.70 (54.69 / 55.01)	Germany; Johannes Lochner; Joshua Tasche	1:49.95 (54.83 / 55.12)	Germany; Adam Ammour; Benedikt Hertel	1:50.60 (55.19 / 55.41)	

==== Overall leaders ====
No.	Holder	Date gained	Place	Date forfeited	Place	Number of competitions
1.	(Germany) Johannes Lochner	17 November 2023	(China) Yanqing	17 February 2024	(Germany) Altenberg	6
2.	(Germany) Francesco Friedrich	17 February 2024	(Germany) Altenberg			2

Rank	Racer	Points	(China) YAN	(France) LAP	(Austria) IGL	(Switzerland) STM	(Norway) LIL	(Latvia) SIG	(Germany) ALT	(United States) LAK
1	(Germany) Francesco Friedrich	1675	2	3	2	2	2	3	2	1
2	(Germany) Johannes Lochner	1512	1	2	1	1	1	4	–	2
3	(Germany) Adam Ammour	1410	–	5	3	6	3	1	1	3
4	(Switzerland) Michael Vogt	1403	3	1	5	3	4	2	–	4
5	(Latvia) Emīls Cipulis	1304	5	11	6	5	8	8	5	8
6	(Switzerland) Simon Friedli	1296	6	8	10	4	7	5	10	12
7	(Italy) Patrick Baumgartner	1280	4	7	9	8	10	6	9	11
8	(United States) Frank Del Duca	1192	–	4	4	13	5	8	8	5
9	(Austria) Markus Treichl	1184	7	10	7	14	12	10	7	9
10	(Switzerland) Cédric Follador	1152	9	6	12	7	17	11	4	14

=== Four-man ===
#	Date	Place	Winner	Time	Second	Time	Third	Time	R.
1	18 November 2023	(China) Yanqing	Germany; Johannes Lochner; Georg Fleischhauer; Erec Bruckert; Florian Bauer	1:57.04 (58.60 / 58.44)	Germany; Francesco Friedrich; Thorsten Margis; Alexander Schüller; Candy Bauer	1:57.31 (58.63 / 58.68)	China; Sun Kaizhi; Ding Song; Ye Jielong; Zhen Heng	1:57.44 (58.58 / 58.86)	
2	19 November 2023	(China) Yanqing	Germany; Johannes Lochner; Georg Fleischhauer; Joshua Tasche; Florian Bauer	1:56.61 (58.22 / 58.39)	Italy; Patrick Baumgartner; Eric Fantazzini; Robert Mircea; Lorenzo Bilotti	1:56.92 (58.35 / 58.57)	Germany; Francesco Friedrich; Thorsten Margis; Felix Straub; Candy Bauer	1:56.93 (58.25 / 58.68)	
3	10 December 2023	(France) La Plagne	Germany; Francesco Friedrich; Thorsten Margis; Alexander Schüller; Felix Straub	1:56.14 (58.12 / 58.02)	Germany; Johannes Lochner; Florian Bauer; Erec Bruckert; Georg Fleischhauer	1:56.58 (58.42 / 58.16)	Germany; Adam Ammour; Benedikt Hertel; Nick Stadelmann; Rupert Schenk	1:56.69 (58.38 / 58.31)	
4	17 December 2023	(Austria) Innsbruck-Igls	Germany; Francesco Friedrich; Candy Bauer; Alexander Schüller; Felix Straub	1:40.89 (50.43 / 50.46)	Germany; Johannes Lochner; Erec Bruckert; Joshua Tasche; Georg Fleischhauer	1:41.03 (50.52 / 50.51)	Latvia; Emīls Cipulis; Dāvis Spriņģis; Matīss Miknis; Krists Lindenblats	1:41.35 (50.60 / 50.75)	
5	14 January 2024	(Switzerland) St. Moritz	Germany; Johannes Lochner; Florian Bauer; Erec Bruckert; Georg Fleischhauer	2:08.89 (1:04.61 / 1:04.28)	Germany; Francesco Friedrich; Thorsten Margis; Candy Bauer; Alexander Schüller	2:08.99 (1:04.65 / 1:04.34)	Latvia; Emīls Cipulis; Dāvis Spriņģis; Lauris Kaufmanis; Krists Lindenblats	2:09.29 (1:04.74 / 1:04.55)	
6	28 January 2024	(Norway) Lillehammer	Germany; Francesco Friedrich; Thorsten Margis; Alexander Schüller; Felix Straub	1:39.50 (49.74 / 49.76)	Germany; Johannes Lochner; Florian Bauer; Erec Bruckert; Georg Fleischhauer	1:39.72 (49.84 / 49.88)	Great Britain; Brad Hall; Leon Greenwood; Taylor Lawrence; Greg Cackett	1:40.15 (50.04 / 50.11)	
7	18 February 2024	(Germany) Altenberg	Germany; Francesco Friedrich; Candy Bauer; Alexander Schüller; Felix Straub Latvia; Emīls Cipulis; Dāvis Spriņģis; Matīss Miknis; Krists Lindenblats	1:48.55 (54.20 / 54.35) 1:48.55 (54.24 / 54.31)	–		Switzerland; Simon Friedli; Pascal Moser; Luca Rolli; Dominik Schläpfer	1:49.08 (54.42 / 54.66)	
8	23 March 2024	(United States) Lake Placid	Germany; Francesco Friedrich; Thorsten Margis; Matthias Sommer; Felix Straub	54.75	Germany; Johannes Lochner; Florian Bauer; Joshua Tasche; Georg Fleischhauer	54.92	Germany; Adam Ammour; Nick Stadelmann; Erik Leypold; Rupert Schenk	55.03	

==== Overall leaders ====
No.	Holder	Date gained	Place	Date forfeited	Place	Number of competitions
1.	(Germany) Johannes Lochner	18 November 2023	(China) Yanqing	18 February 2024	(Germany) Altenberg	6
2.	(Germany) Francesco Friedrich	18 February 2024	(Germany) Altenberg			2

Rank	Racer	Points	(China) YAN1	(China) YAN2	(France) LAP	(Austria) IGL	(Switzerland) STM	(Norway) LIL	(Germany) ALT	(United States) LAK
1	(Germany) Francesco Friedrich	1745	2	3	1	1	2	1	1	1
2	(Latvia) Emīls Cipulis	1529	4	4	5	3	3	5	1	9
3	(Germany) Johannes Lochner	1515	1	1	2	2	1	2	–	2
4	(Switzerland) Simon Friedli	1392	10	11	7	5	5	4	3	5
5	(Italy) Patrick Baumgartner	1290	6	2	9	11	12	5	6	12
6	(Switzerland) Cédric Follador	1288	7	10	6	6	7	9	7	11
7	(Austria) Markus Treichl	1256	9	7	11	9	8	14	5	4
8	(Latvia) Jēkabs Kalenda	1112	11	9	10	12	11	11	8	13
9	(Germany) Adam Ammour	1096	–	–	3	4	9	8	4	3
10	(China) Kaizhi Sun	1056	3	6	13	6	13	10	13	–

=== Men's Combined Standings ===
Rank	after all 16 events	Points
1	(Germany) Francesco Friedrich	3420
2	(Germany) Johannes Lochner	3027
3	(Latvia) Emīls Cipulis	2873
4	(Switzerland) Simon Friedli	2688
5	(Italy) Patrick Baumgartner	2570
6	(Germany) Adam Ammour	2506
7	(Austria) Markus Treichl	2440
8	(Switzerland) Cédric Follador	2440
9	(Switzerland) Michael Vogt	2435
10	(Latvia) Jēkabs Kalenda	1976

=== Monobob ===
#	Date	Place	Winner	Time	Second	Time	Third	Time	R.
1	9 December 2023	(France) La Plagne	United States; Kaysha Love	2:07.92 (1:04.13 / 1:03.79)	Switzerland; Melanie Hasler	2:08.13 (1:04.18 / 1:03.95)	Romania; Andreea Grecu	2:08.21 (1:04.17 / 1:04.04)	
2	15 December 2023	(Austria) Innsbruck-Igls	Germany; Lisa Buckwitz	1:51.17 (55.83 / 55.34)	Australia; Breeana Walker	1:51.42 (55.99 / 55.43)	Germany; Laura Nolte	1:51.47 (55.98 / 55.49)	
3	16 December 2023	(Austria) Innsbruck-Igls	Germany; Lisa Buckwitz	1:49.42 (54.67 / 54.75)	United States; Kaysha Love	1:49.53 (54.85 / 54.68)	Australia; Breeana Walker	1:49.55 (54.77 / 54.78)	
4	13 January 2024	(Switzerland) St. Moritz	Germany; Lisa Buckwitz	2:22.78 (1:11.89 / 1:10.89)	Germany; Laura Nolte	2:22.91 (1:11.77 / 1:11.14)	Australia; Breeana Walker	2:22.93 (1:11.79 / 1:11.14)	
5	27 January 2024	(Norway) Lillehammer	United States; Kaysha Love	1:48.52 (54.12 / 54.40)	Australia; Breeana Walker	1:48.94 (54.41 / 54.53)	Germany; Lisa Buckwitz	1:48.95 (54.44 / 54.51)	
6	3 February 2024	(Latvia) Sigulda	Germany; Lisa Buckwitz	1:47.46 (53.57 / 53.89)	Romania; Andreea Grecu	1:47.73 (53.46 / 54.27)	Germany; Laura Nolte United States; Elana Meyers Taylor	1:47.87 (53.59 / 54.28) 1:47.87 (53.71 / 54.16)	
7	17 February 2024	(Germany) Altenberg	Germany; Laura Nolte	2:01.29 (1:00.71 / 1:00.58)	United States; Elana Meyers Taylor	2:01.52 (1:00.45 / 1:01.07)	Germany; Lisa Buckwitz	2:01.55 (1:00.79 / 1:00.76)	
8	22 March 2024	(United States) Lake Placid	Australia; Breeana Walker	1:58.67 (59.22 / 59.45)	United States; Elana Meyers Taylor	1:58.91 (59.25 / 59.66)	Canada; Cynthia Appiah	1:59.13 (59.26 / 59.87)	

==== Overall leaders ====
No.	Holder	Date gained	Place	Date forfeited	Place	Number of competitions
1.	(United States) Kaysha Love	9 December 2023	(France) La Plagne	13 January 2024	(Switzerland) St. Moritz	3
2.	(Germany) Lisa Buckwitz	13 January 2024	(Switzerland) St. Moritz			5

Rank	Racer	Points	(France) LAP	(Austria) IGL1	(Austria) IGL2	(Switzerland) STM	(Norway) LIL	(Latvia) SIG	(Germany) ALT	(United States) LAK
1	(Germany) Lisa Buckwitz	1644	7	1	1	1	3	1	3	6
2	(Australia) Breeana Walker	1549	5	2	3	3	2	9	7	1
3	(Germany) Laura Nolte	1547	5	3	8	2	6	3	1	4
4	(United States) Kaysha Love	1516	1	4	2	9	1	5	10	5
5	(United States) Elana Meyers Taylor	1508	4	5	6	4	10	3	2	2
6	(Romania) Andreea Grecu	1466	3	6	7	7	4	2	4	8
7	(Switzerland) Melanie Hasler	1362	2	7	4	5	9	7	13	7
8	(Canada) Cynthia Appiah	1200	9	8	5	11	5	DSQ	5	3
9	(China) Qing Ying	1040	11	13	10	8	7	8	9	–
10	(Canada) Bianca Ribi	1016	10	10	11	15	12	13	14	12

=== Two-woman ===
#	Date	Place	Winner	Time	Second	Time	Third	Time	R.
1	10 December 2023	(France) La Plagne	Germany; Laura Nolte; Neele Schuten	2:02.24 (1:01.29 / 1:00.95)	Germany; Kim Kalicki; Leonie Fiebig	2:02.36 (1:01.34 / 1:01.02)	United States; Elana Meyers Taylor; Emily Renna	2:02.46 (1:01.47 / 1:00.99)	
2	17 December 2023	(Austria) Innsbruck-Igls	Germany; Lisa Buckwitz; Vanessa Mark	1:45.20 (52.60 / 52.60)	Germany; Kim Kalicki; Leonie Fiebig	1:45.29 (52.68 / 52.61)	Germany; Laura Nolte; Neele Schuten	1:45.64 (52.91 / 52.73)	
3	14 January 2024	(Switzerland) St. Moritz	Germany; Laura Nolte; Neele Schuten	2:16.59 (1:08.59 / 1:08.00)	Germany; Lisa Buckwitz; Laurynn Siebert	2:16.67 (1:08.53 / 1:08.14)	Switzerland; Melanie Hasler; Mara Morell	2:16.97 (1:08.80 / 1:08.17)	
4	28 January 2024	(Norway) Lillehammer	Germany; Kim Kalicki; Leonie Fiebig	1:43.62 (51.68 / 51.94)	Germany; Laura Nolte; Neele Schuten	1:43.81 (51.83 / 51.98)	United States; Kaysha Love; Azaria Hill	1:43.85 (51.72 / 52.13)	
5	2 February 2024	(Latvia) Sigulda	Germany; Kim Kalicki; Leonie Fiebig	1:41.53 (50.87 / 50.66)	Germany; Laura Nolte; Claudia Schüßler	1:41.57 (50.75 / 50.82)	Germany; Lisa Buckwitz; Vanessa Mark	1:41.65 (50.94 / 50.71)	
6	4 February 2024	(Latvia) Sigulda	Germany; Laura Nolte; Neele Schuten	1:41.53 (50.77 / 50.76)	Germany; Kim Kalicki; Anabel Galander	1:41.82 (50.93 / 50.89)	Switzerland; Melanie Hasler; Mara Morell	1:42.06 (51.11 / 50.95)	
7	18 February 2024	(Germany) Altenberg	Germany; Laura Nolte; Deborah Levi	1:52.53 (56.08 / 56.45)	Germany; Kim Kalicki; Anabel Galander	1:53.17 (56.51 / 56.66)	Romania; Andreea Grecu; Teodora Andreea Vlad	1:54.16 (57.12 / 57.04)	
8	23 March 2024	(United States) Lake Placid	Germany; Kim Kalicki; Leonie Fiebig	1:53.39 (56.51 / 56.88)	Great Britain; Adele Nicoll; Kya Placide	1:54.20 (56.98 / 57.22)	Germany; Laura Nolte; Claudia Schüßler	1:54.24 (57.00 / 57.24)	

==== Overall leaders ====
No.	Holder	Date gained	Place	Date forfeited	Place	Number of competitions
1.	(Germany) Laura Nolte	10 December 2023	(France) La Plagne			8

Rank	Racer	Points	(France) LAP	(Austria) IGL	(Switzerland) STM	(Norway) LIL	(Latvia) SIG1	(Latvia) SIG2	(Germany) ALT	(United States) LAK
1	(Germany) Laura Nolte	1720	1	3	1	2	2	1	1	3
2	(Germany) Kim Kalicki	1683	2	2	7	1	1	2	2	1
3	(Germany) Lisa Buckwitz	1539	6	1	2	4	3	4	9	4
4	(Switzerland) Melanie Hasler	1488	5	5	3	7	4	3	6	5
5	(United States) Elana Meyers Taylor	1240	3	6	8	6	7	5	DNF	6
6	(Australia) Breeana Walker	1192	7	4	5	5	5	13	–	8
7	(Romania) Andreea Grecu	1184	9	11	12	13	11	6	3	11
8	(Canada) Cynthia Appiah	1120	13	12	15	9	7	10	8	10
9	(Austria) Katrin Beierl	1104	–	14	9	8	6	7	5	9
10	(China) Qing Ying	1072	11	10	9	10	10	8	4	–

=== Women's Combined Standings ===
Rank	after all 16 events	Points
1	(Germany) Laura Nolte	3267
2	(Germany) Lisa Buckwitz	3183
3	(Switzerland) Melanie Hasler	2850
4	(United States) Elana Meyers Taylor	2748
5	(Australia) Breeana Walker	2741
6	(Romania) Andreea Grecu	2650
7	(United States) Kaysha Love	2412
8	(Canada) Cynthia Appiah	2320
9	(China) Qing Ying	2112
10	(Germany) Kim Kalicki	1987

== Podium table by nation ==
Table showing the World Cup podium places (gold–1st place, silver–2nd place, bronze–3rd place) by the countries represented by the athletes.

Rank	Nation	Gold	Silver	Bronze	Total
1	Germany	28	21	15	64
2	United States	2	3	3	8
3	Switzerland	1	2	5	8
4	Australia	1	2	2	5
5	Latvia	1	0	2	3
6	Romania	0	1	2	3
7	Great Britain	0	1	1	2
8	Italy	0	1	0	1
9	Canada	0	0	1	1
9	China	0	0	1	1
9	South Korea	0	0	1	1
Totals (11 entries)		33	31	33	97

== Points distribution ==
Place	1	2	3	4	5	6	7	8	9	10	11	12	13	14	15	16	17	18	19	20
2-Man, 4-Man; Monobob, 2-Woman	225	210	200	192	184	176	168	160	152	144	136	128	120	112	104	96	88	80	74	68
