= Bobsleigh at the 2022 Winter Olympics – Four-man =

Bobsleigh four-man at the XXIV Olympic Winter Games
- Bobsleigh
- Venue: Xiaohaituo Bobsleigh and Luge Track; Beijing
- Date: 19, 20 February 2022
- Competitors: 112 from 17 nations
- Teams: 28
- Winning time: 3:54.30

Medalists
1st place, gold medalist(s)		Francesco Friedrich; Thorsten Margis; Candy Bauer; Alexander Schüller	Germany
2nd place, silver medalist(s)		Johannes Lochner; Florian Bauer; Christopher Weber; Christian Rasp	Germany
3rd place, bronze medalist(s)		Justin Kripps; Ryan Sommer; Cam Stones; Ben Coakwell	Canada

The four-man competition in bobsleigh at the 2022 Winter Olympics was held on 19 February (heats 1 and 2) and 20 February (heats 3 and 4), at the Xiaohaituo Bobsleigh and Luge Track in Yanqing District of Beijing. Francesco Friedrich, Thorsten Margis, Candy Bauer, and Alexander Schüller of Germany won the gold medal, and Friedrich thereby successfully defended his 2018 Olympic title. Germany-2 driven by Johannes Lochner won the silver medal, and Canada-1, driven by Justin Kripps, won the bronze.

There were two silver medals awarded in 2018. Nico Walther with Germany-2 retired from competitions, but Won Yun-jong with South Korea qualified for the Olympics. Friedrich is the 2021 World champion. Benjamin Maier and Austria is the silver medalist, and Lochner and Germany-2 are the bronze medalists. The 2021–22 Bobsleigh World Cup was completely dominated by Friedrich, who with his team won seven events out of eight races. The eighth event was won by Oskars Ķibermanis and Latvia. Friedrich won the World Cup, followed by Kripps with Canada and Rostislav Gaitiukevich with Russia.

== Qualification ==
There was a quota of 28 sleds available for the men's two-man event. Qualification was based on the world rankings of the 2021/2022 season between 15 October 2020 and 16 January 2022. Pilots must have competed in six different races on three different tracks and been ranked in at least five of those races. Additionally, the pilot must been ranked among the top 50 for the man's events or top 40 for the women's events.

For the men's races the IBSF ranking will be used. The top two nations in the rankings earned three sleds each. The next seven nations earned two sleds each, while the next eight earned one sled each. The IBSF announced final quotas on January 24, 2022.

=== Summary ===
Sleds qualified	Countries	Athletes total	Nation
3	2	24	Germany; Canada
2	7	56	ROC; United States; Switzerland; Austria; South Korea; China; Italy
1	8	32	Great Britain; Latvia; France; Czech Republic; Netherlands; Brazil; Romania; Jamaica
28	17	112	

== Results ==
Rank	Bib	Athletes	Country	Run 1	Rank	Run 2	Rank	Run 3	Rank	Run 4	Rank	Total	Behind
1st place, gold medalist(s)	4	Francesco Friedrich; Thorsten Margis; Arndt Bauer; Alexander Schüller	Germany	58.29	2	58.71	1	58.17	1	59.13	1	3:54.30	—
2nd place, silver medalist(s)	6	Johannes Lochner; Florian Bauer; Christopher Weber; Christian Rasp	Germany	58.13 TR	1	58.90	3	58.34	2	59.30	5	3:54.67	+0.37
3rd place, bronze medalist(s)	5	Justin Kripps; Ryan Sommer; Cam Stones; Ben Coakwell	Canada	58.38	3	59.00	5	58.44	5	59.27	3	3:55.09	+0.79
4	12	Christoph Hafer; Michael Salzer; Matthias Sommer; Tobias Schneider	Germany	58.60	5	58.95	4	58.35	3	59.25	2	3:55.15	+0.85
5	9	Oskars Ķibermanis; Dāvis Spriņģis; Matīss Miknis; Edgars Nemme	Latvia	58.70	7	58.86	2	58.41	4	59.30	5	3:55.27	+0.97
6	8	Brad Hall; Taylor Lawrence; Nick Gleeson; Greg Cackett	Great Britain	58.60	5	59.09	6	58.65	6	59.38	7	3:55.72	+1.42
7	7	Rostislav Gaitiukevich; Mikhail Mordasov; Pavel Travkin; Aleksei Laptev	ROC	58.54	4	59.24	8	58.81	7	59.56	14	3:56.15	+1.85
8	14	Maxim Andrianov; Alexey Zaitsev; Vladislav Zharovtsev; Dmitrii Lopin	ROC	58.82	9	59.30	9	59.03	9	59.40	8	3:56.55	+2.25
9	15	Christopher Spring; Cody Sorensen; Sam Giguère; Mike Evelyn	Canada	59.10	12	59.33	10	59.10	10	59.46	11	3:56.99	+2.69
10	13	Hunter Church; Joshua Williamson; Kristopher Horn; Charlie Volker	United States	58.91	11	59.70	19	58.96	8	59.49	13	3:57.06	+2.76
11	11	Michael Vogt; Luca Rolli; Cyril Bieri; Sandro Michel	Switzerland	59.23	13	59.22	7	59.18	12	59.44	9	3:57.07	+2.77
12	10	Benjamin Maier; Sascha Stepan; Markus Sammer; Kristian Huber	Austria	58.76	8	59.46	11	59.17	11	1:00.10	20	3:57.49	+3.19
13	2	Mihai Tentea; Raul Dobre; Ciprian Daroczi; Cristian Radu	Romania	58.87	10	59.55	13	59.30	14	59.93	18	3:57.65	+3.35
13	17	Frank Del Duca; Carlo Valdes; James Reed; Hakeem Abdul-Saboor	United States	59.26	14	59.56	15	59.39	17	59.44	9	3:57.65	+3.35
15	3	Patrick Baumgartner; Eric Fantazzini; Alex Verginer; Lorenzo Bilotti	Italy	59.36	17	59.72	20	59.34	15	59.28	4	3:57.70	+3.40
16	25	Sun Kaizhi; Wu Qingze; Wu Zhitao; Zhen Heng	China	59.38	18	59.65	18	59.47	19	59.47	12	3:57.97	+3.67
17	27	Li Chunjian; Ding Song; Ye Jielong; Shi Hao	China	59.31	16	59.55	13	59.46	18	59.66	17	3:57.98	+3.68
18	20	Won Yun-jong; Kim Jin-su; Jung Hyun-woo; Kim Dong-hyun	South Korea	59.45	19	59.60	16	59.38	16	59.59	15	3:58.02	+3.72
19	18	Romain Heinrich; Lionel Lefebvre; Dorian Hauterville; Jérôme Laporal	France	59.29	15	59.53	12	59.29	13	1:00.06	19	3:58.17	+3.87
20	1	Edson Bindilatti; Rafael Souza da Silva; Erick Vianna; Edson Martins	Brazil	59.49	20	59.60	16	59.78	23	59.61	16	3:58.48	+4.18
21	21	Dominik Dvořák; Jan Šindelář; Jakub Nosek; Dominik Záleský	Czech Republic	59.71	23	59.80	21	59.65	22	—N/a		2:59.16	—N/a
22	22	Markus Treichl; Markus Glueck; Sebastian Mitterer; Robert Eckschlager	Austria	59.53	21	1:00.07	24	59.59	21	—N/a		2:59.19	—N/a
23	16	Taylor Austin; Daniel Sunderland; Chris Patrician; Jacob Dearborn	Canada	59.67	22	59.81	22	59.79	24	—N/a		2:59.27	—N/a
24	19	Simon Friedli; Adrian Fassler; Fabio Badraun; Andreas Haas	Switzerland	59.71	23	1:00.01	23	59.57	20	—N/a		2:59.29	—N/a
25	24	Suk Young-jin; Kim Hyeong-geun; Kim Tae-yang; Shin Ye-chan	South Korea	59.74	25	1:00.31	26	59.91	25	—N/a		2:59.96	—N/a
26	23	Ivo de Bruin; Jelen Franjić; Janko Franjić; Dennis Veenker	Netherlands	59.85	26	1:00.07	24	1:00.08	27	—N/a		3:00.00	—N/a
27	28	Mattia Variola; Robert Mircea; Alex Pagnini; Delmas Obou	Italy	1:00.25	27	1:00.33	27	1:00.07	26	—N/a		3:00.65	—N/a
28	26	Shanwayne Stephens; Ashley Watson; Rolando Reid; Matthew Wekpe	Jamaica	1:00.80	28	1:01.39	28	1:01.23	28	—N/a		3:03.42	—N/a
