= Kim Kalicki =

German bobsledder (born 1997)

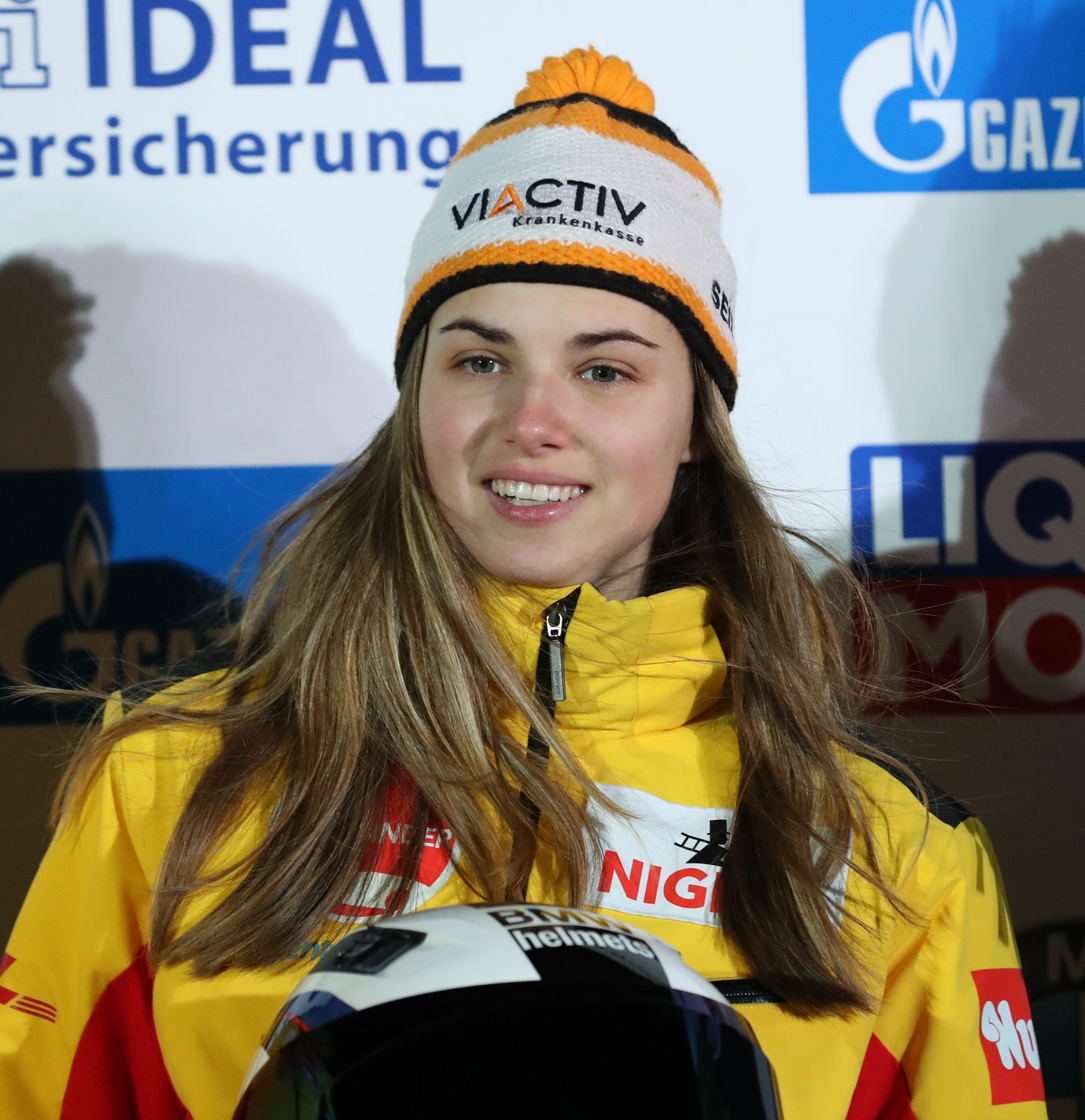
- Kalicki in 2020

Personal information
- Nationality: German
- Born: 27 June 1997 (age 29) Wiesbaden, Germany
- Height: 1.73 m (5 ft 8 in)
- Weight: 75 kg (165 lb)

Sport
- Country: Germany
- Sport: Bobsleigh
- Event: Two-women
- Club: TuS Eintracht Wiesbaden 1846
Medal record
Women's bobsleigh
Representing Germany
World Championships
Gold medal – first place	2023 St. Moritz	Two-woman
Silver medal – second place	2020 Alternberg	Two-women
Silver medal – second place	2021 Alternberg	Two-woman
Silver medal – second place	2025 Lake Placid	Two-woman
Bronze medal – third place	2024 Winterberg	Two-woman
European Championships
Gold medal – first place	2022 St. Moritz	Two-woman
Silver medal – second place	2021 Winterberg	Two-woman
Silver medal – second place	2024 Sigulda	Two-woman
Silver medal – second place	2025 Lillehammer	Two-woman
Bronze medal – third place	2023 Altenberg	Monobob
Bronze medal – third place	2023 Altenberg	Two-woman
Bronze medal – third place	2026 St. Moritz	Two-woman

Kim Kalicki (born 27 June 1997) is a German bobsledder who competes for TuS Eintracht Wiesbaden 1846. She also representing the Germany national team since 2015 and won the silver medal in the two-woman bobsleigh event at the Bobsleigh World Championships in 2020 and 2021 with Kira Lipperheide and Ann-Christin Strack, respectively.

== Career ==
Former track and field athlete Kim Kalicki switched into bobsleigh at the age of 17. She made her debut in the European Bobsleigh Cup on the track in Winterberg in November, 2015 and took second place behind Sabrina Duljevic with her brakewoman Ann-Christin Strack. At the end of the 2015/16 season, she finished sixth overall in the European Bobsleigh Cup with 438 points. She qualified that season for the 2016 Junior Bobsleigh World Championships, which were held in Winterberg. She competed again together with Ann-Christin Strack and secured the silver medal behind the German team, consisting of Stephanie Schneider and Lisa Buckwitz.

In 2016/17 season, Kim Kalicki competed only one race in the European Cup competition in Winterberg on January 26, 2017. In this competition she took fifth place together with her brakewoman Lisa Sophie Gericke. They also competed at the 2017 Junior World Championships on the track in Winterberg, where she took third place behind British Mica Mcneill and compatriot Anna Köhler's team.

In 2017/18 season, Kim Kalicki and her brakewoman Lisa Sophie Gericke took consecutive third places in the European Cup competitions in Lillehammer on November 11 and 12, 2017. On January 12, 2018, with her brakewoman Sarah Noll, she was again able to achieve a podium finish in the European Cup on the course in Winterberg, behind Christin Senkel's team. At the end of the season she finished sixth in the overall standings of the European Cup with 410 points. This season she also competed at the Junior Bobsleigh World Championships and took third place with her brakewoman Lena Zelichowski behind the Romanian bobsled by Andreea Grecu and the German bobsled by Laura Nolte.

In 2018/19 season, she completed her first race of the season on January 10, 2019, in Innsbruck and, won the bobsleigh European Cup for the first time with her brakewoman Kira Lipperheide. The day after, they also won the second competition on the Olympic ice track in Igls. They also competed together at the 2019 World Junior Championships, finishing third place in the normal competition behind Austrian Katrin Beierl and Romanian Andreea Grecu's bobsleigh.

Before the 2019/20 season, Kim Kalicki took part in the German championship with Viktoria Dönicke in Oberhof and they secured second place behind Laura Nolte'steam. She made her debut world cup race on December 7, 2019, in Lake Placid with her brakewoman Vanessa Mark and they were able to go straight to the podium finish behind American Kaillie Humphries and the bobsleigh of the German's Stephanie Schneider.

== Career results ==
All results are sourced from the International Bobsleigh and Skeleton Federation (IBSF).

=== Olympic Games ===
Event	Two-woman	Monobob
Representing Germany
(China) 2022 Beijing	4th	—N/a
(Italy) 2026 Milano-Cortina	4th	15th

=== World Championships ===
Event	Two-woman	Monobob
Representing Germany
(Germany) 2020 Altenberg	2nd	—N/a
(Germany) 2021 Altenberg	2nd	6th
(Switzerland) 2023 St. Moritz	1st	5th
(Germany) 2024 Winterberg	3rd	12th
(United States) 2025 Lake Placid	2nd	10th

=== World Cup results ===
==== Two-woman ====
Season	1	2	3	4	5	6	7	8	Points	Place
2019–20	3	2	–	–	–	–	–	–	410	16th
2020–21	3	2	2	3	2	–	1	6	1431	2nd
2021–22	2	2	4	3	1	–	2	1	1472	3rd
2022–23	1	1	3	3	2	4	2	2	1672	2nd
2023–24	2	2	7	1	1	2	2	1	1683	2nd
2024–25	3	2	3	1	2		2	4	1447	2nd
2025–26	4	3	2	6	3	4	3	—N/a	1370	3rd

==== Monobob ====
Season	1	2	3	4	5	6	7	8	Points	Place
2022–23	5	6	5	3	7	7	8	2	1450	4th
2023–24	12	dns	–	6	–	–	–	–	304	18th
2024–25	4	4	8	8	6	5	10	12	1336	4th
2025–26	10	17	18	13	11	12	14	—N/a	808	12th
