= Lisa Buckwitz =

German bobsledder (born 1994)

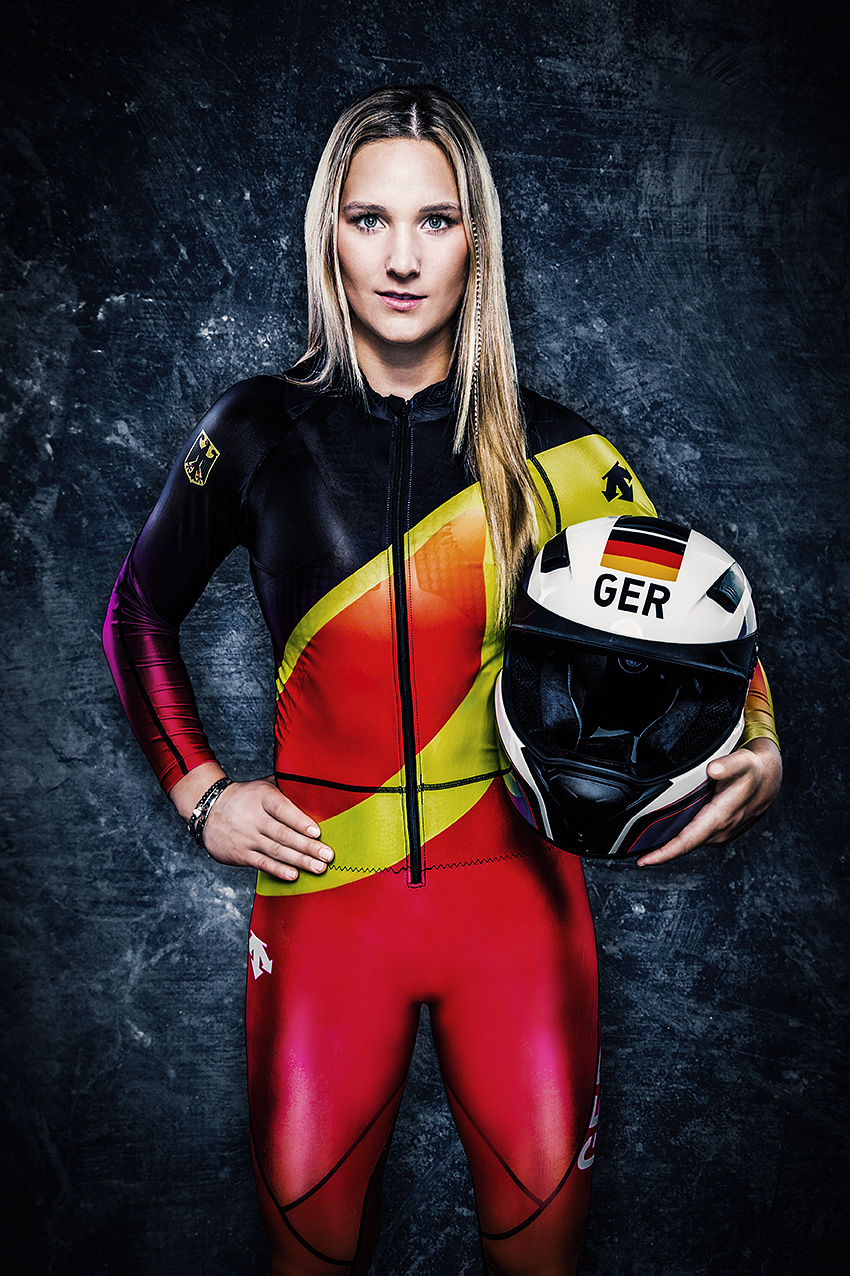
- Buckwitz in 2018

Personal information
- Full name: Lisa-Marie Buckwitz
- Born: 2 December 1994 (age 31) Berlin, Germany

Sport
- Country: Germany
- Sport: Bobsleigh
Medal record
Women's bobsleigh
Representing Germany
Olympic Games
Gold medal – first place	2018 Pyeongchang	Two-woman
Silver medal – second place	2026 Milano Cortina	Two-woman
World Championships
Gold medal – first place	2024 Winterberg	Two-woman
Silver medal – second place	2017 Königssee	Mixed team
Silver medal – second place	2023 St. Moritz	Two-woman
Bronze medal – third place	2023 St. Moritz	Monobob
Bronze medal – third place	2024 Winterberg	Monobob
Bronze medal – third place	2025 Lake Placid	Two-woman
European Championships
Gold medal – first place	2022 St. Moritz	Two-woman
Gold medal – first place	2024 Sigulda	Monobob
Silver medal – second place	2018 Innsbruck-Igls	Two-woman
Bronze medal – third place	2016 St. Moritz	Two-woman
Bronze medal – third place	2025 Lillehammer	Monobob
Bronze medal – third place	2025 Lillehammer	Two-woman

Lisa-Marie Buckwitz (born 2 December 1994) is a German bobsledder. She won a gold medal in the two-woman event at the 2018 Winter Olympics, and also competed at the 2022 Winter Olympics, as well as the 2026 Winter Olympics.

== Career ==
Buckwitz started off as a heptathlete. Buckwitz took up bobsleigh in 2013, and trains at the SC Potsdam club. She won two junior championships.

In 2015, Buckwitz and Cathleen Martini won the two-woman Bobsleigh World Cup event in Königssee. In 2016, Buckwitz and Stephanie Schneider won a bronze medal in the two-woman at the Bobsleigh European Championship, and came fourth in the two-woman event at the IBSF World Championships in Igls, Austria. In 2017, Buckwitz, Christopher Grotheer, Stephanie Schneider, Tina Hermann, Nico Walther and Philipp Wobeto won the silver medal in the mixed team event at the IBSF World Championships in Königssee. They finished behind another German team.

At the beginning of the 2017–18 season, German bobsleigh coach René Spies paired Buckwitz with Mariama Jamanka. The pair were nicknamed the "Berlin Bob", as Buckwitz and Jamanka are both from Berlin. Buckwitz and Jamanka won a silver medal at the 2018 Bobsleigh European Championships. At the 2018 Winter Olympics, Buckwitz and Jamanka competed in the two-woman event and won the gold medal. The win was unexpected, as the other German bobsleigh, containing Stephanie Schneider and Annika Drazek, was the favourite to win. German teams won all three of the bobsleigh events at the Games, and Buckwitz was the first person from Schöneiche to win an Olympic gold medal. As a result of her Olympic win, Buckwitz was awarded the Silbernes Lorbeerblatt (Silver Laurel Leaf), and was voted Brandenburg's Sportswoman of the Year.

Buckwitz and Jamanka won the opening race of the 2018–19 Bobsleigh World Cup in Sigulda, Latvia. Buckwitz has also competed in monobob events. At the 2022 Winter Olympics, Buckwitz and Kim Kalicki came fourth in the two-woman event.

She represented Germany at the 2026 Winter Olympics and won a silver medal in the two-woman event along with Neele Schuten.

== Personal life ==
Buckwitz is from Schöneiche, Berlin, Germany. Aside from her bobsleigh career, she has worked as a state police officer. In February 2022, Buckwitz was represented in the Olympic edition of the German Playboy magazine with a photo series. She was also featured on half of the covers, with Austrian skeleton racer Janine Flock the other half of the covers.

== Results ==
All results are sourced from the International Bobsleigh and Skeleton Federation (IBSF).

=== Olympic Games ===
Event	Two-woman	Monobob
(South Korea) 2018 Pyeongchang	1st	—N/a
(China) 2022 Beijing	4th	—
(Italy) 2026 Milano Cortina	2nd	4th

=== World Championships ===
Event	Two-woman	Monobob	Mixed team
(Germany) 2015 Winterberg	10th	—N/a	—
(Germany) 2016 Innsbruck	4th	—N/a	—
(Austria) 2017 Königssee	8th	—N/a	2nd
(Switzerland) 2023 St. Moritz	2nd	3rd	—N/a
(Germany) 2024 Winterberg	1st	3rd	—N/a
(United States) 2025 Lake Placid	3rd	5th	—N/a

=== World Cup ===
==== Two-woman ====
Season	1	2	3	4	5	6	7	8	Points	Place
2014–15	—	7	—	1	10	—	—	—	-	-
2015–16	—	—	—	—	—	—	6	13	-	-
2016–17	—	—	—	—	—	13	4	7	-	-
2017–18	3	4	—	1	3	—	3	4	-	-
2020–21	—	—	—	—	—	—	—	7	-	-
2021–22	—	—	—	—	1	—	—	1	-	-
2022–23	6	4	5	2	1	DNF	5	—	995	6th
2023–24	6	1	2	4	3	4	9	4	1539	3rd
2024–25	2	4	1	3	3	St. Moritz 2	3	2	1437	3rd
2025–26	7	5	3	2	2	5	6	—N/a	1332	4th

==== Monobob ====
Season	1	2	3	4	5	6	7	8	Points	Place
2022–23	9	2	3	4	4	DNS	1	—	1171	6th
2023–24	7	1	1	1	3	1	3	6	1644	1st
2024–25	2	1	1	1	4	6	5	3	1637	1st
2025–26	5	3	5	4	3	7	4	—N/a	1320	3rd
