= Leonie Kluwig =

German bobsledder (born 1998)

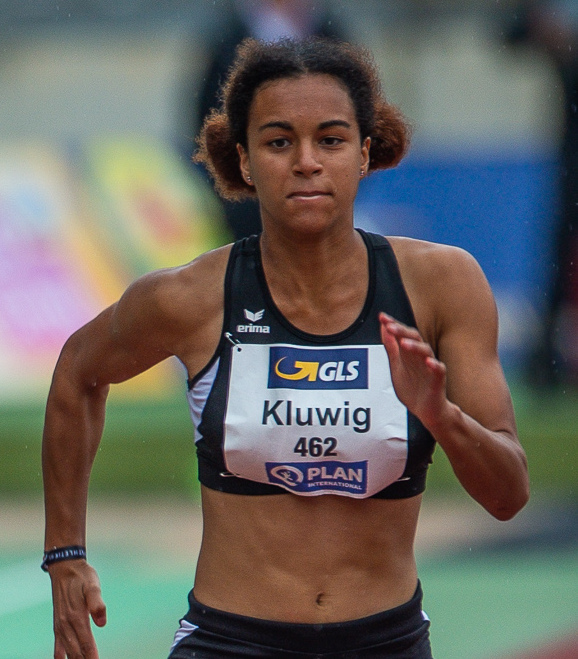
- Kluwig in 2018

Personal information
- Born: 30 November 1998 (age 27)
- Height: 1.70 m (5 ft 7 in)
- Weight: 64 kg (141 lb)

Sport
- Country: Germany
- Sport: Bobsleigh
- Event: Two-woman
- Coached by: René Thierfelder
Medal record
Women's bobsleigh
Representing Germany
European Championships
| Gold medal – first place | 2025 Lillehammer | Two-woman |
| Silver medal – second place | 2026 St. Moritz | Two-woman |

Leonie Kluwig (born 30 November 1998) is a German bobsledder.

== Career ==
During the 2024–25 Bobsleigh World Cup, Kluwig earned her first career Bobsleigh World Cup victory on 15 December 2024. She competed at the IBSF European Championships 2025 and won a gold medal in the two-woman event along with Laura Nolte, with a time of 1:44.40.
