= Rupert Schenk =

German bobsledder (born 2001)

Personal information
- Born: 11 February 2001 (age 25)
- Height: 1.89 m (6 ft 2 in)
- Weight: 88 kg (194 lb)

Sport
- Country: Germany
- Sport: Bobsleigh
- Event: Four-man
- Coached by: René Spies
Medal record
Men's bobsleigh
Representing Germany
World Championships
| Bronze medal – third place | 2024 Winterberg | Four-man |

Rupert Schenk (born 11 February 2001) is a German bobsledder.

== Career ==
In January 2022, Schenk competed at the IBSF Junior World Championships 2022 and won a gold medal in the two-man event.

In March 2024, he represented Germany at the IBSF World Championships 2024 and won a bronze medal in the four-man event, along with Adam Ammour, Issam Ammour and Benedikt Hertel. In March 2025, he competed at the IBSF World Championships 2025 and finished in fifth place in the four-man event.

== World Championships results ==
| Event | Four-man |
|---|---|
| (Switzerland) 2023 St. Moritz | 8th |
| (Germany) 2024 Winterberg | 3rd |
| (United States) 2025 Lake Placid | 5th |
