= Johannes Lochner =

German bobsledder (born 1990)

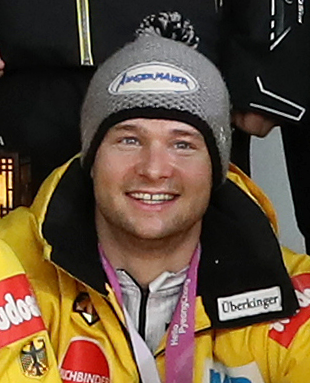
- Lochner in 2017

Personal information
- Nationality: German
- Born: 15 October 1990 (age 35) Berchtesgaden, Germany
- Height: 1.90 m (6 ft 3 in)
- Weight: 100 kg (220 lb)

Sport
- Country: Germany
- Sport: Bobsleigh
- Events: Two-man, Four-man
- Club: BC Stuttgart Solitude
- Turned pro: 2011
Medal record
Men's bobsleigh
Representing Germany
Olympic Games
Gold medal – first place	2026 Milano Cortina	Two-man
Gold medal – first place	2026 Milano Cortina	Four-man
Silver medal – second place	2022 Beijing	Two-man
Silver medal – second place	2022 Beijing	Four-man
World Championships
Gold medal – first place	2016 Igls	Mixed team
Gold medal – first place	2017 Königssee	Four-man
Gold medal – first place	2017 Königssee	Mixed team
Gold medal – first place	2019 Whistler	Mixed team
Gold medal – first place	2023 St. Moritz	Two-man
Silver medal – second place	2015 Winterberg	Two-man
Silver medal – second place	2015 Winterberg	Mixed team
Silver medal – second place	2016 Igls	Two-man
Silver medal – second place	2020 Altenberg	Two-man
Silver medal – second place	2020 Altenberg	Four-man
Silver medal – second place	2021 Alternberg	Two-man
Silver medal – second place	2024 Winterberg	Four-man
Silver medal – second place	2025 Lake Placid	Two-man
Silver medal – second place	2025 Lake Placid	Four-man
Bronze medal – third place	2017 Königssee	Two-man
Bronze medal – third place	2021 Altenberg	Four-man
Bronze medal – third place	2024 Winterberg	Two-man
European Championships
Gold medal – first place	2017 Winterberg	Four-man
Gold medal – first place	2018 Igls	Four-man
Gold medal – first place	2019 Königssee	Four-man
Gold medal – first place	2020 Winterberg	Four-man
Gold medal – first place	2023 Altenberg	Two-man
Gold medal – first place	2025 Lillehammer	Four-man
Gold medal – first place	2026 St. Moritz	Two-man
Silver medal – second place	2017 Winterberg	Two-man
Silver medal – second place	2019 Königssee	Two-man
Silver medal – second place	2021 Winterberg	Two-man
Silver medal – second place	2022 St. Moritz	Two-man
Silver medal – second place	2024 Igls	Four-man
Silver medal – second place	2025 Lillehammer	Two-man
Silver medal – second place	2026 St. Moritz	Four-man
Bronze medal – third place	2018 Igls	Two-man
Bronze medal – third place	2024 Sigulda	Two-man

Johannes Lochner (born 15 October 1990) is a German bobsledder who competed at the 2018 Winter Olympics and the 2022 Winter Olympics in Beijing where he won two silver medals. Lochner won the gold medal in the two-man and four-man events at the 2026 Winter Olympics.

== Bobsleigh results ==
All results are sourced from the International Bobsleigh and Skeleton Federation (IBSF).

=== Olympic Games ===
Event	Two-man	Four-man
(South Korea) 2018 Pyeongchang	5th	8th
(China) 2022 Beijing	2nd	2nd
(Italy) 2026 Milano Cortina	1st	1st

=== World Championships ===
Event	Two-man	Four-man	Team
(Germany) 2015 Winterberg	2nd (Note: Shared silver with Oskars Melbārdis.)	–	–
(Austria) 2016 Innsbruck	2nd	6th	1st
(Germany) 2017 Königssee	3rd	1st (Note: Shared gold with Francesco Friedrich.)	1st
(Canada) 2019 Whistler	8th	9th	1st
(Germany) 2020 Altenberg	2nd	2nd	—N/a
(Germany) 2021 Altenberg	2nd	3rd	—N/a
(Switzerland) 2023 St. Moritz	1st	4th	—N/a
(Germany) 2024 Winterberg	3rd	2nd	—N/a
(United States) 2025 Lake Placid	2nd	2nd	—N/a

=== World cup ===
==== Two-man ====
Season	Place	Points	1	2	3	4	5	6	7	8	9	10	11	12
2014–15	15th	680	–	–	–	–	5	8	5	7	—N/a	—N/a	—N/a	—N/a
2015–16	30th	152	–	–	–	–	–	–	–	9	—N/a	—N/a	—N/a	—N/a
2016–17	6th	1243	4	–	10	2	1	1	15	3	—N/a	—N/a	—N/a	—N/a
2017–18	6th	1240	11	6	20	15	4	6	3	2	—N/a	—N/a	—N/a	—N/a
2018–19	10th	988	–	–	DNF	3	2	2	7	3	—N/a	—N/a	—N/a	—N/a
2019–20	15th	660	1	2	–	–	–	1	–	–	—N/a	—N/a	—N/a	—N/a
2020–21	2nd	2453	2	2	5	3	1	2	3	3	2	2	2	5
2021–22	4th	1512	2	2	2	10	6	9	2	3	—N/a			
2022–23	1st	1742	3	4	1	1	1	1	1	1	—N/a			
2023–24	2nd	1512	1	2	1	1	1	4	–	2	—N/a			
2024–25	1st	1745	1	2	1	3	1	1	2	1	—N/a			
2025–26	1st	1560	1	1	2	1	1	1	1	—N/a				

==== Four-man ====
Season	Place	Points	1	2	3	4	5	6	7	8
2016–17	6th	1243	3	–	1	1	4	1	dsq	6
2017–18	1st	1652	4	1	5	1	1	5	1	4
2018–19	3rd	1605	3	2	4	1	3	2	7	3
2019–20	2nd	1649	4	2	4	1	2	2	2	3
2020–21	4th	768	5	4	3	4	—N/a	—N/a	—N/a	—N/a
2021–22	5th	1402	2	7	4	2	5	21	4	5
2022–23	3rd	1570	6	2	4	3	3	4	3	3
2023–24	3rd	1515	1	1	2	2	1	2	–	2
2024–25	2nd	1446	2	6	2	3	3	St. Moritz 3	1	1
2025–26	1st	1515	1	2	1	1	2	2	2	—N/a
