= Leon Greenwood =

British bobsledder (born 1997)

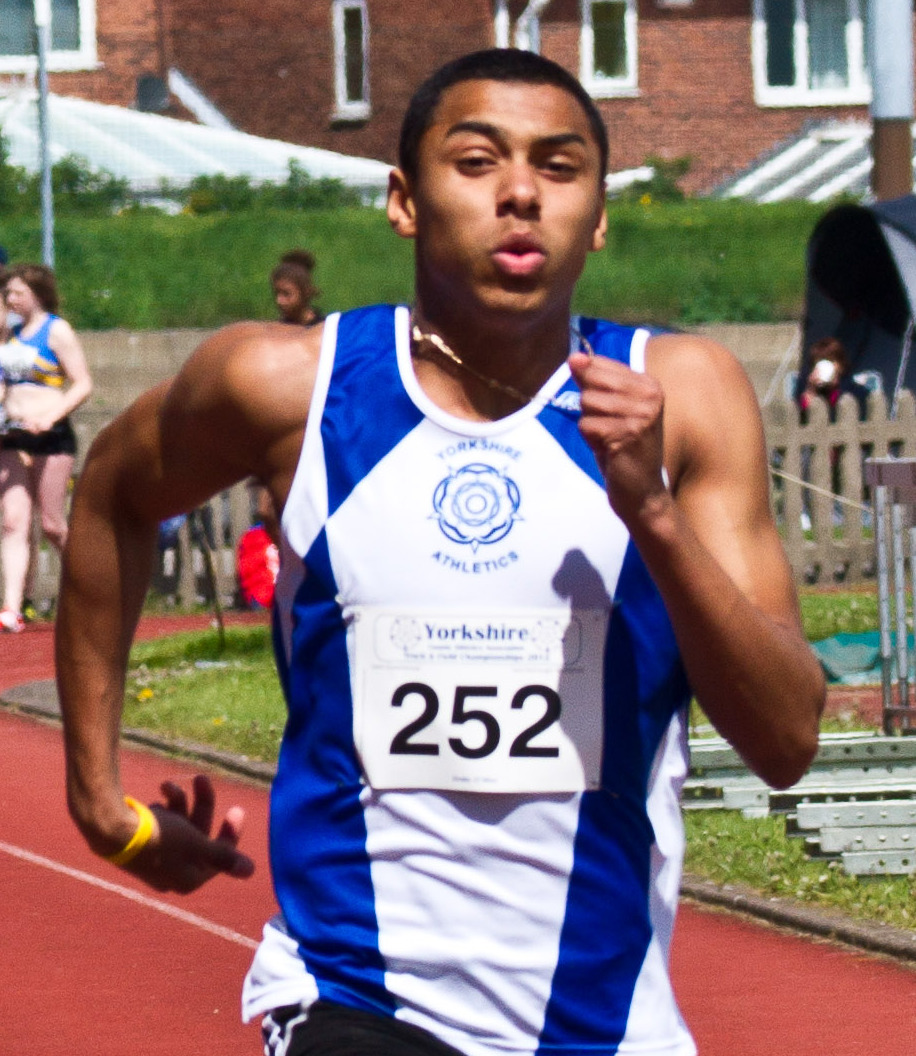
- Greenwood in 2012

Personal information
- Nationality: British
- Born: 13 June 1997 (age 29)

Sport
- Sport: Bobsleigh
Medal record
Men's bobsleigh
Representing Great Britain
European Championships
Bronze medal – third place	2025 Lillehammer	Four-man

Leon Greenwood (born 13 June 1997) is a British bobsledder. He was a bronze medalist in the four-man bobsleigh in the 2024–25 Bobsleigh World Cup and at the 2025 European Championships.

== Career ==
=== Athletics ===
From Batley, he was a member of Spenborough Harriers in Yorkshire. He competed in athletics as a sprinter. He became Welsh 200 metres champion and a finalist at the British indoor athletics championships, before suffering an ankle injury that required surgery and a two-year rehabilitation period. He later worked as a sprint coach at The Newbury Athletics Club in Berkshire.

Prior to bobsleigh, Leon was a police officer.

=== Bobsleigh ===
After a society talent ID day at the University of Bath, Greenwood joined the British Bobsleigh programme in 2022. He was a member of the Great Britain squad that won silver at the IBSF World Championships 2023 in Saint Moritz.

He was a member of the Great Britain four-man bobsleigh team that won a bronze medal in the 2024–25 Bobsleigh World Cup, alongside Brad Hall, Taylor Lawrence and Arran Gulliver. The four also won bronze at the IBSF European Championships 2025 in Lillehammer.

Greenwood competed at the 2026 Winter Olympics in the two-man and four-man competitions, finishing 12th and 7th respectively. He was initially only competing in the four-man event, but stepped in for the third and fourth heats of the two-man after team-mate Taylor Lawrence sustained an injury.

== Personal life ==
He is in a relationship with Nicole Cockburn, a primary school teacher, and has a daughter born in 2024.
