= IBSF European Championships 2025 =

European Bobsleigh and Skeleton Championships

2025 European Championships
- Venue: Lillehammer Olympic Bobsleigh and Luge Track
- Location: (Norway) Lillehammer
- Dates: 7–9 February

The 2025 IBSF European Championships were held from 7 to 9 February 2025 in Lillehammer, Norway.

== Schedule ==
Six events are planned.

All times are local (UTC+1).

Skeleton

Date	Time	Events
7 February	9:00	Men run 1 & 2
7 February	13:00	Women run 1 & 2

Bobsleigh

Date	Time	Events
8 February	9:00	Women's Monobob run 1 & 2
8 February	12:30	Two-men run 1 & 2
9 February	9:00	Two-women run 1 & 2
9 February	13:00	Four-men run 1 & 2

== Medal summary ==
=== Medal table ===
* Host nation (Norway)

Rank	Nation	Gold	Silver	Bronze	Total
1	Germany	4	3	3	10
2	Austria	2	0	0	2
3	Great Britain	0	2	2	4
4	Switzerland	0	1	1	2
5	Netherlands	0	0	1	1
Totals (5 entries)		6	6	7	19

=== Skeleton ===
Event	Gold		Silver		Bronze	
Men	Samuel Maier; Austria	1:42.81	Marcus Wyatt; Great Britain	1:42.82	Axel Jungk; Germany	1:42.84
Women	Janine Flock; Austria	1:44.13	Amelia Coltman; Great Britain	1:44.98	Kimberley Bos; Netherlands	1:45.18

=== Bobsleigh ===
Event	Gold		Silver		Bronze	
Women's Monobob	Laura Nolte; Germany	1:49.21	Melanie Hasler; Switzerland	1:49.33	Lisa Buckwitz; Germany	1:49.36
Two-woman	Germany; Laura Nolte; Leonie Kluwig	1:44.40	Germany; Kim Kalicki; Leonie Fiebig	1:44.42	Germany; Lisa Buckwitz; Kira Lipperheide	1:44.70
Two-man	Germany; Francesco Friedrich; Alexander Schüller	1:41.15	Germany; Johannes Lochner; Georg Fleischhauer	1:41.29	Great Britain; Brad Hall; Taylor Lawrence	1:41.63
Four-man	Germany; Johannes Lochner; Florian Bauer; Jörn Wenzel; Georg Fleischhauer	1:39.85	Germany; Francesco Friedrich; Matthias Sommer; Alexander Schüller; Felix Straub	1:39.90	Great Britain; Brad Hall; Taylor Lawrence; Arran Gulliver; Leon Greenwood Switzerland; Michael Vogt; Gregory Jones; Andreas Haas; Amadou David Ndiaye	1:40.05

== See also ==
- Bobsleigh and Skeleton European Championship
