= Brad Hall (bobsledder) =

British bobsledder (born 1990)

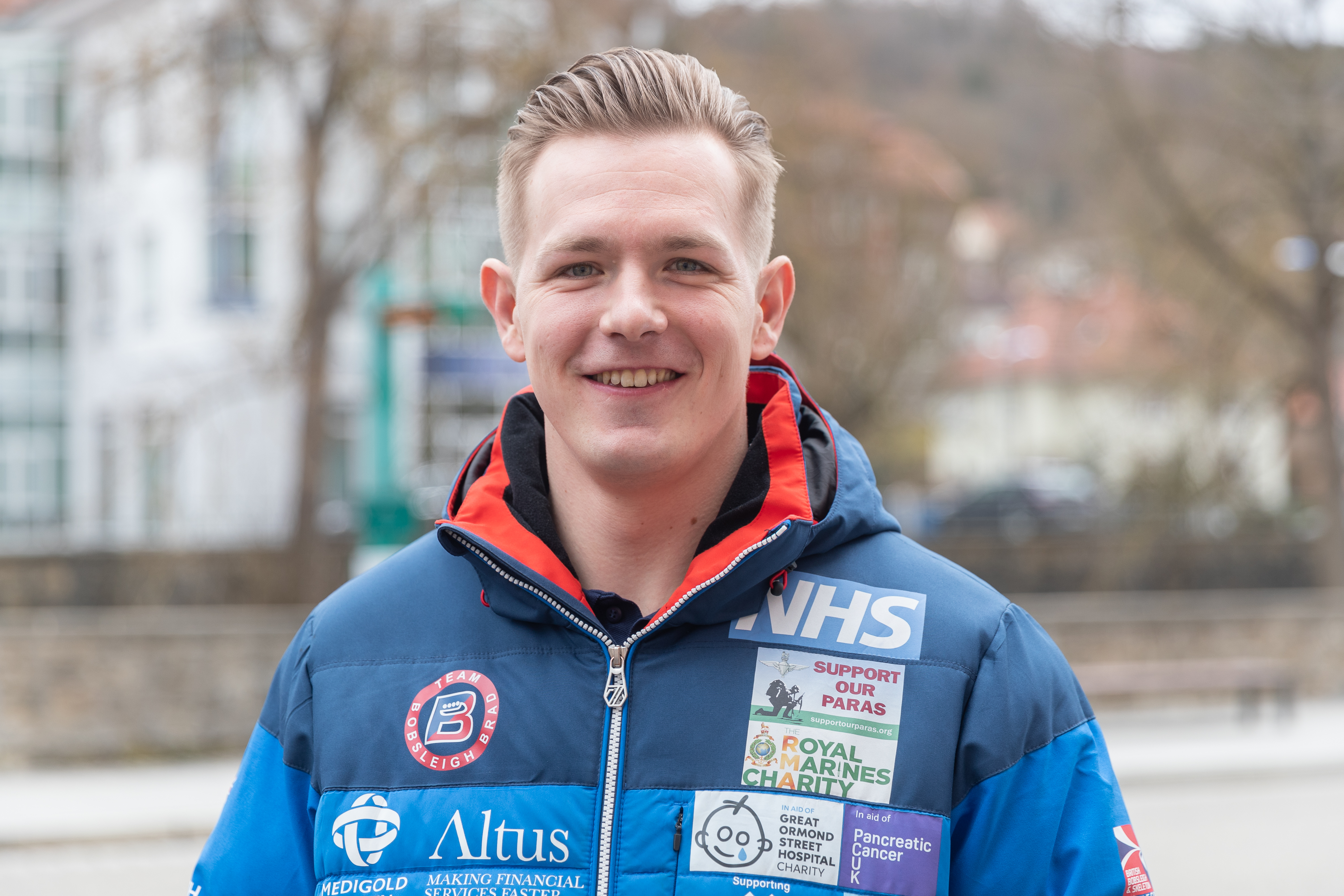
- Brad Hall in 2021

Personal information
- Full name: Bradley Hall
- Nationality: British
- Born: 16 November 1990 (age 35) Chichester, Great Britain
- Height: 1.87 m (6 ft 2 in)
- Weight: 98 kg (216 lb)

Sport
- Sport: Bobsleigh
Medal record
Men's bobsleigh
Representing Great Britain
World Championships
| Silver medal – second place | 2023 St. Moritz | Four-man |
| Bronze medal – third place | 2025 Lake Placid | Four-man |
European Championships
| Gold medal – first place | 2023 Altenberg | Four-man |
| Bronze medal – third place | 2025 Lillehammer | Two-man |
| Bronze medal – third place | 2025 Lillehammer | Four-man |
| Bronze medal – third place | 2026 St. Moritz | Two-man |

Bradley Hall (born 16 November 1990) is a British bobsledder. He competed in the two-man event and the four-man event at both the 2018 Winter Olympics and the 2022 Winter Olympics. In 2023, he became a European champion in the four-man format.

== Early life ==
Hall took up sports after getting into trouble at school. He studied at Hazelwick School in Crawley, West Sussex, where he was taught by comedian Romesh Ranganathan for maths. He played rugby and athletics and took up winter sports following his participation in a UK Sport talent identification scheme called Power to Podium while he was at university. He initially tried skeleton but later attended trials for the bobsleigh team.

== Career ==
In November 2017, Hall was a member of the four-man team who won a bronze medal in the 2017-18 World Cup event in Park City. At the 2018 Winter Olympics, Hall finished 17th in the four-man event and 12th in the two-man event.

After Great Britain's bobsleigh squad failed to challenge for medals in the bobsleigh at the 2018 Winter Olympics, UK Sport ended its funding for the sport. Hall chose to launch a crowd fundraiser in February 2019 to raise £6000 for racing equipment.

In the 2019-20 World Cup, Hall finished in second place with Greg Cackett in the two-man race at Igls. This was the first time that a British bobsleigh team had won a medal in the two-man format in the history of the competition. His joint fourth in the two-man World Championships in Whistler in 2019 was the best British result in the competition for over 50 years.

In December 2022, Hall led Great Britain to gold in the four-man event at the World Cup meeting in Lake Placid. He had recorded 13 career podium finishes in World Cups but this was his first gold. In January 2023, he also won a silver medal with Taylor Lawrence in the two-man event at Altenberg. The following day, Hall's British team won a gold medal in the four-man event. Later that month, Hall led Great Britain to their first ever European title in the four-man event. Racing alongside Arran Gulliver, Greg Cackett and Taylor Lawrence, the quartet beat Germany by 0.09 seconds in Altenberg. At the 2023 World Championships in St Moritz, he piloted the British team to a silver medal which they jointly shared with Latvia. It was Great Britain's first medal in the four-man bobsleigh in a World Championships for 84 years.

In January 2025, Hall helped Great Britain win two gold medals in the four-man at the World Cup meetings in Winterberg (the first occasion since 2012 that a German team had failed to win a World Cup event at the venue) and St Moritz. In February, Hall won a bronze medal in both the two-man and four-man events in the World Cup meeting in Lillehammer. In March, he led Great Britain to a bronze medal in the World Championships at Lake Placid in the four-man event.

In January 2026, Hall won a bronze medal in the two-man event at the World Cup meeting in St Moritz. The event also doubled up as the European Championships. In February, it was announced that Hall and figure skater Lilah Fear had been selected as the Team GB flag bearers for the 2026 Winter Olympics opening ceremony. At the Games, Hall took part in the Two-man Bobsleigh competition with Taylor Lawrence and the pair were eighth after the first two runs. Lawrence then pulled out with an injury, and Leon Greenwood stepped in for the final two runs. The duo finished the event in twelfth position. He then finished seventh in the Four-man competition.

== Career results ==
=== Olympic Games ===
| Event | Two-man | Four-man |
Representing Great Britain
| (South Korea) 2018 Pyeongchang | 12th | 17th |
| (China) 2022 Beijing | 11th | 6th |
| (Italy) 2026 Milan-Cortina | 12th | 7th |

=== World Championships ===
| Event | Two-man | Four-man |
Representing Great Britain
| (Austria) 2016 Innsbruck | 17th | 11th * |
| (Germany) 2017 Königssee | 28th | DNF ** |
| (Canada) 2019 Whistler | 4th | 13th |
| (Germany) 2020 Altenberg | 16th | 7th |
| (Germany) 2021 Altenberg | 11th | DNF *** |
| (Switzerland) 2023 St. Moritz | 5th | 2nd |
| (Germany) 2024 Winterberg | 4th | 6th |
| (United States) 2025 Lake Placid | 6th | 3rd |

* as a brakeman

** crash at the second run

*** DNS at the third run

=== Bobsleigh World Cup ===
==== Two-man ====
| Season | Place | Points | 1 | 2 | 3 | 4 | 5 | 6 | 7 | 8 | 9 | 10 | 11 | 12 |
|---|---|---|---|---|---|---|---|---|---|---|---|---|---|---|
| 2014–15 | 34th | 119 | — | — | — | — | — | 19 | 24 | — | | | | |
| 2015–16 | 22nd | 268 | — | — | 20 | — | — | — | 18 | 13 | | | | |
| 2016–17 | 32nd | 151 | — | — | — | — | — | 27 | 24 | 19 | | | | |
| 2017–18 | 19th | 617 | 19 | DNF | 13 | 24 | 19 | 14 | 18 | 14 | | | | |
| 2018–19 | 19th | 592 | — | — | 15 | 9 | 8 | 6 | — | — | | | | |
| 2019–20 | 8th | 1050 | — | — | 4 | 2 | 6 | 8 | 5 | 12 | | | | |
| 2020–21 | 12th | 1296 | — | — | — | — | 7 | 6 | 12 | 8 | 7 | 10 | 5 | 7 |
| 2021–22 | 5th | 1444 | 3 | 5 | 11 | 9 | 2 | 2 | 6 | 6 | | | | |
| 2022–23 | 3rd | 1582 | 2 | 2 | 5 | 3 | 2 | 4 | 5 | 4 | | | | |
| 2023–24 | 14th | 632 | − | – | 11 | 9 | 6 | 7 | – | – | | | | |
| 2024–25 | 2nd | 1538 | 3 | 4 | 2 | 4 | 6 | 5 | 3 | 5 | | | | |
| 2025–26 | 6th | 1056 | 6 | 17 | 12 | 7 | 14 | 3 | 5 | —N/a | | | | |

==== Four-man ====
| Season | Place | Points | 1 | 2 | 3 | 4 | 5 | 6 | 7 | 8 |
|---|---|---|---|---|---|---|---|---|---|---|
| 2016–17 | 21st | 368 | — | — | — | — | — | 12 | 18 | 8 |
| 2017–18 | 12th | 952 | 22 | 3 | 9 | 13 | 13 | 15 | 10 | 22 |
| 2018–19 | 14th | 610 | 15 | 17 | 13 | 19 | 14 | 14 | – | – |
| 2019–20 | 13th | 728 | – | – | 9 | 10 | 8 | 12 | 10 | DNS |
| 2020–21 | 17th | 328 | DNS | DNS | 7 | 8 | —N/a | | | |
| 2021–22 | 4th | 1430 | 2 | 11 | 9 | 5 | 2 | 7 | 2 | 8 |
| 2022–23 | 2nd | 1707 | 2 | 4 | 1 | 2 | 1 | 1 | 2 | 2 |
| 2023–24 | 13th | 552 | – | – | – | 6 | 6 | 3 | – | – |
| 2024–25 | 3rd | 1444 | 5 | 1 | 3 | 2 | 1 | St. Moritz 3 | 3 | 3 |
| 2025–26 | 4th | 1224 | 6 | 10 | 6 | 5 | 4 | 8 | 4 | —N/a |

Olympic Games
| Preceded by Eve Muirhead and Dave Ryding | Flagbearer for United Kingdom (with Lilah Fear); Milano Cortina 2026 | Succeeded by |
