= Bobsleigh at the 2022 Winter Olympics =

Bobsleigh at the XXIV Olympic Winter Games
- Venue: Xiaohaituo Bobsleigh and Luge Track
- Dates: 13–20 February 2022
- No. of events: 4 (2 men, 2 women)
- Competitors: 165 from 23 nations (119 men and 46 women)

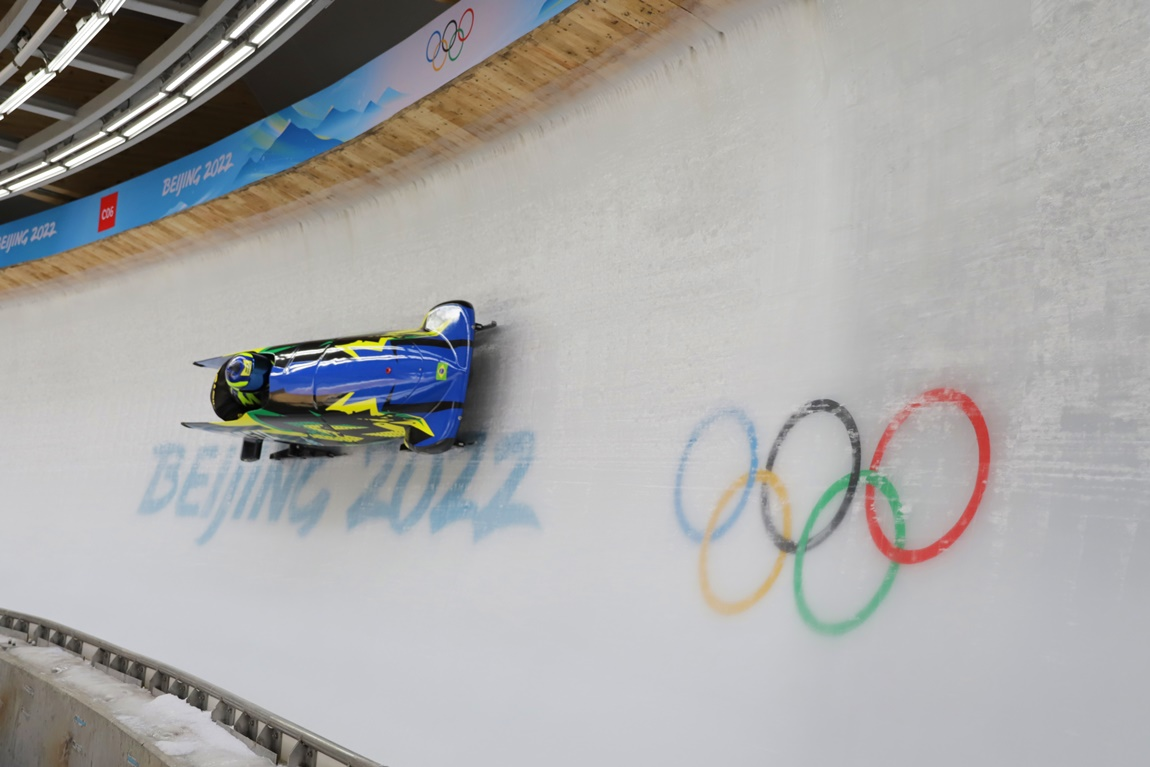
Bobsled training at the Olympics on the official track on February 2, 2022

Bobsleigh at the 2022 Winter Olympics has been held at the Xiaohaituo Bobsleigh and Luge Track which is one of the Yanqing cluster venues. A total of four bobsleigh events were held, between 13 and 20 February 2022.

In July 2018, the International Olympic Committee (IOC) officially added the women's monobob event to the program, increasing the total number of events to four. The IOC also transferred six quotas from the men's events to the women's. The quota limit of 170 athletes remained the same from the 2018 Winter Olympics. A total of four events have been contested, two each for men and women.

== Qualification ==
A maximum of 170 quota spots will be available to athletes to compete at the games (124 men and 46 women). The qualification is based on the world rankings of 16 January 2022.

== Competition schedule ==
The following is the competition schedule for all four events.

All times are in local time (UTC+8), according to the official schedule correct as of March 2021. This schedule may be subject to change in due time.

Date	Time	Event
13 February	09:30	Women's monobob - Heats 1 and 2
14 February	09:30	Women's monobob - Heats 3 and 4
14 February	20:15	Two-man - Heats 1 and 2
15 February	20:05	Two-man - Heats 3 and 4
18 February	20:00	Two-woman - Heats 1 and 2
19 February	09:30	Four-man - Heats 1 and 2
19 February	20:00	Two-woman - Heats 3 and 4
20 February	09:30	Four-man - Heats 3 and 4

== Medal summary ==
=== Medal table ===
Rank	NOC	Gold	Silver	Bronze	Total
1	Germany	3	3	1	7
2	United States	1	1	1	3
3	Canada	0	0	2	2
Totals (3 entries)		4	4	4	12

=== Medalists ===
Event	Gold		Silver		Bronze	
Two-man	Germany; Francesco Friedrich; Thorsten Margis	3:56.89	Germany; Johannes Lochner; Florian Bauer	3:57.38	Germany; Christoph Hafer; Matthias Sommer	3:58.58
Four-man	Germany; Francesco Friedrich; Thorsten Margis; Candy Bauer; Alexander Schüller	3:54.30	Germany; Johannes Lochner; Florian Bauer; Christopher Weber; Christian Rasp	3:54.67	Canada; Justin Kripps; Ryan Sommer; Cam Stones; Ben Coakwell	3:55.09
Women's monobob	Kaillie Humphries; United States	4:19.27	Elana Meyers Taylor; United States	4:20.81	Christine de Bruin; Canada	4:21.03
Two-woman	Germany; Laura Nolte; Deborah Levi	4:03.96	Germany; Mariama Jamanka; Alexandra Burghardt	4:04.73	United States; Elana Meyers Taylor; Sylvia Hoffman	4:05.48

== Participating nations ==
A total of 165 athletes (119 men and 46 women) from 23 nations (including the IOC's designation of ROC for the Russian Olympic Committee) qualified to participate.

The numbers in parentheses represents the number of participants entered.

- Australia (2)
- Austria (10)
- Belgium (2)
- Brazil (4)
- Canada (18)
- China (12)
- Czech Republic (4)
- France (6)
- Germany (18)
- Great Britain (6)
- Italy (9)
- Jamaica (6)
- Latvia (5)
- Monaco (2)
- Netherlands (5)
- ROC (12)
- Romania (6)
- Slovakia (1)
- South Korea (9)
- Switzerland (12)
- Trinidad and Tobago (3)
- Ukraine (1)
- United States (12)
