= Arran Gulliver =

British bobsledder (born 1997)

Personal information
- Nationality: British
- Born: 3 July 1997 (age 28)

Sport
- Sport: Bobsleigh
Medal record
Men's bobsleigh
Representing Great Britain
World Championships
Silver medal – second place	2023 St. Moritz	Four-man
Disqualified	2025 Lake Placid	Four-man
European Championships
Gold medal – first place	2023 Altenberg	Four-man
Bronze medal – third place	2025 Lillehammer	Four-man

Arran Gulliver (born 3 July 1997) is a British bobsledder.

== Early life ==
Born in Worcestershire, he attended The Bewdley School. He took part in athletics and judo and participated in CrossFit before forging a bobsleigh career. He was British schools judo Champion in 2015, and has a 100m sprint time of 10.75 seconds.

== Career ==
He started training for bobsleigh in the Summer of 2022 after seeing an advert for the British Bobsleigh programme in Bath. He had been due to start training to be a police officer, but instead chose to focus on bobsleigh, following the successful trials. He first set foot in a bobsleigh in late October 2022.

He was a gold medalist with the British four-man team at the IBSF European Championships 2023 in Germany. He was a silver medalist in the Four-man bobsled at the IBSF World Championships 2023 in St Moritz, Switzerland. For the Great Britain team, it was a first four-man World Championships medal in 84 years.

He was a member of the Great Britain four-man bobsleigh team that won a bronze medal in the 2024–25 Bobsleigh World Cup, alongside Brad Hall, Leon Greenwood and Taylor Lawrence.

He was a bronze medalist in the four-man at the IBSF European Championships 2025 in Lillehammer, Norway. Although he was part of the team that placed third in the four-man at the IBSF World Championships 2025 in Lake Placid, United States, his personal bronze medal was later disqualified due an anti-doping violation.

Following a provisional suspension, in October 2025 Gulliver was issued with a two-year ban backdated to March 2025 for an anti-doping rule violation for unintentional use of ostarine.
