= IBSF World Championships 2025 =

Bobsleigh and skeleton championships

- Venue: Mt. Van Hoevenberg Olympic Bobsled Run
- Location: Lake Placid
- Dates: 6–15 March

The 2025 IBSF World Championships were held in Lake Placid, United States from 6 to 15 March 2025.

== Schedule ==
Seven events were held.

All times are local (UTC–5 for events from 6–8 March, UTC–4 from 9 March onwards).

Bobsleigh

Date	Time	Events
8 March	09:00	Two-man run 1
8 March	11:00	Two-man run 2
8 March	14:00	Women's Monobob run 1
8 March	16:00	Women's Monobob run 2
9 March	10:30	Two-man run 3
9 March	12:30	Two-man run 4
9 March	15:30	Women's Monobob run 3
9 March	17:30	Women's Monobob run 4
14 March	09:00	Four-man run 1
14 March	10:45	Four-man run 2
14 March	14:00	Two-woman run 1
14 March	15:45	Two-woman run 2
15 March	09:00	Four-man run 3
15 March	10:45	Four-man run 4
15 March	14:00	Two-woman run 3
15 March	15:45	Two-woman run 4

Skeleton

Date	Time	Events
6 March	09:00	Men run 1
6 March	11:00	Men run 2
6 March	14:00	Women run 1
6 March	16:00	Women run 2
7 March	10:45	Men run 3
7 March	12:45	Men run 4
7 March	16:00	Women run 3
7 March	18:00	Women run 4
8 March	19:00	Skeleton mixed team

== Medal summary ==
=== Medal table ===
* Host nation (United States)

Rank	Nation	Gold	Silver	Bronze	Total
1	Germany	3	4	3	10
2	United States*	2	1	1	4
3	Great Britain	1	2	1	4
4	Netherlands	1	0	0	1
5	China	0	0	1	1
5	Czech Republic	0	0	1	1
Totals (6 entries)		7	7	7	21

=== Bobsleigh ===
Event	Gold		Silver		Bronze	
Two-man	Germany; Francesco Friedrich; Alexander Schüller	3:39.32	Germany; Johannes Lochner; Georg Fleischhauer	3:39.35	Germany; Adam Ammour; Benedikt Hertel	3:40.15
Four-man	Germany; Francesco Friedrich; Matthias Sommer; Alexander Schüller; Felix Straub	2:44.52	Germany; Johannes Lochner; Florian Bauer; Jörn Wenzel; Georg Fleischhauer	2:44.80	United Kingdom; Brad Hall; Arran Gulliver; Taylor Lawrence; Greg Cackett	2:45.00
Women's Monobob	Kaysha Love; United States	3:57.82	Laura Nolte; Germany	3:58.26	Elana Meyers Taylor; United States	3:58.31
Two-woman	Germany; Laura Nolte; Deborah Levi	3:46.00	Germany; Kim Kalicki; Leonie Fiebig	3:46.52	Germany; Lisa Buckwitz; Kira Lipperheide	3:47.46

=== Skeleton ===
Event	Gold		Silver		Bronze	
Men	Matt Weston; Great Britain	3:35.48	Marcus Wyatt; Great Britain	3:37.38	Axel Jungk; Germany	3:37.41
Women	Kimberley Bos; Netherlands	3:40.06	Mystique Ro; United States	3:40.73	Anna Fernstädt; Czech Republic	3:40.81
Skeleton mixed team	United States; Mystique Ro; Austin Florian	1:54.53; 58.15; 56.38	Great Britain; Tabitha Stoecker; Matt Weston	1:54.63; 58.31; 56.32	China; Zhao Dan; Lin Qinwei	1:54.81; 58.67; 56.14
