= Laura Nolte =

German bobsledder (born 1998)

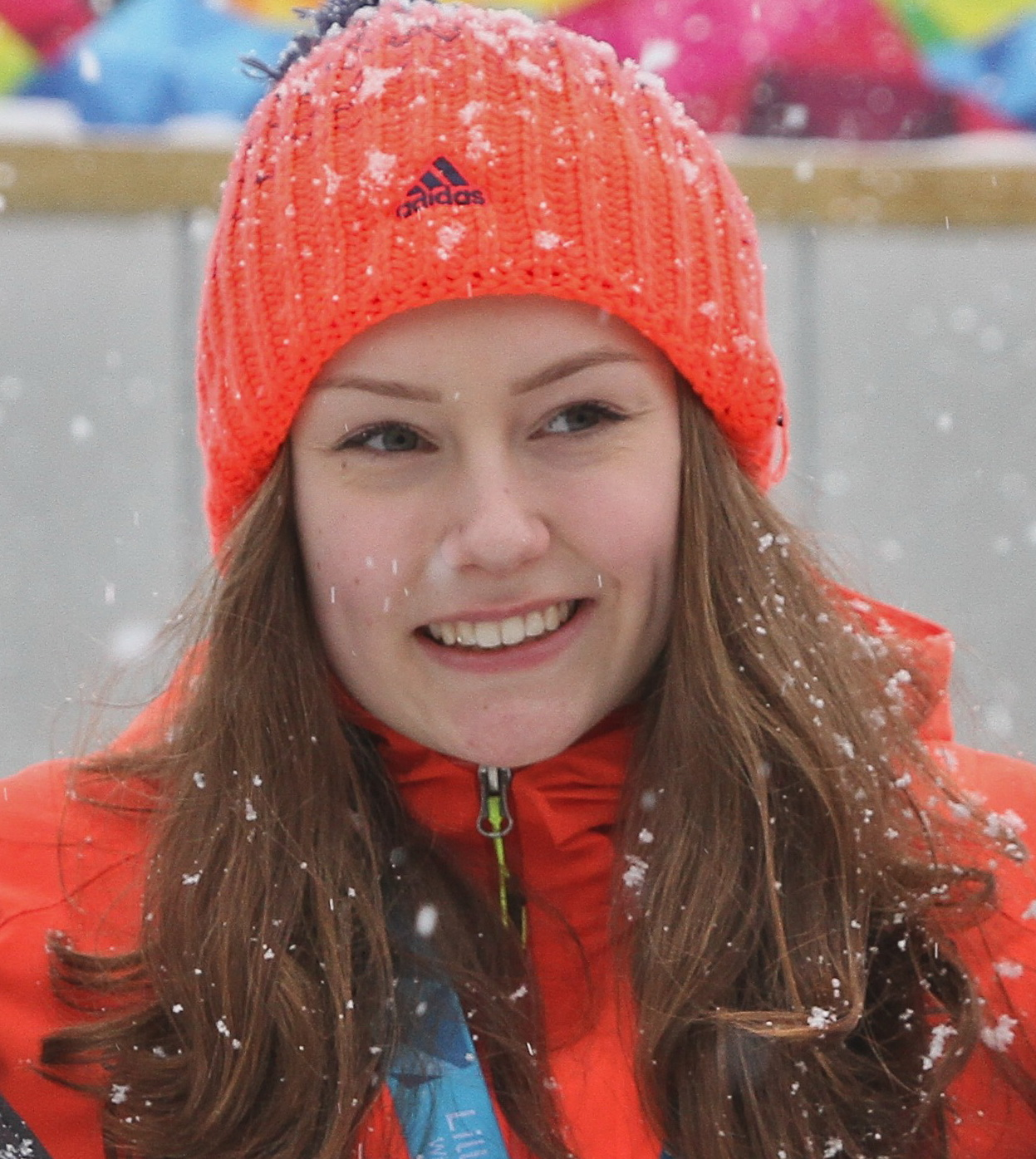
- Laura Nolte in 2016

Personal information
- Nationality: German
- Born: 23 November 1998 (age 27) Unna, Germany
- Height: 1.80 m (5 ft 11 in)
- Weight: 74 kg (163 lb)

Sport
- Country: Germany
- Sport: Bobsleigh
- Event: Two-woman
- Club: BSC Winterberg
Medal record
Women's bobsleigh
Representing Germany
Olympic Games
| Gold medal – first place | 2022 Beijing | Two-woman |
| Gold medal – first place | 2026 Milano Cortina | Two-woman |
| Silver medal – second place | 2026 Milano Cortina | Monobob |
World Championships
| Gold medal – first place | 2023 St. Moritz | Monobob |
| Gold medal – first place | 2024 Winterberg | Monobob |
| Gold medal – first place | 2025 Lake Placid | Two-woman |
| Silver medal – second place | 2024 Winterberg | Two-woman |
| Silver medal – second place | 2025 Lake Placid | Monobob |
| Bronze medal – third place | 2021 Alternberg | Two-woman |
| Bronze medal – third place | 2021 Alternberg | Monobob |
European Championships
| Gold medal – first place | 2021 Winterberg | Two-woman |
| Gold medal – first place | 2023 Altenberg | Monobob |
| Gold medal – first place | 2023 Altenberg | Two-woman |
| Gold medal – first place | 2024 Sigulda | Two-woman |
| Gold medal – first place | 2025 Lillehammer | Monobob |
| Gold medal – first place | 2025 Lillehammer | Two-woman |
| Silver medal – second place | 2022 St. Moritz | Monobob |
| Silver medal – second place | 2026 St. Moritz | Two-woman |
| Bronze medal – third place | 2022 St. Moritz | Two-woman |
| Bronze medal – third place | 2024 Sigulda | Monobob |
| Bronze medal – third place | 2026 St. Moritz | Monobob |
Junior World Championships
| Gold medal – first place | 2021 St. Moritz | Two-woman |
| Silver medal – second place | 2018 St. Moritz | Two-woman |
Winter Youth Olympic Games
| Gold medal – first place | 2016 Lillehammer | Monobob |

Laura Nolte (born 23 November 1998) is a German bobsleigh pilot, who began competing for the national team in 2015 and won the gold medal in the two-woman bobsleigh event at the 2022 Winter Olympics, becoming the youngest in bobsleigh history to win the title. In 2023 she has become the first European to win the Monobob World Champion title at the Sankt Moritz World Championships, while being also the winner of the 2023 European Monobob Champion title in Altenberg, Germany. In 2021, she won the gold medal in the two-woman event at the IBSF European Championships 2021 held in Winterberg, Germany. In the same season, she also won the gold medal in the two-woman event at the IBSF Junior World Championships 2021 held in St. Moritz, Switzerland.

== Career ==
In 2016, she won the gold medal in the girls' monobob event at the Winter Youth Olympics held in Lillehammer, Norway. In 2020, she competed in the two-woman event at the IBSF World Championships 2020 held in Altenberg, Germany.

In February 2021, she won the bronze medal in the two-woman event at the IBSF World Championships 2021 held in Altenberg, Germany. She also won the bronze medal in the monobob event.

In February 2022, she won the gold medal in the two-woman competition in bobsleigh at the 2022 Winter Olympics, which was held on 18 February (heats 1 and 2) and 19 February (heats 3 and 4), at the Xiaohaituo Bobsleigh and Luge Track in Yanqing District of Beijing, achieving three track records during the four runs and becoming the youngest bobsleigh pilot in history to win the title.

In December 2022, Laura Nolte has achieved her first World Cup win in Monobob in Lake Placid, while setting the track record during the first run. In January 2023, the second Monobob World Cup win followed in Winterberg, then a track record at the first Altenberg Monobob event of the season and her first Monobob European Champion title in Altenberg. At the Monobob event at the IBSF World Championships 2023, held at the Sankt Moritz Celerina Olympic Bobrun, on 28 and 29 January, Laura Nolte has won her first World Champion title by setting the fastest time in three of the runs and obtaining the track record during the second run.

She represented Germany at the 2026 Winter Olympics and won a gold medal in the two-woman event along with Deborah Levi.

== Career results ==
All results are sourced from the International Bobsleigh and Skeleton Federation (IBSF).

=== Olympic Games ===
| Event | Two-woman | Monobob |
|---|---|---|
| (China) 2022 Beijing | 1st | 4th |
| (Italy) 2026 Milano Cortina | 1st | 2nd |

=== World Championships ===
| Event | Two-woman | Monobob |
|---|---|---|
| (Germany) 2020 Altenberg | DNF | —N/a |
| (Germany) 2021 Altenberg | 3rd | 3rd |
| (Switzerland) 2023 St. Moritz | DNF | 1st |
| (Germany) 2024 Winterberg | 2nd | 1st |
| (United States) 2025 Lake Placid | 1st | 2nd |

=== World Cup results ===
==== Two-woman ====
| Season | 1 | 2 | 3 | 4 | 5 | 6 | 7 | 8 | Points | Place |
|---|---|---|---|---|---|---|---|---|---|---|
| 2019–20 | – | – | 3 | 1 | 2 | 2 | 6 | – | 1021 | 8th |
| 2020–21 | DNF | 1 | 1 | 2 | 1 | 6 | – | – | 1061 | 5th |
| 2021–22 | 1 | 1 | 2 | 1 | 6 | – | 1 | 3 | 1486 | 2nd |
| 2022–23 | 4 | 2 | 2 | 1 | 3 | 2 | 1 | 1 | 1697 | 1st |
| 2023–24 | 1 | 3 | 1 | 2 | 2 | 1 | 1 | 3 | 1720 | 1st |
| 2024–25 | 1 | 1 | 2 | 2 | 1 | | 1 | 1 | 1545 | 1st |
| 2025–26 | 1 | 1 | 1 | 3 | 1 | 3 | 1 | —N/a | 1525 | 1st |

==== Monobob ====
| Season | 1 | 2 | 3 | 4 | 5 | 6 | 7 | 8 | Points | Place |
|---|---|---|---|---|---|---|---|---|---|---|
| 2022–23 | 7 | 4 | 1 | 1 | 2 | 2 | 5 | 6 | 1590 | 2nd |
| 2023–24 | 5 | 3 | 8 | 2 | 6 | 3 | 1 | 4 | 1547 | 3rd |
| 2024–25 | 1 | 2 | 5 | 3 | 9 | 3 | 3 | 5 | 1555 | 3rd |
| 2025–26 | 1 | 2 | 3 | 2 | 1 | 6 | 3 | —N/a | 1446 | 1st |

== See also ==
- List of Youth Olympic Games gold medalists who won Olympic gold medals
