= Kira Lipperheide =

German bobsledder (born 2000)

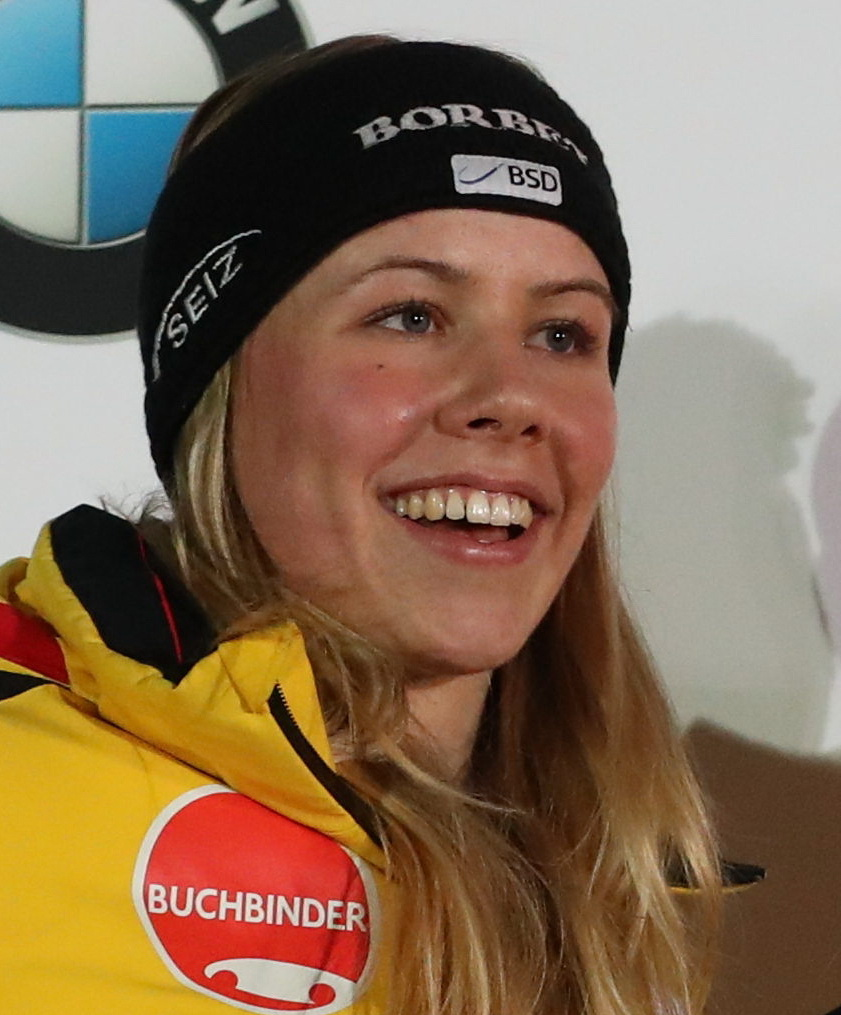
- Kira Lipperheide, February 2020

Personal information
- Nationality: German
- Born: 7 February 2000 (age 26)
- Height: 1.78 m (5 ft 10 in)
- Weight: 82 kg (181 lb)

Sport
- Country: Germany
- Sport: Bobsleigh
- Event: Two-women
Medal record
Women's bobsleigh
Representing Germany
World Championships
Silver medal – second place	2020 Alternberg	Two-woman
Silver medal – second place	2023 St. Moritz	Two-woman
Bronze medal – third place	2025 Lake Placid	Two-woman
European Championships
Silver medal – second place	2022 St. Moritz	Two-woman
Bronze medal – third place	2025 Lillehammer	Two-woman

Kira Lipperheide (born 7 February 2000) is a German bobsledder.

She won a medal at the IBSF World Championships 2020.

== World Championships results ==
Event	Two-woman	Monobob
(Germany) 2020 Altenberg	2nd	—N/a
(Switzerland) 2023 St. Moritz	2nd	
(United States) 2025 Lake Placid	3rd	
