= Taylor Lawrence =

British bobsledder (born 1996)

Personal information
- Nationality: British
- Born: 13 August 1996 (age 30)

Sport
- Sport: Bobsleigh
Medal record
Men's bobsleigh
Representing Great Britain
World Championships
Silver medal – second place	2023 St. Moritz	Four-man
Bronze medal – third place	2025 Lake Placid	Four-man
European Championships
Gold medal – first place	2023 Altenberg	Four-man
Bronze medal – third place	2025 Lillehammer	Two-man
Bronze medal – third place	2025 Lillehammer	Four-man
Bronze medal – third place	2026 St. Moritz	Two-man

Taylor Lawrence (born 13 August 1996) is a British bobsledder.

== Career ==
He was an amateur footballer, cricketer and rugby player alongside his career as a lance corporal in the Royal Marines. He first tried bobsled in 2019. After progressing to the British team, he was a member of the four-man crew which finished sixth in the 2022 Winter Olympics in Beijing.

He was a gold medalist with the British four-man team at the IBSF European Championships 2023 in Germany. He was a silver medalist in the Four-man bobsled at the IBSF World Championships 2023 in St Moritz, Switzerland. For the Great Britain team, it was a first four-man World Championships medal in 84 years.

He was a member of the Great Britain four-man bobsleigh team that won a bronze medal in the 2024–25 Bobsleigh World Cup, alongside Brad Hall, Leon Greenwood and Arran Gulliver. He also participated in six of the eight races in the two-man World Cup, in which the British team won bronze.

He won bronze medals in both the two-man, alongside Hall, and four-man at the IBSF European Championships 2025 in Lillehammer, Norway.

He was a bronze medalist in the four man at the IBSF World Championships 2025 in Lake Placid, United States.

Lawrence competed at the 2026 Winter Olympics in the two-man and four-man competitions, finishing 12th and 7th respectively. Lawrence sustained a minor injury during the two-man event that saw him replaced by Leon Greenwood for heats three and four, with Lawrence focussing on regaining his fitness for the four-man event.
