= Matthias Sommer =

German bobsledder (born 1991)

Personal information
- Nationality: German
- Born: 3 December 1991 (age 34) Witten, Germany

Sport
- Country: Germany
- Sport: Bobsleigh
Medal record
Men's bobsleigh
Representing Germany
Olympic Games
Silver medal – second place	2026 Milano Cortina	Four-man
Bronze medal – third place	2022 Beijing	Two-man
World Championships
Gold medal – first place	2025 Lake Placid	Four-man
European Championships
Silver medal – second place	2025 Lillehammer	Four-man

Matthias Sommer (born 3 December 1991) is a German bobsledder. He won a bronze medal at the 2022 Winter Olympics in the two-man bobsled.

== World Championships results ==
Event	Two-man	Four-man	Team
(Austria) 2016 Innsbruck		6th	
(Switzerland) 2023 St. Moritz	4th	6th	—N/a
(United States) 2025 Lake Placid		1st	—N/a
