= Florian Bauer =

German bobsledder (born 1994)

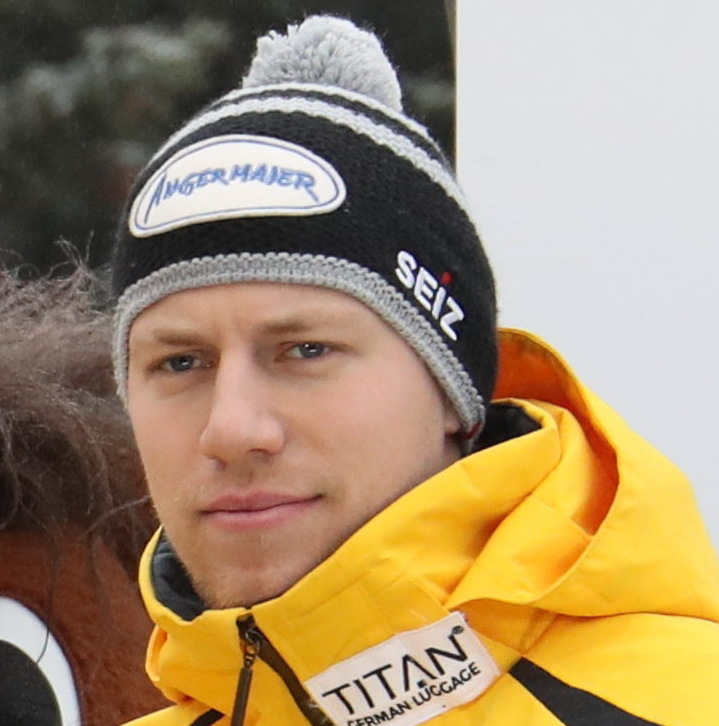
- Bauer in 2019

Personal information
- Nationality: German
- Born: 11 February 1994 (age 32) Töging am Inn, Germany
- Height: 1.90 m (6 ft 3 in)
- Weight: 100 kg (220 lb)

Sport
- Country: Germany
- Sport: Bobsleigh
- Event: Four-man
- Club: BRC Ohlstadt
Medal record
Men's bobsleigh
Representing Germany
Olympic Games
Silver medal – second place	2022 Beijing	Two-man
Silver medal – second place	2022 Beijing	Four-man
World Championships
Silver medal – second place	2020 Altenberg	Four-man
Silver medal – second place	2024 Winterberg	Four-man
Silver medal – second place	2025 Lake Placid	Four-man
Bronze medal – third place	2021 Altenberg	Four-man
European Championships
Gold medal – first place	2019 Königssee	Four-man
Gold medal – first place	2020 Winterberg	Four-man
Gold medal – first place	2025 Lillehammer	Four-man
Silver medal – second place	2022 St. Moritz	Two-man

Florian Bauer (born 11 February 1994) is a German bobsledder.

He won a medal at the IBSF World Championships 2020.

== World Championships results ==
Event	Two-man	Four-man	Team
(Canada) 2019 Whistler		9th	
(Germany) 2020 Altenberg		2nd	
(Germany) 2021 Altenberg		3rd	
(Germany) 2024 Winterberg		2nd	
(United States) 2025 Lake Placid		2nd	
