= IBSF World Championships 2023 =

Bobsleigh and skeleton championships

- Venue: St. Moritz-Celerina Olympic Bobrun
- Location: St. Moritz, Switzerland
- Dates: 26 January – 5 February

The 2023 IBSF World Championships were held in St. Moritz, Switzerland from 26 January to 5 February 2023. For the first time, para-bobsleigh events were included.

== Schedule ==
Eight events were held.

All times are local (UTC+1).

Bobsleigh

Date	Time	Events
28 January	09:00	Women's Monobub run 1 & 2
28 January	13:30	Two-man run 1 & 2
29 January	10:00	Women's Monobob run 3 & 4
29 January	13:15	Two-man run 3 & 4
2 February	09:00	Para-bobsleigh run 1 & 2
3 February	09:00	Para-bobsleigh run 3 & 4
3 February	13:00	Two-woman run 1 & 2
4 February	09:00	Two-woman run 3 & 4
4 February	13:00	Four-man run 1 & 2
5 February	13:00	Four-man run 3 & 4

Skeleton

Date	Time	Events
26 January	09:00	Men run 1 & 2
26 January	13:30	Women run 1 & 2
27 January	09:00	Men run 3 & 4
27 January	13:30	Women run 3 & 4
29 January	08:00	Skeleton mixed team

== Medal summary ==
=== Medal table ===
* Host nation (Switzerland)

Rank	Nation	Gold	Silver	Bronze	Total
1	Germany	6	2	1	9
2	Great Britain	1	2	1	4
3	Austria	1	0	0	1
4	Latvia	0	2	0	2
5	United States	0	1	1	2
6	Italy	0	1	0	1
6	Netherlands	0	1	0	1
8	Switzerland*	0	0	2	2
9	Canada	0	0	1	1
9	South Korea	0	0	1	1
Totals (10 entries)		8	9	7	24

=== Bobsleigh ===
Event	Gold		Silver		Bronze	
Two-man	Germany; Johannes Lochner; Georg Fleischhauer	4:21.84	Germany; Francesco Friedrich; Alexander Schüller	4:22.33	Switzerland; Michael Vogt; Sandro Michel	4:22.34
Four-man	Germany; Francesco Friedrich; Thorsten Margis; Arndt Bauer; Alexander Schüller	4:19.61	Great Britain; Brad Hall; Arran Gulliver; Taylor Lawrence; Greg Cackett; Latvia; Emīls Cipulis; Edgars Nemme; Davis Springis; Matīss Miknis	4:20.30	not awarded	
Women’s Monobob	Laura Nolte; Germany	4:44.85	Kaillie Humphries; United States	4:45.25	Lisa Buckwitz; Germany	4:45.57
Two-woman	Germany; Kim Kalicki; Leonie Fiebig	4:32.86	Germany; Lisa Buckwitz; Kira Lipperheide	4:32.91	United States; Kaillie Humphries; Kaysha Love	4:33.37

=== Para-bobsleigh ===
Event	Gold		Silver		Bronze	
Para-bobsleigh	Hermann Ellmauer; Austria	4:53.62	Artūrs Klots; Latvia	4:53.70	Christopher Stewart; Switzerland	4:53.90

=== Skeleton ===
Event	Gold		Silver		Bronze	
Men	Matt Weston; Great Britain	4:28.71	Amedeo Bagnis; Italy	4:30.50	Jung Seung-gi; South Korea	4:31.17
Women	Susanne Kreher; Germany	4:33.57	Kimberley Bos; Netherlands	4:33.58	Mirela Rahneva; Canada	4:34.41
Skeleton mixed team	Germany; Susanne Kreher; Christopher Grotheer	2:24.91	Great Britain; Laura Deas; Matt Weston	2:25.04	Great Britain; Brogan Crowley; Craig Thompson	2:25.32

== See also ==
- IBSF European Championships 2023
- IBSF Junior World Championships 2023
