= 2025–26 Bobsleigh World Cup =

Bobsleigh championship season

Discipline	Men	Women
Combined	(Germany) Johannes Lochner (2)	(Germany) Laura Nolte (3)
Monobob	—	(Germany) Laura Nolte (1)
Two	(Germany) Johannes Lochner (3)	(Germany) Laura Nolte (4)
Four	(Germany) Johannes Lochner (2)	—

Competition
Edition	42nd	33rd
Locations	7	7
Cancelled	–	–
Rescheduled	–	–

The 2025–26 Bobsleigh World Cup (official: BMW IBSF Bobsleigh World Cup) was a multi-race series over a season of bobsleigh, organised by International Bobsleigh and Skeleton Federation (IBSF).

The season started on 22 November 2025 in Cortina d'Ampezzo, Italy and concluded on 18 January 2026 in Altenberg, Germany.

The highlight of the season was the 2026 Winter Olympics in Cortina d'Ampezzo, whose results were not included in the World Cup standings.

== Schedule ==
No	Location	Date	Two-Man	Four-Man	Monobob	Two-Woman	Details
1	(Italy) Cortina d'Ampezzo	22–23 November 2025	●	●	●	●	
2	(Austria) Innsbruck	29–30 November 2025	●	●	●	●	
3	(Norway) Lillehammer	13–14 December 2025		●●	●	●	
4	(Latvia) Sigulda	20–21 December 2025	●●		●	●	
5	(Germany) Winterberg	3–4 January 2026	●	●	●	●	
6	(Switzerland) St. Moritz	10–11 January 2026	●	●	●	●	also European Championships
7	(Germany) Altenberg	17–18 January 2026	●	●	●	●	
OG	(Italy) Cortina d'Ampezzo	15–22 February 2026	●	●	●	●	2026 Winter Olympics (not included in the World Cup)

== Men's calendar & standings ==
=== Two-man ===
No.	Date	Place	Winner	Time	Second	Time	Third	Time	R.
1	22 Nov 2025	(Italy) Cortina d'Ampezzo	Germany; Johannes Lochner; Georg Fleischhauer	1:51.15 (55.50 / 55.65)	Germany; Francesco Friedrich; Alexander Schüller	1:51.49 (55.73 / 55.76)	Germany; Adam Ammour; Alexander Schaller	1:51.75 (55.89 / 55.86)	
2	29 Nov 2025	(Austria) Innsbruck	Germany; Johannes Lochner; Georg Fleischhauer	1:45.08 (52.64 / 52.44)	Germany; Francesco Friedrich; Alexander Schaller	1:45.13 (52.67 / 52.46)	Germany; Adam Ammour; Tim Becker	1:45.89 (53.07 / 52.82)	
3	20 Dec 2025	(Latvia) Sigulda	Germany; Francesco Friedrich; Alexander Schüller	1:38.97 (49.34 / 49.63)	Germany; Johannes Lochner; Thorsten Margis	1:39.20 (49.49 / 49.71)	Germany; Adam Ammour; Benedikt Hertel	1:39.39 (49.52 / 49.87)	
4	21 Dec 2025	(Latvia) Sigulda	Germany; Johannes Lochner; Georg Fleischhauer	1:38.84 (49.40 / 49.44)	Germany; Francesco Friedrich; Alexander Schüller/ Tim Becker	1:39.37 (49.67 / 49.70)	Germany; Adam Ammour; Joshua Tasche	1:39.66 (49.95 / 49.71)	
5	3 Jan 2026	(Germany) Winterberg	Germany; Johannes Lochner; Georg Fleischhauer	1:49.81 (54.88 / 54.93)	Germany; Adam Ammour; Alexander Schaller	1:50.11 (55.24 / 54.87)	Germany; Francesco Friedrich; Alexander Schüller	1:50.32 (55.08 / 55.24)	
6	10 Jan 2026	(Switzerland) St. Moritz	Germany; Johannes Lochner; Georg Fleischhauer	2:12.24 (1:06.28 / 1:05.96)	Germany; Francesco Friedrich; Alexander Schüller	2:13.02 (1:06.71 / 1:06.31)	Great Britain; Brad Hall; Taylor Lawrence	2:13.43 (1:06.76 / 1:06.71)	
7	17 Jan 2026	(Germany) Altenberg	Germany; Johannes Lochner; Georg Fleischhauer	1:50.13 (55.08 / 55.05)	Germany; Adam Ammour; Benedikt Hertel	1:50.58 (55.19 / 55.39)	Germany; Francesco Friedrich; Alexander Schüller	1:50.64 (55.49 / 55.15)	
Overall			Germany; Johannes Lochner		Germany; Francesco Friedrich		Germany; Adam Ammour		

==== Overall leaders ====
Holder	Date	Place(s)	Number of competitions
(Germany) Johannes Lochner	22 November 2025 – 17 January 2026	(Italy) Cortina d'Ampezzo – (Germany) Altenberg	7

==== Standings ====
Rank	Racer	Points	(Italy) COR	(Austria) IGL	(Latvia) SIG1	(Latvia) SIG2	(Germany) WIN	(Switzerland) STM	(Germany) ALT
1	(Germany) Johannes Lochner	1560	1	1	2	1	1	1	1
2	(Germany) Francesco Friedrich	1465	2	2	1	2	3	2	3
3	(Germany) Adam Ammour	1396	3	3	3	3	2	6	2
4	(United States) Frank Del Duca	1264	5	4	5	6	5	7	6
5	(South Korea) Kim Jin-su	1248	4	4	10	8	6	4	4
6	(United Kingdom) Brad Hall	1056	6	17	12	7	14	3	5
7	(Austria) Markus Treichl	1032	10	9	6	9	10	13	10
8	(Switzerland) Michael Vogt	1008	9	12	4	4	8	5	-
9	(Italy) Patrick Baumgartner	928	7	16	8	5	22	12	11
10	(Latvia) Jēkabs Kalenda	912	13	8	7	13	18	10	13

=== Four-man ===
No.	Date	Place	Winner	Time	Second	Time	Third	Time	R.
1	23 Nov 2025	(Italy) Cortina d'Ampezzo	Germany; Johannes Lochner; Thorsten Margis; Jörn Wenzel; Georg Fleischhauer	1:49.73 (54.75 / 54.98)	Germany; Francesco Friedrich; Matthias Sommer; Alexander Schüller; Felix Straub	1:49.95 (54.93 / 55.02)	South Korea; Kim Jin-su; Kim Sun-wook; Kim Hyeong-geun; Lee Geon-u	1:50.34 (55.14 / 55.20)	
2	30 Nov 2025	(Austria) Innsbruck	Germany; Francesco Friedrich; Tim Becker; Alexander Schüller; Felix Straub	1:43.68 (51.67 / 52.01)	Germany; Johannes Lochner; Thorsten Margis; Jörn Wenzel; Georg Fleischhauer	1:43.96 (52.04 / 51.92)	Italy; Patrick Baumgartner; Eric Fantazzini; Robert Mircea; Lorenzo Bilotti	1:44.15 (52.00 / 52.15)	
3	13 Dec 2025	(Norway) Lillehammer	Germany; Johannes Lochner; Thorsten Margis; Jörn Wenzel; Georg Fleischhauer	1:39.88 (49.81 / 50.07)	Germany; Francesco Friedrich; Matthias Sommer; Alexander Schüller; Felix Straub	1:40.02 (49.77 / 50.25)	Germany; Adam Ammour; Issam Ammour; Joshua Tasche; Alexander Schaller	1:40.04 (49.89 / 50.15)	
4	14 Dec 2025	(Norway) Lillehammer	Germany; Johannes Lochner; Thorsten Margis; Oliver Peschk; Georg Fleischhauer	1:40.01 (49.80 / 50.21)	Germany; Adam Ammour; Issam Ammour; Joshua Tasche; Costa Laurenz	1:40.27 (50.08 / 50.19)	Germany; Francesco Friedrich; Alexander Schaller; Alexander Schüller; Felix Straub	1:40.29 (50.02 / 50.27)	
5	4 Jan 2026	(Germany) Winterberg	Germany; Francesco Friedrich; Matthias Sommer; Alexander Schüller; Costa Laurenz	1:49.07 (54.47 / 54.60)	Germany; Johannes Lochner; Oliver Peschk; Jörn Wenzel; Georg Fleischhauer	1:49.09 (54.56 / 54.53)	Germany; Adam Ammour; Issam Ammour; Joshua Tasche; Alexander Schaller	1:49.13 (54.61 / 54.52)	
6	11 Jan 2026	(Switzerland) St. Moritz	Germany; Adam Ammour; Issam Ammour; Joshua Tasche; Alexander Schaller	2:09.51 (1:05.04 / 1:04.47)	Germany; Johannes Lochner; Thorsten Margis; Jörn Wenzel; Georg Fleischhauer	2:09.58 (1:04.95 / 1:04.63)	Switzerland; Michael Vogt; Dominik Hufschmid; Andreas Haas; Amadou David Ndiaye	2:10.06 (1:05.25 / 1:04.81)	
7	18 Jan 2026	(Germany) Altenberg	Germany; Adam Ammour; Issam Ammour; Joshua Tasche; Alexander Schaller	1:49.13 (54.78 / 54.35)	Germany; Johannes Lochner; Thorsten Margis; Jörn Wenzel; Georg Fleischhauer	1:49.15 (54.59 / 54.56)	Germany; Francesco Friedrich; Matthias Sommer; Alexander Schüller; Felix Straub	1:49.28 (54.64 / 54.64)	
Overall			Germany; Johannes Lochner		Germany; Francesco Friedrich		Germany; Adam Ammour		

==== Overall leaders ====
Holder	Date	Place(s)	Number of competitions
(Germany) Johannes Lochner	23 November 2025	(Italy) Cortina d'Ampezzo	1
(Germany) Francesco Friedrich	30 November 2025	(Austria) Innsbruck	1
(Germany) Johannes Lochner	13 December 2025 – 18 January 2026	(Norway) Lillehammer – (Germany) Altenberg	5

==== Standings ====
Rank	Racer	Points	(Italy) COR	(Austria) IGL	(Norway) LIL1	(Norway) LIL2	(Germany) WIN	(Switzerland) STM	(Germany) ALT
1	(Germany) Johannes Lochner	1515	1	2	1	1	2	2	2
2	(Germany) Francesco Friedrich	1446	2	1	2	3	1	6	3
3	(Germany) Adam Ammour	1436	5	4	3	2	3	1	1
4	(United Kingdom) Brad Hall	1224	6	10	6	5	4	8	4
5	(Austria) Markus Treichl	1200	4	5	14	9	5	4	5
6	(Italy) Patrick Baumgartner	1104	8	3	4	4	7	4	0
7	(Switzerland) Cédric Follador	1072	9	9	8	15	6	7	8
8	(South Korea) Kim Jin-su	1018	3	7	6	14	10	23	7
9	(Switzerland) Michael Vogt	968	10	6	5	8	15	3	-
10	(Canada) Taylor Austin	941	11	24	11	7	9	12	6

=== Men's combined standings ===
Rank	after all 14 events	Points
1	(Germany) Johannes Lochner	3075
2	(Germany) Francesco Friedrich	2911
3	(Germany) Adam Ammour	2832
4	(United Kingdom) Brad Hall	2280
5	(South Korea) Kim Jin-su	2266
6	(Austria) Markus Treichl	2232
7	(Italy) Patrick Baumgartner	2032
8	(Switzerland) Michael Vogt	1976
9	(Switzerland) Cédric Follador	1946
10	(United States) Frank Del Duca	1742

== Women's calendar & standings ==
=== Monobob ===
No.	Date	Place	Winner	Time	Second	Time	Third	Time	R.
1	22 Nov 2025	(Italy) Cortina d'Ampezzo	(Germany) Laura Nolte	1:59.47 (59.80 / 59.67)	(United States) Kaysha Love	1:59.62 (59.74 / 59.88)	(Australia) Breeana Walker	1:59.63 (59.85 / 59.78)	
2	29 Nov 2025	(Austria) Innsbruck	(United States) Kaysha Love	1:52.02 (56.05 / 55.97)	(Germany) Laura Nolte	1:52.19 (56.14 / 56.05)	(Germany) Lisa Buckwitz	1:52.33 (56.22 / 56.11)	
3	13 Dec 2025	(Norway) Lillehammer	(Australia) Breeana Walker	1:47.88 (53.86 / 54.02)	(Austria) Katrin Beierl	1:48.32 (54.14 / 54.18)	(Germany) Laura Nolte	1:48.36 (54.11 / 54.25)	
4	20 Dec 2025	(Latvia) Sigulda	(Australia) Breeana Walker	1:46.48 (53.12 / 53.36)	(Germany) Laura Nolte	1:46.59 (53.13 / 53.46)	(Austria) Katrin Beierl	1:46.62 (53.05 / 53.57)	
5	3 Jan 2026	(Germany) Winterberg	(Germany) Laura Nolte	1:58.37 (58.90 / 59.47)	(Canada) Cynthia Appiah	1:58.53 (59.15 / 59.38)	(Germany) Lisa Buckwitz	1:58.57 (58.86 / 59.71)	
6	10 Jan 2026	(Switzerland) St. Moritz	(Australia) Breeana Walker	2:23.27 (1:11.98 / 1:11.29)	(Switzerland) Melanie Hasler	2:23.80 (1:21.21 / 1:11.59)	(Austria) Katrin Beierl	2:23.95 (1:12.46 / 1:11.49)	
7	17 Jan 2026	(Germany) Altenberg	(United States) Kaillie Humphries	1:58.97 (59.43 / 59.54)	(Australia) Breeana Walker	1:59.10 (59.50 / 59.60)	(Germany) Laura Nolte	1:59.16 (59.47 / 59.69)	
Overall			(Germany) Laura Nolte		(Australia) Breeana Walker		(Germany) Lisa Buckwitz		

==== Overall leaders ====
Holder	Date	Place(s)	Number of competitions
(Germany) Laura Nolte	22 November 2025	(Italy) Cortina d'Ampezzo	1
(Germany) Laura Nolte (United States) Kaysha Love	29 November 2025	(Austria) Innsbruck	1
(Germany) Laura Nolte	13 December 2025 – 17 January 2026	(Norway) Lillehammer – (Germany) Altenberg	5

==== Standings ====
Rank	Racer	Points	(Italy) COR	(Austria) IGL	(Norway) LIL	(Latvia) SIG	(Germany) WIN	(Switzerland) STM	(Germany) ALT
1	(Germany) Laura Nolte	1446	1	2	3	2	1	6	3
2	(Australia) Breeana Walker	1429	3	4	1	1	9	1	2
3	(Germany) Lisa Buckwitz	1320	5	3	5	4	3	7	4
4	(United States) Kaillie Humphries	1289	4	9	7	6	5	4	1
5	(Austria) Katrin Beierl	1234	12	13	2	3	4	3	5
6	(Canada) Melissa Lotholz	1152	6	5	6	18	6	5	6
7	(Canada) Cynthia Appiah	1058	13	14	8	8	2	11	8
8	(Switzerland) Melanie Hasler	1058	7	7	4	6	10	2	-
9	(United States) Kaysha Love	1051	2	1	14	10	8	14	17
10	(United States) Elana Meyers Taylor	1026	8	12	11	9	6	9	9

=== Two-woman ===
No.	Date	Place	Winner	Time	Second	Time	Third	Time	R.
1	23 Nov 2025	(Italy) Cortina d'Ampezzo	Germany; Laura Nolte; Deborah Levi	1:54.23 (56.98 / 57.25)	United States; Kaysha Love; Azaria Hill	1:55.00 (57.52 / 57.48)	United States; Kaillie Humphries; Sylvia Hoffman	1:55.02 (57.49 / 57.53)	
2	30 Nov 2025	(Austria) Innsbruck	Germany; Laura Nolte; Deborah Levi	1:47.51 (53.78 / 53.73)	United States; Kaysha Love; Sylvia Hoffman	1:47.92 (54.12 / 53.80)	Germany; Kim Kalicki; Leonie Fiebig	1:48.03 (54.07 / 53.96)	
3	14 Dec 2025	(Norway) Lillehammer	Germany; Laura Nolte; Deborah Levi	1:43.49 (51.72 / 51.77)	Germany; Kim Kalicki; Talea Prepens	1:44.05 (51.98 / 52.07)	Germany; Lisa Buckwitz; Kira Lipperheide/ Neele Schuten	1:44.11 (52.01 / 52.10)	
4	21 Dec 2025	(Latvia) Sigulda	United States; Kaillie Humphries; Emily Renna	1:42.80 (51.46 / 51.34)	Germany; Lisa Buckwitz; Lauryn Siebert	1:43.07 (51.44 / 51.63)	Germany; Laura Nolte; Leonie Kluwig	1:43.08 (51.49 / 51.59)	
5	4 Jan 2026	(Germany) Winterberg	Germany; Laura Nolte; Deborah Levi	1:53.63 (57.11 / 56.52)	Germany; Lisa Buckwitz; Kira Lipperheide	1:53.79 (57.00 / 56.79)	Germany; Kim Kalicki; Leonie Fiebig/ Talea Prepens	1:54.29 (57.29 / 57.00)	
6	11 Jan 2026	(Switzerland) St. Moritz	United States; Kaillie Humphries; Emily Renna	2:18.40 (1:09.55 / 1:08.85)	Switzerland; Melanie Hasler; Nadja Pasternack	2:18.41 (1:09.63 / 1:08.78)	Germany; Laura Nolte; Leonie Kluwig	2:18.43 (1:09.82 / 1:08.61)	
7	18 Jan 2026	(Germany) Altenberg	Germany; Laura Nolte; Deborah Levi	1:52.33 (55.96 / 56.37)	United States; Kaillie Humphries; Jasmine Jones	1:53.23 (56.35 / 56.88)	Germany; Kim Kalicki; Lauryn Siebert	1:53.39 (56.59 / 56.80)	
Overall			Germany; Laura Nolte		United States; Kaillie Humphries		Germany; Kim Kalicki		

==== Overall leaders ====
Holder	Date	Place(s)	Number of competitions
(Germany) Laura Nolte	23 November 2025 – 18 January 2026	(Italy) Cortina d'Ampezzo – (Germany) Altenberg	7

==== Standings ====
Rank	Racer	Points	(Italy) COR	(Austria) IGL	(Norway) LIL	(Latvia) SIG	(Germany) WIN	(Switzerland) STM	(Germany) ALT
1	(Germany) Laura Nolte	1525	1	1	1	3	1	3	1
2	(United States) Kaillie Humphries	1428	3	4	5	1	4	1	2
3	(Germany) Kim Kalicki	1370	4	3	2	6	3	4	3
4	(Germany) Lisa Buckwitz	1332	7	5	3	2	2	5	6
5	(Austria) Katrin Beierl	1216	5	7	7	10	5	6	4
6	(United States) Elana Meyers Taylor	1168	6	6	9	4	8	10	7
7	(Switzerland) Melanie Hasler	1050	8	9	8	5	5	2	–
8	(United States) Kaysha Love	1036	2	2	4	13	10	8	–
9	(Switzerland) Debora Annen	920	12	13	6	–	7	7	8
10	(France) Margot Boch	920	14	10	14	14	9	11	9

=== Women's combined standings ===
Rank	after all 14 events	Points
1	(Germany) Laura Nolte	2971
2	(United States) Kaillie Humphries	2717
3	(Germany) Lisa Buckwitz	2652
4	(Austria) Katrin Beierl	2450
5	(United States) Elana Meyers Taylor	2194
6	(Germany) Kim Kalicki	2178
7	(Switzerland) Melanie Hasler	2108
8	(United States) Kaysha Love	2087
9	(Canada) Cynthia Appiah	1962
10	(Canada) Melissa Lotholz	1944

== Podium table by nation ==
Table showing the World Cup podium places (gold–1st place, silver–2nd place, bronze–3rd place) by the countries represented by the athletes.

Rank	Nation	Gold	Silver	Bronze	Total
1	Germany	21	19	20	60
2	United States	4	4	1	9
3	Australia	3	1	1	5
4	Switzerland	0	2	1	3
5	Austria	0	1	2	3
6	Canada	0	1	0	1
7	Great Britain	0	0	1	1
7	Italy	0	0	1	1
7	South Korea	0	0	1	1
Totals (9 entries)		28	28	28	84

== Points distribution ==
The table shows the number of points won in the 2025–26 Bobsleigh World Cup for men and women.

Place	1	2	3	4	5	6	7	8	9	10	11	12	13	14	15	16	17	18	19	20
2-Man, 4-Man, Monobob, 2-Woman	225	210	200	192	184	176	168	160	152	144	136	128	120	112	104	96	88	80	74	68

== Retirements ==
The following notable bobsleigh athletes, who competed in the World Cup, are expected to retire during or after the 2025–26 season:

Men

- (Brazil) Edson Bindilatti
- (Switzerland) Cédric Follador

Women

== See also ==
- 2025–26 Skeleton World Cup
