= List of 2026 Winter Olympics medal winners =

The 2026 Winter Olympics were held at sites across Lombardy and Northeast Italy, between 6–22 February 2026. The Games officially opened on 6 February with preliminary events beginning on 4 February.

== Alpine skiing ==
=== Men's events ===
Event	Gold	Silver	Bronze
Downhill	Franjo von Allmen; Switzerland	Giovanni Franzoni; Italy	Dominik Paris; Italy
Super-G	Franjo von Allmen; Switzerland	Ryan Cochran-Siegle; United States	Marco Odermatt; Switzerland
Giant slalom	Lucas Pinheiro Braathen; Brazil	Marco Odermatt; Switzerland	Loïc Meillard; Switzerland
Slalom	Loïc Meillard; Switzerland	Fabio Gstrein; Austria	Henrik Kristoffersen; Norway
Team combined	Switzerland; Franjo von Allmen; Tanguy Nef	Austria; Vincent Kriechmayr; Manuel Feller; Switzerland; Marco Odermatt; Loïc Meillard	Not awarded

=== Women's events ===
Event	Gold	Silver	Bronze
Downhill	Breezy Johnson; United States	Emma Aicher; Germany	Sofia Goggia; Italy
Super-G	Federica Brignone; Italy	Romane Miradoli; France	Cornelia Hütter; Austria
Giant slalom	Federica Brignone; Italy	Thea Louise Stjernesund; Norway; Sara Hector; Sweden	Not awarded
Slalom	Mikaela Shiffrin; United States	Camille Rast; Switzerland	Anna Swenn-Larsson; Sweden
Team combined	Austria; Ariane Rädler; Katharina Huber	Germany; Kira Weidle-Winkelmann; Emma Aicher	United States; Jacqueline Wiles; Paula Moltzan

== Biathlon ==
=== Men's events ===
Event	Gold	Silver	Bronze
Individual	Johan-Olav Botn; Norway	Éric Perrot; France	Sturla Holm Lægreid; Norway
Sprint	Quentin Fillon Maillet; France	Vetle Sjåstad Christiansen; Norway	Sturla Holm Lægreid; Norway
Pursuit	Martin Ponsiluoma; Sweden	Sturla Holm Lægreid; Norway	Émilien Jacquelin; France
Mass start	Johannes Dale-Skjevdal; Norway	Sturla Holm Lægreid; Norway	Quentin Fillon Maillet; France
Relay	France; Fabien Claude; Émilien Jacquelin; Quentin Fillon Maillet; Éric Perrot	Norway; Martin Uldal; Johan-Olav Botn; Sturla Holm Lægreid; Vetle Sjåstad Christiansen	Sweden; Viktor Brandt; Jesper Nelin; Martin Ponsiluoma; Sebastian Samuelsson

=== Women's events ===
Event	Gold	Silver	Bronze
Individual	Julia Simon; France	Lou Jeanmonnot; France	Lora Hristova; Bulgaria
Sprint	Maren Kirkeeide; Norway	Océane Michelon; France	Lou Jeanmonnot; France
Pursuit	Lisa Vittozzi; Italy	Maren Kirkeeide; Norway	Suvi Minkkinen; Finland
Mass start	Océane Michelon; France	Julia Simon; France	Tereza Voborníková; Czech Republic
Relay	France; Camille Bened; Lou Jeanmonnot; Océane Michelon; Julia Simon	Sweden; Linn Gestblom; Anna Magnusson; Elvira Öberg; Hanna Öberg	Norway; Marthe Kråkstad Johansen; Juni Arnekleiv; Karoline Offigstad Knotten; Maren Kirkeeide

=== Mixed event ===
Event	Gold	Silver	Bronze
Relay	France; Éric Perrot; Quentin Fillon Maillet; Lou Jeanmonnot; Julia Simon	Italy; Tommaso Giacomel; Lukas Hofer; Dorothea Wierer; Lisa Vittozzi	Germany; Justus Strelow; Philipp Nawrath; Vanessa Voigt; Franziska Preuß

== Bobsleigh ==
Event	Gold	Silver	Bronze
Two-man	Germany; Johannes Lochner; Georg Fleischhauer	Germany; Francesco Friedrich; Alexander Schüller	Germany; Adam Ammour; Alexander Schaller
Four-man	Germany; Johannes Lochner; Thorsten Margis; Jörn Wenzel; Georg Fleischhauer	Germany; Francesco Friedrich; Matthias Sommer; Alexander Schüller; Felix Straub	Switzerland; Michael Vogt; Andreas Haas; Amadou David Ndiaye; Mario Aeberhard
Women's monobob	Elana Meyers Taylor; United States	Laura Nolte; Germany	Kaillie Humphries; United States
Two-woman	Germany; Laura Nolte; Deborah Levi	Germany; Lisa Buckwitz; Neele Schuten	United States; Kaillie Humphries; Jasmine Jones

== Cross-country skiing ==
=== Men's events ===
Event	Gold	Silver	Bronze
10 kilometre freestyle	Johannes Høsflot Klæbo; Norway	Mathis Desloges; France	Einar Hedegart; Norway
20 kilometre skiathlon	Johannes Høsflot Klæbo; Norway	Mathis Desloges; France	Martin Løwstrøm Nyenget; Norway
50 kilometre classical	Johannes Høsflot Klæbo; Norway	Martin Løwstrøm Nyenget; Norway	Emil Iversen; Norway
4 × 7.5 kilometre relay	Norway; Emil Iversen; Martin Løwstrøm Nyenget; Einar Hedegart; Johannes Høsflot Klæbo	France; Théo Schely; Hugo Lapalus; Mathis Desloges; Victor Lovera	Italy; Davide Graz; Elia Barp; Martino Carollo; Federico Pellegrino
Sprint classical	Johannes Høsflot Klæbo; Norway	Ben Ogden; United States	Oskar Opstad Vike; Norway
Team sprint freestyle	Norway; Einar Hedegart; Johannes Høsflot Klæbo	United States; Ben Ogden; Gus Schumacher	Italy; Elia Barp; Federico Pellegrino

=== Women's events ===
Event	Gold	Silver	Bronze
10 kilometre freestyle	Frida Karlsson; Sweden	Ebba Andersson; Sweden	Jessie Diggins; United States
20 kilometre skiathlon	Frida Karlsson; Sweden	Ebba Andersson; Sweden	Heidi Weng; Norway
50 kilometre classical	Ebba Andersson; Sweden	Heidi Weng; Norway	Nadja Kälin; Switzerland
4 × 7.5 kilometre relay	Norway; Kristin Austgulen Fosnæs; Astrid Øyre Slind; Karoline Simpson-Larsen; Heidi Weng	Sweden; Linn Svahn; Ebba Andersson; Frida Karlsson; Jonna Sundling	Finland; Johanna Matintalo; Kerttu Niskanen; Vilma Ryytty; Jasmi Joensuu
Sprint classical	Linn Svahn; Sweden	Jonna Sundling; Sweden	Maja Dahlqvist; Sweden
Team sprint freestyle	Sweden; Maja Dahlqvist; Jonna Sundling	Switzerland; Nadja Kälin; Nadine Fähndrich	Germany; Laura Gimmler; Coletta Rydzek

== Curling ==
Event	Gold	Silver	Bronze
Men	Canada; Brad Jacobs; Marc Kennedy; Brett Gallant; Ben Hebert; Tyler Tardi	Great Britain; Bruce Mouat; Grant Hardie; Bobby Lammie; Hammy McMillan Jr. Kyle Waddell	Switzerland; Benoît Schwarz-van Berkel; Yannick Schwaller; Sven Michel; Pablo Lachat-Couchepin; Kim Schwaller
Women	Sweden; Anna Hasselborg; Sara McManus; Agnes Knochenhauer; Sofia Scharback; Johanna Heldin	Switzerland; Alina Pätz; Silvana Tirinzoni; Carole Howald; Selina Witschonke; Stefanie Berset	Canada; Rachel Homan; Tracy Fleury; Emma Miskew; Sarah Wilkes; Rachelle Brown
Mixed doubles	Sweden; Isabella Wranå; Rasmus Wranå	United States; Cory Thiesse; Korey Dropkin	Italy; Stefania Constantini; Amos Mosaner

== Figure skating ==
Event	Gold	Silver	Bronze
Men's singles	Mikhail Shaidorov; Kazakhstan	Yuma Kagiyama; Japan	Shun Sato; Japan
Women's singles	Alysa Liu; United States	Kaori Sakamoto; Japan	Ami Nakai; Japan
Pair skating	Japan; Riku Miura; Ryuichi Kihara	Georgia; Anastasiia Metelkina; Luka Berulava	Germany; Minerva Fabienne Hase; Nikita Volodin
Ice dance	France; Laurence Fournier Beaudry; Guillaume Cizeron	United States; Madison Chock; Evan Bates	Canada; Piper Gilles; Paul Poirier
Team event	United States; Ilia Malinin; Alysa Liu; Amber Glenn; Ellie Kam; Daniel O'Shea; Evan Bates; Madison Chock	Japan; Yuma Kagiyama; Shun Sato; Kaori Sakamoto; Ryuichi Kihara; Riku Miura; Masaya Morita; Utana Yoshida	Italy; Daniel Grassl; Matteo Rizzo; Lara Naki Gutmann; Sara Conti; Niccolò Macii; Charlène Guignard; Marco Fabbri

== Freestyle skiing ==
=== Men's events ===
Event	Gold	Silver	Bronze
Aerials	Wang Xindi; China	Noé Roth; Switzerland	Li Tianma; China
Big air	Tormod Frostad; Norway	Mac Forehand; United States	Matěj Švancer; Austria
Halfpipe	Alex Ferreira; United States	Henry Sildaru; Estonia	Brendan Mackay; Canada
Slopestyle	Birk Ruud; Norway	Alex Hall; United States	Luca Harrington; New Zealand
Moguls	Cooper Woods-Topalovic; Australia	Mikaël Kingsbury; Canada	Ikuma Horishima; Japan
Dual moguls	Mikaël Kingsbury; Canada	Ikuma Horishima; Japan	Matt Graham; Australia
Ski cross	Simone Deromedis; Italy	Federico Tomasoni; Italy	Alex Fiva; Switzerland

=== Women's events ===
Event	Gold	Silver	Bronze
Aerials	Xu Mengtao; China	Danielle Scott; Australia	Shao Qi; China
Big air	Megan Oldham; Canada	Eileen Gu; China	Flora Tabanelli; Italy
Halfpipe	Eileen Gu; China	Li Fanghui; China	Zoe Atkin; Great Britain
Slopestyle	Mathilde Gremaud; Switzerland	Eileen Gu; China	Megan Oldham; Canada
Moguls	Elizabeth Lemley; United States	Jaelin Kauf; United States	Perrine Laffont; France
Dual moguls	Jakara Anthony; Australia	Jaelin Kauf; United States	Elizabeth Lemley; United States
Ski cross	Daniela Maier; Germany	Fanny Smith; Switzerland	Sandra Näslund; Sweden

=== Mixed event ===
Event	Gold	Silver	Bronze
Team aerials	United States; Kaila Kuhn; Connor Curran; Christopher Lillis	Switzerland; Lina Kozomara; Pirmin Werner; Noé Roth	China; Xu Mengtao; Wang Xindi; Li Tianma

== Ice hockey ==
Event	Gold	Silver	Bronze
Men's tournament	United States; Jake Oettinger; Connor Hellebuyck; Charlie McAvoy; Quinn Hughes; Brady Tkachuk; Jack Eichel; Matthew Tkachuk; Brock Faber; Jaccob Slavin; Matt Boldy; Auston Matthews; Jake Guentzel; Zach Werenski; Jake Sanderson; Dylan Larkin; Tage Thompson; Jack Hughes; Noah Hanifin; JT Miller; Vincent Trocheck; Brock Nelson; Clayton Keller; Jeremy Swayman; Jackson LaCombe; Kyle Connor	Canada; Logan Thompson; Jordan Binnington; Devon Toews; Cale Makar; Macklin Celebrini; Nathan MacKinnon; Connor McDavid; Thomas Harley; Colton Parayko; Nick Suzuki; Mark Stone; Mitch Marner; Travis Sanheim; Drew Doughty; Sam Bennett; Tom Wilson; Brad Marchand; Shea Theodore; Bo Horvat; Seth Jarvis; Brandon Hagel; Sam Reinhart; Darcy Kuemper; Josh Morrissey; Sidney Crosby	Finland; Sebastian Aho; Joel Armia; Mikael Granlund; Miro Heiskanen; Roope Hintz; Erik Haula; Henri Jokiharju; Kaapo Kakko; Oliver Kapanen; Joel Kiviranta; Joonas Korpisalo; Kevin Lankinen; Artturi Lehkonen; Mikko Lehtonen; Esa Lindell; Anton Lundell; Eetu Luostarinen; Olli Määttä; Nikolas Matinpalo; Niko Mikkola; Mikko Rantanen; Rasmus Ristolainen; Juuse Saros; Teuvo Teräväinen; Eeli Tolvanen
Women's tournament	United States; Cayla Barnes; Hannah Bilka; Alex Carpenter; Kendall Coyne Schofield; Britta Curl-Salemme; Joy Dunne; Laila Edwards; Aerin Frankel; Rory Guilday; Caroline Harvey; Taylor Heise; Tessa Janecke; Megan Keller; Hilary Knight; Ava McNaughton; Abbey Murphy; Kelly Pannek; Gwyneth Philips; Hayley Scamurra; Kirsten Simms; Lee Stecklein; Haley Winn; Grace Zumwinkle	Canada; Erin Ambrose; Emily Clark; Ann-Renée Desbiens; Renata Fast; Sarah Fillier; Jenn Gardiner; Julia Gosling; Sophie Jaques; Brianne Jenner; Jocelyne Larocque; Emma Maltais; Emerance Maschmeyer; Sarah Nurse; Kristin O'Neill; Kayle Osborne; Marie-Philip Poulin; Ella Shelton; Natalie Spooner; Laura Stacey; Kati Tabin; Claire Thompson; Blayre Turnbull; Daryl Watts	Switzerland; Annic Büchi; Lara Stalder; Kaleigh Quennec; Shannon Sigrist; Laura Zimmermann; Lisa Rüedi; Ivana Wey; Laure Mériguet; Nicole Vallario; Lara Christen; Stefanie Wetli; Andrea Brändli; Rahel Enzler; Sinja Leemann; Alina Müller; Naemi Herzig; Alina Marti; Saskia Maurer; Vanessa Schaefer; Leoni Balzer; Monja Wagner; Lena-Marie Lutz; Alessia Baechler

== Luge ==
Event	Gold	Silver	Bronze
Men's singles	Max Langenhan; Germany	Jonas Müller; Austria	Dominik Fischnaller; Italy
Women's singles	Julia Taubitz; Germany	Elīna Ieva Bota; Latvia	Ashley Farquharson; United States
Men's doubles	Italy; Emanuel Rieder; Simon Kainzwaldner	Austria; Thomas Steu; Wolfgang Kindl	Germany; Tobias Wendl; Tobias Arlt
Women's doubles	Italy; Andrea Vötter; Marion Oberhofer	Germany; Dajana Eitberger; Magdalena Matschina	Austria; Selina Egle; Lara Kipp
Team relay	Germany; Julia Taubitz; Tobias Wendl; Tobias Arlt; Max Langenhan; Dajana Eitberger; Magdalena Matschina	Austria; Lisa Schulte; Thomas Steu; Wolfgang Kindl; Jonas Müller; Selina Egle; Lara Kipp	Italy; Verena Hofer; Emanuel Rieder; Simon Kainzwaldner; Dominik Fischnaller; Andrea Vötter; Marion Oberhofer

== Nordic combined ==
Event	Gold	Silver	Bronze
Individual large hill/10 km	Jens Lurås Oftebro; Norway	Johannes Lamparter; Austria	Ilkka Herola; Finland
Individual normal hill/10 km	Jens Lurås Oftebro; Norway	Johannes Lamparter; Austria	Eero Hirvonen; Finland
Team large hill/2 x 7.5 km	Norway; Andreas Skoglund; Jens Lurås Oftebro	Finland; Ilkka Herola; Eero Hirvonen	Austria; Stefan Rettenegger; Johannes Lamparter

== Short-track speed skating ==
=== Men's events ===
Event	Gold	Silver	Bronze
500 metres	Steven Dubois; Canada	Melle van 't Wout; Netherlands	Jens van 't Wout; Netherlands
1000 metres	Jens van 't Wout; Netherlands	Sun Long; China	Rim Jong-un; South Korea
1500 metres	Jens van 't Wout; Netherlands	Hwang Dae-heon; South Korea	Roberts Krūzbergs; Latvia
5000 metre relay	Netherlands; Teun Boer; Itzhak de Laat^{[a]} Friso Emons; Jens van 't Wout; Melle van 't Wout	South Korea; Hwang Dae-heon; Lee Jeong-min; Lee June-seo; Rim Jong-un; Shin Dong-min^{[a]}	Italy; Andrea Cassinelli; Thomas Nadalini; Pietro Sighel; Luca Spechenhauser

=== Women's events ===
Event	Gold	Silver	Bronze
500 metres	Xandra Velzeboer; Netherlands	Arianna Fontana; Italy	Courtney Sarault; Canada
1000 metres	Xandra Velzeboer; Netherlands	Courtney Sarault; Canada	Kim Gil-li; South Korea
1500 metres	Kim Gil-li; South Korea	Choi Min-jeong; South Korea	Corinne Stoddard; United States
3000 metre relay	South Korea; Choi Min-jeong; Kim Gil-li; Shim Suk-hee; Lee So-yeon^{[a]} Noh Do-hee	Italy; Elisa Confortola; Arianna Fontana; Chiara Betti; Arianna Sighel	Canada; Danaé Blais; Florence Brunelle; Kim Boutin; Courtney Sarault

=== Mixed event ===
Event	Gold	Silver	Bronze
2000 metre relay	Italy; Elisa Confortola; Arianna Fontana; Thomas Nadalini; Pietro Sighel; Chiara Betti^{[a]}	Canada; Kim Boutin; William Dandjinou; Félix Roussel; Courtney Sarault; Steven Dubois^{[a]}	Belgium; Hanne Desmet; Stijn Desmet; Tineke den Dulk; Ward Pétré

^{a} Skaters who did not participate in the final, but received medals.

== Skeleton ==
Event	Gold	Silver	Bronze
Men's	Matt Weston; Great Britain	Axel Jungk; Germany	Christopher Grotheer; Germany
Women's	Janine Flock; Austria	Susanne Kreher; Germany	Jacqueline Pfeifer; Germany
Mixed team	Great Britain; Tabitha Stoecker; Matt Weston	Germany; Susanne Kreher; Axel Jungk	Germany; Jacqueline Pfeifer; Christopher Grotheer

== Ski jumping ==
=== Men's events ===
Event	Gold	Silver	Bronze
Men's normal hill individual	Philipp Raimund; Germany	Kacper Tomasiak; Poland	Ren Nikaidō; Japan; Gregor Deschwanden; Switzerland
Men's large hill individual	Domen Prevc; Slovenia	Ren Nikaidō; Japan	Kacper Tomasiak; Poland
Men's large hill super team	Austria; Jan Hörl; Stephan Embacher	Poland; Paweł Wąsek; Kacper Tomasiak	Norway; Johann André Forfang; Kristoffer Eriksen Sundal

=== Women's events ===
Event	Gold	Silver	Bronze
Women's normal hill individual	Anna Odine Strøm; Norway	Nika Prevc; Slovenia	Nozomi Maruyama; Japan
Women's large hill individual	Anna Odine Strøm; Norway	Eirin Maria Kvandal; Norway	Nika Prevc; Slovenia

=== Mixed event ===
Event	Gold	Silver	Bronze
Mixed normal hill team	Slovenia; Nika Vodan; Anže Lanišek; Nika Prevc; Domen Prevc	Norway; Anna Odine Strøm; Kristoffer Eriksen Sundal; Eirin Maria Kvandal; Marius Lindvik	Japan; Nozomi Maruyama; Ryōyū Kobayashi; Sara Takanashi; Ren Nikaidō

== Ski mountaineering ==
Event	Gold	Silver	Bronze
Men's sprint	Oriol Cardona; Spain	Nikita Filippov; Individual Neutral Athletes	Thibault Anselmet; France
Women's sprint	Marianne Fatton; Switzerland	Emily Harrop; France	Ana Alonso; Spain
Mixed relay	France; Emily Harrop; Thibault Anselmet	Switzerland; Marianne Fatton; Jon Kistler	Spain; Ana Alonso; Oriol Cardona

== Snowboarding ==
=== Men's events ===
Event	Gold	Silver	Bronze
Big air	Kira Kimura; Japan	Ryoma Kimata; Japan	Su Yiming; China
Halfpipe	Yūto Totsuka; Japan	Scotty James; Australia	Ryusei Yamada; Japan
Slopestyle	Su Yiming; China	Taiga Hasegawa; Japan	Jake Canter; United States
Parallel giant slalom	Benjamin Karl; Austria	Kim Sang-kyum; South Korea	Tervel Zamfirov; Bulgaria
Snowboard cross	Alessandro Hämmerle; Austria	Éliot Grondin; Canada	Jakob Dusek; Austria

=== Women's events ===
Event	Gold	Silver	Bronze
Big air	Kokomo Murase; Japan	Zoi Sadowski-Synnott; New Zealand	Yu Seung-eun; South Korea
Halfpipe	Choi Ga-on; South Korea	Chloe Kim; United States	Mitsuki Ono; Japan
Slopestyle	Mari Fukada; Japan	Zoi Sadowski-Synnott; New Zealand	Kokomo Murase; Japan
Parallel giant slalom	Zuzana Maděrová; Czech Republic	Sabine Payer; Austria	Lucia Dalmasso; Italy
Snowboard cross	Josie Baff; Australia	Eva Adamczyková; Czech Republic	Michela Moioli; Italy

==== Mixed event ====
Event	Gold	Silver	Bronze
Team snowboard cross	Great Britain; Huw Nightingale; Charlotte Bankes	Italy; Lorenzo Sommariva; Michela Moioli	France; Loan Bozzolo; Léa Casta

== Speed skating ==
=== Men's events ===
Event	Gold	Silver	Bronze
500 metres	Jordan Stolz; United States	Jenning de Boo; Netherlands	Laurent Dubreuil; Canada
1000 metres	Jordan Stolz; United States	Jenning de Boo; Netherlands	Ning Zhongyan; China
1500 metres	Ning Zhongyan; China	Jordan Stolz; United States	Kjeld Nuis; Netherlands
5000 metres	Sander Eitrem; Norway	Metoděj Jílek; Czech Republic	Riccardo Lorello; Italy
10,000 metres	Metoděj Jílek; Czech Republic	Vladimir Semirunniy; Poland	Jorrit Bergsma; Netherlands
Mass start	Jorrit Bergsma; Netherlands	Viktor Hald Thorup; Denmark	Andrea Giovannini; Italy
Team pursuit	Italy; Davide Ghiotto; Andrea Giovannini; Michele Malfatti	United States; Ethan Cepuran; Casey Dawson; Emery Lehman	China; Li Wenhao; Liu Hanbin; Ning Zhongyan; Wu Yu

=== Women's events ===
Event	Gold	Silver	Bronze
500 metres	Femke Kok; Netherlands	Jutta Leerdam; Netherlands	Miho Takagi; Japan
1000 metres	Jutta Leerdam; Netherlands	Femke Kok; Netherlands	Miho Takagi; Japan
1500 metres	Antoinette Rijpma-de Jong; Netherlands	Ragne Wiklund; Norway	Valérie Maltais; Canada
3000 metres	Francesca Lollobrigida; Italy	Ragne Wiklund; Norway	Valérie Maltais; Canada
5000 metres	Francesca Lollobrigida; Italy	Merel Conijn; Netherlands	Ragne Wiklund; Norway
Mass start	Marijke Groenewoud; Netherlands	Ivanie Blondin; Canada	Mia Manganello; United States
Team pursuit	Canada; Ivanie Blondin; Valérie Maltais; Isabelle Weidemann	Netherlands; Joy Beune; Marijke Groenewoud; Antoinette Rijpma-de Jong	Japan; Momoka Horikawa; Hana Noake; Ayano Sato; Miho Takagi

^{a} Skaters who did not participate in the final of the team pursuit event, but received medals as part of the team, having taken part in an earlier round.

== See also ==
- 2026 Winter Olympics medal table
