= IBSF World Championships 2024 – Two-man =

Two-man at the IBSF World Championships 2024
- Venue: Winterberg bobsleigh, luge, and skeleton track
- Location: Winterberg, Germany
- Dates: 24 February (run 1–2); 25 February (run 3–4)
- Competitors: 56 from 15 nations
- Teams: 28

Medalists
gold medal	Francesco Friedrich; Alexander Schüller	Germany
silver medal	Adam Ammour; Issam Ammour	Germany
bronze medal	Johannes Lochner; Georg Fleischhauer	Germany

The Two-man competition at the IBSF World Championships 2024 was held on 24 and 25 February 2024.

== Results ==
The first two runs were started on 24 February at 13:04. The last two runs were held on 25 February at 13:19.

Rank	Bib	Country	Athletes	Run 1	Rank	Run 2	Rank	Run 3	Rank	Run 4	Rank	Total	Behind
1st place, gold medalist(s)	1	Germany	Francesco Friedrich; Alexander Schüller	54.67	1	54.54	1	54.39	1	54.67	3	3:38.27	
2nd place, silver medalist(s)	3	Germany	Adam Ammour; Issam Ammour	54.73	2	54.70	2	54.62	3	54.56	1	3:38.61	+0.34
3rd place, bronze medalist(s)	2	Germany	Johannes Lochner; Georg Fleischhauer	54.92	3	54.81	3	54.45	2	54.56	1	3:38.74	+0.47
4	16	Great Britain	Brad Hall; Taylor Lawrence	55.10	5	54.90	4	55.02	4	54.92	4	3:39.94	+1.67
5	7	United States	Frank Del Duca; Manteo Mitchell	55.07	4	54.99	5	55.14	6	55.04	5	3:40.24	+1.97
6	4	Latvia	Emīls Cipulis; Matīss Miknis	55.25	7	55.14	6	55.04	5	55.19	6	3:40.62	+2.35
7	20	Monaco	Boris Vain; Antoine Riou	55.23	6	55.24	8	55.26	10	55.23	7	3:40.96	+2.69
8	6	Italy	Patrick Baumgartner; Robert Mircea	55.43	9	55.18	7	55.20	7	55.31	9	3:41.12	+2.85
9	9	Austria	Markus Treichl; Sascha Stepan	55.30	8	55.35	10	55.25	9	55.32	11	3:41.22	+2.95
10	5	Switzerland	Simon Friedli; Andreas Haas	55.53	13	55.30	9	55.23	8	55.24	8	3:41.30	+3.03
11	8	Switzerland	Cédric Follador; Luca Rolli	55.45	10	55.45	12	55.27	11	55.34	12	3:41.51	+3.24
12	14	Switzerland	Timo Rohner; Gregory Jones	55.58	16	55.35	10	55.40	12	55.31	9	3:41.64	+3.27
13	12	Romania	Mihai Tentea; George Iordache	55.48	11	55.49	13	55.44	13	55.37	13	3:41.78	+3.51
14	15	United States	Kristopher Horn; Hakeem Abdul-Saboor	55.53	13	55.50	14	55.47	15	55.44	14	3:41.94	+3.67
15	10	China	Li Chunjian; Zhen Heng	55.55	15	55.55	16	55.46	14	55.48	15	3:42.04	+3.77
16	19	Czech Republic	Matěj Běhounek; Antonín Wijas	55.76	21	55.60	19	56.05	20	55.54	16	3:42.95	+4.68
17	24	Canada	Pat Norton; Mike Evelyn	55.75	19	55.54	15	56.18	24	55.57	17	3:43.04	+4.77
18	21	Austria	Jakob Mandlbauer; Daiyehan Nichols-Bardi	55.72	17	55.67	20	56.14	23	55.64	18	3:43.17	+4.90
19	23	Netherlands	Dave Wesselink; Jelen Franjic	55.75	19	55.71	21	56.07	21	55.69	19	3:43.22	+4.95
20	27	Czech Republic	Jáchym Procházka; David Bureš	55.72	17	55.56	17	55.83	16	56.98	20	3:44.09	+5.82
21	11	China	Sun Kaizhi; Ye Jielong	55.78	22	55.56	17	56.20	25	Did not advance			
22	18	Canada	Taylor Austin; Shane Ohrt	55.92	25	55.71	21	56.08	22	Did not advance			
23	17	Great Britain	John Stanbridge; Jens Hullah	55.86	23	55.91	25	56.02	19	Did not advance			
24	26	Poland	Aleksy Boroń; Bartosz Sienkiewicz	55.95	26	55.89	24	55.97	18	Did not advance			
25	22	Liechtenstein	Martin Kranz; Martin Bertschler	55.88	24	55.75	23	56.30	27	Did not advance			
26	25	Italy	Mattia Variola; Fabio Batti	56.07	27	55.98	27	55.91	17	Did not advance			
27	28	Poland	Radosław Sobczyk; Seweryn Sosna	56.15	28	55.94	26	56.26	26	Did not advance			
–	13	Latvia	Jēkabs Kalenda; Edgars Ungurs	55.50	12	1:00.24	28	Did not start					
