= IBSF World Championships 2024 – Four-man =

Four-man at the IBSF World Championships 2024
- Venue: Winterberg bobsleigh, luge, and skeleton track
- Location: Winterberg, Germany
- Dates: 2 March (run 1–2); 3 March (run 3–4)
- Competitors: 89 from 13 nations
- Teams: 22
- Winning time: 3:34.10

Medalists
gold medal	Francesco Friedrich; Thorsten Margis; Alexander Schüller; Felix Straub	Germany
silver medal	Johannes Lochner; Florian Bauer; Erec Bruckert; Georg Fleischhauer	Germany
bronze medal	Adam Ammour; Issam Ammour; Benedikt Hertel; Rupert Schenk	Germany

The Four-man competition at the IBSF World Championships 2024 was held on 2 and 3 March 2024.

== Results ==
The first two runs were started on 2 March at 10:04. The last two runs were held on 3 March at 14:30.

Rank	Bib	Country	Athletes	Run 1	Rank	Run 2	Rank	Run 3	Rank	Run 4	Rank	Total	Behind
1st place, gold medalist(s)	1	Germany	Francesco Friedrich; Thorsten Margis; Alexander Schüller; Felix Straub	53.12	1	54.06	1	53.11	1	53.81	1	3:34.10	
2nd place, silver medalist(s)	3	Germany	Johannes Lochner; Florian Bauer; Erec Bruckert; Georg Fleischhauer	53.29	2	54.16	2	53.47	2	54.06	7	3:34.98	+0.88
3rd place, bronze medalist(s)	11	Germany	Adam Ammour; Issam Ammour; Benedikt Hertel; Rupert Schenk	53.70	4	54.23	3	53.50	4	53.88	2	3:35.31	+1.21
4	2	Latvia	Emīls Cipulis; Dāvis Spriņģis; Matīss Miknis; Krists Lindenblats	53.58	3	54.40	8	53.49	3	53.99	4	3:35.46	+1.36
5	7	Austria	Markus Treichl; Sascha Stepan; Markus Sammer; Kristian Huber	53.73	5	54.35	6	53.59	6	54.01	5	3:35.68	+1.58
6	17	Great Britain	Brad Hall; Leon Greenwood; Taylor Lawrence; Greg Cackett	53.92	8	54.26	4	53.54	5	53.98	3	3:35.70	+1.60
7	5	Italy	Patrick Baumgartner; Eric Fantazzini; Robert Mircea; Lorenzo Bilotti	53.81	6	54.43	9	53.89	7	54.03	6	3:36.16	+2.06
8	4	Switzerland	Simon Friedli; Dominik Schläpfer; Luca Rolli; Andreas Haas	53.85	7	54.84	19	53.89	7	54.10	8	3:36.68	+2.58
9	8	China	Sun Kaizhi; Ding Song; Ye Jielong; Ding Yunda	53.98	9	54.65	14	54.07	10	54.32	9	3:37.02	+2.92
10	6	Switzerland	Cédric Follador; Omar Vögele; Dominik Hufschmid; Gregory Jones	53.99	10	54.76	16	54.03	9	54.34	10	3:37.12	+3.02
11	10	China	Li Chunjian; Wei Peng; Zhu Zilong; Zhen Heng	54.16	12	54.56	13	54.26	12	54.35	11	3:37.33	+3.23
12	20	Canada	Taylor Austin; DeVaughn McEwan; Anthony Couturier; Shaquille Murray-Lawrence	54.52	16	54.37	7	54.24	11	54.36	12	3:37.49	+3.39
13	22	United States	Frank Del Duca; Adrian Adams; Manteo Mitchell; Hakeem Abdul-Saboor	54.64	18	54.34	5	54.27	13	54.38	13	3:37.63	+3.53
14	13	Switzerland	Timo Rohner; Nicola Mariani; Mathieu Hersperger; Quentin Juillard	54.20	13	54.80	18	54.35	14	54.41	16	3:37.76	+3.66
15	15	Czech Republic	Matěj Běhounek; Michal Dobeš; David Bureš; Antonín Wijas	54.66	19	54.50	11	54.45	16	54.38	13	3:37.99	+3.89
16	16	Netherlands	Dave Wesselink; Janko Franjic; Jelen Franjic; Stephan Huis in 't Veld	54.44	14	54.70	15	54.49	17	54.73	17	3:38.36	+4.26
17	14	Austria	Jakob Mandlbauer; Dominik Hanschitz; Daiyehan Nichols-Bardi; Lukas Zech (Runs 1-2); Adam Wiener (Runs 3-4)	54.45	15	54.51	12	54.40	15	55.02	20	3:38.38	+4.28
18	21	Great Britain	Adam Baird; Jens Hullah; Austin Milward; Callum Dixon	54.57	17	54.77	17	54.67	19	54.39	15	3:38.40	+4.30
19	18	Italy	Mattia Variola; Fabio Batti; Nicola Ceresatto; Delmas Obou	54.91	20	54.45	10	54.53	18	54.94	19	3:38.83	+4.73
20	23	Liechtenstein	Martin Kranz; David Tschofen; Lorenz Lenherr; Martin Bertschler	55.22	21	54.94	20	55.09	20	54.78	18	3:40.03	+5.93
21	19	Poland	Aleksy Boroń; Bartosz Sienkiewicz; Seweryn Sosna; Dominik Boiński	55.31	22	55.67	21	55.40	21	Did not advance			
–	9	Latvia	Jēkabs Kalenda; Edgars Ungurs; Lauris Kaufmanis; Mairis Kļava	54.01	11	55.88	22	Did not start					
–	12	Romania	Mihai Tentea; Constantin Dinescu; Mihai Păcioianu; George Iordache	Did not start									
