= Bobsleigh at the 2026 Winter Olympics =

Bobsleigh at the XXV Olympic Winter Games
- Bobsleigh pictogram
- Venue: Cortina Sliding Centre, Cortina d'Ampezzo
- Dates: 15–22 February 2026
- No. of events: 4 (2 men, 2 women)

Bobsleigh at the 2026 Winter Olympics was held at the Cortina Sliding Centre in Cortina d'Ampezzo. A total of four bobsleigh events were held, between 15 and 22 February 2026.

== Competition schedule ==
The following is the competition schedule for all four events.

All times are in local time (UTC+1).

Date	Time	Event
15 February	10:00	Women's monobob – Heats 1 and 2
16 February	10:00	Two-man – Heats 1 and 2
16 February	19:00	Women's monobob – Heats 3 and 4
17 February	19:00	Two-man – Heats 3 and 4
20 February	18:00	Two-woman – Heats 1 and 2
21 February	10:00	Four-man – Heats 1 and 2
21 February	19:00	Two-woman – Heats 3 and 4
22 February	10:00	Four-man – Heats 3 and 4

== Medal summary ==
=== Medal table ===
Rank	NOC	Gold	Silver	Bronze	Total
1	Germany	3	4	1	8
2	United States	1	0	2	3
3	Switzerland	0	0	1	1
Totals (3 entries)		4	4	4	12

=== Medalists ===
Event	Gold		Silver		Bronze	
Two-man	Germany; Johannes Lochner; Georg Fleischhauer	3:39.70	Germany; Francesco Friedrich; Alexander Schüller	3:41.04	Germany; Adam Ammour; Alexander Schaller	3:41.52
Four-man	Germany; Johannes Lochner; Thorsten Margis; Jörn Wenzel; Georg Fleischhauer	3:37.57	Germany; Francesco Friedrich; Matthias Sommer; Alexander Schüller; Felix Straub	3:38.14	Switzerland; Michael Vogt; Andreas Haas; Amadou David Ndiaye; Mario Aeberhard	3:38.64
Women's monobob	Elana Meyers Taylor; United States	3:57.93	Laura Nolte; Germany	3:57.97	Kaillie Humphries; United States	3:58.05
Two-woman	Germany; Laura Nolte; Deborah Levi	3:48.46	Germany; Lisa Buckwitz; Neele Schuten	3:48.99	United States; Kaillie Humphries; Jasmine Jones	3:49.21
