= Bobsleigh at the 2026 Winter Olympics – Two-man =

Bobsleigh two-man at the XXV Olympic Winter Games
- Bobsleigh
- Venue: Cortina Sliding Centre; Cortina d'Ampezzo
- Date: 16, 17 February 2026
- Competitors: 53 from 18 nations
- Teams: 26
- Winning time: 3:39.70

Medalists
1st place, gold medalist(s)		Johannes Lochner; Georg Fleischhauer	Germany
2nd place, silver medalist(s)		Francesco Friedrich; Alexander Schüller	Germany
3rd place, bronze medalist(s)		Adam Ammour; Alexander Schaller	Germany

The two-man competition in bobsleigh at the 2026 Winter Olympics was held on 16 February (heats 1 and 2) and 17 February (heats 3 and 4), at the Cortina Sliding Centre in Cortina d'Ampezzo. German teams swept the podium: Johannes Lochner and Georg Fleischhauer became the champions, Francesco Friedrich and Alexander Schüller finished second, and Adam Ammour and Alexander Schaller third. For Lochner, this became the first Olympic gold; for Fleischhauer, Ammour, and Schaller, their first Olympic medals.

== Background ==
The defending champions were Francesco Friedrich and Thorsten Margis. Friedrich qualified for the event, but in 2026 he was running with Alexander Schüller. If they won, Friedrich would become the first person to win three gold medals in two-man bobsleigh. Similarly, the 2022 silver medalists were Johannes Lochner and Florian Bauer; Lochner was now running with Georg Fleischhauer. The bronze medalists were Christoph Hafer and Matthias Sommer. Hafer retired. Lochner won the 2025–26 Bobsleigh World Cup, having won six out of seven two-man races that season; the remaining race was won by Friedrich. Friedrich and Schüller were the 2025 World champions.

== Qualification ==
=== Summary ===
Sleds qualified	Countries	Athletes total	Nation
3	2	12	Germany; Switzerland
2	6	24	United States; Canada; South Korea; China; Latvia; Austria
1	10	20	Great Britain; Italy; France; Romania; Brazil; Netherlands; Liechtenstein; Jamaica; Trinidad and Tobago; Israel
26	18	56	

== Results ==
Rank	Bib	Athletes	Country	Run 1	Rank	Run 2	Rank	Run 3	Rank	Run 4	Rank	Total	Behind
1st place, gold medalist(s)	1	Johannes Lochner; Georg Fleischhauer	Germany	54.68 TR	1	55.22	1	54.89	1	54.91	1	3:39.70	
2nd place, silver medalist(s)	2	Francesco Friedrich; Alexander Schüller	Germany	55.16	3	55.54	2	55.01	2	55.33	2	3:41.04	+1.34
3rd place, bronze medalist(s)	3	Adam Ammour; Alexander Schaller	Germany	55.12	2	56.02	11	55.03	3	55.35	4	3:41.52	+1.82
4	4	Frank Del Duca; Joshua Williamson	United States	55.40	4	55.84	6	55.38	4	55.34	3	3:41.96	+2.26
5	11	Mihai Țentea; George Iordache	Romania	55.73	10	55.65	3	55.46	6	55.53	5	3:42.37	+2.67
6	6	Michael Vogt; Amadou David Ndiaye	Switzerland	55.64	7	55.85	7	55.47	7	55.64	8	3:42.60	+2.90
7	9	Patrick Baumgartner; Robert Mircea	Italy	55.58	6	56.00	10	55.49	8	55.60	6	3:42.67	+2.97
8	10	Jēkabs Kalenda; Matīss Miknis	Latvia	55.68	9	55.75	4	55.64	10	55.61	7	3:42.68	+2.98
9	8	Markus Treichl; Daniel Bertschler	Austria	55.89	13	55.76	5	55.62	9	55.74	10	3:43.01	+3.31
10	13	Romain Heinrich; Dorian Hauterville	France	55.75	11	55.89	8	55.75	12	55.93	13	3:43.32	+3.62
10	18	Dave Wesselink; Jelen Franjić	Netherlands	55.83	12	56.18	17	55.44	5	55.87	12	3:43.32	+3.62
12	7	Brad Hall; Taylor Lawrence (Run 1–2); Leon Greenwood (Run 3–4)	Great Britain	55.65	8	55.89	8	55.72	11	56.17	18	3:43.43	+3.73
13	5	Kim Jin-su; Kim Hyeong-geun	South Korea	55.53	5	56.16	15	55.90	16	56.01	15	3:43.60	+3.90
14	12	Cédric Follador; Luca Rolli	Switzerland	56.17	17	56.09	13	55.87	14	55.68	9	3:43.81	+4.11
15	15	Timo Rohner; Tim Annen	Switzerland	55.95	14	56.14	14	55.89	15	55.84	11	3:43.82	+4.12
16	16	Sun Kaizhi; An Tai	China	56.15	16	56.16	15	55.83	13	56.03	16	3:44.17	+4.47
17	21	Li Chunjian; Ye Jielong	China	55.99	15	56.30	20	56.36	23	55.94	14	3:44.59	+4.89
18	26	Taylor Austin; Shaquille Murray-Lawrence	Canada	56.18	18	56.07	12	56.08	19	56.27	20	3:44.60	+4.90
19	19	Suk Young-jin; Chae Byung-do	South Korea	56.27	19	56.23	18	56.03	18	56.08	17	3:44.61	+4.91
20	22	Martin Kranz; David Tschofen	Liechtenstein	56.31	20	56.29	19	56.09	20	56.24	19	3:44.93	+5.23
21	23	Jakob Mandlbauer; Daiyehan Nichols-Bardi	Austria	56.34	21	56.67	22	56.21	21	Did not advance		2:49.22	—
22	20	Shane Pitter; Junior Harris	Jamaica	56.68	22	56.72	23	55.97	17	Did not advance		2:49.37	—
23	14	Jacob Dearborn; Mike Evelyn	Canada	56.74	23	56.59	21	56.45	24	Did not advance		2:49.78	—
24	17	Edson Bindilatti; Luis Bacca Gonçalves	Brazil	56.95	24	56.81	24	56.22	22	Did not advance		2:49.98	—
25	24	Axel Brown; De Aundre John	Trinidad and Tobago	57.22	25	56.97	25	56.86	25	Did not advance		2:51.05	—
26	25	Adam Edelman; Menachem Chen	Israel	57.38	26	57.22	26	57.64	26	Did not advance		2:52.24	—
