= Aeberhard =

Aeberhard is a surname. Notable people with the surname include:

- Bruno Aeberhard (born 1976), Swiss bobsledder
- Mario Aeberhard (born 2005), Swiss bobsledder
- Urs Aeberhard (born 1971), Swiss bobsledder
