= Joshua Tasche =

German bobsledder (born 1995)

Personal information
- Born: 8 September 1995 (age 30)
- Height: 1.87 m (6 ft 2 in)
- Weight: 90 kg (198 lb)

Sport
- Country: Germany
- Sport: Bobsleigh
- Event: Four-man
Medal record
Men's bobsleigh
Representing Germany
European Championships
Gold medal – first place	2026 St. Moritz	Four-man
Silver medal – second place	2024 Igls	Four-man

Joshua Tasche (born 8 September 1995) is a German bobsledder. He represented Germany at the 2026 Winter Olympics.

== Career ==
In December 2023, Tasche represented Germany at the IBSF European Championships 2024 and won a silver medal in the four-man event, along with Johannes Lochner, Erec Bruckert and Georg Fleischhauer. He then competed at the IBSF World Championships 2024 and finished in fourth place in the four-man event.

He again competed at the IBSF European Championships 2026 and won a gold medal in the four-man event, along with Adam Ammour, Issam Ammour and Alexander Schaller. During their second race run, they set a St. Moritz-Celerina Olympic Bobrun track record with a time of 1:04.47.

He represented Germany at the 2026 Winter Olympics in the four-man event and finished in fourth place with a time of 3:38.68.
