= David Tschofen =

Liechtensteiner bobsledder (born 2002)

Personal information
- Nationality: Liechtensteiner
- Born: 30 August 2002 (age 24)
- Height: 182 cm (6 ft 0 in)

Sport
- Country: Liechtenstein
- Sport: Bobsleigh
- Events: Two-man, Four-man

David Tschofen (born 30 August 2002) in a Liechtensteiner bobsledder. He represented Liechtenstein at the 2026 Winter Olympics.

== Career ==
Prior to bobsleigh, Tschofen was a track and field athlete participating in multiple events, including decathlon, long jump, and pole vault. He began participating in bobsleigh in 2023, and 2024 he made his debut in the Bobsleigh World Cup. At the 2026 Winter Olympics, Tschofen was a push athlete for the team of Martin Kranz. In the two-man competition, the team finished 20th. In the four-man, the team finished 21st.

Outside of sport, Tschofen works as a carpenter.

== Bobsleigh results ==
All results are sourced from the International Bobsleigh and Skeleton Federation (IBSF).

=== Olympic Games ===
| Event | Two-man | Four-man |
|---|---|---|
| (Italy) 2026 Milano Cortina | 20th | 21st |

=== World Championships ===
| Event | Two-man | Four-man |
|---|---|---|
| (Germany) 2024 Winterberg | — | 20th |
