= IBSF European Championships 2024 =

Bobsleigh and skeleton event in Latvia and Austria

2024 European Championships
- Venue: Igls bobsleigh, luge, and skeleton track Sigulda bobsleigh, luge, and skeleton track
- Location: (Austria) Igls (Four-man) (Latvia) Sigulda
- Dates: 2–4 February

The 2024 IBSF European Championships was held from 2 to 4 February 2024 in Sigulda, Latvia. Since the venue, the Sigulda bobsleigh, luge, and skeleton track, cannot host four-man bobsleigh races, this part of the championship was held in Igls, Austria on December 17.

== Schedule ==
All times are local.

Date	Time	Event	Venue
17 December 2023	13:30 (UTC+1)	Four-man Bobsleigh	(Austria) Igls
2 February 2024	11:30 (UTC+2)	Men's Skeleton	(Latvia) Sigulda
2 February 2024	15:00 (UTC+2)	Women's Skeleton	(Latvia) Sigulda
3 February 2024	10:00 (UTC+2)	Women's Monobob	(Latvia) Sigulda
4 February 2024	10:00 (UTC+2)	Two-woman Bobsleigh	(Latvia) Sigulda
4 February 2024	14:00 (UTC+2)	Two-man Bobsleigh	(Latvia) Sigulda

== Medal summary ==
=== Medal table ===
* Host nation (Latvia)

Rank	Nation	Gold	Silver	Bronze	Total
1	Germany	4	3	3	10
2	Great Britain	1	1	1	3
3	Belgium	1	0	0	1
4	Switzerland	0	1	1	2
5	Romania	0	1	0	1
6	Latvia*	0	0	1	1
Totals (6 entries)		6	6	6	18

=== By athlete ===
Rank	Nation	Gold	Silver	Bronze	Total
1	(Germany) Laura Nolte	1	0	1	2
2	(Germany) Adam Ammour	1	0	0	1
2	(Germany) Alexander Schüller	1	0	0	1
2	(Germany) Candy Bauer	1	0	0	1
2	(Germany) Felix Straub	1	0	0	1
2	(Germany) Francesco Friedrich	1	0	0	1
2	(Germany) Issam Ammour	1	0	0	1
2	(Belgium) Kim Meylemans	1	0	0	1
2	(Germany) Lisa Buckwitz	1	0	0	1
2	(United Kingdom) Marcus Wyatt	1	0	0	1
2	(Germany) Neele Schuten	1	0	0	1
12	(Germany) Erec Bruckert	0	1	1	2
12	(Germany) Johannes Lochner	0	1	1	2
14	(Germany) Anabel Galander	0	1	0	1
14	(Romania) Andreea Grecu	0	1	0	1
14	(Germany) Georg Fleischhauer	0	1	0	1
14	(Germany) Hannah Neise	0	1	0	1
14	(Germany) Joshua Tasche	0	1	0	1
14	(Germany) Kim Kalicki	0	1	0	1
14	(United Kingdom) Matt Weston	0	1	0	1
14	(Switzerland) Michael Vogt	0	1	0	1
14	(Switzerland) Sandro Michel	0	1	0	1
23	(United Kingdom) Amelia Coltman	0	0	1	1
23	(Latvia) Dāvis Spriņģis	0	0	1	1
23	(Latvia) Emīls Cipulis	0	0	1	1
23	(Germany) Felix Keisinger	0	0	1	1
23	(Latvia) Krists Lindenblats	0	0	1	1
23	(Switzerland) Mara Morell	0	0	1	1
23	(Latvia) Matīss Miknis	0	0	1	1
23	(Switzerland) Melanie Hasler	0	0	1	1
Totals (30 entries)		11	11	11	33

=== Skeleton ===
Event	Gold		Silver		Bronze	
Men	Marcus Wyatt; Great Britain	1:41.00	Matt Weston; Great Britain	1:41.16	Felix Keisinger; Germany	1:41.36
Women	Kim Meylemans; Belgium	1:43.38	Hannah Neise; Germany	1:43.41	Amelia Coltman; Great Britain	1:43.49

=== Bobsleigh ===
Event	Gold		Silver		Bronze	
Women's Monobob	Lisa Buckwitz; Germany	1:47.46	Andreea Grecu; Romania	1:47.73	Laura Nolte; Germany	1:47.87
Two-woman	Germany; Laura Nolte; Neele Schuten	1:41.53	Germany; Kim Kalicki; Anabel Galander	1:41.82	Switzerland; Melanie Hasler; Mara Morell	1:42.06
Two-man	Germany; Adam Ammour; Issam Ammour	1:38.22	Switzerland; Michael Vogt; Sandro Michel	1:38.28	Germany; Johannes Lochner; Erec Bruckert	1:38.29
Four-man	Germany; Francesco Friedrich; Candy Bauer; Alexander Schüller; Felix Straub	1:40.89	Germany; Johannes Lochner; Erec Bruckert; Joshua Tasche; Georg Fleischhauer	1:41.03	Latvia; Emīls Cipulis; Dāvis Spriņģis; Matīss Miknis; Krists Lindenblats	1:41.35

== See also ==
- Bobsleigh and Skeleton European Championship
