= Luca Rolli =

Swiss bobsledder (born 1999)

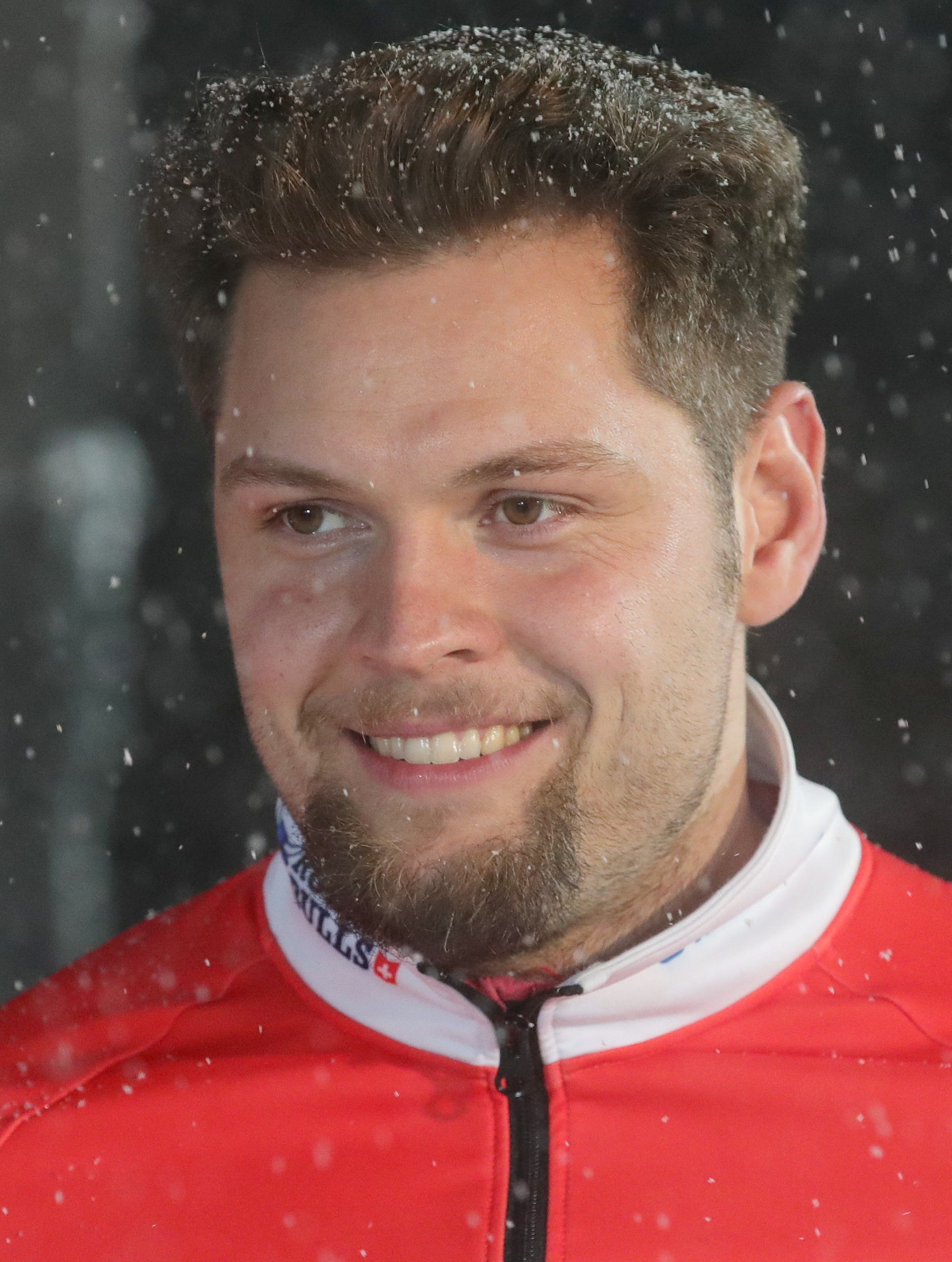
- Rolli at a World Cup event at Altenberg in 2023

Personal information
- Nationality: Swiss
- Born: 17 January 1997 (age 29) Oberdiessbach, Bern, Switzerland

Sport
- Country: Switzerland
- Sport: Bobsleigh
- Events: Two-man, Four-man
Medal record
Men's bobsleigh
Representing Switzerland
Junior World Championships
Silver medal – second place	2022 Innsbruck	Two-man

Luca Rolli (born 17 January 1997) is a Swiss bobsledder. He represented Switzerland at the 2022 and 2026 Winter Olympics. At the 2022 Winter Olympics, Rolli participated in the four-man as a push athlete for the team of Michael Vogt. The team finished 11th. At the 2026 Winter Olympics, Rolli participated in both two-man and four-man on the team of Cédric Follador. In two-man, they finished 14th.. In the four-man, they finished 6th.

Rolli has earned one medal in Bobsleigh World Cup competition, a bronze at Altenberg in the four-man event in 2024.

== Bobsleigh results ==
All results are sourced from the International Bobsleigh and Skeleton Federation (IBSF).

=== Olympic Games ===
Event	Two-man	Four-man
(China) 2022 Beijing	—	11th
(Italy) 2026 Milano Cortina	14th	6th

=== World Championships ===
Event	Two-man	Four-man
(Switzerland) 2023 St. Moritz	8th	9th
(Germany) 2024 Winterberg	11th	8th
