= Menachem Chen =

Israeli athlete and bobsledder (born 2000)

Personal information
- Full name: Menachem Mendel Chen
- Nationality: Israeli
- Born: 1 November 2000 (age 25)

Sport
- Country: Israel
- Sport: Discus Throw, Shot Put, Bobsleigh
- Events: Two-man, Four-man (bobsleigh)

Menachem Mendel Chen (Hebrew: מנחם מענדל חן; born 1 November 2000) is an Israeli athlete and bobsledder. In athletics, Chen has been the Israeli national shot put champion on four occasions. In bobsleigh, Chen represented Israel at the 2026 Winter Olympics in two-man and four-man.

== Career ==
=== Athletics ===
Chen's sporting career began with track and field. Chen specializes in throwing events, particularly shot put and discus throw. He has on four occasions been the Israeli national shot put champion. In 2023, Chen came to the United States and joined the track and field team at Arkansas State University. In 2025, Chen won the discus throw event and placed third in the shot put event at the Sun Belt Conference outdoor track and field championships. In 2026, less than a week after competing in the Olympics, Chen finished second in shot put at the Sun Belt Conference indoor championships.

=== Bobsleigh ===
Chen made his bobsleigh debut in 2021 as a pusher, but did not compete again for several years. In 2025, he was recruited by Adam Edelman to return to bobsleigh with a goal of reaching the 2026 Winter Olympics. The team finished fifth in the IBSF North American Cup, successfully qualifying for the games and becoming the first Israeli bobsleigh team at the Olympics. Chen pushed for Edelman's team in both two-man and four-man. In two-man, the team finished 26th. In four man, the team completed their first two runs, but were forced to withdraw by the Israeli Olympic Committee after another team member lied about medical status in an attempt to facilitate an illegal substitution to the reserve team member.

== Personal life ==
Chen is a resident of Rishon LeZion, Israel.

== Bobsleigh results ==
=== Olympic Games ===
Event	Two-man	Four-man
(Italy) 2026 Milano Cortina	26th	DNF
