= Costa Laurenz =

German bobsledder & sprinter (born 1993)

Personal information
- Nationality: German
- Born: 19 June 1993 (age 33)

Sport
- Country: Germany
- Sport: Bobsleigh

Costa Laurenz (born 19 June 1993) is a German former sprint athlete who transitioned to bobsledding. He won multiple junior world titles in the four-man competition and later achieved World Cup success in the two-man event.

== Athletics career ==
Laurenz competed in track and field specializing in the 100 m and 200 m sprints. His personal best in the 100 m was 10.73 seconds, and he was a multiple medalist at German youth championships.

== Bobsleigh career ==
Laurenz became Junior World Champion in four-man bobsleigh in both 2017 and 2019. In February 2024, he won a two-man World Cup race in Altenberg with pilot Adam Ammour. He is also known for his partnership with pilot Kim Kalicki, whom he later married.

== Personal life ==
In May 2025, Laurenz married German bobsleigh pilot and 2023 World Champion Kim Kalicki who made the announcement via Instagram.
