= Shi Hao (bobsledder) =

Chinese bobsledder

Personal information
- Nationality: Chinese
- Born: 7 September 1997 (age 27)

Sport
- Sport: Bobsleigh

Shi Hao (Chinese: 史昊; pinyin: Shǐ Hào; Mandarin pronunciation: [ʂɻ̩̀ xâʊ]; born 7 September 1997) is a Chinese bobsledder. He competed in the two-man event at the 2018 and 2022 Winter Olympics.
