= Chae Byung-do =

South Korean bobsledder (born 2001)

Personal information
- Nationality: South Korean
- Born: 24 November 2001 (age 24)
- Height: 179 cm (5 ft 10 in)
- Weight: 88 kg (194 lb)

Sport
- Country: South Korea
- Sport: Bobsleigh
- Events: Two-man, Four-man

Chae Byung-do (Korean: 채병도; born 24 November 2001) is a South Korean bobsledder. He represented South Korea at the 2026 Winter Olympics as a push athlete in two-man and four-man, pushing for the team of Suk Young-jin. In the two-man competition, the team finished 19th. In four-man, the finished 22nd.

== Bobsleigh results ==
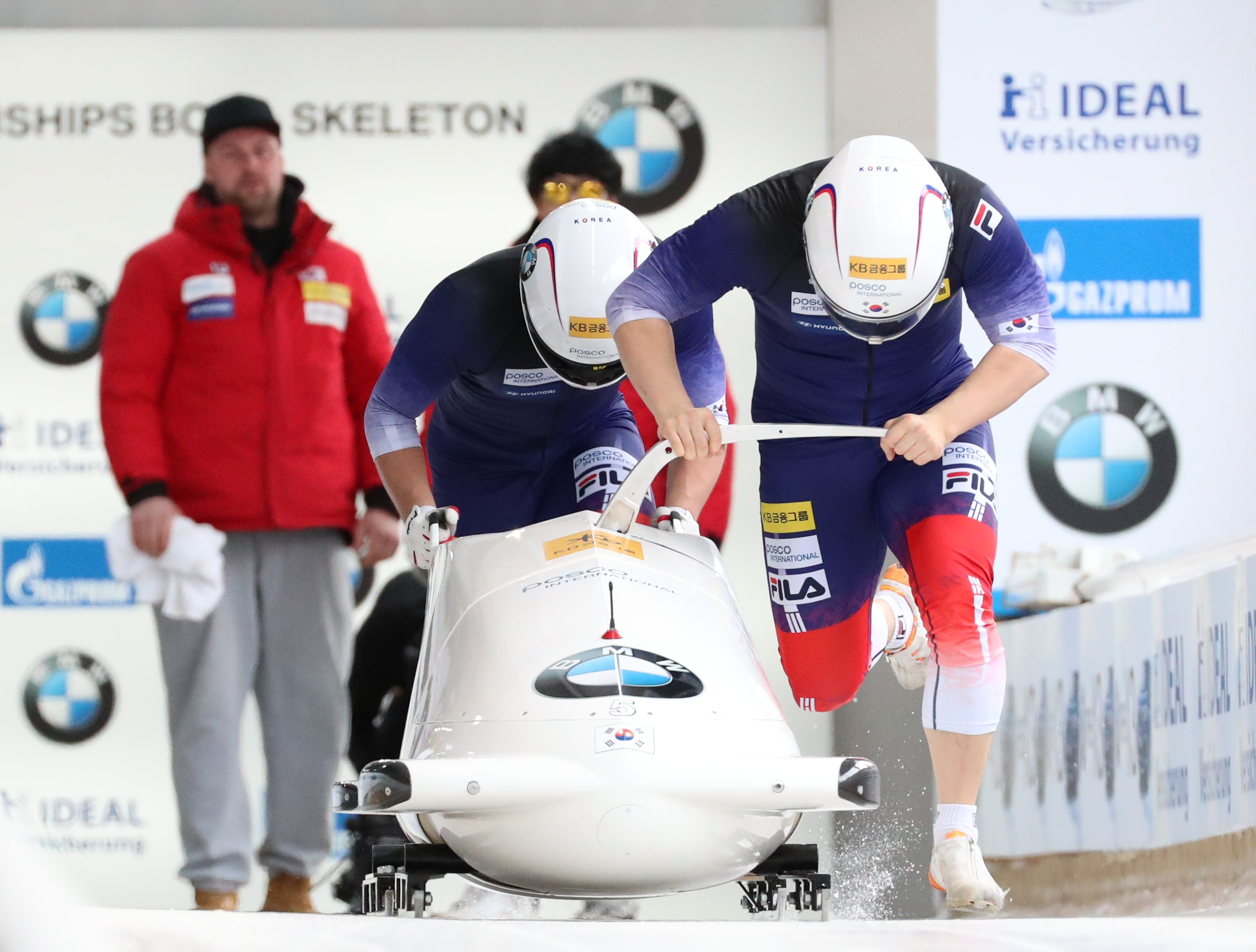
Chae (rear) competing at the IBSF World Championships 2020.

All results are sourced from the International Bobsleigh and Skeleton Federation (IBSF).

=== Olympic Games ===
Event	Two-man	Four-man
(Italy) 2026 Milano Cortina	19th	22nd

=== World Championships ===
Event	Two-man	Four-man
(Germany) 2020 Altenberg	14th	8th
(Germany) 2021 Altenberg	—	18th
