= Melanie Hasler =

Swiss bobsledder (born 1998)

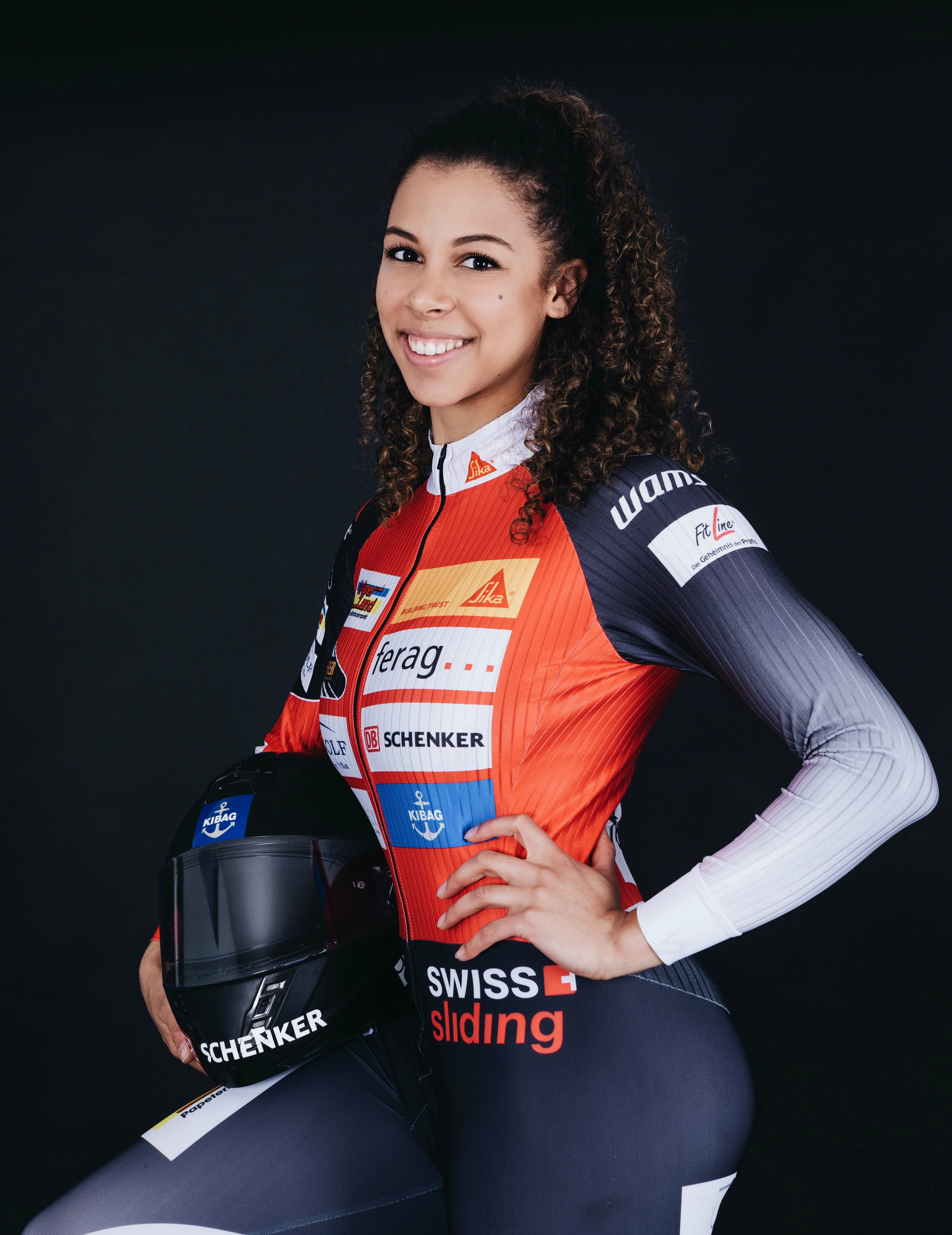

Personal information
- Born: 16 May 1998 (age 28) Berikon, Switzerland
- Height: 1.78 m (5 ft 10 in)
- Weight: 71 kg (157 lb)

Sport
- Country: Switzerland
- Sport: Bobsleigh
- Event(s): Two-woman, monobob
- Coached by: Christoph Langen
Medal record
Women's bobsleigh
Representing Switzerland
European Championships
Gold medal – first place	2026 St. Moritz	Monobob
Gold medal – first place	2026 St. Moritz	Two-woman
Silver medal – second place	2023 Altenberg	Two-woman
Silver medal – second place	2025 Lillehammer	Monobob
Bronze medal – third place	2024 Sigulda	Two-woman

Melanie Hasler (born 16 May 1998) is a Swiss bobsledder. She represented Switzerland at the 2022 and 2026 Winter Olympics.

== Early life ==
Hasler is of Dominican heritage, and the youngest of four children. She attended the United School of Sports in Zurich and began her career playing volleyball before switching to bobsleigh in 2017.

== Career ==
Hasler made her Bobsleigh World Cup debut during the 2019–20 Bobsleigh World Cup. She finished in fifth place in the two-woman event in her debut. In February 2020, she made her IBSF World Championships debut in the two-woman event.

She competed at the IBSF Junior World Championships 2021 and won a bronze medal in the two-woman event with a time of 2:20.51. During the final of the 2020–21 Bobsleigh World Cup, she won her first monobob event with a time of 1:48.37. She finished the monobob World Series in fifth place.

She represented Switzerland at the 2022 Winter Olympics and finished in sixth place in the two-woman event and seventh place in the monobob with a total time of 4:22.81.

In January 2023, she competed at the IBSF European Championships 2023 and won a silver medal in the two-woman event with a time of 1:55.36. The next month she competed at the IBSF World Championships 2023 and finished in fourth place in the two-woman event with a total time of 4:34.29.

In February 2024, she competed at the IBSF European Championships 2024 and won a bronze medal in the two-woman event with a time of 1:42.06. She again competed at the IBSF European Championships 2025 and won a silver medal in the monobob with a time of 1:49.33. This was the first medal in monobob for Switzerland in European Championships history. She competed at the IBSF European Championships 2026 and won a gold medal in the monobob event with a time of 2:23.80. She became the first Swiss athlete to win the title in the discipline. The next day she also won a gold medal in the two-woman event with a time of 2:18.41, finishing 0.02 seconds ahead of the German team of Laura Nolte and Leonie Kluwig.

== World Championships results ==
Event	Two-woman	Monobob
(Germany) 2020 Altenberg	15th	—N/a
(Germany) 2021 Altenberg	14th	10th
(Switzerland) 2023 St. Moritz	4th	7th
(Germany) 2024 Winterberg	7th	11th
(United States) 2025 Lake Placid	7th	DNS
