= Ye Jielong =

Chinese bobsledder (born 2000)

Personal information
- Nationality: Chinese
- Born: 2 March 2000 (age 26) Jinhua, Zhejiang, China

Sport
- Country: China
- Sport: Bobsleigh
- Events: Two-man, Four-man
Medal record
Men's bobsleigh
Representing China
Junior World Championships U23
Gold medal – first place	2020 Winterberg	Four-man

Ye Jielong (Chinese: 叶杰龙; born 2 March 2000) is a Chinese bobsledder. He represented China at the 2022 and 2026 Winter Olympics.

== Career ==
Ye began his sports career as a track and field athlete, specializing in javelin throw. In 2018, he transitioned to bobsleigh as a push athlete. In 2020, he earned a gold medal in four-man in the Under-23 Junior World Championships pushing for Sun Kaizhi. In 2023, Ye earned a bronze medal in four-man at the Bobsleigh World Cup event at Yanqing pushing again for Sun, making them the first Chinese team to earn a World Cup medal in bobsleigh.

Ye has represented China in the Winter Olympics twice. In 2022, he participated in the four-man pushing for Li Chunjian, where they finished 17th. In 2026, he participated in both two-man and four-man, pushing again for Li in both. In two-man, the team finished 17th, while in four-man the team finished 18th.

== Bobsleigh results ==
All results are sourced from the International Bobsleigh and Skeleton Federation (IBSF).

=== Olympic Games ===
Event	Two-man	Four-man
(China) 2022 Beijing	—	17th
(Italy) 2026 Milano Cortina	17th	18th

=== World Championships ===
Event	Two-man	Four-man
(Switzerland) 2023 St. Moritz	—	14th
(Germany) 2024 Winterberg	21st	9th
(United States) 2025 Lake Placid	19th	12th
