= Francesco Friedrich =

German bobsledder (born 1990)

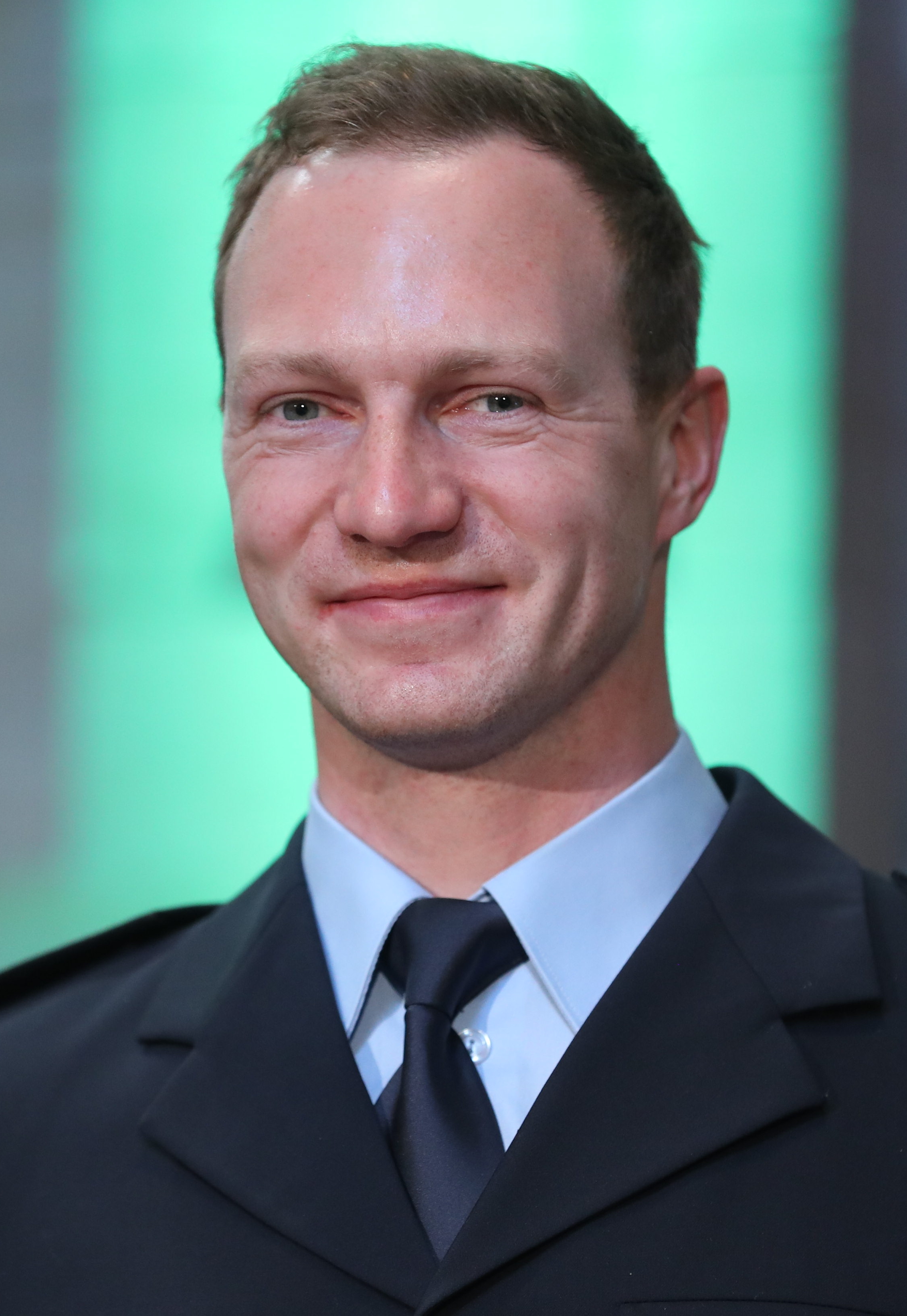
- Friedrich in 2022

Personal information
- Nationality: German
- Born: 2 May 1990 (age 36) Pirna, East Germany
- Height: 1.83 m (6 ft 0 in)
- Weight: 96 kg (212 lb)

Sport
- Country: Germany
- Sport: Bobsleigh
- Events: Two-man, Four-man
- Club: SC Oberbärenburg
- Turned pro: 2006
Medal record
Men's bobsleigh
Representing Germany
Olympic Games
Gold medal – first place	2018 Pyeongchang	Two-man
Gold medal – first place	2018 Pyeongchang	Four-man
Gold medal – first place	2022 Beijing	Two-man
Gold medal – first place	2022 Beijing	Four-man
Silver medal – second place	2026 Milano Cortina	Two-man
Silver medal – second place	2026 Milano Cortina	Four-man
World Championships
Gold medal – first place	2011 Königssee	Mixed team
Gold medal – first place	2013 St. Moritz	Two-man
Gold medal – first place	2015 Winterberg	Two-man
Gold medal – first place	2015 Winterberg	Mixed team
Gold medal – first place	2016 Igls	Two-man
Gold medal – first place	2017 Königssee	Two-man
Gold medal – first place	2017 Königssee	Four-man
Gold medal – first place	2019 Whistler	Two-man
Gold medal – first place	2019 Whistler	Four-man
Gold medal – first place	2020 Altenberg	Two-man
Gold medal – first place	2020 Altenberg	Four-man
Gold medal – first place	2021 Altenberg	Two-man
Gold medal – first place	2021 Altenberg	Four-man
Gold medal – first place	2023 St. Moritz	Four-man
Gold medal – first place	2024 Winterberg	Two-man
Gold medal – first place	2024 Winterberg	Four-man
Gold medal – first place	2025 Lake Placid	Two-man
Gold medal – first place	2025 Lake Placid	Four-man
Silver medal – second place	2013 St. Moritz	Mixed team
Silver medal – second place	2016 Igls	Four-man
Silver medal – second place	2023 St. Moritz	Two-man
European Championships
Gold medal – first place	2015 La Plagne	Two-man
Gold medal – first place	2017 Winterberg	Two-man
Gold medal – first place	2018 Igls	Two-man
Gold medal – first place	2019 Königssee	Two-man
Gold medal – first place	2021 Winterberg	Two-man
Gold medal – first place	2021 Winterberg	Four-man
Gold medal – first place	2022 St. Moritz	Two-man
Gold medal – first place	2024 Igls	Four-man
Gold medal – first place	2025 Lillehammer	Two-man
Silver medal – second place	2015 La Plagne	Four-man
Silver medal – second place	2018 Igls	Four-man
Silver medal – second place	2020 Winterberg	Four-man
Silver medal – second place	2022 St. Moritz	Four-man
Silver medal – second place	2023 Altenberg	Four-man
Silver medal – second place	2025 Lillehammer	Four-man
Silver medal – second place	2026 St. Moritz	Two-man
Bronze medal – third place	2013 Igls	Two-man
Bronze medal – third place	2014 Königssee	Four-man
Bronze medal – third place	2019 Königssee	Four-man
Bronze medal – third place	2023 Altenberg	Two-man

Francesco Friedrich (born 2 May 1990) is a German bobsledder who has been active since 2006. At the 2018 Winter Olympics in Pyeongchang, South Korea, he and his brakeman Thorsten Margis tied with Canada's Justin Kripps and Alexander Kopacz for the gold medal in the two-man competition. Friedrich also won gold outright in the four-man event alongside Margis, Candy Bauer and Martin Grothkopp, making Friedrich the fifth German pilot to win two-man and four-man golds at the same Games, after Andreas Ostler in 1952, Meinhard Nehmer in 1976, Wolfgang Hoppe in 1984 and André Lange in 2006. At the 2022 Winter Olympics in Beijing, China, Friedrich and Margis again won the gold medal with both sleighs. Friedrich previously competed at the 2014 Winter Olympics in the doubles and fours and finished in eighth and tenth place, respectively.

He is the most successful athlete of the IBSF World Championships winning his first gold medal in the 2011 Königssee mixed team event. Between 2017 and 2021, he won all IBSF World Championships, two-man and four-man, increasing his number of titles to 13.

== Career results ==
=== Olympic Games ===
Event	Two-man	Four-man
Representing Germany
(Russia) 2014 Sochi	6th (Note: Improved 2 ranks after disqualification of Russian bobs)	8th
(South Korea) 2018 Pyeongchang	1st (Note: Shared gold with Justin Kripps.)	1st
(China) 2022 Beijing	1st	1st
(Italy) 2026 Milano Cortina	2nd	2nd

=== World Championships ===
Event	Two-man	Four-man	Team
Representing Germany
(Germany) 2011 Königssee	11th	–	1st
(United States) 2012 Lake Placid	4th	9th	–
(Switzerland) 2013 St. Moritz	1st	13th	2nd
(Germany) 2015 Winterberg	1st	4th	1st
(Austria) 2016 Innsbruck	1st	2nd	–
(Germany) 2017 Königssee	1st	1st (Note: Shared gold with Johannes Lochner.)	–
(Canada) 2019 Whistler	1st	1st	–
(Germany) 2020 Altenberg	1st	1st	
(Germany) 2021 Altenberg	1st	1st	
(Switzerland) 2023 St. Moritz	2nd	1st	
(Germany) 2024 Winterberg	1st	1st	
(United States) 2025 Lake Placid	1st	1st	

=== Bobsleigh World Cup ===
==== Two-man ====
Season	Place	Points	1	2	3	4	5	6	7	8	9	10	11	12
2011–12	27th	304	–	–	–	–	–	DSQ	11	7	—N/a	—N/a	—N/a	—N/a
2012–13	6th	1369	3	3	3	–	–	1	3	3	10	—N/a	—N/a	—N/a
2013–14	3rd	1400	6	3	7	9	5	3	4	12	—N/a	—N/a	—N/a	—N/a
2014–15	4th	1429	1	2	5	7	4	1	1	—	—N/a	—N/a	—N/a	—N/a
2015–16	6th	1275	1	1	1	8	DNF	16	10	3	—N/a	—N/a	—N/a	—N/a
2016–17	1st	1545	1	—	1	1	2	2	1	1	—N/a	—N/a	—N/a	—N/a
2017–18	2nd	1504	9	9	13	2	1	2	2	1	—N/a	—N/a	—N/a	—N/a
2018–19	1st	1800	1	1	1	1	1	1	1	1	—N/a	—N/a	—N/a	—N/a
2019–20	1st	1530	2	1	1	1	1	2	2	—	—N/a	—N/a	—N/a	—N/a
2020–21	1st	2685	1	1	1	1	2	1	1	1	1	1	1	1
2021–22	1st	1703	1	1	1	1	12	1	1	1	—N/a	—N/a	—N/a	—N/a
2022–23	2nd	1656	1	1	2	6	3	3	2	2	—N/a	—N/a	—N/a	—N/a
2023–24	1st	1675	2	3	2	2	2	3	2	1	—N/a			
2024–25	3rd	1520	DSQ	1	3	1	1	2	1	2	—N/a			
2025–26	2nd	1465	2	2	1	2	3	2	3	—N/a				

==== Four-man ====
Season	Place	Points	1	2	3	4	5	6	7	8	9
2011–12	27th	272	–	–	–	–	–	10	–	12	—N/a
2012–13	19th	624	5	13	10	–	–	–	–	–	6
2013–14	7th	1400	13	15	14	2	2	11	9	5	—N/a
2014–15	5th	1310	14	2	6	4	2	3	2	—	—N/a
2015–16	2nd	1570	1	1	4	6	7	4	4	3	—N/a
2016–17	7th	1224	12	—	3	5	3	5	4	11	—N/a
2017–18	2nd	1468	9	4	12	3	3	2	2	6	—N/a
2018–19	1st	1727	2	1	1	3	1	1	4	1	—N/a
2019–20	1st	1686	4	3	1	2	1	1	1	5	—N/a
2020–21	1st	900	1	1	1	1	—N/a	—N/a	—N/a	—N/a	—N/a
2021–22	1st	1785	1	1	1	1	1	1	1	2	—N/a
2022–23	1st	1737	1	1	2	1	4	2	1	1	—N/a
2023–24	1st	1745	2	3	1	1	2	1	1	1	—N/a
2024–25	1st	1515	1	2	1	1	2	St. Moritz 3	2	2	—N/a
2025–26	2nd	1446	2	1	2	3	1	6	3	—N/a	
