= Bruno Aeberhard =

Swiss bobsleigher (born 1976)

Personal information
- Born: 14 October 1976 (age 49)

Sport
- Country: Switzerland
- Sport: Bobsleigh
- Event: Four-man
Medal record
Men's bobsleigh
Representing Switzerland
World Championships
Bronze medal – third place	2000 Altenberg	Four-man

Bruno Aeberhard (born 14 October 1976) is a Swiss bobsleigher who competed from the late 1990s to 2005. He won a bronze medal in the four-man event at the 2000 FIBT World Championships in Altenberg.

== Personal life ==
Aeberhard's brother, Urs, is a former Olympic bobsledder. His nephew, Mario Aeberhard, is an Olympic bobsledder.
