= Urs Aeberhard =

Swiss bobsledder

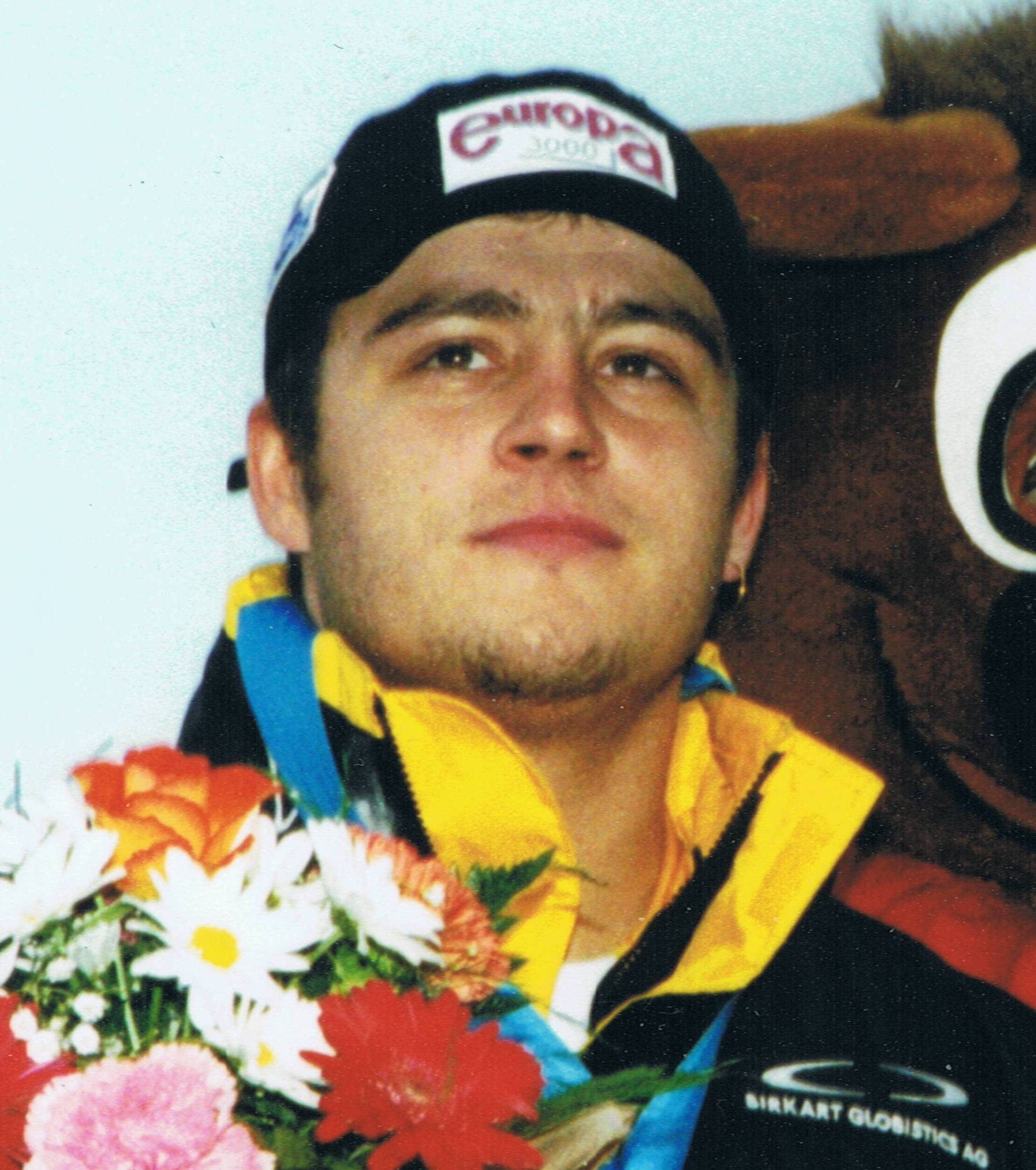

Personal information
- Born: 18 February 1971 (age 55) Zug, Switzerland

Sport
- Country: Switzerland
- Sport: Bobsleigh
- Events: Two-man, four-man
Medal record
Men's bobsleigh
Representing Switzerland
World Championships
Bronze medal – third place	2000 Altenberg	Two-man
Bronze medal – third place	2000 Altenberg	Four-man
Bronze medal – third place	2001 St. Moritz	Four-man

Urs Aeberhard (born 18 February 1971) is a Swiss bobsledder who competed from the late 1990s to the early 2000s.

== Career ==
He won three bronze medals at the FIBT World Championships (Two-man: 2000, Four-man: 2000, FIBT World Championships 2001).

Aeberhard also finished sixth in the four-man event at Salt Lake City in 2002.

== Personal life ==
Aeberhard's son, Mario Aeberhard, is an Olympic bobsledder. His brother, Bruno, is also a former bobsledder.
