= Issam Ammour =

German bobsledder (born 1993)

Personal information
- Born: 14 April 1993 (age 33) Germany
- Height: 1.72 m (5 ft 8 in)
- Weight: 102 kg (225 lb)
- Relative: Adam Ammour (brother)

Sport
- Country: Germany
- Sport: Bobsleigh
- Event(s): Two-man, four-man
- Coached by: René Spies
Medal record
Men's bobsleigh
Representing Germany
World Championships
Silver medal – second place	2024 Winterberg	Two-man
Bronze medal – third place	2024 Winterberg	Four-man
Bronze medal – third place	2025 Lake Placid	Two-man
European Championships
Gold medal – first place	2024 Sigulda	Two-man
Gold medal – first place	2026 St. Moritz	Four-man

Issam Ammour (born 14 April 1993) is a German bobsledder. He represented Germany at the 2026 Winter Olympics.

== Career ==
Ammour and his brother, Adam, competed as a team together for the first time during the 2023–24 Bobsleigh World Cup.

In February 2024, Ammour represented Germany at the IBSF European Championships 2024 and won a gold medal in the two-man event, along with his brother, Adam. He then competed at the IBSF World Championships 2024 and won a silver medal in the two-man event, and a bronze medal in the four-man event.

He competed at the IBSF European Championships 2026 and won a gold medal in the four-man event, along with Adam Ammour, Joshua Tasche and Alexander Schaller. During their second race run, they set a St. Moritz-Celerina Olympic Bobrun track record with a time of 1:04.47.

He represented Germany at the 2026 Winter Olympics in the four-man event and finished in fourth place with a time of 3:38.68.

== World Championships results ==
Event	Two-man	Four-man
(Germany) 2024 Winterberg	2nd	3rd
(United States) 2025 Lake Placid	3rd	5th

== Personal life ==
Ammour was born in Germany to an Algerian father and French mother. His younger brother, Adam, is also a bobsledder.
