= IBSF European Championships 2026 =

European Bobsleigh and Skeleton Championships

2026 European Championships
- Venue: St. Moritz-Celerina Olympic Bobrun
- Location: (Switzerland) St. Moritz
- Dates: 9–11 January

The 2026 IBSF European Championships were held from 9 to 11 January 2026 in St. Moritz, Switzerland.

== Schedule ==
Seven events are planned.

All times are local (UTC+1).

Skeleton

Date	Time	Events
9 January	8:30	Women run 1 & 2
9 January	12:00	Men run 1 & 2
9 January	16:00	Mixed team

Bobsleigh

Date	Time	Events
10 January	9:00	Women's Monobob run 1 & 2
10 January	13:00	Two-men run 1 & 2
11 January	9:00	Two-women run 1 & 2
11 January	13:00	Four-men run 1 & 2

== Medal summary ==
=== Medal table ===
* Host nation (Switzerland)

Rank	Nation	Gold	Silver	Bronze	Total
1	Germany	3	3	4	10
2	Switzerland*	2	0	1	3
3	Great Britain	1	1	2	4
4	Belgium	1	0	0	1
5	Italy	0	2	0	2
6	Austria	0	1	0	1
Totals (6 entries)		7	7	7	21

=== Skeleton ===
Event	Gold		Silver		Bronze	
Women	Kim Meylemans; Belgium	2:21.01	Tabitha Stoecker; Great Britain	2:22.23	Jacqueline Pfeifer; Germany	2:22.25
Men	Matt Weston; Great Britain	2:16.58	Amedeo Bagnis; Italy	2:17.49	Christopher Grotheer; Germany	2:17.71
Mixed team	Germany 2 Susanne Kreher; Axel Jungk	2:26.25	Italy 1 Alessandra Fumagalli; Amedeo Bagnis	2:26.45	Great Britain 2 Freya Tarbit; Jacob Salisbury	2:26.65

=== Bobsleigh ===
Event	Gold		Silver		Bronze	
Women's Monobob	Melanie Hasler; Switzerland	2:23.80	Katrin Beierl; Austria	2:23.95	Laura Nolte; Germany	2:24.12
Two-woman	Switzerland; Melanie Hasler; Nadja Pasternack	2:18.41	Germany; Laura Nolte; Leonie Kluwig	2:18.43	Germany; Kim Kalicki; Talea Prepens	2:18.63
Two-man	Germany; Johannes Lochner; Georg Fleischhauer	2:12.24	Germany; Francesco Friedrich; Alexander Schüller	2:13.02	Great Britain; Brad Hall; Taylor Lawrence	2:13.43
Four-man	Germany; Adam Ammour; Issam Ammour; Joshua Tasche; Alexander Schaller	2:09.51	Germany; Johannes Lochner; Thorsten Margis; Jörn Wenzel; Georg Fleischhauer	2:09.58	Switzerland; Michael Vogt; Dominik Hufschmid; Andreas Haas; Amadou David Ndiaye	2:10.06

== See also ==
- Bobsleigh and Skeleton European Championship
