= Daiyehan Nichols-Bardi =

Austria bobsledder (born 2001)

Personal information
- Nationality: Austrian
- Born: 13 March 2001 (age 25) Lagos, Nigeria
- Height: 182 cm (6 ft 0 in)
- Weight: 93 kg (205 lb)

Sport
- Country: Austria
- Sport: Bobsleigh
- Events: Two-man, Four-man
Medal record
Men's bobsleigh
Representing Austria
Junior European Championships
Silver medal – second place	2024 Innsbruck	Four-man
Junior World Championships U23
Silver medal – second place	2022 Innsbruck	Four-man
Silver medal – second place	2023 Winterberg	Four-man
Bronze medal – third place	2022 Innsbruck	Two-man

Daiyehan Nichols-Bardi (born 13 March 2001) is a Nigerian-born Austrian bobsledder. He represented Austria at the 2026 Winter Olympics.

== Career ==
Nichols-Bardi began his sports career in track and field, where he was a sprinter for the Union St. Pölten club. During this time he participated in the 2018 European Athletics U18 Championships. Nichols-Bardi was considered a strong hope to be a leading sprinter for Austria, but after a disappointing season in 2020/21, Nicholas-Bardi decided to leave athletics, and instead turn to bobsleigh.

Nichols-Bardi began competing in bobsleigh at the end of 2021, pushing for the team of Jakob Mandlbauer. In 2022, Nichols-Bardi earned a silver and bronze medal in four-man and two-man, respectively, in the Under-23 Junior World Championships pushing for Mandlbauer. In 2023, the team earned silver in the four-man in the same event. In 2024, he earned a silver medal pushing for Mandlbauer in the Junior European Championships.

Nichols-Bardi was selected to represent Austria at the 2026 Winter Olympics, where he pushed for Jakob Mandlbauer in both two-man and four-man. In two-man, the team finished 21st. In four-man, the team crashed during their second run, and did not finish the event.

== Bobsleigh results ==
All results are sourced from the International Bobsleigh and Skeleton Federation (IBSF).

=== Olympic Games ===
Event	Two-man	Four-man
(Italy) 2026 Milano Cortina	21st	DNF

=== World Championships ===
Event	Two-man	Four-man
(Switzerland) 2023 St. Moritz	23rd	—
(Germany) 2024 Winterberg	18th	17th
(United States) 2025 Lake Placid	—	DNF
