= Alexander Schaller =

German bobsledder (born 2002)

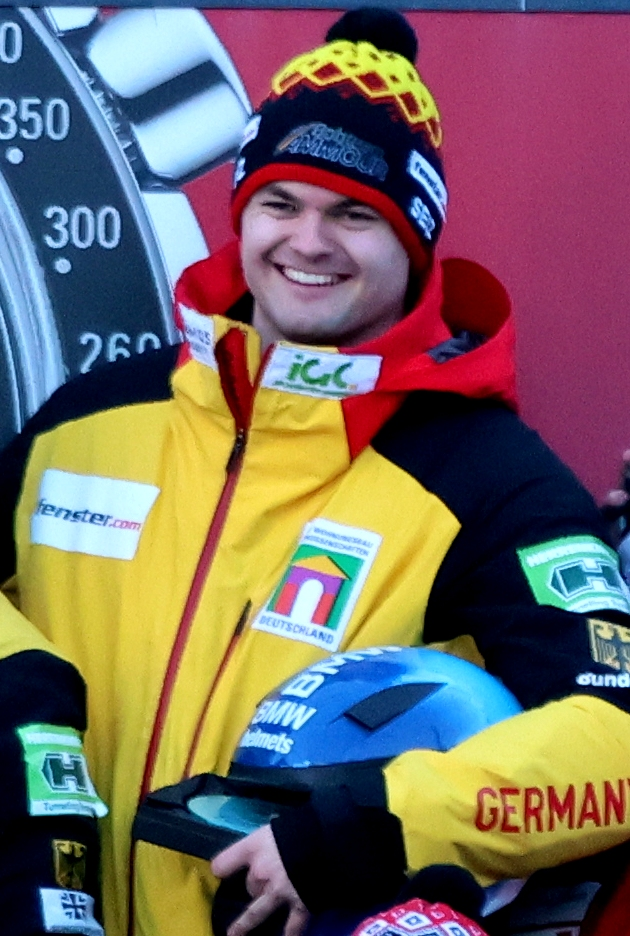
- Schaller in 2026

Personal information
- Born: 16 September 2002 (age 23)
- Height: 1.91 m (6 ft 3 in)
- Weight: 97 kg (214 lb)

Sport
- Country: Germany
- Sport: Bobsleigh
- Event(s): Two-man, four-man
Medal record
Men's bobsleigh
Representing Germany
Olympic Games
| Bronze medal – third place | 2026 Milano Cortina | Two-man |
European Championships
| Gold medal – first place | 2026 St. Moritz | Four-man |

Alexander Schaller (born 16 September 2002) is a German bobsledder. He represented Germany at the 2026 Winter Olympics.

== Career ==
During the opening race of the 2025–26 Bobsleigh World Cup, Schaller earned his first career World Cup podium, finishing in third place in the two-man event, along with Adam Ammour. He competed at the IBSF European Championships 2026 and won a gold medal in the four-man event, along with Adam Ammour, Issam Ammour and Joshua Tasche. During their second race run, they set a St. Moritz-Celerina Olympic Bobrun track record with a time of 1:04.47.

He represented Germany at the 2026 Winter Olympics and won a bronze medal in the two-man event, along with Ammour, in a German podium sweep. He then competed in the four-man event and finished in fourth place with a time of 3:38.68.
