= Alexander Schüller =

German bobsledder (born 1997)

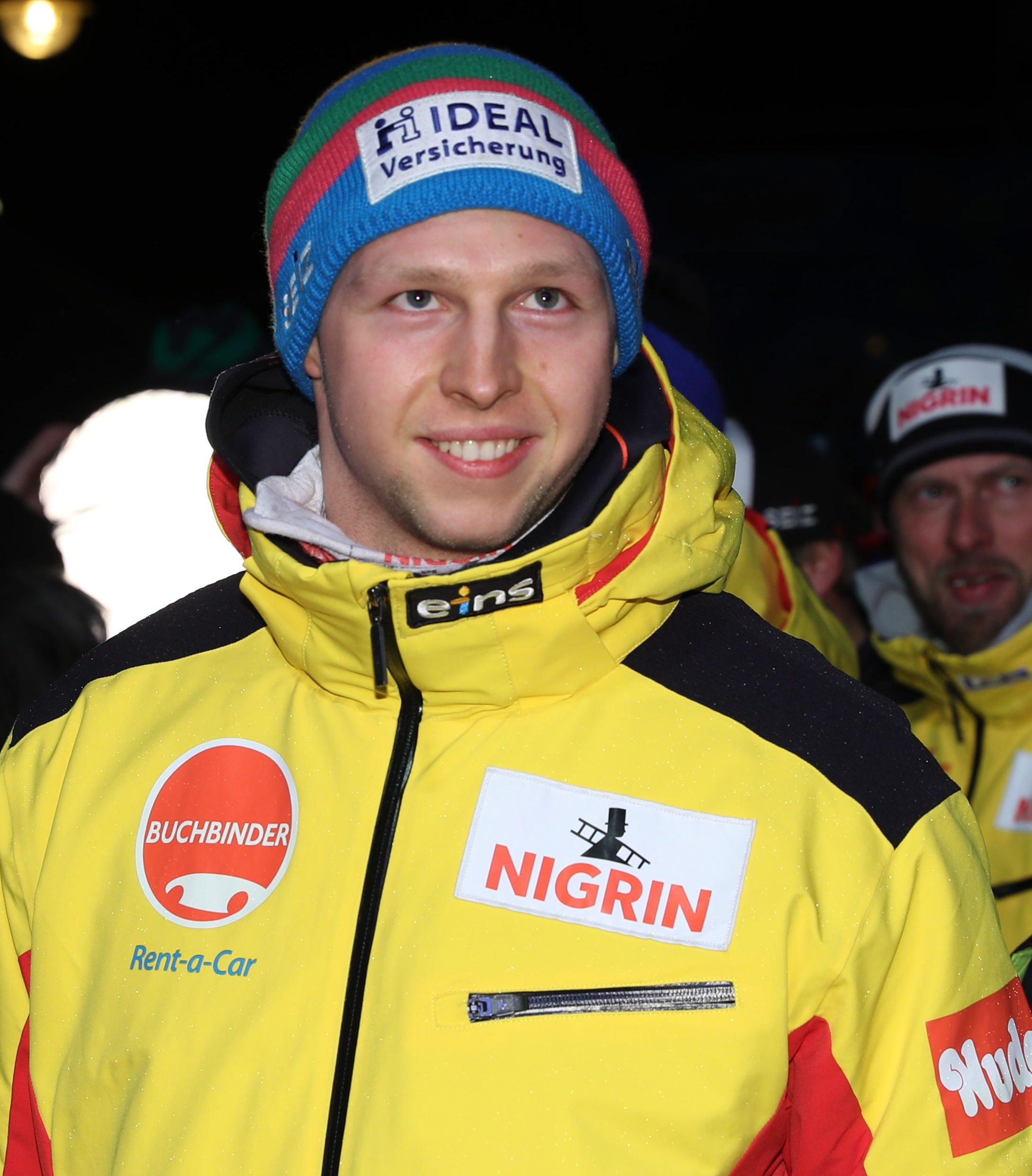
- Schüller in 2020

Personal information
- Nationality: German
- Born: 13 May 1997 (age 29) Leipzig, Germany
- Height: 1.93 m (6 ft 4 in)
- Weight: 102 kg (225 lb)

Sport
- Country: Germany
- Sport: Bobsleigh
- Event: Four-man
- Club: SV Halle
Medal record
Men's bobsleigh
Representing Germany
Olympic Games
Gold medal – first place	2022 Beijing	Four-man
Silver medal – second place	2026 Milano Cortina	Two-man
Silver medal – second place	2026 Milano Cortina	Four-man
World Championships
Gold medal – first place	2020 Altenberg	Four-man
Gold medal – first place	2021 Altenberg	Two-man
Gold medal – first place	2021 Altenberg	Four-man
Gold medal – first place	2023 St. Moritz	Four-man
Gold medal – first place	2024 Winterberg	Two-man
Gold medal – first place	2024 Winterberg	Four-man
Gold medal – first place	2025 Lake Placid	Two-man
Gold medal – first place	2025 Lake Placid	Four-man
Silver medal – second place	2023 St. Moritz	Two-man
European Championships
Gold medal – first place	2021 Winterberg	Four-man
Gold medal – first place	2024 Igls	Four-man
Gold medal – first place	2025 Lillehammer	Two-man
Silver medal – second place	2020 Winterberg	Four-man
Silver medal – second place	2022 St. Moritz	Four-man
Silver medal – second place	2025 Lillehammer	Four-man
Silver medal – second place	2026 St. Moritz	Two-man
Bronze medal – third place	2019 Königssee	Four-man
Bronze medal – third place	2023 Altenberg	Two-man

Alexander Schüller (born 13 May 1997) is a German bobsledder. He competed for Germany at the 2022 and 2026 Winter Olympics.

== Career ==
He won his first World Championship at the IBSF World Championships 2020. At the IBSF World Championships 2021 and the IBSF World Championships 2024 he won both, the gold medal in the two-man and in the four-man sleigh.

== Career results ==
=== World Championships ===
Event	Two-man	Four-man	Team
(Germany) 2017 Königssee	23rd	—	—
(Germany) 2020 Altenberg	—	1st	
(Germany) 2021 Altenberg	1st	1st	
(Switzerland) 2023 St. Moritz	2nd	2nd	

=== Winter Olympics ===
Event	Two-man	Four-man
(China) 2022 Beijing	—	1st
(Italy) 2026 Milano Cortina	2nd	2nd
