= Mario Aeberhard =

Swiss bobsledder (born 2005)

Personal information
- Born: 3 November 2005 (age 20) Jegenstorf, Switzerland
- Height: 178 cm (5 ft 10 in)
- Weight: 86 kg (190 lb)

Sport
- Country: Switzerland
- Sport: Bobsleigh
- Event: Four-man
- Coached by: Andreas Baumann
Medal record
Men's bobsleigh
Representing Switzerland
Olympic Games
Bronze medal – third place	2026 Milano Cortina	Four-man

Mario Aeberhard (born 3 November 2005) is a Swiss bobsledder. He represented Switzerland at the 2026 Winter Olympics.

== Career ==
Aeberhard started early with athletics (STV Einsiedeln) later on he switched to bobsleight to follow his Father. Aeberhard competed at the IBSF Junior World Championships 2025 and won a silver medal in the U23 classification.

In January 2026, he was selected to represent Switzerland at the 2026 Winter Olympics. He won a bronze medal in the four-man event with a time of 3:38.64. This marked Switzerland's first medal in bobsled since 2014, and first medal in the four-man event in 20 years.

== Personal life ==
Aeberhard's father, Urs Aeberhard, is a former Olympic bobsledder. He is the nephew of Bruno Aeberhard.
