= Adam Ammour =

German bobsledder (born 2001)

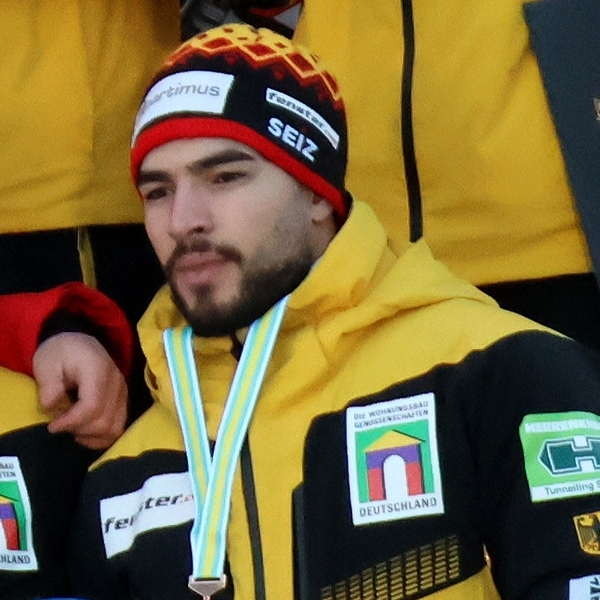
- Ammour in 2025

Personal information
- Born: 7 June 2001 (age 25) Germany
- Height: 1.75 m (5 ft 9 in)
- Weight: 80 kg (176 lb)
- Relative: Issam Ammour (brother)

Sport
- Country: Germany
- Sport: Bobsleigh
- Events: Two-man, four-man
- Coached by: René Spies
Medal record
Men's bobsleigh
Representing Germany
Olympic Games
Bronze medal – third place	2026 Milano Cortina	Two-man
World Championships
Silver medal – second place	2024 Winterberg	Two-man
Bronze medal – third place	2024 Winterberg	Four-man
Bronze medal – third place	2025 Lake Placid	Two-man
European Championships
Gold medal – first place	2024 Sigulda	Two-man
Gold medal – first place	2026 St. Moritz	Four-man

Adam Ammour (born 7 June 2001) is a German bobsledder.

== Career ==
Ammour and his brother, Issam, competed as a team together for the first time during the 2023–24 Bobsleigh World Cup.

In February 2024, Ammour represented Germany at the IBSF European Championships 2024 and won a gold medal in the two-man event, along with his brother, Issam. He then competed at the IBSF World Championships 2024 and won a silver medal in the two-man event, and a bronze medal in the four-man event. He again competed at the IBSF World Championships 2025 and won a bronze medal in the two-man event, along with Benedikt Hertel.

He competed at the IBSF European Championships 2026 and won a gold medal in the four-man event, along with Issam Ammour, Joshua Tasche and Alexander Schaller. During their second race run, they set a St. Moritz-Celerina Olympic Bobrun track record with a time of 1:04.47.

He represented Germany at the 2026 Winter Olympics and won a bronze medal in the two-man event, along with Schaller, in a German podium sweep. He then competed in the four-man event and finished in fourth place with a time of 3:38.68.

== World Championships results ==
Event	Two-man	Four-man
(Switzerland) 2023 St. Moritz	DNF	—N/a
(Germany) 2024 Winterberg	2nd	3rd
(United States) 2025 Lake Placid	3rd	5th

== Personal life ==
Ammour was born in Germany to an Algerian father and French mother. His older brother, Issam, is also a bobsledder. He is Muslim and fasted for the 2026 Winter Olympics.
