= Georg Fleischhauer =

German hurdler and bobsledder (born 1988)

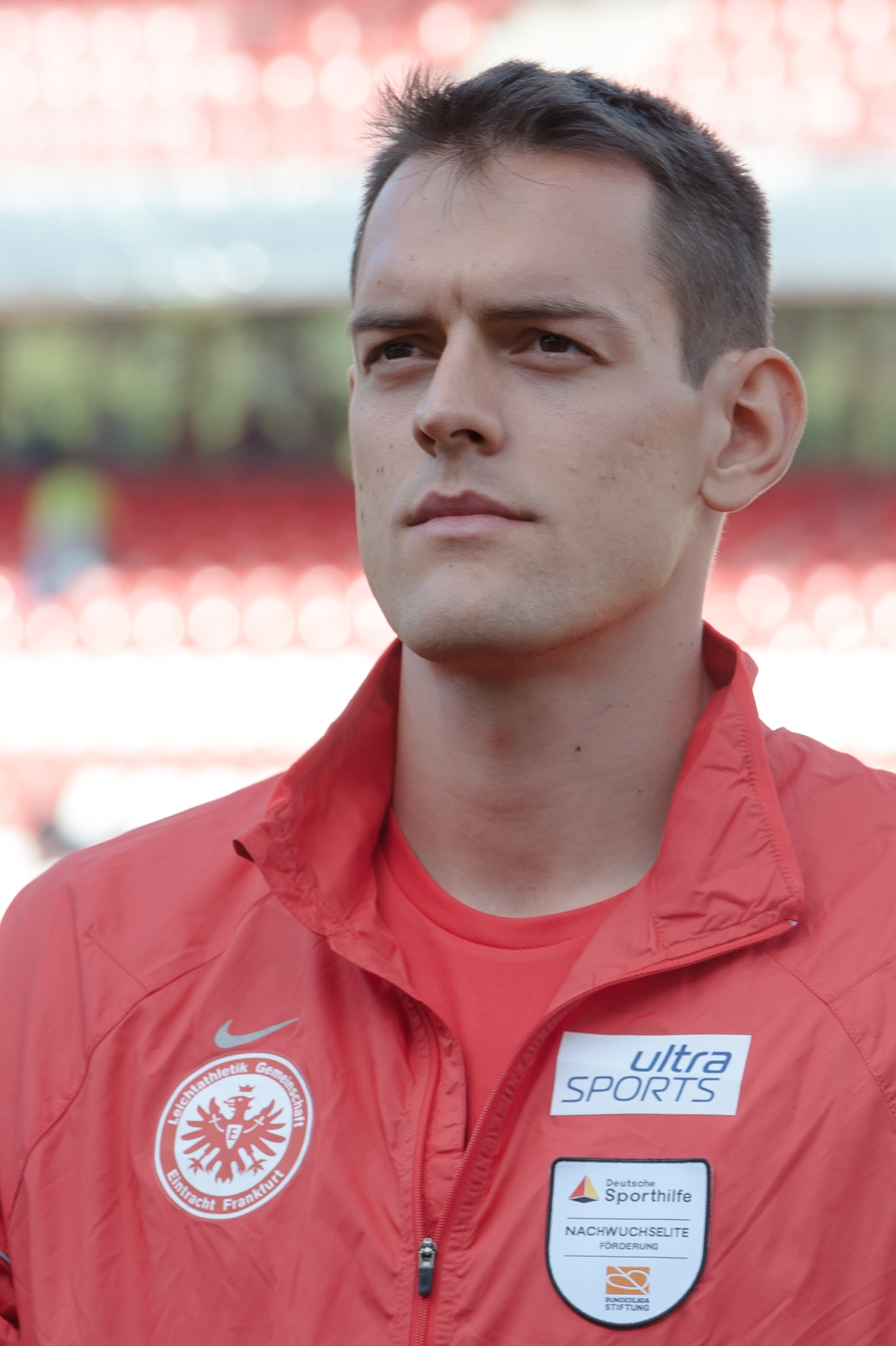

Personal information
- Nationality: German
- Born: 21 October 1988 (age 37) Halberstadt, East Germany
- Height: 1.95 m (6 ft 5 in)
- Weight: 100 kg (220 lb)

Sport
- Country: Germany
- Sport: Bobsleigh
- Event: Two-man
Medal record
Men's bobsleigh
Representing Germany
Olympic Games
| Gold medal – first place | 2026 Milano Cortina | Two-man |
| Gold medal – first place | 2026 Milano Cortina | Four-man |
World Championships
| Gold medal – first place | 2023 St. Moritz | Two-man |
| Silver medal – second place | 2024 Winterberg | Four-man |
| Silver medal – second place | 2025 Lake Placid | Two-man |
| Silver medal – second place | 2025 Lake Placid | Four-man |
| Bronze medal – third place | 2024 Winterberg | Two-man |
European Championships
| Gold medal – first place | 2025 Lillehammer | Four-man |
| Gold medal – first place | 2026 St. Moritz | Two-man |
| Silver medal – second place | 2024 Igls | Four-man |
| Silver medal – second place | 2025 Lillehammer | Two-man |
| Silver medal – second place | 2026 St. Moritz | Four-man |

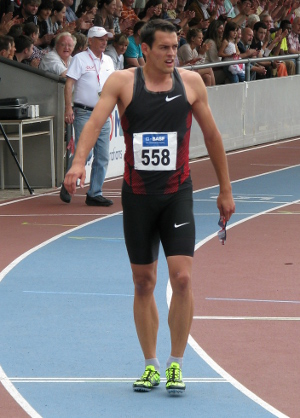
Fleischhauer in 2011

Georg Fleischhauer (born 21 October 1988) is a German track and field athlete who specialises in the 400 metres hurdles and bobsledder. Among his most significant achievements are the gold medals with Johannes Lochner in two-man bobsleigh at the Olympic Games 2026 and the World Championships in 2023.

== Track and Field ==
Fleischhauer started as a track and field athlete, initially competing in the 110 metres hurdles and later in the 400 metres hurdles. His biggest achievements include winning the German championship twice (2010, 2012), reaching the semi-finals at the 2011 World Championships, and finishing sixth at the 2012 European Championships.

== Bobsleigh ==
Fleischhauer has been active in bobsleigh since 2019, initially competing as brakeman for Max Illmann in Eurocup. Since May 2022 Fleischhauer started training under Kevin Kuske in Potsdam. In 2022 he joined Johannes Lochner's team for the world cup season. In his first Worls Cup two-man bobsleigh appearance, he achieved his first World Cup victory at the Lake Placid track. In his first season with Johannes Lochner he won gold in two-man bobsleigh at the World Championships and secured the overall World Cup title in two-man bobsleigh.

Fleischhauer made his Olympic debut at the age of 37 in Cortina d'Ampezzo 2026. Together with Johannes Lochner they won the gold medal in two-man bobsleigh.

== Personal ==
Fleischhauer graduated with a M.Sc. in Industrial Engineering from TU Dresden. Since 2016 he is working as a consultant in a large consulting firm.

Fleischhauer’s mother died in 2022, shortly before his successful World Cup debut in bobsleigh. He later stated that this period was mentally challenging. Fleischhauer dedicated his first overall World Cup title to his mother.

== Bobsleigh results ==
All results are sourced from the International Bobsleigh and Skeleton Federation (IBSF).

=== World Championships ===
| Event | Two-man | Four-man |
|---|---|---|
| (Switzerland) 2023 St. Moritz | 1st | 4th |
| (Germany) 2024 Winterberg | 3rd | 2nd |
| (United States) 2025 Lake Placid | 2nd | 2nd |

== Track and Field results ==
| Year | Competition | Venue | Position | Event | Notes |
|---|---|---|---|---|---|
| 2011 | European Team Championships | Stockholm, Sweden | 2nd | 400 metres hurdles | 49.56 |
| 2012 | European Championships | Helsinki, Finland | 6th | 400 metres hurdles | 50.11 |
