= Patrick Baumgartner =

Italian bobsledder (born 1994)

Personal information
- Nationality: Italy
- Born: 27 December 1994 (age 31) Bruneck, Italy
- Height: 1.88 m (6 ft 2 in)
- Weight: 92 kg (203 lb)

Sport
- Sport: Bobsleigh
Medal record
Men's skeleton
Representing the Italy
Youth Olympic Games
Gold medal – first place	2012 Innsbruck	Two boys

Patrick Baumgartner (born 27 December 1994) is an Italian bobsledder who competed at the 2022 Winter Olympics. He was the Youth Olympic champion in the 2012 Innsbruck Two-boys event.
