= Martin Kranz =

Liechtenstein bobsledder (born 2002)

Personal information
- National team: Liechtenstein
- Born: 28 November 2002 (age 23) Vaduz, Liechtenstein

Sport
- Country: Liechtenstein

Martin Kranz (born 28 November 2002) is a Liechtensteiner bobsledder.

Kranz has competed in the IBSF World Championships two-man bobsledding between 2020 and 2024. He is represented Liechtenstein at the 2026 Winter Olympics as a bobsledding pilot, and was also the country's flagbearer during the opening ceremony.

He is from Vaduz.
