= Michael Vogt =

Swiss bobsledder (born 1997)

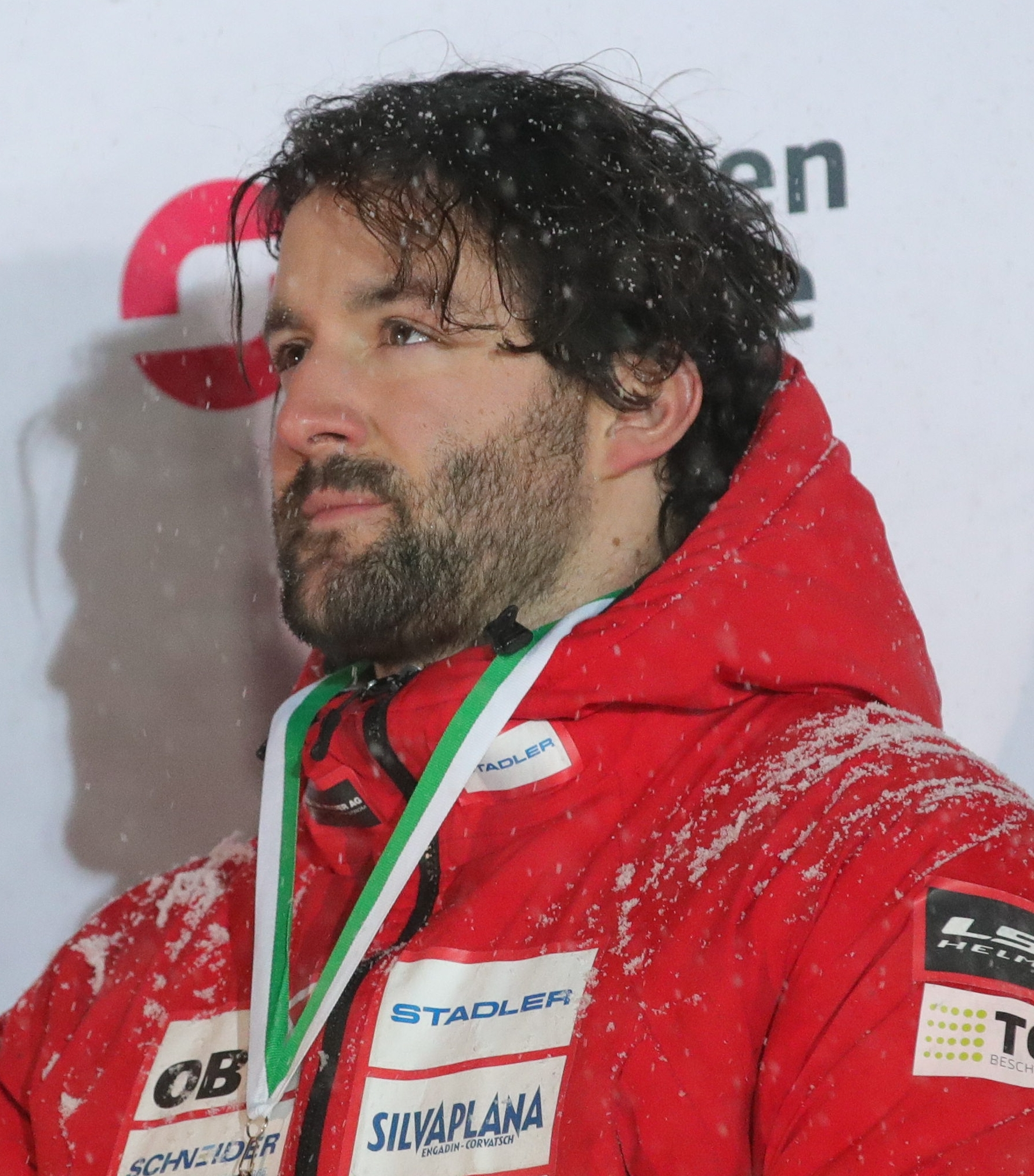
- Vogt in 2023

Personal information
- Nationality: Swiss
- Born: 29 December 1997 (age 28) Wangen, Switzerland
- Height: 1.85 m (6 ft 1 in)
- Weight: 100 kg (220 lb)

Sport
- Country: Switzerland
- Sport: Bobsleigh
- Event(s): Two-man, Four-man
- Club: Spitzensportler der Armee, Polymechaniker
- Turned pro: 2016
Medal record
Men's bobsleigh
Representing Switzerland
Olympic Games
Bronze medal – third place	2026 Milano Cortina	Four-man
World Championships
Bronze medal – third place	2023 St. Moritz	Two-man
European Championships
Silver medal – second place	2023 Altenberg	Two-man
Silver medal – second place	2024 Sigulda	Two-man
Bronze medal – third place	2023 Altenberg	Four-man
Bronze medal – third place	2025 Lillehammer	Four-man
Bronze medal – third place	2026 St. Moritz	Four-man

Michael Vogt (born 29 December 1997) is a Swiss bobsledder who competed at the 2022 and 2026 Winter Olympics. Vogt won a bronze medal in the four-man event at the 2026 Olympics.

== Career ==
At the 2023 European Championships he won a silver medal in the two-man event, along with pusher Sandro Michel, and a bronze medal in the four-man event. He was the junior world champion in 2021. In 2023, Swiss newspaper Le Temps praised his "athletic qualities and technical finesse".

He represented Switzerland at the 2026 Winter Olympics and won a bronze medal in the four-man event with a time of 3:38.64. This marked Switzerland's first medal in bobsled since 2014, and first medal in the four-man in 20 years.

== Bobsleigh results ==
All results are sourced from the International Bobsleigh and Skeleton Federation (IBSF).

=== Olympic Games ===
Event	Two-man	Four-man
(China) 2022 Beijing	4th	11th
(Italy) 2026 Milano Cortina	6th	3rd

=== World Championships ===
Event	Two-man	Four-man
(Canada) 2019 Whistler	13th	–
(Germany) 2020 Altenberg	8th	–
(Germany) 2021 Altenberg	5th	13th
(Switzerland) 2023 St. Moritz	3rd	5th
(United States) 2025 Lake Placid	5th	6th

== Personal life ==
Vogt trained as a polymechanic and is from Wangen, Schwyz, Switzerland. As of January 2024, he was dating fellow Swiss bobsleigh pilot Melanie Hasler.
