= IBSF World Championships 2024 =

Bobsleigh and skeleton championships in Germany

- Venue: Winterberg bobsleigh, luge, and skeleton track
- Location: Winterberg, Germany
- Dates: 18 February – 3 March

The 2024 IBSF World Championships were held in Winterberg, Germany from 18 February to 3 March 2024.

== Schedule ==
Seven events were held.

All times are local (UTC+1).

Bobsleigh

Date	Time	Events
24 February	09:00	Women's Monobob run 1
24 February	13:30	Women's Monobob run 2
24 February	13:00	Two-man run 1
24 February	14:45	Two-man run 2
25 February	09:15	Women's Monobob run 3
25 February	10:45	Women's Monobob run 4
25 February	13:15	Two-man run 3
25 February	15:00	Two-man run 4
1 March	15:00	Two-woman run 1
1 March	16:30	Two-woman run 2
2 March	10:00	Four-man run 1
2 March	12:00	Four-man run 2
2 March	14:30	Two-woman run 3
2 March	16:00	Two-woman run 4
3 March	14:00	Four-man run 3
3 March	16:00	Four-man run 4

Skeleton

Date	Time	Events
22 February	10:00	Women run 1
22 February	11:45	Women run 2
22 February	14:00	Men run 1
22 February	15:45	Men run 2
23 February	12:00	Women run 3
23 February	13:45	Women run 4
23 February	16:00	Men run 3
23 February	17:45	Men run 4
24 February	17:00	Skeleton mixed team

== Medal summary ==
=== Medal table ===
* Host nation (Germany)

Rank	Nation	Gold	Silver	Bronze	Total
1	Germany*	6	3	6	15
2	Canada	1	0	0	1
3	Great Britain	0	2	0	2
4	Belgium	0	1	0	1
4	United States	0	1	0	1
6	China	0	0	1	1
Totals (6 entries)		7	7	7	21

=== Bobsleigh ===
Event	Gold		Silver		Bronze	
Two-man	Germany; Francesco Friedrich; Alexander Schüller	3:38.27	Germany; Adam Ammour; Issam Ammour	3:38.61	Germany; Johannes Lochner; Georg Fleischhauer	3:38.74
Four-man	Germany; Francesco Friedrich; Thorsten Margis; Alexander Schüller; Felix Straub	3:34.10	Germany; Johannes Lochner; Florian Bauer; Erec Bruckert; Georg Fleischhauer	3:34.98	Germany; Adam Ammour; Issam Ammour; Benedikt Hertel; Rupert Schenk	3:35.31
Women's Monobob	Laura Nolte; Germany	3:54.77	Elana Meyers Taylor; United States	3:54.94	Lisa Buckwitz; Germany	3:55.00
Two-woman	Germany; Lisa Buckwitz; Vanessa Mark	3:43.99	Germany; Laura Nolte; Deborah Levi	3:44.04	Germany; Kim Kalicki; Leonie Fiebig	3:44.27

=== Skeleton ===
Event	Gold		Silver		Bronze	
Men	Christopher Grotheer; Germany	3:44.91	Matt Weston; Great Britain	3:45.14	Yin Zheng; China	3:45.92
Women	Hallie Clarke; Canada	3:51.27	Kim Meylemans; Belgium	3:51.49	Hannah Neise; Germany	3:51.53
Skeleton mixed team	Germany; Hannah Neise; Christopher Grotheer	1:59.09	Great Britain; Tabitha Stoecker; Matt Weston	1:59.21	Germany; Jacqueline Pfeifer; Axel Jungk	1:59.31
