= IBSF World Championships 2024 – Two-woman =

Two-woman at the IBSF World Championships 2024
- Venue: Winterberg bobsleigh, luge, and skeleton track
- Location: Winterberg, Germany
- Dates: 1 March (run 1–2); 2 March (run 3–4)
- Competitors: 49 from 14 nations
- Teams: 24
- Winning time: 3:43.99

Medalists
gold medal	Lisa Buckwitz; Vanessa Mark	Germany
silver medal	Laura Nolte; Deborah Levi	Germany
bronze medal	Kim Kalicki; Leonie Fiebig	Germany

The Two-woman competition at the IBSF World Championships 2024 was held on 1 and 2 March 2024.

== Results ==
The first two runs were started on 1 March at 15:04. The last two runs were held on 2 March at 14:30.

Rank	Bib	Country	Athletes	Run 1	Rank	Run 2	Rank	Run 3	Rank	Run 4	Rank	Total	Behind
1st place, gold medalist(s)	3	Germany	Lisa Buckwitz; Vanessa Mark	55.90	2	55.98	1	56.32	1	55.79	2	3:43.99	
2nd place, silver medalist(s)	1	Germany	Laura Nolte; Deborah Levi	55.93	3	55.99	2	56.37	2	55.75	1	3:44.04	+0.05
3rd place, bronze medalist(s)	2	Germany	Kim Kalicki; Leonie Fiebig	55.89	1	56.05	3	56.49	3	55.84	3	3:44.27	+0.28
4	11	United States	Kaysha Love; Azaria Hill	56.37	4	56.23	4	56.67	6	55.96	4	3:45.23	+1.24
5	9	Australia	Breeana Walker; Kiara Reddingius	56.38	5	56.24	5	56.65	4	56.16	6	3:45.43	+1.44
6	7	United States	Elana Meyers Taylor; Emily Renna	56.41	6	56.29	6	56.66	5	56.28	7	3:45.64	+1.65
7	4	Switzerland	Melanie Hasler; Mara Morell	56.68	10	56.44	7	57.03	12	56.15	5	3:46.30	+2.31
8	10	Canada	Cynthia Appiah; Leah Walkeden	56.67	9	56.52	10	56.89	7	56.28	7	3:46.36	+2.37
9	15	Canada	Bianca Ribi; Niamh Haughey	56.69	12	56.51	9	56.89	7	56.28	7	3:46.37	+2.38
10	8	Romania	Andreea Grecu; Teodora Vlad	56.68	10	56.52	10	56.91	9	56.37	11	3:46.48	+2.49
11	18	Great Britain	Adele Nicoll; Kya Placide	56.57	7	56.48	8	57.02	11	56.51	13	3:46.58	+2.59
12	19	France	Margot Boch; Carla Sénéchal	56.73	13	56.62	13	56.97	10	56.35	10	3:46.67	+2.68
13	5	Austria	Katrin Beierl; Anna Schenk	56.59	8	56.67	14	57.04	13	56.51	13	3:46.81	+2.82
14	6	China	Ying Qing; Wang Yu	56.80	14	56.61	12	57.18	14	56.45	12	3:47.04	+3.05
15	13	Poland	Linda Weiszewski; Marika Zandecka	56.86	15	56.75	16	57.28	15	56.75	17	3:47.64	+3.65
16	12	Slovakia	Viktória Čerňanská; Lucia Mokrášová	57.03	18	56.78	17	57.36	17	56.63	16	3:47.80	+3.81
17	16	Canada	Melissa Lotholz; Alex Klein	56.96	17	57.07	21	57.30	16	56.60	15	3:47.93	+3.94
18	14	Belgium	Kelly Van Petegem; Jïenity De Kler	57.29	20	56.71	15	57.63	19	56.85	18	3:48.48	+4.49
19	17	Switzerland	Debora Annen; Julie Leuenberger	56.93	16	56.82	18	57.45	18	57.98	19	3:49.18	+5.19
20	20	United States	Riley Tejcek; Jasmine Jones (Runs 1-2); Jestena Mattson (Runs 3-4)	57.27	19	57.04	20	57.74	20	58.45	20	3:50.50	+6.51
21	24	Australia	Sarah Blizzard; Desi Johnson	57.36	21	56.97	19	57.75	21	Did not advance			
22	21	Romania	Georgeta Popescu; Medeea Musulete	57.76	22	57.20	22	57.98	22	Did not advance			
23	23	Austria	Lea Haselwanter; Linda Braun	57.78	23	57.52	23	58.55	23	Did not advance			
24	22	Netherlands	Loren Djolo; Janna Doumpas	58.09	24	57.73	24	58.69	24	Did not advance			
