= IBSF World Championships 2024 – Monobob =

Monobob at the IBSF World Championships 2024
- Venue: Winterberg bobsleigh, luge, and skeleton track
- Location: Winterberg, Germany
- Dates: 24 February (run 1–2); 25 February (run 3–4)
- Competitors: 26 from 16 nations
- Winning time: 3:54.77

Medalists
gold medal	Laura Nolte	Germany
silver medal	Elana Meyers Taylor	United States
bronze medal	Lisa Buckwitz	Germany

The Monobob competition at the IBSF World Championships 2024 was held on 24 and 25 February 2024.

== Results ==
The first two runs were started on 24 February at 09:04. The last two runs were held on 25 February at 09:04.

Rank	Bib	Athlete	Country	Run 1	Rank	Run 2	Rank	Run 3	Rank	Run 4	Rank	Total	Behind
1st place, gold medalist(s)	2	Laura Nolte	Germany	58.59	4	58.83	6	58.73	1	58.62	2	3:54.77	
2nd place, silver medalist(s)	6	Elana Meyers Taylor	United States	58.64	5	58.69	1	59.04	5	58.58	1	3:54.95	+0.18
3rd place, bronze medalist(s)	1	Lisa Buckwitz	Germany	58.51	1	58.73	3	59.13	7	58.63	3	3:55.00	+0.23
4	4	Breeana Walker	Australia	58.57	3	58.78	4	58.90	2	58.82	7	3:55.07	+0.30
5	5	Andreea Grecu	Romania	58.78	7	58.72	2	58.94	3	55.68	4	3:55.12	+0.35
6	3	Kaysha Love	United States	58.71	6	58.78	4	59.13	7	58.74	5	3:55.36	+0.59
7	19	Sylvia Hoffman	United States	58.89	9	58.87	8	58.97	4	58.80	6	3:55.53	+0.76
8	9	Cynthia Appiah	Canada	58.56	2	59.00	13	59.09	6	58.90	8	3:55.55	+0.79
9	12	Adele Nicoll	Great Britain	58.89	9	58.96	10	59.38	9	58.91	9	3:56.14	+1.37
10	18	Margot Boch	France	58.92	11	58.89	9	59.43	10	59.02	11	3:56.26	+1.49
11	7	Melanie Hasler	Switzerland	58.88	8	58.98	12	59.65	15	58.97	10	3:56.48	+1.71
12	26	Kim Kalicki	Germany	59.06	12	58.85	7	59.59	12	59.07	12	3:56.57	+1.80
13	15	Debora Annen	Switzerland	59.08	14	59.02	15	59.55	11	59.20	13	3:56.85	+2.08
14	17	Melissa Lotholz	Canada	59.06	12	59.02	15	59.64	14	59.20	13	3:56.92	+2.15
15	8	Ying Qing	China	59.15	15	58.96	10	59.71	18	59.34	17	3:57.16	+2.39
16	11	Katrin Beierl	Austria	59.15	15	59.03	17	59.66	17	59.35	18	3:57.19	+2.42
17	10	Bianca Ribi	Canada	59.29	17	59.01	14	59.65	15	59.26	15	3:57.21	+2.44
18	16	Kelly Van Petegem	Belgium	59.33	18	59.17	18	59.77	19	59.26	15	3:57.53	+2.76
19	14	Linda Weiszewski	Poland	59.51	20	59.18	19	59.86	21	59.43	19	3:57.98	+3.21
20	25	Simidele Adeagbo	Nigeria	59.52	22	59.27	21	59.78	20	1:00.24	20	3:58.81	+4.04
21	13	Viktória Čerňanská	Slovakia	59.60	23	59.24	20	59.94	22	Did not advance			
22	20	Patrícia Tajcnárová	Czech Republic	59.51	20	59.68	24	59.61	13	Did not advance			
23	21	Sarah Blizzard	Australia	59.49	19	59.89	25	1:00.20	23	Did not advance			
24	24	Lea Haslwanter	Austria	59.68	24	59.63	22	1:00.35	24	Did not advance			
25	22	Georgeta Popescu	Romania	59.88	26	59.95	26	1:00.39	25	Did not advance			
26	23	Loren Djolo	Netherlands	59.69	25	59.66	23	1:01.60	26	Did not advance			
