= 2021–22 Bobsleigh World Cup =

International bobsleigh competition

Winners
- Two-man: (Germany) Francesco Friedrich (5)
- Four-man: (Germany) Francesco Friedrich (4)
- Combined men's: (Germany) Francesco Friedrich (5)
- Woman's Monobob: (United States) Elana Meyers Taylor (1)
- Two-woman: (United States) Elana Meyers Taylor (2)
- Combined women's: (United States) Elana Meyers Taylor (1)

Competitions
- Venues: 5 (8 events)

The 2021–22 Bobsleigh World Cup was a multi-race series over a season for bobsleigh. The season started in Innsbruck-Igls, Austria on 20 November 2021 and finished in St. Moritz, Switzerland on 16 January 2022. The season sponsor was BMW.

== Calendar ==
Below is the schedule of the 2021/22 season.

=== Bobsleigh World Cup ===
Venue	Date	Details
(Austria) Innsbruck-Igls	20–21 November 2021	
(Austria) Innsbruck-Igls	27–28 November 2021	
(Germany) Altenberg	4–5 December 2021	
(Germany) Winterberg	11–12 December 2021	No 2-man race. Double race for 4-man.
(Germany) Altenberg	18–19 December 2021	
(Latvia) Sigulda	1–2 January 2022	No 4-man race. Double race for 2-man.
(Germany) Winterberg	8–9 January 2022	
(Switzerland) St. Moritz	15–16 January 2022	also European Championships

=== Women's Monobob World Series ===
(*) - additional races

Venue	Date	Details
(Canada) Whistler *	7–9 November 2021	Triple race
(Norway) Lillehammer *	11–12 November 2021	Double race
(Austria) Innsbruck-Igls 1	20 November 2021	
(United States) Park City *	23–24 November 2021	Double race
(Germany) Altenberg 1 *	26 November 2021	
(Austria) Innsbruck-Igls 2	27 November 2021	
(Germany) Winterberg 1 *	3 December 2021	
(Germany) Altenberg 2	4 December 2021	
(Germany) Winterberg 2	11 December 2021	
(Latvia) Sigulda 1 *	11 December 2021	
(United States) Lake Placid *	13–14 December 2021	Triple race
(Germany) Altenberg 3	18 December 2021	
(Latvia) Sigulda 2	1 January 2022	
(Austria) Innsbruck-Igls 3 *	6–7 January 2022	Double race
(Germany) Winterberg 3	8 January 2022	
(Germany) Winterberg 4 *	14 January 2022	
(Switzerland) St. Moritz	15 January 2022	

== Results ==
=== Two-man ===
Event:	Gold:	Time	Silver:	Time	Bronze:	Time
(Austria) Innsbruck-Igls 1	Francesco Friedrich; Alexander Schüller; Germany	1:42.85 (51.27 / 51.58)	Johannes Lochner; Florian Bauer; Germany	1:43.32 (51.69 / 51.63)	Brad Hall; Greg Cackett; Great Britain	1:43.48 (51.69 / 51.79)
(Austria) Innsbruck-Igls 2	Francesco Friedrich; Alexander Schüller; Germany	1:43.48 (51.57 / 51.91)	Johannes Lochner; Florian Bauer; Germany	1:43.84 (51.72 / 52.12)	Justin Kripps; Cam Stones; Canada	1:43.96 (51.84 / 52.12)
(Germany) Altenberg 1	Francesco Friedrich; Alexander Schüller; Germany	1:46.96 (55.06 / 54.90)	Johannes Lochner; Christopher Weber; Germany	1:47.20 (54.90 / 55.30)	Rostislav Gaitiukevich; Mikhail Mordasov; Russia	1:47.23 (54.95 / 55.28)
(Germany) Altenberg 2	Francesco Friedrich; Thorsten Margis; Germany	1:50.37 (55.09 / 55.28)	Christoph Hafer; Issam Ammour; Germany	1:50.59 (55.24 / 55.35)	Justin Kripps; Cam Stones; Canada	1:50.68 (55.42 / 55.26)
(Latvia) Sigulda 1	Rostislav Gaitiukevich; Mikhail Mordasov; Russia	1:39.23 (49.65 / 49.58)	Brad Hall; Greg Cackett; Great Britain	1:39.33 (49.64 / 49.69)	Benjamin Maier; Markus Sammer; Austria	1:39.40 (49.70 / 49.70)
(Latvia) Sigulda 2	Francesco Friedrich; Thorsten Margis; Germany	1:39.16 (49.46 / 49.70)	Brad Hall; Nick Gleeson; Great Britain	1:39.22 (49.52 / 49.70)	Oskars Ķibermanis; Matīss Miknis; Latvia	1:39.71 (49.83 / 49.88)
(Germany) Winterberg	Francesco Friedrich; Alexander Schüller; Germany	1:49.78 (54.89 / 54.89)	Johannes Lochner; Florian Bauer; Germany	1:50.11 (54.94 / 55.17)	Justin Kripps; Cam Stones; Canada	1:50.63 (55.20 / 55.43)
(Switzerland) St. Moritz	Francesco Friedrich; Thorsten Margis; Germany	2:11.76 (1:05.89 / 1:05.87)	Justin Kripps; Cam Stones; Canada	2:11.95 (1:06.15 / 1:05.80)	Johannes Lochner; Florian Bauer; Germany	2:12.12 (1:06.14 / 1:05.98)

=== Four-man ===
Event:	Gold:	Time	Silver:	Time	Bronze:	Time
(Austria) Innsbruck-Igls 1	Francesco Friedrich; Alexander Schüller; Thorsten Margis; Candy Bauer; Germany	1:41.31 (50.54 / 50.77)	Brad Hall; Nick Gleeson; Greg Cackett; Taylor Lawrence; Great Britain	1:41.57 (50.66 / 50.91)	none awarded	
(Austria) Innsbruck-Igls 1	Francesco Friedrich; Alexander Schüller; Thorsten Margis; Candy Bauer; Germany	1:41.31 (50.54 / 50.77)	Johannes Lochner; Christopher Weber; Maximilan Bruckert Erec; Christian Rasp; Germany	1:41.57 (50.62 / 50.95)	none awarded	
(Austria) Innsbruck-Igls 2	Francesco Friedrich; Thorsten Margis; Martin Grothkopp; Alexander Schüller; Germany	1:41.82 (50.95 / 50.99)	Oskars Ķibermanis; Dāvis Spriņģis; Matīss Miknis; Intars Dambis; Latvia	1:42.10 (51.37 / 51.08)	Justin Kripps; Ryan Sommer; Ben Coakwell; Cameron Stones; Canada	1:42.15 (51.18 / 51.13)
(Germany) Altenberg 1	Francesco Friedrich; Thorsten Margis; Candy Bauer; Alexander Schüller; Germany	1:47.96 (53.99 / 53.97)	Benjamin Maier; Sascha Stepan; Markus Sammer; Kristian Huber; Austria	1:48.63 (54.35 / 54.28)	Rostislav Gaitiukevich; Mikhail Mordasov; Vladislav Zharovtsev; Pavel Travkin; Russia	1:48.76 (54.40 / 54.36)
(Germany) Winterberg 1	Francesco Friedrich; Thorsten Margis; Alexander Schüller; Martin Grothkopp; Germany	1:47.95 (53.78 / 54.17)	Johannes Lochner; Christopher Weber; Christian Rasp; Florian Bauer; Germany	1:48.00 (53.76 / 54.24)	Justin Kripps; Ryan Sommer; Cam Stones; Benjamin Coakwell; Canada	1:48.09 (53.89 / 54.20)
(Germany) Winterberg 2	Francesco Friedrich; Thorsten Margis; Alexander Schüller; Candy Bauer; Germany	1:49.38 (54.74 / 54.64)	Brad Hall; Nick Gleeson; Greg Cackett; Taylor Lawrence; Great Britain	1:49.68 (54.86 / 54.82)	Benjamin Maier; Sascha Stepan; Markus Sammer; Kristian Huber; Austria	1:49.74 (54.88 / 54.86 )
(Germany) Altenberg 2	Francesco Friedrich; Thorsten Margis; Alexander Schüller; Martin Grothkopp; Germany	1:48.88 (54.37 / 54.51)	Justin Kripps; Cam Stones; Ryan Sommer; Benjamin Coakwell; Canada	1:49.16 (54.50 / 54.66)	Rostislav Gaitiukevich; Alexey Laptev; Mikhail Mordasov; Pavel Travkin; Russia	1:49.23 (54.74 / 54.49)
(Germany) Winterberg 3	Francesco Friedrich; Alexander Schüller; Candy Bauer; Thorsten Margis; Germany	1:49.08 (54.40 / 54.68)	Brad Hall; Nick Gleeson; Taylor Lawrence; Greg Cackett; Great Britain	1:49.50 (54.67 / 54.83)	Hunter Church; Joshua Williamson; Charles Volker; Kristopher Horn; United States	1:49.54 (54.76 / 54.78)
(Switzerland) St. Moritz	Oskars Ķibermanis; Dāvis Spriņģis; Matīss Miknis; Edgars Nemme; Latvia	2:09.38 (1:04.69 / 1:04.69)	Francesco Friedrich; Martin Grothkopp; Alexander Rödiger; Alexander Schüller; Germany	2:09.54 (1:04.88 / 1:04.66)	Rostislav Gaitiukevich; Mikhail Mordasov; Pavel Travkin; Alexey Laptev; Russia	2:09.66 (1:04.84 / 1:04.82)

=== Women’s Monobob World Series ===
(*) - additional races

Event:	Gold:	Time	Silver:	Time	Bronze:	Time
(Canada) Whistler 1 *	(Canada) Alysia Rissling	1:52.79	(United States) Brittany Reinbolt	1:54.21	(Jamaica) Jazmine Fenlator-Victorian	1:55.96
(Canada) Whistler 2 *	(Canada) Alysia Rissling	1:52.60	(United States) Brittany Reinbolt	1:53.87	(Canada) Bianca Ribi	1:54.98
(Canada) Whistler 3 *	(Canada) Alysia Rissling	1:52.88	(Canada) Bianca Ribi	1:53.06	(United States) Brittany Reinbolt	1:54.79
(Norway) Lillehammer 1 *	(Germany) Stephanie Schneider	1:51.15	(Netherlands) Karlien Sleper	1:51.68	(Slovakia) Viktória Čerňanská	1:51.97
(Norway) Lillehammer 2 *	(Germany) Stephanie Schneider	1:51.16	(Netherlands) Karlien Sleper	1:51.51	(Germany) Lisa Buckwitz	1:51.61
(Austria) Innsbruck-Igls 1	(United States) Elana Meyers Taylor	1:50.50	(United States) Kaillie Humphries	1:50.63	(Germany) Laura Nolte	1:50.64
(United States) Park City 1 *	(Canada) Alysia Rissling	1:43.60	(United States) Brittany Reinbolt	1:44.26	(United States) Nicole Vogt	1:44:69
(United States) Park City 2 *	(Canada) Alysia Rissling	1:44.42	(United States) Brittany Reinbolt	1:45.95	(Canada) Bianca Ribi	1:46.05
(Germany) Altenberg 1 *	(Germany) Lisa Buckwitz	2:00.61	(Slovakia) Viktória Čerňanská	2:02.35	(Russia) Alena Osipenko	2:02.54
(Austria) Innsbruck-Igls 2	(United States) Elana Meyers Taylor	1:51.60	(Germany) Laura Nolte	1:51.65	(Australia) Breeana Walker	1:51.79
(Germany) Winterberg 1 *	(Australia) Breeana Walker	1:51.54	(Germany) Lisa Buckwitz	1:59.99	(France) Margot Boch	2:00.59
(Germany) Altenberg 2	(United States) Kaillie Humphries	2:00.57	(Canada) Cynthia Appiah	2:00.63	(Germany) Laura Nolte	2:01.10
(Germany) Winterberg 2	(United States) Elana Meyers Taylor	1:57.83	(Australia) Breeana Walker	1:58.06	(Canada) Cynthia Appiah	1:58.24
(Latvia) Sigulda 1 *	(South Korea) Kim Yoo-ran	1:49.51	(Slovakia) Viktória Čerňanská	1:49.57	(Romania) Georgeta Popescu	1:50.69
(United States) Lake Placid 1 *	(Canada) Alysia Rissling	1:55.81	(Australia) Ashleigh Werner	1:56.30	(Canada) Bianca Ribi	1:56.75
(United States) Lake Placid 2 *	(Canada) Alysia Rissling	1:55.37	(Australia) Ashleigh Werner	1:55.84	(Jamaica) Jazmine Fenlator-Victorian	1:56.31
(United States) Lake Placid 3 *	(Canada) Alysia Rissling	1:56.28	(Australia) Ashleigh Werner	1:56.92	(United States) Brittany Reinbolt	1:57.11
(Germany) Altenberg 3	(Canada) Christine de Bruin	1:59.96	(Canada) Cynthia Appiah	2:00.09	(United States) Kaillie Humphries	2:00.15
(Latvia) Sigulda 2	(Canada) Christine de Bruin	1:48.12	(Australia) Breeana Walker	1:48.68	(Russia) Nadezhda Sergeeva	1:48.70
(Austria) Innsbruck-Igls 3 *	(Germany) Stephanie Schneider	1:51.73	(Australia) Ashleigh Werner	1:51.86	(France) Margot Boch	1:52.13
(Austria) Innsbruck-Igls 4 *	(France) Margot Boch	1:52.17	(Germany) Stephanie Schneider	1:52.19	(Australia) Ashleigh Werner	1:52.73
(Germany) Winterberg 3	(United States) Elana Meyers Taylor	1:58.76	(Australia) Breeana Walker	1:58.93	(Germany) Laura Nolte	1:59.01
(Germany) Winterberg 4 *	(Nigeria) Simidele Adeagbo	2:01.00	(Romania) Georgeta Popescu	2:01.52	(Ukraine) Lidiia Hunko	2:02.23
(Switzerland) St. Moritz	(United States) Kaillie Humphries	2:22.27	(United States) Elana Meyers Taylor	2:22.31	(Canada) Cynthia Appiah	2:23.22

=== Two-woman ===
Event:	Gold:	Time	Silver:	Time	Bronze:	Time
(Austria) Innsbruck-Igls 1	Laura Nolte; Leonie Fiebig; Germany	1:46.22 (53.12 / 53.10)	Kim Kalicki; Anabel Galander; Germany	1:46.39 (53.23 / 53.16)	Christine de Bruin; Kristen Bujnowski; Canada	1:46.51 (53.18 / 53.33)
(Austria) Innsbruck-Igls 2	Laura Nolte; Deborah Levi; Germany	1:46.71 (53.45 / 53.26)	Kim Kalicki; Leonie Fiebig; Germany	1:46.77 (53.53 / 53.24)	Christine de Bruin; Kristen Bujnowski; Canada	1:46.86 (53.52 / 53.34)
(Germany) Altenberg 1	Kaillie Humphries; Kaysha Love; United States	1:54.10 (56.99 / 57.11)	Laura Nolte; Leonie Fiebig; Germany	1:54.14 (56.97 / 57.17)	Christine de Bruin; Kristen Bujnowski; Canada	1:54.45 (57.13 / 57.32)
(Germany) Winterberg 1	Laura Nolte; Deborah Levi; Germany	1:53.77 (56.74 / 57.03)	Mariama Jamanka; Alexandra Burghardt; Germany	1:53.84 (56.89 / 56.95)	Kim Kalicki; Leonie Fiebig; Germany	1:54.13 (57.11 / 57.02)
(Germany) Altenberg 2	Kim Kalicki; Lisa Buckwitz; Germany	1:54.49 (57.42 / 57.07)	Mariama Jamanka; Alexandra Burghardt; Germany	1:54.71 (57.49 / 57.22)	Kaillie Humphries; Sylvia Hoffman; United States	1:54.92 (57.64 / 57.28)
(Latvia) Sigulda	Elana Meyers Taylor; Lake Kwaza; United States	1:41.88 (50.72 / 51.16)	Mica McNeill; Adele Nicoll; Great Britain	1:42.10 (50.86 / 51.24)	Christine de Bruin; Kristen Bujnowski; Canada	1:42.12 (51.01 / 51.11)
(Germany) Winterberg 2	Laura Nolte; Deborah Levi; Germany	1:57.15 (58.95 / 58.20)	Kim Kalicki; Leonie Fiebig; Germany	1:57.28 (59.49 / 57.79)	Kaillie Humphries; Sylvia Hoffman; United States	1:57.30 (59.43 / 57.87)
(Switzerland) St. Moritz	Kim Kalicki; Lisa Buckwitz; Germany	2:15.50 (1:08.10 / 1:07.40)	Mariama Jamanka; Kira Lipperheide; Germany	2:15.54 (1:08.02 / 1:07.52)	Laura Nolte; Deborah Levi; Germany	2:15.57 (1:08.10 / 1:07.47)

== Standings ==
=== Two-man ===
Pos.	Racer	(Austria) IGL 1	(Austria) IGL 2	(Germany) ALT 1	(Germany) ALT 2	(Latvia) SIG 1	(Latvia) SIG 2	(Germany) WIN	(Switzerland) STM	Points
1	Francesco Friedrich (GER)	1	1	1	1	12	1	1	1	1703
2	Justin Kripps (CAN)	4	3	6	3	4	8	3	2	1530
3	Rostislav Gaitiukevich (RUS)	6	4	3	6	1	7	4	4	1521
4	Johannes Lochner (GER)	2	2	2	10	6	9	2	3	1512
5	Brad Hall (GBR)	3	5	11	9	2	2	6	6	1444
6	Christoph Hafer (GER)	15	6	5	2	10	10	5	8	1306
7	Michael Vogt (SUI)	7	8	9	10	13	13	9	9	1168
8	Oskars Ķibermanis (LAT)	12	13	14	18	8	3	11	5	1120
9	Simon Friedli (SUI)	9	18	8	5	5	5	8	–	1104
10	Romain Heinrich (FRA)	17	12	9	8	7	12	12	11	1088

=== Four-man ===
Pos.	Racer	(Austria) IGL 1	(Austria) IGL 2	(Germany) ALT 1	(Germany) WIN 1	(Germany) WIN 2	(Germany) ALT 2	(Germany) WIN 3	(Switzerland) STM	Points
1	Francesco Friedrich (GER)	1	1	1	1	1	1	1	2	1785
2	Justin Kripps (CAN)	6	3	5	3	4	2	5	5	1530
3	Rostislav Gaitiukevich (RUS)	7	4	3	7	5	3	7	3	1480
4	Brad Hall (GBR)	2	11	9	5	2	7	2	8	1430
5	Johannes Lochner (GER)	2	7	4	2	5	21	4	5	1402
6	Oskars Ķibermanis (LAT)	5	2	10	8	11	5	9	1	1395
7	Michael Vogt (SUI)	9	10	6	9	7	6	18	7	1216
8	Benjamin Maier (AUT)	4	5	2	6	3	4	–	–	1154
9	Maxim Andrianov (RUS)	10	8	7	17	9	14	6	12	1128
10	Hunter Church (USA)	8	5	21	10	11	13	3	13	1126

=== Women’s Monobob World Series ===
Only best five results of each pilot were added up.

(*) - additional races

Pos.	Racer	(Canada) WHI 1 *	(Canada) WHI 2 *	(Canada) WHI 3 *	(Norway) LIL 1 *	(Norway) LIL 2 *	(Austria) IGL 1	(United States) PAC 1 *	(United States) PAC 2 *	(Germany) ALT 1 *	(Austria) IGL 2	(Germany) WIN 1 *	(Germany) ALT 2	(Germany) WIN 2	(Latvia) SIG 1 *	(United States) LP 1 *	(United States) LP 2 *	(United States) LP 3 *	(Germany) ALT 3	(Latvia) SIG 2	(Austria) IGL 3 *	(Austria) IGL 4 *	(Germany) WIN 3	(Germany) WIN 4 *	(Switzerland) STM	Points
1	Elana Meyers Taylor (USA)	—	—	—	—	—	1	—	—	—	1	—	~~6~~	1	—	—	—	—	~~12~~	—	—	—	1	—	2	1110
2	Kaillie Humphries (USA)	—	—	—	—	—	2	—	—	—	~~6~~	—	1	~~13~~	—	—	—	—	3	—	—	—	4	—	1	1052
3	Cynthia Appiah (CAN)	—	—	—	—	—	4	—	—	—	~~5~~	—	2	3	—	—	—	—	2	—	—	—	~~5~~	—	3	1012
4	Christine de Bruin (CAN)	—	—	—	—	—	~~7~~	—	—	—	4	—	4	~~9~~	—	—	—	—	1	1	—	—	~~8~~	—	6	1010
5	Breeana Walker (AUS)	—	—	—	—	—	6	—	—	—	3	~~1~~	—	2	—	—	—	—	—	2	—	—	2	—	~~7~~	1006
6	Laura Nolte (GER)	—	—	—	—	—	3	—	—	—	2	—	3	4	—	—	—	—	~~4~~	—	—	—	3	—	~~5~~	1002
7	Nadezhda Sergeeva (RUS)	—	—	—	—	—	~~9~~	—	—	—	7	—	5	5	—	—	—	—	~~10~~	3	—	—	7	—	~~8~~	904
8	Melissa Lotholz (CAN)	—	—	—	—	—	5	—	—	—	11	—	~~18~~	6	—	—	—	—	9	—	—	—	6	—	~~11~~	824
9	Mariama Jamanka (GER)	—	—	—	—	—	11	—	—	—	~~16~~	—	~~13~~	7	—	—	—	—	7	—	—	—	9	—	4	816
10	Melanie Hasler (SUI)	—	—	—	—	—	8	—	—	—	8	—	8	~~14~~	—	—	—	—	11	—	—	—	~~13~~	—	9	768

=== Two-woman ===
Pos.	Racer	(Austria) IGL 1	(Austria) IGL 2	(Germany) ALT 1	(Germany) WIN 1	(Germany) ALT 2	(Latvia) SIG	(Germany) WIN 2	(Switzerland) STM	Points
1	Elana Meyers Taylor (USA)	7	5	5	6	4	1	4	5	1505
2	Laura Nolte (GER)	1	1	2	1	6	–	1	3	1486
3	Kim Kalicki (GER)	2	2	4	3	1	–	2	1	1472
4	Christine de Bruin (CAN)	3	3	3	4	16	3	5	6	1448
5	Kaillie Humphries (USA)	4	10	1	5	3	–	3	4	1337
6	Mariama Jamanka (GER)	4	4	10	2	2	–	9	2	1310
7	Nadezhda Sergeeva (RUS)	8	9	6	10	8	15	10	8	1200
8	Ying Qing (CHN)	13	16	8	17	9	6	17	15	984
9	Anastasiya Makarova (RUS)	18	18	12	14	5	5	16	14	976
10	Andreea Grecu (ROU)	17	14	7	14	11	7	20	13	972

== Medal table ==
Rank	Nation	Gold	Silver	Bronze	Total
1	Germany	24	18	7	49
2	Canada	10	5	14	29
3	United States	8	6	7	21
4	Australia	1	7	2	10
5	Latvia	1	1	1	3
6	Russia	1	0	6	7
7	France	1	0	2	3
8	Nigeria	1	0	0	1
8	South Korea	1	0	0	1
10	Great Britain	0	6	1	7
11	Slovakia	0	2	1	3
12	Netherlands	0	2	0	2
13	Austria	0	1	2	3
14	Romania	0	1	1	2
15	Jamaica	0	0	2	2
16	Ukraine	0	0	1	1
Totals (16 entries)		48	49	47	144

== Points ==
Place	1	2	3	4	5	6	7	8	9	10	11	12	13	14	15	16	17	18	19	20
Women's Monobob World Series (additional races)	120	110	102	96	92	88	84	80	76	72	68
2-Man, 4-Man; Women's Monobob World Series (main races), 2-Woman	225	210	200	192	184	176	168	160	152	144	136	128	120	112	104	96	88	80	74	68
