= Bobsleigh at the 2026 Winter Olympics – Two-woman =

Bobsleigh two-woman at the XXV Olympic Winter Games
- Bobsleigh
- Venue: Cortina Sliding Centre; Cortina d'Ampezzo
- Date: 20, 21 February 2026
- Competitors: 50 from 14 nations
- Teams: 25
- Winning time: 3:48.46

Medalists
1st place, gold medalist(s)		Laura Nolte; Deborah Levi	Germany
2nd place, silver medalist(s)		Lisa Buckwitz; Neele Schuten	Germany
3rd place, bronze medalist(s)		Kaillie Humphries; Jasmine Jones	United States

The two-woman competition in bobsleigh at the 2026 Winter Olympics will be held on 20 February (heats 1 and 2) and 21 February (heats 3 and 4), at the Cortina Sliding Centre in Cortina d'Ampezzo. Laura Nolte and Deborah Levi of Germany successfully defended their 2022 title. Their teammates Lisa Buckwitz and Neele Schuten won the silver medal, and Kaillie Humphries and Jasmine Jones of the United States won bronze. For Schuten and Jones these were the first Olympic medals.

== Background ==
The defending champions, Laura Nolte and Deborah Levi, qualified for the event. The 2022 silver medalists were Mariama Jamanka and Alexandra Burghardt; Jamanka retired from competitions. The bronze medalists were Elana Meyers Taylor and Sylvia Hoffman; Meyers Taylor qualified but in 2026 she was competing together with Jadin O'Brien. Nolte won the 2025–26 Bobsleigh World Cup, having won five out of seven two-woman races that season; the remaining two races were won by Kaillie Humphries. Nolte and Levi were the 2025 World champions.

== Qualification ==
=== Summary ===
Sleds qualified	Countries	Athletes total	Nation
3	3	18	Canada; Germany; United States
2	5	20	Australia; Austria; China; Italy; Switzerland
1	6	12	France; Great Britain; South Korea; Poland; Slovakia; Chinese Taipei
25	14	50	

== Results ==
Rank	Bib	Athletes	Country	Run 1	Rank	Run 2	Rank	Run 3	Rank	Run 4	Rank	Total	Behind
1st place, gold medalist(s)	1	Laura Nolte; Deborah Levi	Germany	56.97	2	56.96	1	57.26	1	57.27	1	3:48.46	—
2nd place, silver medalist(s)	4	Lisa Buckwitz; Neele Schuten	Germany	57.05	3	57.06	2	57.43	2	57.45	2	3:48.99	+0.53
3rd place, bronze medalist(s)	2	Kaillie Humphries; Jasmine Jones	United States	56.92 TR	1	57.24	4	57.57	4	57.48	3	3:49.21	+0.75
4	3	Kim Kalicki; Talea Prepens	Germany	57.13	4	57.23	3	57.46	3	57.54	4	3:49.36	+0.90
5	8	Kaysha Love; Azaria Hill	United States	57.18	6	57.37	5	57.57	4	57.59	5	3:49.71	+1.25
6	7	Melanie Hasler; Nadja Pasternack	Switzerland	57.22	7	57.61	9	57.95	8	57.62	6	3:50.40	+1.94
7	6	Elana Meyers Taylor; Jadin O'Brien	United States	57.14	5	57.99	21	57.60	6	57.76	9	3:50.49	+2.03
7	9	Debora Annen; Salomé Kora	Switzerland	57.42	10	57.61	9	57.83	7	57.63	7	3:50.49	+2.03
9	5	Katrin Beierl; Christania Williams	Austria	57.32	9	57.63	11	57.96	9	57.68	8	3:50.59	+2.13
10	24	Breeana Walker; Kiara Reddingius	Australia	57.45	11	57.60	7	57.96	9	57.81	12	3:50.82	+2.36
11	12	Bianca Ribi; Skylar Sieben	Canada	57.57	12	57.55	6	58.16	13	58.16	17	3:51.44	+2.98
11	13	Huai Mingming; Wang Xuan	China	57.60	13	57.60	7	58.22	14	58.02	13	3:51.44	+2.98
13	14	Melissa Lotholz; Kelsey Mitchell	Canada	57.29	8	57.64	12	58.82	24	57.78	10	3:51.53	+3.07
14	11	Cynthia Appiah; Dawn Richardson Wilson	Canada	57.68	14	57.66	13	58.41	17	58.04	14	3:51.79	+3.33
15	17	Adele Nicoll; Ashleigh Nelson	Great Britain	58.03	20	57.97	20	58.03	11	57.80	11	3:51.83	+3.37
16	15	Kim Yoo-ran; Jeon Eun-ji	South Korea	57.88	17	57.91	16	58.15	12	58.10	16	3:52.04	+3.58
17	10	Margot Boch; Carla Sénéchal	France	57.98	19	57.85	14	58.54	20	58.05	15	3:52.42	+3.96
18	18	Linda Weiszewski; Klaudia Adamek	Poland	57.74	15	58.36	24	58.24	15	58.29	18	3:52.63	+4.17
19	16	Viktória Čerňanská; Lucia Mokrášová	Slovakia	57.94	18	57.86	15	58.58	21	58.31	19	3:52.69	+4.23
20	19	Giada Andreutti; Alessia Gatti	Italy	57.76	16	58.16	22	58.28	16	58.97	20	3:53.17	+4.71
21	22	Sarah Blizzard; Desi Johnson	Australia	58.07	22	57.91	16	58.42	18	Did not advance		2:54.40	—
22	23	Ying Qing; Wang Yu	China	58.03	20	57.96	19	58.50	19	Did not advance		2:54.49	—
23	21	Simona de Silvestro; Anna Costella	Italy	58.33	24	57.93	18	58.62	23	Did not advance		2:54.88	—
24	25	Lea Haslwanter; Victoria Festin	Austria	58.10	23	58.20	23	58.61	22	Did not advance		2:54.91	—
25	20	Lin Sin-rong; Lin Song-en	Chinese Taipei	58.65	25	59.09	25	59.03	25	Did not advance		2:56.77	—
