= IBSF World Championships 2025 – Two-woman =

Two-woman at the IBSF World Championships 2025
- Venue: Mt. Van Hoevenberg Olympic Bobsled Run
- Location: Lake Placid, United States
- Dates: 14–15 March
- Competitors: 40 from 12 nations
- Teams: 20
- Winning time: 3:46.00

Medalists
gold medal	Laura Nolte; Deborah Levi	Germany
silver medal	Kim Kalicki; Leonie Fiebig	Germany
bronze medal	Lisa Buckwitz; Kira Lipperheide	Germany

The Two-woman competition at the IBSF World Championships 2025 was held on 14 and 15 March 2025.

== Results ==
The first two runs were started on 14 March at 18:00. The last two runs were started on 15 March at 13:00.

Rank	Bib	Country	Athletes	Run 1	Rank	Run 2	Rank	Run 3	Rank	Run 4	Rank	Total	Behind
1st place, gold medalist(s)	1	Germany	Laura Nolte; Deborah Levi	56.43	1	56.34	1	56.16	1	57.07	1	3:46.00	
2nd place, silver medalist(s)	2	Germany	Kim Kalicki; Leonie Fiebig	56.46	2	56.54	2	56.33	2	57.19	2	3:46.52	+0.52
3rd place, bronze medalist(s)	3	Germany	Lisa Buckwitz; Kira Lipperheide	56.63	3	56.57	3	56.39	3	57.87	8	3:47.46	+1.46
4	7	United States	Kaillie Armbruster Humphries; Emily Renna	56.88	6	56.77	5	56.53	4	57.34	3	3:47.52	+1.52
5	9	United States	Kaysha Love; Jasmine Jones	56.82	5	56.71	4	56.74	6	57.49	4	3:47.76	+1.76
6	6	United States	Elana Meyers Taylor; Lolo Jones	56.76	4	56.91	6	56.65	5	57.54	5	3:47.86	+1.86
7	4	Switzerland	Melanie Hasler; Muswama Kambundji	56.96	8	57.04	7	57.03	8	57.90	9	3:48.93	+2.93
8	8	Canada	Melissa Lotholz; Leah Walkeden	57.11	9	57.14	8	57.27	11	57.64	6	3:49.16	+3.16
9	5	Austria	Katrin Beierl; Christania Williams	56.88	6	57.21	10	56.95	7	58.24	12	3:49.28	+3.28
10	10	Romania	Andreea Grecu; Teodora Vlad	57.26	10	57.14	8	57.09	9	58.26	13	3:49.75	+3.75
11	12	Canada	Cynthia Appiah; Skylar Sieben	57.31	12	57.47	12	57.20	10	57.83	7	3:49.81	+3.81
12	11	France	Margot Boch; Carla Sénéchal	57.37	13	57.61	15	57.39	13	57.91	10	3:50.28	+4.28
13	15	Australia	Breeana Walker; Kiara Reddingius	57.49	14	57.57	14	57.56	14	58.13	11	3:50.75	+4.75
14	14	Switzerland	Debora Annen; Mara Morell	57.30	11	57.53	13	57.36	12	58.59	16	3:50.78	+4.78
15	17	Canada	Bianca Ribi; Niamh Haughey	57.49	14	57.37	11	57.74	16	58.45	15	3:51.05	+5.05
16	18	South Korea	Kim Yoo-ran; Jeon Eun-ji	57.62	16	57.70	16	57.62	15	58.44	14	3:51.38	+5.38
17	13	Great Britain	Adele Nicoll; Ashleigh Nelson	57.99	17	57.97	17	57.85	17	58.66	17	3:52.47	+6.47
18	19	Chinese Taipei	Lin Sin-rong; Liang Yu-chieh	58.45	18	58.30	18	58.33	18	59.06	18	3:54.14	+8.14
19	20	Thailand	Agnese Campeol; Phaethong Wannakhot	59.95	19	59.83	19	59.98	19	1:00.52	19	4:00.28	+14.28
	16	Romania	Georgeta Popescu; Antonia Sârbu	Disqualified									
