= Rissling =

Rissling, or Rißling, is a German surname. Notable people with the surname include:

- Alysia Rissling (born 1988), Canadian bobsledder
- Gary Rissling (born 1956), Canadian ice hockey player
