= Kambundji =

Kambundji is a surname. Notable people with the name include:

- Ditaji Kambundji (born 2002), Swiss sprinter, younger sister of Mujinga
- Mujinga Kambundji (born 1992), Swiss sprinter, older sister of Ditaji
- Muswama Kambundji (born 1996), Swiss bobsledder and former sprinter, sister of Mujinga and Ditaji
