= Leonie Fiebig =

German bobsledder (born 1990)

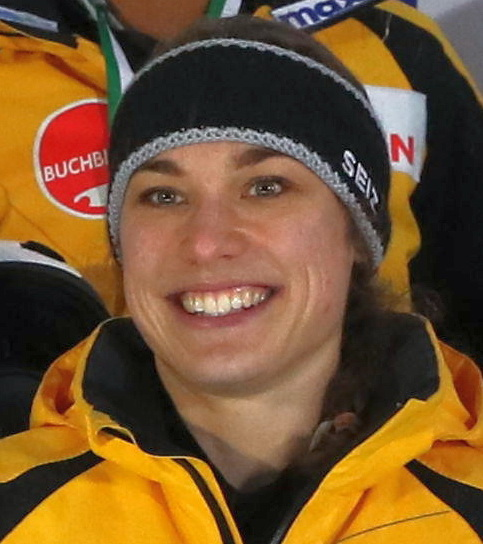
- Fiebig in 2019

Personal information
- Born: 24 May 1990 (age 36) Minden, Germany
- Height: 1.80 m (5 ft 11 in)
- Weight: 77 kg (170 lb)

Sport
- Country: Germany
- Sport: Bobsleigh
- Event: Two-woman
- Coached by: René Spies
Medal record
Women's bobsleigh
Representing Germany
World Championships
Gold medal – first place	2023 St. Moritz	Two-woman
Silver medal – second place	2025 Lake Placid	Two-woman
Bronze medal – third place	2024 Winterberg	Two-woman
European Championships
Silver medal – second place	2025 Lillehammer	Two-woman
Bronze medal – third place	2021 Winterberg	Two-woman

Leonie Fiebig (born 24 May 1990) is a German bobsledder.

== Early life ==
Growing up Fiebig was a gymnast, and at 17 years old she switched to athletics, where she competed in the sprint events as well as the long jump and high jump.

== Career ==
Fiebig competed at the IBSF European Championships 2021 where she won a bronze medal in the two-woman event along with Mariama Jamanka.

Fiebig represented Germany at the IBSF World Championships in 2023 and won a gold medal in the two-woman event along with Kim Kalicki. She again competed at the IBSF World Championships in 2024 and won a bronze medal in the two-woman event along with Kalicki, finishing 0.28 seconds behind gold medal winners Lisa Buckwitz and Vanessa Mark.

In February 2025, she competed at the IBSF European Championships 2025 and won a silver medal in the two-woman event along with Kalicki. The next month, she competed at the IBSF World Championships 2025 and won a silver medal in the two-woman event along with Kalicki.

== World Championships results ==
Event	Two-woman	Monobob
(Canada) 2019 Whistler	7th	—N/a
(Germany) 2020 Altenberg	5th	—N/a
(Germany) 2021 Altenberg	4th	
(Switzerland) 2023 St. Moritz	1st	
(Germany) 2024 Winterberg	3rd	
(United States) 2025 Lake Placid	2nd	
