= 2013 World Youth Championships in Athletics – Girls' shot put =

Girls' shot put at the 2013 World Youth Championships in Athletics
- Venue: RSC Olimpiyskiy
- Dates: 11 July (qualification & final)
- Competitors: 56
- Winning distance: 20.14 CR

Medalists
gold medal	Emel Dereli	Turkey
silver medal	Alyona Bugakova	Russia
bronze medal	Ashlie Blake	United States

The girls' shot put at the 2013 World Youth Championships in Athletics was held on 11 July.

== Medalists ==
Gold	Silver	Bronze
Emel Dereli; Turkey	Alyona Bugakova; Russia	Ashlie Blake; United States

== Records ==
Prior to the competition, the following records were as follows.

World Youth Best	Corrie de Bruin (NED)	20.52	Assen, Netherlands	13 June 1993
Championship Record	–	–	–	–
World Youth Leading	Emel Dereli (TUR)	19.99	Eskişehir, Turkey	8 June 2013

== Qualification ==
Qualification rule: 16.00 (Q) or at least 12 best performers (q) qualified.

Rank	Group	Name	Nationality	#1	#2	#3	Result	Notes
1	A	Emel Dereli	Turkey	19.18			19.18	Q, CR
2	B	Alyona Bugakova	Russia	17.32			17.32	Q
3	B	Ashlie Blake	United States	16.85			16.85	Q
4	B	Klaudia Kardasz	Poland	15.43	16.72		16.72	Q
5	A	Anika Nehls	Germany	15.53	16.60		16.60	Q
6	B	Alina Kenzel	Germany	16.33			16.33	Q
7	A	Yelena Bezruchenko	Russia	16.08			16.08	Q
8	A	Lena Giger	United States	15.84	15.02	14.71	15.84	q
9	B	Adelé Nicoll	Great Britain	15.42	15.01	15.80	15.80	q
10	A	Noora Salem Jasim	Bahrain	12.86	13.48	15.78	15.78	q, PB
11	A	Katarzyna Hnatiuk	Poland	14.66	14.27	15.75	15.75	q
12	A	Rochelle Frazer	Jamaica	13.93	15.72	13.92	15.72	q
13	A	Wanzél Breytenbach	South Africa	15.71	x	14.28	15.71	PB
14	A	Yohana Vargas	Venezuela	14.92	15.52	15.40	15.52	
15	B	Lu Hui	China	15.06	15.37	15.47	15.47	
16	A	Qi Yannan	China	14.87	15.40	15.39	15.40	
17	B	Lenuţa Burueană	Romania	x	15.27	15.36	15.36	
18	A	Djeneba Touré	Austria	14.95	15.04	15.22	15.22	
19	A	Kateryna Kosenko	Ukraine	15.11	12.19	x	15.11	
20	B	Judith Aniefuna	Nigeria	15.09	15.03	14.90	15.09	PB
21	A	Sara Lennman	Sweden	14.34	x	15.02	15.02	
22	B	Manca Avbelj	Slovenia	14.96	14.79	x	14.96	
23	B	Yasenaca Denicaucau	Australia	14.83	14.84	14.93	14.93	
24	A	Portious Warren	Trinidad and Tobago	14.90	x	13.56	14.90	PB
25	B	Anastasiya Chapayeva	Ukraine	14.32	x	14.88	14.88	
26	B	Chelsea James	Trinidad and Tobago	14.86	13.58	13.19	14.86	PB
27	B	Bettina Weber	Austria	x	x	14.82	14.82	
28	B	Monique Wagner	South Africa	x	x	14.79	14.79	
29	B	Marfo Obeng	Canada	13.49	13.50	14.67	14.67	
30	A	Jeon Yu-sun	South Korea	14.49	x	x	14.49	
31	B	Meghana Devanga	India	14.40	13.38	14.05	14.40	PB
32	B	Marta Baruffini	Italy	14.21	12.53	13.77	14.21	PB
33	B	Sylvia Luviano	Mexico	14.11	14.20	13.91	14.20	
34	A	Ginger Quintero	Ecuador	13.52	14.17	13.42	14.17	
35	B	Evelina Klimenko	Kazakhstan	13.65	13.72	14.07	14.07	
36	A	Amira Sayed	Egypt	13.38	14.02	13.73	14.02	
37	A	Paletina Lemi	Australia	13.38	13.93	x	13.93	
38	B	Isheka Binns	Jamaica	12.33	x	13.93	13.93	
39	A	Taylor Stutely	Canada	13.89	13.18	12.91	13.89	
40	A	Monica Vainola	Estonia	13.29	13.78	x	13.78	
41	A	Claudia Bertoletti	Italy	x	12.68	13.71	13.71	
42	B	Paula Ferrándiz	Spain	x	x	13.71	13.71	
43	B	Fiona Tuite	Ireland	13.49	13.59	13.03	13.59	
44	B	Anna Chipryanova	Bulgaria	13.46	x	13.51	13.51	
45	A	Veronika Domjan	Slovenia	13.25	13.50	12.81	13.50	
46	A	Vera Kovalkova	Uzbekistan	13.07	12.92	13.41	13.41	
47	A	Brashae Wood	Bahamas	13.22	13.27	13.09	13.27	
48	B	Lee So-yi	South Korea	13.17	x	x	13.17	
49	B	Anastasiya Masternak	Uzbekistan	13.04	12.80	13.12	13.12	
50	B	Trevia Gumbs	British Virgin Islands	x	x	13.07	13.07	SB
51	A	Dana Voicu	Romania	x	12.59	12.99	12.99	
52	A	Ásgerður Jana Ágústsdóttir	Iceland	12.27	12.99	12.32	12.99	
53	A	Ana Guerrero	Mexico	12.08	12.67	12.44	12.67	
54	A	Sabina Potapova	Kazakhstan	x	12.36	12.64	12.64	
55	B	Ivana Mužarić	Croatia	12.50	x	x	12.50	
	B	Agnes Larsson	Sweden	x	x	x	NM	

== Final ==
Rank	Name	Nationality	#1	#2	#3	#4	#5	#6	Result	Notes
1st place, gold medalist(s)	Emel Dereli	Turkey	20.14	x	18.96	x	x	–	20.14	CR
2nd place, silver medalist(s)	Alyona Bugakova	Russia	18.24	18.60	x	18.28	16.93	18.28	18.60	
3rd place, bronze medalist(s)	Ashlie Blake	United States	x	16.61	16.98	17.57	17.48	16.70	17.57	
4	Anika Nehls	Germany	16.68	17.23	x	x	17.14	16.78	17.23	
5	Klaudia Kardasz	Poland	15.99	16.89	16.81	x	16.98	x	16.98	
6	Yelena Bezruchenko	Russia	16.98	x	16.80	16.70	16.71	16.86	16.98	
7	Alina Kenzel	Germany	16.12	16.16	16.74	16.34	16.42	16.65	16.74	
8	Lena Giger	United States	16.49	15.32	16.52	16.40	16.29	15.67	16.52	
9	Noora Salem Jasim	Bahrain	15.92	15.08	16.48				16.48	PB
10	Katarzyna Hnatiuk	Poland	15.10	16.44	15.33				16.44	
11	Adelé Nicoll	Great Britain	15.56	15.72	15.93				15.93	
12	Rochelle Frazer	Jamaica	13.65	14.46	13.52				14.46	
