= Neele Schuten =

German bobsledder (born 1999)

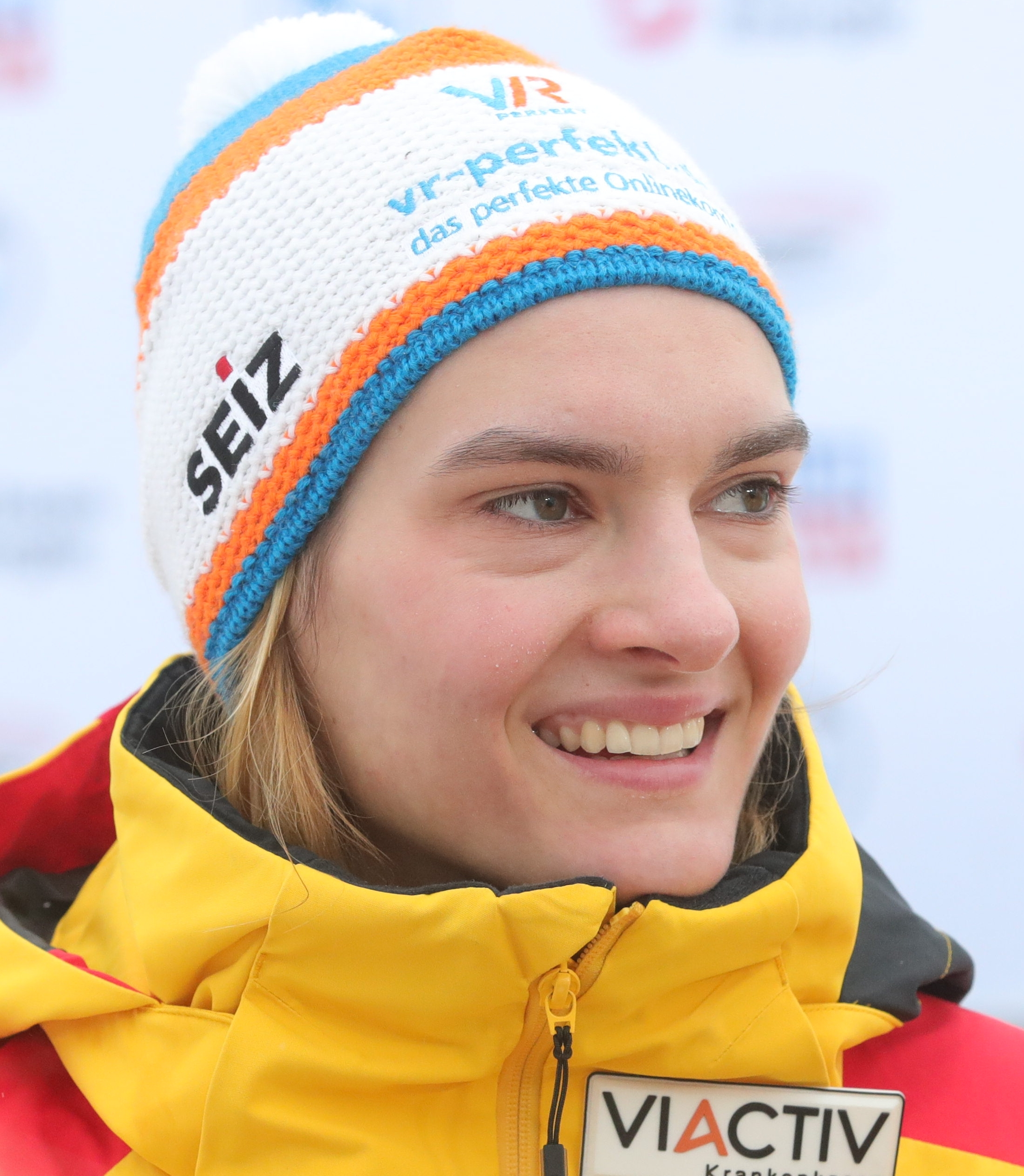
- Schuten in 2023

Personal information
- Born: 29 December 1999 (age 26) Gladbeck, Germany
- Height: 1.80 m (5 ft 11 in)
- Weight: 69 kg (152 lb)

Sport
- Country: Germany
- Sport: Bobsleigh
- Event: Two-woman
- Coached by: Heiner Preute
Medal record
Women's bobsleigh
Representing Germany
Olympic Games
Silver medal – second place	2026 Milano Cortina	Two-woman
European Championships
Gold medal – first place	2023 Altenberg	Two-woman
Gold medal – first place	2024 Sigulda	Two-woman

Neele Schuten (born 29 December 1999) is a German bobsledder. She represented Germany at the 2026 Winter Olympics.

== Career ==
In January 2023, Schuten competed at the IBSF European Championships 2023 and won a gold medal in the two-woman event along with Laura Nolte, with a time of 1:54.81. The next month, she competed at the IBSF World Championships 2023 and was in the bronze medal position after her first two runs in the two-woman event. However, they crashed in the third round after the horseshoe curve and failed to finish. She again competed at the IBSF European Championships 2024 and won a gold medal in the two-woman event along with Nolte, with a time of 1:41.53.

She represented Germany at the 2026 Winter Olympics and won a silver medal in the two-woman event along with Lisa Buckwitz.
