= Welshpool High School =

Coordinates: 52.6653°N 3.1369°W

Location
- Gallowstree Bank; Welshpool, Powys, SY21 7RE; Wales

Information
- Type: Public (magnet) secondary
- Motto: Raising Achievement by Raising Expectations
- Status: Open
- Local authority: Powys
- Specialist: Humanities College
- Department for Education URN: 401726 Tables
- Head teacher: Jon Arnold
- Gender: Mixed
- Age: 11 to 19
- Enrollment: 845 (2021)
- Student to teacher ratio: 17.3
- Hours in school day: 6.35 Hours (inc. Break & Lunch)
- Colours: Green & Black
- Free School Meals: Claimed by 12.5% of pupils
- Website: www.welshpool-hs.powys.sch.uk

Welshpool High School is located in Welshpool, Powys. It is a combined secondary school and sixth form, catering for pupils aged 11 to 19. In 2022, a new headteacher was appointed.

== Motto and the school ==
The school's motto is Raising Achievement By Raising Expectations. It was described as "A very good school with many outstanding features" in a 2004 Estyn report. The school was rated "Good" in a 2017 Estyn report. The same inspection report noted that school attendance was 'in the upper 50% of similar schools and that number of five GCSE grades at A*-A has been above average for similar schools in two of the last three years.

== AstroTurf ==
Welshpool High School has an AstroTurf pitch used throughout the year for sporting events. It is flood-lit, and cost about £450,000 to build. It is used by both the school and public.

== 5x60 ==
The school had a 5x60 scheme, where the children were offered extracurricular activities. There were lunchtime activities such as basketball, dodgeball, and other activities.

This program ended in 2018 upon the 5x60 officer leaving.

== Sixth form ==
The secondary school has a sixth form. A 'leadership team' of a head boy, head girl and 4 deputies are elected from the year 13 each year, with roles such as improving teacher-pupil relations, organizing charity events and the annual 6th form Dinner Dance.

== Campuses ==
The school itself is made of six 'blocks' (campuses). Each 'block' is for a different subject. The A Block is for maths; the B Block is for science and P.E; the C Block is for Modern Foreign Languages; The D Block is for English, art, drama, D.T & music; the E Block is for learning support and; the F Block is for humanities.

== Notable alumni ==
- Lu Corfield, actress (Last Tango in Halifax, In My Skin) was Head Girl at the school.
- Adele Nicoll (born 1996), shot-putter, discus-thrower, Olympian bobsledder.
