= Desi Johnson =

Australian bobsledder (born 2001)

Personal information
- Nationality: Australian
- Born: 6 April 2001 (age 25) Miles, Queensland
- Height: 1.80 m (5 ft 11 in)

Sport
- Country: Australia
- Sport: Bobsleigh
- Event: Two-woman

Desi Johnson (born 6 April 2001) is an Australian bobsledder. She competed in the two-woman event as a brakewoman at the 2026 Winter Olympics. She is also a social media influencer with more than 1 million followers across multiple platforms.

== Early life ==
Johnson was born in Miles, Queensland and was raised on the Gold Coast from two years of age. She attended Helensvale State High School throughout her teenage years and graduated in 2018 alongside future professional athletes such as AFLW players Dee Heslop and Serene Watson. Johnson's interest in sports began at 9 years old when her mother enrolled her in the Little Athletics program in Ashmore and she became an accomplished junior sprinter who made her first national team at 12 years of age with dreams of representing Australia at the Summer Olympics in the future. She would regularly train with high level athletes like Olympic gold medallist hurdler Sally Pearson at the Queensland Sport and Athletics Centre in her younger years and Pearson once commented that Johnson would transition well into bobsledding if she ever became interested. Along with athletics, she also played Australian rules football and netball throughout her schooling years, the latter of which she made the national team at 12 years old, but was told by her athletics coaches that she needed to stop playing other sports to avoid injuries. Johnson is based on the Gold Coast and trains at the nearby Queensland Academy of Sport training facilities in Brisbane with prominent bobsledders such as Bree Walker.

== Bobsleigh career ==
After injuries plagued her athletics career, Johnson was invited to switch sports in 2023 and decided to pursue a career in bobsleigh with the goal of representing Australia at the Winter Olympics. She qualified for her first major tournament at the 2025–26 Bobsleigh World Cup at the alpine village of Cortina d'Ampezzo in Veneto, Italy and placed 23rd in the event. In January 2026, Johnson realised her childhood dream when she was named in the Australian Olympic team due to compete at the 2026 Winter Olympics.
