= Azaria Hill =

American bobsledder (born 1998)

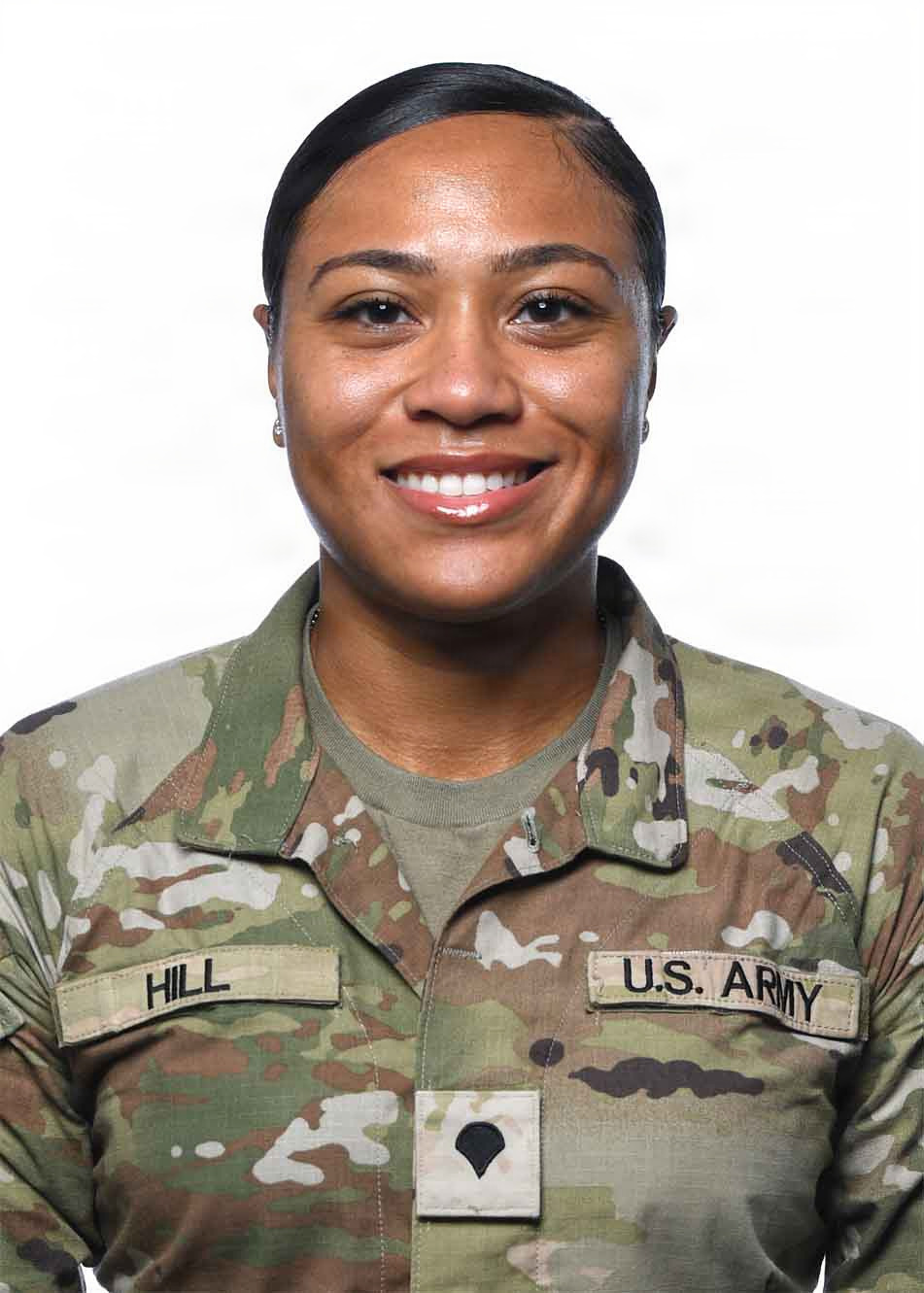
- Hill c. 2026

Personal information
- Nationality: American
- Born: June 14, 1998 (age 28) Santa Clarita, California, U.S.

Sport
- Country: United States
- Sport: Bobsleigh
- Event: Two-women

Azaria Hill (born June 14, 1998) is an American bobsledder. She placed fourth in the two-woman bobsleigh at the 2024 IBSF World Championships. She was selected to represent the United States at the 2026 Winter Olympics.

== Career ==
Hill attended Golden Valley High School in Santa Clarita, California, where she competed as a sprinter and earned a track scholarship to Long Beach State University. After her senior year track season was cancelled by the COVID-19 pandemic, Hill transferred to University of Nevada, Las Vegas, where she was part of the sprint relay team alongside her future bobsleigh partner Kaysha Love.

With Kaysha Love, Hill had a podium finish in the two-woman bobsleigh at the 2023–24 Bobsleigh World Cup event in Lillehammer, Norway. Alongside Love, Hill placed fourth at the 2024 IBSF World Championships in the two-woman in Winterburg, Germany, in Love's debut world championships as pilot. With Love, Hill also secured a win at the North America Cup in March 2024.

In November 2025, Hill and Love finished as runners-up in the two-woman bobsled test event on the new track ahead of the Milan Cortina Winter Olympics. Hill also competed in the 2025–26 Bobsleigh World Cup in the two-woman bob alongside Elana Meyers Taylor, and Kaillie Humphries.

In January 2026, Hill was selected for the two-woman bobsleigh for the 2026 Winter Olympics in Italy.

== Personal life ==
Her father, Virgil Hill, is a former Olympic boxer, and her mother is sprinter Denean Howard. The pair met while competing for the United States at the 1984 Summer Olympics. Her aunt is Olympic sprinter Sherri Howard. She has a brother who competes in minor-league baseball. Hill joined the United States Army in 2024.
