= Deborah Levi =

German bobsledder (born 1997)

Personal information
- Born: 28 August 1997 (age 29) Dillenburg, Germany
- Height: 1.73 m (5 ft 8 in)
- Weight: 71 kg (157 lb)

Sport
- Country: Germany
- Sport: Bobsleigh
- Event: Two-woman
- Club: SC Potsdam
Medal record
Women's bobsleigh
Representing Germany
Olympic Games
Gold medal – first place	2022 Beijing	Two-woman
Gold medal – first place	2026 Milano Cortina	Two-woman
World Championships
Gold medal – first place	2025 Lake Placid	Two-woman
Silver medal – second place	2024 Winterberg	Two-woman
Bronze medal – third place	2021 Alternberg	Two-woman
European Championships
Gold medal – first place	2021 Winterberg	Two-woman
Bronze medal – third place	2022 St. Moritz	Two-woman
Junior World Championships
Gold medal – first place	2021 St. Moritz	Two-woman

Deborah Levi (born 28 August 1997) is a German bobsledder.

== Early life ==
In high school, Levi was a track and field athlete at TV Dillenberg in central Hessen, Germany. She studied elementary school teaching at Johann Wolfgang Goethe University.

== Career ==
She won a bronze medal at the IBSF World Championships 2021 and two gold medals in the 2022 Winter Olympics and 2026 Winter Olympics in the two-woman event. She is on a team with Laura Nolte.

She represented Germany at the 2026 Winter Olympics and won a gold medal in the two-woman event along with Nolte.

== World Championships results ==
Event	Two-woman	Monobob
(Germany) 2021 Altenberg	3rd	
(Germany) 2024 Winterberg	2nd	
(United States) 2025 Lake Placid	1st	
