= Bobsleigh and Skeleton Australia =

Governing body for bobsleigh and skeleton in Australia

- Sport: Bobsleigh and Skeleton
- Founded: 2013
- Affiliation: International Bobsleigh and Skeleton Federation
- Headquarters: Sydney, Australia
- President: Heath Spence
- Chairman: Pat Castelli
- Board members: Dean Timmings, Hayden Smith
- CEO: Heath Spence

Official website
- www.bobsleighskeleton.org.au
- (Australia)

Bobsleigh Skeleton Australia is the governing body for the sports of bobsleigh and skeleton in Australia.

== History ==
Australians have been active in ice sliding sports since the early days. Australian student George Pringle Robertson came equal first in the first international toboggan race held in Davos, Switzerland in 1883. During the 1930s Australian Frederick McEvoy competed with the Great Britain team in bobsleigh to win several Olympic and World Championship medals.

This early success wavered after World War Two. When Australians started traveling to Europe in the early 1970s some thrill-seekers were exposed to the sports of bobsleigh and skeleton. Leading the way for the new wave of Australians becoming interested in the sport was Philip Morgan Giles. Morgan Giles piloted the first Australian team to compete at an FIBT world championship in 2-man bobsleigh with Ian Peacock in 1974.

The Australian Bobsleigh Federation was established in 1985. This allowed Australia to become a recognised member of the Federation de Internationale Bobsleigh et de Tobogganing (FIBT). This paved the way forward for Australian teams to compete in FIBT races and compete at the Olympic Games.

Australia has sent 8 Skeleton athletes and 29 Bobsleigh athletes to 8 Winter Olympic Games.

Bobsleigh and Skeleton Australia was established in 2013 to govern the sports of bobsleigh and skeleton within Australia. It is the recognised governing body for bobsleigh and skeleton for Australia with the International Bobsleigh and Skeleton Federation.

== Olympic Performances ==
Olympic Games	Country	Event	Athlete	Position	Result
1988 Winter Olympics	Australia	2-Man Bobsleigh	Angus Stuart	Pilot	23
1988 Winter Olympics	Australia	2-Man Bobsleigh	Martin Harland	Brakeman	23
1988 Winter Olympics	Australia	2-Man Bobsleigh	Adrian Di Piazza	Pilot	26
1988 Winter Olympics	Australia	2-Man Bobsleigh	Simon Dodd	Brakeman	26
1992 Winter Olympics	Australia	2-Man Bobsleigh	Paul Narracott	Pilot	30
1992 Winter Olympics	Australia	2-Man Bobsleigh	Glenn Turner	Brakeman	30
1994 Winter Olympics	Australia	2-Man Bobsleigh	Justin McDonald	Pilot	28
1994 Winter Olympics	Australia	2-Man Bobsleigh	Glenn Carroll	Brakeman	28
1994 Winter Olympics	Australia	4-Man Bobsleigh	Justin McDonald	Pilot	20
1994 Winter Olympics	Australia	4-Man Bobsleigh	Glenn Carroll	Brakeman	20
1994 Winter Olympics	Australia	4-Man Bobsleigh	Scott Walker	Brakeman	20
1994 Winter Olympics	Australia	4-Man Bobsleigh	Adam Barclay	Brakeman	20
1998 Winter Olympics	Australia	2-Man Bobsleigh	Jason Giobbi	Pilot	27
1998 Winter Olympics	Australia	2-Man Bobsleigh	Adam Barclay	Brakeman	27
1998 Winter Olympics	Australia	4-Man Bobsleigh	Jason Giobbi	Pilot	23
1998 Winter Olympics	Australia	4-Man Bobsleigh	Scott Walker	Brakeman	23
1998 Winter Olympics	Australia	4-Man Bobsleigh	Ted Polglaze	Brakeman	23
1998 Winter Olympics	Australia	4-Man Bobsleigh	Adam Barclay	Brakeman	23
2006 Winter Olympics	Australia	2-Man Bobsleigh	Jeremy Rolleston	Pilot	22
2006 Winter Olympics	Australia	2-Man Bobsleigh	Shane McKenzie	Brakeman	22
2006 Winter Olympics	Australia	2-Woman Bobsleigh	Astrid Loch-Wilkinson	Pilot	14
2006 Winter Olympics	Australia	2-Woman Bobsleigh	Kylie Reed	Brakeman	14
2006 Winter Olympics	Australia	Men's Skeleton	Shaun Boyle	Pilot	22
2006 Winter Olympics	Australia	Women's Skeleton	Michelle Steele	Pilot	13
2010 Winter Olympics	Australia	2-Man Bobsleigh	Chris Spring	Pilot	22
2010 Winter Olympics	Australia	2-Man Bobsleigh	Duncan Harvey	Brakeman	22
2010 Winter Olympics	Australia	2-Man Bobsleigh	Anthony Ryan	Brakeman	22
2010 Winter Olympics	Australia	2-Man Bobsleigh	Jeremy Rolleston	Pilot	DNF
2010 Winter Olympics	Australia	2-Man Bobsleigh	Duncan Pugh	Brakeman	DNF
2010 Winter Olympics	Australia	4-Man Bobsleigh	Jeremy Rolleston	Pilot	DNS
2010 Winter Olympics	Australia	4-Man Bobsleigh	Duncan Pugh	Brakeman	DNS
2010 Winter Olympics	Australia	4-Man Bobsleigh	Duncan Harvey	Brakeman	DNS
2010 Winter Olympics	Australia	4-Man Bobsleigh	Anthony Ryan	Brakeman	DNS
2010 Winter Olympics	Australia	2-Woman Bobsleigh	Astrid Loch-Wilkinson	Pilot	19
2010 Winter Olympics	Australia	2-Woman Bobsleigh	Cecilia Mcintosh	Brakeman	19
2010 Winter Olympics	Australia	Men's Skeleton	Anthony Deane	Pilot	23
2010 Winter Olympics	Australia	Women's Skeleton	Melissa Hoar	Pilot	12
2010 Winter Olympics	Australia	Women's Skeleton	Emma Lincoln-Smith	Pilot	10
2014 Winter Olympics	Australia	2-Man Bobsleigh	Duncan Harvey	Brakeman	26
2014 Winter Olympics	Australia	2-Man Bobsleigh	Heath Spence	Pilot	26
2014 Winter Olympics	Australia	4-Man Bobsleigh	Duncan Harvey	Brakeman	20
2014 Winter Olympics	Australia	4-Man Bobsleigh	Lucas Mata	Brakeman	20
2014 Winter Olympics	Australia	4-Man Bobsleigh	Gareth Nichols	Brakeman	20
2014 Winter Olympics	Australia	4-Man Bobsleigh	Heath Spence	Pilot	20
2014 Winter Olympics	Australia	2-Woman Bobsleigh	Jana Pittman	Pilot	29
2014 Winter Olympics	Australia	2-Woman Bobsleigh	Astrid Radjenovic	Brakeman	29
2014 Winter Olympics	Australia	Men's Skeleton	John Farrow	Pilot	17
2014 Winter Olympics	Australia	Women's Skeleton	Lucy Chaffer	Pilot	17
2014 Winter Olympics	Australia	Women's Skeleton	Michelle Steele	Pilot	14
2018 Winter Olympics	Australia	2-Man Bobsleigh	Lucas Mata	Pilot	22
2018 Winter Olympics	Australia	2-Man Bobsleigh	David Mari	Brakeman	22
2018 Winter Olympics	Australia	4-Man Bobsleigh	Lucas Mata	Pilot	25
2018 Winter Olympics	Australia	4-Man Bobsleigh	David Mari	Brakeman	25
2018 Winter Olympics	Australia	4-Man Bobsleigh	Lachlan Reidy	Brakeman	25
2018 Winter Olympics	Australia	4-Man Bobsleigh	Hayden Smith	Brakeman	25
2018 Winter Olympics	Australia	Men's Skeleton	John Farrow	Pilot	19
2018 Winter Olympics	Australia	Women's Skeleton	Jackie Narracott	Pilot	16
2022 Winter Olympics	Australia	Women's monobob	Bree Walker	Pilot	5
2022 Winter Olympics	Australia	2-Woman Bobsleigh	Bree Walker	Pilot	16
2022 Winter Olympics	Australia	2-Woman Bobsleigh	Kiara Reddingius	Brakeman	16
2022 Winter Olympics	Australia	Men's Skeleton	Nick Timmings	Pilot	25
2022 Winter Olympics	Australia	Women's Skeleton	Jaclyn Narracott	Pilot	2nd place, silver medalist(s)
2026 Winter Olympics	Australia	Women's monobob	Bree Walker	Pilot	8
2026 Winter Olympics	Australia	2-Woman Bobsleigh	Bree Walker	Pilot	10
2026 Winter Olympics	Australia	2-Woman Bobsleigh	Kiara Reddingius	Brakeman	10
2026 Winter Olympics	Australia	2-Woman Bobsleigh	Sarah Blizzard	Pilot	21
2026 Winter Olympics	Australia	2-Woman Bobsleigh	Desi Johnson	Brakeman	21
2026 Winter Olympics	Australia	Men's Skeleton	Nick Timmings	Pilot	21
