= Muswama Kambundji =

Swiss bobsledder (born 1998)

Personal information
- Born: 2 January 1996 (age 30) Bern, Switzerland

Sport
- Country: Switzerland
- Sport: Bobsleigh
- Event: Two-woman

Muswama Kambundji (born 2 January 1996) is a Swiss bobsledder. A former sprinter, she is the sister of athletes Mujinga and Ditaji Kambundji.

== Career ==
Initially a sprinter, Kambundji reached the semi-finals at the Swiss Athletics Championships in 2020, 2021, and 2023. Her personal best in the 100 meters is 11.84 seconds, and she competed at the 2017 European Athletics U23 Championships. Kambundji transitioned to the bobsleigh for the first time in the 2017-2018 winter season, partnering pilot Martina Fontanive as a pusher. Together they competed in the European Cup race and made their World Cup debut in Altenberg, Germany.

Kambundji said she appreciates the element of teamwork in bobsleigh compared to the solo nature of sprinting. However, she had an enforced break from the sport because of injury, including a back fracture. She joined pilot Melanie Hasler as a pusher in 2023, winning the two-woman bobsleigh at the 2023 Swiss Bobsleigh Championships in St. Moritz.

In January 2025, she competed for the first time alongside Debora Annen in St. Moritz. Alongside Hasler, Kambundji competed in the 2024–25 Bobsleigh World Cup, placing sixth in Winterburg in January 2025, and sixth in the final in Lillehammer in February 2025. The following month at the IBSF World Championships 2025 they paired in the two-woman bobsleigh in Lake Placid, placing seventh overall.

In January 2026, She was selected as a reserve for the Swiss team for the 2026 Winter Olympics in Italy.

== Personal life ==
Kambundji grew up in Bern as the second youngest of four daughters of a Swiss mother and a father from the Congo . She is the sister of sprinter Mujinga Kambundji and hurdler Ditaji Kambundji. She later lived in London, working in finance.
