= Nick Gleeson =

British bobsledder

Nick Gleeson OLY
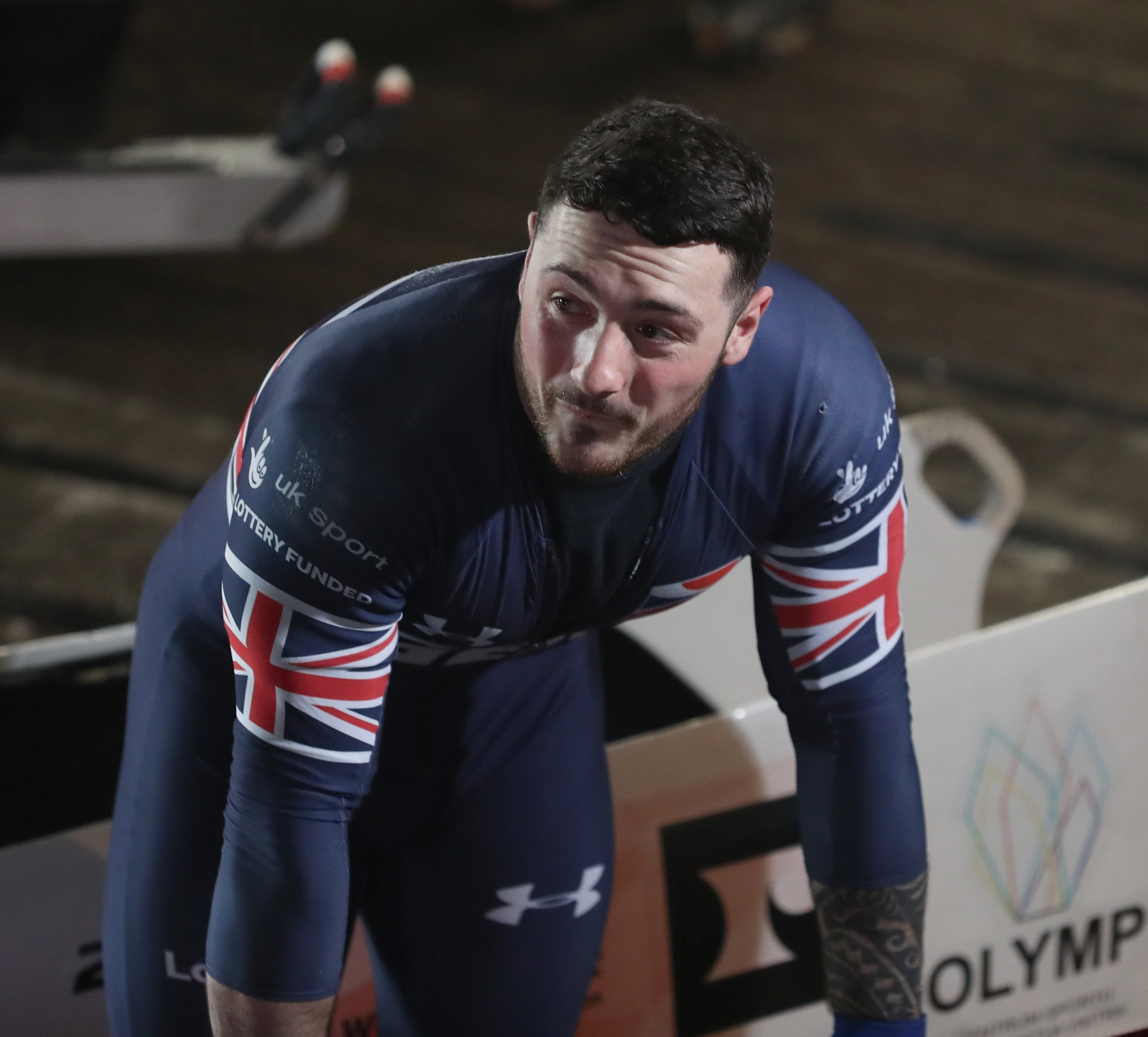
- Gleeson in 2019

Personal information
- Full name: Nicholas Gleeson
- Nationality: British
- Born: 18 October 1995 (age 29); Epsom, England
- Height: 193 cm (6 ft 4 in)
- Weight: 106 kg (234 lb)

Sport
- Sport: Bobsleigh

Nicholas "Nick" Gleeson OLY (born 18 October 1996) bobsledder. He competed in the four-man event at the 2018 Winter Olympics and the two-man and four-man events at the 2022 Winter Olympics. Gleeson also competed in the two-man event at the 2019 World Championships and the four-man event at the 2021 World Championships.
