= Kya Placide =

Welsh bobsledder & sprinter (born 2004)

Personal information
- Nationality: British (Welsh)
- Born: 5 October 2004 (age 22)
- Years active: c. 2022–present (sprinting); 2023–present (bobsleigh)

Sport
- Sport: Sprinting; Bobsleigh
- Club: Cardiff Athletic Club
Medal record
Representing Great Britain
Bobsleigh World Cup
| Silver medal – second place | 2024 Lake Placid | 2-woman |

Kya Placide (born 5 October 2004) is a Welsh bobsledder and sprinter, who won the 2023–24 IBSF Bobsleigh European Cup competition in St. Moritz, and came second in a 2023–24 Bobsleigh World Cup event in Lake Placid, both alongside Adele Nicoll.

== Athletics career ==
Placide competes in the 60 and 100 metres event for Cardiff Athletic Club. She was third in the 100 metres event at the 2022 Welsh Championships and the 60 metres event at the 2023 Welsh Indoor Championships, She also competed at the 2024 Welsh Athletics Championship. Placide has also competed in gymnastics.

== Bobsleigh career ==
Placide took up bobsleigh in 2023 at the age of 19, having been invited by fellow Welsh athlete Adele Nicoll to try the sport.

Placide made her international debut alongside Nicoll in December 2023 at the 2023–24 IBSF Bobsleigh European Cup events in Lillehammer, Norway. The pair finished third overall in the first event, and fifth in the second event. She made her Bobsleigh World Cup debut that month in Igls, alongside Nikki McSweeney. At the 2023–24 IBSF Bobsleigh European Cup in St. Moritz, Placide and Nicoll won the 2-women bobsleigh event. At the 2023–24 Bobsleigh World Cup event in Lake Placid, US, Placide and Nicoll finished second in the 2-women bobsleigh event. At the IBSF World Championships 2024, Placide and Nicoll finished 11th overall.

Placide was the travelling reserve for the British 2-women bobsleigh team at the 2026 Winter Olympics; Adele Nicoll and Ashleigh Nelson were selected for the event.
