= Vanessa Mark =

German bobsledder (born 1996)

Personal information
- Full name: Vanessa Pokuaah Mark
- Born: 2 March 1996 (age 30) Dortmund, Germany
- Height: 1.76 m (5 ft 9 in)
- Weight: 74 kg (163 lb)

Sport
- Country: Germany
- Sport: Bobsleigh
- Event: Two-woman
- Coached by: René Spies
Medal record
Women's bobsleigh
Representing Germany
World Championships
Gold medal – first place	2024 Winterberg	Two-woman

Vanessa Pokuaah Mark (born 2 March 1996) is a German bobsledder.

== Career ==
Mark made her Bobsleigh World Cup debut during the 2019–20 Bobsleigh World Cup. On 7 December 2019, she finished in third place in the two-woman event along with Kim Kalicki. During the 2020–21 Bobsleigh World Cup, she competed in the two-woman event along with Mariama Jamanka. On 21 November 2020, she won her first gold medal in only her second Bobsleigh World Cup event.

During the 2023–24 Bobsleigh World Cup, she competed in the two-woman event where she served as the push athlete along with pilot Lisa Buckwitz. Mark represented Germany at the IBSF World Championships 2024 and won a gold medal in the two woman event, along with Buckwitz.

== In popular culture ==
Vanessa Mark appeared in a pictorial for the Olympic edition of the German Playboy magazine, cover date March 2026. Also appearing in the issue is German ice hockey player Franziska Feldmeier. Two covers were published for the issue, with one featuring Mark while the other had Feldmeier.
