= Lea Haslwanter =

Austrian bobsledder (born 1999)

Personal information
- Nationality: Austrian
- Born: 9 November 1999 (age 26) Hall in Tirol, Austria
- Height: 178 cm (5 ft 10 in)
- Weight: 76 kg (168 lb)

Sport
- Country: Austria
- Sport: Athletics, Bobsleigh
- Events: Monobob, Two-woman
Medal record
Women's bobsleigh
Representing Austria
Junior European Championships U23
Silver medal – second place	2023 Winterberg	Two-woman

Lea Haslwanter (born 9 November 1999) is an Austrian bobsledder. She represented Austria at the 2026 Winter Olympics.

== Career ==
Haslwanter began sport as a track and field athlete. She initially participated in long jump before switching to hammer throw. She was noticed by the Austrian Bobsleigh and Skeleton Association, and recruited to join the Austrian bobsleigh team in 2021. She made her competitive debut at the Under-23 Junior World Championships the same year. In 2023, she earned a silver medal in the Under-23 Junior European Championships. In 2025 she set a goal of qualifying for the 2026 Winter Olympics through the Bobsleigh World Cup and Junior World Championships.

Haslwanter qualified for the 2026 Winter Olympics in two-woman. She finished 24th.

== Personal life ==
Haslwanter is a guard in the Justizwache.

== Bobsleigh results ==
=== Olympic Games ===
Event	Two-woman
(Italy) 2026 Milano Cortina	24th

=== World Championships ===
Event	Monobob	Two-woman
(Germany) 2024 Winterberg	24th	23rd
