= Sarah Blizzard (bobsledder) =

Australian bobsledder (born 1996)

Personal information
- Nationality: Australian
- Born: 19 October 1996 (age 29) Stawell, Victoria, Australia

Sport
- Country: Australia
- Sport: Athletics, Bobsleigh
- Events: Monobob, Two-woman

Sarah Blizzard (born 19 October 1996) is an Australian bobsledder. She represented Australia at the 2026 Winter Olympics.

== Career ==
Blizzard grew up in Ararat, Victoria. She began her sport career as a track and field athlete, specializing as a sprinter. She made the finals of the Stawell Gift in four consecutive years.

In 2019, she was recruited to bobsleigh to be the brakewoman for Breeana Walker's team, and made her competitive debut in late 2019. She was named as the reserve injury-substitute brakewoman for Australia's team at the 2022 Winter Olympics, but was not called up to participate.

Beginning in 2023, Blizzard transitioned to being a pilot instead of a brakewoman. During the 2023–24 season, Blizzard earned multiple podium finishes in the Europe Cup, marking her first bobsleigh podiums. She began competing regularly in the World Cup the following season. During the 2025–26 season, she finished with enough qualification points to qualify for the 2026 Winter Olympics. She competed in the two-woman competition, where she finished 21st.

Prior to the 2026 Olympics, Blizzard was commended for her sportsmanship after she loaned her two-person bobsleigh to the Dutch men's team of Dave Wesselink to assist them in qualifying for the Olympics. Wesselink's team successfully qualified using Blizzard's sled, and were present in the men's two-man competition during the Olympic games.

== Bobsleigh results ==
All results are sourced from the International Bobsleigh and Skeleton Federation (IBSF).

=== Olympic Games ===
Event	Two-woman
(Italy) 2026 Milano Cortina	21st

=== World Championships ===
Event	Monobob	Two-woman
(Germany) 2024 Winterberg	23rd	21st
