= Jasmine Jones (bobsledder) =

American bobsledder (born 1996)

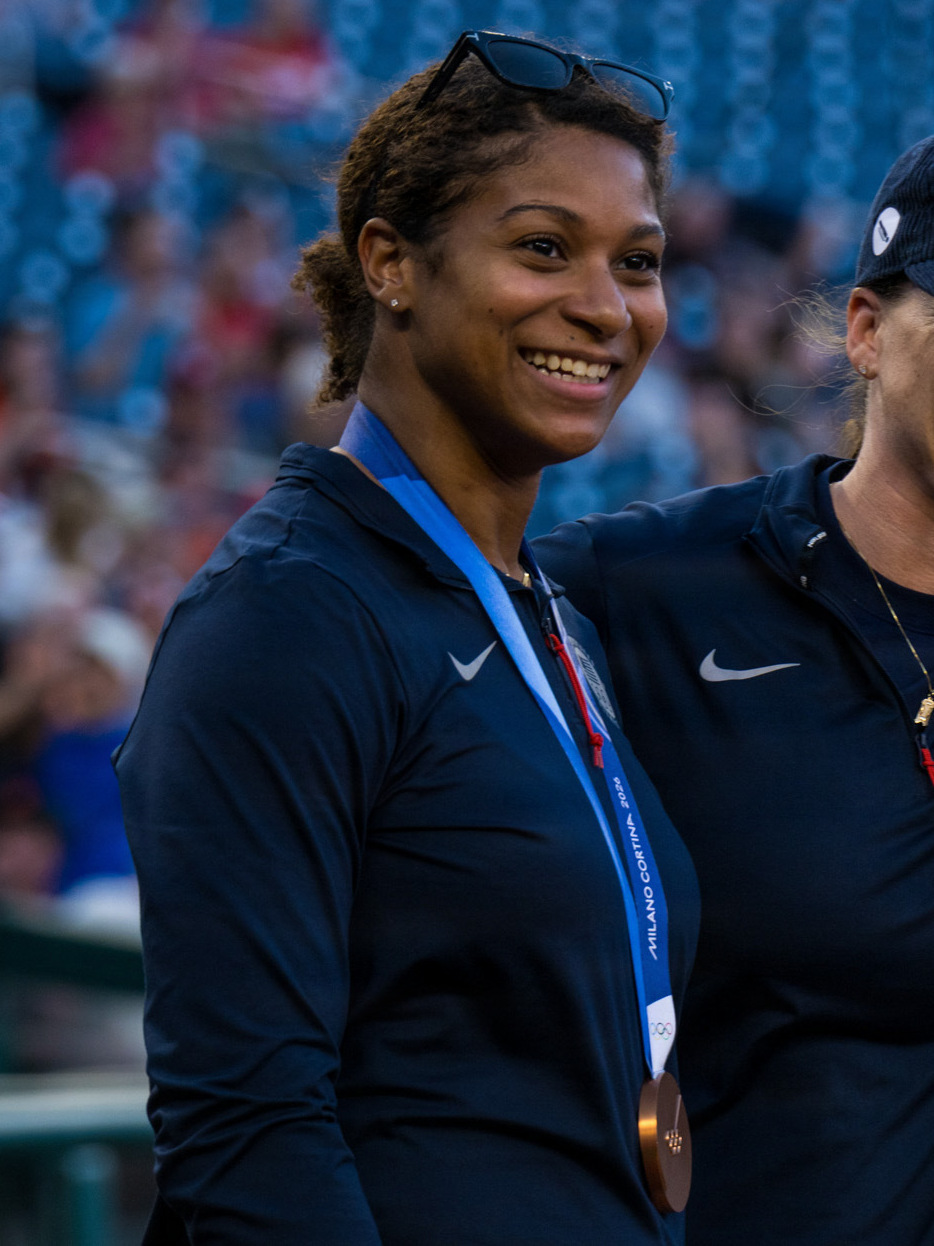
- Jones at Nationals Park in 2026

Personal information
- Full name: Jasmine Shavaugh'ne Jones
- Born: July 9, 1996 (age 30) Pennsylvania, U.S.
- Home town: Greensburg, Pennsylvania, U.S.
- Height: 5 ft 9 in (175 cm)

Sport
- Country: United States
- Sport: Bobsleigh
- Event: Two-women
Medal record
Women's bobsleigh
Representing the United States
Olympic Games
Bronze medal – third place	2026 Milano Cortina	Two-woman

Jasmine Shavaugh'ne Jones (born July 9, 1996) is an American bobsledder. She was selected to represent the United States in the two-women bobsleigh at the 2026 Winter Olympics, where she won a bronze medal.

== NCAA career ==
From Pennsylvania, Jones attended Hempfield Area High School before studying at Eastern Michigan University, where she competed in track and field, and won Mid-American Conference championships indoor titles over 200 metres and 400 metres. Jones was an All-American sprinter for the Eastern Michigan Eagles track and field team, placing 7th as the 400 m leg of their distance medley relay team at the 2018 NCAA Division I Indoor Track and Field Championships.

Representing the Eastern Michigan Eagles
Year	Meet	Venue	Event	Place	Time
2015	Mid-American Conference Indoor Track and Field Championships	Central Michigan University	60 m	8th	7.98
2015	Mid-American Conference Indoor Track and Field Championships	Central Michigan University	200 m	8th	25.22
2015	Mid-American Conference Outdoor Track and Field Championships	Ball State University	100 m	17th	12.20
2015	Mid-American Conference Outdoor Track and Field Championships	Ball State University	200 m	16th	24.73
2015	Mid-American Conference Outdoor Track and Field Championships	Ball State University	4x100 m relay	5th	45.93
2016	Mid-American Conference Indoor Track and Field Championships	University of Akron	200 m	9th	24.46
2016	Mid-American Conference Indoor Track and Field Championships	University of Akron	200 m	3rd	3:41.37
2016	Mid-American Conference Outdoor Track and Field Championships	University of Toledo	200 m	5th	24.38
2016	Mid-American Conference Outdoor Track and Field Championships	University of Toledo	400 m	3rd	54.83
2016	Mid-American Conference Outdoor Track and Field Championships	University of Toledo	4x100 m relay	1st	45.72
2016	Mid-American Conference Outdoor Track and Field Championships	University of Toledo	4x400 m relay	6th	3:48.47
2017	Mid-American Conference Indoor Track and Field Championships	Eastern Michigan University	200 m	1st	24.31
2017	Mid-American Conference Indoor Track and Field Championships	Eastern Michigan University	400 m	3rd	55.50
2017	Mid-American Conference Outdoor Track and Field Championships	Western Michigan University	200 m	1st	23.60
2017	Mid-American Conference Outdoor Track and Field Championships	Western Michigan University	400 m	1st	54.08
2017	Mid-American Conference Outdoor Track and Field Championships	Western Michigan University	4x100 m relay	1st	45.45
2017	Mid-American Conference Outdoor Track and Field Championships	Western Michigan University	4x400 m relay	2nd	3:42.11
2017	2017 NCAA Division I Outdoor Track and Field Championships	University of Kentucky	200 m	65th	23.74
2018	Mid-American Conference Indoor Track and Field Championships	Bowling Green University	200 m	1st	23.98
2018	Mid-American Conference Indoor Track and Field Championships	Bowling Green University	400 m	1st	54.56
2018	Mid-American Conference Indoor Track and Field Championships	Bowling Green University	4x400 m	2nd	3:43.56
2018	2018 NCAA Division I Indoor Track and Field Championships	Texas A&M University	Distance Medley Relay	7th	11:04.81
2018	Mid-American Conference Outdoor Track and Field Championships	University at Buffalo	200 m	3rd	23.59
2018	Mid-American Conference Outdoor Track and Field Championships	University at Buffalo	400 m	2nd	53.64
2018	Mid-American Conference Outdoor Track and Field Championships	University at Buffalo	4x100 m relay	1st	45.27
2018	Mid-American Conference Outdoor Track and Field Championships	University at Buffalo	4x400 m relay	3rd	3:42.24
2018	2018 NCAA Division I Outdoor Track and Field Championships	University of South Florida	200 m	52nd	23.20
2018	2018 NCAA Division I Outdoor Track and Field Championships	University of South Florida	400 m	69th	54.41

== Bobsled career ==
During her senior year at Eastern Michigan University, Jones was contemplating turning professional in track and field, but was contacted by Olympic bobsleigh medalist Elana Meyers Taylor, who asked Jones to consider bobsledding. Jones took part in bobsleigh for the first time in 2018 part at the USA Bobsled and Skeleton rookie camp at the Olympic Training Center, and made the American national team for the first time in 2019.

She is a senior airman in the United States Air Force.

Alongside Kaillie Humphries in the two-woman bobsled, Jones had success in the 2024–25 and 2025–26 Bobsleigh World Cup. The pairing was subsequently selected for the 2026 Winter Olympics, and earned the bronze medal in the event.

== Personal life ==
She is based in Lake Placid, New York, and has a daughter, Jade. She joined the Air Force World Class Athlete Program in 2023.
