= Linda Weiszewski =

Polish bobsledder (born 1999)

Personal information
- Nationality: Polish
- Born: 11 April 1999 (age 27) Viersen, Germany

Sport
- Country: Poland
- Sport: Bobsleigh
- Events: Monobob, Two-woman
Medal record
Women's bobsleigh
Representing Poland
Junior World Championships
Bronze medal – third place	2024 St. Moritz	Monobob
Bronze medal – third place	2025 Altenberg	Monobob
Bronze medal – third place	2025 Altenberg	Two-woman
Junior European Championships
Bronze medal – third place	2023 Winterberg	Monobob

Linda Weiszewski (born 11 April 1999) is a German-born Polish bobsledder. She represented Poland at the 2026 Winter Olympics in the monobob and two-woman competitions.

== Career ==
Weiszewski was born in Viersen, Germany. When she was 11, her family moved to Poland. She participated in athletics and fire-fighting sport in her youth, and won a medal in the latter in 2014.

Weiszewski began competing in bobsleigh in 2019, after expressing interest after watching a four-man event. She was forced to miss the 2020–21 season after suffering an injury while training at Lillehammer, but returned to competition the following season. In 2023, she earned bronze in monobob at the Junior European Championships. In 2024, Weiszewski earned a bronze medal in monobob at the Junior World Championships, making her the first female Polish athlete to win a medal at the Junior World Championships. The following year, she earned bronze in both the monobob and two-women events for the Junior World Championships. She has competed in the IBSF Bobsleigh World Cup since 2023.

In 2026, she was selected to represent Poland at the 2026 Winter Olympics in both the monobob and two-woman competitions. She and her brakewoman Klaudia Adamek in the two-woman competition were the only Polish competitors in bobsleigh in the 2026 Olympics.

== Bobsleigh results ==
All results are sourced from the International Bobsleigh and Skeleton Federation (IBSF).

=== Olympic Games ===
Event	Monobob	Two-woman
(Italy) 2026 Milano Cortina	17th	18th

=== World Championships ===
Event	Monobob	Two-woman
(Switzerland) 2023 St. Moritz	18th	16th
(Germany) 2024 Winterberg	19th	15th

== Personal life ==
During the 2026 Winter Olympics Weiszewski made her relationship with another woman public, and in May 2026 the pair announced their engagement.
