= Alysia Rissling =

Canadian bobsledder

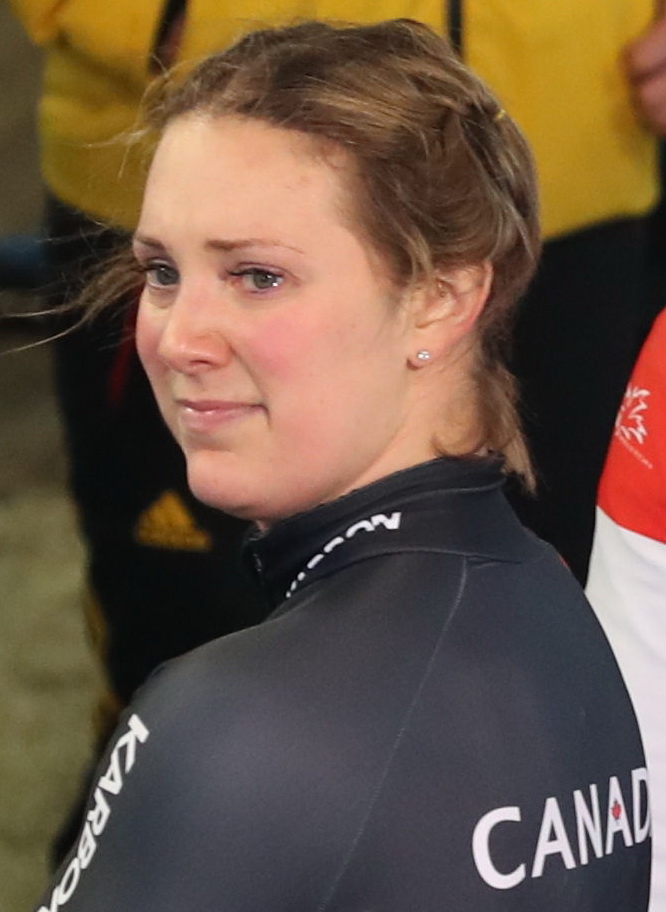
- Alysia Rissling in Altenberg in 2019

Personal information
- National team: Canada
- Born: November 16, 1988 (age 38) Edmonton, Alberta
- Education: Kinesiology, B.S., University of Alberta
- Height: 180 cm (5 ft 11 in)
- Weight: 77 kg (170 lb)
- Website: www.risslingbobsleigh.com

Sport
- Sport: Bobsleigh
- Position: Pilot
- Partner: Heather Moyse

Achievements and titles
- Olympic finals: 2018 Winter Olympics

Alysia Rissling (born November 16, 1988) is a Canadian bobsledder. In 2015, she was the pilot for the first all-woman team in an official four-man bobsleigh race after the event became gender neutral. She competed in the two-woman bobsleigh event for Canada at the 2018 Winter Olympics with Heather Moyse; the pair finished in 6th place.

== Biography ==
Rissling was born on November 16, 1988, in Edmonton, Alberta. She received a scholarship to the University of Alberta for track and field and basketball. Rissling graduated in 2011 with her Bachelor of Science degree in Kinesiology.

Rissling played basketball for the University of Alberta Pandas from 2006 until her graduation in 2011. During her time with the Pandas, the team qualified four times to the Canadian Interuniversity Sport (CIS) (now U Sports) national championships winning silver in 2007 and bronze in 2009. In 2012, she moved to Calgary to take up bobsledding.

Prior to her first world cup event, Rissling had to raise CA$100,000 in order to purchase a sled for competition, after the Canadian bobsleigh team decided to instead allocate the funds towards the men's team. She raised the money through sponsorships and a waitressing job in a Calgary diner.

== Career ==
On February 7, 2015, in Park City, Utah, as part of the North American cup tour, Rissling piloted the first four-woman team in an official four-man bobsled race with Julia Corrente, Courtenay Farrington, and Josee Theoret. The team was the first female four-person team to compete following the decision to make the event gender neutral in late 2014. The four came in seventh with a time of 1:41.34.

Rissling participated in the 2017 Bobsleigh World Cup in Pyeongchang, South Korea, with brakeman Cynthia Appiah. The duo won bronze at the event with a time of 1:44.06.

Rissling is overall ranked sixth for the 2017–18 Bobsleigh season. In November 2017, she came in seventh in both Lake Placid, New York, and Park City, Utah, with Kristen Bujnowski. On November 24, 2017, Rissling, alongside Cynthia Appiah, finished in seventh in Whistler, British Columbia. In January 2018 with Heather Moyse, she placed fourth in St. Moritz, Switzerland, and fifth place in Königsee, Germany.

== 2018 Winter Olympics ==
On January 24, 2018, Team Canada announced the 24 athletes that would be competing for Canada in the bobsleigh and skeleton events. Rissling qualified and made her Olympic debut. She was the pilot for Heather Moyse in the two-woman bobsled. The pair finished 6th after four runs in the bobsled event; their time was 1.18 seconds off that of the gold-medal winners.
