= Adele Nicoll =

British athlete & bobsledder (born 1996)

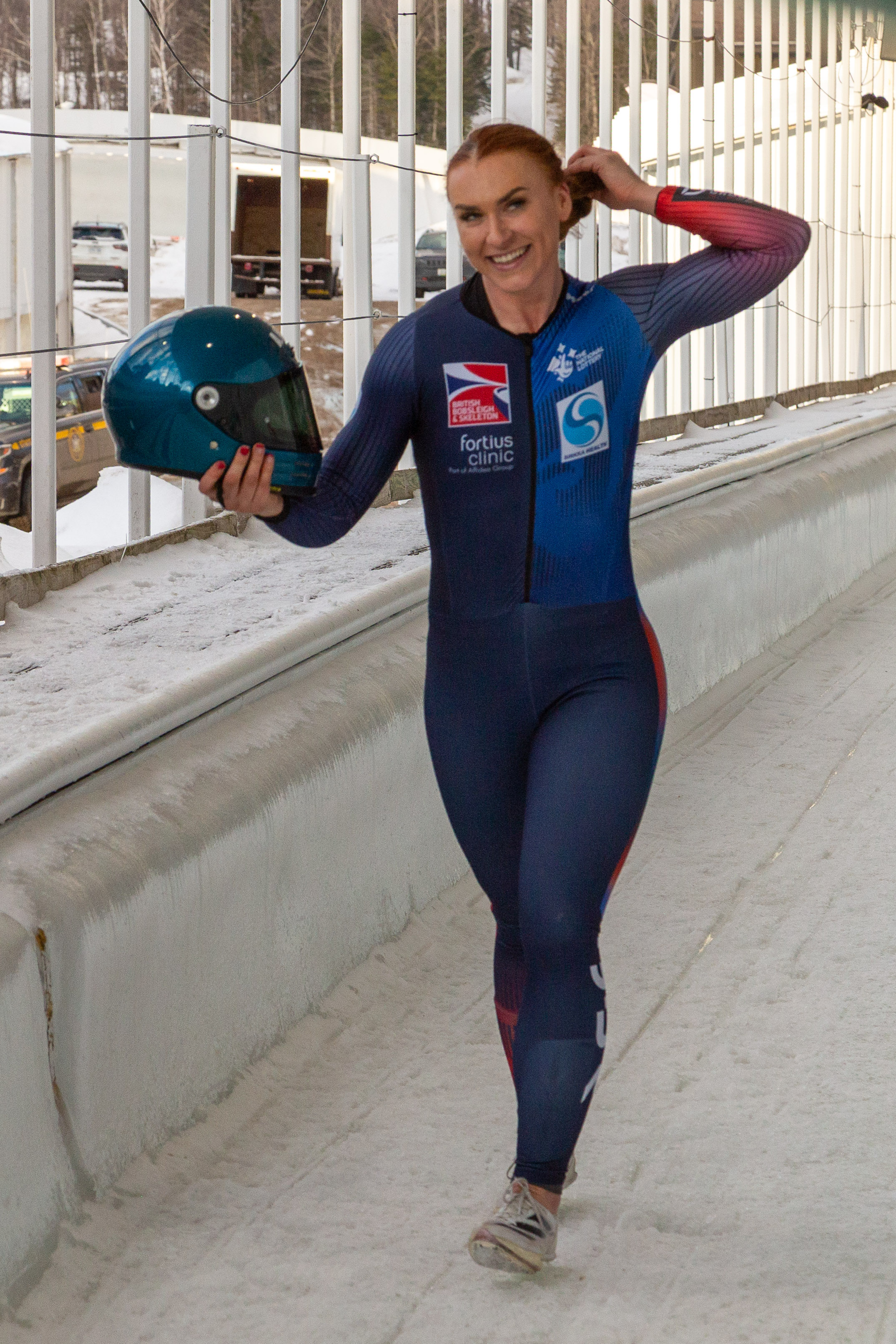
- Nicoll at the IBSF World Championships 2025

Personal information
- Full name: Adel Mia Nicoll
- Nationality: British (Welsh)
- Born: 28 September 1996 (age 30) Shrewsbury, England
- Years active: c. 2011– (athletics); 2020– (bobsleigh)
- Height: 5 ft 8.5 in (174 cm)
- Weight: 80 kg (176 lb)

Sport
- Sport: Shot put; Discus throw; Bobsleigh
- Club: Birchfield Harriers

Achievements and titles
- National finals: 2014–2024 inclusive (athletics)
- Commonwealth finals: 2022
Medal record
Representing Great Britain
Bobsleigh World Cup
Silver medal – second place	2022 Sigulda	2-woman
Silver medal – second place	2024 Lake Placid	2-woman
British Athletics Championships
Bronze medal – third place	2021 Manchester	Shot put
Gold medal – first place	2022 Manchester	Shot put
Gold medal – first place	2023 Manchester	Shot put
Gold medal – first place	2025 Birmingham	Shot put
British Indoor Athletics Championships
Bronze medal – third place	2022 Birmingham	Shot put

Adel Mia Nicoll (born 28 September 1996) is a British shot putter, discus thrower and bobsledder. She has won multiple Welsh Athletics Championships events, and won the shot put event at the 2022, 2023 and 2025 UK Athletics Championships. She won the 2023–24 IBSF Bobsleigh European Cup in St. Moritz alongside Kya Placide, and came second in the 2021–22 Bobsleigh World Cup event in Sigulda, Latvia alongside Mica McNeill, and the 2023–24 Bobsleigh World Cup event in Lake Placid alongside Kya Placide. Nicoll was a reserve for the 2022 Winter Olympics, and competed for Wales at the 2022 Commonwealth Games.

== Athletics career ==
Nicoll started competing in athletics for the Birchfield Harriers at the age of 14. She reached the final of the shot put event at the 2013 World Youth Championships in Athletics. Nicoll was not selected in the Welsh squads for the 2014 or 2018 Commonwealth Games; she only reached the B standard for the 2018 Games.

Nicoll came third in the under-23s shot put event at the 2017 European Throwing Cup. As of 2021, she had won the previous eight shot put events at the Welsh Athletics Championship; her distance at the 2021 Welsh Athletics Championships was above the qualifying threshold for the 2022 Commonwealth Games. At the 2021 British Athletics Championships, Nicoll came third in the shot put event.

Nicoll came third in the shot put event at the 2022 British Indoor Athletics Championships, throwing a personal best distance of 17.02 metres. The event was a week after she had returned from the 2022 Winter Olympics in Beijing. At the 2022 Welsh Athletics Championships, Nicoll won both the shot put and discus events. In June 2022, she was selected in the Welsh team for the 2022 Commonwealth Games in the shot put event. Later that month, she became the British shot put champion after winning the shot put event at the 2022 British Athletics Championships; she had previously finished in third place in seven editions of the championships. At the Commonwealth Games, Nicoll finished 8th in the shot put event with a distance of 17.30 metres. Following the Games, Nicoll only trained in shot put one day a week, as her funding from UK Sport covers only bobsleigh and not athletics. Nicoll won the shot put event at the 2023 British Athletics Championships and in 2025 won her third British outdoor title at the 2025 UK Athletics Championships.

== Bobsleigh career ==
In 2020, Nicoll took up bobsleigh after being approached on Instagram by Mica McNeill, who had seen videos on social media of Nicoll exercising. She spent most of the 2020–21 season in training, and lost almost 20 kilograms (3.1 st; 44 lb) of body weight in order to compete.

At the 2021–22 Bobsleigh World Cup, Nicoll competed in some events with McNeill, who also competed in events alongside Mica Moore and Montell Douglas. Nicoll, Moore and Douglas were all attempting to earn a place with McNeill for the 2-woman event at the 2022 Winter Olympics. In January 2022, Nicoll and McNeill finished second in the World Cup event in Sigulda, Latvia. It was the first time that a British woman had won a Bobsleigh World Cup medal for 13 years, and it was Nicoll's second World Cup event. That month, McNeill and Douglas were confirmed as Britain's selections for the Olympics; Nicoll travelled to the Games as a reserve. Two weeks after the Olympics, she attended a bobsleigh driving school in Lake Placid, New York, US. In the 2022–23 season, Nicoll started working as a pilot, in the monobob event.

For the 2023–24 season, Nicoll moved from brakewoman to pilot in the 2-woman bobsleigh, where she competed alongside Kya Placide. At the 2023–24 IBSF Bobsleigh European Cup in Lillehammer, Nicoll and debutant Placide finished third in the first 2-women bobsleigh event, and fifth in the second competition. Nicoll and Maddison Ilsley finished sixth in the third competition at the event. At the European Cup in St. Moritz, Nicoll and Placide won the 2-women bobsleigh event, and Nicoll came second in the monobob event. At the 2023–24 Bobsleigh World Cup event in Lake Placid, US, Nicoll and Placide finished second in the 2-women bobsleigh event. Nicoll competed alongside Ashleigh Nelson in the 2-women event at the 2025 IBSF World Championships. In the 2025–26 season, Nicoll competed alongside both Kya Placide and Ashleigh Nelson.

Nicoll was selected for the 2026 Winter Olympics in both the monobob and 2-woman bob event, alongside Ashleigh Nelson. She was the first Briton to be selected for the monobob event at the Olympics. At the Games, Nicoll finished 18th in the monobob and 15th in the two-woman.

== Personal life ==
Nicoll is from Welshpool, Wales. She attended Welshpool High School, later studied clinical neuroscience at Cardiff Metropolitan University, graduating in 2020, and also earned a doctorate in clinical psychology in 2023. Nicoll has appeared on the BBC Three programme Go Hard Or Go Home.
