= Cynthia Appiah =

Canadian thrower & bobsledder (born 1990)

Cynthia Appiah OLY
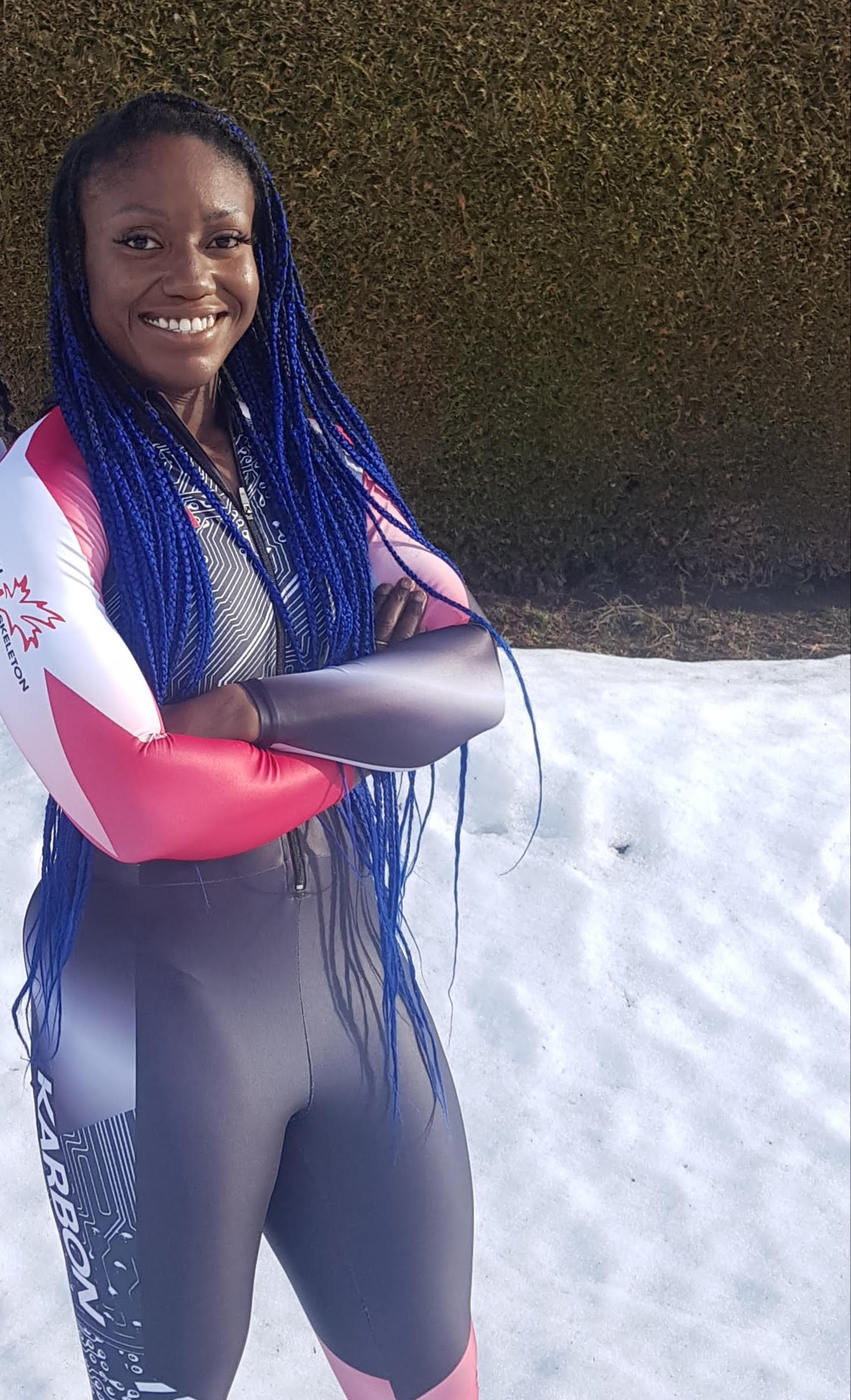
- Appiah in Innsbruk-Igls, Austria during the 2020-2021 FIBT IBSF World Cup Circuit

Personal information
- National team: Canada
- Born: Cynthia Appiah Serwaah; May 15, 1990 (age 36) North York, Ontario, Canada
- Education: York University
- Height: 1.73 m (5 ft 8 in)
- Weight: 79 kg (174 lb)
- Other interests: Jeopardy; Track & Field

Sport
- Sport: Bobsleigh; Monobob; Track & Field
- Position: Brake-woman(2014-2018); Pilot (2018-pr)
- Events: shot put, hammer, discus, bobsleigh, Monobob
- Turned pro: 2015

Cynthia Appiah OLY (born Cynthia Appiah Serwaah; May 15, 1990) is a Canadian bobsledder who has been competing in the sport since 2014. Appiah made her World Cup debut in 2016. In 2018, she shifted to the pilot position and later made her World Cup debut as a bobsleigh pilot in the 2019/2020 season. At the IBSF World Championships 2021 in Altenberg, Germany, Appiah placed fifth and ninth in monobob and two-woman bobsleigh, respectively.

== Early years ==
Cynthia Appiah was born on May 15, 1990, to Ghanaian immigrants, James and Mary Appiah (née Serwaah) in North York, Ontario, Canada. Appiah's journey towards sports began at the age of 8 when she first joined the Toronto Blue Jays Rookie League, a social initiative by the team's foundation, Jays Care, to support youth in low-income and underprivileged communities of Toronto. Appiah has stated that though she was "pretty terrible, [she] still had a lot of fun."

== Career ==
Appiah officially joined the world of elite sport in 2008 when she made the transition from provincial to national competitions as a track & field throwing athlete for York University, specializing in the hammer throw and shot put. In the summer of 2011, she attended her first Bobsleigh Canada Skeleton (BCS) test camp, which by chance, happened to be taking place at her university. After a successful test camp, Appiah declined the invitation to join the training camp at Lake Placid so she could focus on completing her final year at York and earn her degree - a Bachelor of Arts in history with a minor in Psychology - though she would keep in communication with the BCS organization for her eventual return to the world of bobsleigh. Appiah competed as a York Lion from 2008 to 2013 and was named Athlete of the Year (2012–2013) in her final year.

=== Life as a bobsleigh brakewoman ===
In the 2013–2014 season, Appiah had a standout rookie season on the World Cup circuit where she pushed both two-time Olympic champion, Kaillie Humphries, to a gold and bronze medal, along with rookie pilot Alysia Rissling to her first ever World Cup bronze medal. Appiah excelled as a brakewoman with fast pushes and medal-winning performances at all levels while working her way through the system, sliding provincially and on the North America's Cup circuit, through to the World Cup circuit. In the season leading up to the 2018 Winter Olympics in Pyeongchang, South Korea, Appiah's determination and athleticism led her to be the top brakewoman in the BCS program. Regardless, Appiah was named as an alternate brakewoman to the Olympic team and therefore would not be officially competing at the Olympics.

=== Switching to the pilot seat ===
After contemplating leaving the sport altogether, Appiah decided to give the sport another chance, but this time as a pilot. Appiah channelled the frustration from the games into fuel and purpose to excel as a pilot, giving her more control over reaching her Olympic goals. With this new sense of purpose in mind, Appiah headed back to Lake Placid, where she would rebuild her bobsleigh career from square one. She took part in a driver's school and practiced mastering the art of piloting a sled on the Development Bobsleigh Team. No less than a year after making the switch to the front seat, Appiah set a new Ice House "start record" from the pilot bar in 2019 at 5.41[seconds]. Later that year, Appiah was awarded the L. Lamont Gordon Award, an award given to a bobsleigh or skeleton athlete who embodies the spirit of Team Canada.

In January 2022, Appiah was named to Canada's 2022 Olympic team. She competed in the women's monobob and two-woman events, coming in 8th in each event.

Appiah was named in the Canadian team for the 2026 Winter Olympics. She finished 13th in the monobob and 14th in two-woman.

== Personal life ==
Cynthia Appiah is a Toronto native and the daughter of Ghanaian-Canadian immigrants. She has one older brother and two younger sisters.

Appiah qualified to appear on Jeopardy!. Her episode aired on October 28, 2025. She finished in third place.

== Activism ==
Appiah is a vocal advocate for the benefits of sports in enriching the lives of others. She is an active ambassador with the Jays Care Foundation the charitable arm of the Toronto Blue Jays who provides sports programming to underserved youth in communities across Canada, Fast and Female, a Canadian charity with a mission to keep self-identified girls aged 8–14 healthy and active in sports, and Classroom Champions, a non-profit organization co-founded by former US-bobsledder Steve Mesler and sister, Dr. Leigh Mesler Parise, that connects volunteer Olympians, Paralympians, Student-Athletes, and Professional Athletes with K-8 classrooms through a social and emotional learning curriculum and mentorship experience to improve engagement, build growth mindsets and inspire positive classroom culture.
