= Breeana Walker =

Australian bobsledder (born 1992)

Breeana (Bree) Walker
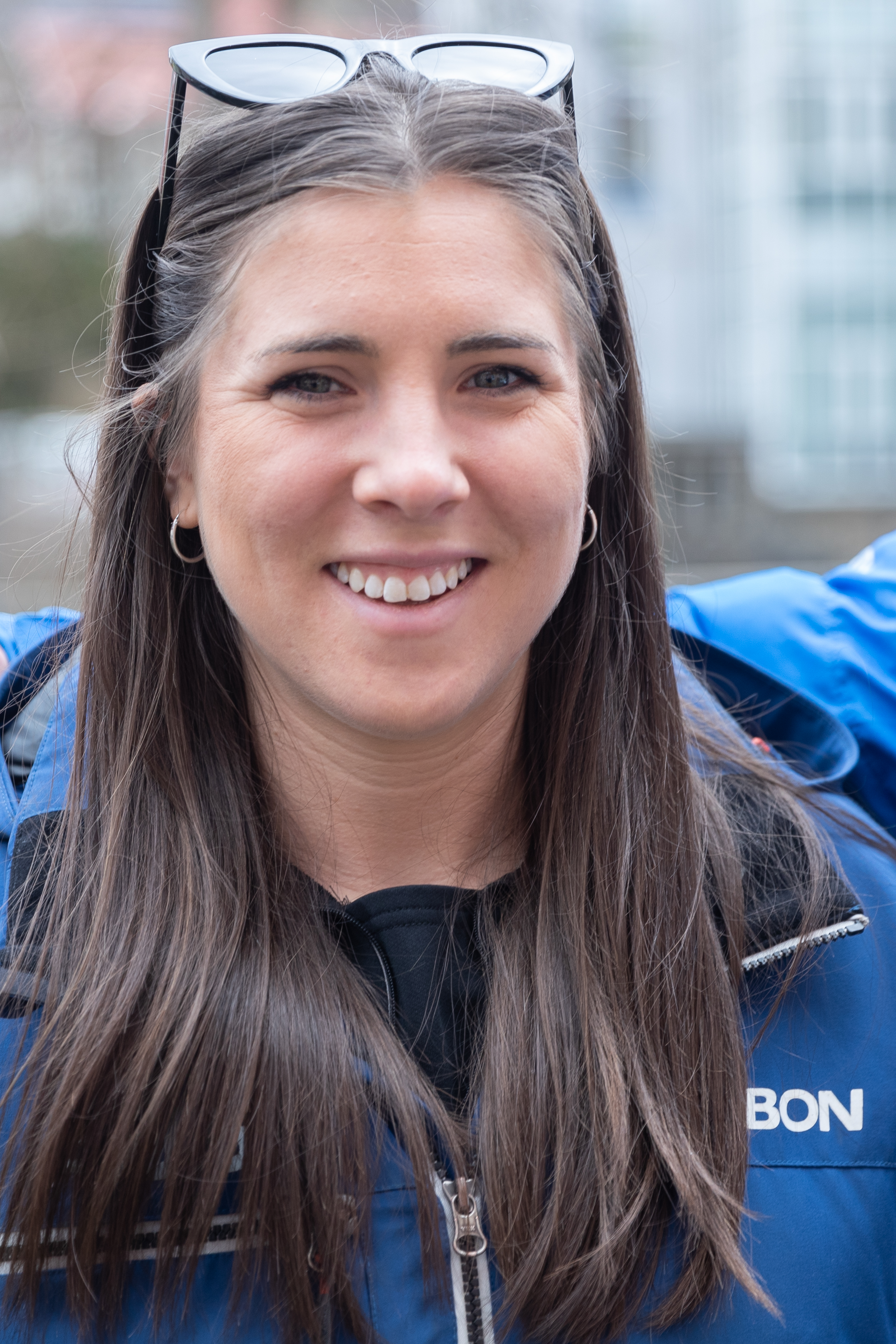
- Walker in 2021

Personal information
- Nationality: Australian
- Born: 28 August 1992 (age 34) Mount Waverley, Australia
- Education: Deakin University
- Height: 1.69 m (5 ft 7 in)
- Weight: 74 kg (163 lb)

Sport
- Country: Australia
- Sport: Bobsleigh
- Events: Monobob, two-woman
- Turned pro: 2017
Medal record
Women's bobsleigh
Representing Australia
World Cup
Event	1st	2nd	3rd
Monobob	6	5	6
Total	6	5	6
- Update as of 18 January 2026

Breeana "Bree" Walker (born 28 August 1992) is an Australian bobsledder. She started as a hurdler and switched to bobsledding in 2016. In 2018–19 she made her debut in the Bobsleigh World Cup. She won several monobob competitions.

== Career ==
=== Beginnings in track and field and switching to bobsleigh ===
Walker comes from the Melbourne suburb of Mount Evelyn. She began her sporting career as a Track and Field athlete. She specialized in the running disciplines, particularly the 400-meter hurdles. After graduating high school, she trained at Doncaster Athletic Club and became Victoria's champion in the 400m hurdles in 2013. In 2013, Walker received a full Track and Field scholarship to the University of Arkansas at Little Rock. After one year of training over season she did not match the times she ran in Australia as the focus in US training was on building muscle mass, and the weight gain was a detriment to her performance. Upon her return to Australia, she was coached by Peter Fortune, Cathy Freeman's longtime coach.

In 2016, Walker decided to switch to Bobsleigh because she had set herself the goal of participating in the Olympics and had doubts about qualifying as a Track and Field athlete. As role models, she named two Australian hurdlers Jana Pittman and Kim Brennan, who had also changed sports; Pittman represented Australia as a bobsleigh pilot at the 2014 Winter Olympics, Brennan was the 2016 Olympic champion in rowing. Sliding Sports Australia (SSA) took Walker to the national team after attending a talent camp. In October 2016, she completed a self-financed training course to become a bobsleigh pilot at the Whistler Sliding Center in Canada.

=== World Cup success (since 2018) ===
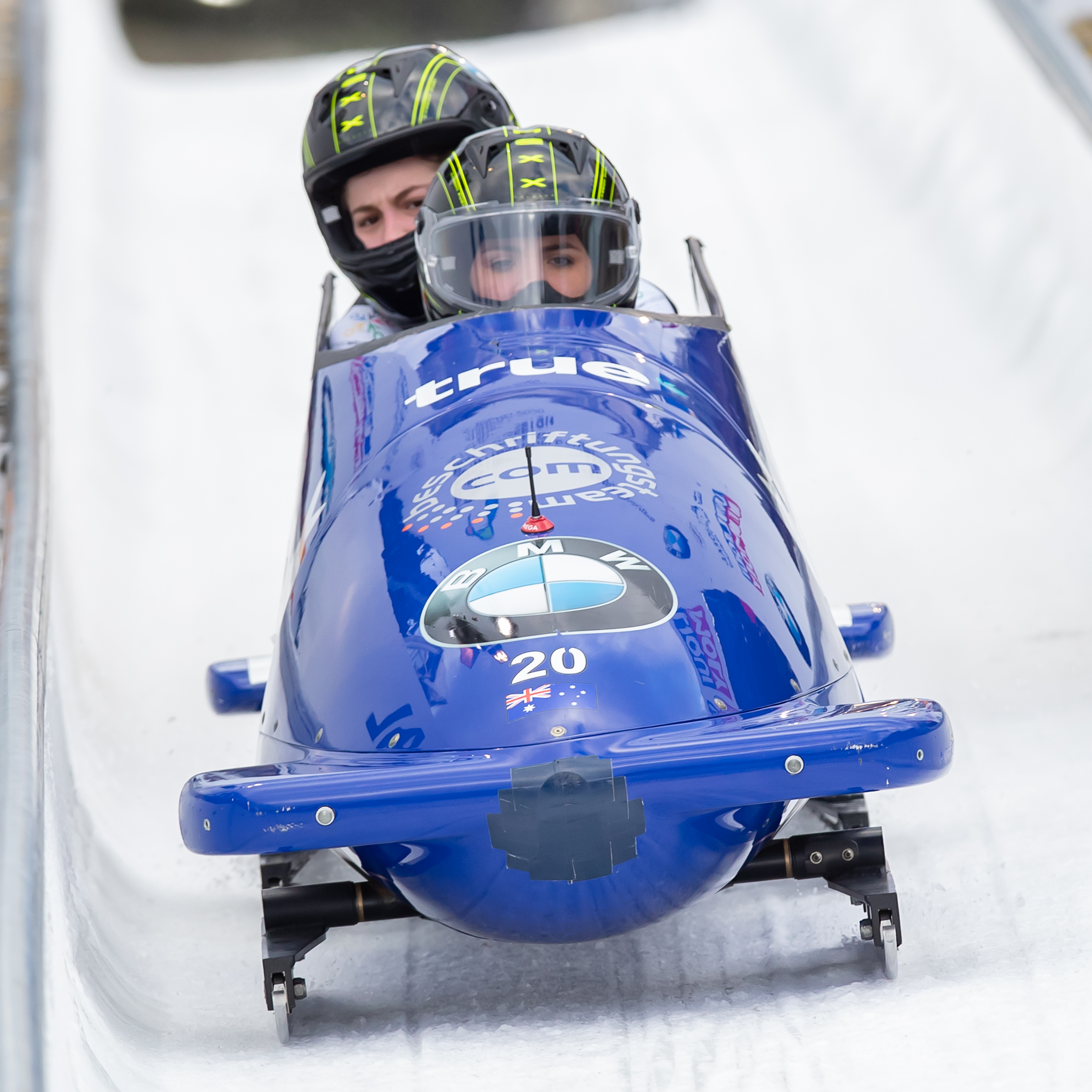
Walker with Stefanie Preiksa at the 2020 World Championships in Altenberg

In the summer of 2018, the International Olympic Committee decided to include monobob in the Olympic program from 2022 as the second discipline in women's bobsleigh. Walker later described the appearance of the monobob as a "great opportunity", the use of standardized material also gave smaller nations the opportunity to compete at the front. She won the first women's Monobob World Series races in Lillehammer on 4 and 5 November 2018.

Due to the COVID-19 pandemic and Australia's strict quarantine regulations, Walker made the decision to stay in Germany after the 2019/20 season to continue her training. She moved to Frankfurt with her former partner, German bobsledder Christian Hammers and trained at the Landesstützpunkt Wiesbaden, where she had worked with her former Physical/Push coach Tim Restle; whom she worked with since the summer of 2018. In December 2020, she won the second race of the Monobob World Series 2020–21 in Innsbruck-Igls. The competition was the first Monobob race to take place at the same location as the World Cup event in two-woman bobsleigh, in which the Walker/Blizzard duo finished eighth and thus achieving the teams first top ten result in the event.

At the 2022 Winter Olympics, she placed fifth in the Women's Monobob Event. She and Kiara Reddingius were placed 16th in the two-person bobsleigh.

Walker finished eighth in the monobob and 10th in the two-woman at the 2026 Winter Olympics.

== Personal life ==
Walker studied a Bachelor of Health and Physical Education at Deakin University.
