= IBSF World Championships 2017 – Women =

Women at the IBSF World Championships 2017
- Venue: Königssee bobsleigh, luge, and skeleton track
- Location: Königssee, Germany
- Dates: 24–25 February
- Competitors: 31 from 19 nations
- Winning time: 2:35.35

Medalists
gold medal	Jacqueline Lölling	Germany
silver medal	Tina Hermann	Germany
bronze medal	Lizzy Yarnold	Great Britain

The Women competition at the 2017 World Championships was held on 24 and 25 February 2017.

== Results ==
The first two runs were held on 24 February 2017, with the second run being cancelled due to snow, and the last two runs on 25 February 2017.

Rank	Bib	Athlete	Country	Run 1	Rank	Run 2	Rank	Run 3	Rank	Run 4	Rank	Total	Behind
1st place, gold medalist(s)	6	Jacqueline Lölling	Germany	52.02	1	Cancelled		51.74	2	51.59	1	2:35.35	
2nd place, silver medalist(s)	9	Tina Hermann	Germany	52.08	2	Cancelled		51.83	3	51.69	2	2:35.60	+0.25
3rd place, bronze medalist(s)	15	Lizzy Yarnold	Great Britain	52.29	4	Cancelled		51.71	1	52.08	5	2:36.08	+0.73
4	7	Anna Fernstädt	Germany	52.44	7	Cancelled		51.91	4	52.04	3	2:36.39	+1.04
5	1	Kim Meylemans	Belgium	52.35	5	Cancelled		52.12	5	52.07	4	2:36.54	+1.19
6	8	Elisabeth Vathje	Canada	52.27	3	Cancelled		52.15	6	52.42	11	2:36.84	+1.49
7	11	Lelde Priedulēna	Latvia	52.44	7	Cancelled		52.25	7	52.27	8	2:36.96	+1.61
8	13	Mirela Rahneva	Canada	52.37	6	Cancelled		52.25	7	52.50	15	2:37.12	+1.77
9	3	Elena Nikitina	Russia	52.47	9	Cancelled		52.45	11	52.21	7	2:37.13	+1.78
10	12	Laura Deas	Great Britain	52.76	13	Cancelled		52.34	10	52.11	6	2:37.21	+1.86
11	10	Janine Flock	Austria	52.56	10	Cancelled		52.27	9	52.45	13	2:37.28	+1.93
12	16	Jane Channell	Canada	52.69	12	Cancelled		52.66	14	52.43	12	2:37.78	+2.43
13	4	Kendall Wesenberg	United States	52.67	11	Cancelled		52.96	16	52.37	10	2:38.00	+2.65
14	2	Kimberley Bos	Netherlands	53.11	17	Cancelled		52.63	13	52.33	9	2:38.07	+2.72
15	18	Maria Orlova	Russia	52.87	15	Cancelled		52.57	12	52.73	17	2:38.17	+2.82
16	17	Savannah Graybill	United States	52.81	14	Cancelled		53.20	19	52.46	14	2:38.47	+3.12
17	22	Jaclyn Narracott	Australia	53.05	16	Cancelled		52.99	17	52.53	16	2:38.57	+3.22
18	23	Marina Gilardoni	Switzerland	53.42	18	Cancelled		53.00	18	52.92	18	2:39.34	+3.99
19	14	Annie O'Shea	United States	53.64	21	Cancelled		52.81	15	52.95	19	2:39.40	+4.05
20	24	Renata Khuzina	Russia	53.50	20	Cancelled		53.30	21	53.27	20	2:40.07	+4.72
21	26	Takako Oguchi	Japan	53.48	19	Cancelled		53.46	23	DNQ			
22	21	Joska le Conte	Netherlands	53.94	24	Cancelled		53.32	22	DNQ			
23	20	Donna Creighton	Great Britain	53.80	22	Cancelled		53.46	23	DNQ			
24	27	Maya Pedersen-Bieri	Norway	54.10	26	Cancelled		53.28	20	DNQ			
25	25	Maria Mazilu	Romania	53.84	23	Cancelled		53.62	25	DNQ			
26	19	Yulia Kanakina	Russia	53.97	25	Cancelled		54.00	27	DNQ			
27	29	Katie Tannenbaum	United States Virgin Islands	54.39	27	Cancelled		53.95	26	DNQ			
28	30	Valentina Margaglio	Italy	54.47	28	Cancelled		54.03	28	DNQ			
29	31	Marta Orłowska	Poland	54.64	29	Cancelled		54.77	30	DNQ			
30	28	Maria Montejano	Spain	55.07	30	Cancelled		54.35	29	DNQ			
31	5	Sara Lavrenčič	Slovenia	56.54	31	Cancelled		55.91	31	DNQ			
