= IBSF World Championships 2016 – Women =

Women's skeleton at the IBSF World Championships 2016
- Venue: Olympic Sliding Centre Innsbruck, Igls
- Date: 19–20 February
- Competitors: 26 from 15 nations
- Winning time: 3:36.50

Medalists
| gold medal | Tina Hermann | Germany |
| silver medal | Janine Flock | Austria |
| bronze medal | Elena Nikitina | Russia |

The Women's skeleton event in the IBSF World Championships 2016 was on 19 and 20 February 2016.

== Results ==
Run 1 was started on 19 February at 09:49. and the last two runs on 20 February at 09:49.

| Rank | Bib | Athlete | Country | Run 1 | Run 2 | Run 3 | Run 4 | Total | Behind |
|---|---|---|---|---|---|---|---|---|---|
| 1st place, gold medalist(s) | 4 | Tina Hermann | Germany | 53.96 | 54.38 | 54.04 | 54.12 | 3:36.50 | |
| 2nd place, silver medalist(s) | 6 | Janine Flock | Austria | 54.11 | 54.39 | 54.15 | 54.31 | 3:36.96 | +0.46 |
| 3rd place, bronze medalist(s) | 13 | Elena Nikitina | Russia | 54.53 | 54.36 | 54.06 | 54.14 | 3:37.09 | +0.59 |
| 4 | 7 | Marina Gilardoni | Switzerland | 54.59 | 54.35 | 54.18 | 54.22 | 3:37.34 | +0.84 |
| 5 | 1 | Annie O'Shea | United States | 54.25 | 54.63 | 54.21 | 54.28 | 3:37.37 | +0.87 |
| 6 | 10 | Elisabeth Vathje | Canada | 54.41 | 54.69 | 54.09 | 54.29 | 3:37.48 | +0.98 |
| 7 | 8 | Sophia Griebel | Germany | 54.57 | 54.30 | 54.40 | 54.28 | 3:37.55 | +1.05 |
| 8 | 21 | Kimberley Bos | Netherlands | 54.45 | 54.64 | 54.38 | 54.31 | 3:37.78 | +1.28 |
| 9 | 5 | Jacqueline Lölling | Germany | 54.29 | 54.81 | 54.51 | 54.36 | 3:37.97 | +1.47 |
| 10 | 15 | Katie Uhlaender | United States | 54.53 | 54.71 | 54.49 | 54.63 | 3:38.36 | +1.86 |
| 11 | 3 | Laura Deas | Great Britain | 54.46 | 54.75 | 54.65 | 54.55 | 3:38.41 | +1.91 |
| 12 | 9 | Lelde Priedulēna | Latvia | 54.46 | 54.74 | 54.66 | 54.58 | 3:38.44 | +1.94 |
| 13 | 2 | Jane Channell | Canada | 54.44 | 55.27 | 54.42 | 54.37 | 3:38.50 | +2.00 |
| 14 | 11 | Kim Meylemans | Belgium | 54.58 | 54.83 | 54.61 | 54.52 | 3:38.54 | +2.04 |
| 15 | 18 | Joska le Conte | Netherlands | 54.81 | 54.88 | 54.78 | 55.23 | 3:39.70 | +3.20 |
| 15 | 12 | Kendall Wesenberg | United States | 54.90 | 54.96 | 54.89 | 54.95 | 3:39.70 | +3.20 |
| 17 | 20 | Jaclyn Narracott | Australia | 55.11 | 55.57 | 54.69 | 54.63 | 3:40.00 | +3.50 |
| 18 | 14 | Donna Creighton | Great Britain | 54.96 | 55.11 | 55.12 | 54.84 | 3:40.01 | +3.51 |
| 19 | 17 | Lanette Prediger | Canada | 55.07 | 55.14 | 55.12 | 55.10 | 3:40.43 | +3.93 |
| 20 | 16 | Yulia Kanakina | Russia | 55.16 | 55.49 | 54.93 | 55.08 | 3:40.66 | +4.16 |
| 21 | 23 | Anastasia Shlapak | Russia | 55.35 | 55.52 | 54.86 | | | |
| 22 | 22 | Carina Mair | Austria | 55.27 | 55.43 | 55.43 | | | |
| 23 | 19 | Takako Oguchi | Japan | 55.70 | 55.80 | 55.48 | | | |
| 24 | 25 | Maria Montejano | Spain | 55.64 | 56.03 | 55.38 | | | |
| 25 | 25 | Katie Tannenbaum | United States Virgin Islands | 56.29 | 56.68 | 56.62 | | | |
| 26 | 26 | Marta Orłowska | Poland | 56.89 | 56.94 | 56.92 | | | |
