= IBSF World Championships 2023 – Women =

Women at the IBSF World Championships 2023
- Venue: St. Moritz-Celerina Olympic Bobrun
- Location: St. Moritz, Switzerland
- Dates: 26–27 January
- Competitors: 32 from 21 nations
- Winning time: 4:33.57

Medalists
gold medal	Susanne Kreher	Germany
silver medal	Kimberley Bos	Netherlands
bronze medal	Mirela Rahneva	Canada

The Women competition at the IBSF World Championships 2023 was held on 26 and 27 January 2023.

== Results ==
The first two runs were started on 26 January at 13:30 and the last two runs on 27 January at 13:30.

Rank	Bib	Athlete	Country	Run 1	Rank	Run 2	Rank	Run 3	Rank	Run 4	Rank	Total	Behind
1st place, gold medalist(s)	7	Susanne Kreher	Germany	1:08.12	1	1:08.26	3	1:08.77	3	1:08.42	2	4:33.57	
2nd place, silver medalist(s)	8	Kimberley Bos	Netherlands	1:08.23	2	1:08.69	7	1:08.48	1	1:08.18	1	4:33.58	+0.01
3rd place, bronze medalist(s)	9	Mirela Rahneva	Canada	1:08.57	5	1:08.20	2	1:09.08	9	1:08.56	3	4:34.41	+0.84
4	18	Janine Flock	Austria	1:08.91	9	1:08.11	1	1:08.82	5	1:08.61	5	4:34.45	+0.88
5	10	Tina Hermann	Germany	1:08.47	3	1:08.50	5	1:09.05	7	1:08.60	4	4:34.62	+1.05
6	3	Jane Channell	Canada	1:08.52	4	1:08.36	4	1:08.81	4	1:09.07	9	4:34.76	+1.19
7	1	Jacqueline Lölling	Germany	1:08.69	6	1:08.56	6	1:09.34	12	1:08.67	6	4:35.26	+1.69
8	30	Kim Meylemans	Belgium	1:08.78	7	1:08.99	11	1:08.94	6	1:08.77	7	4:35.48	+1.91
9	14	Laura Deas	Great Britain	1:09.14	11	1:08.75	8	1:09.05	7	1:09.11	10	4:36.05	+2.48
10	12	Hallie Clarke	United States	1:08.90	8	1:09.00	12	1:09.21	10	1:09.24	11	4:36.35	+2.78
11	16	Jaclyn Narracott	Australia	1:08.92	10	1:08.93	10	1:09.43	14	1:09.32	13	4:36.60	+3.03
12	15	Zhao Dan	China	1:09.95	21	1:08.85	9	1:09.21	10	1:08.91	8	4:36.92	+3.35
13	13	Kendall Wesenberg	United States	1:09.96	22	1:09.05	13	1:09.40	13	1:09.31	12	4:37.72	+4.15
14	20	Valentina Margaglio	Italy	1:09.20	12	1:09.33	16	1:08.51	2	1:11.03	20	4:38.07	+4.50
15	6	Hannah Neise	Germany	1:09.45	15	1:09.18	14	1:09.82	16	1:09.82	17	4:38.27	+4.70
16	2	Nicole Silveira	Brazil	1:09.55	17	1:09.35	17	1:10.20	20	1:09.41	14	4:38.51	+4.94
17	4	Anna Fernstädt	Czech Republic	1:09.42	14	1:09.63	19	1:10.10	17	1:09.57	16	4:38.72	+5.15
18	11	Brogan Crowley	Great Britain	1:09.88	20	1:09.30	15	1:10.12	18	1:09.49	15	4:38.79	+5.22
19	24	Kellie Delka	Puerto Rico	1:09.35	13	1:09.52	18	1:10.27	22	1:09.87	19	4:39.01	+5.44
20	5	Kelly Curtis	United States	1:10.23	25	1:09.63	19	1:09.81	15	1:09.82	17	4:39.49	+5.92
21	19	Li Yuxi	China	1:09.72	18	1:09.66	21	1:10.35	23	Did not advance			
22	27	Sara Schmied	Switzerland	1:09.84	19	1:09.94	23	1:10.14	19	Did not advance			
23	22	Tabitha Stoecker	Great Britain	1:09.54	16	1:09.77	22	1:11.07	26	Did not advance			
24	25	Dārta Zunte	Estonia	1:09.97	23	1:10.53	25	1:10.24	21	Did not advance			
25	26	Anna Saulite	Austria	1:10.05	24	1:10.72	27	1:10.51	24	Did not advance			
26	23	Katharina Eigenmann	Liechtenstein	1:10.56	27	1:10.71	26	1:10.71	25	Did not advance			
27	21	Alessia Crippa	Italy	1:10.77	28	1:10.22	24	1:11.59	27	Did not advance			
28	28	Laura Vargas	Colombia	1:11.34	29	1:12.53	30	1:11.69	28	Did not advance			
29	29	Ana Torres-Quevedo	Spain	1:12.51	31	1:12.49	29	1:12.07	29	Did not advance			
30	31	Shannon Galea	Malta	1:12.69	32	1:12.48	28	1:12.66	30	Did not advance			
	32	Katie Tannenbaum	United States Virgin Islands	1:11.89	30	1:13.18	31	Did not start					
	17	Agathe Bessard	France	1:10.47	26	Did not start							
