= 2016–17 Skeleton World Cup =

Winners
- Men's: Martins Dukurs (LAT)
- Women's: Jacqueline Lölling (GER)

Competitions
- Venues: 8 (8 events)

The 2016–17 Skeleton World Cup was a multi-race series over a season for skeleton. The season started on 2 December 2016 in Whistler, Canada and ended on 17 March 2017 in Pyeongchang, South Korea. The World Cup was organised by the IBSF (formerly the FIBT) who also run World Cups and Championships in skeleton. The season was sponsored by BMW.

== Calendar ==
| Venue | Date | Details |
|---|---|---|
| (Canada) Whistler | 2–3 December | |
| (United States) Lake Placid | 16–17 December | |
| (Germany) Altenberg | 6–7 January | |
| (Germany) Winterberg | 14–15 January | |
| (Switzerland) St. Moritz | 20 January | |
| (Germany) Königssee | 27–28 January | |
| (Austria) Igls | 3 February | |
| (South Korea) Pyeongchang | 17 March | |

== Results ==
=== Men ===
| Event: | Gold: | Time | Silver: | Time | Bronze: | Time |
|---|---|---|---|---|---|---|
| (Canada) Whistler | Yun Sung-bin; South Korea | 1:45.86 (52.84 / 53.02) | Alexander Tretiakov; Russia | 1:45.98 (52.99 / 52.99) | Matthew Antoine; United States | 1:46.22 (53.24 / 52.98) |
| (United States) Lake Placid | Alexander Tretiakov; Russia | 1:46.49 (53.27 / 53.22) | Matthew Antoine; United States | 1:46.92 (53.45 / 53.47) | Yun Sung-bin; South Korea | 1:46.94 (53.24 / 53.70) |
| (Germany) Altenberg | Christopher Grotheer; Germany | 1:52.30 (56.20 / 56.10) | Martins Dukurs; Latvia | 1:52.60 (56.42 / 56.18) | Axel Jungk; Germany | 1:52.77 (56.44 / 56.33) |
| (Germany) Winterberg | Martins Dukurs; Latvia | 1:52.04 (56.14 / 55.90) | Tomass Dukurs; Latvia | 1:52.66 (56.16 / 56.50) | Alexander Tretiakov; Russia | 1:52.71 (56.51 / 56.20) |
| (Switzerland) St. Moritz | Martins Dukurs; Latvia | 2:15.10 (1:07.85 / 1:07.25) | Yun Sung-bin; South Korea | 2:15.13 (1:07.63 / 1:07.50) | Nikita Tregubov; Russia | 2:15.65 (1:07.95/ 1:07.70) |
| (Germany) Königssee | Alexander Tretiakov; Russia | 1:40.41 (50.27 / 50.14) | Yun Sung-bin; South Korea | 1:40.46 (50.07 / 50.39) | Alexander Gassner; Germany | 1:40.60 (50.36 / 50.24) |
| (Austria) Igls | Martins Dukurs; Latvia | 1:43.89 (52.01 / 51.88) | Alexander Tretiakov; Russia | 1:44.47 (52.31 / 52.16) | Yun Sung-bin; South Korea | 1:44.57 (52.27 / 52.30) |
| (South Korea) Pyeongchang | Martins Dukurs; Latvia | 1:41.51 (50.87 / 50.64) | Yun Sung-bin; South Korea | 1:41.52 (50.69 / 50.83) | Tomass Dukurs; Latvia | 1:42.16 (51.20 / 50.96) |

=== Women ===
| Event: | Gold: | Time | Silver: | Time | Bronze: | Time |
|---|---|---|---|---|---|---|
| (Canada) Whistler | Elisabeth Vathje; Canada | 1:49.25 (54.52 / 54.73) | Jacqueline Lölling; Germany | 1:50.09 (54.76 / 55.33) | Tina Hermann; Germany | 1:50.11 (54.99 / 55.12) |
| (United States) Lake Placid | Janine Flock; Austria | 1:49.77 (54.84 / 54.93) | Lizzy Yarnold; United Kingdom | 1:50.58 (54.94 / 55.64) | Mirela Rahneva; Canada | 1:50.92 (55.39 / 55.53) |
| (Germany) Altenberg | Jacqueline Lölling; Germany | 1:57.17 (58.58 / 58.59) | Tina Hermann; Germany | 1:57.61 (58.90 / 58.71) | Janine Flock; Austria | 1:57.71 (58.94 / 58.77) |
| (Germany) Winterberg | Elisabeth Vathje; Canada | 58.02 | Jacqueline Lölling; Germany | 58.12 | Mirela Rahneva; Canada | 58.14 |
| (Switzerland) St. Moritz | Mirela Rahneva; Canada | 2:16.53 (1:08.49 / 1:08.04) | Kendall Wesenberg; United States | 2:18.36 (1:09.28 / 1:09.08) | Janine Flock; Austria | 2:18.51 (1:09.29 / 1:09.22) |
| (Germany) Königssee | Jacqueline Lölling; Germany | 1:43.21 (51.70 / 51.51) | Tina Hermann; Germany | 1:43.66 (52.09 / 51.57) | Anna Fernstädt; Germany | 1:43.67 (51.93 / 51.74) |
| (Austria) Igls | Tina Hermann; Germany | 1:48.15 (54.17 / 53.98) | Mirela Rahneva; Canada | 1:48.31 (54.03 / 54.28) | Janine Flock; Austria | 1:48.39 (54.12 / 54.27) |
| (South Korea) Pyeongchang | Jacqueline Lölling; Germany | 1:45.68 (52.93 / 52.75) | Elena Nikitina; Russia | 1:45.98 (53.18 / 52.80) | Kimberley Bos; Netherlands | 1:46.03 (53.15 / 52.88) |

== Standings ==
=== Men ===
| Pos. | Racer | (Canada) WHI | (United States) LPL | (Germany) ALT | (Germany) WIN | (Switzerland) STM | (Germany) KON | (Austria) IGL | (South Korea) PYE | Points |
|---|---|---|---|---|---|---|---|---|---|---|
| 1 | Martins Dukurs (LAT)* | 4 | 5 | 2 | 1 | 1 | 6 | 1 | 1 | 1662 |
| 2 | Yun Sung-bin (KOR) | 1 | 3 | 5 | 5 | 2 | 2 | 3 | 2 | 1623 |
| 3 | Alexander Tretiakov (RUS) | 2 | 1 | – | 3 | 4 | 1 | 2 | 4 | 1454 |
| 4 | Axel Jungk (GER) | 6 | 6 | 3 | 6 | 7 | 4 | 4 | 7 | 1448 |
| 5 | Christopher Grotheer (GER) | 9 | 7 | 1 | 4 | 8 | 5 | 5 | 8 | 1425 |
| 6 | Alexander Gassner (GER) | 7 | 9 | 4 | 8 | 5 | 3 | 8 | 6 | 1392 |
| 7 | Matthew Antoine (USA) | 3 | 2 | 9 | 9 | 9 | 10 | 7 | 10 | 1322 |
| 8 | Nikita Tregubov (RUS) | 5 | 8 | 6 | 6 | 3 | – | 6 | 5 | 1256 |
| 9 | Tomass Dukurs (LAT) | 13 | 4 | 7 | 2 | 6 | 9 | dsq | 3 | 1218 |
| 10 | Dominic Edward Parsons (GBR) | 8 | 10 | 12 | 12 | 10 | 7 | 9 | 13 | 1144 |
| 11 | Nathan Crumpton (USA) | 14 | 11 | 10 | 10 | 13 | 13 | 12 | 15 | 1008 |
| 12 | Rhys Thornbury (NZL) | 16 | 12 | 11 | 11 | 21 | 8 | 10 | 10 | 1006 |
| 13 | Barrett Martineau (CAN) | 10 | 14 | 8 | 13 | 11 | 12 | 16 | 19 | 970 |
| 14 | Ander Mirambell (ESP) | 15 | 13 | 16 | 15 | 14 | 18 | 17 | 25 | 744 |
| 15 | Dave Greszczyszyn (CAN) | 11 | 17 | 23 | 17 | 24 | 19 | 24 | 12 | 654 |
| 16 | Mattia Gaspari (ITA) | – | – | 14 | 21 | 25 | 11 | 10 | 9 | 646 |
| 17 | Marco Rohrer (SUI) | 24 | 26 | 17 | 18 | 12 | 20 | 13 | 21 | 627 |
| 18 | Jack Thomas (GBR) | 25 | 25 | 15 | 16 | 18 | 16 | 18 | 20 | 604 |
| 19 | Matthias Guggenberger (AUT) | 26 | 21 | 13 | 19 | – | 14 | 14 | 22 | 572 |
| 20 | Hiroatsu Takahashi (JPN) | 18 | 18 | 18 | 26 | 19 | 14 | 26 | 27 | 530 |
| 21 | Kyle Tress (USA) | 20 | 19 | 25 | 14 | 20 | 24 | 19 | – | 481 |
| 22 | Kevin Boyer (CAN) | 17 | 24 | 19 | 25 | 23 | 17 | 21 | – | 447 |
| 23 | Egor Veselov (RUS) | 12 | 22 | – | – | – | – | 15 | 18 | 368 |
| 24 | Florian Auer (AUT) | – | – | 20 | 22 | 27 | – | 20 | 16 | 320 |
| 25 | Katsuyuki Miyajima (JPN) | – | – | 27 | 23 | 16 | 22 | 22 | 30 | 310 |
| 26 | Lee Han-sin (KOR) | 22 | 15 | – | – | 22 | 23 | – | – | 266 |
| 27 | Riet Graf (SUI) | – | – | 26 | 27 | 15 | – | 29 | 26 | 232 |
| 28 | Evgeny Rukosuev (RUS) | – | – | 22 | 20 | 17 | – | – | – | 212 |
| 29 | Alexander Auer (AUT) | 23 | 23 | 21 | – | – | – | – | 24 | 207 |
| 30 | John Farrow (AUS) | 19 | 16 | – | – | – | – | – | – | 170 |
| 31 | Kim Ji-soo (KOR) | – | – | – | – | – | – | 24 | 16 | 141 |
| 32 | Stefan Geisler (AUT) | – | – | – | 24 | 26 | – | 26 | – | 117 |
| 33 | Rasmus Ottosson (SWE) | 21 | – | – | – | – | 28 | – | 29 | 114 |
| 34 | John Daly (USA) | – | – | – | – | – | - | – | 14 | 112 |
| 35 | Manuel Schwärzer (ITA) | – | – | – | – | – | 26 | 28 | 28 | 92 |
| 36 | Philipp Mölter (CZE) | – | – | 24 | – | – | 27 | – | – | 77 |
| 37 | Joseph Luke Cecchini (ITA) | dsq | 20 | – | – | – | – | – | – | 68 |
| 38 | Ronald Auderset (SUI) | 27 | 27 | – | – | – | – | – | – | 64 |
| 39 | Konstantin Khoroshko (RUS) | – | – | – | – | – | 21 | – | – | 62 |
| 40 | Evan Neufeldt (AUT) | – | – | – | – | – | - | – | 23 | 50 |
| 41 | Nicholas Timmings (AUS) | – | – | – | – | – | – | 23 | – | 50 |
| 42 | Artem Drozdov (RUS) | – | – | – | – | – | 25 | – | – | 40 |

- (*Champion 2016)

=== Women ===
| Pos. | Racer | (Canada) WHI | (United States) LPL | (Germany) ALT | (Germany) WIN | (Switzerland) STM | (Germany) KON | (Austria) IGL | (South Korea) PYE | Points |
|---|---|---|---|---|---|---|---|---|---|---|
| 1 | Jacqueline Lölling (GER) | 2 | 5 | 1 | 2 | 8 | 1 | 9 | 1 | 1591 |
| 2 | Tina Hermann (GER)* | 3 | 10 | 2 | 5 | 7 | 2 | 1 | 9 | 1493 |
| 3 | Mirela Rahneva (CAN) | 5 | 3 | 18 | 3 | 1 | 4 | 2 | 5 | 1475 |
| 4 | Janine Flock (AUT) | 11 | 1 | 3 | 4 | 3 | 7 | 3 | 12 | 1449 |
| 5 | Elisabeth Vathje (CAN) | 1 | 8 | 14 | 1 | 4 | 14 | 5 | 6 | 1386 |
| 6 | Laura Deas (GBR) | 6 | 10 | 6 | 8 | 6 | 17 | 7 | 9 | 1240 |
| 7 | Lelde Priedulēna (LAT) | 9 | 7 | 5 | 9 | 14 | 5 | 8 | 14 | 1224 |
| 8 | Anna Fernstädt (GER) | 8 | 4 | 4 | 10 | 11 | 3 | – | 7 | 1192 |
| 9 | Lizzy Yarnold (GBR) | 4 | 2 | 9 | 6 | 15 | 11 | – | 4 | 1162 |
| 10 | Anne O'Shea (USA) | 6 | 6 | 10 | 13 | 17 | 10 | 11 | 19 | 1058 |
| 11 | Jane Channell (CAN) | 16 | 16 | 11 | 12 | 9 | 11 | 6 | 13 | 1040 |
| 12 | Kimberley Bos (NED) | 20 | 12 | 13 | 7 | 5 | – | 13 | 3 | 988 |
| 13 | Kendall Wesenberg (USA) | 19 | 13 | 14 | 10 | 2 | 19 | 18 | 11 | 950 |
| 14 | Elena Nikitina (RUS) | 17 | 18 | – | 18 | 20 | 16 | 4 | 2 | 814 |
| 15 | Kim Meylemans (BEL) | dnf | 21 | 16 | 14 | 18 | 6 | 10 | 16 | 766 |
| 16 | Katie Uhlaender (USA) | – | – | 12 | 20 | 12 | 8 | 14 | 8 | 756 |
| 17 | Maria Orlova (RUS) | 13 | 9 | – | 19 | 19 | 15 | 12 | 18 | 732 |
| 18 | Jaclyn Narracott (AUS) | 21 | 17 | 17 | 21 | 16 | 13 | 17 | 15 | 708 |
| 19 | Joska le Conte (NED) | 18 | 21 | 19 | 15 | 10 | 18 | 19 | 21 | 680 |
| 20 | Marina Gilardoni (SUI) | 14 | 14 | 8 | 17 | 13 | – | – | 20 | 660 |
| 21 | Yulia Kanakina (RUS) | 12 | 20 | 7 | 16 | 21 | – | – | 17 | 610 |
| 22 | Nozomi Komuro (JPN) | – | – | 21 | 23 | 23 | 9 | 21 | 22 | 432 |
| 23 | Maria Montejano (ESP) | 24 | 25 | 20 | 22 | 24 | 21 | 20 | 24 | 429 |
| 24 | Katie Tannenbaum (ISV) | 22 | 24 | 22 | 24 | 22 | 22 | 23 | 25 | 404 |
| 25 | Savannah Graybill (USA) | 10 | 15 | – | – | – | – | – | – | 248 |
| 26 | Takako Oguchi (JPN) | 15 | 19 | – | – | – | – | – | – | 178 |
| 27 | Mun Ra-young (KOR) | 23 | 23 | – | – | – | – | – | 22 | 156 |
| 28 | Renata Khuzina (RUS) | – | – | – | – | – | – | 15 | – | 104 |
| 29 | Donna Creighton (GBR) | – | – | – | – | – | – | 16 | – | 96 |
| 30 | Alina Tararychenkova (RUS) | – | – | – | – | – | 20 | – | – | 68 |
| 31 | Johanna Balassa (AUT) | – | – | – | – | – | – | 22 | – | 56 |

- (*Champion 2016)
