= IBSF World Championships 2020 – Women =

Bobsleigh and skeleton competition

Women at the IBSF World Championships 2020
- Venue: Altenberg bobsleigh, luge, and skeleton track
- Location: Altenberg, Germany
- Dates: 28–29 February
- Competitors: 28 from 17 nations
- Winning time: 3:54.52

Medalists
gold medal	Tina Hermann	Germany
silver medal	Marina Gilardoni	Switzerland
bronze medal	Janine Flock	Austria

The women's competition at the IBSF World Championships 2020 was held on 28 and 29 February 2020.

== Results ==
The first two runs were held on 28 February at 09:34. The last two runs were started on 29 February at 09:34.

Rank	Bib	Athlete	Country	Run 1	Rank	Run 2	Rank	Run 3	Rank	Run 4	Rank	Total	Behind
1st place, gold medalist(s)	8	Tina Hermann	Germany	59.52	5	58.94	2	58.29	3	57.77	1	3:54.52	
2nd place, silver medalist(s)	10	Marina Gilardoni	Switzerland	58.96	1	58.87	1	58.26	2	58.65	7	3:54.74	+0.22
3rd place, bronze medalist(s)	4	Janine Flock	Austria	59.50	4	59.43	5	58.11	1	58.69	8	3:55.73	+1.21
4	7	Jacqueline Lölling	Germany	59.66	7	59.28	3	58.38	4	58.59	6	3:55.91	+1.39
5	5	Elena Nikitina	Russia	59.27	2	59.33	4	58.93	7	58.49	5	3:56.02	+1.50
6	12	Sophia Griebel	Germany	59.65	6	59.72	7	58.66	5	58.36	3	3:56.39	+1.87
7	11	Anna Fernstädtová	Czech Republic	59.66	7	59.68	6	58.88	6	58.28	2	3:56.50	+1.98
8	15	Jane Channell	Canada	59.36	3	1:00.50	17	59.30	9	58.45	4	3:57.61	+3.09
9	13	Kim Meylemans	Belgium	1:00.44	17	59.82	8	59.07	8	58.69	8	3:58.02	+3.50
10	14	Kendall Wesenberg	United States	1:00.14	11	59.96	9	59.61	16	58.93	11	3:58.64	+4.12
11	21	Yulia Kanakina	Russia	59.90	9	1:00.00	10	59.44	12	59.56	19	3:58.90	+4.38
11	17	Renata Khuzina	Russia	1:00.30	13	1:00.16	12	59.38	10	59.06	15	3:58.90	+4.38
13	26	Lin Huiyang	China	1:00.38	16	1:00.25	14	59.63	17	59.01	13	3:59.27	+4.75
14	2	Agathe Bessard	France	1:00.34	15	1:00.16	12	59.48	13	59.33	16	3:59.31	+4.79
15	24	Kimberley Bos	Netherlands	1:00.23	12	1:00.65	21	59.41	11	59.05	14	3:59.34	+4.82
16	6	Mirela Rahneva	Canada	59.97	10	1:00.08	11	59.86	20	59.60	20	3:59.51	+4.99
17	23	Valentina Margaglio	Italy	1:00.55	19	1:00.45	16	59.58	15	58.94	12	3:59.52	+5.00
18	9	Megan Henry	United States	1:00.57	20	1:00.44	15	59.81	18	58.76	10	3:59.58	+5.06
19	18	Laura Deas	Great Britain	1:00.31	14	1:00.59	19	59.57	14	59.42	18	3:59.89	+5.37
20	20	Savannah Graybill	United States	1:00.44	17	1:00.56	18	59.84	19	59.37	17	4:00.21	+5.69
21	16	Madelaine Smith	Great Britain	1:01.55	26	1:00.95	22	1:00.07	21	Did not advance			
22	3	Alessia Crippa	Italy	1:01.15	22	1:01.00	23	1:00.46	23	Did not advance			
23	19	Kimberley Murray	Great Britain	1:02.37	28	1:00.60	20	1:00.15	22	Did not advance			
24	1	Nicole Rocha Silveira	Brazil	1:01.48	25	1:01.76	26	1:00.63	24	Did not advance			
25	25	Zhu Yangqi	China	1:01.17	23	1:02.26	27	1:00.71	25	Did not advance			
26	27	Leslie Stratton	Sweden	1:01.17	23	1:01.51	24	1:01.52	28	Did not advance			
27	22	Jaclyn Narracott	Australia	1:00.63	21	1:03.13	28	1:00.76	26	Did not advance			
28	28	Dārta Zunte	Latvia	1:02.24	27	1:01.61	25	1:00.95	27	Did not advance			
