= IBSF World Championships 2020 – Skeleton mixed team =

Skeleton mixed team at the IBSF World Championships 2020
- Venue: Altenberg bobsleigh, luge, and skeleton track
- Location: Altenberg, Germany
- Dates: 1 March
- Competitors: 30 from 9 nations
- Teams: 15
- Winning time: 1:55.39

Medalists
gold medal	Jacqueline Lölling; Alexander Gassner	Germany
silver medal	Jane Channell; Dave Greszczyszyn	Canada
bronze medal	Mattia Gaspari; Valentina Margaglio	Italy

The Skeleton mixed team competition at the IBSF World Championships 2020 was held on 1 March 2020.

== Results ==
The race was started at 10:04.

Rank	Bib	Country	Athletes	Time	Behind
1st place, gold medalist(s)	14	Germany	Jacqueline Lölling; Alexander Gassner	1:55.39	
2nd place, silver medalist(s)	5	Canada	Jane Channell; Dave Greszczyszyn	1:55.40	+0.01
3rd place, bronze medalist(s)	1	Italy	Valentina Margaglio; Mattia Gaspari	1:55.82	+0.43
4	3	Great Britain	Madelaine Smith; Matt Weston	1:55.95	+0.46
5	13	Germany	Tina Hermann; Christopher Grotheer	1:56.08	+0.69
6	4	China	Lin Huiyang; Yan Wengang	1:56.10	+0.71
7	7	United States	Kendall Wesenberg; Austin Florian	1:56.16	+0.77
8	8	Switzerland	Marina Gilardoni; Basil Sieber	1:56.20	+0.81
9	10	Russia	Yulia Kanakina; Nikita Tregubov	1:56.54	+1.15
10	9	Canada	Mirela Rahneva; Kevin Boyer	1:56.75	+1.36
11	11	Great Britain	Laura Deas; Marcus Wyatt	1:56.81	+1.42
12	15	Russia	Elena Nikitina; Aleksandr Tretyakov	1:56.83	+1.44
13	12	Austria	Janine Flock; Florian Auer	1:57.85	+2.46
14	2	Italy	Alessia Crippa; Amedeo Bagnis	1:58.26	+2.87
15	6	China	Zhu Yangqi; Geng Wenqiang	2:00.35	+4.96
