= IBSF World Championships 2024 – Women =

Women at the IBSF World Championships 2024
- Venue: Winterberg bobsleigh, luge, and skeleton track
- Location: Winterberg, Germany
- Dates: 22 February (run 1–2); 23 February (run 3–4)
- Competitors: 27 from 16 nations
- Winning time: 3:51.27

Medalists
gold medal	Hallie Clarke	Canada
silver medal	Kim Meylemans	Belgium
bronze medal	Hannah Neise	Germany

The Women competition at the IBSF World Championships 2024 was held on 22 and 23 February 2024.

== Results ==
The first two runs were started on 22 February at 10:04. The last two runs were held on 23 February at 10:04.

Rank	Bib	Athlete	Country	Run 1	Rank	Run 2	Rank	Run 3	Rank	Run 4	Rank	Total	Behind
1st place, gold medalist(s)	10	Hallie Clarke	Canada	58.20	2	58.97	10	57.17	2	56.93	1	3:51.27	
2nd place, silver medalist(s)	2	Kim Meylemans	Belgium	58.28	4	58.98	12	57.18	3	57.05	7	3:51.49	+0.22
3rd place, bronze medalist(s)	4	Hannah Neise	Germany	58.40	7	58.83	8	57.11	1	57.19	9	3:51.53	+0.26
4	11	Tabitha Stoecker	Great Britain	58.25	3	58.95	9	57.30	9	57.05	7	3:51.55	+0.28
5	8	Jacqueline Pfeifer	Germany	58.52	9	58.81	7	57.24	8	57.03	4	3:51.60	+0.33
6	13	Amelia Coltman	Great Britain	58.32	5	59.09	14	57.18	3	57.03	4	3:51.62	+0.35
7	6	Mirela Rahneva	Canada	58.34	6	59.09	14	57.23	7	56.97	2	3:51.63	+0.36
8	9	Mystique Ro	United States	58.42	8	59.05	13	57.21	5	56.97	2	3:51.65	+0.38
9	3	Kimberley Bos	Netherlands	58.18	1	59.35	21	57.21	5	57.03	4	3:51.77	+0.50
10	7	Susanne Kreher	Germany	58.61	11	58.70	2	57.62	11	57.48	11	3:52.41	+1.14
11	17	Jane Channell	Canada	58.91	13	58.47	1	57.82	14	57.52	12	3:52.72	+1.45
12	1	Janine Flock	Austria	58.56	10	59.29	20	57.61	10	57.29	10	3:52.75	+1.48
13	14	Nicole Silveira	Brazil	58.84	12	58.76	5	57.68	12	57.69	14	3:52.97	+1.70
14	12	Zhao Dan	China	59.06	15	58.70	2	57.75	13	57.56	13	3:53.07	+1.80
15	16	Alessia Crippa	Italy	59.67	19	58.80	6	58.13	16	57.89	16	3:54.49	+3.22
16	24	Aline Pelckmans	Belgium	59.83	22	58.97	10	58.23	17	57.93	17	3:54.96	+3.69
17	19	Anna Fernstädt	Czech Republic	59.39	16	59.14	17	58.49	20	58.00	18	3:55.02	+3.75
17	15	Li Yuxi	China	59.43	17	59.40	22	58.41	19	57.78	15	3:55.02	+3.75
19	21	Julia Erlacher	Austria	59.47	18	59.09	14	58.33	18	58.35	20	3:55.24	+3.97
20	18	Alessandra Fumagalli	Italy	59.69	20	59.15	18	58.73	21	58.31	19	3:55.88	+4.61
21	20	Sara Schmied	Switzerland	59.72	21	59.21	19	58.83	23	58.81	23	3:56.57	+5.30
22	25	Dārta Zunte	Latvia	1:00.36	23	59.52	23	58.94	24	58.36	21	3:57.18	+5.91
23	26	Katharina Eigenmann	Liechtenstein	1:00.75	24	59.72	24	58.82	22	58.68	22	3:57.97	+6.70
24	22	Julia Simmchen	Switzerland	1:00.80	25	59.72	24	59.23	25	58.95	24	3:58.70	+7.43
25	27	Laura Vargas	Colombia	1:01.78	27	1:02.02	26	1:00.47	27	Did not advance			
26	23	Ana Torres-Quevedo	Spain	1:01.52	26	1:02.90	27	1:00.12	26	Did not advance			
–	5	Valentina Margaglio	Italy	58.91	13	58.71	4	Did not start					
