= IBSF World Championships 2021 – Women =

Women at the IBSF World Championships 2021
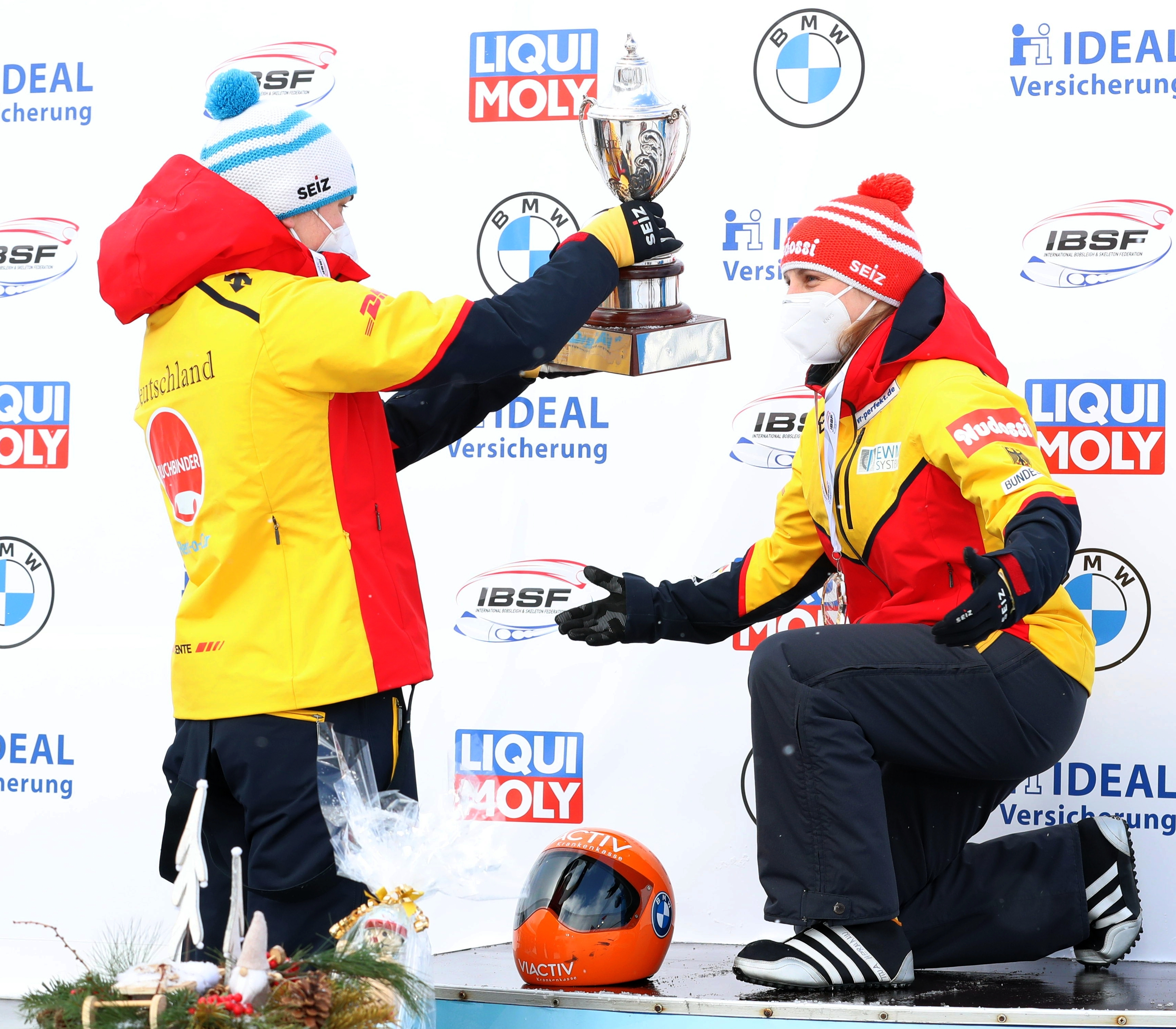
- Women's Skeleton Medal Ceremony (Bobsleigh & Skeleton World Championships Altenberg 2021)
- Venue: Altenberg bobsleigh, luge, and skeleton track
- Location: Altenberg, Germany
- Dates: 11–12 February
- Competitors: 24 from 13 nations
- Winning time: 3:52.97

Medalists
gold medal	Tina Hermann	Germany
silver medal	Jacqueline Lölling	Germany
bronze medal	Elena Nikitina

The Women competition at the IBSF World Championships 2021 was held on 11 and 12 February 2021.

== Results ==
The first two runs were started on 11 February at 09:04 and the last two runs on 12 February at 09:04.

Rank	Bib	Athlete	Country	Run 1	Rank	Run 2	Rank	Run 3	Rank	Run 4	Rank	Total	Behind
1st place, gold medalist(s)	5	Tina Hermann	Germany	58.96	11	58.02	1	57.96	1	58.03	1	3:52.97	
2nd place, silver medalist(s)	7	Jacqueline Lölling	Germany	58.39	2	58.35	2	58.03	2	58.31	2	3:53.08	+0.11
3rd place, bronze medalist(s)	8	Elena Nikitina	Bobsleigh Federation of Russia	58.32	1	58.53	3	59.03	16	58.77	9	3:54.65	+1.68
4	24	Sophia Griebel	Germany	58.80	5	58.92	7	58.42	4	58.53	3	3:54.67	+1.70
4	23	Alina Tararychenkova	Bobsleigh Federation of Russia	58.80	5	58.69	4	58.65	9	58.53	3	3:54.67	+1.70
6	3	Katie Uhlaender	United States	58.62	4	58.83	5	58.60	8	58.83	11	3:54.88	+1.91
7	11	Hannah Neise	Germany	58.52	3	59.34	15	58.35	3	58.70	7	3:54.91	+1.94
8	1	Jane Channell	Canada	58.86	7	58.96	8	58.48	5	58.65	6	3:54.95	+1.98
9	9	Kim Meylemans	Belgium	59.12	13	58.97	9	58.75	10	58.81	10	3:55.65	+2.68
10	10	Anna Fernstädtová	Czech Republic	58.90	9	58.89	6	58.76	11	59.12	14	3:55.67	+2.70
11	6	Kimberley Bos	Netherlands	59.10	12	59.62	18	58.55	6	58.61	5	3:55.88	+2.91
12	13	Valentina Margaglio	Italy	58.91	10	59.08	10	58.77	12	59.17	16	3:55.93	+2.96
13	15	Yulia Kanakina	Bobsleigh Federation of Russia	58.87	8	59.33	14	59.01	15	59.16	15	3:56.37	+3.40
14	18	Ashleigh Fay Pittaway	Great Britain	59.12	13	59.12	11	59.00	14	59.21	18	3:56.45	+3.48
15	12	Laura Deas	Great Britain	1:00.00	20	59.45	16	58.58	7	58.73	8	3:56.76	+3.79
16	4	Janine Flock	Austria	59.72	17	59.27	12	58.97	13	59.08	12	3:57.04	+4.07
17	22	Nicole Rocha Silveira	Brazil	1:00.08	21	59.28	13	59.19	19	59.18	17	3:57.73	+4.76
18	14	Elisabeth Maier	Canada	59.77	18	59.91	21	59.08	18	59.10	13	3:57.86	+4.89
19	21	Kendall Wesenberg	United States	59.46	15	59.89	20	59.07	17	59.46	19	3:57.88	+4.91
20	16	Endija Tērauda	Latvia	59.98	19	59.85	19	59.41	20	59.75	20	3:58.99	+6.02
21	20	Agathe Bessard	France	1:00.09	22	59.60	17	59.72	23	Did not advance			
22	17	Alessia Crippa	Italy	59.50	16	1:00.39	24	59.65	21	Did not advance			
23	19	Brogan Crowley	Great Britain	1:00.27	23	1:00.20	22	59.70	22	Did not advance			
24	2	Sara Roderick	United States	1:00.77	24	1:00.36	23	1:00.09	24	Did not advance			
