= IBSF World Championships 2021 – Skeleton mixed team =

Skeleton mixed team at the IBSF World Championships 2021
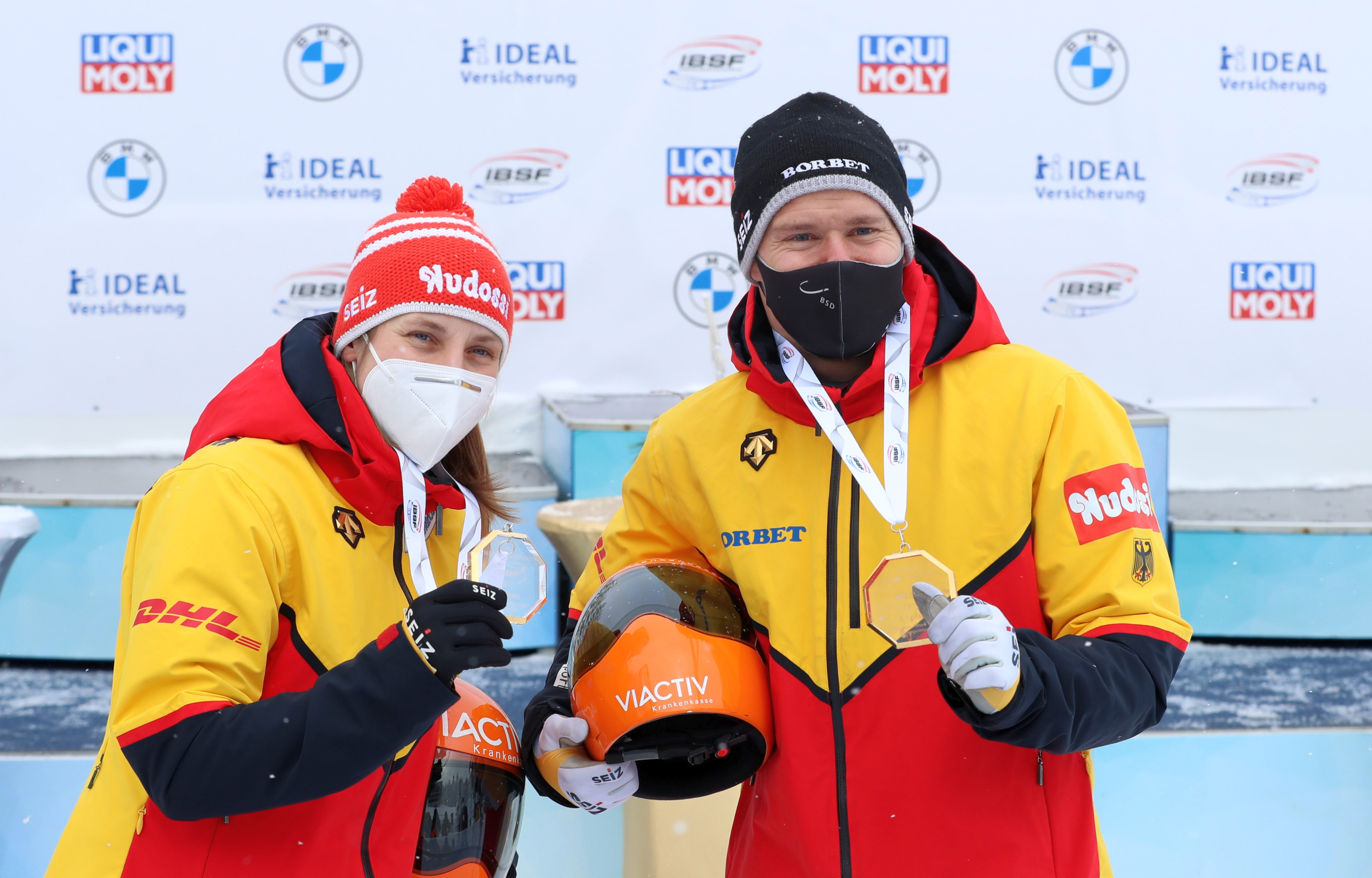
- Skeleton Mixed Team Medal Ceremony (Bobsleigh & Skeleton World Championships Altenberg 2021) by Sandro Halank
- Venue: Altenberg bobsleigh, luge, and skeleton track
- Location: Altenberg, Germany
- Date: 13 February
- Competitors: 22 from 7 nations
- Teams: 11
- Winning time: 1:55.41

Medalists
| gold medal | Tina Hermann; Christopher Grotheer | Germany |
| silver medal | Jacqueline Lölling; Alexander Gassner | Germany |
| bronze medal | Elena Nikitina; Alexander Tretiakov |

The Skeleton mixed team competition at the IBSF World Championships 2021 was held on 13 February 2021.

== Results ==
The race was started at 09:04.

| Rank | Bib | Country | Athletes | Time | Behind |
|---|---|---|---|---|---|
| 1st place, gold medalist(s) | 11 | Germany 1 | Tina Hermann; Christopher Grotheer | 1:55.41 | |
| 2nd place, silver medalist(s) | 12 | Germany 2 | Jacqueline Lölling; Alexander Gassner | 1:55.55 | +0.14 |
| 3rd place, bronze medalist(s) | 9 | Bobsleigh Federation of Russia 1 | Elena Nikitina; Alexander Tretiakov | 1:55.56 | +0.15 |
| 4 | 8 | Great Britain 1 | Laura Deas; Matt Weston | 1:55.98 | +0.57 |
| 5 | 2 | Bobsleigh Federation of Russia 2 | Alina Tararychenkova; Evgeniy Rukosuev | 1:56.21 | +0.80 |
| 6 | 10 | Austria | Janine Flock; Florian Auer | 1:56.99 | +1.58 |
| 7 | 7 | Great Britain 2 | Ashleigh Pittaway; Marcus Wyatt | 1:57.09 | +1.68 |
| 8 | 5 | Italy 1 | Valentina Margaglio; Amedeo Bagnis | 1:57.19 | +1.78 |
| 9 | 6 | Italy 2 | Alessia Crippa; Mattia Gaspari | 1:57.29 | +1.88 |
| 10 | 1 | Canada 2 | Elisabeth Maier; Kyle Murray | 1:58.48 | +3.07 |
| 11 | 4 | Belgium | Kim Meylemans; Colin Freeling | 1:59.62 | +4.21 |
| | 3 | Canada 1 | Jane Channell; Mark Lynch | Did not start | |
