= IBSF World Championships 2025 – Skeleton mixed team =

Skeleton mixed team at the IBSF World Championships 2025
- Venue: Mt. Van Hoevenberg Olympic Bobsled Run
- Location: Lake Placid, United States
- Dates: 8 March
- Competitors: 34 from 10 nations
- Teams: 17
- Winning time: 1:54.53

Medalists
gold medal	Mystique Ro; Austin Florian	United States
silver medal	Tabitha Stoecker; Matt Weston	Great Britain
bronze medal	Zhao Dan; Lin Qinwei	China

The Skeleton mixed team competition at the IBSF World Championships 2025 was held on 8 March 2025.

== Results ==
The race was started at 19:05.

Rank	Bib	Country	Athletes	Time	Behind
1st place, gold medalist(s)	11	United States 1	Mystique Ro; Austin Florian	1:54.53	
2nd place, silver medalist(s)	14	Great Britain 1	Tabitha Stoecker; Matt Weston	1:54.63	+0.10
3rd place, bronze medalist(s)	12	China 2	Zhao Dan; Lin Qinwei	1:54.81	+0.28
4	16	Germany 2	Jacqueline Pfeifer; Christopher Grotheer	1:54.94	+0.41
5	9	Italy 2	Valentina Margaglio; Mattia Gaspari	1:55.16	+0.63
5	13	Germany 1	Susanne Kreher; Axel Jungk	1:55.16	+0.63
7	8	Italy 1	Alessia Crippa; Amedeo Bagnis	1:55.35	+0.82
8	10	China 1	Li Yuxi; Chen Wenhao	1:55.36	+0.83
9	17	Austria 1	Janine Flock; Samuel Maier	1:55.37	+0.84
10	5	United States 2	Kelly Curtis; Daniel Barefoot	1:56.10	+1.57
11	7	Austria 2	Julia Erlacher; Alexander Schlintner	1:56.45	+1.92
12	6	Czech Republic	Anna Fernstädt; Timon Drahoňovský	1:56.92	+2.39
13	1	Spain	Clara Aznar; Adrían Rodríguez	1:57.35	+2.82
14	3	Switzerland 2	Sara Schmied; Livio Summermatter	1:57.55	+3.02
15	4	Switzerland 1	Julia Simmchen; Vinzenz Buff	1:57.84	+3.31
16	2	Belgium	Aline Pelckmans; Colin Freeling	1:58.69	+4.16
	15	Great Britain 2	Amelia Coltman; Marcus Wyatt	Disqualified	
