= Skeleton at the 2022 Winter Olympics – Men's =

Skeleton men's at the XXIV Olympic Winter Games
- Skeleton
- Venue: Xiaohaituo Bobsleigh and Luge Track; Beijing
- Date: 10, 11 February 2022
- Competitors: 25 from 15 nations
- Winning time: 4:01.01

Medalists
1st place, gold medalist(s)		Christopher Grotheer	Germany
2nd place, silver medalist(s)		Axel Jungk	Germany
3rd place, bronze medalist(s)		Yan Wengang	China

The men's competition in skeleton at the 2022 Winter Olympics was held on 10 February (runs 1 and 2) and 11 February (runs 3 and 4), at the Xiaohaituo Bobsleigh and Luge Track in Yanqing District of Beijing. Christopher Grotheer of Germany won the event, with Axel Jungk, also of Germany, being the silver medalist, and Yan Wengang of China the bronze medalist. For each of them, these were their first Olympic medals.

== Background ==
The defending champion was Yun Sung-bin. The silver medalist from 2018, Nikita Tregubov, qualified for the Olympics but was not allowed to take a flight to China due to a positive COVID-19 test and had to miss the Olympics. The bronze medalist, Dom Parsons, retired from competitions in 2019. Grotheer was the 2021 World champion. Alexander Tretyakov, who was also the 2014 Olympic champion, and Alexander Gassner were the silver and bronze medalists, respectively. Martins Dukurs won the 2021–22 Skeleton World Cup, followed by Jungk and Grotheer.

Grotheer won the first two runs, setting the track record in the first one. After the first day, Jungk was 0.7 seconds behind him, closely followed by Yan Wengang and Tratyakov. He won the third run as well, but was only the sixth in the last run, still sufficient for gold. Tretyakov was in the bronze position before the last run, but then Yan was the fastest in the last run and won the bronze medal.

== Qualification ==
A total of 25 quota spots were available to athletes to compete at the games. A maximum of three athletes could be entered by a NOC.

The World Ranking list as of January 16, 2022 will be used to distribute the quotas. Athletes will be ranked by their best seven results. At total of two countries in each gender will qualify the maximum of three athletes, while six countries will qualify two athletes and seven countries will qualify one quota. If the host nation China fails to qualify in an event, the highest ranked sled from the country will take the last qualification slot. An athlete has to be ranked within the top 60 to be eligible to compete at the games.

== Results ==
Rank	Bib	Athlete	Country	Run 1	Rank 1	Run 2	Rank 2	Run 3	Rank 3	Run 4	Rank 4	Total	Behind
1st place, gold medalist(s)	4	Christopher Grotheer	Germany	1:00.00 TR	1	1:00.33	1	1:00.16	1	1:00.52	6	4:01.01	–
2nd place, silver medalist(s)	8	Axel Jungk	Germany	1:00.50	5	1:00.53	2	1:00.31	2	1:00.33	3	4:01.67	+0.66
3rd place, bronze medalist(s)	18	Yan Wengang	China	1:00.43	3	1:00.65	4	1:00.54	6	1:00.15	1	4:01.77	+0.76
4	5	Aleksandr Tretyakov	ROC	1:00.36	2	1:00.84	8	1:00.37	3	1:00.42	4	4:01.99	+0.98
5	21	Yin Zheng	China	1:00.74	7	1:00.71	5	1:00.40	4	1:00.28	2	4:02.13	+1.12
6	12	Evgeniy Rukosuev	ROC	1:00.48	4	1:00.72	6	1:00.56	7	1:00.64	8	4:02.40	+1.39
7	7	Martins Dukurs	Latvia	1:00.62	6	1:00.62	3	1:00.40	4	1:01.12	13	4:02.76	+1.75
8	13	Alexander Gassner	Germany	1:00.87	9	1:00.86	9	1:00.62	8	1:00.48	5	4:02.83	+1.82
9	6	Tomass Dukurs	Latvia	1:00.76	8	1:00.79	7	1:00.74	10	1:00.92	10	4:03.21	+2.20
10	10	Jung Seung-gi	South Korea	1:01.18	11	1:01.04	10	1:00.69	9	1:00.83	9	4:03.74	+2.73
11	16	Amedeo Bagnis	Italy	1:01.05	10	1:01.19	14	1:00.83	11	1:01.01	12	4:04.08	+3.07
12	11	Yun Sung-bin	South Korea	1:01.26	12	1:01.17	13	1:01.03	12	1:00.63	7	4:04.09	+3.08
13	14	Samuel Maier	Austria	1:01.36	15	1:01.13	11	1:01.05	13	1:00.95	11	4:04.49	+3.48
14	17	Mattia Gaspari	Italy	1:01.20	12	1:01.31	15	1:01.16	15	1:01.36	16	4:05.03	+4.02
15	9	Matt Weston	Great Britain	1:01.34	14	1:01.15	12	1:01.12	14	1:01.63	20	4:05.24	+4.23
16	19	Marcus Wyatt	Great Britain	1:01.56	16	1:01.72	18	1:01.28	16	1:01.35	15	4:05.91	+4.90
17	20	Alexander Schlintner	Austria	1:01.56	16	1:01.73	19	1:01.66	19	1:01.24	14	4:06.19	+5.18
18	15	Vladyslav Heraskevych	Ukraine	1:01.63	18	1:01.58	16	1:01.62	18	1:01.45	17	4:06.28	+5.27
19	22	Nathan Crumpton	American Samoa	1:02.06	22	1:01.65	17	1:01.60	17	1:01.49	18	4:06.80	+5.79
20	24	Blake Enzie	Canada	1:01.65	19	1:01.76	20	1:01.93	21	1:01.54	19	4:06.88	+5.87
21	2	Andrew Blaser	United States	1:01.80	20	1:02.08	21	1:02.10	22	—N/a		3:05.98	—N/a
22	25	Basil Sieber	Switzerland	1:01.95	21	1:02.16	22	1:02.72	25	—N/a		3:06.83	—N/a
23	3	Daniil Romanov	ROC	1:02.47	24	1:02.60	23	1:02.20	23	—N/a		3:07.27	—N/a
24	1	Ander Mirambell	Spain	1:02.45	23	1:03.36	25	1:02.34	24	—N/a		3:08.15	—N/a
25	23	Nick Timmings	Australia	1:03.76	25	1:02.83	24	1:01.78	20	—N/a		3:08.37	—N/a
