= Lin Qinwei =

Chinese skeleton racer (born 1999)

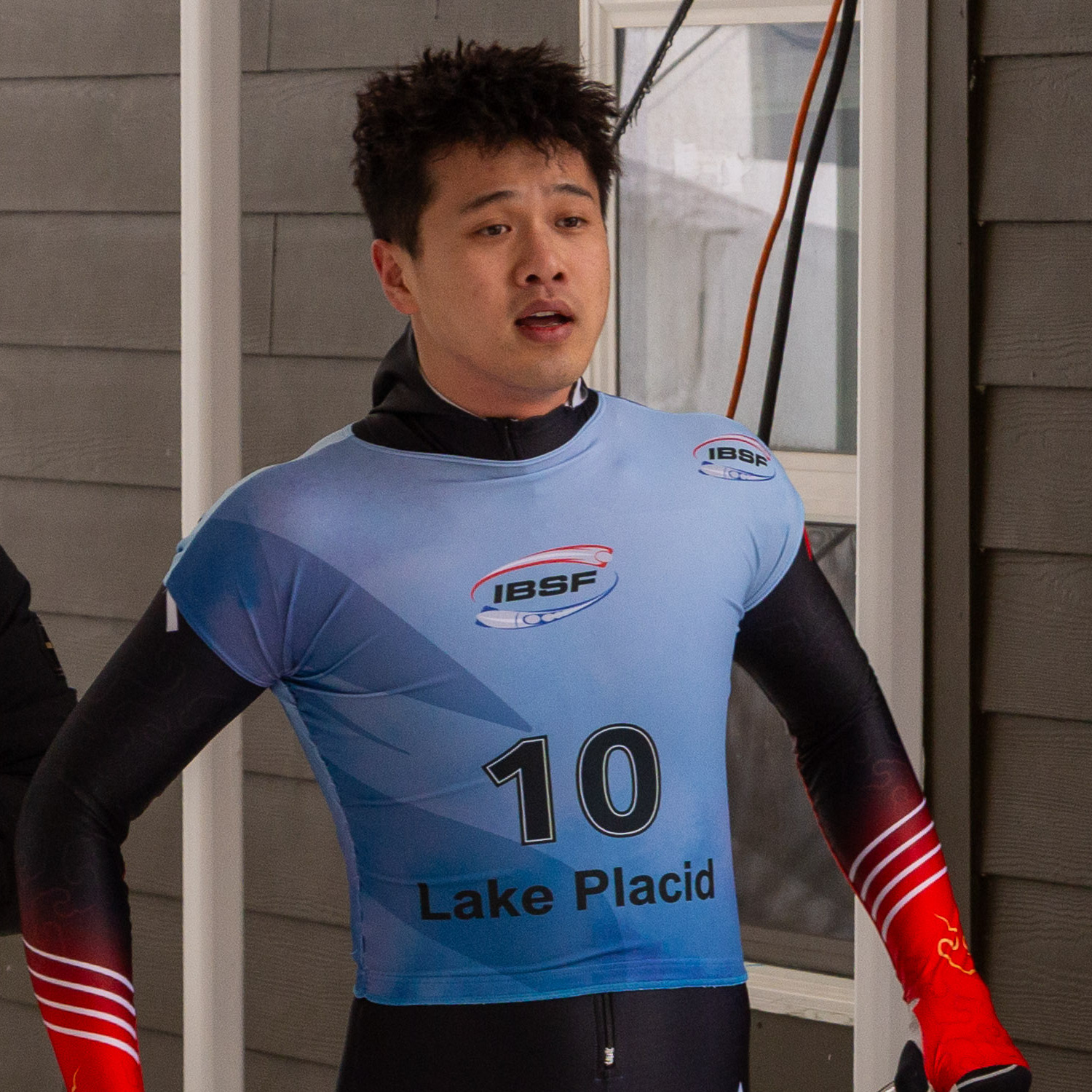
- Lin in 2025

Personal information
- Born: 7 November 1999 (age 26)
- Height: 1.88 m (6 ft 2 in)
- Weight: 86 kg (190 lb)

Sport
- Country: China
- Sport: Skeleton
Medal record
Men's skeleton
Representing China
World Championships
Bronze medal – third place	2025 Lake Placid	Mixed team

Lin Qinwei (born 7 November 1999) is a Chinese skeleton racer.

== Career ==
During the 2024–25 Skeleton World Cup, Lin won the second mixed team race of the season on 3 January 2025, along with Zhao Dan He earned his first career World Cup victory on 7 February 2025, with a time of 1:42.69. In March 2025, he competed at the IBSF World Championships 2025 and won a bronze medal in the mixed team event, along with Zhao, with a time of 1:54.81. This was China's first World Championships medal in the new Olympic discipline of mixed skeleton.
