= Margaglio =

Margaglio is an Italian surname. Notable people with the surname include:

- Maurizio Margaglio (born 1974), Italian ice dancing competitor
- Valentina Margaglio (born 1993), Italian skeleton racer
