= Gruppo Sportivo Fiamme Azzurre =

Sport section of the Polizia Penitenziaria of Italy

- Sport: 19 disciplines
- Jurisdiction: Italy
- Abbreviation: G.S. Fiamme Azzurre
- Founded: 1983
- Affiliation: CONI
- Headquarters: Rome

Official website
- www.polizia-penitenziaria.it

The Gruppo Sportivo Fiamme Azzurre is the sport section of the Italian police force Polizia Penitenziaria.

== History ==
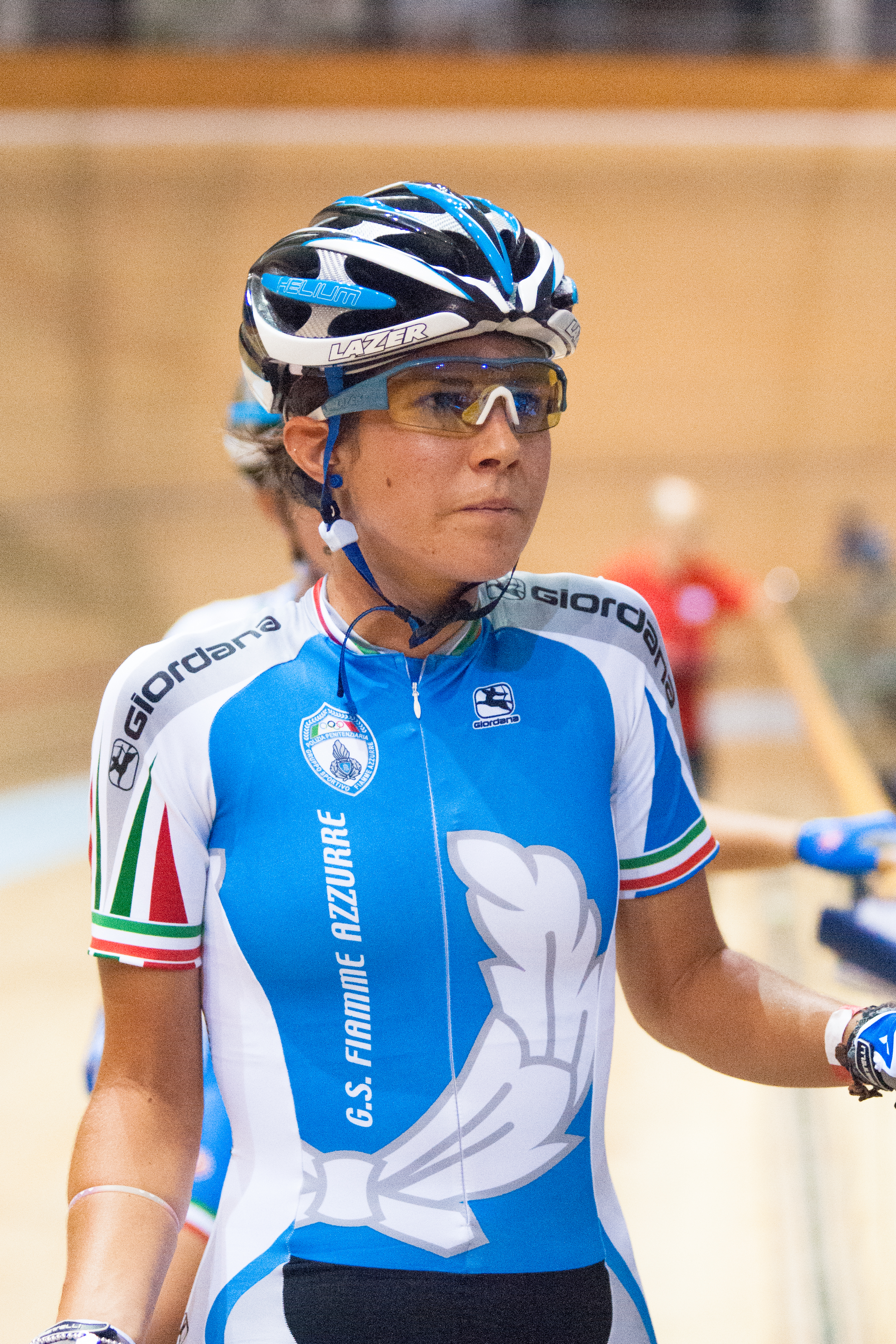
The cyclist Elena Cecchini with the Fiamme Azzurre jersey.

The first participation at the Summer Olympic Games was in Seoul 1988 while the one at the Winter Olympic Games was Turin 2006.

== Sports ==
The athletes of the G.S. Fiamme Azzurre are involved in 19 disciplines.

Summer sports	Winter sports	Not Olympic
Athletics	Alpine skiing	Roller skating
Sailing	Figure skating	
Cycling
Judo
Boxing
Wrestling
Swimming
Fencing
Weightlifting
Modern pentathlon
Equestrian
Taekwondo
Archery
Shooting
Tennis
Canoeing

== 2016 Olympic Games ==
There were 19 athletes from the Fiamme Azzurre who participated in the Rio 2016 Olympic Games. The only medal was won by Captain of the Fiamme azzurre team, the shooter Giovanni Pellielo, already in his fourth Olympic medal.

- Archery: Claudia Mandia
- Athletics: Eleonora Giorgi, Anna Incerti
- Boxing: Vincenzo Mangiacapre, Clemente Russo
- Cyclism: Elena Cecchini, Tatiana Guderzo, Simona Frapporti
- Fencing: Aldo Montano
- Modern pentathlon: Claudia Cesarini
- Sailing: Vittorio Bissaro, Silvia Sicouri, Mattia Camboni
- Shooting: Giovanni Pellielo
- Swimming: Michele Santucci, Ilaria Bianchi
- Triathlon: Davide Uccellari, Charlotte Bonin
- Weightlifting: Giorgia Bordignon

== Best results ==
The first Olympic podium was achieved in Barcelona 1992.

Competition	Athlete	Event	Medal
Olympic Games
Barcelona 1992	Roberto Bomprezzi	Modern pentathlon - Team	Bronze
Sydney 2000	Giovanni Pellielo	Shooting - Trap	Bronze
Athens 2004	Giovanni Pellielo	Shooting - Trap	Silver
Beijing 2008	Giovanni Pellielo	Shooting - Trap	Silver
Rio de Janeiro 2016	Giovanni Pellielo	Shooting - Trap	Silver
Beijing 2008	Tatiana Guderzo	Cycling - Road race	Bronze
London 2012	Clemente Russo	Boxing - Heavyweight	Silver
London 2012	Vincenzo Mangiacapre	Boxing - Welterweight	Bronze
London 2012	Aldo Montano	Fencing - Sabre team	Silver

== Other notable athletes ==
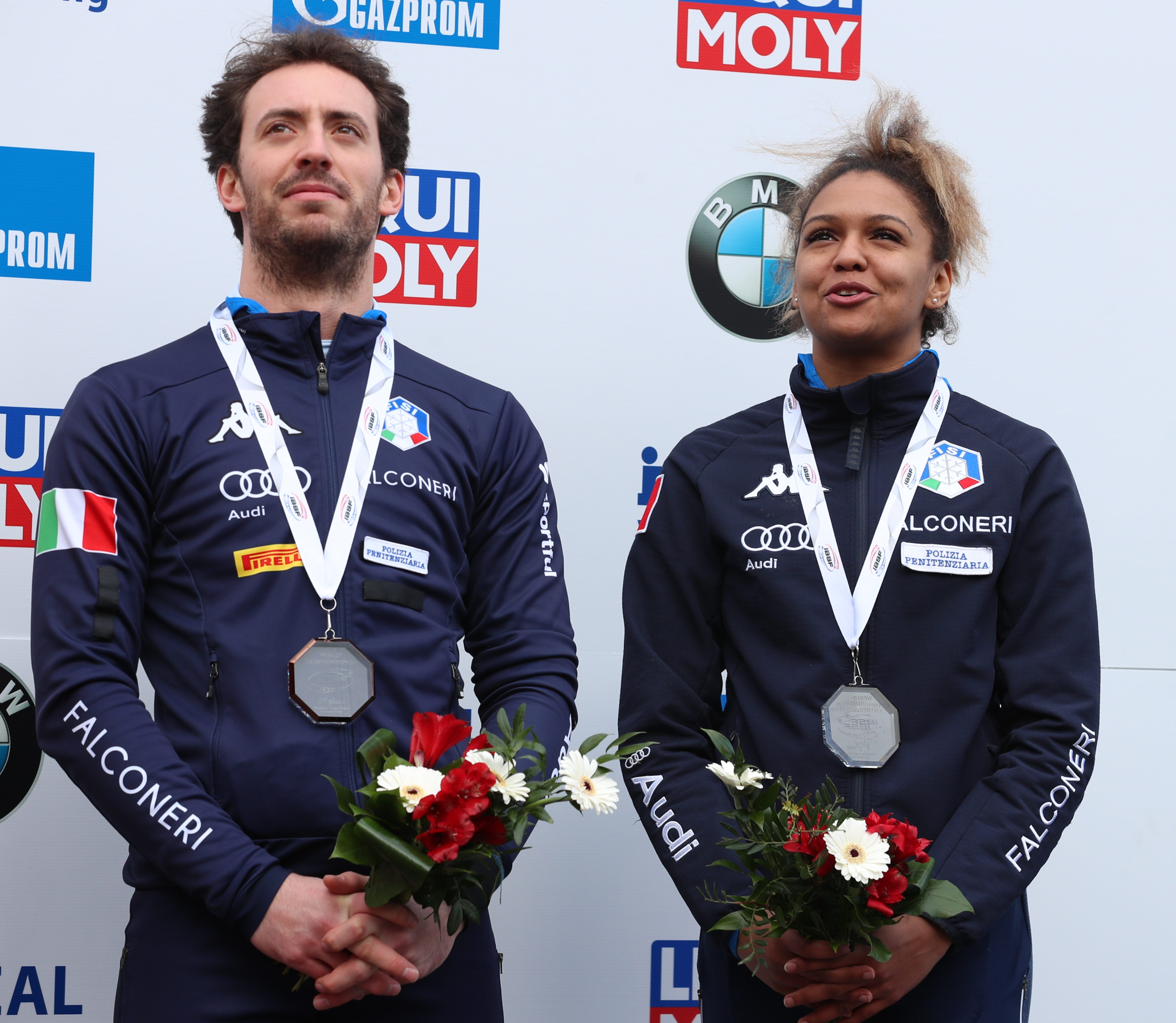
Mattia Gaspari and Valentina Margaglio, winners in 2020 of the historic first all-time medal at the Skeleton World Championships for Italy.

- Athletics: Paolo Camossi, Giuseppe D'Urso, Rossella Giordano, Andrea Benvenuti, Nicola Vizzoni
- Cycling: Marta Bastianelli
- Figure skating: Carolina Kostner and Matteo Rizzo
- Skeleton: Mattia Gaspari and Valentina Margaglio (bronze medal in mixed at the IBSF World Championships 2020)

== See also ==
- Polizia Penitenziaria
- Italian military sports bodies
- European Champion Clubs Cup (athletics)
