= Andrew Blaser =

American skeleton racer (born 1989)

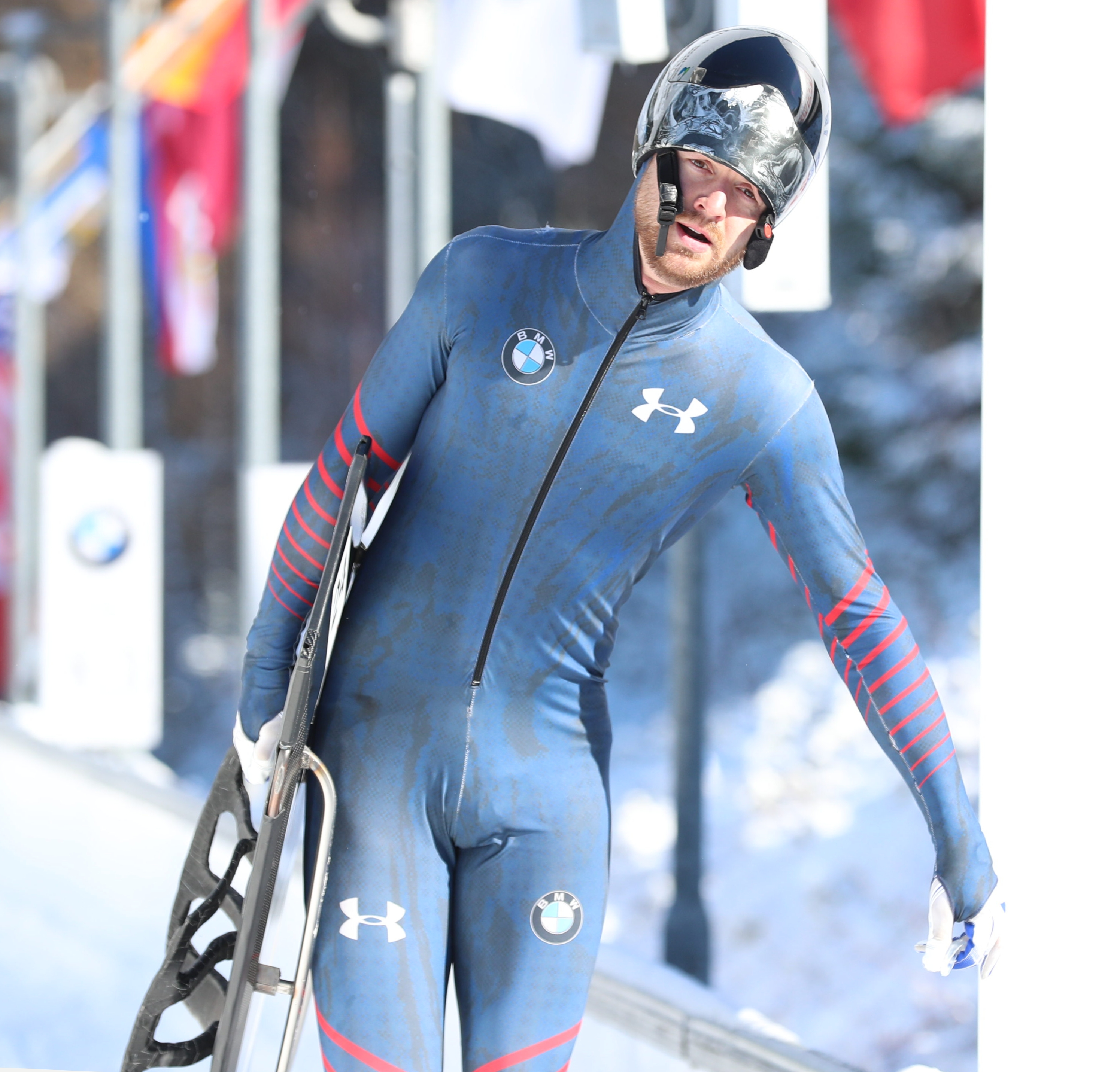

Personal information
- Born: 8 May 1989 (age 37) Boise, Idaho, U.S.
- Height: 6 ft 4 in (193 cm)
- Weight: 189 lb (86 kg)

Sport
- Country: United States
- Sport: Skeleton

Andrew Joseph Blaser (born May 8, 1989) is an American skeleton racer who competed at the 2022 Winter Olympics. He was previously a collegiate track and field athlete at Louisville and Idaho.

== Early years ==
Blaser was born on May 8, 1989, in Boise, Idaho to Sherman and Ellen Blaser. He was the youngest of four children in an athletic Mormon family, and danced ballet in elementary school. He attended Meridian High School in nearby Meridian, graduating in 2007. In addition to playing football and basketball, he was a three-time Class 5A state champion in track and field, winning back-to-back state titles in the 110m hurdles and tying for first in the 300m intermediate hurdles as a senior. He also won five district titles and set a school record in the 110m hurdles.

== College track career ==
Blaser attended the University of Louisville as a freshman, setting a school record in the heptathlon. He was planning to transfer to a junior college ahead of his sophomore year, but a friend of his convinced him to come to the University of Idaho instead, where he walked on to the track team and trained under sprint coach Angela Whyte. Blaser went on the win six individual conference titles for the Vandals. He was also honored with 10 outdoor All-Western Athletic Conference (WAC) honors and seven indoor All-WAC honors, both school records.

At the 2010 WAC Indoor Championships, Blaser earned first-team all-WAC honors in the high jump after recording a career-best mark of 6 ft 6¾ in. He was also a second-team all-WAC selection in three other events. He suffered a back injury in a car accident soon afterward, causing him to miss the 2010 outdoor and 2011 indoor seasons after undergoing hernia surgery. Blaser made his return to competition during the 2011 outdoor season. He won his first conference title at the WAC Championships, scoring a career-high 7,037 points in the decathlon to take first place. He set personal bests in six of the ten events en route to the fifth-best score in school history. He also won the 110m hurdles event at the Sam Adams Classic and the Payton Jordan Cardinal Invitational, qualifying for the NCAA Preliminaries for the first time in his career.

As a senior in 2012, he led the Vandals to a conference title at the WAC Indoor Championships, where he scored a school-record 40 points and won the heptathlon, high jump, and 60-meter hurdles. His score in the heptathlon (5,324) was the second-best mark in school history. It was the school's first WAC title in any men's sport, and Blaser was named the WAC Men's Field Performer of the Year for his performance. At the WAC Outdoor Championships, he set another school record with 44 points, winning the decathlon and 110 hurdles events while finishing third in four others. He won seven of the ten events in the decathlon. He also qualified for the NCAA Preliminaries in the 110m hurdles for the second year in a row. At the end of the year Blaser was given the Joe Kearney Award as the conference's top male student-athlete, which he shared with Utah football player Robert Turpin.

== Skeleton career ==
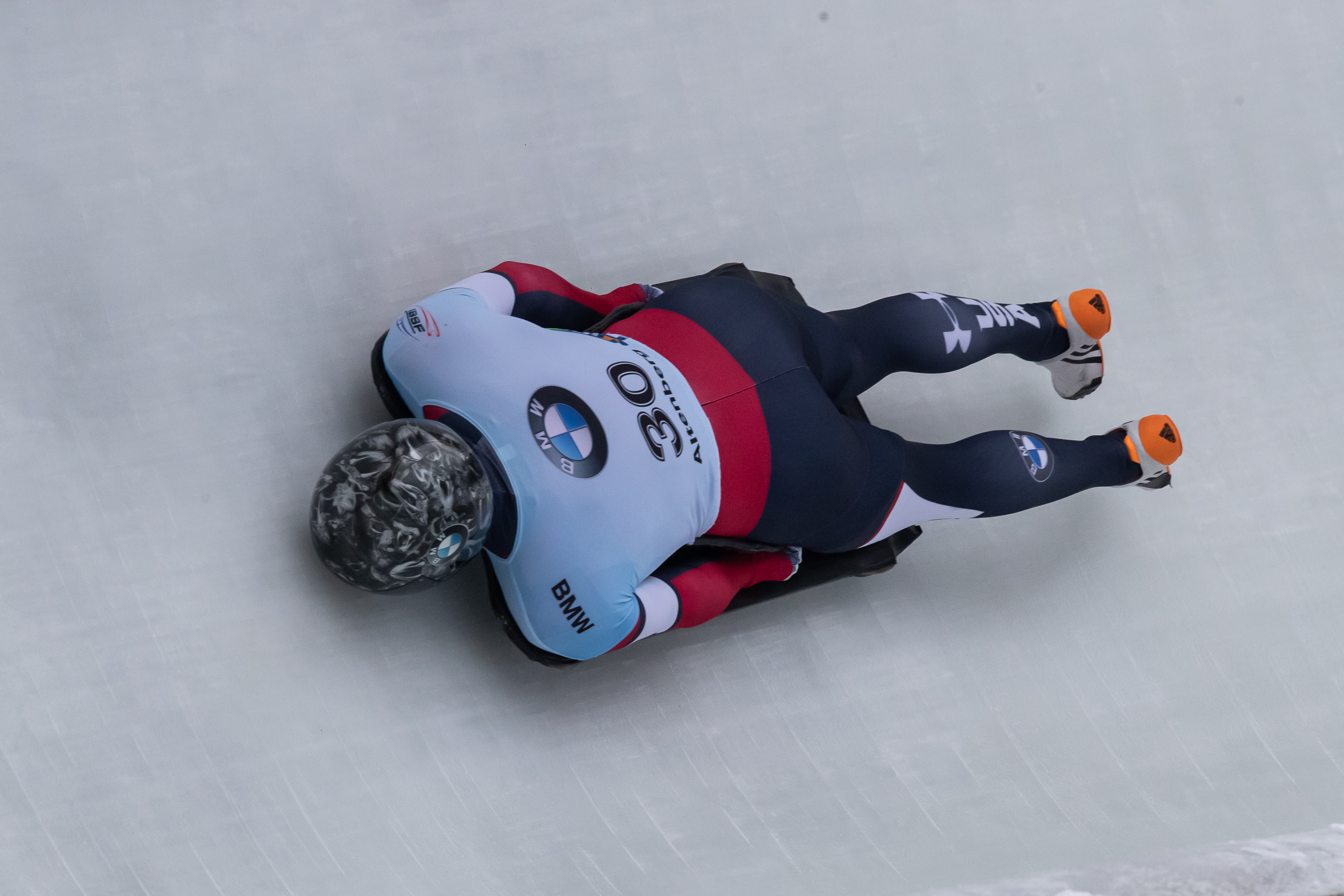
Blaser at the 2020 Skeleton World Championships

Blaser spent his first year after college as an assistant coach on the Utah State track team. While watching Cool Runnings, Blaser joked with his sister that he should try bobsledding. He first called coaches in the spring of 2012 and attended a combine in Park City, Utah, but he was advised to switch to the similar sport of skeleton because of his lighter frame. He made the move but soon grew frustrated and moved to Louisville, where he knew some people. After eight months, he decided to give skeleton another chance, so he drove back to Utah, got a job as a waiter, and bought a new sled.

Blaser debuted on the international circuit during the 2015–16 North American Cup season. He won his first medal, a silver, at a race in Park City in March 2016, finishing .07 seconds behind first place. In 2017–18 he earned six medals (one silver and five bronze). The following season, he won four gold medals in the North American Cup: two each in Park City and Lake Placid. At the 2019 USA Skeleton National Team Trials, Blaser won all four races to win a spot on the 2019–20 Skeleton World Cup roster. He finished 23rd and 22nd (out of 27) in his first two races, respectively. Blaser placed 27th at the 2020 World Championships, suffering a concussion when he crashed.

Blaser finished 2021 as the 28th-ranked racer in the IBSF standings and as the highest American earned a spot in the 2022 Winter Olympics in Beijing. In January 2022, he was officially announced as a member of the American skeleton team at the Tokyo Games, marking the first time the U.S. delegation included a single male skeleton rider. He finished in 21st place after three heats and missed the finals.

== Personal life ==
Blaser lives in Boise during the offseason, where he serves as an assistant coach for volleyball and track at Capital High School. He also works through the Starbucks Elite Athlete Program.

Blaser is openly gay. He came out to his family around 2014 or 2015, though he had been out among his friends for years. In high school, he spent his lunches "with the theater kids instead of the athletes he competed with" and faced homophobic taunts from his peers. He first talked to the media about his sexuality in a November 2021 interview with Outsports. He was the first publicly gay man to compete in skeleton at the Olympic level, competing with a rainbow saddle on his sled. In the days leading up to the competition, he received a shoutout on Instagram from his favorite singer, Sara Bareilles.

His brother, Sherm, won a state title as head football coach at Kuna High School in Kuna, Idaho.
