= Dave Greszczyszyn =

Canadian skeleton racer

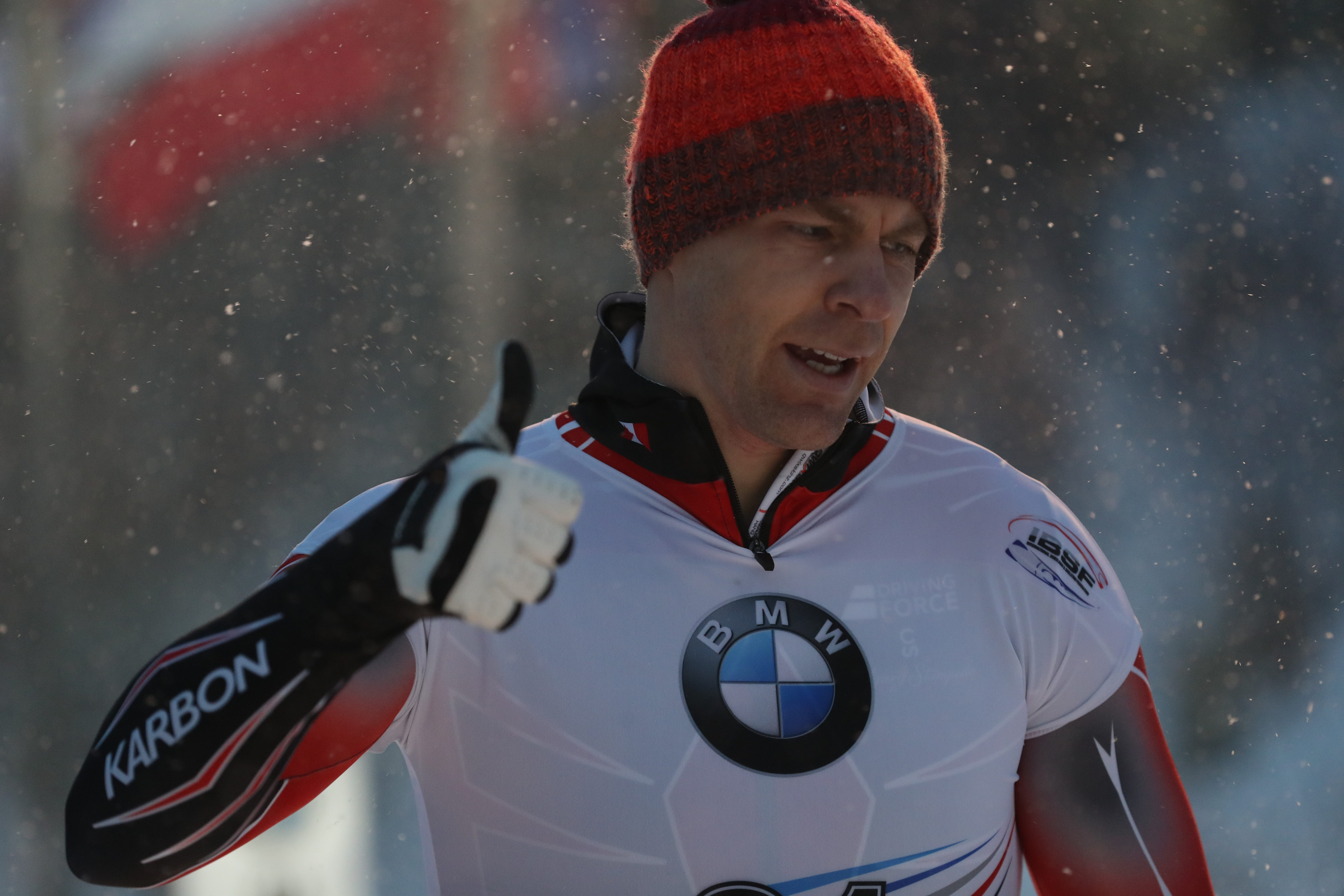

Personal information
- Born: September 18, 1979 (age 46) Brampton, Ontario, Canada
- Height: 1.90 m (6 ft 3 in)
- Weight: 95 kg (209 lb)

Sport
- Country: Canada
- Sport: Skeleton
- Turned pro: 2007
Medal record
World Championships
Silver medal – second place	2019 Whistler	Mixed team
Silver medal – second place	2020 Altenberg	Mixed skeleton
Bronze medal – third place	2015 Winterberg	Mixed team

Dave Greszczyszyn (born September 18, 1979) is a Canadian skeleton racer who has competed since 2007. Greszczyszyn is a two-time Canadian national champion, had four top-10 finishes in the 2014–15 Skeleton World Cup, and finished 11th at the 2015 FIBT World Championships. He also won five races in the Skeleton-Europacup.

== Career ==
In 2008, Greszczyszyn earned a spot on the North American Cup Circuit and moved to Calgary to train full-time. After competing for three years in North America, he earned a spot on the Europa Cup team and finished second overall. The 2012–13 season was his first year on the Canadian national team; he finished third overall on the Intercontinental Cup circuit. He earned a spot on the World Cup squad in 2013 and now is a high school teacher in Calgary. Dave is now a physical education teacher at North Trail High School in Calgary, Alberta which opened in 2023.

== Personal life ==
Dave was originally from Brampton. He played rugby at Brock University, and obtained a Masters of Teaching degree in Australia. Dave was a full-time teacher at Mayfield Secondary School in Caledon, Ontario until deciding to pursue skeleton full-time.
