= Lelde Priedulēna =

Latvian skeleton racer (born 1993)

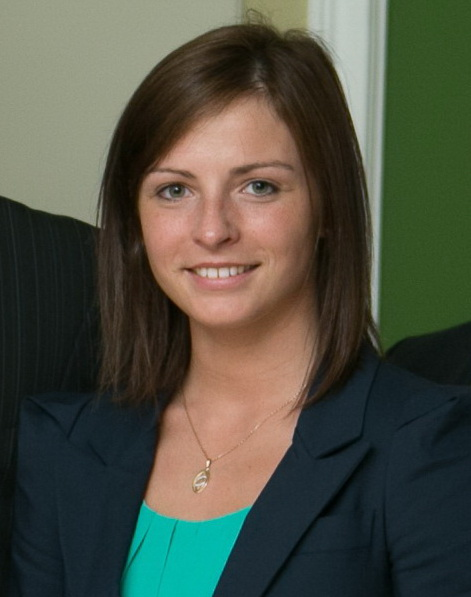
- Priedulēna in 2014

Personal information
- Nationality: Latvian
- Born: 20 July 1993 (age 32) Sigulda, Latvia
- Years active: 2010-2019
- Height: 163 cm (5 ft 4 in)
- Weight: 57 kg (126 lb)

Sport
- Country: Latvia
- Sport: skeleton
- Coached by: Dainis Dukurs

Achievements and titles
- Olympic finals: 7th (Pyeongchang 2018)
Medal record
Junior World Championships
Gold medal – first place	2016 Winterberg	Women

Lelde Priedulēna (born 20 July 1993, in Sigulda) is a Latvian former skeleton racer, and was the 2016 Junior World Champion in the sport. She participated at the 2014 Winter Olympics in Sochi. Before starting skeleton racing, Priedulēna was a track and field athlete, competing in the 60, 100, and 200 metre sprint events. Like other Latvian skeletoners, she is coached by sled-builder and former Latvian bobsleigh driver Dainis Dukurs, and rides a Dukurs-built sled. She began international competition in 2010 on the Europe Cup circuit, but recorded only five starts during two seasons before being elevated to the Intercontinental Cup and World Cup tours. In the summer of 2017, she tore a cruciate ligament during training, but elected to forgo surgery and continue training in preparation for the 2018 Winter Olympics. In February 2019 Priedulēna announced end of her professional career due to the injuries.

== Notable results ==
Priedulēna's first race in international competition was during the 2010–11 Europe Cup season at Igls, but she did not record a finish because her sled flipped and went down the track without her. She finished a total of four races in two seasons on the Europe Cup, recording one fourteenth-place finish at Königssee before being elevated to the Intercontinental Cup. Her first World Cup race was at Altenberg in 2011–12, where she finished 22nd. She split her time between the ICC and the World Cup until 2016. On the World Cup, her best finish has been 4th, most recently in 2017 at Whistler. She finished the 2016–17 World Cup overall rankings in 7th place.

Priedulēna competed in the Junior Worlds from 2012 until 2016, her last year of eligibility, in which she took gold. She represented Latvia at the 2014 Winter Olympics in Sochi, finishing 14th, and in the Senior World Championships from 2013 to 2017, finishing 7th at Königssee in 2017. In European Championships her best finish was 6th, at Igls in 2017.
