= Yan Wengang =

Chinese skeleton racer

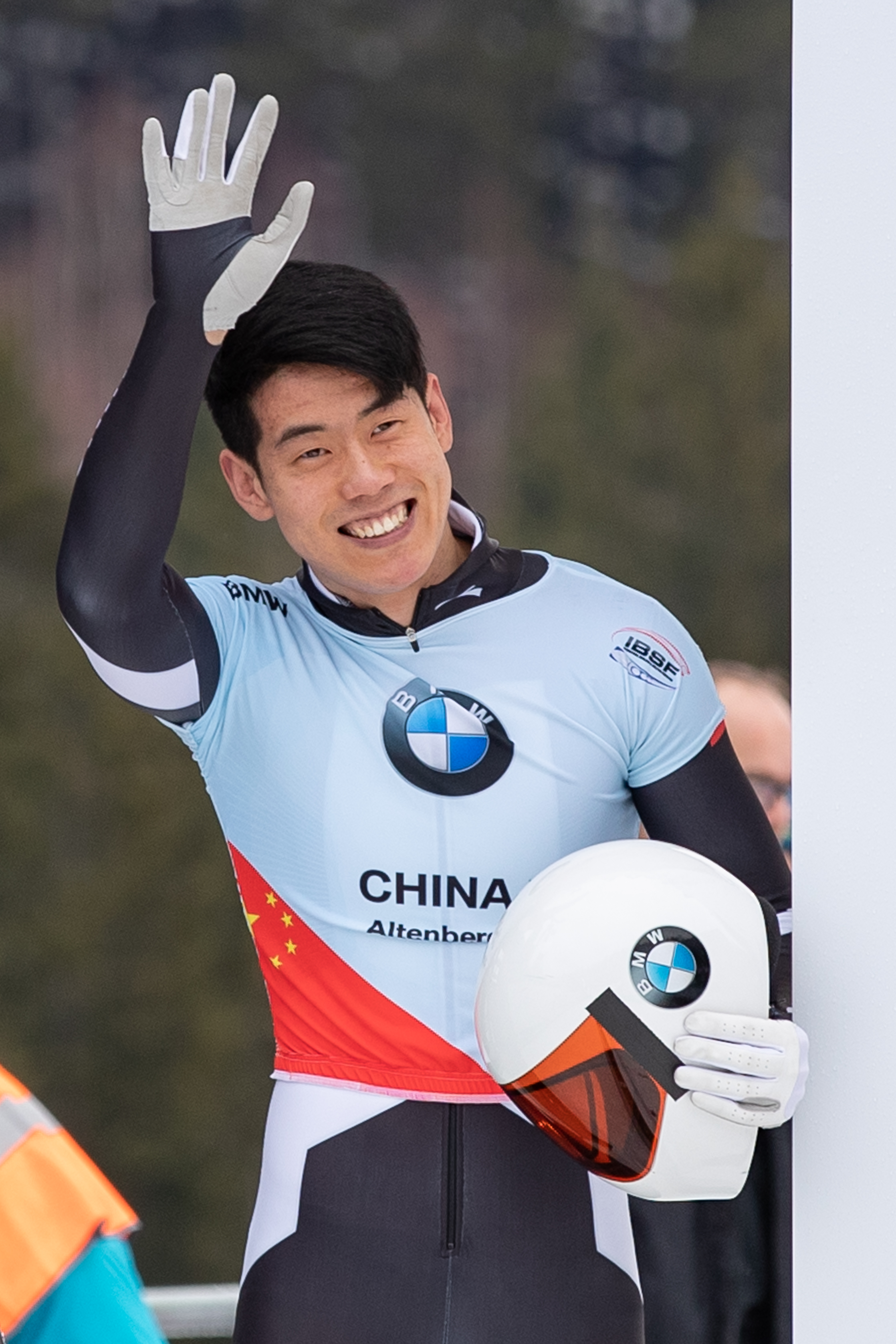
- Yan Wen'gang in 2020

Personal information
- Nationality: Chinese
- Born: 1 July 1997 (age 28) Wuqing County, Tianjin, China

Sport
- Country: China
- Sport: Skeleton
Medal record
Men's skeleton
Representing China
Olympic Games
Bronze medal – third place	2022 Beijing	Men

Yan Wengang (Chinese: 闫文港, born 1 July 1997) is a Chinese skeleton racer who competed at the 2022 Winter Olympics.

== Career ==
Yan represented China at the 2022 Winter Olympics in the men's skeleton event and won a bronze medal. This was China's first ever medal in a sliding sport at the Olympics.
