= Katsuyuki Miyajima =

Japanese skeleton racer (born 1995)

Personal information
- Nationality: Japanese
- Born: 27 December 1995 (age 30)
- Height: 1.77 m (5 ft 10 in)

Sport
- Sport: Skeleton

Katsuyuki Miyajima (宮嶋 克幸, Miyajima Katsuyuki; born 27 December 1995) is a Japanese skeleton racer. He competed in the 2018 Winter Olympics.
