= Hallie Clarke =

Canadian skeleton racer (born 2004)

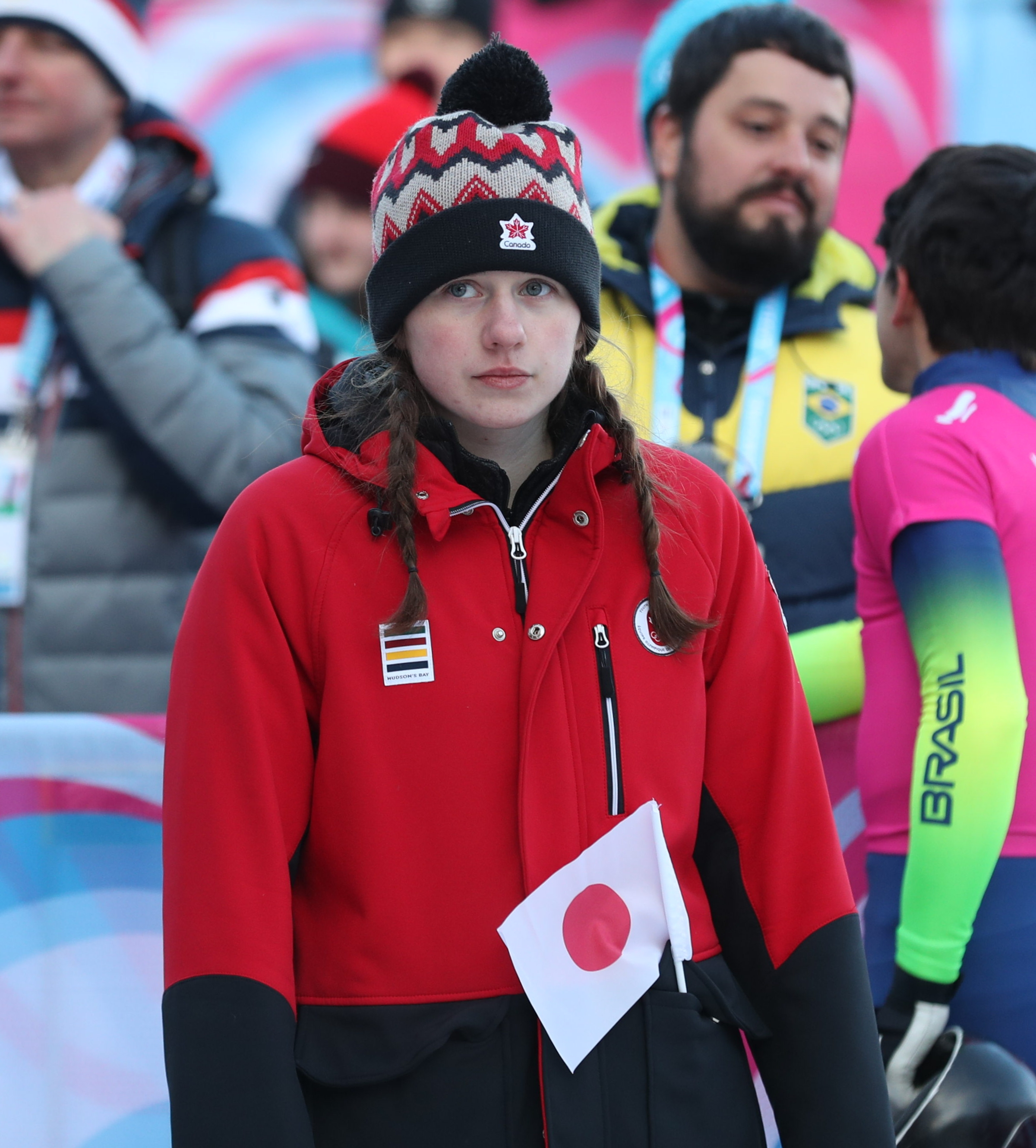
- Clarke in 2020

Personal information
- Born: 13 April 2004 (age 22) Belleville, Ontario, Canada

Sport
- Country: Canada
- Sport: Skeleton
- Coached by: Joe Cecchini
Medal record
Women's skeleton
Representing Canada
World Championships
Gold medal – first place	2024 Winterberg	Women
Junior World Championships
Gold medal – first place	2025 St. Moritz	Women

Hallie Clarke (born 13 April 2004) is a Canadian skeleton racer who represents Canada and previously competed for the United States. She became the youngest female world champion in skeleton history by winning the women's event at the 2024 IBSF World Championships.

Clarke was on 2nd twice in the 2022-23 World Cup season while representing the USA. She finished 2nd in Whistler and 2nd in Innsbruck.
