= Mun Ra-young =

South Korean skeleton racer

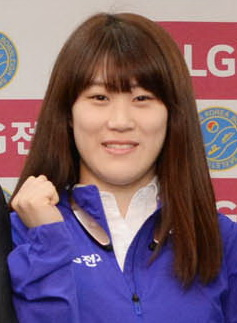

Personal information
- Nationality: South Korean
- Born: 28 February 1996 (age 29)
- Height: 169 cm (5 ft 7 in)
- Weight: 56 kg (123 lb)

Sport
- Country: South Korea
- Sport: Skeleton

Mun Ra-young (Korean: 문라영; born 28 February 1996) is a South Korean skeleton racer who competes on the Skeleton World Cup circuit. She started racing in 2012 and was selected to the Korean national team in 2014.
