= Alexander Schlintner =

Austrian Skeleton Athlete

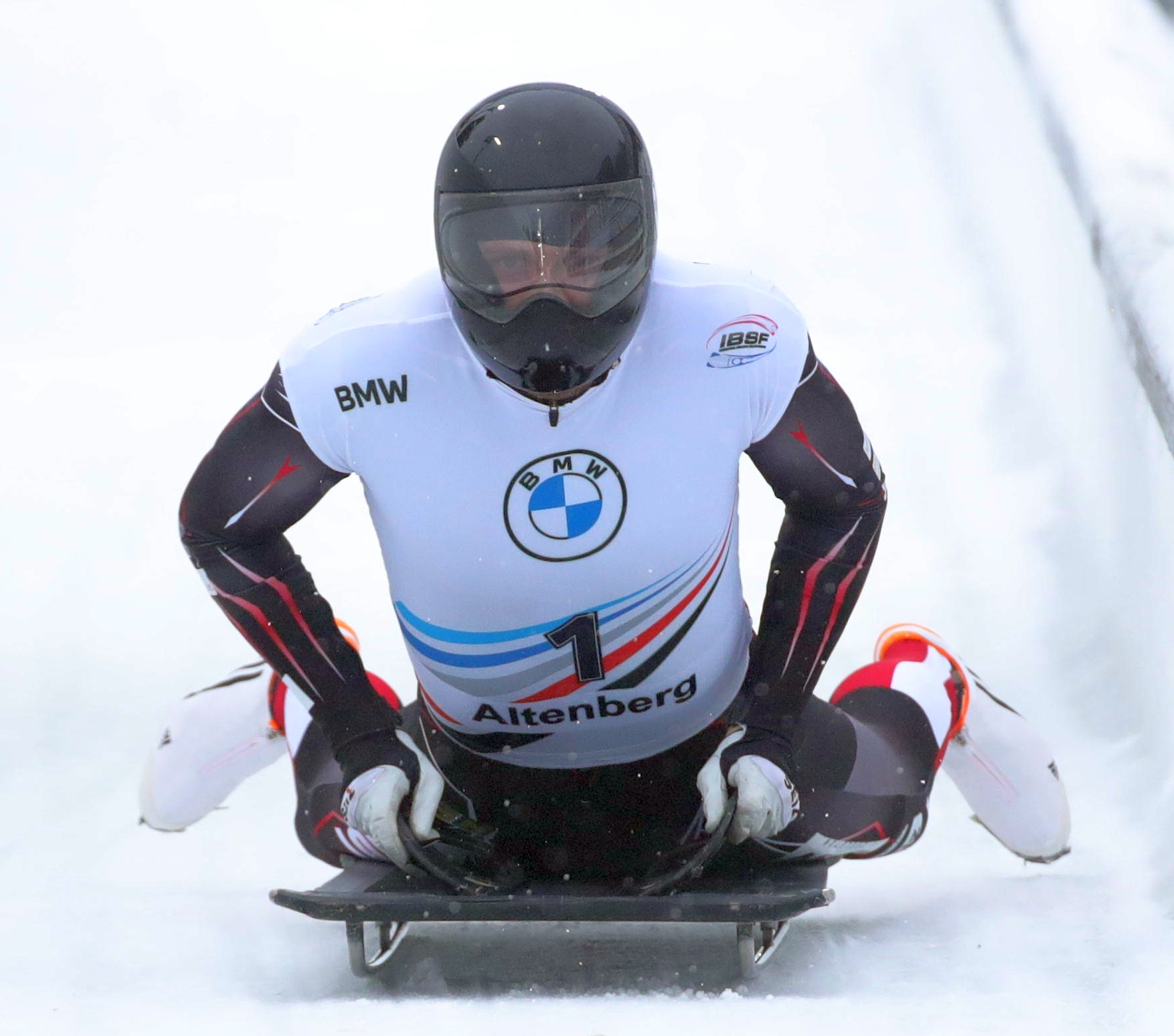
- Alexander Schlintner in 2023 at the IBSF World Cup Bob & Skeleton 2022-23 Altenberg and European Championships

Personal information
- Born: 27 January 1997 (age 29) Vienna, Austria

Sport
- Country: Austria
- Sport: Skeleton

Alexander Schlintner (born 27 January 1997) is an Austrian skeleton athlete who competed in the Men's skeleton competition at the 2022 Winter Olympics in Beijing, China. He finished 17th in the event.

His best result at an IBSF World Championship came in 2025, where he finished 12th.
