= María Montejano =

Spanish skeleton racer (born 1986)

Personal information
- Nationality: Spanish
- Born: 18 July 1986 (age 39) Barcelona, Spain
- Height: 165 cm (5 ft 5 in)
- Weight: 56 kg (123 lb)

Sport
- Country: Spain
- Sport: Skeleton
- Coached by: Sebastian Conesa, Martin Rettl

María Montejano (born 18 July 1986, in Barcelona, Spain) is a Spanish skeleton racer who competes on the Skeleton World Cup circuit. She started racing in 2008 on the Europe Cup, and joined the World Cup for the 2016–17 season. She has yet to record a World Cup finish higher than 20th (three times, all in calendar year 2017); her best finish on the Intercontinental Cup was 10th (at Lake Placid in 2015), and on the Continental Cups was 6th (once on the Europe Cup and once on the North American Cup circuit). Her personal coach is Sebastian Conesa and she uses a Dukurs sled.
