= Takako Oguchi =

Japanese skeleton racer (born 1984)

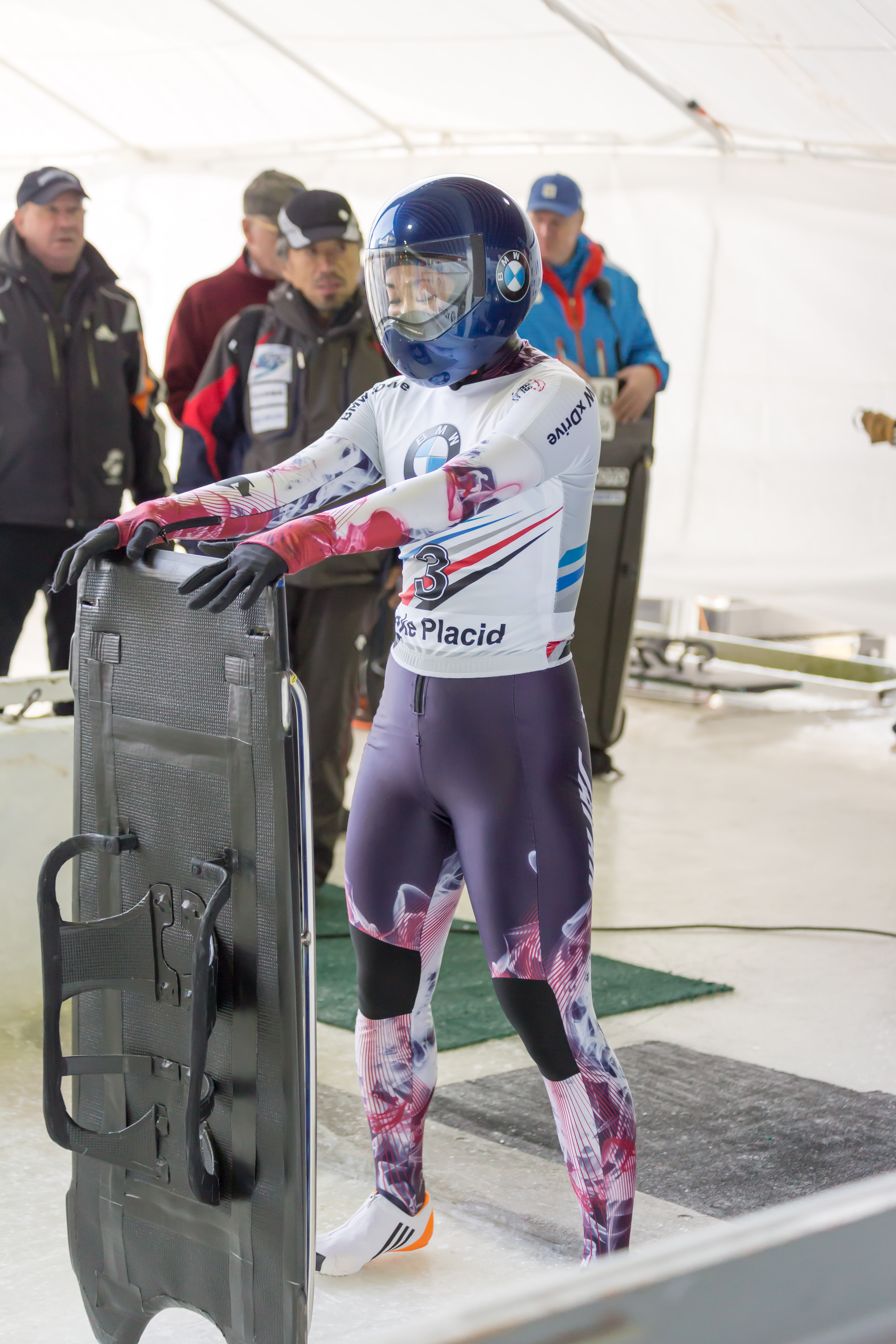
- Oguchi at the 2017 World Cup in Lake Placid

Personal information
- Native name: 小口貴子
- Birth name: Omukai Takako
- Nationality: Japanese
- Born: 8 August 1984 (age 40); Wajima
- Height: 161 cm (5 ft 3 in)
- Weight: 60 kg (132 lb)

Sport
- Country: Japan
- Sport: Skeleton
- Coached by: Kyle Tress

Achievements and titles
- Olympic finals: 19th (2018 Pyeongchang)

Takako Oguchi (小口貴子, Oguchi Takako; born August 8, 1984, in Wajima) (née Omukai) is a Japanese skeleton racer who has competed since 2003 and joined the Japanese national team in 2005. She uses a Bromley sled. She married in 2015.

== Notable results ==
Oguchi's first official start in international competition was in the 2006–07 season at Calgary on the North American Cup circuit, where she placed 23rd. This was followed by two ninth-place finishes, but she did not compete during the 2007–08 or 2008-09 seasons. She returned to competition for the 2009–10 season, and advanced to the Intercontinental Cup for 2012–13. Her first World Cup race was in 2013–14, also at Calgary, where she finished 19th, and since then has split her time between the ICC and World Cup circuits. Her best World Cup finish was 13th, in 2016 at Lake Placid. In the 2017 World Championships, she finished 21st, and she finished the 2016–17 in 26th place in the overall standings.
