= Zhao Dan (skeleton racer) =

Chinese skeleton racer (born 2002)

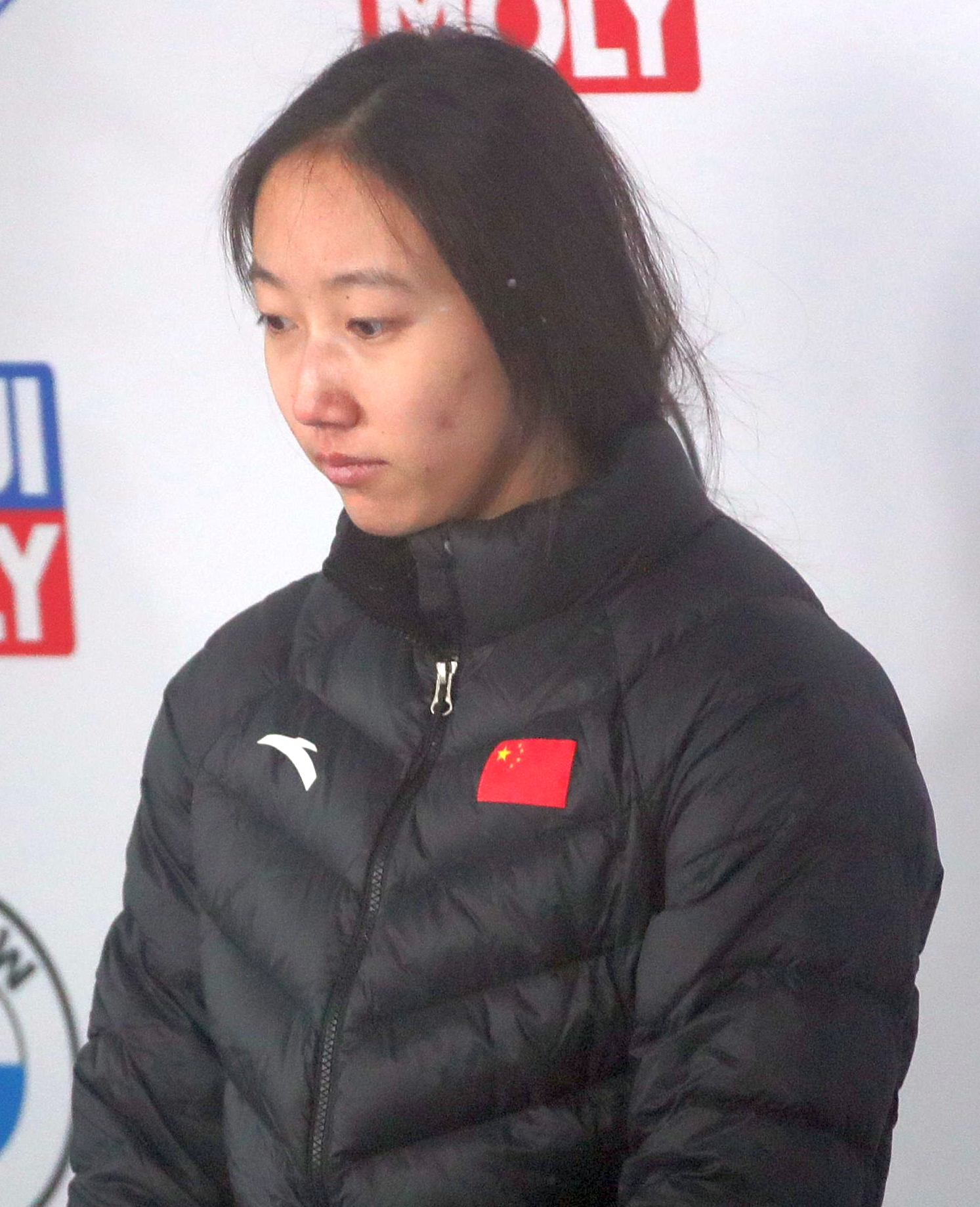
- Zhao in 2023

Personal information
- Born: 14 December 2002 (age 23)
Medal record
Women's skeleton
Representing China
World Championships
Bronze medal – third place	2025 Lake Placid	Mixed team

Zhao Dan (Chinese: 赵丹; born 14 December 2002) is a female Chinese skeleton racer from Horinger County, Hohhot, Inner Mongolia, who served as one of China's flag-bearers at the 2022 Winter Olympics opening ceremony.

Olympic Games
Preceded by Zhou Yang	Flagbearer for China (with Gao Tingyu); Beijing 2022	Succeeded by Ning Zhongyan & Zhang Chutong
