= IBSF World Championships 2020 =

Bobsleigh and skeleton competition

- Venue: Altenberg bobsleigh, luge, and skeleton track
- Location: Altenberg, Germany
- Dates: 21 February – 1 March

The 2020 IBSF World Championships were held in Altenberg, Germany from 21 February to 1 March 2020.

This World Championships saw the introduction of a skeleton mixed team event, consisting of one run each of men's and women's skeleton. This was also the first World Championship, since its introduction at the 2007 championships, without the mixed-sleds mixed team event, consisting of one run each of men's skeleton, women's skeleton, 2-man bobsleigh, and 2-women bobsleigh.

== Schedule ==
Six events were held.

All times are local (UTC+1).

Bobsleigh

Date	Time	Events
21 February	14:00	Two-women run 1 & 2
22 February	11:20	Two-men run 1 & 2
22 February	15:30	Two-women run 3 & 4
23 February	14:30	Two-men run 3 & 4
29 February	13:30	Four-men run 1 & 2
1 March	13:00	Four-men run 3 & 4

Skeleton

Date	Time	Events
27 February	10:00	Men run 1 & 2
28 February	09:30	Women run 1 & 2
28 February	13:00	Men run 3 & 4
29 February	09:30	Women run 3 & 4
1 March	10:00	Mixed team

== Medal summary ==
=== Medal table ===
* Host nation (Germany)

Rank	Nation	Gold	Silver	Bronze	Total
1	Germany*	5	4	2	11
2	United States	1	0	0	1
3	Canada	0	1	1	2
4	Switzerland	0	1	0	1
5	Austria	0	0	1	1
5	Italy	0	0	1	1
5	Latvia	0	0	1	1
Totals (7 entries)		6	6	6	18

=== Bobsleigh ===
Event	Gold		Silver		Bronze	
Two-man	Germany; Francesco Friedrich; Thorsten Margis	3:40.44	Germany; Johannes Lochner; Christopher Weber	3:42.09	Latvia; Oskars Ķibermanis; Matīss Miknis	3:42.23
Four-man	Germany; Francesco Friedrich; Arndt Bauer; Martin Grothkopp; Alexander Schüller	3:36.09	Germany; Johannes Lochner; Florian Bauer; Christopher Weber; Christian Rasp	3:36.14	Germany; Nico Walther; Paul Krenz; Joshua Bluhm; Eric Franke	3:36.32
Two-woman	United States; Kaillie Humphries; Lauren Gibbs	3:45.49	Germany; Kim Kalicki; Kira Lipperheide	3:45.86	Canada; Christine de Bruin; Kristen Bujnowski	3:46.55

=== Skeleton ===
Event	Gold		Silver		Bronze	
Men	Christopher Grotheer; Germany	3:44.81	Axel Jungk; Germany	3:44.83	Alexander Gassner; Germany	3:44.86
Women	Tina Hermann; Germany	3:54.52	Marina Gilardoni; Switzerland	3:54.74	Janine Flock; Austria	3:55.43
Skeleton mixed team	Germany; Jacqueline Lölling; Alexander Gassner	1:55.39	Canada; Jane Channell; Dave Greszczyszyn	1:55.40	Italy; Valentina Margaglio; Mattia Gaspari	1:55.82
