= Marina Gilardoni =

Swiss skeleton racer and bobsledder

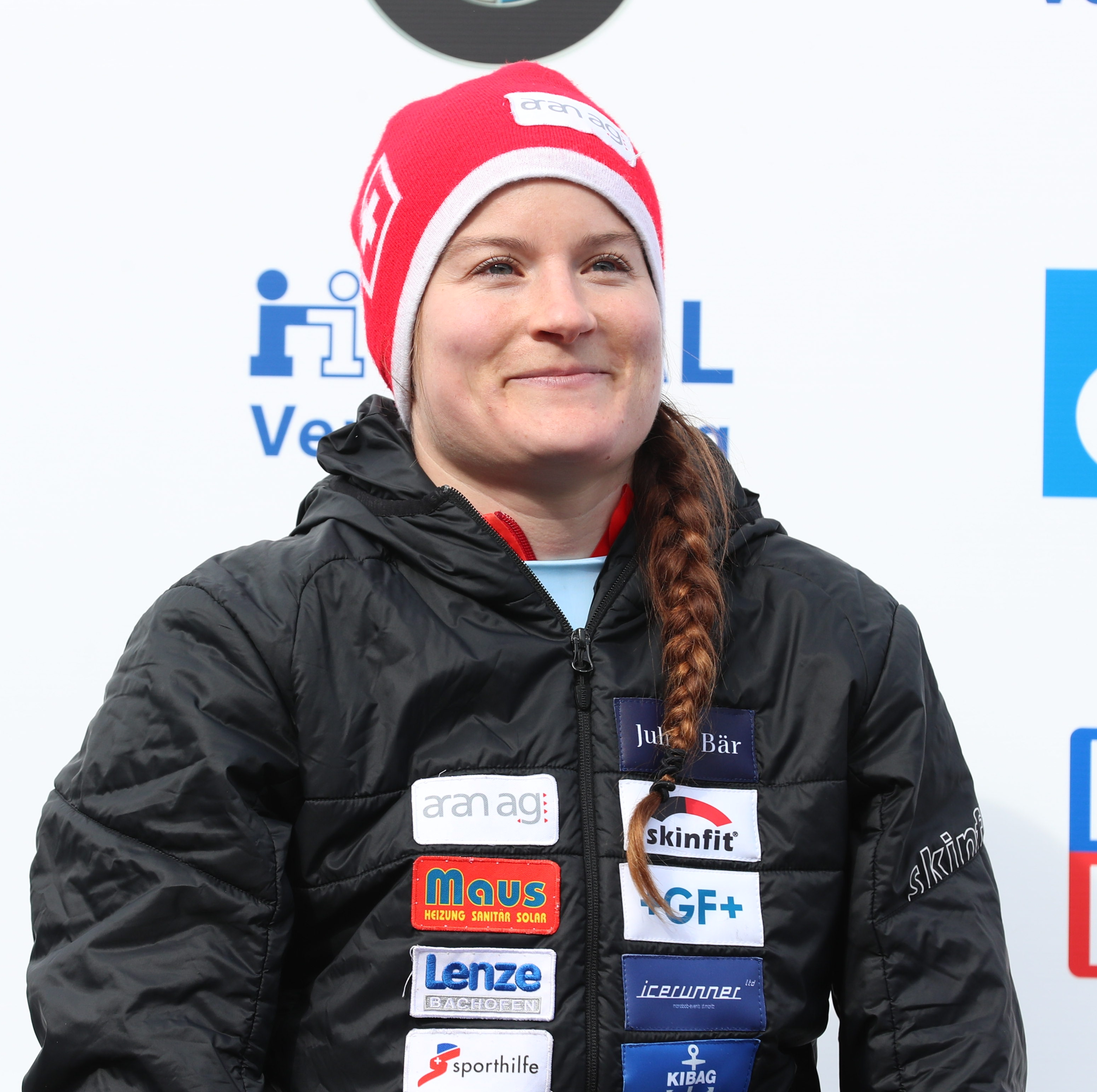
- Gilardoni in 2020

Personal information
- Nationality: Swiss
- Born: 4 March 1987 (age 39) Goldingen, Switzerland
- Height: 165 cm (5 ft 5 in)
- Weight: 65 kg (143 lb)
- Website: www.marina-gilardoni.ch

Sport
- Country: Switzerland
- Sport: Bobsleigh (2007–2010); Skeleton (2011–present)

Achievements and titles
- Olympic finals: 18th (2014 Sochi) 11th (2018 Pyeongchang)
- Highest world ranking: 5th (2015–16 Skeleton World Cup)
Medal record
Bobsleigh
Junior World Championships
Gold medal – first place	2008 Igls	Two women
Gold medal – first place	2010 St. Moritz	Two women
Skeleton
World Championships
Silver medal – second place	2020 Altenberg	Women
European Championships
Silver medal – second place	2020 Sigulda	Women
Bronze medal – third place	2016 Königssee	Women

Marina Gilardoni (born 4 March 1987) is a Swiss skeleton racer and former bobsleigh brakewoman. After starting her sporting career in heptathlon at the club level, Gilardoni began racing bobsleigh in 2007 and earned a place on the Swiss national team. She won gold medals at the Junior World Championships in 2008 behind driver Fabienne Meyer and in 2010 with Sabina Hafner driving. After the 2009–10 season, she switched from bobsleigh to skeleton. In 2018, Gilardoni was selected to represent Switzerland in the Winter Olympics in Pyeongchang after the Dutch Olympic Committee refused one of their two entries and it was reallocated to Switzerland.

== Notable results ==
Gilardoni's only podium finishes in bobsleigh were the two Junior World Championship wins. After switching to skeleton, she spent the 2010–11 season on the Europe Cup circuit but was quickly promoted to the Swiss World Cup squad for 2011–12, with the goal of maintaining the Swiss athlete quota in the World Cup. At her first World Cup race (Igls 2011), Gilardoni finished 14th. She competed in the 2014 Winter Olympics in Sochi, finishing 18th. Gilardoni's most successful season was 2015–16, when she earned four podiums (silver at Lake Placid and bronzes at Königssee and St. Moritz) on the way to an overall season ranking of fifth. Since then, her performance has been hampered by a nagging back injury, Gilardoni won the Swiss national championship at St. Moritz in December 2017, by six seconds over Alena Huber.
