= Mattia Gaspari =

Italian skeleton racer (born 1993)

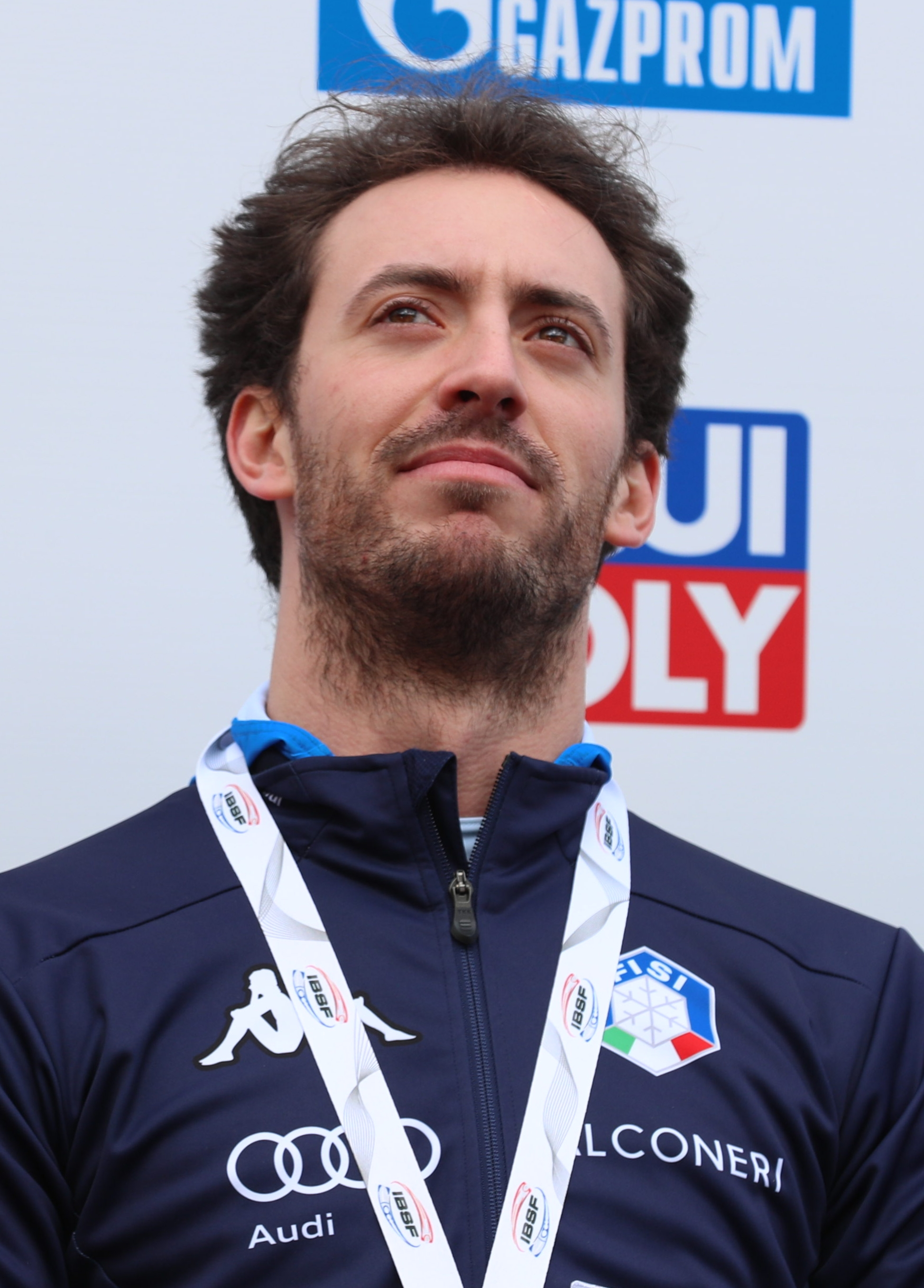
- Gaspari in 2020

Personal information
- Nationality: Italian
- Born: 14 September 1993 (age 32) Pieve di Cadore, Italy
- Height: 1.80 m (5 ft 11 in)
- Weight: 85 kg (187 lb)

Sport
- Country: Italy
- Sport: Skeleton
- Club: Fiamme Azzurre
Medal record
World Championships
Bronze medal – third place	2020 Altenberg	Mixed skeleton

Mattia Gaspari (born 14 September 1993) is an Italian skeleton racer.

He won a historic medal for Italy, the first ever in the skeleton at the world championships, at the IBSF World Championships 2020.

== Achievements ==
Year	Competition	Venue	Position	Event	Time
2020	World Championships	(Germany) Altenberg	3rd	Mixed team	1:55.82
