= Kendall Wesenberg =

American skeleton racer (born 1990)

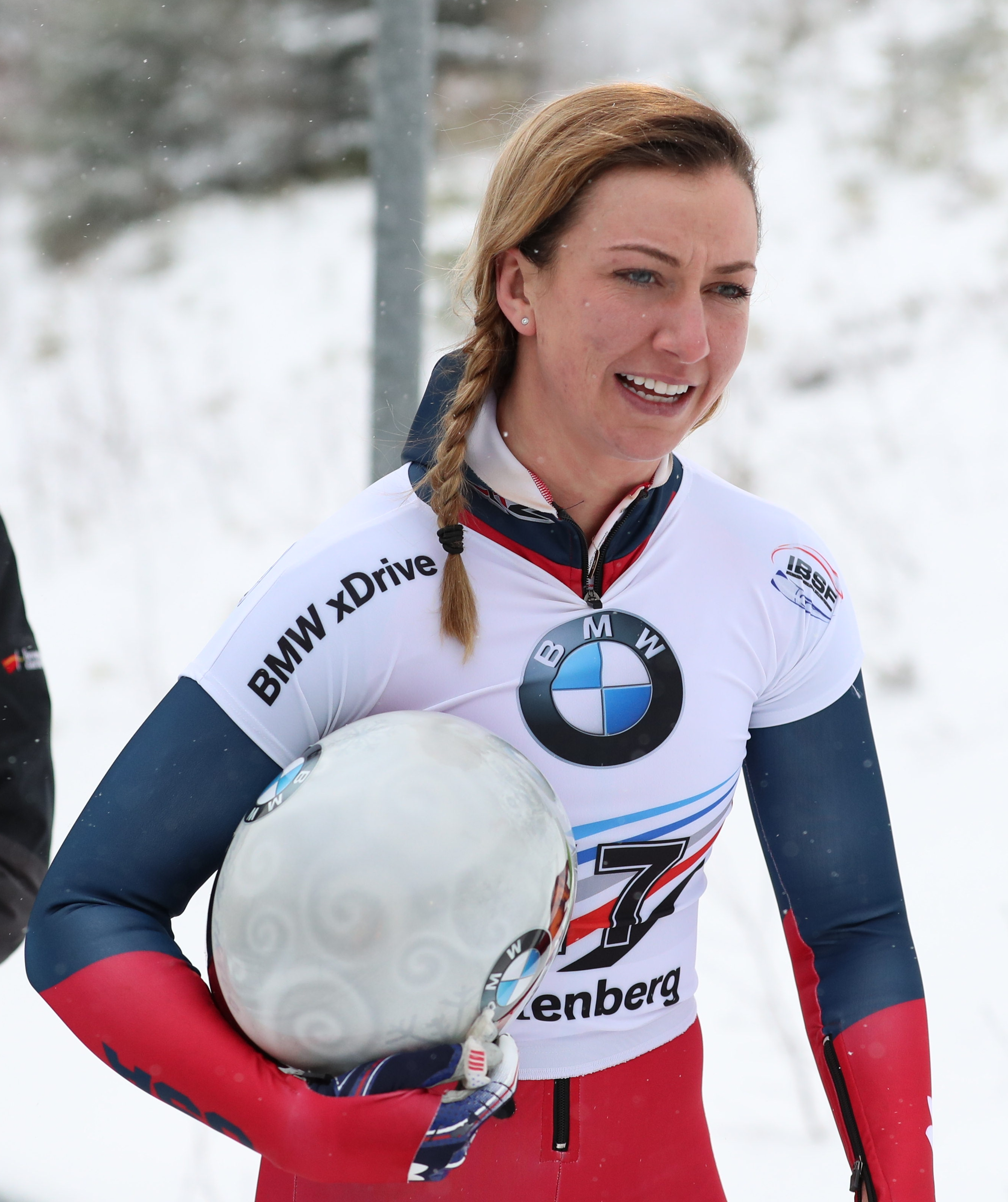
- Wesenberg in 2019

Personal information
- Nationality: American
- Born: Kendall Lorraine Wesenberg; August 23, 1990 (age 35) Castro Valley, California
- Education: University of Colorado Boulder
- Height: 5 ft 8 in (173 cm)
- Weight: 150 lb (68 kg)
- Spouse: Whitney Fenimore (m. 2022)

Sport
- Country: United States
- Sport: Skeleton

Achievements and titles
- Olympic finals: 17th (Pyeongchang 2018)
Medal record
World Cup
Silver medal – second place	2017 St. Moritz	Women

Kendall Lorraine Wesenberg (born August 23, 1990) is an American skeleton racer who competes on the Skeleton World Cup circuit. Wesenberg attended the University of Colorado, where she studied business administration, and lives in Nashville, Tennessee. She began racing skeleton in 2014. Wesenberg was named, along with Katie Uhlaender, to represent the U.S. in women's skeleton at the 2018 Winter Olympics in Pyeongchang.

== Personal life ==
Wesenberg is bisexual. She married Whitney Fenimore who was her girlfriend of 3 years on June 4, 2022 at Tahoe Mountain Club in California. Fenimore is a musician who was a semi-finalist on The Voice.

== Notable results ==
Wesenberg started competing internationally in 2014–15 on the Europe Cup circuit, winning her very first race, at Lillehammer. She went on, with three fourth-place finishes and two seconds, to become the first American woman to win the overall Europe Cup season rankings.

She moved immediately to the World Cup for the 2015–16 season, taking 15th place at the World Championships in Igls and 11th in the season rankings. She took her first (and so far only) World Cup podium in 2017, with a silver medal at St. Moritz, and improved her World Championships performance to 13th at Königssee; also at the 2017 Worlds, she was on a team event (combined bobsled and skeleton) squad that finished 10th.
