= Jane Channell =

Canadian skeleton racer (born 1988)

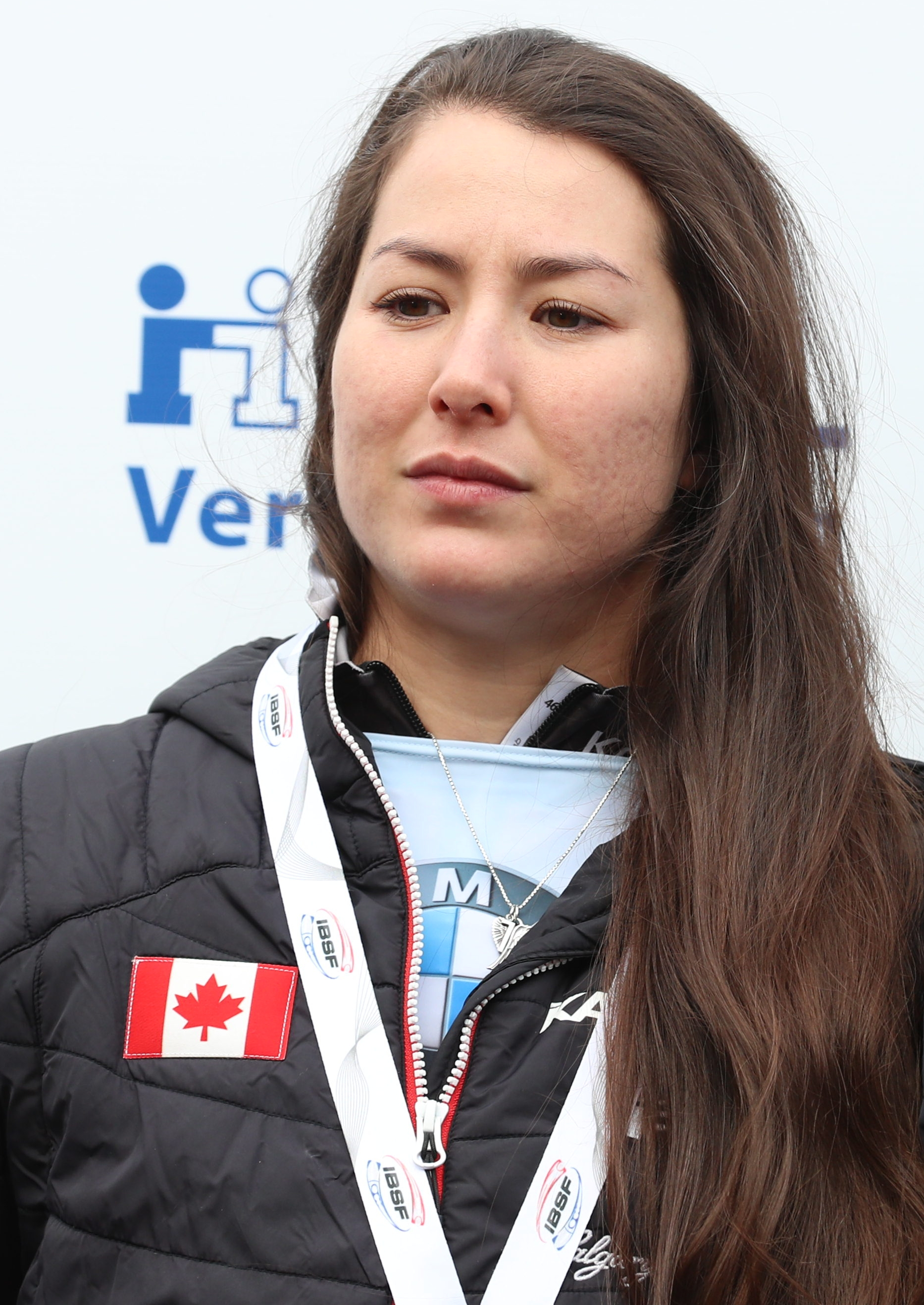
- Channell in 2020

Personal information
- Nationality: Canadian
- Born: August 23, 1988 (age 37) North Vancouver, British Columbia, Canada
- Education: Simon Fraser University
- Height: 168 cm (5 ft 6 in)
- Weight: 65 kg (143 lb)
- Website: seejaneslide.com

Sport
- Country: Canada
- Sport: Skeleton

Achievements and titles
- Olympic finals: 10th (Pyeongchang 2018); 17th (Beijing 2022)
Medal record
World Championships
Silver medal – second place	2020 Altenberg	Mixed skeleton

Jane Channell (born August 23, 1988) is a Canadian skeleton racer who has competed since 2011 and was selected to the national team in 2013, joining the Skeleton World Cup squad in 2015. Channell was inspired to try skeleton by Jon Montgomery's gold medal at the 2010 Winter Olympics in Vancouver. Before skeleton, Channell played softball and competed in track and field, winning the Great Northwest Athletic Conference indoor track titles in 60 metres and 200 metres. Channell was named one of the three women to represent Canada in skeleton at the 2018 Winter Olympics in Pyeongchang after finishing fifth in both the overall and World Cup standings for the 2017–18 season.

In January 2022, Channell was named to Canada's 2022 Olympic team.

== Notable results ==
In the 2015–16 season, Channell had seven top-ten finishes out of the eight races and finished third in the overall ranking, but dropped to 11th overall in the 2016–17 season. Her best individual finish on the World Cup was a silver medal at the 2015–16 race in Park City, a result which she equalled in 2017 at Whistler. Her best result in the IBSF World Championships was in 2015 at Winterberg.
