= Valentina Margaglio =

Italian skeleton racer (born 1993)

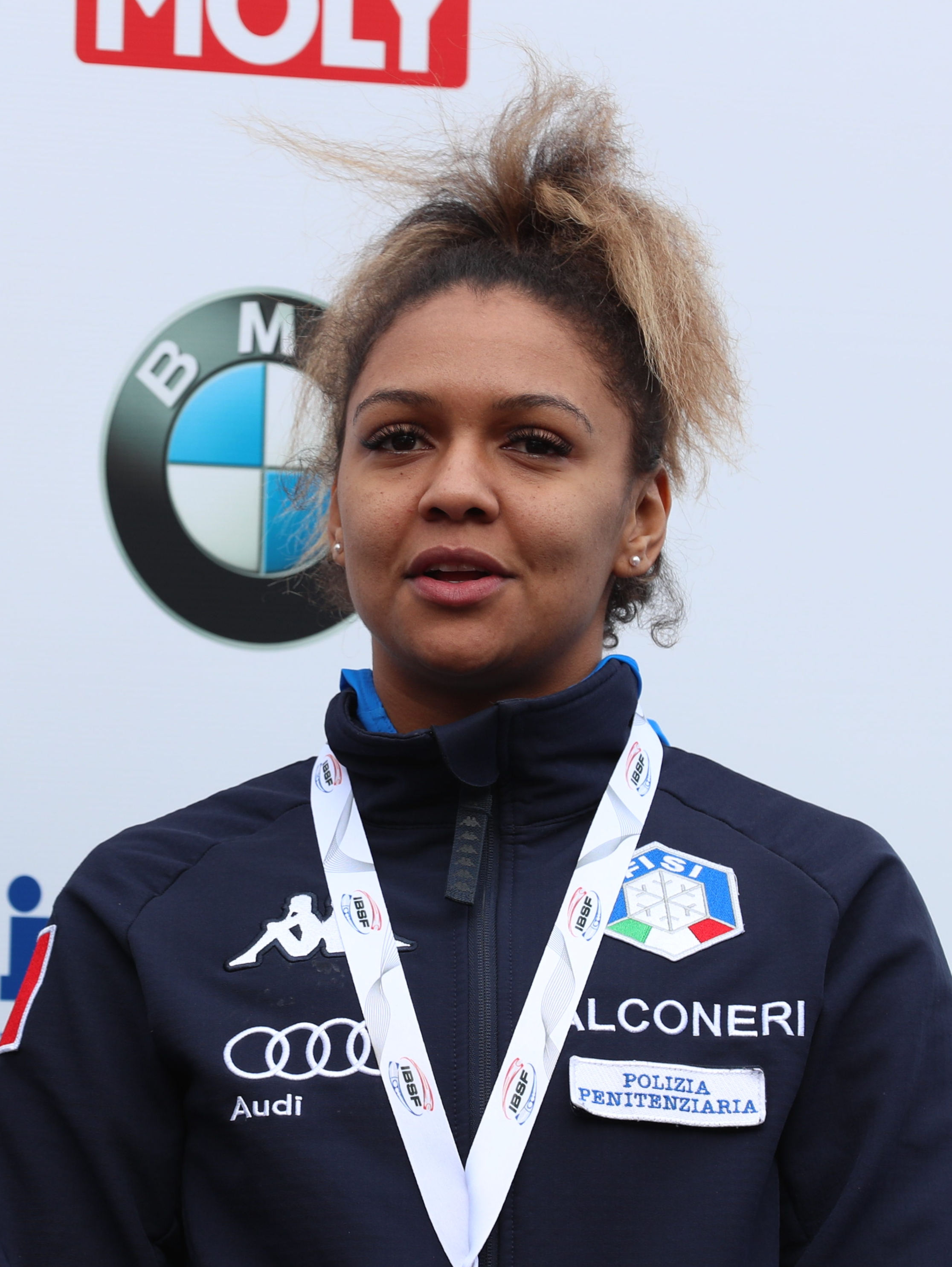
- Margaglio in 2020

Personal information
- Nationality: Italian
- Born: 15 November 1993 (age 32) Casale Monferrato, Italy
- Height: 1.73 m (5 ft 8 in)
- Weight: 70 kg (154 lb)

Sport
- Country: Italy
- Sport: Skeleton
- Club: Fiamme Azzurre
Medal record
Women's skeleton
Representing Italy
World Championships
Bronze medal – third place	2020 Altenberg	Mixed skeleton
European Championships
Bronze medal – third place	2022 St. Moritz	Women

Valentina Margaglio (born 15 November 1993) is an Italian skeleton racer. She won a medal for Italy at the IBSF World Championships 2020, the first ever for Italy in the skeleton.

== Biography ==
She was born to an Italian father and mother from the Ivory Coast. She has competed at a national level in both speed and strength disciplines, including the shot put and the javelin throw.

In 2011 she started competing in bobsleigh as a brakeman, participating in the 2012 Winter Youth Olympic Games in Innsbruck. Her skeleton debut for the Italian national team was in January 2016 at the European Cup, coming ninth in the overall standings at the end of the 2019/20 season.

== Achievements ==
Year	Competition	Venue	Position	Event	Time
2020	World Championships	(Germany) Altenberg	3rd	Mixed team	1:55.82
