= 2014–15 Skeleton World Cup =

Winners
- Men: Martins Dukurs (LAT)
- Women: Janine Flock (AUT)

Competitions
- Venues: 8 (8 events)

The 2014–15 Skeleton World Cup was a multi-race tournament over a season for skeleton. The season started on 12 December 2014 in Lake Placid, New York, United States, and ended on 15 February 2015 in Sochi, Russia. The World Cup is organised by the FIBT who also runs World Cups and Championships in bobsleigh. The season was sponsored by Viessmann.

== Calendar ==
Below is the schedule of the 2014–15 season

Venue	Date	Details
(United States) Lake Placid	12 December 2014	
(Canada) Calgary	19 December 2014	
(Germany) Altenberg	9–10 January 2015	
(Germany) Königssee	16–17 January 2015	
(Switzerland) St. Moritz	23 January 2015	
(France) La Plagne	30–31 January 2015	Due to track conditions, the women's race was cancelled and the men's race was shortened to one run; also served as FIBT European Championships for men.
(Austria) Igls	7–8 February 2015	Double race for women; also served as FIBT European Championships for women (second race only).
(Russia) Sochi	14–15 February 2015	

== Results ==
=== Men ===
Event:	Gold:	Time	Silver:	Time	Bronze:	Time
(United States) Lake Placid	(Latvia) Martins Dukurs	1:47.42 (53.74 / 53.68)	(Latvia) Tomass Dukurs	1:47.72 (53.89 / 53.83)	(United States) Matthew Antoine	1:47.86 (53.84 / 54.02)
(Canada) Calgary	(Latvia) Martins Dukurs	1:51.06 (55.70 / 55.36)	(Latvia) Tomass Dukurs	1:51.96 (56.11 / 55.85)	(South Korea) Yun Sung-bin	1:52.23 (56.39 / 55.84)
(Germany) Altenberg	(Latvia) Martins Dukurs	1:57.25 (58.01 / 59.24)	(Latvia) Tomass Dukurs	1:58.35 (58.83 / 59.52)	(Russia) Aleksandr Tretyakov	1:58.47 (59.02 / 59.45)
(Germany) Königssee	(Russia) Aleksandr Tretyakov	1:42.98 (51.37 / 51.61)	(Latvia) Martins Dukurs	1:43.15 (51.47 / 51.68)	(United States) Matthew Antoine	1:43.29 (51.74 / 51.55)
(Switzerland) St. Moritz	(Latvia) Martins Dukurs	2:16.17 (1:08.25 / 1:07.92)	(South Korea) Yun Sung-bin	2:16.77 (1:08.45 / 1:08.32)	(Russia) Nikita Tregubov	2:17.36 (1:08.92 / 1:08.44)
(France) La Plagne	(Latvia) Martins Dukurs	59.77	(Russia) Aleksandr Tretyakov	1:00.17	(Latvia) Tomass Dukurs	1:00.64
(Austria) Igls	(Latvia) Martins Dukurs	1:45.52 (52.67 / 52.85)	(Russia) Aleksandr Tretyakov	1:45.97 (53.00 / 52.97)	(Russia) Nikita Tregubov	1:46.26 (53.03 / 53.23)
(Russia) Sochi	(Russia) Aleksandr Tretyakov	1:52.40 (56.27 / 56.13)	(Latvia) Martins Dukurs	1:52.81 (56.37 / 56.44)	(South Korea) Yun Sung-bin	1:53.68 (56.94 / 56.74)

=== Women ===
Event:	Gold:	Time	Silver:	Time	Bronze:	Time
(United States) Lake Placid	(United Kingdom) Lizzy Yarnold	1:51.13 (55.47 / 55.66)	(Canada) Elisabeth Vathje	1:51.90 (55.77 / 56.13)	(Austria) Janine Flock	1:52.04 (55.94 / 56.10)
(Canada) Calgary	(Canada) Elisabeth Vathje	1:55.31 (57.75 / 57.56)	(United Kingdom) Laura Deas	1:55.62 (57.91 / 57.71)	(Germany) Tina Hermann	1:55.64 (58.00 / 57.64)
(Germany) Altenberg	(Russia) Maria Orlova	1:58.65 (59.41 / 59.24)	(United Kingdom) Lizzy Yarnold	1:58.69 (59.37 / 59.32)	(Russia) Elena Nikitina	1:58.87 (59.73 / 59.14)
(Germany) Königssee	(United Kingdom) Lizzy Yarnold	1:44.24 (52.06 / 52.18)	(Germany) Anja Huber	1:44.95 (52.42 / 52.53)	(Russia) Maria Orlova	1:45.10 (52.51 / 52.59)
(Switzerland) St. Moritz	(Austria) Janine Flock	2:20.34 (1:10.40 / 1:09.94)	(Canada) Elisabeth Vathje	2:20.43 (1:10.53 / 1:09.90)	(United Kingdom) Laura Deas	2:20.58 (1:10.45 / 1:10.13)
(France) La Plagne	Cancelled due to track conditions, race made up in Igls (Race 2)					
(Austria) Igls (Race 1)	(United Kingdom) Lizzy Yarnold	1:49.46 (54.90 / 54.56)	(Canada) Elisabeth Vathje	1:49.64 (54.81 / 54.83)	(Austria) Janine Flock	1:49.83 (54.79 / 55.04)
(Austria) Igls (Race 2)	(United Kingdom) Lizzy Yarnold	1:48.84 (54.52 / 54.32)	(Austria) Janine Flock	1:49.14 (54.70 / 54.44)	(United Kingdom) Rose McGrandle	1:49.23 (54.68 / 54.55)
(Russia) Sochi	(United Kingdom) Lizzy Yarnold	1:56.57 (57.94 / 58.63)	(Russia) Maria Orlova	1:56.61 (58.51 / 58.10)	(Germany) Anja Huber	1:56.92 (58.44 / 58.48)

== Standings ==
=== Men ===
Pos.	Racer	(United States) LKP	(Canada) CAL	(Germany) ALT	(Germany) KON	(Switzerland) STM	(France) LPL	(Austria) IGL	(Russia) SOC	Points
1	Martins Dukurs (LAT)	1	1	1	2	1	1	1	2	1770
2	Tomass Dukurs (LAT)	2	2	2	8	5	3	8	4	1526
3	Axel Jungk (GER)	4	5	4	7	6	7	9	6	1408
4	Matthew Antoine (USA)	3	6	15	3	11	8	11	8	1272
5	Dominic Parsons (GBR)	14	7	11	4	4	10	10	10	1232
6	Yun Sung-bin (KOR)	–	3	10	13	2	9	4	3	1218
7	Aleksandr Tretyakov (RUS)	–	–	3	1	10	2	2	1	1214
8	Christopher Grotheer (GER)	15	4	12	11	9	4	5	–	1088
9	Dave Greszczyszyn (CAN)	8	8	13	16	13	13	12	7	1072
10	Matthias Guggenberger (AUT)	9	8	7	10	21	18	14	8	1038
11	Sergei Chudinov (RUS)	–	–	6	15	7	6	5	5	992
12	Nikita Tregubov (RUS)	–	–	5	5	3	5	3	–	952
13	Kilian von Schleinitz (GER)	17	12	9	6	12	11	13	–	928
14	Hiroatsu Takahashi (JPN)	12	11	7	9	14	12	22	–	880
15	Kyle Tress (USA)	5	13	20	25	26	14	19	13	754
16	Raphael Maier (AUT)	6	17	16	12	15	17	20	–	748
17	Barrett Martineau (CAN)	16	21	21	18	22	19	17	17	606
18	Yuki Sasahara (JPN)	19	19	18	17	17	16	18	–	580
19	Mattia Gaspari (ITA)	–	–	14	13	19	15	15	–	514
20	Ronald Auderset (SUI)	22	20	22	22	18	20	23	18	514
21	Ed Smith (GBR)	18	18	17	20	23	–	–	16	462
22	Evan Neufeldt (CAN)	–	–	19	19	8	–	21	19	444
23	Anton Batuev (RUS)	7	16	–	–	–	–	–	11	400
24	Joseph Luke Cecchini (ITA)	20	15	–	–	–	–	24	12	345
25	Ander Mirambell (ESP)	24	25	26	28	27	23	25	21	333
26	Pavel Kulikov (RUS)	11	10	–	–	–	–	–	–	280
27	John Farrow (AUS)	21	27	24	21	20	–	–	–	269
28	Dorin Velicu (ROU)	–	–	25	27	24	26	16	–	249
29	Alexander Mutovin (RUS)	13	14	–	–	–	–	–	–	232
30	Kyle Brown (USA)	–	–	28	23	16	–	–	22	230
31	Rhys Thornbury (NZL)	–	–	27	24	28	22	27	–	193
32	Lee Han-sin (KOR)	23	22	–	–	–	–	26	23	192
33	Stephen Garbett (USA)	10	26	–	–	–	–	–	–	180
34	David Michael Swift (GBR)	–	–	–	–	–	–	7	–	168
35	Dominic Rady (GER)	–	–	–	–	–	–	–	14	112
36	Alexandros Kefalas (GRE)	–	–	–	–	25	23	30	–	110
37	Giovanni Mulassano (ITA)	–	–	23	26	29	–	–	–	110
38	Michael Zachrau (GER)	–	–	–	–	–	–	–	15	104
39	Allen Blackwell (USA)	–	–	–	–	–	21	28	–	90
40	Greg Rafter (CAN)	25	24	–	–	–	–	–	–	85
41	Alexander Auer (AUT)	–	–	–	–	–	–	–	20	68
42	Sean Greenwood (IRL)	–	23	–	–	–	–	–	–	50
43	Nicholas Timmings (AUS)	–	–	–	–	–	25	–	–	40
44	Dean Timmings (AUS)	–	–	–	–	–	–	29	–	24

=== Women ===
Pos.	Racer	(United States) LKP	(Canada) CAL	(Germany) ALT	(Germany) KON	(Switzerland) STM	(Austria) IGL2	(Austria) IGL1	(Russia) SOC	Points
1	Janine Flock (AUT)	3	4	12	5	1	2	3	4	1531
2	Lizzy Yarnold (GBR)	1	–	2	1	6	1	1	1	1511
3	Tina Hermann (GER)	4	3	4	6	5	5	5	5	1496
4	Anja Huber (GER)	10	8	7	2	8	8	10	3	1346
5	Laura Deas (GBR)	12	2	10	11	3	7	6	9	1314
6	Sophia Griebel (GER)	7	4	4	4	10	12	13	7	1304
7	Rose McGrandle (GBR)	6	6	8	14	11	3	8	11	1256
8	Marina Gilardoni (SUI)	8	9	6	8	19	6	4	8	1250
9	Lanette Prediger (CAN)	11	7	15	10	4	17	9	12	1112
10	Elisabeth Vathje (CAN)	2	1	20	–	2	–	2	6	1099
11	Joska Le Conte (NED)	16	15	18	7	12	13	18	10	920
12	Maria Orlova (RUS)	–	–	1	3	20	4	–	2	895
13	Anne O'Shea (USA)	9	12	17	9	23	13	17	17	866
14	Jane Channell (CAN)	–	–	11	13	7	11	7	13	848
15	Savannah Graybill (USA)	5	11	19	17	16	18	20	15	830
16	Carina Mair (AUT)	15	14	12	16	9	–	14	–	704
17	Elena Nikitina (RUS)	–	–	3	12	17	9	12	–	696
18	Svetlana Vasilyeva (RUS)	13	–	9	21	21	16	16	16	684
19	Takako Omukai (JPN)	14	18	14	18	13	–	22	–	560
20	Maria Marinela Mazilu (ROU)	–	–	21	20	15	10	11	–	514
21	Lelde Priedulēna (LAT)	–	–	16	15	14	15	19	–	490
22	Eiko Nakayama (JPN)	17	19	22	19	18	–	–	–	372
23	Jaclyn Narracott (AUS)	21	17	–	–	22	19	21	–	342
24	Madison Charney (CAN)	19	10	–	–	–	–	–	–	218
25	Olga Potylitsina (RUS)	–	–	–	–	–	–	15	14	216
26	Yulia Kanakina (RUS)	18	13	–	–	–	–	–	–	200
27	Anastasia Novikova (RUS)	20	16	–	–	–	–	–	–	164
