= 2015–16 Skeleton World Cup =

Winners
- Men's singles: Martins Dukurs (LAT)
- Women's singles: Tina Hermann (GER)

Competitions
- Venues: 7 (8 events)

The 2015–16 Skeleton World Cup was a multi-race tournament over a season for skeleton. The season started on 27 November 2015 in Altenberg, Germany, and ended on 28 February 2016 in Königssee, Germany. The World Cup was organised by the IBSF (formerly the FIBT) who also run World Cups and Championships in bobsleigh. The season was sponsored by BMW.

== Calendar ==
Venue	Date	Details
(Germany) Altenberg	27–28 November 2015	
(Germany) Winterberg	4–5 December 2015	
(Germany) Königssee	11–12 December 2015	
(United States) Lake Placid	8–9 January 2016	
(United States) Park City	16 January 2016	
(Canada) Whistler	22–23 January 2016	
(Switzerland) St. Moritz	5 February 2016	
(Germany) Königssee	27–28 February 2016	

== Results ==
=== Men ===
Event:	Gold:	Time	Silver:	Time	Bronze:	Time
(Germany) Altenberg	(Latvia) Martins Dukurs	1:52.90 (56.46 / 56.43)	(Russia) Aleksandr Tretyakov	1:52.93 (56.24 / 56.69)	(Russia) Nikita Tregubov	1:53.24 (56.36 / 56.88)
(Germany) Winterberg	(Latvia) Martins Dukurs	1:54.73 (56.97 / 57.76)	(Russia) Aleksandr Tretyakov (Germany) Axel Jungk	1:55.29 (57.41 / 57.88); 1:55.29 (57.15 / 58.14)		
(Germany) Königssee	(Latvia) Martins Dukurs	1:40.28 (50.25 / 50.03)	(Russia) Aleksandr Tretyakov	1:40.71 (50.23 / 50.48)	(South Korea) Yun Sung-bin	1:41.16 (50.63 / 50.53)
(United States) Lake Placid	(Latvia) Martins Dukurs	1:48.28 (53.77 / 54.51)	(South Korea) Yun Sung-bin	1:48.76 (53.99 / 54.77)	(Latvia) Tomass Dukurs	1:49.13 (54.29 / 54.84)
(United States) Park City	(Latvia) Martins Dukurs	1:38.35 (48.99 / 49.36)	(South Korea) Yun Sung-bin	1:38.73 (49.15 / 49.58)	(Germany) Axel Jungk	1:39.05 (49.43 / 49.62)
(Canada) Whistler	(Latvia) Martins Dukurs	1:44.31 (52.15 / 52.16)	(Latvia) Tomass Dukurs	1:44.59 (52.48 / 52.11)	(South Korea) Yun Sung-bin	1:45.24 (52.75 / 52.49)
(Switzerland) St. Moritz	(South Korea) Yun Sung-bin	2:18.26 (1:09.44 / 1:08.82)	(Latvia) Tomass Dukurs (Latvia) Martins Dukurs	2:18.33 (1:09.29 / 1:09.04); 2:18.33 (1:09.28 / 1:09.05)		
(Germany) Königssee	(Latvia) Martins Dukurs	1:40.82 (50.49 / 50.33)	(South Korea) Yun Sung-bin	1:41.38 (50.94 / 50.44)	(Latvia) Tomass Dukurs	1:41.56 (50.84 / 50.72)

=== Women ===
Event:	Gold:	Time	Silver:	Time	Bronze:	Time
(Germany) Altenberg	(United Kingdom) Laura Deas	1:57.84 (59.28 / 58.56)	(Germany) Tina Hermann	1:57.88 (59.21 / 58.67)	(Germany) Jacqueline Lölling	1:58.01 (59.32 / 58.69)
(Germany) Winterberg	(Germany) Tina Hermann	1:57.87 (58.45 / 59.42)	(Germany) Jacqueline Lölling	1:58.27 (58.69 / 59.58)	(Canada) Jane Channell	1:58.75 (59.21 / 59.54)
(Germany) Königssee	(Germany) Tina Hermann	1:43.04 (51.63 / 51.41)	(Germany) Jacqueline Lölling	1:44.17 (52.27 / 51.90)	(Switzerland) Marina Gilardoni	1:44.60 (52.33 / 52.27)
(United States) Lake Placid	(United States) Anne O'Shea	1:50.34 (55.26 / 55.08)	(Switzerland) Marina Gilardoni	1:50.43 (55.16 / 55.27)	(United Kingdom) Laura Deas	1:50.59 (55.16 / 55.43)
(United States) Park City	(Germany) Tina Hermann	1:41.08 (50.13 / 50.95)	(Canada) Jane Channell	1:41.49 (50.34 / 51.15)	(Austria) Janine Flock	1:41.58 (50.57 / 51.01)
(Canada) Whistler	(Germany) Tina Hermann	1:48.90 (54.57 / 54.33)	(United States) Anne O'Shea	1:49.09 (54.55 / 54.54)	(Germany) Jacqueline Lölling	1:49.48 (54.77 / 54.71)
(Switzerland) St. Moritz	(Austria) Janine Flock	2:22.49 (1:11.55 / 1:10.94)	(Germany) Tina Hermann	2:22.57 (1:11.52 / 1:11.05)	(Switzerland) Marina Gilardoni	2:22.58 (1:12.16 / 1:10.42)
(Germany) Königssee	(Germany) Tina Hermann	1:43.21 (51.72 / 51.49)	(Germany) Jacqueline Lölling	1:43.58 (51.86 / 51.72)	(Switzerland) Marina Gilardoni	1:44.08 (52.05 / 52.03)

== Standings ==
=== Men ===
Pos.	Racer	(Germany) ALT	(Germany) WIN	(Germany) KON1	(United States) LPL	(United States) PAC	(Canada) WHI	(Switzerland) STM	(Germany) KON2	Points
1	Martins Dukurs (LAT)	1	1	1	1	1	1	2	1	1785
2	Yun Sung-bin (KOR)	12	4	3	2	2	3	1	2	1575
3	Tomass Dukurs (LAT)	5	6	4	3	6	2	2	3	1548
4	Axel Jungk (GER)	4	2	6	4	3	9	8	4	1474
5	Dominic Parsons (GBR)	9	7	14	7	7	6	11	5	1264
6	Matthew Antoine (USA)	10	9	15	5	4	4	15	7	1240
7	Michael Zachrau (GER)	8	8	11	9	14	10	7	9	1184
8	Dave Greszczyszyn (CAN)	13	13	9	10	12	5	18	12	1056
9	Barrett Martineau (CAN)	15	17	12	12	8	8	15	10	1016
10	Mattia Gaspari (ITA)	16	15	10	8	9	–	14	11	904
11	Matthias Guggenberger (AUT)	11	16	8	13	10	11	20	–	860
12	Aleksandr Tretyakov (RUS)	2	2	2	–	–	–	5	–	814
13	Hiroatsu Takahashi (JPN)	19	12	24	15	16	16	13	22	719
14	Nikita Tregubov (RUS)	3	10	7	–	–	–	4	–	704
15	Lee Han-sin (KOR)	14	11	20	19	19	24	10	24	698
16	Nathan Crumpton (USA)	24	18	21	–	5	7	–	18	619
17	Marco Rohrer (SUI)	18	20	22	24	18	20	21	17	547
18	Christopher Grotheer (GER)	7	5	5	–	–	–	–	–	536
19	Pavel Kulikov (RUS)	6	14	13	–	–	–	12	–	536
20	Ronald Auderset (SUI)	20	21	18	22	22	22	19	24	497
21	Ander Mirambell (ESP)	22	21	24	18	23	25	22	21	451
22	Sergei Chudinov (RUS)	–	–	–	16	13	13	–	14	448
23	Alexander Mutovin (RUS)	–	–	–	14	11	19	–	13	442
24	Rhys Thornbury (NZL)	–	–	–	23	17	12	25	16	402
25	Anton Batuev (RUS)	–	–	–	11	15	18	–	19	394
26	Joseph Luke Cecchini (ITA)	–	25	23	21	24	16	26	26	365
27	Kilian von Schleinitz (GER)	–	–	–	–	–	–	6	6	352
28	Raphael Maier (AUT)	–	–	16	–	–	–	17	8	344
29	Kyle Brown (USA)	–	–	–	6	–	–	9	–	328
30	Alexander Auer (AUT)	–	–	–	20	21	14	–	22	298
31	John Farrow (AUS)	–	–	–	17	20	15	–	–	260
32	David Michael Swift (GBR)	21	21	17	–	–	–	24	–	257
33	Ed Smith (GBR)	17	19	19	–	–	–	–	–	236
34	Dean Timmings (AUS)	–	–	–	25	24	26	–	28	144
35	Dorin Velicu (ROU)	25	26	26	–	–	–	–	–	112
36	Jeremy Rice (GBR)	–	–	–	–	–	–	–	15	104
37	Rasmus Ottosson (SWE)	–	–	–	–	26	21	–	–	98
38	Florian Auer (AUT)	23	24	–	–	–	–	–	–	95
39	Jack Thomas (GBR)	–	–	–	–	–	–	–	20	68
40	Evan Neufeldt (CAN)	–	–	–	–	–	22	–	–	56
41	Kenny Howard (GBR)	–	–	–	–	–	–	23	–	50
42	Nicholas Timmings (AUS)	–	–	–	–	–	–	–	27	32

=== Women ===
Pos.	Racer	(Germany) ALT	(Germany) WIN	(Germany) KON1	(United States) LPL	(United States) PAC	(Canada) WHI	(Switzerland) STM	(Germany) KON2	Points
1	Tina Hermann (GER)	2	1	1	4	1	1	2	1	1737
2	Jacqueline Lölling (GER)	3	2	2	8	7	3	4	2	1550
3	Jane Channell (CAN)	7	3	6	6	2	4	9	11	1410
4	Anne O'Shea (USA)	12	11	8	1	4	2	6	6	1403
5	Marina Gilardoni (SUI)	14	8	3	2	12	6	3	3	1386
6	Janine Flock (AUT)	10	7	11	5	3	9	1	7	1377
7	Laura Deas (GBR)	1	4	10	3	10	8	5	20	1317
8	Sophia Griebel (GER)	4	5	5	15	8	5	13	5	1312
9	Elisabeth Vathje (CAN)	13	9	9	12	6	10	11	10	1152
10	Kim Meylemans (BEL)	9	10	7	11	8	17	19	8	1082
11	Kendall Wesenberg (USA)	18	12	14	9	5	16	8	9	1064
12	Donna Creighton (GBR)	11	14	15	10	14	12	15	19	914
13	Lelde Priedulēna (LAT)	5	6	4	–	–	–	10	4	888
14	Joska Le Conte (NED)	19	17	19	17	16	13	7	13	828
15	Jaclyn Narracott (AUS)	21	18	18	7	21	–	14	12	692
16	Carina Mair (AUT)	16	20	16	19	19	–	16	17	592
17	Micaela Widmer (SUI)	17	19	20	16	15	11	–	–	566
18	Elena Nikitina (RUS)	6	13	12	–	–	–	12	–	552
19	Olga Potylitsina (RUS)	–	–	–	14	13	7	–	16	496
20	Yulia Kanakina (RUS)	8	15	17	–	–	–	17	–	440
21	Maria Orlova (RUS)	14	16	13	–	–	–	18	–	408
22	Takako Oguchi (JPN)	–	–	–	13	17	18	–	14	400
23	Anastasia Shlapak (RUS)	–	–	–	18	11	15	–	21	382
24	Katie Tannenbaum (ISV)	–	–	22	21	20	20	20	22	378
25	Renata Khuzina (RUS)	–	–	–	20	18	14	–	18	340
26	Maria Marinela Mazilu (ROU)	20	21	21	–	–	–	–	–	192
27	Ashleigh Fay Pittaway (GBR)	–	–	–	–	–	–	–	15	104
28	Cassie Hawrysh (CAN)	–	–	–	–	–	19	–	–	74
