= FIBT World Championships 2015 – Men =

Men at the FIBT World Championships 2015
- Venue: Winterberg bobsleigh, luge, and skeleton track, Winterberg
- Date: 5–6 March 2015
- Competitors: 34 from 17 nations
- Winning time: 3:43.23

Medalists
gold medal	Martins Dukurs	Latvia
silver medal	Aleksandr Tretyakov	Russia
bronze medal	Tomass Dukurs	Latvia

FIBT World Championships 2015 /
Two	men		women
Four	men
Skeleton	men		women
Mixed		team

The men's event of the FIBT World Championships 2015 was held on 5–6 March 2015.

== Results ==
The first two runs were started on 5 March at 10:00, and the last two runs on 6 March at 14:30.

Rank	Bib	Athlete	Country	Run 1	Run 2	Run 3	Run 4	Total	Behind
1st place, gold medalist(s)	3	Martins Dukurs	Latvia	55.94	56.10	55.51	55.68	3:43.23	
2nd place, silver medalist(s)	5	Aleksandr Tretyakov	Russia	56.24	55.97	55.79	55.92	3:43.92	+0.69
3rd place, bronze medalist(s)	2	Tomass Dukurs	Latvia	56.45	56.28	55.92	56.10	3:44.75	+1.52
4	6	Nikita Tregubov	Russia	56.63	56.53	56.26	55.97	3:45.39	+2.16
5	9	Christopher Grotheer	Germany	56.66	56.28	56.42	56.17	3:45.53	+2.30
6	4	Axel Jungk	Germany	56.54	56.44	56.38	56.27	3:45.63	+2.40
7	7	Dominic Parsons	Great Britain	56.79	56.72	56.23	56.25	3:45.99	+2.76
8	8	Yun Sung-bin	South Korea	56.77	56.77	56.36	56.19	3:46.09	+2.86
9	13	Kilian von Schleinitz	Germany	56.72	56.79	56.51	56.26	3:46.28	+3.05
10	10	Sergey Chudinov	Russia	57.14	56.68	56.38	56.30	3:46.50	+3.27
11	11	Dave Greszczyszyn	Canada	56.71	56.76	56.57	56.57	3:46.61	+3.38
12	1	Matthew Antoine	United States	56.85	56.78	56.61	56.65	3:46.89	+3.66
13	14	Pavel Kulikov	Russia	56.96	56.68	56.78	56.74	3:47.23	+4.00
14	15	Hiroatsu Takahashi	Japan	57.11	56.86	56.80	56.61	3:47.38	+4.15
15	17	Kyle Tress	United States	57.13	56.85	56.88	56.59	3:47.45	+4.22
16	23	Martin Rosenberger	Germany	57.12	56.97	56.73	56.75	3:47.57	+4.34
17	28	Marco Rohrer	Switzerland	57.19	56.98	57.05	56.83	3:48.04	+4.81
18	16	Raphael Maier	Austria	57.32	57.14	56.93	56.83	3:48.22	+4.99
19	12	Matthias Guggenberger	Austria	57.32	57.10	56.95	57.01	3:48.38	+5.15
20	24	Barrett Martineau	Canada	57.28	57.10	57.27	57.07	3:48.72	+5.49
21	18	Mattia Gaspari	Italy	57.33	56.10	57.05			
22	19	David Swift	Great Britain	57.30	57.56	56.81			
23	21	Evan Neufeldt	Canada	57.53	57.29	57.03			
24	27	Lee Han-sin	South Korea	57.44	57.40	57.09			
25	26	Ronald Auderset	Switzerland	57.59	57.54	57.01			
26	20	Joseph Cecchini	Italy	57.60	57.54	57.19			
27	25	John Farrow	Australia	57.69	57.52	57.20			
28	29	Nicholas Timmings	Australia	57.35	57.48	57.76			
29	30	Dorin Dumitru Velicu	Romania	57.81	57.86	57.37			
30	31	Ander Mirambell	Spain	57.85	57.87	57.78			
31	32	Rhys Thornbury	New Zealand	57.76	57.95	57.93			
32	34	Marin Bangiev	Bulgaria	58.94	59.04	58.79			
33	33	Gustavo Henke	Brazil	59.93	1:01.27	58.60			
	22	Ed Smith	Great Britain	57.81	57.56	DNS			
