= IBSF World Championships 2017 – Men =

Men at the IBSF World Championships 2017
- Venue: Königssee bobsleigh, luge, and skeleton track
- Location: Königssee, Germany
- Dates: 24–26 February
- Competitors: 44 from 29 nations
- Winning time: 3:23.48

Medalists
gold medal	Martins Dukurs	Latvia
silver medal	Axel Jungk	Germany
bronze medal	Nikita Tregubov	Russia

The Men competition at the 2017 World Championships was held on 24 and 26 February 2017.

== Results ==
The first two runs were held on 24 February 2017 and the last two runs on 26 February 2017.

Rank	Bib	Athlete	Country	Run 1	Rank	Run 2	Rank	Run 3	Rank	Run 4	Rank	Total	Behind
1st place, gold medalist(s)	13	Martins Dukurs	Latvia	50.99	1	50.96	1	50.60	4	50.93	4	3:23.48	
2nd place, silver medalist(s)	8	Axel Jungk	Germany	51.68	5	51.13	2	50.50	3	50.54	1	3:23.85	+0.37
3rd place, bronze medalist(s)	15	Nikita Tregubov	Russia	51.42	2	51.29	3	50.41	1	50.90	3	3:24.02	+0.54
4	9	Aleksandr Tretyakov	Russia	51.50	4	51.35	4	50.41	1	50.95	5	3:24.21	+0.73
5	10	Alexander Gassner	Germany	51.45	3	51.47	5	50.78	5	50.75	2	3:24.45	+0.97
6	6	Christopher Grotheer	Germany	51.71	6	51.63	6	50.83	6	51.25	8	3:25.42	+1.94
7	7	Matthew Antoine	United States	51.77	7	52.03	9	51.07	8	51.23	7	3:26.10	+2.62
8	12	Dominic Parsons	Great Britain	52.05	9	51.83	7	51.15	9	51.18	6	3:26.21	+2.73
9	28	Mattia Gaspari	Italy	52.35	14	52.17	12	51.21	10	51.35	11	3:27.08	+3.60
10	25	Dave Greszczyszyn	Canada	52.22	10	52.16	11	51.50	15	51.30	10	3:27.18	+3.70
11	17	Rhys Thornbury	New Zealand	52.59	19	52.23	13	51.01	7	51.39	13	3:27.22	+3.74
12	14	Tomass Dukurs	Latvia	51.98	8	51.88	8	51.79	21	51.58	15	3:27.23	+3.75
13	16	Barrett Martineau	Canada	52.27	12	52.47	16	51.37	11	51.37	14	3:27.60	+4.12
14	23	Pavel Kulikov	Russia	52.44	15	52.38	15	51.40	12	51.49	16	3:27.81	+4.33
15	3	Matthias Guggenberger	Austria	52.55	18	52.14	10	51.48	13	51.91	19	3:28.08	+4.60
16	24	Jack Thomas	Great Britain	52.65	20	52.76	25	51.49	14	51.26	9	3:28.16	+4.68
17	22	John Daly	United States	52.45	16	52.61	20	51.73	19	51.38	12	3:28.17	+4.69
18	11	Nathan Crumpton	United States	52.29	13	52.52	18	51.75	20	51.97	20	3:28.53	+5.05
19	20	Jeremy Rice	Great Britain	52.52	17	52.33	14	51.91	23	51.91	17	3:28.61	+5.13
20	19	Ander Mirambell	Spain	52.25	11	52.57	19	52.04	25	51.86	18	3:28.72	+5.24
21	29	Geng Wenqiang	China	52.82	21	52.48	17	51.65	17	DNQ			
22	5	Kevin Boyer	Canada	52.94	23	52.61	20	51.60	16	DNQ			
23	21	Marco Rohrer	Switzerland	52.86	22	53.16	29	51.67	18	DNQ			
24	32	Vladyslav Heraskevych	Ukraine	53.10	29	52.91	27	51.81	22	DNQ			
25	2	Joseph Cecchini	Italy	52.95	25	52.71	24	52.21	30	DNQ			
26	18	Egor Veselov	Russia	52.96	26	52.69	22	52.38	32	DNQ			
27	31	Riet Graf	Switzerland	53.32	31	52.69	22	52.12	28	DNQ			
28	34	Rasmus Ottosson	Sweden	53.37	32	52.93	28	52.06	26	DNQ			
29	26	Alexander Auer	Austria	52.94	23	53.51	33	51.95	24	DNQ			
30	1	Dorin Dumitru Velicu	Romania	53.00	27	53.40	31	52.15	29	DNQ			
31	27	Hiroatsu Takahashi	Japan	53.55	33	53.18	30	52.09	27	DNQ			
32	30	Alex Hanssen	Norway	53.01	28	52.77	26	53.12	36	DNQ			
33	33	Lee Han-sin	South Korea	53.28	30	53.75	36	52.68	34	DNQ			
34	35	Philipp Mölter	Czech Republic	53.59	34	53.69	35	52.44	33	DNQ			
35	37	Adam Edelman	Israel	54.18	35	53.88	37	52.29	31	DNQ			
36	39	Brendan Doyle	Ireland	55.43	41	53.44	32	52.74	35	DNQ			
37	36	Dean Timmings	Australia	54.24	36	54.11	38	53.50	37	DNQ			
38	42	Anthony Watson	Jamaica	54.55	37	53.68	34	53.77	39	DNQ			
39	4	Chiang Chun-hung	Chinese Taipei	54.79	39	54.38	39	53.88	40	DNQ			
40	43	Michał Jakóbczyk	Poland	54.71	38	54.85	40	53.68	38	DNQ			
41	38	Jeff Bauer	Luxembourg	55.36	40	55.00	42	54.25	42	DNQ			
42	41	Marin Bangiev	Bulgaria	57.10	43	54.89	41	54.21	41	DNQ			
43	44	Denis Lorenčič	Slovenia	56.25	42	55.82	44	54.94	43	DNQ			
44	40	Akwasi Frimpong	Ghana	57.14	44	55.50	43	55.65	44	DNQ			
