= FIBT World Championships 2015 – Women =

Bobsleigh and skeleton world championships

Women at the FIBT World Championships 2015
- Venue: Winterberg bobsleigh, luge, and skeleton track, Winterberg
- Date: 6–7 March 2015
- Competitors: 29 from 18 nations
- Winning time: 3:49.95

Medalists
gold medal	Lizzy Yarnold	Great Britain
silver medal	Jacqueline Lölling	Germany
bronze medal	Elisabeth Vathje	Canada

FIBT World Championships 2015 /
Two	men		women
Four	men
Skeleton	men		women
Mixed		team

The Women event of the FIBT World Championships 2015 was held on 6–7 March 2015.

== Results ==
The first two runs were started on 6 March at 11:00 and the last two runs on 7 March at 10:00.

Rank	Bib	Athlete	Country	Run 1	Run 2	Run 3	Run 4	Total	Behind
1st place, gold medalist(s)	2	Lizzy Yarnold	Great Britain	57.44	57.62	57.47	57.42	3:49.95	
2nd place, silver medalist(s)	16	Jacqueline Lölling	Germany	57.64	57.81	57.67	57.50	3:50.62	+0.67
3rd place, bronze medalist(s)	9	Elisabeth Vathje	Canada	57.45	57.68	57.89	57.72	3:50.74	+0.79
4	12	Jane Channell	Canada	57.75	57.70	57.79	57.56	3:50.80	+0.85
5	4	Tina Hermann	Germany	57.74	57.84	57.58	57.68	3:50.84	+0.89
6	3	Janine Flock	Austria	58.15	58.02	57.56	57.77	3:51.50	+1.55
7	1	Laura Deas	Great Britain	58.16	57.96	57.75	57.66	3:51.53	+1.58
8	8	Marina Gilardoni	Switzerland	57.90	58.15	57.80	57.83	3:51.68	+1.73
9	7	Rose McGrandle	Great Britain	58.00	57.97	57.91	57.83	3:51.71	+1.76
10	11	Lanette Prediger	Canada	58.12	57.93	57.99	57.90	3:51.94	+1.99
11	10	Maria Orlova	Russia	58.17	58.18	58.06	57.71	3:52.12	+2.17
12	6	Sophia Griebel	Germany	58.04	58.05	58.11	58.05	3:52.25	+2.30
13	17	Lelde Priedulēna	Latvia	58.38	58.19	58.04	58.02	3:52.63	+2.68
14	5	Anja Huber	Germany	58.12	58.37	58.20	58.00	3:52.69	+2.74
15	14	Joska le Conte	Netherlands	58.46	58.29	58.27	58.34	3:53.36	+3.41
16	23	Jaclyn Narracott	Australia	58.48	58.44	58.21	58.41	3:53.54	+3.59
17	20	Micaela Widmer	Switzerland	58.55	58.33	58.30	58.49	3:53.67	+3.72
18	15	Anne O'Shea	United States	58.47	58.46	58.51	58.54	3:53.98	+4.03
19	24	Kim Meylemans	Belgium	58.37	58.70	58.45	58.56	3:54.08	+4.13
20	19	Maria Marinela Mazilu	Romania	58.39	58.66	58.55	58.76	3:54.36	+4.41
21	21	Megan Henry	United States	58.83	58.07	58.77			
22	18	Yulia Kanakina	Russia	58.81	58.57	58.75			
23	26	Maria Montejano	Spain	59.04	58.71	58.85			
24	22	Takako Omukai	Japan	59.38	58.75	58.64			
25	25	Katie Tannenbaum	United States Virgin Islands	59.74	59.71	59.34			
26	27	Camilla Bryer	Bulgaria	59.88	59.88	59.82			
27	28	Sara Lavrenčič	Slovenia	59.97	1:00.29	1:00.06			
28	29	Marta Orlowska	Poland	1:00.76	1:00.97	1:00.46			
	13	Elena Nikitina	Russia	DNF					
