= Skeleton at the 2018 Winter Olympics – Men's =

Men's Skeleton at the XXIII Olympic Winter Games
- Venue: Alpensia Sliding Centre, Pyeongchang, South Korea
- Dates: 15–16 February 2018
- Competitors: 30 from 20 nations

Medalists
1st place, gold medalist(s)		Yun Sung-bin	South Korea
2nd place, silver medalist(s)		Nikita Tregubov	Olympic Athletes from Russia
3rd place, bronze medalist(s)		Dominic Parsons	Great Britain

The men's skeleton event at the 2018 Winter Olympics took place on 15 and 16 February at the Alpensia Sliding Centre near Pyeongchang, South Korea.

In the victory ceremony, the medals were presented by Ryu Seung-min, member of the International Olympic Committee, accompanied by Ivo Ferriani, International Bobsleigh and Skeleton Federation president and member of the International Olympic Committee.

== Qualification ==
30 athletes qualified. Qualification is based on the combined rankings (across all four tours) as of 14 January 2018. The top three countries received three quotas each, the next six received two each and the last nine one each. Men had to be ranked in the top 60, after eliminating non-quota-earning competitors from countries that have earned their maximum quota. Ghana was awarded the continental quota for Africa. Competitors must compete in five races on three tracks during the 2016/17 season or 2017/18 season.

== Results ==
The first two runs were held on 15 February and the last two on 16 February 2018.

TR – Track Record (in italics for previous marks). Top finish in each run is in boldface.

Rank	Bib	Athlete	Country	Run 1	Rank 1	Run 2	Rank 2	Run 3	Rank 3	Run 4	Rank 4	Total	Behind
1st place, gold medalist(s)	6	Yun Sung-bin	South Korea	**50.28** TR	1	**50.07** TR	1	**50.18**	1	**50.02** TR	1	3:20.55	–
2nd place, silver medalist(s)	10	Nikita Tregubov	Olympic Athletes from Russia	50.59	2	50.50	4	50.53	5	50.56	2	3:22.18	+1.63
3rd place, bronze medalist(s)	16	Dominic Parsons	Great Britain	50.85	5	50.41	3	50.33	3	50.61	3	3:22.20	+1.65
4	9	Martins Dukurs	Latvia	50.85	5	50.38	2	50.32	2	50.76	5	3:22.31	+1.76
5	8	Tomass Dukurs	Latvia	50.88	7	50.58	5	50.65	6	50.63	4	3:22.74	+2.19
6	23	Kim Ji-soo	South Korea	50.80	4	50.86	6	50.51	4	50.81	6	3:22.98	+2.43
7	7	Axel Jungk	Germany	50.77	3	51.01	9	50.83	8	50.99	10	3:23.60	+3.05
8	11	Christopher Grotheer	Germany	51.05	9	51.06	11	51.01	10	50.93	8	3:24.05	+3.50
9	12	Alexander Gassner	Germany	51.05	9	51.08	12	51.04	11	50.93	8	3:24.10	+3.55
10	21	Jerry Rice	Great Britain	51.06	11	51.15	13	51.04	11	50.99	10	3:24.24	+3.69
11	13	Matthew Antoine	United States	51.16	12	50.98	8	50.91	9	51.34	14	3:24.39	+3.84
12	26	Vladyslav Heraskevych	Ukraine	51.26	14	51.16	15	51.21	17	50.85	7	3:24.47	+3.92
13	24	Geng Wenqiang	China	51.51	19	50.87	7	51.18	15	51.09	12	3:24.65	+4.10
14	20	Rhys Thornbury	New Zealand	50.90	8	51.03	10	50.65	6	52.14	20	3:24.72	+4.17
15	17	Vladislav Marchenkov	Olympic Athletes from Russia	51.27	15	51.49	20	51.05	13	51.37	15	3:25.18	+4.63
16	18	John Daly	United States	51.23	13	51.15	14	51.33	18	51.65	19	3:25.35	+4.80
17	19	Kevin Boyer	Canada	51.46	18	51.24	16	51.14	14	51.56	17	3:25.40	+4.85
18	14	Matthias Guggenberger	Austria	51.38	16	51.29	17	51.81	25	51.25	13	3:25.73	+5.18
19	27	John Farrow	Australia	51.64	21	51.31	18	51.40	20	51.53	16	3:25.88	+5.33
20	3	Alexander Henning Hanssen	Norway	51.44	17	51.51	22	51.37	19	51.57	18	3:25.89	+5.34
21	15	Dave Greszczyszyn	Canada	51.73	23	51.31	18	51.57	21	did not advance		2:34.61	N/A
22	25	Hiroatsu Takahashi	Japan	52.00	27	51.50	21	51.19	16	did not advance		2:34.69	N/A
23	4	Ander Mirambell	Spain	51.64	21	52.06	26	51.59	22	did not advance		2:35.29	N/A
24	22	Barrett Martineau	Canada	51.94	26	51.76	24	51.70	23	did not advance		2:35.40	N/A
25	2	Dorin Dumitru Velicu	Romania	51.91	25	51.51	23	52.02	27	did not advance		2:35.44	N/A
26	28	Katsuyuki Miyajima	Japan	51.63	20	52.15	27	51.80	24	did not advance		2:35.58	N/A
27	29	Joseph Luke Cecchini	Italy	51.88	24	51.80	25	51.96	26	did not advance		2:35.64	N/A
28	30	Adam Edelman	Israel	52.48	28	52.43	28	52.35	28	did not advance		2:37.26	N/A
29	1	Anthony Watson	Jamaica	53.13	29	54.04	29	53.35	29	did not advance		2:40.52	N/A
30	5	Akwasi Frimpong	Ghana	53.97	30	54.46	30	53.69	30	did not advance		2:42.12	N/A

TR – Track Record
