= Skeleton at the 2014 Winter Olympics – Men's =

Men's Skeleton at the XXII Olympic Winter Games
- Venue: Sliding Center Sanki
- Dates: 14–15 February 2014
- Competitors: 27 from 16 nations
- Winning time: 3:44.29

Medalists
1st place, gold medalist(s)		Aleksandr Tretyakov	Russia
2nd place, silver medalist(s)		Martins Dukurs	Latvia
3rd place, bronze medalist(s)		Matthew Antoine	United States

The men's skeleton event at the 2014 Winter Olympics took place at the Sliding Center Sanki on 14–15 February.

The gold medal won in this event featured Chelyabinsk meteor fragments to commemorate the first anniversary of this meteor strike.

== Competition ==
In the first run, Aleksandr Tretyakov established the track record (55.95) and the start record (4.47).

== Results ==
TR – Track Record. Top finish in each run is in boldface.

On 22 November 2017, gold medalist Aleksandr Tretyakov was stripped of his gold medal. On 27 November 2017, the results by Sergey Chudinov were annulled as well. On 1 February 2018, their results were restored as a result of the decision of CAS

Rank	Bib	Athlete	Country	Run 1	Run 2	Run 3	Run 4	Total	Behind
1st place, gold medalist(s)	5	Aleksandr Tretyakov	Russia	**55.95** TR	**56.04**	56.28	**56.02**	3:44.29	
2nd place, silver medalist(s)	3	Martins Dukurs	Latvia	56.18	56.37	**56.26**	56.29	3:45.10	+0.81
3rd place, bronze medalist(s)	2	Matthew Antoine	United States	56.89	56.95	56.69	56.73	3:47.26	+2.97
4	4	Tomass Dukurs	Latvia	57.03	57.06	56.75	56.74	3:47.58	+3.29
5	8	Sergey Chudinov	Russia	56.98	57.04	56.86	56.71	3:47.59	+3.30
6	17	Nikita Tregubov	Russia	57.44	56.96	56.57	56.65	3:47.62	+3.33
7	6	John Fairbairn	Canada	57.34	56.92	56.91	56.96	3:48.13	+3.84
8	11	Kristan Bromley	Great Britain	57.24	57.02	57.17	56.74	3:48.17	+3.88
9	7	Alexander Kröckel	Germany	57.21	57.36	57.03	56.69	3:48.29	+4.00
10	13	Dominic Parsons	Great Britain	57.23	57.17	57.00	56.96	3:48.36	+4.07
11	1	Frank Rommel	Germany	57.19	56.95	57.33	57.00	3:48.47	+4.18
12	10	Hiroatsu Takahashi	Japan	57.53	57.10	57.13	56.98	3:48.74	+4.45
13	14	Eric Neilson	Canada	57.41	57.01	57.25	57.10	3:48.77	+4.48
14	16	Matthias Guggenberger	Austria	57.70	57.12	57.24	56.94	3:49.00	+4.71
15	9	John Daly	United States	56.91	56.67	56.99	58.54	3:49.11	+4.82
16	18	Yun Sungbin	South Korea	57.54	57.02	57.90	57.11	3:49.57	+5.28
17	23	John Farrow	Australia	57.84	57.73	57.75	57.35	3:50.67	+6.38
18	20	Maurizio Oioli	Italy	57.69	57.27	57.85	57.87	3:50.68	+6.39
19	15	Raphael Maier	Austria	57.83	57.51	57.95	57.57	3:50.86	+6.57
20	26	Ben Sandford	New Zealand	58.00	57.75	57.79	57.67	3:51.21	+6.92
21	12	Kyle Tress	United States	57.85	58.13	57.76		2:53.74	
22	19	Yuki Sasahara	Japan	58.22	58.07	57.91		2:54.20	
23	22	Alexandros Kefalas	Greece	58.20	58.33	58.22		2:54.75	
24	24	Lee Hansin	South Korea	58.41	58.12	58.64		2:55.17	
25	27	Dorin Dumitru Velicu	Romania	58.72	58.44	58.91		2:56.07	
26	25	Ander Mirambell	Spain	58.58	58.72	58.80		2:56.10	
27	21	Sean Greenwood	Ireland	57.99	65.11	58.22		3:01.32	
