= FIBT World Championships 2015 – Mixed team =

Mixed team at the FIBT World Championships 2015
- Venue: Winterberg bobsleigh, luge, and skeleton track, Winterberg
- Date: 1 March 2015
- Competitors: 60 from 10 nations
- Winning time: 3:48.83

Medalists
gold medal	Axel Jungk; Cathleen Martini; Lisette Thöne; Tina Hermann; Francesco Friedrich; Martin Grothkopp	Germany
silver medal	Christopher Grotheer; Anja Schneiderheinze-Stöckel; Franziska Bertels; Anja Selbach; Johannes Lochner; Gregor Bermbach	Germany
bronze medal	Dave Greszczyszyn; Kaillie Humphries; Kate O'Brien; Elisabeth Vathje; Justin Kripps; Alexander Kopacz	Canada

The mixed team event of the FIBT World Championships 2015 was held on 1 March 2015.

First introduced at the 2007 championships, the mixed team event consists of one run each of men's skeleton, women's skeleton, 2-man bobsleigh, and 2-women bobsleigh.

== Results ==
The race was started at 13:00.

Rank	Bib	Country	Athletes	Run 1	Run 2	Run 3	Run 4	Total	Behind
1st place, gold medalist(s)	1	Germany	Axel Jungk; Cathleen Martini / Lisette Thöne; Tina Hermann; Francesco Friedrich / Martin Grothkopp	57.13	57.21	58.56	55.93	3:48.83	
2nd place, silver medalist(s)	4	Germany	Christopher Grotheer; Anja Schneiderheinze-Stöckel / Franziska Bertels; Anja Selbach; Johannes Lochner / Gregor Bermbach	57.10	57.19	59.24	55.74	3:49.27	+0.44
3rd place, bronze medalist(s)	5	Canada	Dave Greszczyszyn; Kaillie Humphries / Kate O'Brien; Elisabeth Vathje; Justin Kripps / Alexander Kopacz	57.65	57.61	58.85	55.90	3:50.01	+1.18
4	9	United States	Matthew Antoine; Elana Meyers / Cherrelle Garrett; Annie O'Shea; Steven Holcomb / Adam Clark	57.44	57.19	59.62	56.11	3:50.36	+1.53
5	2	Austria	Matthias Guggenberger; Christina Hengster / Sanne Dekker; Janine Flock; Benjamin Maier / Markus Sammer	57.97	57.82	58.44	56.39	3:50.62	+1.79
6	6	United States	Kyle Tress; Jamie Greubel / Lauren Gibbs; Megan Henry; Nick Cunningham / James Reed	57.93	57.53	59.74	55.90	3:51.10	+2.27
7	8	Great Britain	Dominic Parsons; Victoria Olaoye / Lucy Onyeforo; Laura Deas; Lamin Deen / Simeon Williamson	57.40	58.88	59.14	56.48	3:51.90	+3.07
8	3	Romania	Dorin Dumitru Velicu; Maria Constantin / Andreea Grecu; Maria Marinela Mazilu; Dorin Grigore / Florin Cezar Crăciun	58.00	57.81	59.54	56.73	3:52.08	+3.25
9	7	Russia	Sergei Chudinov; Nadezhda Sergeeva / Yulia Shokshueva; Yulia Kanakina; Alexey Stulnev / Vasiliy Kondratenko	59.58	58.03	59.86	55.96	3:53.43	+4.60
DSQ	10	Russia	Aleksandr Tretyakov; Alexandra Rodionova / Nadezhda Paleeva; Maria Orlova; Alexander Kasjanov / Ilvir Huzin	~~56.78~~	~~57.53~~	~~59.02~~	~~56.03~~	~~3:49.36~~	~~+0.53~~
