= 2018–19 Skeleton World Cup =

Winners
- Men's: Alexander Tretiakov (RUS)
- Women's: Elena Nikitina (RUS)

Competitions
- Venues: 7 (8 events)

The 2018–19 Skeleton World Cup was a multi-race series over a season for skeleton. The season started on 3 December 2018 in Sigulda, Latvia, and finished on 23 February 2019 in Calgary, Alberta, Canada. The World Cup was organised by the International Bobsleigh and Skeleton Federation, who also run World Cups and Championships in bobsleigh. The title sponsor of the World Cup was again BMW.

== Calendar ==
Anticipated schedule as announced by the IBSF:

Venue	Date	Details
(Latvia) Sigulda	8–9 December	
(Germany) Winterberg	14 December	
(Germany) Altenberg	4 January	
(Germany) Königssee	11 January	cancelled due to continued snowfall; rescheduled to Calgary on 22 February
(Austria) Igls	18 January	also European Championships
(Switzerland) St. Moritz	25 January	
(United States) Lake Placid	15–16 February	
(Canada) Calgary	22 February	rescheduled from Königssee
(Canada) Calgary	23–24 February	
(Canada) Whistler	3-9 March	World Championships

== Results ==
=== Men ===
Event:	Gold:	Time	Silver:	Time	Bronze:	Time
(Latvia) Sigulda	Nikita Tregubov; Russia	1:41.87 (50.81 / 51.06)	Martins Dukurs; Latvia	1:42.24 (51.17 / 51.07)	Yun Sung-bin; South Korea	1:42.40 (51.22 / 51.18)
(Germany) Winterberg	Alexander Tretiakov; Russia	1:52.07 (56.11 / 55.96)	Axel Jungk; Germany	1:52.90 (56.69 / 56.21)	Yun Sung-bin; South Korea	1:52.91 (56.55 / 56.36)
(Germany) Altenberg	Alexander Tretiakov; Russia	1:55.09 (57.09 / 58.00)	Yun Sung-bin; South Korea	1:55.66 (57.58 / 58.08)	Nikita Tregubov; Russia	1:55.93 (57.64 / 58.29)
(Germany) Königssee	cancelled due to continued snowfall; rescheduled to Calgary on 22 February					
(Austria) Igls	Martins Dukurs; Latvia	1:46.17 (53.02 / 53.15)	Yun Sung-bin; South Korea	1:46.45 (53.24 / 53.21)	Axel Jungk; Germany	1:46.46 (53.24 / 53.22)
(Switzerland) St. Moritz	Yun Sung-bin; South Korea	2:15.96 (1:08.20 / 1:07.76)	Alexander Tretiakov; Russia	2:16.16 (1:08.53 / 1:07.63)	Nikita Tregubov; Russia	2:16.23 (1:08.50 / 1:07.73)
(United States) Lake Placid	Alexander Tretiakov; Russia	1:47.19 (53.47 / 53.72)	Martins Dukurs; Latvia	1:47.33 (53.58 / 53.75)	Yun Sung-bin; South Korea	1:47.44 (53.71 / 53.73)
(Canada) Calgary 1	Alexander Tretiakov; Russia	1:51.35 (55.85 / 55.50)	Yun Sung-bin; South Korea	1:51.48 (56.08 / 55.40)	Martins Dukurs; Latvia	1:51.51 (55.89 / 55.62)
(Canada) Calgary 2	Yun Sung-bin; South Korea	1:52.70 (56.30 / 56.40)	Alexander Tretiakov; Russia	1:52.76 (56.40 / 56.36)	Tomass Dukurs; Latvia	1:53.21 (56.87 / 56.34)

=== Women ===
Event:	Gold:	Time	Silver:	Time	Bronze:	Time
(Latvia) Sigulda	Elena Nikitina; Russia	1:45.12 (52.51 / 52.69)	Elisabeth Maier; Canada	1:45.42 (52.83 / 52.59)	Tina Hermann; Germany	1:45.60 (52.77 / 52.83)
(Germany) Winterberg	Jacqueline Lölling; Germany	1:55.16 (57.61 / 57.55)	Tina Hermann; Germany	1:55.83 (57.96 / 57.87)	Janine Flock; Austria	1:55.86 (57.97 / 57.89)
(Germany) Altenberg	Elena Nikitina; Russia	1:57.42 (58.59 / 58.83)	Jacqueline Lölling; Germany	1:57.79 (58.74 / 59.05)	Yulia Kanakina; Russia	1:58.39 (58.19 / 59.20)
(Germany) Königssee	cancelled due to continued snowfall; rescheduled to Calgary on 22 February					
(Austria) Igls	Janine Flock; Austria	1:48.64 (54.34 / 54.30)	Elena Nikitina; Russia	1:49.07 (54.43 / 54.64)	Jacqueline Lölling; Germany	1:49.09 (54.53 / 54.56)
(Switzerland) St. Moritz	Mirela Rahneva; Canada	2:17.77 (1:09.22 / 1:08.55)	Elena Nikitina; Russia	2:18.00 (1:09.11 / 1:08.89)	Jacqueline Lölling; Germany	2:18.63 (1:09.56 / 1:09.07)
(United States) Lake Placid	Jacqueline Lölling; Germany	1:50.59 (55.07 / 55.52)	none awarded		Kendall Wesenberg; United States	1:51.10 (55.15 / 55.95)
(United States) Lake Placid	Elena Nikitina; Russia	1:50.59 (54.87 / 55.72)	none awarded		Kendall Wesenberg; United States	1:51.10 (55.15 / 55.95)
(Canada) Calgary 1	Mirela Rahneva; Canada	1:54.52 (57.38 / 57.14)	Tina Hermann; Germany	1:54.98 (57.74 / 57.24)	Elisabeth Maier; Canada	1:55.20 (57.75 / 57.45)
(Canada) Calgary 2	Tina Hermann; Germany	1:57.39 (58.97 / 58.42)	Mirela Rahneva; Canada	1:57.52 (58.94 / 58.58)	Laura Deas; Great Britain	1:57.68 (59.26 / 58.42)

== Standings ==
=== Men ===
Pos.	Racer	(Latvia) SIG	(Germany) WIN	(Germany) ALT	(Austria) IGL	(Switzerland) STM	(United States) LPL	(Canada) CGR 1	(Canada) CGR 2	Points
1	Alexander Tretiakov (RUS)	4	1	1	4	2	1	1	2	1704
2	Yun Sung-bin (KOR)	3	3	2	2	1	3	2	1	1680
3	Martins Dukurs (LAT)	2	7	7	1	8	2	3	4	1533
4	Nikita Tregubov (RUS)	1	4	3	9	3	4	5	8	1505
5	Axel Jungk (GER)	8	2	5	3	5	5	7	7	1458
6	Marcus Wyatt (GBR)	12	10	8	6	7	7	8	5	1288
7	Tomass Dukurs (LAT)	6	5	10	5	4	–	4	3	1272
8	Dave Greszczyszyn (CAN)	15	21	11	21	11	15	6	6	956
9	Vladyslav Heraskevych (UKR)	9	17	14	22	12	12	12	9	944
10	Florian Auer (AUT)	10	12	12	11	9	24	16	15	933

=== Women ===
Pos.	Racer	(Latvia) SIG	(Germany) WIN	(Germany) ALT	(Austria) IGL	(Switzerland) STM	(United States) LPL	(Canada) CGR 1	(Canada) CGR 2	Points
1	Elena Nikitina (RUS)	1	4	1	2	2	1	4	5	1663
2	Tina Hermann (GER)	3	2	4	4	4	6	2	1	1597
3	Mirela Rahneva (CAN)	12	5	14	13	1	4	1	2	1396
4	Sophia Griebel (GER)	6	6	5	9	5	5	9	9	1360
5	Jacqueline Lölling (GER)	5	1	2	3	3	1	–	–	1244
6	Kendall Wesenberg (USA)	11	15	9	12	7	3	8	9	1200
7	Yulia Kanakina (RUS)	7	8	3	7	–	7	14	6	1152
8	Elisabeth Maier (CAN)	2	12	11	6	15	–	3	4	1146
9	Jane Channell (CAN)	4	11	19	15	13	10	5	7	1122
10	Renata Khuzina (RUS)	8	17	10	14	16	8	12	8	1048

== Medal table ==
Rank	Nation	Gold	Silver	Bronze	Total
1	Russia	8	4	3	15
2	Germany	3	4	4	11
3	South Korea	2	3	3	8
4	Canada	2	2	1	5
5	Latvia	1	2	2	5
6	Austria	1	0	1	2
7	Great Britain	0	0	1	1
7	United States	0	0	1	1
Totals (8 entries)		17	15	16	48
