= Skeleton at the 2018 Winter Olympics =

Skeleton at the XXIII Olympic Winter Games
- Skeleton pictogram at the 2018 Winter Olympics
- Venue: Alpensia Sliding Centre
- Dates: 15–17 February 2018
- No. of events: 2 (1 men, 1 women)
- Competitors: 50 from 24 nations

Skeleton at the 2018 Winter Olympics was held at the Alpensia Sliding Centre near Pyeongchang, South Korea. The events were scheduled to take place between 15 and 17 February 2018. A total of two skeleton events were held, one each for men and women.

== Qualification ==
A total of 50 quota spots were available to athletes to compete at the games. A maximum 30 men and 20 women could qualify. The qualification was based on 3 successive iterations of the world rankings of 14 January 2018.

== Competition schedule ==
The following was the competition schedule for the two skeleton events.

All times are (UTC+9).

Date	Time	Event
15 February	10:00	Men's singles runs 1 and 2
16 February	09:30	Men's singles runs 3 and 4
16 February	20:20	Women's singles runs 1 and 2
17 February	20:20	Women's singles runs 3 and 4

== Medal summary ==
=== Medal table ===
* Host nation (South Korea)

Rank	Nation	Gold	Silver	Bronze	Total
1	Great Britain	1	0	2	3
2	South Korea*	1	0	0	1
3	Germany	0	1	0	1
3	Olympic Athletes from Russia	0	1	0	1
Totals (4 entries)		2	2	2	6

=== Events ===
Event	Gold		Silver		Bronze	
Men's	Yun Sung-bin; South Korea	3.20.55	Nikita Tregubov; Olympic Athletes from Russia	3.22.18	Dominic Parsons; Great Britain	3.22.20
Women's	Lizzy Yarnold; Great Britain	3:27.28	Jacqueline Lölling; Germany	3:27.73	Laura Deas; Great Britain	3:27.90

== Participating nations ==
A total of 50 athletes from 24 nations (including the IOC's designation of Olympic Athletes from Russia) participated. Eight nations made their Winter Olympics debut in the sport: Belgium, China, Ghana, Jamaica, Netherlands, Israel, Nigeria and Ukraine.

- Australia (2 athletes)
- Austria (2)
- Belgium (1)
- Canada (6)
- China (1)
- Germany (6)
- Ghana (1)
- Great Britain (4)
- Israel (1)
- Italy (1)
- Jamaica (1)
- Japan (3)
- Latvia (3)
- Netherlands (1)
- New Zealand (1)
- Nigeria (1)
- Norway (1)
- Olympic Athletes from Russia (2)
- Romania (2)
- South Korea (3)
- Spain (1)
- Switzerland (1)
- Ukraine (1)
- United States (4)
