= Narracott =

Narracott is a surname. Notable people and characters with the surname include:

- Fred Narracott, character in Agatha Christie's And Then There Were None
- Jaclyn Narracott (born 1990), Australian skeleton racer
- Paul Narracott (born 1959), Australian sprinter
