= Tina Hermann =

German skeleton racer

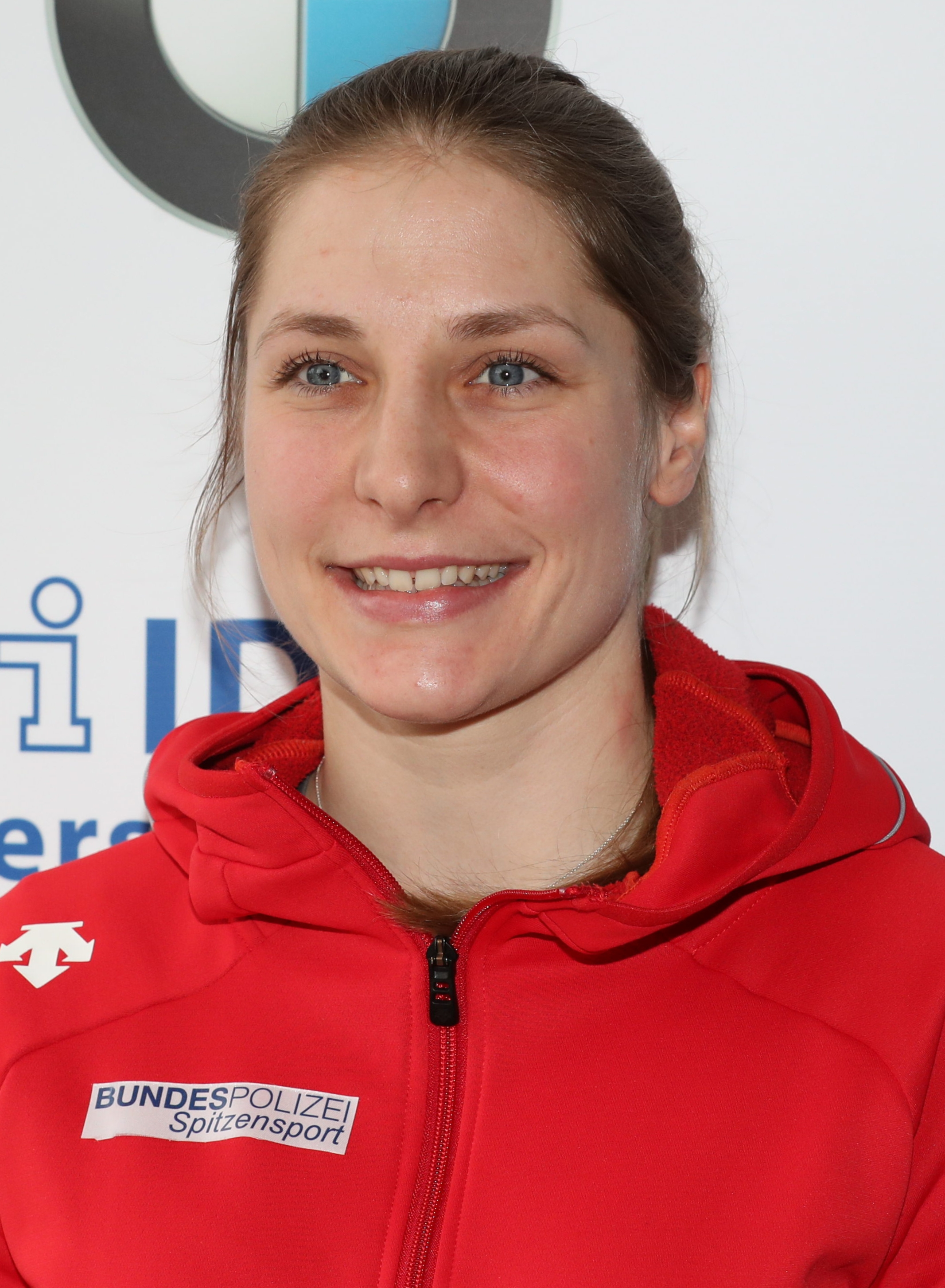
- Hermann in 2020

Personal information
- Nationality: German
- Born: 5 March 1992 (age 34) Cologne, Germany
- Height: 1.69 m (5 ft 7 in)
- Weight: 60 kg (132 lb)

Sport
- Country: Germany
- Sport: Skeleton
- Club: WSV Königssee
- Turned pro: 2007
- Coached by: Dirk Matschenz, Jens Müller
- Retired: 2024

Achievements and titles
- Olympic finals: 5th (Pyeongchang 2018)
- Highest world ranking: 1st in Skeleton World Cup (2015–16)
Medal record
Women's skeleton
Representing Germany
World Championships
Gold medal – first place	2015 Winterberg	Mixed team
Gold medal – first place	2016 Igls	Women
Gold medal – first place	2016 Igls	Mixed team
Gold medal – first place	2019 Whistler	Women
Gold medal – first place	2020 Altenberg	Women
Gold medal – first place	2021 Altenberg	Women
Gold medal – first place	2021 Altenberg	Mixed team
Silver medal – second place	2017 Königssee	Women
Silver medal – second place	2017 Königssee	Mixed team
Junior World Championships
Gold medal – first place	2010 St. Moritz	Women
European Championships
Gold medal – first place	2023 Altenberg	Women
Silver medal – second place	2016 St. Moritz	Women
Silver medal – second place	2021 Winterberg	Women
Bronze medal – third place	2017 Winterberg	Women
World Cup
Event	1st	2nd	3rd
Men	19	13	7
Total	19	13	7
- Updated on 21 March 2024

Tina Hermann (born 5 March 1992) is a retired German skeleton racer and a record four-time World champion. She began racing in 2007 and was selected to the national team in 2009. She is coached by Dirk Matschenz (personal) and Jens Müller (national); away from the track, she is a police officer.

== Notable results ==
Hermann's first competition on the Europe Cup circuit was at Winterberg in the 2008–09 season, where she finished seventh. Hermann won the Junior World Championships in the 2009–10 season at St. Moritz, but did not record a victory on the Europe Cup until 2011–12 at Altenberg. She began racing on the Intercontinental Cup circuit in 2012–13 and had her first ICC gold that season, also in Altenberg. After a second season on the ICC, Hermann was promoted to the World Cup squad for the 2014–15 season, during which she never finished lower than sixth place.

Hermann has finished every World Cup season top-three in the overall rankings: third in 2014–15, first in 2015–16, and second in 2016–17. In her Crystal Globe-winning 2015–16 season, Hermann took home five golds (at Winterberg, Park City, Whistler, and twice at Königssee) and two silvers (at Altenberg and St. Moritz), with only one result off the podium (fourth in Lake Placid). She had one gold in the 2016–17 season, at Igls.

In European Championships, Hermann placed second in 2015–16 at St. Moritz and third in 2016–17 at Winterberg. Her first podium at the World Championships was in the mixed team event at Winterberg in 2015, where individually she finished fifth. She was again on a gold medal-winning squad in the mixed team at Igls the following year, where she also won the individual gold. At the 2017 World Championships in Königssee, Hermann earned silvers in both disciplines.

In October 2024, Hermann announced her retirement from her career at the age of 32. She explained her withdrawal from active skeleton sport partly due to health issues with her hip and back, which had limited her. She no longer felt motivated to continue until the 2026 Winter Olympics, as the effort had been immense.

== World Cup results ==
All results are sourced from the International Bobsleigh and Skeleton Federation (IBSF).

Season	1	2	3	4	5	6	7	8	Points	Place
2014–15	4	3	4	6	5	5	5	5	1496	3rd
2015–16	2	1	1	4	1	1	2	1	1737	1st
2016–17	3	10	2	5	7	2	1	9	1493	2nd
2017–18	10	2	3	5	11	2	2	2	1504	2nd
2018–19	3	2	4	4	4	6	1	2	1597	2nd
2019–20	3	6	1	5	5	1	1	15	1523	4th
2020–21	7	3	3	4	2	1	10	6	1515	2nd
2021–22	8	12	1	2	1	6	7	10	1436	4th
2022–23	6	2	1	4	1	1	10	1	1622	1st
2023–24	1	9	11	5	14	15	1	15	1242	5th
