= Nadezhda Paleeva =

Russian bobsledder (born 1985)

Personal information
- Nationality: Russian
- Born: 24 September 1985 (age 40) Omsk, Russian SSR, Soviet Union
- Height: 1.78 m (5 ft 10 in)
- Weight: 70 kg (154 lb)

Sport
- Country: Russia
- Sport: Bobsleigh
Medal record
World Championships
Disqualified	2015 Winterberg	Mixed team

Nadezhda Paleeva (Russian: Надежда Палеева, also transliterated Paleyeva, born 24 September 1985) is a Russian bobsledder.

Paleeva competed at the 2014 Winter Olympics for Russia. She teamed with Nadezhda Sergeeva as the Russia-2 sled in the two-woman event, finishing 16th.

Paleeva made her World Cup debut in December 2013. As of April 2014, her best World Cup finish is 6th, at Igls in 2013-14.
