= Elisabeth Maier =

Canadian former skeleton bobsleigh racer

Elisabeth Vathje
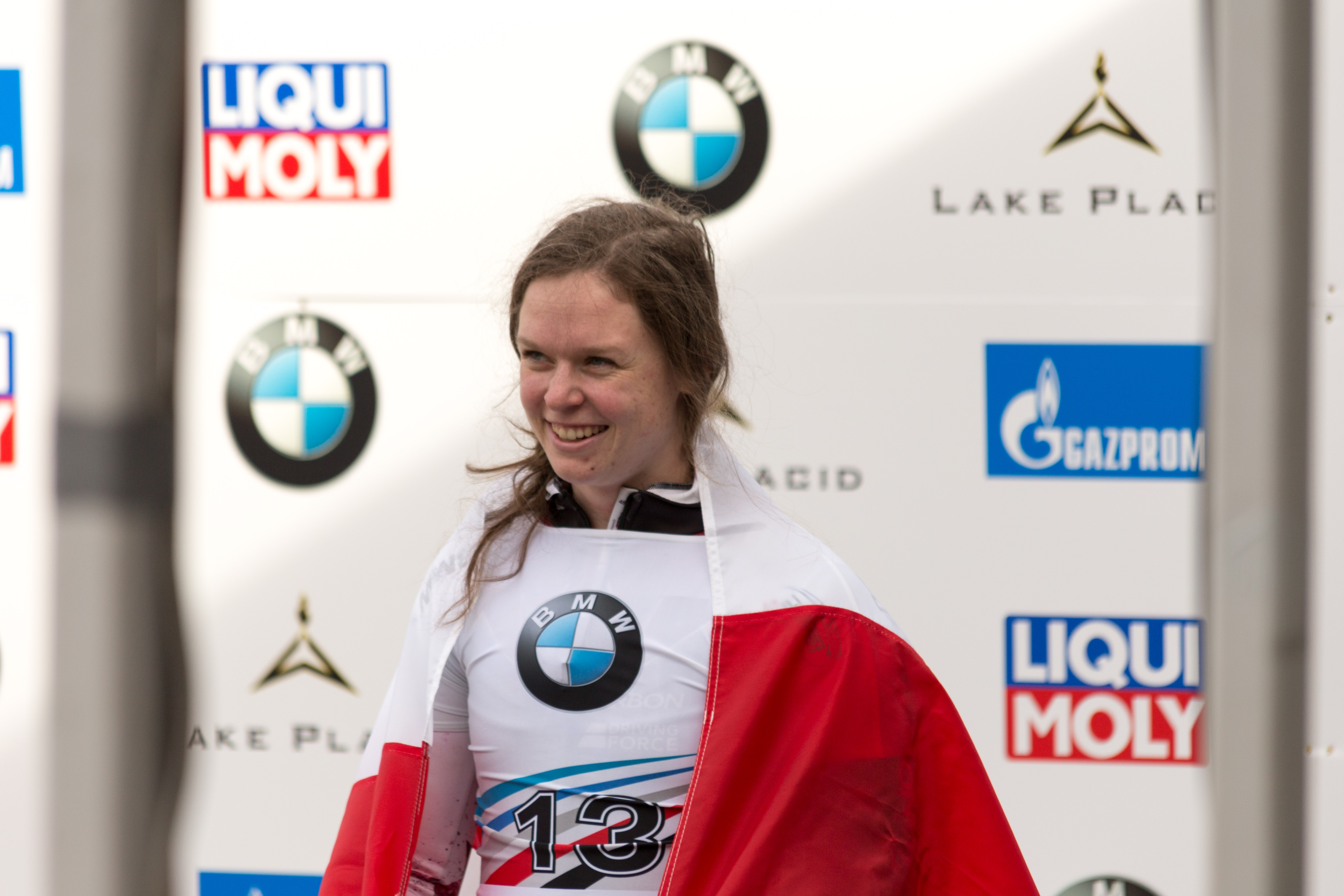
- At the 2017/2018 World Cup race in Lake Placid

Personal information
- Born: March 17, 1994 (age 32) Calgary, Alberta, Canada
- Height: 1.73 m (5 ft 8 in)
- Weight: 72 kg (159 lb)
- Website: www.globalsportsdirector.com

Sport
- Country: Canada
- Sport: Skeleton

Achievements and titles
- Olympic finals: 9th (Pyeongchang 2018)
Medal record
Women's skeleton
Representing Canada
World Championships
Bronze medal – third place	2015 Winterberg	Women
Bronze medal – third place	2015 Winterberg	Mixed team
Junior World Championships
Silver medal – second place	2014 Winterberg	Women
World Cup
Gold medal – first place	2014–15 Calgary	Women
Gold medal – first place	2015–16 Whistler	Women
Gold medal – first place	2016–17 Winterberg	Women
Silver medal – second place	2014–15 Lake Placid	Women
Silver medal – second place	2014–15 Igls	Women
Silver medal – second place	2014–15 St. Moritz	Women
Silver medal – second place	2017–18 Lake Placid	Women
Silver medal – second place	2017–18 Winterberg	Women
Silver medal – second place	2017–18 Igls	Women
Bronze medal – third place	2017–18 St. Moritz	Women
Third place	2017–18 overall	Women

Elisabeth Vathje (born March 17, 1994, in Calgary, Alberta) is a Canadian retired skeleton racer. In 2008, she was encouraged to try sliding sports by her father, who had shared an airplane trip with members of the Canadian luge team, but as a 14-year-old, she was too young to train bobsleigh, so she tried out for skeleton instead. She used a Bromley sled. Vathje was named one of the three women to represent Canada in skeleton at the 2018 Winter Olympics in Pyeongchang after finishing third in the World Cup season standings for 2017–18. She retired in 2022 after being left off the Canadian team for the 2021–22 season. Elisabeth has since transitioned in to leadership within the International sporting realm, sitting on the International Bobsleigh & Skeleton Federation (IBSF) Executive Committee. She was elected to the World Anti Doping Agency Athletes Council in early 2025 . She continues to champion good governance in the international sporting realm, educating current and future leaders through her company of the Global Association of Sports Directors (GASD)

== Notable results ==
Vathje's first international race was on the North American Cup in 2010, at Lake Placid, where she finished 8th. The following season, she finished 16th in her first Junior World Championships and continued to race on the North American circuit, taking her first international gold at Lake Placid in 2013. Vathje was promoted to the Intercontinental Cup during the 2013–14 season, and won a silver medal at her fourth Junior Worlds in Winterberg, Germany, earning her a promotion to the World Cup squad.

In the 2014–15 World Cup season, her first on the top level of international sliding, Vathje had five podium finishes including one gold medal, at Calgary, and three silvers, in Lake Placid, St. Moritz and Igls. She subsequently took home gold at races in Whistler (2016) and Winterberg (2017), as well as several additional podium finishes.

Vathje finished the 2017–18 season with 1470 points, ranking third, her best season in the overall World Cup rankings.
