= Madison Charney =

Canadian skeleton racer

Personal information
- Born: October 5, 1994 (age 31)
- Height: 1.63 m (5 ft 4 in)
- Weight: 65.0 kg (143.3 lb; 10.24 st)

Sport
- Country: Canada
- Sport: Skeleton

Madison Charney (born October 5, 1994) is a Canadian skeleton racer who has competed since 2012. In 2014–15, she finished 9th at the 2014 FIBT World Junior Championships in Winterberg, Germany. She won the 2014 Canadian senior championships and had her first World Cup top-10 finish at Calgary in December 2014.
