= Alexander Henning Hanssen =

Norwegian skeleton racer (born 1987)

Personal information
- Born: 20 February 1987 (age 38); Stavanger, Norway

Sport
- Country: Norway
- Sport: skeleton

Alexander Henning Hanssen (born 20 February 1987) is a Norwegian skeleton racer.

He competed at the IBSF World Championships 2017, where he placed 32nd in men's skeleton.

He has been selected to participate in the 2018 Winter Olympics.
