= Lanette Prediger =

Canadian skeleton racer

Personal information
- Born: August 23, 1979 (age 46) Oxbow, Saskatchewan, Canada
- Height: 1.62 m (5 ft 4 in)
- Weight: 70 kg (154 lb)

Sport
- Country: Canada
- Sport: Skeleton

Lanette Prediger (born August 23, 1979) is a Canadian skeleton racer who has competed since 2007. In 2014-15, Lanette had 4 top-10 finishes including a fourth place at St. Moritz. She competed for the top of the World Cup overall ranking.
