= Sean Greenwood =

Medal record
Skeleton
Representing Ireland

Sean Greenwood (born 30 July 1987) is a Canadian-born skeleton racer that represents Ireland. He competed for Ireland at the 2014 Winter Olympics in the Skeleton event. Previous to the 2012–13 season he represented Canada in North America Cup races.

== See also ==
- Ireland at the 2014 Winter Olympics
