= Evan Neufeldt =

Canadian skeleton racer (born 1987)

Personal information
- Born: June 16, 1987 (age 38) Saskatoon, Saskatchewan, Canada
- Height: 175 cm (5 ft 9 in)
- Weight: 78 kg (172 lb)

Sport
- Country: Canada
- Sport: Skeleton

Evan Neufeldt (born June 16, 1987) is a Canadian skeleton racer. In 2014–15, he finished 22nd in the overall ranking. He competed for the top of the World Cup overall ranking. He then finished 23rd at the 2015 FIBT World Championships.

== Career ==
Neufeldt was involved in many sports from a young age, notably in track and field, and was a pinch runner and fielder on fastball teams, a running back in high school football at Rosthern Junior College (2003, 2004), and a striker on competitive ultimate frisbee teams (Tommy Douglas Dream Machine -U of S Men's 2007-2009). While in university, he competed in track and field and pentathlon for U of S from 2008-2010 and came out with two bronze medals from Canada West Championships in Pentathlon and 4 × 200 m relay 2010. In 2009 he was sixth at Canada Summer Games in decathlon. He began skeleton in 2011 after a shoulder injury, and subsequent repair forced a break in his University education, and varsity sports career.
