= Kevin Boyer =

Canadian skeleton racer

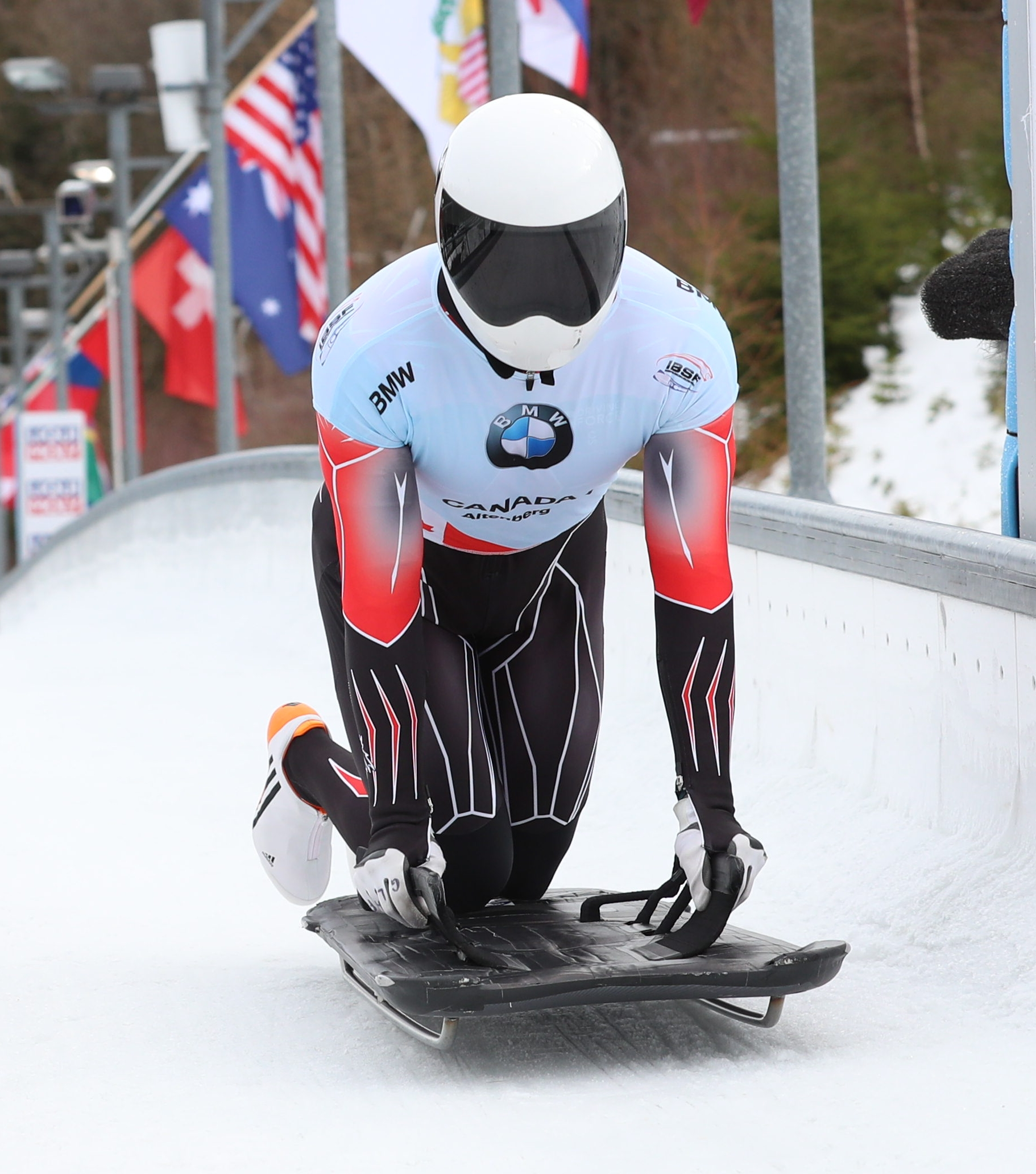
- Boyer in 2020

Personal information
- Born: 24 April 1993 (age 32) Edmonton, Alberta, Canada
- Home town: Sherwood Park, Alberta, Canada
- Height: 178 cm (5 ft 10 in)
- Weight: 84 kg (185 lb)

Sport
- Country: Canada
- Sport: Skeleton

Kevin Boyer (born 24 April 1993) is a Canadian skeleton racer. He competed in the 2018 Winter Olympics.
