= Yuki Sasahara =

Japanese skeleton racer (born 1984)

Personal information
- Full name: Yuki Sasahara
- Nationality: Japanese
- Born: 11 April 1984 (age 42) Araya, Akita, Akita
- Height: 176 cm (5 ft 9 in)
- Weight: 78 kg (172 lb)

Sport
- Country: Japan
- Sport: Skeleton

Yuki Sasahara (笹原 友希, Sasahara Yūki; born 11 April 1984) is a Japanese skeleton racer. He was a participant at the 2014 Winter Olympics in Sochi.
