= Yulia Kanakina =

Russian skeleton racer (born 1995)

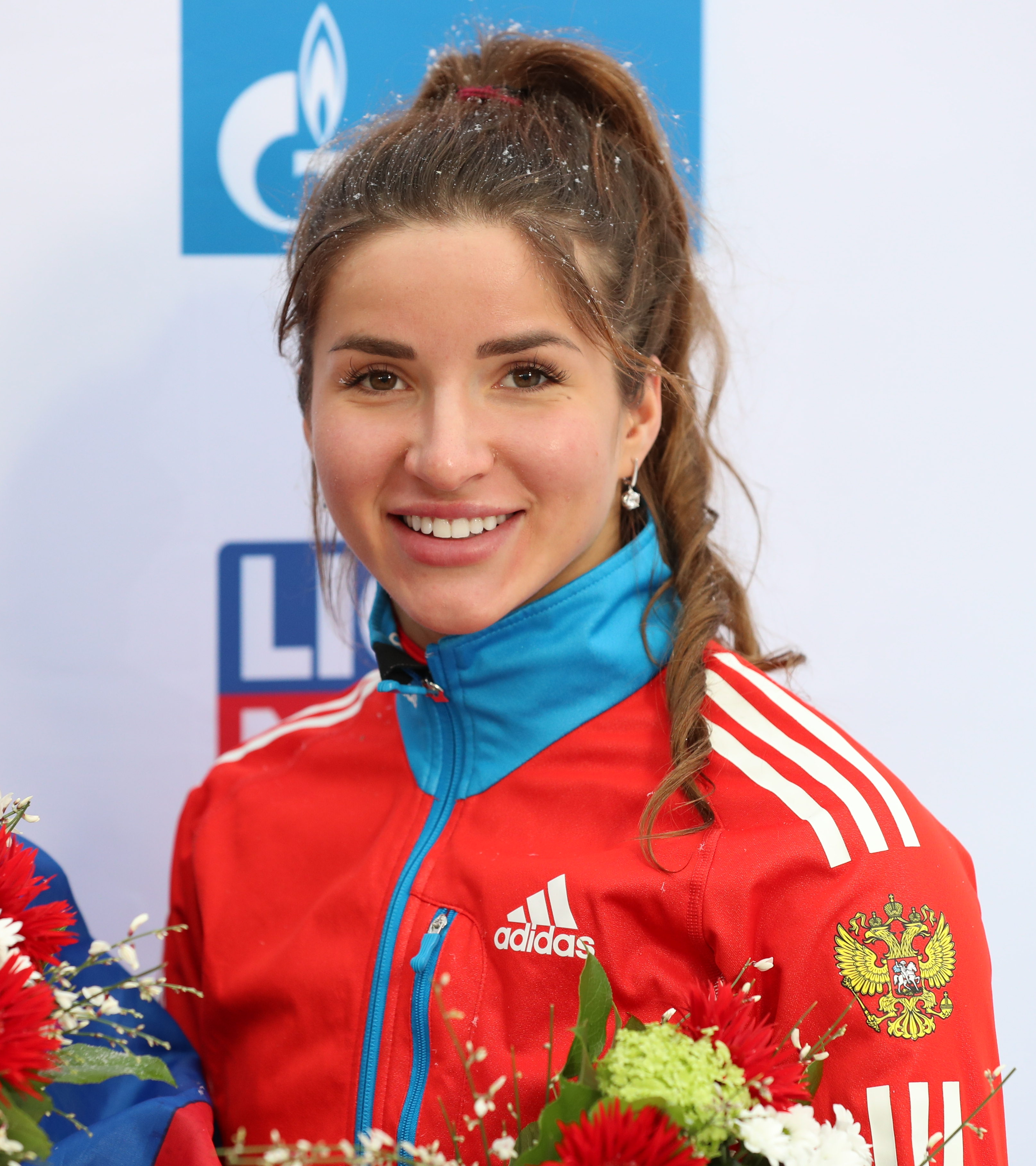
- Kanakina in 2019

Personal information
- Nationality: Russian
- Born: 11 December 1995 (age 30) Krasnoyarsk, Russia

Sport
- Country: Russia
- Sport: Skeleton
Medal record
Junior World Championships
Gold medal – first place	2017 Sigulda	women
Silver medal – second place	2018 St. Moritz	women

Yuliya Artyomovna Kanakina (Russian: Юлия Артёмовна Канакина; born 11 December 1995) is a Russian skeleton racer who competes on the Skeleton World Cup circuit. She began international competition in 2011, and was promoted to the World Cup squad in the 2014–15 season. Before starting skeleton, Kanakina was a ballet dancer. She was the IBSF Junior World Champion in women's skeleton for 2017 in Sigulda, and finished 26th in the senior IBSF World Championships later that year. In 2018, Kanakina took silver at the Junior World Championships, 0.81 seconds behind Anna Fernstädt.

== World Cup results ==
All results are sourced from the International Bobsleigh and Skeleton Federation (IBSF).

Season	1	2	3	4	5	6	7	8	9	Points	Place
2014–15	LKP; 18	CAL; 13	ALT —	KON —	STM —	IGL1 —	IGL2 —	SOC —	—N/a	200	26th
2015–16	ALT; 8	WIN; 15	KON1; 17	LKP —	PKC —	WHI —	STM; 17	KON2 —	—N/a	440	20th
2016–17	WHI; 12	LKP; 20	ALT; 7	WIN; 16	STM; 21	KON —	IGL —	PYE; 17	—N/a	610	21st
2017–18	LKP; 15	PKC; 20	WHI; 10	WIN; 12	IGL —	ALT —	STM; 18	KON; 15	—N/a	628	21st
2018–19	SIG; 7	WIN; 8	ALT; 3	KON; CNX	IGL; 7	STM —	LKP; 7	CAL1; 14	CAL2; 6	1152	7th
