= Annie O'Shea =

US skeletonist

Personal information
- Citizenship: United States
- Born: Anne O'Shea; September 5, 1987 (age 38) Rockville Centre, New York
- Education: California University of Pennsylvania
- Height: 5 ft 5 in (165 cm)
- Weight: 132 lb (60 kg)
- Website: annieoshea.wordpress.com

Sport
- Country: United States
- Sport: skeleton
- Coached by: Orvie Garrett

Anne O'Shea (born September 5, 1987) is an American skeleton racer. She got interested in skeleton after meeting the father of skeletoner John Daly at the Empire State Games in 2004, and was first selected to the national team in 2006; like many skeleton and bobsled racers, she came to the sport from track and field. O'Shea attended California University of Pennsylvania. She has won the national championship three times in her career, and was twice selected USA Bobsled-Skeleton Athlete of the Year. Away from the track, O'Shea is an MBA student at DeVry University's Keller Graduate School of Management.

== Notable results ==
O'Shea began her international competition career on the North American Cup tour in the 2006–07 season, with top-two finishes in four of her first five races. She moved up to the World Cup circuit for the 2007–08 season, finishing tenth in races at Calgary and Park City and ninth at the Junior World Championships. The following season, she dropped back to the North American and Intercontinental Cups, but recorded five NAC podiums and five top-ten results on the ICC, as well as improving her Junior World Championship ranking to eighth. O'Shea remained on the ICC for the 2009–10 season, but was promoted back to the World Cup the following year. She attended her first World Championships in 2011 at Königssee, where she finished 23rd.

O'Shea recorded her first World Cup podium with a silver at La Plagne in 2011, but spent the following two seasons on the lower-level tours. Returning to World Cup competition in 2014–15, she had a disappointing season with her best results being two ninth-place finishes and an 18th at the World Championships. In the 2015–16 season, however, she earned her first gold medal, at her home track in Lake Placid, along with a silver at Whistler and a fifth-place performance in the 2016 World Championships at Igls — finishing the season's overall World Cup rankings in fourth place, her best ever. She did not return to the same form for the 2016–17 season, however, with two sixth-place finishes as her best results and a 19th-place finish at the World Championships.

O'Shea began the Olympic 2017–18 season with a poor performance at the national team trials, which demoted her to the Intercontinental Cup to start the year, but in January, 2018, she took Katie Uhlaender's place on the World Cup squad for the race at Altenberg while Uhlaender raced the ICC event at St. Moritz. O'Shea was the only one of the three US women to make the cut, and finished in 18th place. Both women returned to their regular circuits for the following race.

O'Shea won the US national championship in 2011, 2013, and 2017.
