= Alexandros Kefalas =

Greek skeleton racer

Alexandros Kefalas (born 21 December 1984) is a Greek skeleton racer. He is a participant at the 2014 Winter Olympics in Sochi. He carried Greece's flag at the closing ceremony.
