= Nikita Tregubov =

Russian skeleton racer (born 1995)

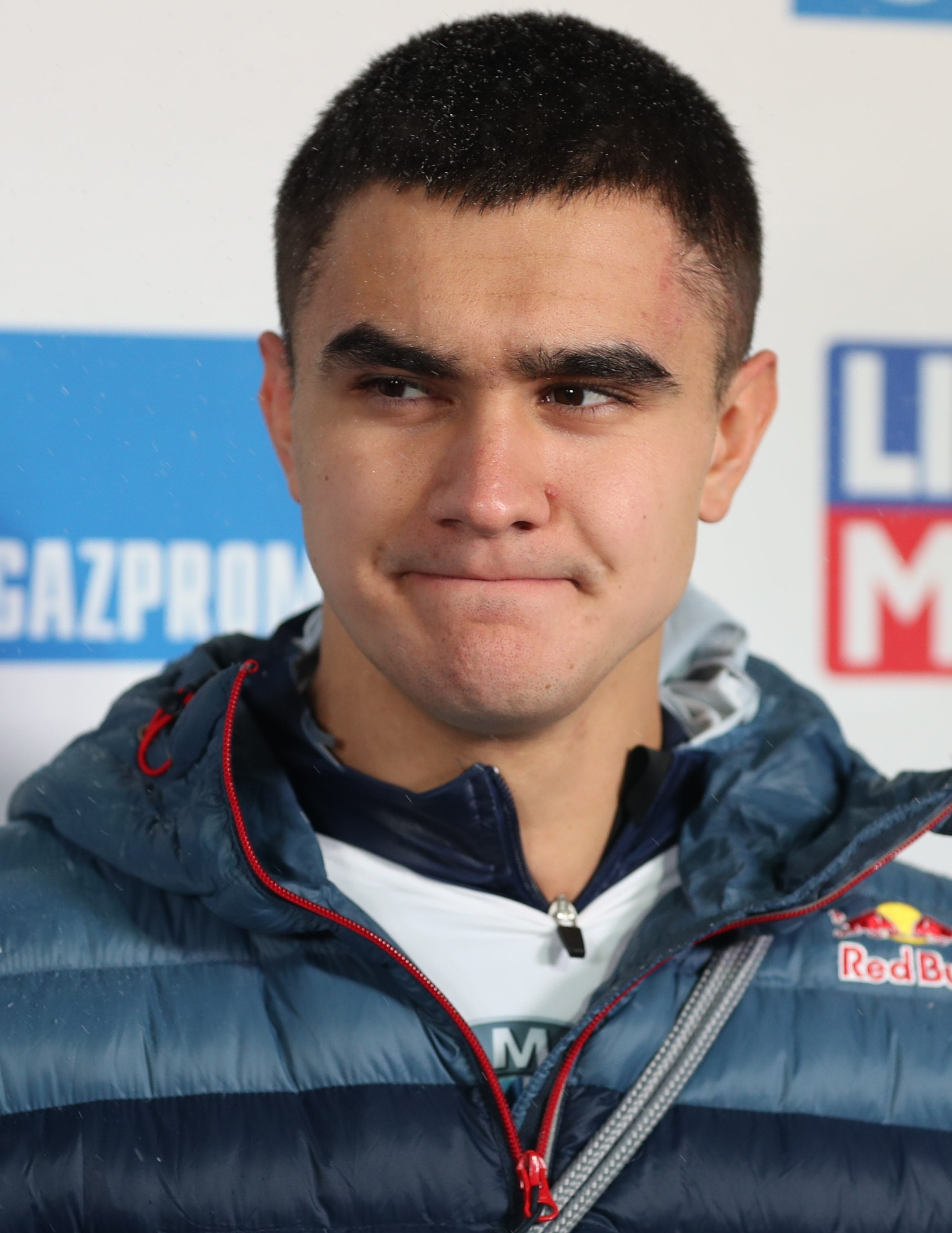
- Nikita Tregubov in 2019

Personal information
- Full name: Nikita Mikhailovich Tregubov
- Nationality: Russian
- Born: 14 February 1995 (age 31) Krasnoyarsk, Russia
- Height: 1.87 m (6 ft 2 in)
- Weight: 89 kg (196 lb)

Sport
- Country: Russia
- Sport: Skeleton
Medal record
Men's skeleton
Representing Olympic Athletes from Russia
Olympic Games
Silver medal – second place	2018 Pyeongchang	Men
Representing Russia
World Championships
Silver medal – second place	2019 Whistler	Men
Bronze medal – third place	2017 Königssee	Men
European Championships
Silver medal – second place	2018 Igls	Men
Bronze medal – third place	2016 St. Moritz	Men

Nikita Mikhailovich Tregubov (Russian: Никита Михайлович Трегубов; born 14 February 1995) is a Russian skeleton racer.

== Career ==
He competed at the 2014 Winter Olympics in his native Russia, and then improved to a silver medal in skeleton at the 2018 Winter Olympics in Korea. During the Games, Tregubov remarked that US and British athletes are "set against us politically."

Tregubov qualified for the 2022 Winter Olympics in Beijing, but was withdrawn after a positive COVID-19 test.

== World Cup results ==
All results are sourced from the International Bobsleigh and Skeleton Federation (IBSF).

Season	1	2	3	4	5	6	7	8	9	Points	Place
2014–15	LKP —	CAL —	ALT; 5	KON; 5	STM; 3	LAP; 5	IGL; 3	SOC —	—N/a	952	12th
2015–16	ALT; 3	WIN; 10	KON1; 7	LKP —	PKC —	WHI —	STM; 4	KON2 —	—N/a	704	14th
2016–17	WHI; 5	LKP; 8	ALT; 6	WIN; 6	STM; 3	KON —	IGL; 6	PYE; 5	—N/a	1256	8th
2017–18	LKP; 5	PKC; 8	WHI; 2	WIN; 14	IGL; 3	ALT; 4	STM; 6	KON; 4	—N/a	1426	5th
2018–19	SIG; 1	WIN; 4	ALT; 3	KON; CNX	IGL; 3	STM; 5	LKP; 5	CAL1; 7	CAL2; 7	1505	4th
2019–20	LKP1; 8	LKP2; 7	WIN; 19	LPL; 11	IGL; 13	KON; 9	STM; 12	SIG; 7	—N/a	1106	10th
2020–21	SIG 1; 7	SIG 2; 4	IGL 1; 3	IGL 2 —	WIN; 9	STM —	KON; 7	IGL 3; 6	—N/a	1056	7th
2021–22	IGL 1; 10	IGL 2; 6	ALT 1; 5	WIN; 6	ALT 2; 6	SIG; 7	WIN 2; 7	STM; 4	—N/a	1384	4th
