= Dom Parsons =

British skeleton racer

Dominic Parsons
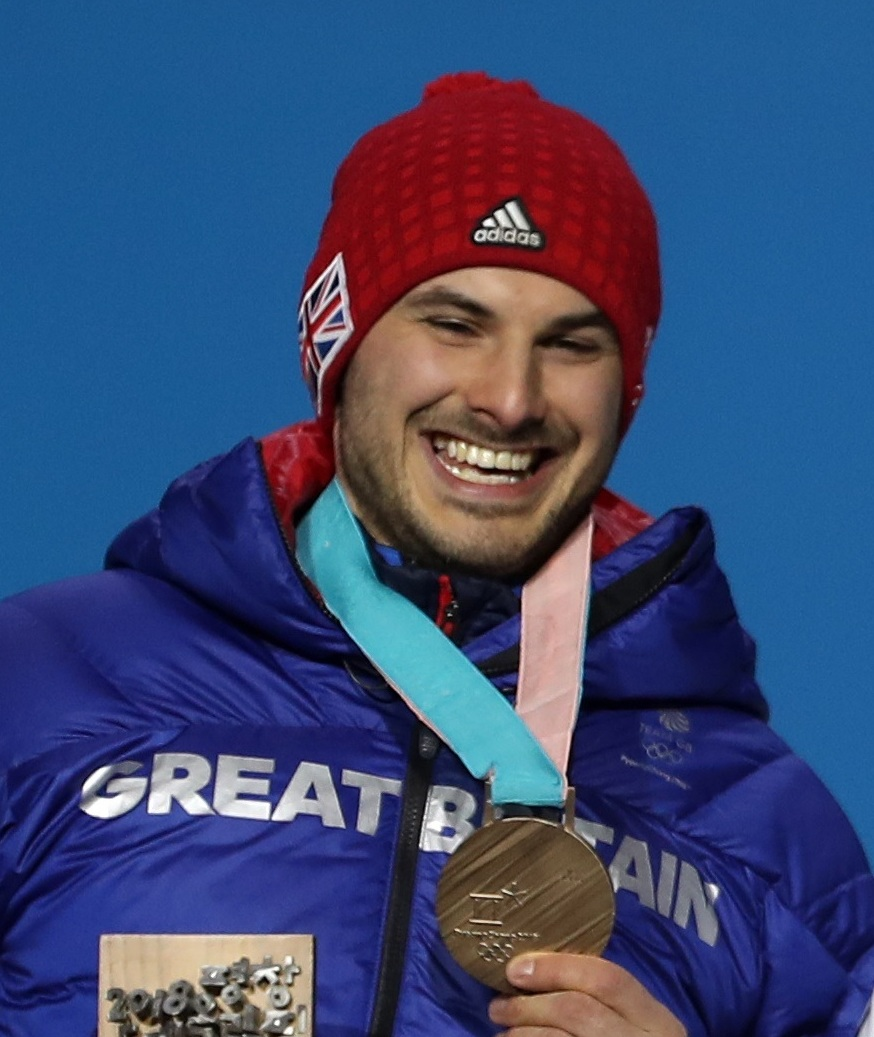
- Parsons at the 2018 Winter Olympics

Personal information
- Born: 8 September 1987 (age 39) London, England

Sport
- Country: Great Britain
- Sport: Skeleton
Medal record
Olympic Games
Bronze medal – third place	2018 Pyeongchang	Men

Dominic Edward Parsons (born 8 September 1987) is a British former skeleton racer. He won a bronze medal at the 2018 Winter Olympics in Pyeongchang, South Korea, and also competed at the 2014 Winter Olympics in Sochi, Russia. He retired from the sport at the end of 2019.

== Career ==
Parsons began as a runner for Blackheath and Bromley Harriers Athletic Club, running the 400m. He switched to skeleton in 2007 after being introduced to the sport by Adam Pengilly at the Bath bobsleigh and skeleton push-start track. He made his Europa Cup debut in 2008, and finished fourth at the 2009 and 2010 IBSF Junior Skeleton World Championships.

Parsons made his Skeleton World Cup debut in December 2012, finishing 17th in a race at La Plagne in France. In 2013, Parsons won a bronze medal at a World Cup event in Calgary, Canada. Parsons competed at the 2014 Winter Olympics in Sochi, Russia, finishing tenth. Parsons finished fifth overall in the 2014–15 and 2015–16 Skeleton World Cups, and tenth overall in the 2016–17 Skeleton World Cup. In January 2018, Parsons finished fourth at the World Cup event in St. Moritz, Switzerland. He achieved three consecutive top ten finishes in the World Championships between the 2014 and 2018 Olympics, finishing seventh in 2015, tenth in 2016 and eighth in 2017.

At the 2018 Winter Olympics in Pyeongchang, South Korea, Parsons came first in the second practice run. His sled was specifically designed for the Pyeongchang track. He later won a bronze medal in the men's skeleton event. His medal was Great Britain's first at the Games, and the first for a British male in skeleton since John Crammond at the 1948 Winter Olympics. Parsons' starting speed has been hampered by an ankle injury on the way to a dentist's appointment, which required ligament reconstruction surgery.

On 28 December 2019, the British Bobsleigh & Skeleton Association announced that Parsons was retiring from competition, after starting the season's first two races in Lake Placid, and that teammate Jerry Rice will take his place on the World Cup roster.

== Personal life ==
As of 2018, Parson was studying for a PhD at the University of Bath, researching combustion in turbo-diesel engines. Parsons and Kristan Bromley own a company which produces sleds. Parsons is in a relationship with Australian skeleton racer Jaclyn Narracott.
