= Tomass Dukurs =

Latvian skeleton racer (born 1981)

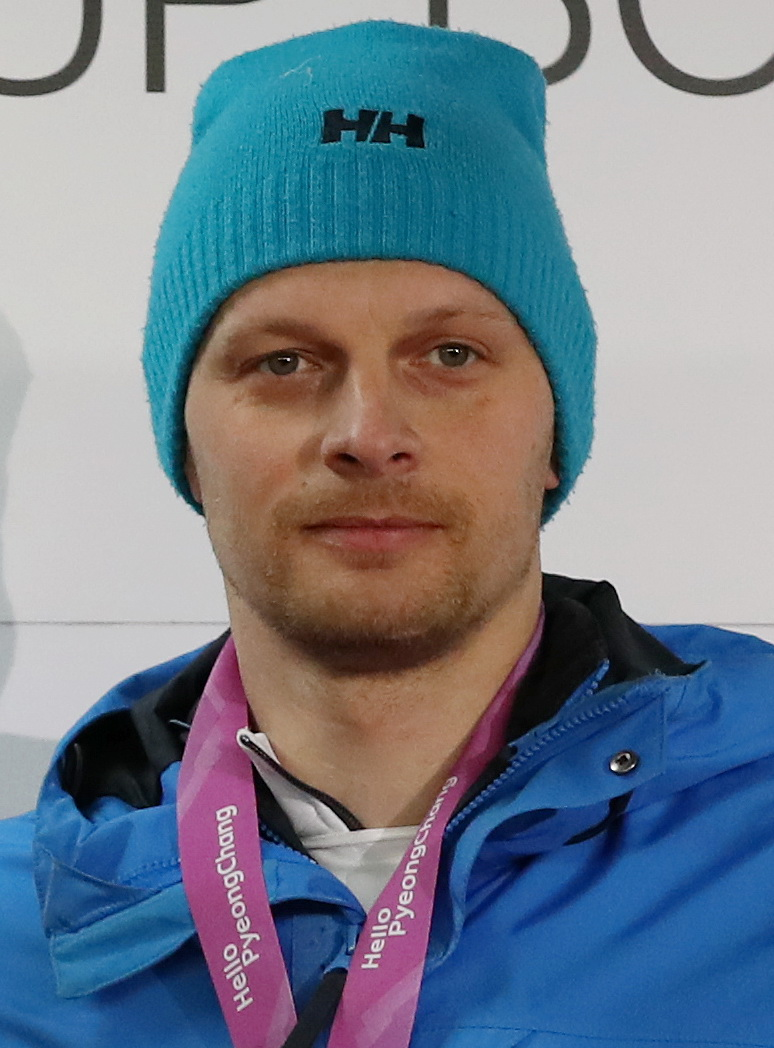
- Dukurs in 2017

Medal record

Skeleton

World Championships
| Bronze medal – third place | 2015 Winterberg | Men |

European Championships
| Gold medal – first place | 2016 St. Moritz | Men |
| Silver medal – second place | 2012 Altenberg | Men |
| Silver medal – second place | 2014 Königssee | Men |
| Silver medal – second place | 2017 Winterberg | Men |
| Silver medal – second place | 2020 Sigulda | Men |
| Bronze medal – third place | 2007 Königssee | Men |
| Bronze medal – third place | 2013 Igls | Men |
| Bronze medal – third place | 2015 La Plagne | Men |

Tomass Dukurs (born 2 July 1981 in Riga) is a Latvian skeleton racer who has competed from 1998 till 2022. Competing in three Winter Olympics, he finished fourth in the men's skeleton event at Vancouver in 2010 and Sochi in 2014.

== Career ==
Dukurs' best finish at the FIBT World Championships was 3rd in the men's skeleton event at Winterberg in 2015.

His younger brother Martins is also a skeleton racer. Both he and his brother made the 2010 Winter Olympics and the 2014 Winter Olympics.

In November 2017 Sochi gold medalist Alexander Tretiakov was disqualified by the IOC and his medal stripped from him, however, a decision on, whether Tomass Dukurs is granted a bronze medal, has not been made by the IBSF. Eventually, IBSF restored the gold medal for Tretiakov.

Tomass and Martins are coached by their father, Dainis Dukurs, a former bobsleigh brakeman, manager of the Sigulda sledding track and sled designer.

== Career results ==
=== Skeleton World Cup ===
| Season | Place | Points | 1 | 2 | 3 | 4 | 5 | 6 | 7 | 8 | 9 |
|---|---|---|---|---|---|---|---|---|---|---|---|
| 2003–04 | 19th | 69 | CAL — | LKP — | LIL; 13 | SIG; 1 | ALT — | | | | |
| 2004–05 | 17th | 154 | WIN; 31 | ALT; 15 | IGL; 23 | SIG; 9 | CES; 33 | STM; 17 | LPL; 8 | | |
| 2005–06 | 23rd | 100 | CAL; 29 | LPL; 33 | IGL; 29 | SIG; 12 | KON; 14 | STM; 23 | ALT; 18 | | |
| 2006–07 | 9th | 278 | CAL; 17 | PKC; 25 | LPL; 12 | NAG; 7 | IGL; 17 | CES; 17 | WIN; 9 | KON; 4 | |
| 2007–08 | 11th | 916 | CAL; 18 | PKC; 15 | LPL; 20 | CES1; 12 | CES2; 17 | STM; 12 | KON; 3 | WIN; 13 | |
| 2008–09 | 16th | 761 | WIN; 14 | ALT; 7 | IGL; 16 | KON; 16 | STM; 24 | WIN; 16 | PKC; 20 | LKP; 18 | |
| 2009–10 | 4th | 1352 | PKC; 12 | LKP; 4 | CES; 7 | WIN; 4 | ALT; 6 | KON; 7 | STM; 11 | IGL; 4 | |
| 2010–11 | 8th | 1242 | WHI; 10 | CAL; 25 | PKC; 7 | LKP; 8 | IGL; 8 | WIN; 4 | STM; 7 | CES; 2 | |
| 2011–12 | 3rd | 1524 | IGL; 3 | LPL; 2 | WIN; 7 | ALT; 2 | KON; 7 | STM; 4 | WHI; 5 | CAL; 4 | |
| 2012–13 | 2nd | 1746 | LKP; 2 | PKC; 4 | WHI; 3 | WIN; 5 | LPL; 3 | ALT; 4 | KON; 5 | IGL; 3 | SOC; 5 |
| 2013–14 | 2nd | 1608 | CAL; 4 | PKC; 6 | LKP; 3 | WIN; 2 | STM1; 2 | STM2; 2 | IGL; 3 | KON; 2 | |
| 2014–15 | 2nd | 1526 | LKP; 2 | CAL; 2 | ALT; 2 | KON; 8 | STM; 5 | LPL; 3 | IGL; 8 | SOC; 4 | |
| 2015–16 | 3rd | 1548 | ALT; 5 | WIN; 6 | KON1; 4 | LPL; 3 | PAC; 6 | WHI; 2 | STM; 2 | KON2; 3 | |
| 2016–17 | 9th | 1218 | WHI; 13 | LPL; 4 | ALT; 7 | WIN; 2 | STM; 6 | KON; 9 | IGL; DSQ | PYE; 3 | |
| 2017–18 | 3rd | 1464 | LPL; 6 | PAC; 4 | WHI; 3 | WIN; 5 | IGL; 6 | ALT; 6 | STM; 8 | KON; 3 | |
| 2018–19 | 7th | 1272 | SIG; 6 | WIN; 5 | ALT; 10 | IGL; 5 | STM; 4 | LPL – | CAL; 4 | WHI; 3 | |
| 2019–20 | 6th | 1314 | LPL1; 6 | LPL2; 5 | WIN; 10 | LPG; 10 | IGL; 12 | KON; 6 | STM; 9 | SIG; 2 | |
| 2020–21 | 3rd | 1226 | SIG1; 4 | SIG2; 2 | IGL1; 10 | IGL2; 8 | WIN; 6 | STM; 5 | KON; 8 | IGL3 – | |
| 2021–22 | 8th | 1249 | IGL1; 16 | IGL2; 18 | ALT1; 7 | WIN1; 7 | ALT2; 8 | SIG; 1 | WIN2; 5 | STM; 7 | |
