= Joseph Luke Cecchini =

Italian skeleton racer (born 1982)

Personal information
- Full name: Joseph Luke Cecchini
- Nationality: Italian
- Born: 25 May 1982 (age 44) Trail, British Columbia, Canada
- Height: 1.81 m (5 ft 11 in)

Sport
- Sport: Skeleton
- College team: University College of the Cariboo Sundeamons

Joseph Luke Cecchini (born 25 May 1982) is an Italian skeleton racer. He competed in the sport skeleton in the 2018 Winter Olympics.

Cecchini was originally a member of the Canadian skeleton team, but was unlikely to make an Olympic team and so switched to Italy, of which he was eligible for citizenship, as his mother is Italian. Although considered an outside contender initially, an injury to Cecchini's national team teammate prior to the Olympic season paved the way for Cecchini's selection to the Olympic team.

== Allegation of police misconduct ==
Cecchini works as a police officer in Calgary. A $150,000 lawsuit was filed against him by a limo driver and son who claimed that they were assaulted and arrested unlawfully by Cecchini and his colleagues on March 13, 2014.
