= Jaclyn Narracott =

Australian skeleton racer (born 1990)

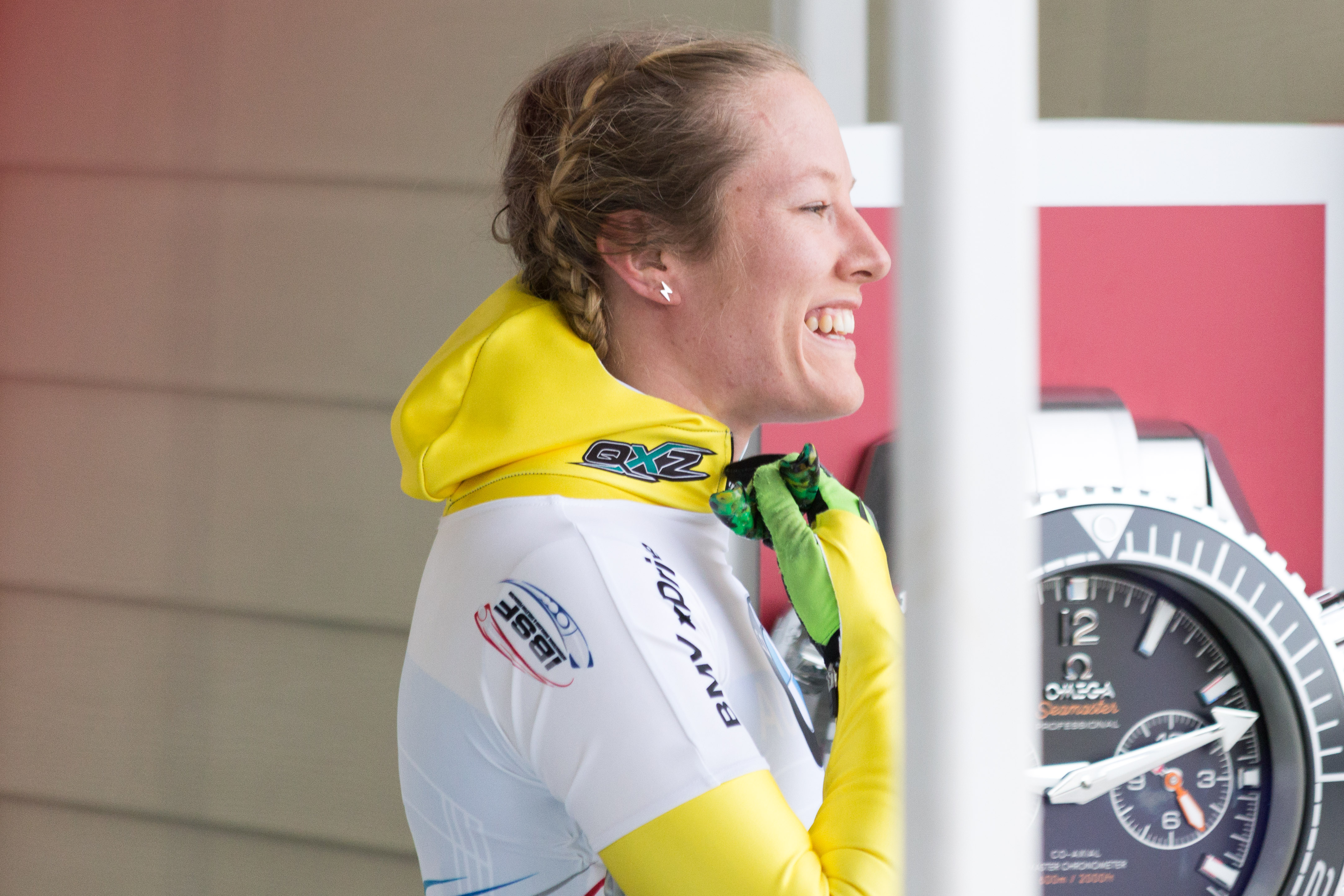
- Narracott at the 2017 World Cup race in Lake Placid

Personal information
- Nationality: Australian
- Born: 5 November 1990 (age 35) Brisbane, Queensland, Australia
- Height: 167 cm (5 ft 6 in)
- Weight: 62 kg (137 lb)

Sport
- Country: Australia
- Sport: Skeleton
- Coached by: Chris Gaviglio, Rob Ellchuk

Achievements and titles
- Olympic finals: 2nd (2022 Beijing)
Medal record
Women's skeleton
Representing Australia
Olympic Games
Silver medal – second place	2022 Beijing	Women

Jaclyn Narracott (born 5 November 1990) is an Australian former skeleton racer who competed on the Skeleton World Cup circuit. She began international skeleton competition in 2012 when she joined the Australian national team; in 2011 she competed in bobsleigh for two European Cup races. Narracott has competed on the World Cup, the top level of international skeleton, since 2014; prior to that she competed on the European and North American Cups. She slides on a Bromley sled, and lives and trains in Bath, England, with the British bobsleigh and skeleton athletes. Australian Olympic track and bobsleigh athlete Paul Narracott is her uncle. She is in a relationship with British skeleton slider Dom Parsons.

Narracott is the first Australian athlete to earn an Olympic medal in skeleton, after winning the silver medal at the 2022 Winter Olympics in Beijing. This also marked Australia's first medal in any sliding sport at the Winter Olympics. Additionally, Narracott's result lifted Australia's medal tally at Beijing to 4, the highest medal tally Australia has ever achieved at a Winter Olympics.

== Notable results ==
At the IBSF World Championships 2017 in Königssee, Narracott finished 17th, matching her ranking from 2016. Her best World Championship result was 16th, in 2015. Her best World Cup result was a first place in 2022. In 2017–18, she finished 18th in World Cup points and 21st in overall ranking, which earned Australia the continental quota spot for Oceania, and Narracott was subsequently selected to the Australian Olympic Team for the 2018 Winter Olympics in Pyeongchang.

Narracott was selected again for 2022 Winter Olympics in Beijing, where she went on to win the silver medal.

In October 2024, Narracott retired from competitions.
