= Maria Orlova =

Russian skeleton racer

Personal information
- Nationality: Russian
- Born: 14 April 1988 (age 38) Leningrad, Soviet Union
- Height: 1.65 m (5 ft 5 in)
- Weight: 67 kg (148 lb)

Sport
- Country: Russia
- Sport: Skeleton
Medal record
Women's skeleton
Representing Russia
World Championships
Disqualified	2015 Winterberg	Mixed team
European Championships
Silver medal – second place	2013 Igls	Women

Maria Sergeyevna Orlova (Russian: Мария Сергеевна Орлова; born 14 April 1988) is a Russian skeleton racer who joined the national squad in 2008. Orlova's best Skeleton World Cup finish was 3rd place in one of the 2012–13 season's stages. She won the silver medal at the European Championships 2013. She competed at the 2014 Winter Olympics in Sochi but was disqualified on 22 November 2017.
