= Ander Mirambell =

Spanish skeleton racer

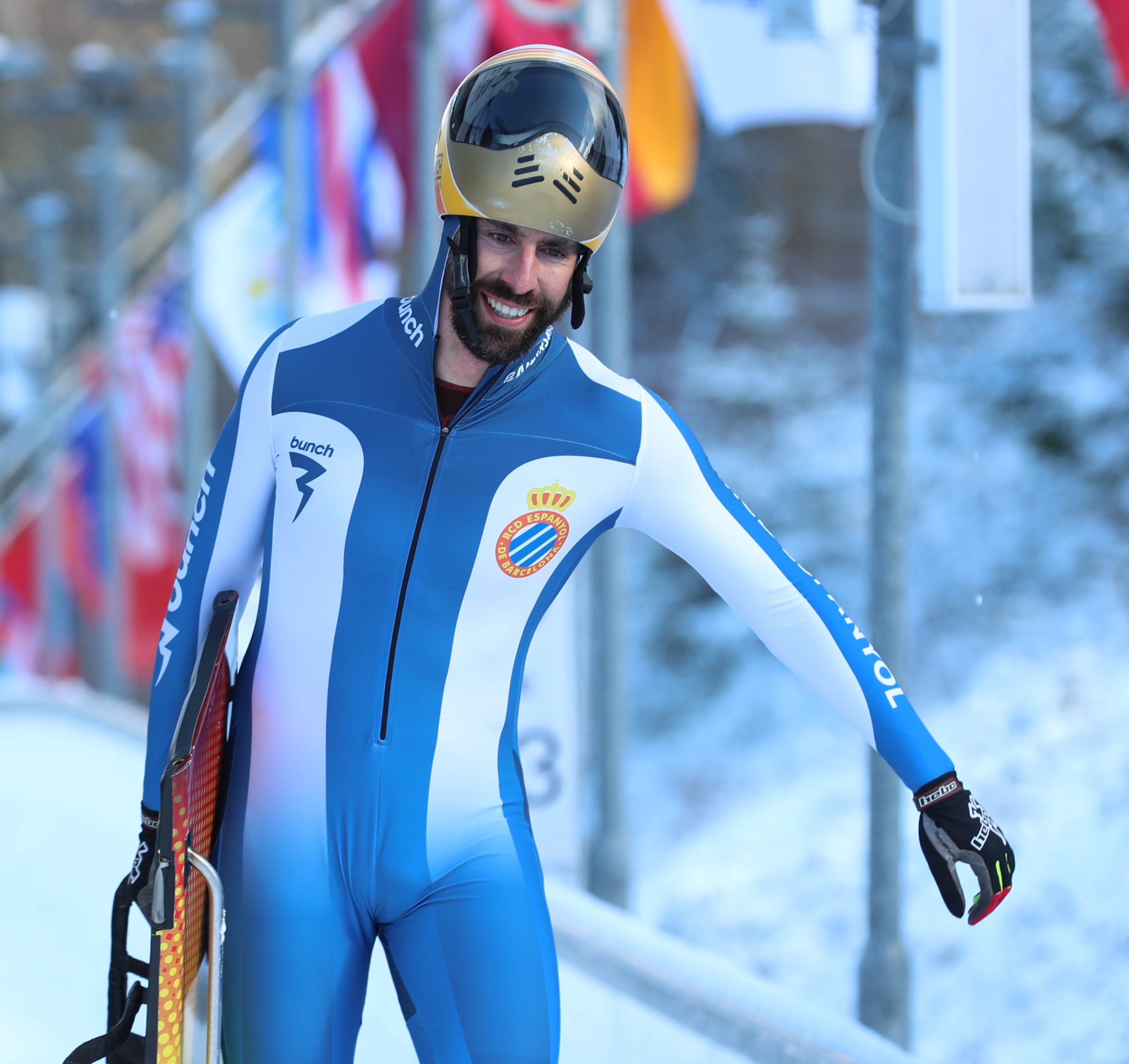
- Ander Mirambell (2020)

Personal information
- Full name: Ander Mirambell Viña
- Born: 17 February 1983 (age 43) Calella, Barcelona, Spain

Sport
- Country: Spain
- Sport: Skeleton

Ander Mirambell Viñas (born 17 February 1983) is a Spanish skeleton racer who has competed since 2005. He is Spain's first skeleton athlete. His best World Cup finish was 14th in the men's event at Whistler in November 2010.

Mirambell's best finish at the FIBT World Championships was 22nd in the men's event in 2013.

He participated in the 2010 Winter Olympics, where he finished in 24th place.

In 2014 he published a book, Rompiendo el hielo (English: Breaking the Ice).

== Olympic results ==
Season	Date	Location	Discipline	Place
2010	19 Feb 2010	Vancouver, Canada	Men's skeleton	24th
2014	15 Feb 2014	(Russia) Sochi, Rusia	Men's skeleton	26th
2018	16 Feb 2018	Pyeongchang, South Korea	Men's skeleton	23rd
2022	11 Feb 2022	Beijing, China	Men's skeleton	24th

== World Championships results ==
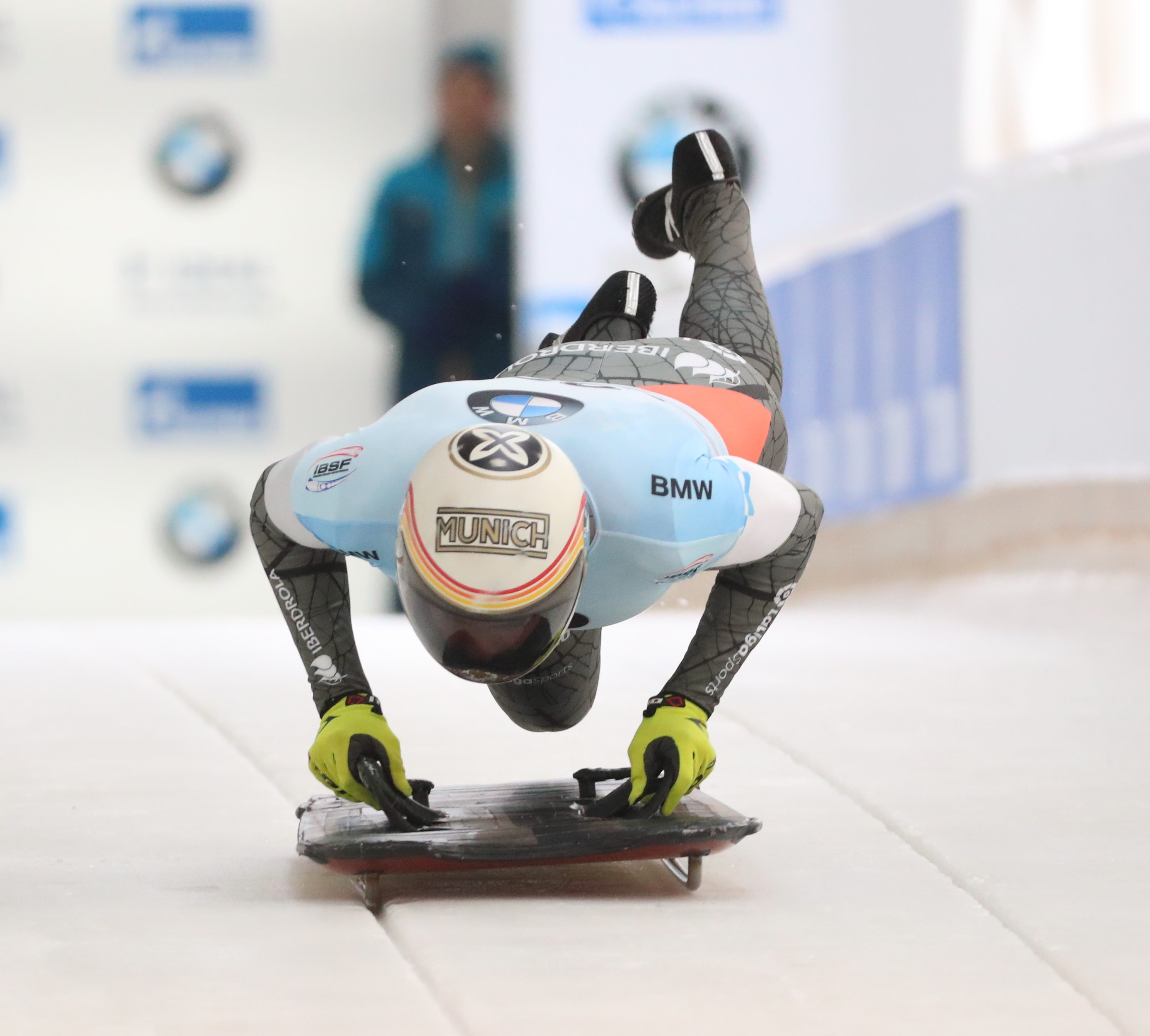
Ander Mirambell at the 2020 Skeleton World Championships in Altenberg

Season	Location	Place
2008	(Germany) Altenberg	27th
2009	(United States) Lake Placid	27th
2011	(Germany) Königssee	26th
2012	(United States) Lake Placid	25th
2013	(Switzerland) St. Moritz	22nd
2015	(Germany) Winterberg	30th
2016	(Austria) Igls	27th
2017	(Germany) Königssee	20th
2019	(Canada) Whistler	DNS
2020	(Germany) Altenberg	DNF
