= Raphael Maier =

Austrian skeleton racer (born 1992)

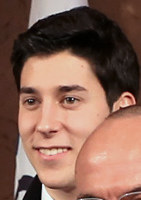

Raphael Maier (born 9 August 1992) is an Austrian skeleton racer. He is a participant at the 2014 Winter Olympics in Sochi.
