= Laura Deas =

British sports woman

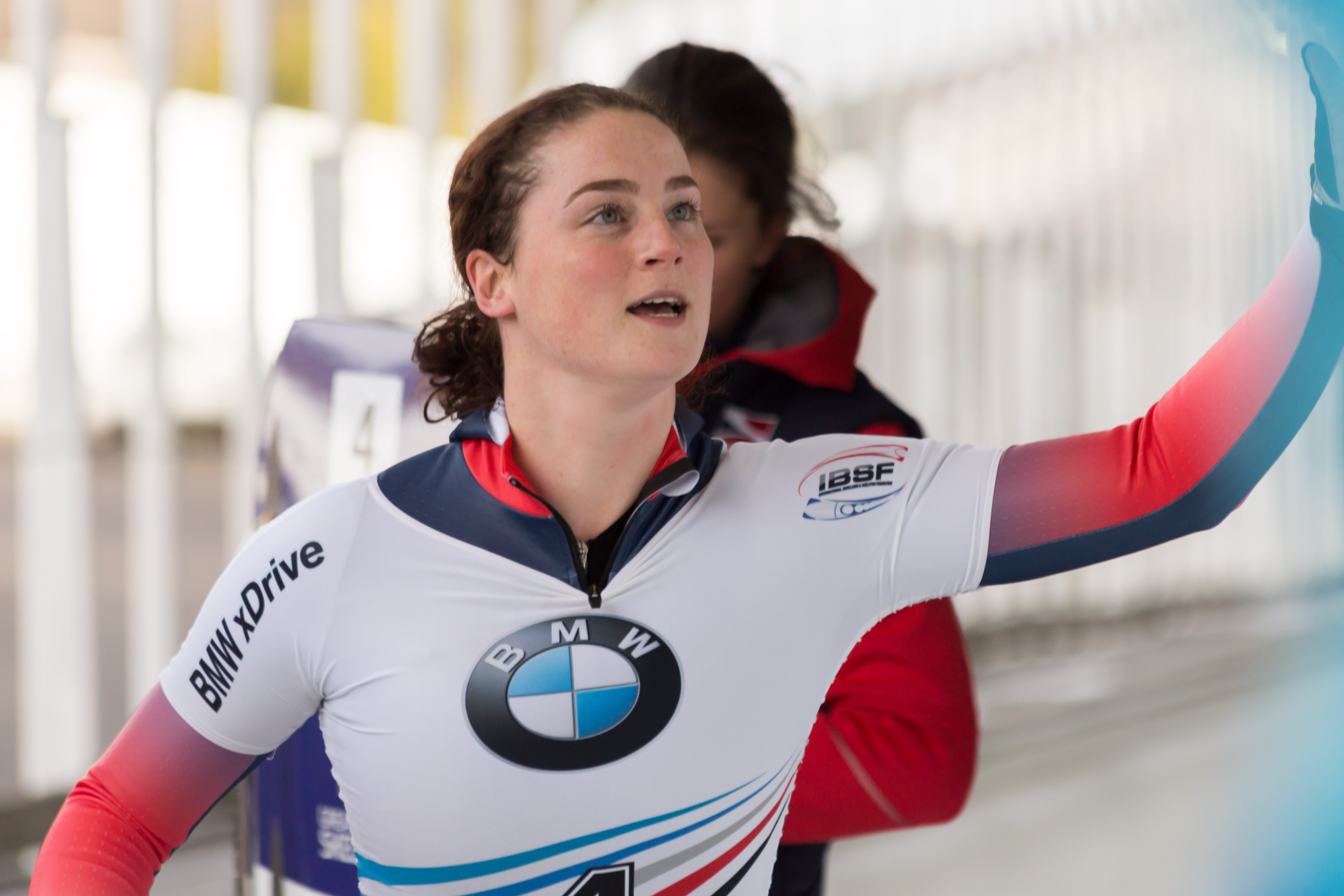
- Deas in 2017 in Lake Placid

Personal information
- Born: 19 August 1988 (age 38) Wrexham, Wales
- Height: 5 ft 6 in (1.68 m)
- Weight: 10 st 3 lb (65 kg)
- Website: LauraDeas.co.uk

Sport
- Country: Great Britain
- Sport: Skeleton
Medal record
Women's skeleton
Representing Great Britain
Olympic Games
Bronze medal – third place	2018 Pyeongchang	Women
World Championships
Silver medal – second place	2023 St. Moritz	Mixed team

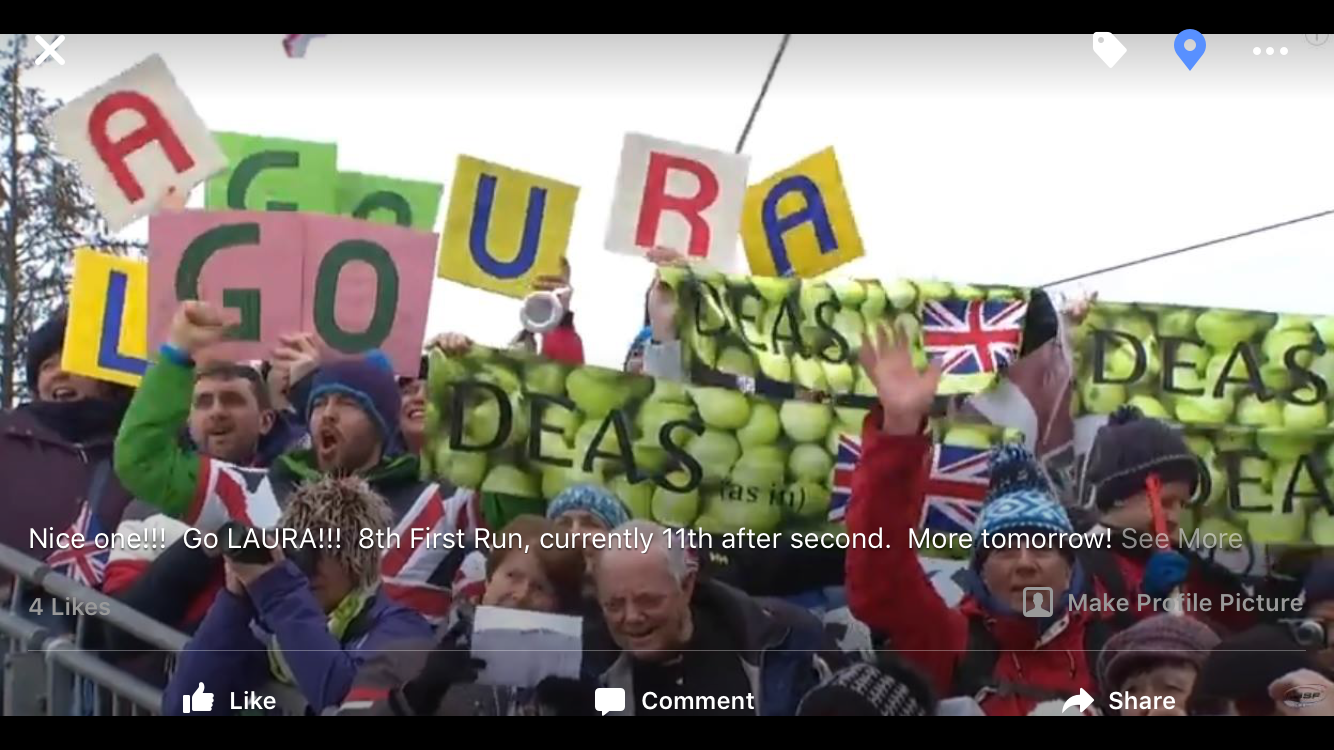
Fans in Igls – February 2016

Laura Isabelle Deas (/diːz/ DEEZ; born 19 August 1988) is a British sportswoman, best known as a skeleton racer on the World Cup circuit, representing the British Bobsleigh and Skeleton Association. She won bronze at the 2018 Winter Olympics in Pyeongchang, South Korea.

== Early life ==
Born in Wrexham, Wales, Deas attended Howell's School, Denbigh. She played hockey, representing North Wales in competition, and participated in equestrian sports, from Pony Club tetrathlon in which she became team captain and latterly eventing (taking it up professionally from 2006 to 2008),

== Skeleton ==
Deas was brought into skeleton in 2009 through UK Sport's "Girls4Gold" talent identification programme and was selected to UK national team the following year. She rides a Blackroc sled.

Deas won her first Europe Cup race in Winterberg in 2010, in only her fifth international race, after placing third in the two previous races. Deas finished fourth in her only Junior World Championships, in 2011 (her only year of eligibility) at Park City. In March 2012, she joined the North American Cup circuit for two races at Lake Placid, both with podium finishes. For the next two seasons, Deas competed in the Intercontinental Cup, where she had one third-place finish and two second-place finishes.

She made her World Cup debut in the 2014–15 season, in which she claimed two medals, took seventh place in the world championships at Winterberg, and finished fifth overall. Deas earned her first World Cup victory in the opening race of the 2015–16 season. The same season she also finished third at Lake Placid and fifth at the European Championships in St. Moritz. Her best European Championship result was fourth, in 2017 at Igls.

In the overall World Cup rankings, Deas finished her first season in fifth place, with 1314 points. The following year, despite earning more points, she dropped back to seventh place; and in 2016–17, 1240 points was good enough for sixth place.

Deas featured in the Olympic team for the first time in 2018 after finishing the World Cup season standings in seventh place, ahead of fellow Team GB skeletoner and defending Olympic champion Lizzy Yarnold. She took the bronze medal behind winner Yarnold and silver medallist Jacqueline Lölling, thus becoming the first Welsh woman to win a Winter Olympic medal. Deas competed for Great Britain again in the 2022 Winter Olympics and finished in 19th place, a result that has since been attributed to inadequate equipment.

Having not raced since February 2023, missing the 2023–24 season on maternity leave, Deas announced her retirement from skeleton racing in April 2025.
