= Lee Han-sin =

South Korean skeleton racer

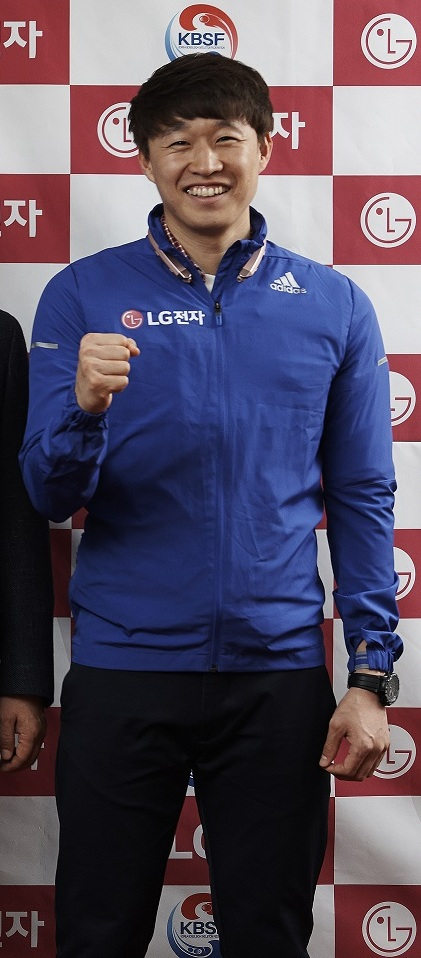

Korean name
- Hangul: 이한신
- RR: I Hansin
- MR: I Hansin

Lee Han-sin (Korean: 이한신; born February 27, 1988) is a South Korean skeleton racer. He is a participant at the 2014 Winter Olympics in Sochi. He was born in Jinan, North Jeolla Province, South Korea.
