= Barrett Martineau =

Canadian Olympic skeleton racer (born 1991)

Personal information
- Born: September 4, 1991 (age 34) Calgary, Alberta, Canada
- Height: 1.78 m (5 ft 10 in)
- Weight: 83 kg (183 lb)
- Website: BarrettMartineau.com

Sport
- Country: Canada
- Sport: Skeleton
Medal record
Men's Skeleton
Representing Canada
FIBT World Junior Championships
| Bronze medal – third place | 2013 Igls | Men's |

Barrett Martineau (born September 4, 1991) is a Canadian Olympic skeleton racer who has competed since 2010. He was the Canadian Champion in both the 2016/2017 and 2017/2018 seasons. Barrett competed for Canada at the 2018 Winter Olympic Games in PyeongChang South Korea. In 2016–17, he finished 13th in the overall ranking. He competed for the top of the World Cup overall ranking. He then finished 13th at the 2017 IBSF World Championships. He also won 7 America's Cups and 3 Canadian National Titles.
