= Rhys Thornbury =

New Zealand skeleton racer

Personal information
- Born: 15 January 1990 (age 35)
- Height: 183 cm (6 ft 0 in)
- Weight: 96 kg (212 lb; 15 st 2 lb)

Sport
- Country: New Zealand
- Sport: Skeleton

Rhys Thornbury (born 15 January 1990) is a skeleton racer from New Zealand. He competed for New Zealand at the 2018 Winter Olympics. Away from sport, he is a weapons technician for the Royal Air Force.
