= Matthew Antoine =

American skeleton racer (born 1985)

Personal information
- Born: April 2, 1985 (age 41)
- Height: 6 ft 3 in (191 cm)
- Weight: 185 lb (84 kg)

Sport
- Country: United States
- Sport: Skeleton
Medal record
Men's skeleton
Representing the United States
Olympic Games
Bronze medal – third place	2014 Sochi	Men
World Championships
Gold medal – first place	2012 Lake Placid	Mixed team

Matthew Antoine (born April 2, 1985) is an American skeleton racer who has competed since 2003.

Antoine graduated from the California University of Pennsylvania in 2009 with a degree in sports management, wellness and fitness.

Antoine won gold in the mixed team event at the FIBT World Championships 2012 in Lake Placid, New York. His best World Cup race finish was first at Lake Placid in December 2013. He ranked third overall in the 2013–14 Skeleton World Cup.

He won the bronze medal at the 2014 Winter Olympics in Sochi, the first U.S. medal in men's skeleton since Jimmy Shea won gold at the 2002 Winter Olympics.

Antoine and John Daly were named to represent the U.S. at the 2018 Winter Olympics in Pyeongchang; he finished 11th.
