= Dorin Dumitru Velicu =

Romanian skeleton racer

Personal information
- Born: 29 November 1986 (age 39) Hunedoara, Romania

Sport
- Country: Romania
- Sport: Skeleton

Dorin Dumitru Velicu (born in Hunedoara on 29 November 1986) is a skeleton racer who competed for Romania at the 2014 Winter Olympics and at the 2018 Winter Olympics.
