= Matthias Guggenberger =

Austrian skeleton racer (born 1984)

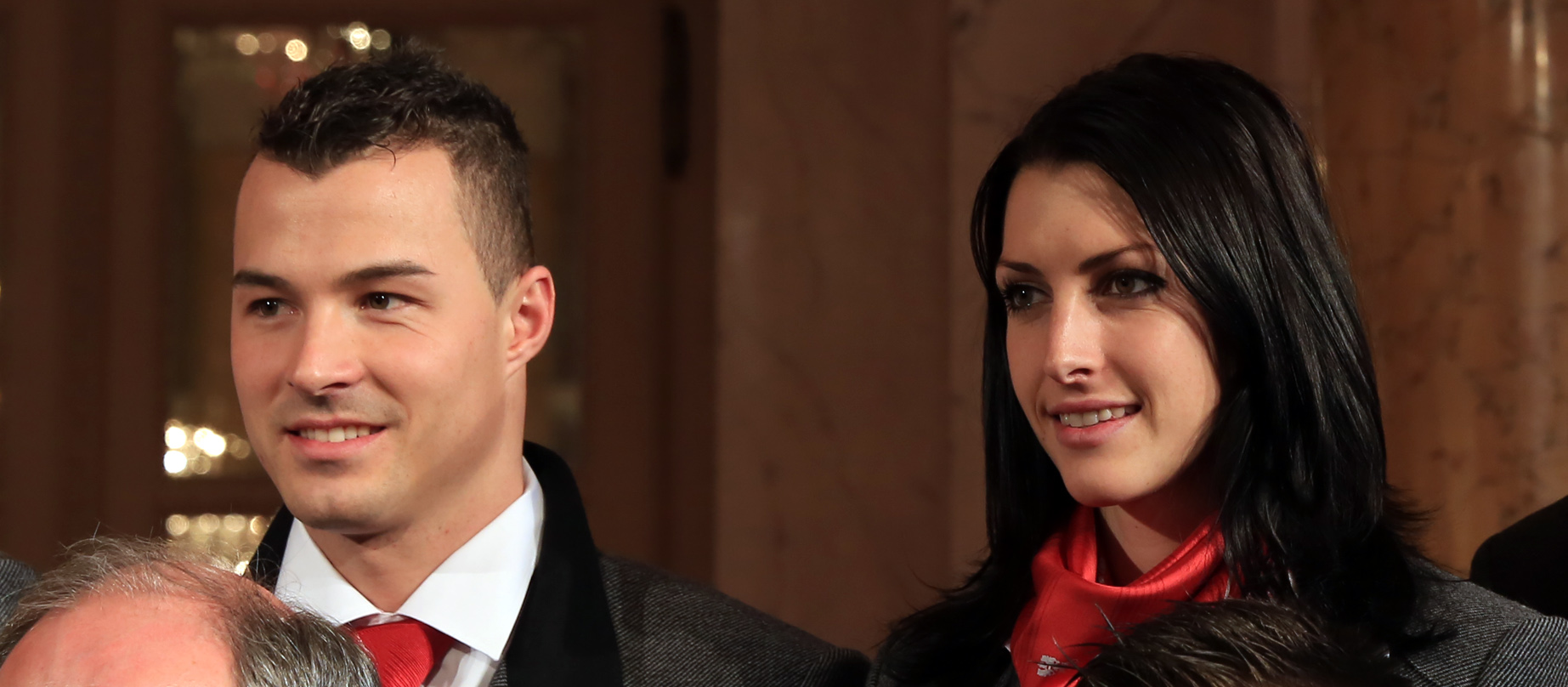
- Guggenberger (left) and Janine Flock in 2014

Medal record

Men's skeleton

Representing Austria

World Championships
Silver medal – second place	2016 Igls	Mixed team

Matthias Guggenberger (born 24 September 1984, in Innsbruck) is an Austrian skeleton racer who has competed since 2005. His best Skeleton World Cup finish was 3rd at Königssee He won silver at the world championship 2016 in Igls (Team). 2018-2022 he was coach of Martins and Tomass Dukurs and Janine Flock. The won 9 globes at the world cup, 9 medals at European championships and three world championship medals. Now he is coaching the British skeleton team.

Athletic Career

Matthias Guggenberger has been a regular member of the Austrian national team since 2006. He made his World Cup debut in Igls in January 2007, shortly after recovering from a serious illness, and immediately finished 11th. Soon afterwards, he achieved his first top-10 World Cup result with a seventh-place finish in Winterberg.

At his first European Championships, Guggenberger moved up from 17th place after the first run to finish sixth overall, setting the fastest time of the second run. At the 2007 Junior World Championships, he finished fifth. From that point onwards, Guggenberger was a consistent member of Austria’s World Cup team.

During the 2008/09 season, he recorded another single-digit result by finishing sixth in Königssee. In November 2009, he competed in a European Cup race, also in Königssee, where he celebrated his first victory in an international competition.

Following a season of consistently strong World Cup performances, including four top-10 finishes and eighth place at the European Championships, Guggenberger competed at the Olympic Winter Games. On the Whistler track, he was surprisingly in fourth place after the first two runs and eventually finished eighth overall after four runs.

In the first post-Olympic winter, Guggenberger managed only one single-digit World Cup result, achieved on his home track in Igls. Around a year later, however, he celebrated his first World Cup podium by finishing third in Königssee. He ended the season tenth in the overall World Cup standings, placing inside the overall top 10 for the first time. At the World Championships in Lake Placid, he finished 18th.

Over the following two winters, his best results were a tenth-place finish in Königssee in January 2013 and an 11th-place finish in Lake Placid in December 2013. He subsequently competed at his second Olympic Winter Games in Sochi in February 2014, where he finished 14th.

During the 2014/15 season, Guggenberger placed inside the top 10 in five of the eight World Cup races, helping him finish tenth in the overall World Cup standings for the second time in his career. At the 2015 World Championships in Winterberg, he finished 19th in the individual event and sixth in the team competition.

In 2016, Guggenberger won a bronze medal in the team event at the World Championships in Igls. He ended his active World Cup career in 2018.

Guggenberger is also a multiple Austrian national champion and Tyrolean champion.

Coaching Career

From the 2018/19 season onwards, Guggenberger coached the successful Latvian brothers Martins and Tomass Dukurs. In his very first season working with them, Martins won the World Championship title in Whistler as well as the European Championship title in Innsbruck. During the 2019/20 winter season, Martins won the overall World Cup and another European Championship title, while his brother Tomass finished as European Championship runner-up.

In both the 2020/21 and 2021/22 seasons, Martins Dukurs again won the overall World Cup title and added two further European Championship medals to his record. Alongside the Latvian athletes, Guggenberger also coached Austrian skeleton athlete Janine Flock, who won the European Championship title in 2019. During the 2019/20 season, Flock won bronze medals at both the World Championships in Altenberg and the European Championships in Sigulda. She also finished second in the overall World Cup standings. In 2020/21 and 2021/22, Flock won another European Championship medal in each season and also secured a small Crystal Globe in the World Cup.

Since 2022, Guggenberger has coached the British skeleton team, taking over the official role of national head coach in 2023. At the 2023 World Championships on the Olympia Bob Run in St. Moritz, his athlete Matt Weston became World Champion, while the mixed teams of Laura Deas / Matt Weston and Brogan Crowley / Craig Thompson won silver and bronze respectively.

The team’s run of success continued at the 2024 World Championships in Winterberg, where British athletes won further silver and bronze medals. During the 2024/25 season, the team won several medals at the World Championships, including individual gold for Matt Weston. Athletes coached by Guggenberger also secured the European Championship title and the overall World Cup title.

At the 2026 Olympic Winter Games in Milan-Cortina, Guggenberger achieved historic success as coach of the British skeleton team. Under his sporting guidance, Matt Weston of Great Britain won the gold medal in the men’s individual competition. Guggenberger was also part of the coaching team that contributed to victory in the mixed-team event featuring Weston and Marcus Wyatt.

In the women’s competition, Janine Flock of Austria won gold. Guggenberger had previously been closely connected with Flock both personally and professionally and had coached her during earlier stages of her career. As a result, Guggenberger was involved in three gold-medal performances at the same Olympic Games.

Following the 2026 Olympic Winter Games, Guggenberger was promoted from Head Coach Skeleton to Head Coach Bobsleigh and Skeleton, taking overall coaching responsibility across both disciplines within the British programme.

Over the course of his coaching career, Guggenberger has therefore been involved in winning all of the major titles in international skeleton: European Championship, World Championship, overall World Cup, and Olympic gold.

Personal Life

Matthias Guggenberger lives near Innsbruck in Tyrol, Austria. His father was also a skeleton athlete and later worked as a coach for the South Korean skeleton team. His brother was an actor. Guggenberger lives with his long-term partner, Janine Flock.

He qualified for the 2010 and 2014 and 2018 Winter Olympics, finishing 8th and 14th respectively.
