= 2013–14 Skeleton World Cup =

Winners
- Men: Martins Dukurs (LAT)
- Women: Lizzy Yarnold (GBR)

Competitions
- Venues: 7

The 2013–14 Skeleton World Cup was a multi-race tournament over a season for skeleton. The season started on 29 November 2013 in Calgary, Canada, and ended on 25 January 2014 in Königssee, Germany. The World Cup was organised by the FIBT who also run World Cups and Championships in bobsleigh.

== Calendar ==
Below is the schedule of the 2013–14 season. This edition was covering eight events on seven different tracks in five countries. The fact of having eight events in only seven tracks means that each discipline had one double race over the season.

| Venue | Date | Details |
|---|---|---|
| (Canada) Calgary | 29 November 2013 | |
| (United States) Park City | 6 December 2013 | |
| (United States) Lake Placid | 13–15 December 2013 | Double race for women; the second race was shortened to one run. |
| (Germany) Winterberg | 3–4 January 2014 | |
| (Switzerland) St. Moritz | 10–12 January 2014 | Double race for men. |
| (Austria) Igls | 17–18 January 2014 | |
| (Germany) Königssee | 24–25 January 2014 | Also served as FIBT European Championships; the women's race was shortened to one run. |

== Results ==
=== Men ===
| Event: | Gold: | Time | Silver: | Time | Bronze: | Time |
|---|---|---|---|---|---|---|
| Calgary | Martins Dukurs; Latvia | 1:51.39 (56.08 / 55.31) | Aleksandr Tretyakov; Russia | 1:52.14 (56.31 / 55.83) | Dominic Parsons; United Kingdom | 1:52.74 (56.60 / 56.14) |
| Park City | Aleksandr Tretyakov; Russia | 1:37.59 (48.78 / 48.81) | Martins Dukurs; Latvia | 1:37.71 (48.58 / 49.13) | Matthew Antoine; United States | 1:37.73 (48.95 / 48.78) |
| Lake Placid | Matthew Antoine; United States | 1:47.58 (53.89 / 53.69) | Aleksandr Tretyakov; Russia | 1:48.21 (54.15 / 54.06) | Tomass Dukurs; Latvia | 1:48.34 (54.18 / 54.16) |
| Winterberg | Martins Dukurs; Latvia | 1:54.93 (57.26 / 57.67) | Tomass Dukurs; Latvia | 1:56.12 (58.03 / 58.09) | Aleksandr Tretyakov; Russia | 1:56.46 (58.11 / 58.35) |
| St. Moritz (Race 1) | Martins Dukurs; Latvia | 2:19.18 (1:09.88 / 1:09.30) | Tomass Dukurs; Latvia | 2:19.44 (1:09.74 / 1:09.70) | Matthew Antoine; United States | 2:19.87 (1:09.90 / 1:09.97) |
| St. Moritz (Race 2) | Martins Dukurs; Latvia | 2:15.54 (1:08.14 / 1:07.40) | Tomass Dukurs; Latvia | 2:16.63 (1:08.71 / 1:07.92) | John Fairbairn; Canada | 2:17.32 (1:08.99 / 1:08.33) |
| Igls | Martins Dukurs; Latvia | 1:45.76 (53.00 / 52.76) | Aleksandr Tretyakov; Russia | 1:46.01 (53.04 / 52.97) | Tomass Dukurs; Latvia | 1:47.17 (53.71 / 53.46) |
| Königssee | Martins Dukurs; Latvia | 1:40.83 (50.66 / 50.17) | Tomass Dukurs; Latvia | 1:41.65 (51.12 / 50.53) | Frank Rommel; Germany | 1:41.73 (51.15 / 50.58) |

=== Women ===
| Event: | Gold: | Time | Silver: | Time | Bronze: | Time |
|---|---|---|---|---|---|---|
| Calgary | Lizzy Yarnold; United Kingdom | 1:55.04 (57.59 / 57.45) | Elena Nikitina; Russia | 1:55.28 (57.80 / 57.48) | Michelle Steele; Australia | 1:55.30 (57.82 / 57.48) |
| Park City | Noelle Pikus-Pace; United States | 1:39.54 (49.80 / 49.74) | Lizzy Yarnold; United Kingdom | 1:40.22 (50.08 / 50.14) | Sarah Reid; Canada | 1:40.60 (50.19 / 50.41) |
| Lake Placid (Race 1) | Noelle Pikus-Pace; United States | 1:51.37 (55.70 / 55.67) | Anja Huber; Germany | 1:51.83 (56.02 / 55.81) | Lizzy Yarnold; United Kingdom | 1:51.88 (56.20 / 55.68) |
| Lake Placid (Race 2) | Lizzy Yarnold; United Kingdom | 56.27 | Janine Flock; Austria | 56.61 | Noelle Pikus-Pace; United States | 56.72 |
| Winterberg | Lizzy Yarnold; United Kingdom | 1:57.53 (58.94 / 58.59) | Noelle Pikus-Pace; United States | 1:58.10 (58.94 / 59.16) | Sarah Reid; Canada | 1:58.49 (59.27 / 59.22) |
| St. Moritz | Noelle Pikus-Pace; United States | 2:19.88 (1:09.97 / 1:09.91) | Lizzy Yarnold; United Kingdom | 2:20.28 (1:10.32 / 1:09.96) | Shelley Rudman; United Kingdom | 2:20.32 (1:10.37 / 1:09.95) |
| Igls | Lizzy Yarnold; United Kingdom | 1:49.04 (54.63 / 54.41) | Noelle Pikus-Pace; United States | 1:49.36 (54.72 / 54.64) | Janine Flock; Austria; Maria Orlova; Russia | 1:49.71 (54.80 / 54.91) (55.00 / 54.71) |
| Königssee | Noelle Pikus-Pace; United States | 52.92 | Janine Flock; Austria | 53.36 | Shelley Rudman; United Kingdom | 53.42 |

== Standings ==
=== Men ===
| Pos. | Racer | (Canada) CAL | (United States) PKC | (United States) LKP | (Germany) WIN | (Switzerland) STM1 | (Switzerland) STM2 | (Austria) IGL | (Germany) KON | Points |
|---|---|---|---|---|---|---|---|---|---|---|
| 1 | Martins Dukurs (LAT) | 1 | 2 | 8 | 1 | 1 | 1 | 1 | 1 | 1720 |
| 2 | Tomass Dukurs (LAT) | 4 | 6 | 3 | 2 | 2 | 2 | 3 | 2 | 1608 |
| 3 | Matthew Antoine (USA) | 7 | 3 | 1 | 4 | 3 | 6 | 6 | 4 | 1529 |
| 4 | Aleksandr Tretyakov (RUS) | 2 | 1 | 2 | 3 | 4 | 7 | 2 | – | 1415 |
| 5 | Frank Rommel (GER) | 11 | 5 | 5 | 7 | 10 | 13 | 9 | 3 | 1288 |
| 6 | Alexander Kroeckel (GER) | 18 | 7 | 9 | 10 | 8 | 8 | 14 | 5 | 1160 |
| 7 | John Fairbairn (CAN) | 9 | 8 | 6 | 9 | 6 | 3 | 13 | – | 1136 |
| 8 | John Daly (USA) | 16 | 16 | 4 | 5 | 23 | 9 | 5 | 12 | 1082 |
| 9 | Sergei Chudinov (RUS) | 14 | 4 | 10 | 6 | 20 | 4 | 4 | – | 1076 |
| 10 | Hiroatsu Takahashi (JPN) | 10 | 9 | 13 | 8 | 11 | 11 | 21 | 10 | 1054 |
| 11 | Kristan Bromley (GBR) | 15 | 17 | 18 | 13 | 7 | 5 | 18 | 6 | 1000 |
| 12 | Kyle Tress (USA) | 22 | 15 | 17 | 11 | 5 | 16 | 8 | 16 | 1000 |
| 13 | Dominic Parsons (GBR) | 3 | 10 | 11 | 11 | 21 | 25 | 11 | 14 | 966 |
| 14 | Eric Neilson (CAN) | 5 | 12 | 14 | 16 | 9 | 10 | 17 | – | 904 |
| 15 | Matthias Guggenberger (AUT) | 19 | 13 | 11 | 17 | 14 | 21 | 12 | 15 | 824 |
| 16 | Raphael Maier (AUT) | 13 | 11 | 15 | 14 | 17 | 22 | 14 | – | 728 |
| 17 | Yuki Sasahara (JPN) | 24 | 18 | 19 | 24 | 15 | 14 | 19 | 9 | 686 |
| 18 | Alexander Gassner (GER) | 8 | 14 | 23 | – | – | – | 16 | 8 | 578 |
| 19 | Lukas Kummer (SUI) | 12 | 22 | 27 | 19 | 25 | 15 | 22 | 23 | 540 |
| 20 | John Farrow (AUS) | 20 | 24 | 22 | 25 | 22 | 12 | 25 | 17 | 521 |
| 21 | Ed Smith (GBR) | 27 | 26 | 24 | 22 | 12 | 19 | 10 | – | 515 |
| 22 | Dave Greszczyszyn (CAN) | 6 | 20 | 26 | 20 | – | – | – | 11 | 484 |
| 23 | Ander Mirambell (ESP) | 25 | 23 | 25 | 27 | 16 | 17 | 23 | 26 | 432 |
| 24 | Ben Sandford (NZL) | 23 | 21 | 16 | 17 | 19 | 28 | 28 | – | 426 |
| 25 | Alexandros Kefalas (GRE) | – | – | – | 23 | 18 | 20 | 20 | 21 | 328 |
| 26 | Sean Greenwood (IRL) | 17 | 19 | 20 | – | – | – | – | 20 | 298 |
| 27 | Christopher Grotheer (GER) | – | – | – | 15 | 12 | 23 | – | – | 282 |
| 28 | Jon Montgomery (CAN) | – | – | – | – | 29 | 18 | 7 | – | 272 |
| 29 | Maurizio Oioli (ITA) | 25 | 25 | 21 | – | – | – | – | 12 | 270 |
| 30 | Yves Pascal Oswald (SUI) | 21 | 27 | – | – | 24 | 27 | 26 | 24 | 252 |
| 31 | Joseph Luke Cecchini (ITA) | – | – | 16 | 21 | 28 | 29 | 27 | – | 242 |
| 32 | Anže Šetina (SLO) | – | – | – | 28 | 27 | 26 | – | 19 | 170 |
| 33 | Anton Batuev (RUS) | – | – | – | – | – | – | – | 7 | 168 |
| 34 | Mattia Gaspari (ITA) | – | – | – | 26 | 26 | 24 | 24 | – | 162 |
| 35 | Alexander Mutovin (RUS) | – | – | – | – | – | – | – | 18 | 80 |
| 36 | Patrick Rooney (CAN) | – | – | – | – | – | – | – | 22 | 56 |
| 37 | Giovanni Mulassano (ITA) | – | – | – | – | – | – | – | 25 | 40 |
| 38 | David Michael Swift (GBR) | – | – | – | – | – | – | – | 27 | 32 |
| 39 | Michael Höfer (SUI) | – | – | – | 29 | – | – | – | – | 24 |

=== Women ===
| Pos. | Racer | (Canada) CAL | (United States) PKC | (United States) LKP1 | (United States) LKP2 | (Germany) WIN | (Switzerland) STM | (Austria) IGL | (Germany) KON | Points |
|---|---|---|---|---|---|---|---|---|---|---|
| 1 | Lizzy Yarnold (GBR) | 1 | 2 | 3 | 1 | 1 | 2 | 1 | 9 | 1672 |
| 2 | Noelle Pikus-Pace (USA) | – | 1 | 1 | 3 | 2 | 1 | 2 | 1 | 1520 |
| 3 | Shelley Rudman (GBR) | 4 | 4 | 6 | 11 | 9 | 3 | 5 | 3 | 1432 |
| 4 | Janine Flock (AUT) | 7 | 16 | 13 | 2 | 5 | 4 | 3 | 2 | 1380 |
| 5 | Anja Huber (GER) | 5 | 7 | 2 | 14 | 13 | 13 | 10 | 5 | 1242 |
| 6 | Marion Thees (GER) | 14 | 12 | 5 | 6 | 4 | 15 | 15 | 8 | 1160 |
| 7 | Marina Gilardoni (SUI) | 11 | 15 | 9 | 5 | 14 | 12 | 9 | 9 | 1120 |
| 8 | Katharine Eustace (NZL) | 16 | 18 | 4 | 7 | 18 | 11 | 11 | 7 | 1056 |
| 9 | Michelle Steele (AUS) | 3 | 5 | 12 | – | 20 | 17 | 8 | 4 | 1020 |
| 10 | Maria Orlova (RUS) | 14 | 13 | 10 | 15 | 12 | 7 | 3 | – | 976 |
| 11 | Lucy Chaffer (AUS) | 9 | 8 | 11 | 16 | 21 | 16 | 13 | 12 | 950 |
| 12 | Katie Uhlaender (USA) | 12 | 14 | 14 | 9 | – | 6 | 12 | 11 | 944 |
| 13 | Elena Nikitina (RUS) | 2 | 6 | 22 | 20 | 11 | 14 | 6 | – | 934 |
| 14 | Sarah Reid (CAN) | 6 | 3 | 14 | 12 | 3 | 19 | – | – | 890 |
| 15 | Olga Potylitsina (RUS) | – | – | 17 | 4 | 8 | 8 | 7 | – | 768 |
| 16 | Robynne Thompson (CAN) | 8 | 10 | 18 | 16 | 17 | 9 | – | – | 720 |
| 17 | Melissa Hollingsworth (CAN) | – | – | 8 | 8 | 6 | 5 | – | – | 680 |
| 18 | Sophia Griebel (GER) | – | – | – | – | 6 | 10 | 16 | 5 | 608 |
| 19 | Nozomi Komuro (JPN) | 20 | 20 | 20 | 18 | 19 | 22 | 18 | 14 | 606 |
| 20 | Katharina Heinz (GER) | 13 | 9 | 7 | 13 | – | – | – | – | 560 |
| 21 | Lelde Priedulēna (LAT) | 17 | 19 | 19 | 22 | 15 | 21 | 19 | – | 532 |
| 22 | Joska Le Conte (NED) | 21 | 22 | 21 | 21 | 22 | 18 | 20 | 19 | 520 |
| 23 | Rose McGrandle (GBR) | – | – | – | – | 10 | 23 | 14 | 13 | 426 |
| 24 | Donna Creighton (GBR) | 18 | 21 | 16 | 9 | – | – | – | – | 390 |
| 25 | Cassie Hawrysh (CAN) | 10 | 11 | – | – | – | – | 15 | 14 | 280 |
| 26 | Maria Marinela Mazilu (ROU) | 23 | 24 | – | – | 23 | 24 | 17 | – | 278 |
| 27 | Eiko Nakayama (JPN) | – | – | – | – | 24 | 20 | 21 | 16 | 271 |
| 28 | Takako Omukai (JPN) | 19 | 23 | 23 | 19 | – | – | – | – | 248 |
| 29 | Olga Nikandrova (RUS) | 22 | 17 | – | – | – | – | – | 17 | 232 |
| 30 | Elina Galieva (RUS) | – | – | – | – | – | – | – | 15 | 104 |
| 31 | Anne O'Shea (USA) | – | – | – | – | 16 | – | – | – | 96 |
| 32 | Jane Channell (CAN) | – | – | – | – | – | – | – | 18 | 80 |
| 33 | Anastasia Novikova (RUS) | – | – | – | – | – | – | – | 20 | 68 |

== See also ==
- Skeleton at the 2014 Winter Olympics
