= 2011–12 Skeleton World Cup =

Winners
- Men's singles: Martins Dukurs (LAT)
- Women's singles: Shelley Rudman (GBR)

Competitions
- Venues: 8

The 2011–12 Skeleton World Cup is a multi race tournament over a season for skeleton. The season started on 2 December 2011 in Igls, Austria and ended on 11 February 2012 in Calgary, Alberta, Canada. The World Cup is organised by the FIBT who also run World Cups and Championships in bobsleigh. This season is sponsored by Viessmann.

== Calendar ==
Below is the schedule of the 2011/12 season

Venue	Date	Details
(Austria) Igls	2–4 December 2011	
(France) La Plagne	9–11 December 2011	
(Germany) Winterberg	16–18 December 2011	
(Germany) Altenberg	6–8 January 2012	Also serves as FIBT European Championship
(Germany) Königssee	13–15 January 2012	
(Switzerland) St. Moritz	20–22 January 2012	
(Canada) Whistler	2–4 February 2012	
(Canada) Calgary	9–11 February 2012	

== Results ==
=== Men ===
Event:	Gold:	Time	Silver:	Time	Bronze:	Time
Igls	Martins Dukurs; Latvia	1:45.64 (52.69 / 52.95)	Aleksandr Tretyakov; Russia	1:46.74 (53.25 / 53.49)	Tomass Dukurs; Latvia	1:46.77 (53.22 / 53.55)
La Plagne	Martins Dukurs; Latvia	2:01.25 (1:00.51 / 1:00.74)	Tomass Dukurs; Latvia	2:02.23 (1:01.01 / 1:01.22)	Aleksandr Tretyakov; Russia	2:02.42 (1:01.09 / 1:01.33)
Winterberg	Martins Dukurs; Latvia	57.90	Frank Rommel; Germany	58.22	Aleksandr Tretyakov; Russia	58.29
Altenberg	Martins Dukurs; Latvia	1:54.15 (57.18 / 56.97)	Tomass Dukurs; Latvia	1:55.22 (57.95 / 57.27)	Alexander Kröckel; Germany	1:55.82 (58.07 / 57.75)
Königssee	Frank Rommel; Germany	1:42.94 (51.23 / 51.71)	Alexander Kröckel; Germany	1:43.76 (52.11 / 51.65)	Matthias Guggenberger; Austria	1:43.86 (51.97 / 51.89)
St. Moritz	Martins Dukurs; Latvia	2:17.45 (1:08.87 / 1:08.58)	Ben Sandford; New Zealand	2:19.21 (1:09.72 / 1:09.49)	Matthew Antoine; United States	2:19.27 (1:09.73 / 1:09.54)
Whistler	Martins Dukurs; Latvia	1:45.76 (52.70 / 53.06)	Frank Rommel; Germany	1:46.51 (53.17 / 53.34)		
Whistler	Martins Dukurs; Latvia	1:45.76 (52.70 / 53.06)	Aleksandr Tretyakov; Russia	1:46.51 (53.23 / 53.28)		
Calgary	Martins Dukurs; Latvia	1:51.88 (55.76 / 56.12)	Aleksandr Tretyakov; Russia	1:52.56 (55.87 / 56.69)	Frank Rommel; Germany	1:53.28 (56.33 / 56.95)

=== Women ===
Event:	Gold:	Time	Silver:	Time	Bronze:	Time
Igls	Olga Potylitsina; Russia	1:49.39 (54.71 / 54.68)	Emma Lincoln-Smith; Australia	1:49.62 (54.66 / 54.96)	Mellisa Hollingsworth; Canada	1:49.66 (54.76 / 54.90)
La Plagne	Mellisa Hollingsworth; Canada	2:06.09 (1:03.00 / 1:03.09)	Anne O'Shea; United States	2:06.46 (1:03.27 / 1:03.19)	Katie Uhlaender; United States	2:06.64 (1:03.43 / 1:03.21)
Winterberg	Amy Gough; Canada	1:00.16	Katharina Heinz; Germany	1:00.24	Marion Thees; Germany	1:00.26
Altenberg	Anja Huber; Germany	59.87	Katharina Heinz; Germany	59.97	Shelley Rudman; Great Britain	59.99
Königssee	Shelley Rudman; Great Britain	1:46.15 (53.26 / 52.89)	Marion Thees; Germany	1:46.65 (53.41 / 53.24)	Mellisa Hollingsworth; Canada	1:47.19 (53.77 / 53.42)
St. Moritz	Elizabeth Yarnold; Great Britain	1:11.93	Shelley Rudman; Great Britain	1:12.18	Katharina Heinz; Germany	1:12.22
Whistler	Mellisa Hollingsworth; Canada	1:49.79 (55.09 / 54.70)	Lucy Chaffer; Australia	1:49.96 (55.16 / 54.80)	Shelley Rudman; Great Britain	1:50.36 (55.19 / 55.17)
Calgary	Elizabeth Yarnold; Great Britain	1:55.93 (58.03 / 57.90)	Anja Huber; Germany	1:56.47 (58.29 / 58.18)	Shelley Rudman; Great Britain	1:56.57 (58.29 / 58.28)
Calgary	Elizabeth Yarnold; Great Britain	1:55.93 (58.03 / 57.90)	Anja Huber; Germany	1:56.47 (58.29 / 58.18)	Amy Gough; Canada	1:56.57 (58.41 / 58.16)

== Standings ==
=== Men ===
Pos.	Bobsledder	IGL	ALB	WIN	ALT	KON	SMO	WHI	CAL	Points
1.	Martins Dukurs (LAT)	1	1	1	1	6	1	1	1	1751
2.	Frank Rommel (GER)	4	5	2	4	1	4	2	3	1605
3.	Tomass Dukurs (LAT)	3	2	7	2	7	4	5	4	1524
4.	Aleksandr Tretyakov (RUS)	2	3	3	6	5	22	2	2	1446
5.	Alexander Kröckel (GER)	6	7	8	3	2	19	4	8	1340
6.	Alexander Gassner (GER)	9	8	6	5	11	10	7	10	1264
7.	Kristan Bromley (GBR)	5	6	4	14	9	7	9	14	1248
8.	Sergei Chudinov (RUS)	10	9	11	7	10	14	13	7	1144
9.	Matthew Antoine (USA)	10	4	19	21	4	3	14	9	1128
9.	Matthias Guggenberger (AUT)	16	13	13	9	3	11	6	12	1128
11.	John Fairbairn (CAN)	15	14	17	10	12	9	8	13	1008
12.	Michael Douglas (CAN)	7	10	9	12	16	17	11	18	992
13.	Adam Pengilly (GBR)	14	15	12	8	7	20	10	15	988
14.	Eric Neilson (CAN)	7	20	5	13	20	18	19	6	938
15.	Raphael Maier (AUT)	16	18	21	11	13	12	16	15	822
16.	Hiroatsu Takahashi (JPN)	18	12	16	17	19	16	18	17	730
17.	Ben Sandford (NZL)	—	—	—	15	14	2	12	11	690
18.	John Daly (USA)	dsq	22	14	24	17	6	—	5	661
19.	Maurizio Oioli (ITA)	19	16	18	18	18	22	21	19	602
20.	Kyle Tress (USA)	23	17	23	22	25	8	15	—	548

=== Women ===
Pos.	Bobsledder	IGL	ALB	WIN	ALT	KON	SMO	WHI	CAL	Points
1.	Shelley Rudman (GBR)	5	6	14	3	1	2	3	3	1507
2.	Marion Thees (GER)	9	5	3	4	2	4	5	10	1458
3.	Anja Huber (GER)	4	4	22	1	4	5	4	2	1443
4.	Mellisa Hollingsworth (CAN)	3	1	13	5	3	16	1	5	1434
5.	Katharina Heinz (GER)	13	11	2	2	6	3	8	13	1332
6.	Amy Gough (CAN)	11	12	1	7	11	8	7	3	1321
7.	Lucy Chaffer (AUS)	6	14	—	10	7	10	2	5	1138
8.	Anne O'Shea (USA)	7	2	9	12	18	18	9	9	1122
9.	Emma Lincoln-Smith (AUS)	2	13	11	8	8	12	17	14	1114
10.	Sarah Reid (CAN)	10	8	8	14	17	16	6	7	1104
11.	Katie Uhlaender (USA)	—	3	5	6	5	13	—	8	1024
12.	Maria Orlova (RUS)	16	15	10	13	12	9	20	17	900
13.	Janine Flock (AUT)	8	9	20	21	10	21	13	15	872
14.	Olga Potylitsina (RUS)	1	7	4	16	dnf	—	—	11	817
15.	Olga Nikandrova (RUS)	21	10	16	17	13	11	18	19	800
16.	Katharine Eustace (NZL)	—	—	19	9	9	5	15	12	794
17.	Nozomi Komuro (JPN)	18	17	7	18	21	20	12	16	770
18.	Joska Le Conté (NED)	15	18	12	11	22	22	14	21	734
19.	Elizabeth Yarnold (GBR)	—	—	—	—	14	1	9	1	714
20.	Kimber Gabryszak (USA)	20	16	17	14	15	7	19	—	710

== See also ==
- FIBT World Championships 2012
