= 2012–13 Skeleton World Cup =

Winners
- Men's singles: Martins Dukurs (LAT)
- Women's singles: Marion Thees (GER)

Competitions
- Venues: 9

The 2012–13 Skeleton World Cup was a multi-race tournament over a season for skeleton. The season started on 8 November 2012 in Lake Placid, New York, United States, and ended on 17 February 2013 in Sochi, Russia. The World Cup is organised by the FIBT who also run World Cups and Championships in bobsleigh. This season was sponsored by Viessmann.

== Calendar ==
Below is the schedule of the 2012–13 season

Venue	Date	Details
(United States) Lake Placid	8–10 November 2012	
(United States) Park City	16–18 November 2012	
(Canada) Whistler	23–25 November 2012	
(Germany) Winterberg	7–9 December 2012	
(France) La Plagne	14–16 December 2012	
(Germany) Altenberg	4–6 January 2013	
(Germany) Königssee	11–13 January 2013	
(Austria) Igls	18–20 January 2013	Also serves as FIBT European Championship
(Russia) Sochi	15–17 February 2013	

== Results ==
=== Men ===
Event:	Gold:	Time	Silver:	Time	Bronze:	Time
Lake Placid	Martins Dukurs; Latvia	2:41.48 (53.69 / 54.02 / 53.77)	Tomass Dukurs; Latvia	2:41.56 (53.84 / 53.93 / 53.79)	Aleksandr Tretyakov; Russia	2:41.65 (53.91 / 53.81 / 53.93)
Park City	Martins Dukurs; Latvia	1:39.71 (49.75 / 49.96)	Alexander Kröckel; Germany	1:39.76 (49.81 / 49.95)	Aleksandr Tretyakov; Russia	1:39.82 (49.81 / 50.01)
Whistler	Frank Rommel; Germany	1:47.19 (53.70 / 53.49)	Martins Dukurs; Latvia	1:47.40 (53.62 / 53.78)	Tomass Dukurs; Latvia	1:47.64 (53.90 / 53.74)
Winterberg	Martins Dukurs; Latvia	1:52.71 (56.35 / 56.36)	Aleksandr Tretyakov; Russia	1:52.87 (56.49 / 56.38)	Christopher Grotheer; Germany	1:53.61 (56.87 / 56.74)
La Plagne	Martins Dukurs; Latvia	2:02.00 (1:00.80 / 1:01.20)	Aleksandr Tretyakov; Russia	2:02.54 (1:01.08 / 1:01.46)	Tomass Dukurs; Latvia	2:02.92 (1:01.35 / 1:01.57)
Altenberg	Martins Dukurs; Latvia	1:58.44 (58.96 / 59.48)	Alexander Kröckel; Germany	1:58.92 (59.21 / 59.71)	Frank Rommel; Germany	1:59.36 (59.51 / 59.85)
Königssee	Martins Dukurs; Latvia	1:42.07 (50.93 / 51.14)	Frank Rommel; Germany	1:42.54 (51.35 / 51.19)	Aleksandr Tretyakov; Russia	1:42.77 (51.44 / 51.33)
Igls	Martins Dukurs; Latvia	1:45.13 (52.68 / 52.45)	Aleksandr Tretyakov; Russia	1:45.88 (53.06 / 52.82)	Tomass Dukurs; Latvia	1:46.48 (53.46 / 53.02)
Sochi	Martins Dukurs; Latvia	1:54.12 (56.90 / 57.22)	Aleksandr Tretyakov; Russia	1:54.29 (57.07 / 57.22)	Frank Rommel; Germany	1:55.52 (57.65 / 57.87)

=== Women ===
Event:	Gold:	Time	Silver:	Time	Bronze:	Time
Lake Placid	Sarah Reid; Canada	2:47.70 (55.84 / 55.88 / 55.98)	Mellisa Hollingsworth; Canada	2:47.73 (55.85 / 55.89 / 55.99)	Marion Thees; Germany	2:47.83 (55.97 / 56.05 / 55.81)
Park City	Katie Uhlaender; United States	1:40.93 (50.48 / 50.45)	Elizabeth Yarnold; Great Britain	1:40.94 (50.36 / 50.58)	Anja Huber; Germany	1:41.21 (50.66 / 50.55)
Whistler	Marion Thees; Germany	1:50.92 (55.39 / 55.53)	Sarah Reid; Canada	1:51.09 (55.45 / 55.64)	Elizabeth Yarnold; Great Britain	1:51.17 (55.70 / 55.47)
Winterberg	Shelley Rudman; Great Britain	1:56.30 (58.06 / 58.24)	Anja Huber; Germany	1:57.29 (58.59 / 58.70)	Noelle Pikus-Pace; United States	1:57.40 (58.81 / 58.59)
La Plagne	Katie Uhlaender; United States	2:08.22 (1:03.98 / 1:04.24)	Sarah Reid; Canada	2:08.71 (1:04.21 / 1:04.50)		
La Plagne	Katie Uhlaender; United States	2:08.22 (1:03.98 / 1:04.24)	Marion Thees; Germany	2:08.71 (1:04.29 / 1:04.42)		
Altenberg	Marion Thees; Germany	2:02.59 (1:00.35 / 1:02.24)	Katie Uhlaender; United States	2:02.60 (1:00.12 / 1:02.48)	Noelle Pikus-Pace; United States	2:02.87 (1:00.40 / 1:02.47)
Königssee	Noelle Pikus-Pace; United States	1:47.51 (54.17 / 53.34)	Marion Thees; Germany	1:47.92 (54.29 / 53.63)	Anja Huber; Germany	1:48.03 (54.47 / 53.56)
Igls	Elena Nikitina; Russia	1:50.46 (55.27 / 55.19)	Noelle Pikus-Pace; United States	1:50.73 (55.32 / 55.41)	Maria Orlova; Russia	1:51.06 (55.48 / 55.58)
Sochi	Noelle Pikus-Pace; United States	1:58.91 (59.15 / 59.76)	Katie Uhlaender; United States	1:59.02 (58.98 / 1:00.04)	Anja Huber; Germany	1:59.78 (59.45 / 1:00.33)

== Standings ==
=== Men ===
Pos.	Bobsledder	LKP	PKC	WHI	WIN	LPL	ALT	KON	IGL	SOC	Points
1	Martins Dukurs (LAT)	1	1	2	1	1	1	1	1	1	2010
2	Tomass Dukurs (LAT)	2	4	3	5	3	4	5	3	5	1746
3	Alexander Kröckel (GER)	7	2	7	6	5	2	4	9	6	1636
4	Aleksandr Tretyakov (RUS)	3	3	4	2	2	–	3	2	2	1632
5	Frank Rommel (GER)	DSQ	5	1	7	12	3	2	5	3	1499
6	Eric Neilson (CAN)	16	6	5	8	8	14	8	6	10	1368
7	Kristan Bromley (GBR)	6	11	6	4	6	6	18	10	15	1360
8	Christopher Grotheer (GER)	15	12	13	3	–	5	9	7	7	1232
9	John Daly (USA)	4	7	19	11	9	20	11	16	4	1214
10	Jon Montgomery (CAN)	12	14	12	29	9	9	6	8	12	1160
11	John Fairbairn (CAN)	11	10	8	18	13	11	15	15	9	1136
12	Matthew Antoine (USA)	10	9	15	15	7	–	17	17	11	984
13	Ed Smith (GBR)	13	16	18	12	14	10	19	14	14	978
14	Sergey Chudinov (RUS)	—	8	9	10	4	—	16	4	—	936
15	Hiroatsu Takahashi (JPN)	17	13	20	17	11	18	13	12	20	896
16	Ben Sandford (NZL)	8	DNS	10	9	20	7	–	–	8	852
17	Kyle Tress (USA)	5	20	24	13	15	21	21	19	13	839
18	Matthias Guggenberger (AUT)	19	18	14	25	21	16	10	18	19	762
19	Maurizio Oioli (ITA)	9	21	11	19	16	13	14	–	–	752
20	Raphael Maier (AUT)	14	22	17	16	–	15	11	20	18	740

=== Women ===
Pos.	Bobsledder	LKP	PKC	WHI	WIN	LPL	ALT	KON	IGL	SOC	Points
1	Marion Thees (GER)	3	5	1	9	2	1	2	18	4	1678
2	Anja Huber (GER)	8	3	8	2	4	5	3	7	3	1674
3	Katie Uhlaender (USA)	5	1	7	21	1	2	9	10	2	1580
4	Elizabeth Yarnold (GBR)	9	2	3	4	8	4	11	9	9	1546
5	Sarah Reid (CAN)	1	11	2	6	2	18	5	4	—	1413
6	Mellisa Hollingsworth (CAN)	2	7	5	8	7	19	4	12	14	1396
7	Shelley Rudman (GBR)	7	5	9	1	10	16	7	11	13	1393
8	Cassie Hawrysh (CAN)	11	4	4	7	13	8	14	17	16	1264
9	Michelle Steele (AUS)	12	—	14	5	9	10	7	4	8	1240
10	Lucy Chaffer (AUS)	6	8	13	12	5	13	15	13	12	1240
11	Noelle Pikus-Pace (USA)	—	—	6	3	—	3	1	2	1	1236
12	Janine Flock (AUT)	15	10	22	11	11	6	10	4	11	1224
13	Maria Orlova (RUS)	17	17	12	15	12	—	13	3	7	1024
14	Olga Potylitsina (RUS)	14	18	18	18	6	—	16	7	6	968
15	Katharine Eustace (NZL)	16	14	16	13	15	16	16	16	17	904
16	Donna Creighton (GBR)	4	11	17	22	19	7	—	15	19	892
17	Joska Le Conté (NED)	18	19	11	19	17	15	21	19	21	754
18	Elena Nikitina (RUS)	—	—	—	10	—	—	12	1	5	681
19	Lelde Priedulena (LAT)	21	16	20	20	—	12	20	21	15	656
20	Marina Gilardoni (SUI)	19	20	21	17	16	—	18	22	20	592

== See also ==
- FIBT World Championships 2013
