= 2010–11 Skeleton World Cup =

Winners
- Men's singles: Martins Dukurs (LAT)
- Women's singles: Anja Huber (GER)

Competitions
- Venues: 9

The 2010–11 Skeleton World Cup was a multi race tournament over a season for bob skeleton. The season started on 25 November 2010 in Whistler, Canada, and ended on 4 February 2011 in Cesana, Italy. The World Cup was organised by the FIBT who also ran world cups and championships in bobsleigh. This season was sponsored by Viessmann.

== Calendar ==
Below is the schedule of the 2010/11 season.

Venue	Date	Details
Whistler	25–26 November 2010	
Calgary	2 December 2010	
Park City	9 December 2010	
Lake Placid	17 December 2010	
Igls	14–15 January 2011	
Winterberg	22–23 January 2011	Also serves as FIBT European Championships
St. Moritz	28 January 2011	
Cesana	4 February 2011	

== Results ==
=== Men ===
Event:	Gold:	Time	Silver:	Time	Bronze:	Time
Whistler	Jon Montgomery (CAN)	1:47.56 (53.84 / 53.72)	Kristan Bromley (GBR)	1:47.84 (54.27 / 53.57)	Aleksandr Tretyakov (RUS)	1:47.88 (54.07 / 53.81)
Calgary	Martins Dukurs (LAT)	1:52.14 (56.10 / 56.04)	Aleksandr Tretyakov (RUS)	1:52.23 (56.17 / 56.06)	Kristan Bromley (GBR)	1:52.98 (56.54 / 56.44)
Park City	Aleksandr Tretyakov (RUS)	1:38.48 (49.37 / 49.11)	Sandro Stielicke (GER)	1:38.49 (49.17 / 49.32)	Martins Dukurs (LAT)	1:38.50 (49.24 / 49.26)
Lake Placid	Sergey Chudinov (RUS)	1:48.51 (54.21 / 54.30)	Martins Dukurs (LAT)	1:48.55 (54.15 / 54.40)	Kristan Bromley (GBR)	1:48.74 (54.25 / 54.49)
Igls	Martins Dukurs (LAT)	1:45.95 (52.95 / 53.00)	Sergey Chudinov (RUS)	1:46.75 (53.41 / 53.34)	Aleksandr Tretyakov (RUS)	1:46.89 (53.55 / 53.34)
Winterberg	Martins Dukurs (LAT)	1:55.41 (57.48 / 57.93)	Sergey Chudinov (RUS)	1:55.61 (57.55 / 58.06)	Aleksandr Tretyakov (RUS)	1:55.71 (57.78 / 57.93)
St. Moritz	Martins Dukurs (LAT)	2:16.54 (1:08.63 / 1:07.91)	Frank Rommel (GER)	2:16.89 (1:08.58 / 1:08.31)	Ben Sandford (NZL)	2:17.34 (1:08.66 / 1:08.68)
Cesana	Martins Dukurs (LAT)	1:53.06 (56.39 / 56.67)	Tomass Dukurs (LAT)	1:54.27 (56.99 / 57.28)	Sandro Stielicke (GER)	1:54.32 (57.10 / 57.22)

Notes

- Note 1: Ben Sandford's bronze medal at the St. Moritz World Cup race was New Zealand's first ever World Cup medal.

=== Women ===
Event:	Gold:	Time	Silver:	Time	Bronze:	Time
Whistler	Marion Thees (GER)	1:48.98 (54.44 / 54.54)	Mellisa Hollingsworth (CAN)	1:49.40 (54.68 / 54.72)	Anja Huber (GER)	1:50.07 (55.24 / 54.83)
Calgary	Anja Huber (GER)	1:55.84 (57.93 / 57.91)	Shelley Rudman (GBR)	1:56.61 (58.15 / 58.46)	Amy Gough (CAN)	1:56.89 (58.35 / 58.54)
Park City	Anja Huber (GER)	1:40.62 (50.58 / 50.04)	Shelley Rudman (GBR)	1:40.80 (50.47 / 50.33)	Amy Gough (CAN)	1:41.02 (50.68 / 50.34)
Lake Placid	Marion Thees (GER)	1:51.95 (55.86 / 56.09)	Shelley Rudman (GBR)	1:52.28 (56.17 / 56.11)	Anja Huber (GER)	1:52.48 (56.06 / 56.42)
Igls	Anja Huber (GER)	1:51.10 (55.34 / 55.76)	Shelley Rudman (GBR)	1:51.27 (55.69 / 55.58)	Mellisa Hollingsworth (CAN)	1:51.45 (55.70 / 55.75)
Winterberg	Shelley Rudman (GBR)	1:57.77 (58.75 / 59.02)	Anja Huber (GER)	1:57.99 (58.90 / 59.09)	Amy Gough (CAN)	1:58.52 (59.21 / 59.31)
St. Moritz	Shelley Rudman (GBR)	2:19.17 (1:09.76 / 1:09.41)	Mellisa Hollingsworth (CAN)	2:19.41 (1:09.85 / 1:09.56)	Anja Huber (GER)	2:19.43 (1:10.00 / 1:09.43)
Cesana	Anja Huber (GER)	1:56.71 (58.35 / 58.36)	Marion Thees (GER)	1:56.77 (58.46 / 58.31)	Darla Deschamps (CAN)	1:57.07 (58.48 / 58.59)

== Standings ==
=== Men ===
Pos.	Bobsledder	WHI	CAL	PKC	LKP	IGL	WIN	SMO	CES	Points
1.	Martins Dukurs (LAT)	5	1	3	2	1	1	1	1	1719
2.	Sandro Stielicke (GER)	7	5	2	6	7	7	4	3	1466
3.	Frank Rommel (GER)	9	7	11	5	5	5	2	4	1410
4.	Sergey Chudinov (RUS)	8	6	12	1	2	2	19	7	1351
5.	Aleksandr Tretyakov (RUS)	3	2	1	13	3	3	23	10	1349
6.	Michi Halilovic (GER)	4	8	5	7	10	11	12	6	1288
7.	Matthew Antoine (USA)	6	4	9	4	4	8	27	9	1248
8.	Tomass Dukurs (LAT)	10	25	7	8	8	4	7	2	1242
9.	Jon Montgomery (CAN)	1	11	10	14	6	13	8	11	1209
10.	John Daly (USA)	19	10	8	10	16	6	5	18	1058
11.	Chris Type (GBR)	16	9	6	9	18	12	9	14	1048
12.	Kristan Bromley (GBR)	2	3	4	3	dns	—	14	15	1018
13.	John Fairbairn (CAN)	11	12	14	16	17	14	10	12	944
14.	Michael Douglas (CAN)	13	13	13	11	19	dsq	6	7	914
15.	Matthias Guggenberger (AUT)	17	16	15	15	9	19	15	—	722
16.	Anže Šetina (SLO)	24	17	22	17	12	15	17	13	717
17.	Ben Sandford (NZL)	12	dns	—	dns	15	—	3	5	616
18.	Hiroatsu Takahashi (JPN)	21	20	19	21	20	15	16	20	602
19.	Ander Mirambell (ESP)	14	22	17	19	24	18	24	23	550
20.	Shinsuke Tayama (JPN)	18	21	18	22	21	20	26	19	518

=== Women ===
Pos.	Bobsledder	WHI	CAL	PKC	LKP	IGL	WIN	SMO	CES	Points
1.	Anja Huber (GER)	3	1	1	3	1	2	3	1	1710
2.	Shelley Rudman (GBR)	5	2	2	2	2	1	1	7	1642
3.	Mellisa Hollingsworth (CAN)	2	4	4	5	3	6	2	9	1516
4.	Marion Thees (GER)	1	5	7	1	10	7	7	2	1492
5.	Amy Gough (CAN)	6	3	3	12	8	3	8	6	1400
6.	Donna Creighton (GBR)	4	8	5	6	6	9	20	4	1300
7.	Katharina Heinz (GER)	8	5	10	11	11	13	15	5	1168
8.	Emma Lincoln-Smith (AUS)	10	9	6	9	7	15	13	11	1152
9.	Olga Potylitsina (RUS)	17	15	19	8	4	8	9	23	980
10.	Nozomi Komuro (JPN)	11	18	11	4	17	11	17	14	968
11.	Anne O'Shea (USA)	15	13	13	10	13	12	11	17	960
12.	Janine Flock (AUT)	13	12	8	16	18	16	16	16	872
13.	Katharine Eustace (NZL)	—	11	16	14	9	—	6	13	792
14.	Lucy Katherine Chaffer (AUS)	12	17	15	17	20	14	18	15	780
15.	Darla Deschamps (CAN)	—	—	—	—	5	4	4	3	768
16.	Joska Le Conté (NED)	14	14	18	20	15	18	13	20	744
17.	Amy Williams (GBR)	—	—	—	—	12	5	10	8	616
18.	Sarah Reid (CAN)	7	7	9	13	—	—	—	—	608
19.	Svetlana Trunova (RUS)	9	10	12	7	—	—	—	—	592
20.	Kimber Gabryszak (USA)	16	16	14	15	16	19	—	—	578
