= Aleksandr Tretyakov (skeleton racer) =

Russian skeleton racer

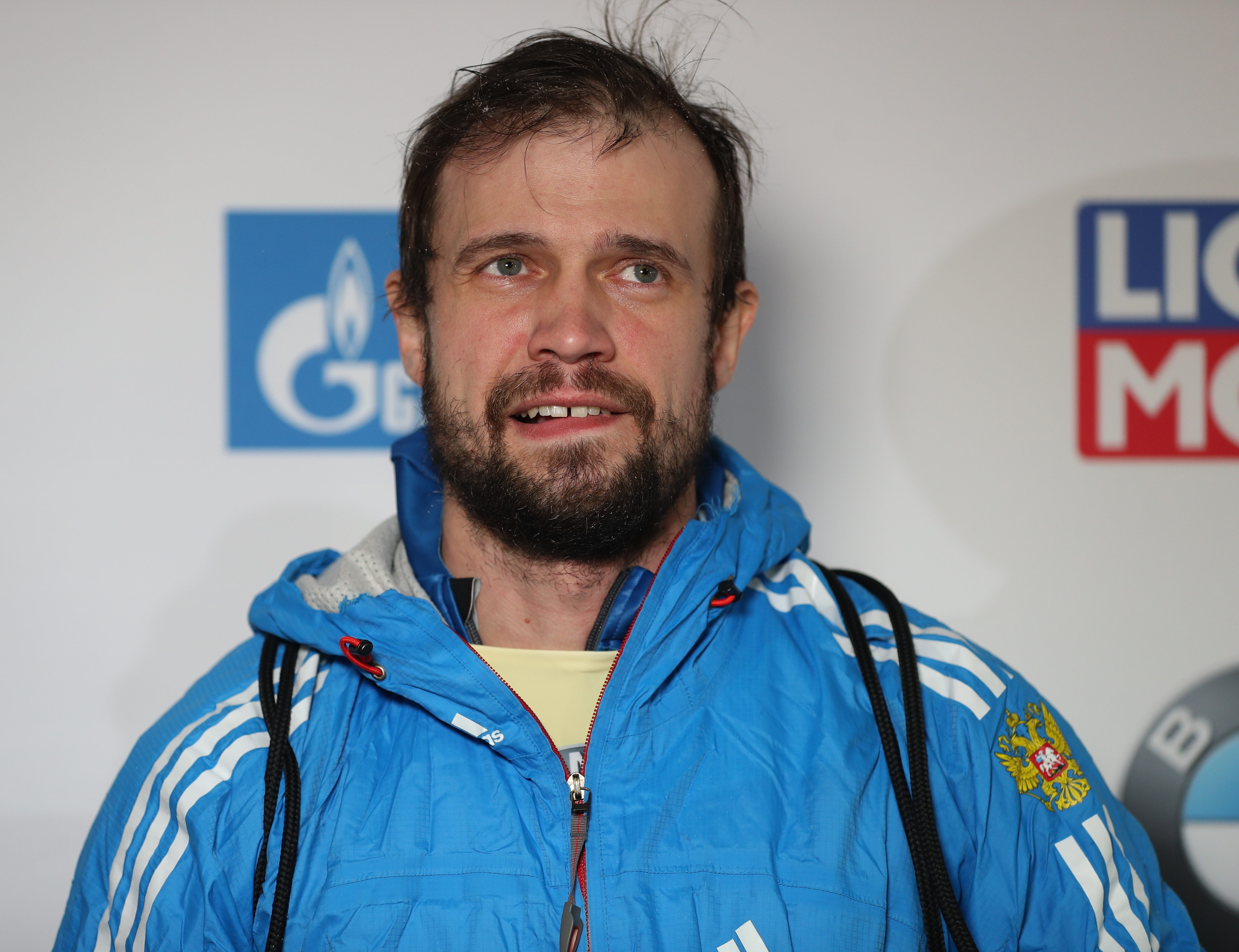
- Aleksandr Tretyakov at the Skeleton World Cup 2018/19 in Altenberg

Personal information
- Full name: Aleksandr Vladimirovich Tretyakov
- Nationality: Russian
- Born: 19 April 1985 (age 41) Krasnoyarsk, Russian SFSR, Soviet Union
- Height: 1.86 m (6 ft 1 in)
- Weight: 84 kg (185 lb)

Sport
- Country: Russia
- Sport: Skeleton
Medal record
Representing Russia
Olympic Games
Gold medal – first place	2014 Sochi	Men
Bronze medal – third place	2010 Vancouver	Men
World Championships
Gold medal – first place	2013 St. Moritz	Men
Silver medal – second place	2011 Königssee	Men
Silver medal – second place	2015 Winterberg	Men
Silver medal – second place	2016 Igls	Men
Bronze medal – third place	2009 Lake Placid	Men
European Championships
Gold medal – first place	2007 Königssee	Men
Gold medal – first place	2021 Winterberg	Men
Silver medal – second place	2013 Igls	Men
Silver medal – second place	2015 La Plagne	Men
Bronze medal – third place	2010 Igls	Men
Bronze medal – third place	2011 Winterberg	Men
Bronze medal – third place	2017 Winterberg	Men
Bronze medal – third place	2019 Igls	Men
Representing Bobsleigh Federation of Russia
World Championships
Silver medal – second place	2021 Altenberg	Men
Bronze medal – third place	2021 Altenberg	Mixed team

Aleksandr Vladimirovich Tretyakov (Russian: Александр Владимирович Третьяков; born 19 April 1985) is a Russian skeleton rider. Tretyakov is Olympic champion (2014), World champion (2013), European champion (2007) as well as two-times winner of the Skeleton World Cup, which he won in 2008–09 and 2018–19.

== Career ==
Tretyakov is the first Russian who won the World Championships (2013 in St. Moritz), the overall Skeleton World Cup (2008–09) and an Olympics bronze medal (at the 2010 Winter Olympics). He is the silver medalist of the 2011 World Championships in Königssee and 2015 World Championships in Winterberg, as well as of bronze medalist of the 2009 World Championships in Lake Placid (men's skeleton event) and 2015 World Championships in Winterberg (mixed team). In 2013 in St. Moritz, he became the world champion.

At the 2014 Winter Olympics in Sochi, Tretyakov won three out of four runs, established track (55.95) and start (4.47) records, and became the champion ahead of Martins Dukurs, who was universally considered to be the strongest gold medal contender. This was the first gold medal in skeleton for Russia. To sleep well before the second day of the competitions, Tretyakov downloaded on his cell phone the series of Russian Wikipedia articles on the economy of the Tsardom of Russia and fell asleep while reading them.

Tretyakov resides in Krasnoyarsk, Russia. His wife Anastasia is a former skeleton rider. Their daughter was born in 2013.

== Controversy ==
Tretyakov's bottles of urine had scratch marks so he was provisionally suspended in 2016. On 22 November 2017, he was disqualified from the 2014 Winter Olympics and had his gold medal stripped from him. On 1 February 2018, the ban was overturned and his results were restored as a result of the successful appeal.

== World Cup results ==
All results are sourced from the International Bobsleigh and Skeleton Federation (IBSF).

Season	1	2	3	4	5	6	7	8	9	Points	Place
2004–05	WIN; 32	ALT; 37	IGL; 19	SIG; 33	CES; 39	STM; 39	LKP; 26	—N/a	—N/a	23	34th
2005–06	CAL; 9	LKP; 29	IGL; 28	SIG; 10	KON; 38	STM; 32	ALT —	—N/a	—N/a	92	24th
2006–07	CAL; 2	PKC; 3	LKP; 15	NAG —	IGL; 1	CES —	WIN; 1	KON; 2	—N/a	487	3rd
2007–08	CAL; 10	PKC; 7	LKP; 19	CES1; 15	CES2; 12	STM; 22	KON; 13	WIN —	—N/a	794	16th
2008–09	WIN; 2	ALT; 9	IGL; 2	KON; 3	STM; 9	WHI; 9	PKC1; 1	PKC2; 1	—N/a	1526	1st
2009–10	PKC; 11	LKP; 7	CES; 15	WIN; 3	ALT; 2	KON; 12	STM; 9	IGL; 3	—N/a	1298	8th
2010–11	WHI; 3	CAL; 2	PKC; 1	LKP; 13	IGL; 3	WIN; 3	STM; 23	CES; 10	—N/a	1349	5th
2011–12	IGL; 2	LPL; 3	WIN; 3	ALT; 6	KON; 5	STM; 22	WHI; 2	CAL; 2	—N/a	1446	4th
2012–13	LKP; 3	PKC; 3	WHI; 4	WIN; 2	LPL; 2	ALT —	KON; 3	IGL; 2	SOC; 2	1632	4th
2013–14	CAL; 2	PKC; 1	LKP; 2	WIN; 3	STM1; 4	STM2; 7	IGL; 2	KON —	—N/a	1415	4th
2014–15	LKP —	CAL —	ALT; 3	KON; 1	STM; 10	LAP; 2	IGL; 2	SOC; 1	—N/a	1214	7th
2015–16	ALT; 2	WIN; 2	KON1; 2	LKP —	PKC —	WHI —	STM; 5	KON2 —	—N/a	814	12th
2016–17	WHI; 2	LKP; 1	ALT —	WIN; 3	STM; 4	KON; 1	IGL; 2	PYE; 4	—N/a	1454	3rd
2017–18	LKP; 3	PKC; 6	WHI —	WIN; 4	IGL; 34	ALT; 2	STM; 4	KON; 7	—N/a	1138	9th
2018–19	SIG; 4	WIN; 1	ALT; 1	KON; CNX	IGL; 4	STM; 2	LKP; 1	CAL1; 1	CAL2; 2	1719	1st
2019–20	LKP1; 3	LKP2; 1	WIN; 7	LPL; 1	IGL; 3	KON; 1	STM; 6	SIG; 5	—N/a	1603	2nd
2020–21	SIG 1; 9	SIG 2; 10	IGL 1; 1	IGL 2 —	WIN; 1	STM —	KON; 3	IGL 3; 1	—N/a	1171	5th
2021–22	IGL 1; 1	IGL 2; 9	ALT 1; 9	WIN; 1	ALT 2; 4	SIG —	WIN 2; 3	STM; 8	—N/a	1306	7th
