= Martins Dukurs =

Latvian skeleton racer (born 1984)

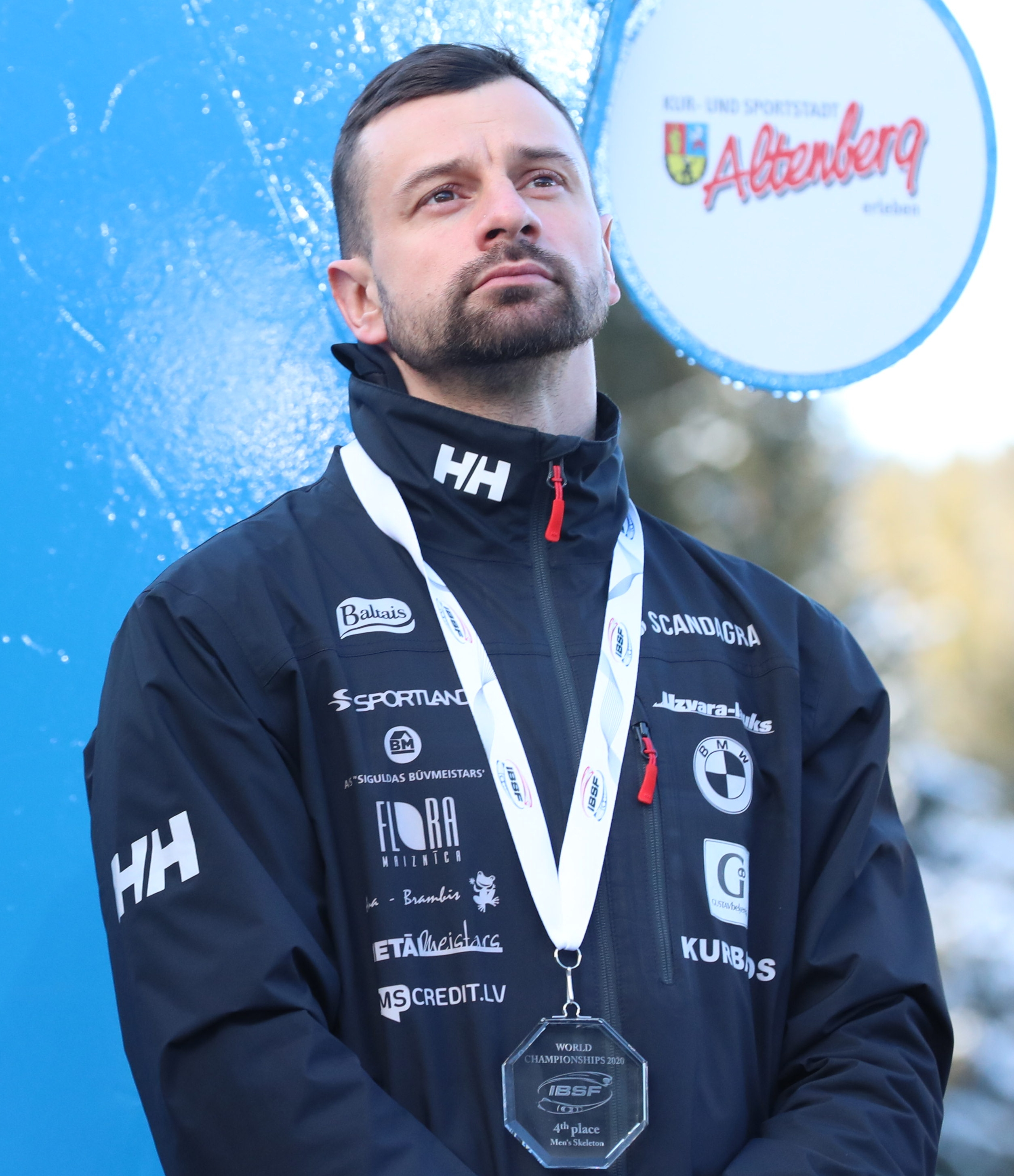
- Dukurs in 2020

Personal information
- Nationality: Latvian
- Born: 31 March 1984 (age 42) Rīga, Latvian SSR, Soviet Union
- Height: 1.79 m (5 ft 10 in)
- Weight: 77 kg (170 lb)

Sport
- Country: Latvia
- Sport: Skeleton
- Turned pro: 1998
Medal record
Olympic Games
Silver medal – second place	2010 Vancouver	Men
Silver medal – second place	2014 Sochi	Men
World Championships
Gold medal – first place	2011 Königssee	Men
Gold medal – first place	2012 Lake Placid	Men
Gold medal – first place	2015 Winterberg	Men
Gold medal – first place	2016 Igls	Men
Gold medal – first place	2017 Königssee	Men
Gold medal – first place	2019 Whistler	Men
Silver medal – second place	2013 St. Moritz	Men
European Championships
Gold medal – first place	2010 Igls	Men
Gold medal – first place	2011 Winterberg	Men
Gold medal – first place	2012 Altenberg	Men
Gold medal – first place	2013 Igls	Men
Gold medal – first place	2014 Königssee	Men
Gold medal – first place	2015 La Plagne	Men
Gold medal – first place	2016 St. Moritz	Men
Gold medal – first place	2017 Winterberg	Men
Gold medal – first place	2018 Igls	Men
Gold medal – first place	2019 Igls	Men
Gold medal – first place	2020 Sigulda	Men
Gold medal – first place	2022 St. Moritz	Men
Silver medal – second place	2021 Winterberg	Men

Martins Dukurs (born 31 March 1984) is a former Latvian skeleton racer, currently a coach, who has competed since 1998. He is a six-time world champion in men's skeleton, a double Olympic silver winner (at Vancouver 2010 and Sochi 2014), and the athlete with the most World Cup titles with a total of 11, having won eight consecutive titles between 2010 and 2017, plus another three consecutive titles between 2020 and 2022.

== Career ==
Dukurs finished seventh in the men's skeleton event at the 2006 Winter Olympics in Turin and sixth in the men's skeleton event at the 2007 FIBT World Championships in St. Moritz. He won the gold medal in the men's event at the 2011 FIBT World Championships, 2012 FIBT World Championships, 2015 FIBT World Championships, 2016 FIBT World Championships and 2017 FIBT World Championships.

Martins won the overall World Cup for the 2009–10, 2010–11, 2011–12, 2012–13, 2013–14, 2014–15, 2015–16 season, 2016–17 season and 2019–20 season.

At the end of the 2019–20 Skeleton World Cup season, he had 54 World Cup race victories.

His older brother Tomass is also a skeleton racer. Both he and his brother qualified for the 2010 Winter Olympics and the 2014 Winter Olympics. In 2010 Martins Dukurs was decorated with the Order of the Three Stars.

In November 2017, Sochi gold medalist Alexander Tretiakov was disqualified by the IOC, and his medal stripped from him; however, a decision on whether Martins Dukurs would be granted a gold medal was not made by the IBSF. He would have been the first-ever Latvian athlete to win gold at the Winter Olympics. However, Tretiakov would appeal against his disqualification to the Court of Arbitration for Sport, who overturned his disqualification and reinstated his gold medal.

On 19 January 2018, Martins was retroactively disqualified from the 2018 St. Moritz World Cup for having a too-hard sled.

Martins and Tomass' father, Dainis Dukurs, is a former bobsleigh brakeman, former manager of the Sigulda sledding track, sled designer, and coach of the Latvian skeleton team.

In August 2022, Dukurs was appointed a performance coach for the British national team. Under his leadership, Great Britain won two gold medals in the skeleton competitions at the 2026 Winter Olympics, their best-ever Winter Olympics total.

== Career results ==
=== Skeleton World Cup ===
Season	Place	Points	1	2	3	4	5	6	7	8	9
2004–05	19th	139	WIN; 37	ALT; 20	IGL —	SIG; 14	CES; 10	STM; 19	LPL; 13		
2005–06	20th	151	CAL; 26	LPL; 10	IGL; 20	SIG; 20	KON; 16	STM; 14	ALT; 19		
2006–07	12th	255	CAL; 18	PKC; 23	LPL; 24	NAG; 15	IGL; 9	CES —	WIN; 3	KON; 5	
2007–08	5th	1369	CAL; 7	PKC; 11	LPL; 4	CES1; 7	CES2; 7	STM; 6	KON; 11	WIN; 1	
2008–09	6th	1282	WIN; 3	ALT; 2	IGL; 3	KON; 4	STM; 17	WIN; 12	PKC; 11	LKP; 11	
2009–10	1st	1694	PKC; 1	LKP; 3	CES; 2	WIN; 1	ALT; 5	KON; 1	STM; 3	IGL; 1	
2010–11	1st	1719	WHI; 5	CAL; 1	PKC; 3	LKP; 2	IGL; 1	WIN; 1	STM; 1	CES; 1	
2011–12	1st	1751	IGL; 1	LPL; 1	WIN; 1	ALT; 1	KON; 6	STM; 1	WHI; 1	CAL; 1	
2012–13	1st	2010	LKP; 1	PKC; 1	WHI; 2	WIN; 1	LPL; 1	ALT; 1	KON; 1	IGL; 1	SOC; 1
2013–14	1st	1720	CAL; 1	PKC; 2	LKP; 8	WIN; 1	STM1; 1	STM2; 1	IGL; 1	KON; 1	
2014–15	1st	1770	LKP; 1	CAL; 1	ALT; 1	KON; 2	STM; 1	LPL; 1	IGL; 1	SOC; 2	
2015–16	1st	1785	ALT; 1	WIN; 1	KON1; 1	LPL; 1	PAC; 1	WHI; 1	STM; 2	KON2; 1	
2016–17	1st	1662	WHI; 4	LPL; 5	ALT; 2	WIN; 1	STM; 1	KON; 6	IGL; 1	PYE; 1	
2017–18	4th	1440	LPL; 1	PAC; 2	WHI; 6	WIN; 2	IGL; 1	ALT; 5	STM; DSQ	KON; 2	
2018–19	3rd	1533	SIG; 2	WIN; 7	ALT; 7	IGL; 1	STM; 8	LPL; 2	CAL1; 3	CAL2; 4	
2019–20	1st	1665	LKP1; 2	LKP1; 2	WIN; 4	PAC; 2	IGL; 1	KON; 7	STM; 1	SIG; 1	
2020–21	1st	1456	SIG1; 1	SIG2; 1	IGL1; 1	IGL2; 1	WIN; 2	STM; 2	KON; 11	IGL3 —	
2021–22	1st	1623	IGL1; 2	IGL2; 11	ALT1; 3	WIN1; 4	ALT2; 1	SIG; 3	WIN2; 1	STM; 1	

Olympic Games
Preceded by Artūrs Irbe	Flagbearer for Latvia; Vancouver 2010	Succeeded by Sandis Ozoliņš
