= Shelley Rudman =

British former skeleton bobsleigh athlete

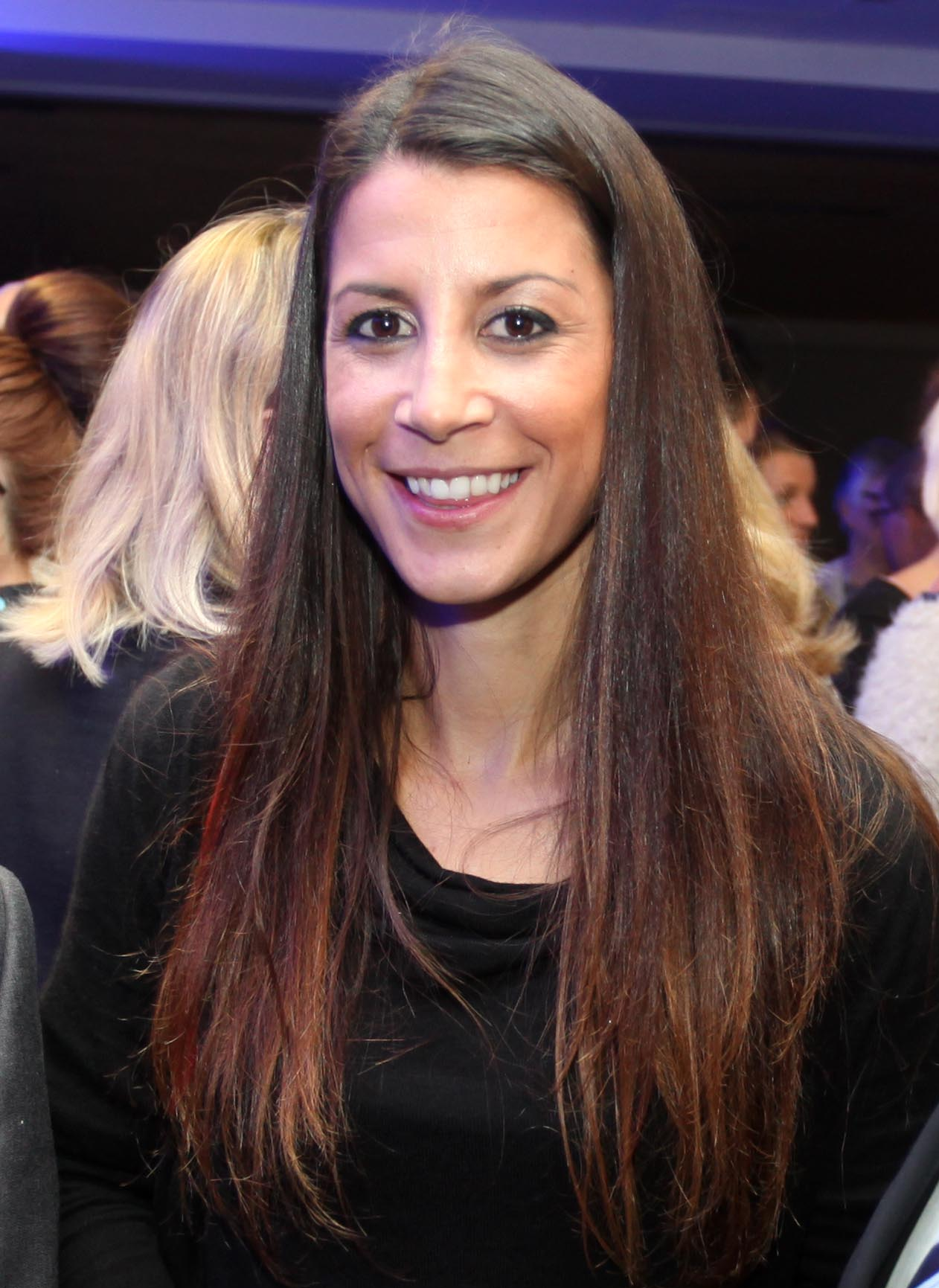
- Rudman in 2015

Personal information
- National team: Great Britain
- Born: 23 March 1981 (age 45) Swindon, England
- Home town: Pewsey, Wiltshire
- Education: BSc Sports Science - St Mary’s, Twickenham. Coach Education & Sports Performance - University of Bath
- Occupation(s): International Sports Consultancy. Owner of Shelley Rudman (SR) Gym & Personal Training.
- Height: 168 cm (5 ft 6 in)
- Weight: 56 kg (123 lb)
- Children: 2

Sport
- Country: Great Britain
- Sport: Skeleton
- University team: University of Bath St Marys College, Twickenham

Achievements and titles
- Olympic finals: Torino 2006 (Olympic silver), Vancouver 2010, Sochi 2014
- World finals: St Moritz 2013 (Gold) Overall World Cup 2012 (Gold) World Student Games 2005 (Gold)
Medal record
Olympic Games
| Silver medal – second place | 2006 Turin | Women |
World Championships
| Gold medal – first place | 2013 St. Moritz | Women |
Skeleton World Cup
| Gold medal – first place | 2011–2012 | Women |
| Silver medal – second place | 2008–09 | Women |
| Silver medal – second place | 2009–10 | Women |
| Silver medal – second place | 2010–11 | Women |
| Bronze medal – third place | 2012-13 | Women |
European Bob and Skeleton Championships
| Gold medal – first place | 2009 St. Moritz | Women |
| Gold medal – first place | 2011 St. Moritz | Women |
| Silver medal – second place | 2006 Igls | Women |
| Silver medal – second place | 2014 Germany | Women |
| Bronze medal – third place | 2010 Winterberg | Women |
| Bronze medal – third place | 2012 Germany | Women |
Winter Universiade
| Gold medal – first place | 2005 Innsbruck | Women's Skeleton |
British Skeleton ranking
| Gold medal – first place | 2004 -2012 | Women's Skeleton |

Shelley Rudman (born 23 March 1981) is a skeleton athlete who in 2013 became the first British woman to win the world skeleton championship. She also won a silver medal at the 2006 Winter Olympics, and is a former World Cup and two-time European champion.

== Early life and education ==
Rudman was born in Swindon, and later lived in Pewsey, Wiltshire, where she attended Pewsey Vale School. She later attended New College, Swindon.

She took up skeleton in October 2002, after being introduced to the sport at the University of Bath push track. At the time, she was working full-time at the ACS International Schools, Cobham, Surrey and was in her third year of a Bachelor of Science degree course at St Mary's College, Twickenham.

== Career ==
=== Early career ===
The following season in 2003, she qualified for the World Junior Championships and finished in tenth position. In 2004, she won the Europa Cup in Igls, Austria. In 2005, she won gold in the World University Games, held in Innsbruck, Austria.

=== 2006 Winter Olympics ===
In order to take part in the 2006 Olympics, Rudman needed £4,000 to buy a new sled. Her home town held a sponsored canoe event (canoeing from Pewsey to Bath, where she was training) to help raise the money. Rudman also spent some time working as a supply teacher at Devizes School, a secondary school in Devizes, Wiltshire.

By the time the 2006 Winter Olympics began in Turin, Rudman said she was aiming for a top-ten position. In the first heat, she was fourth; after the second heat, she finished with a silver medal. On her return to Pewsey, the village gave her an open-top bus parade to recognize her achievement.

=== Skeleton World Cup performances: 2007–2009 ===
Rudman finished tenth in the women's skeleton at St. Moritz in the 2007 World Championships. She later announced that she was to become a mother in October and would consequently miss much of the following season.

She sat out the 2007–08 Skeleton World Cup season to give birth to her daughter, and returned to the Inter-continental circuit in North America in January, where she finished second in Park City and won the penultimate race in Lake Placid. Rudman won the 2008–09 Skeleton World Cup event at Igls, Austria on 12 December 2008. She then earned the second medal of her 2008/09 World Cup campaign with a silver at Königssee in Germany, in January 2009.

She won the 2009 European Championships at St Moritz, breaking the track record with a time of 1:09.97 on her second run.

=== 2009–2010: World Cup & Olympics ===
Rudman repeated the feat of finishing the season in second place overall in the World Cup, behind champion Mellissa Hollingsworth. During the season, she took gold medal wins in Cesana and St. Moritz, a second place in Lake Placid and a third place at Konigssee. The last race of the season in Igls also counted as the 2010 European Championships, and Rudman finished with the bronze medal.

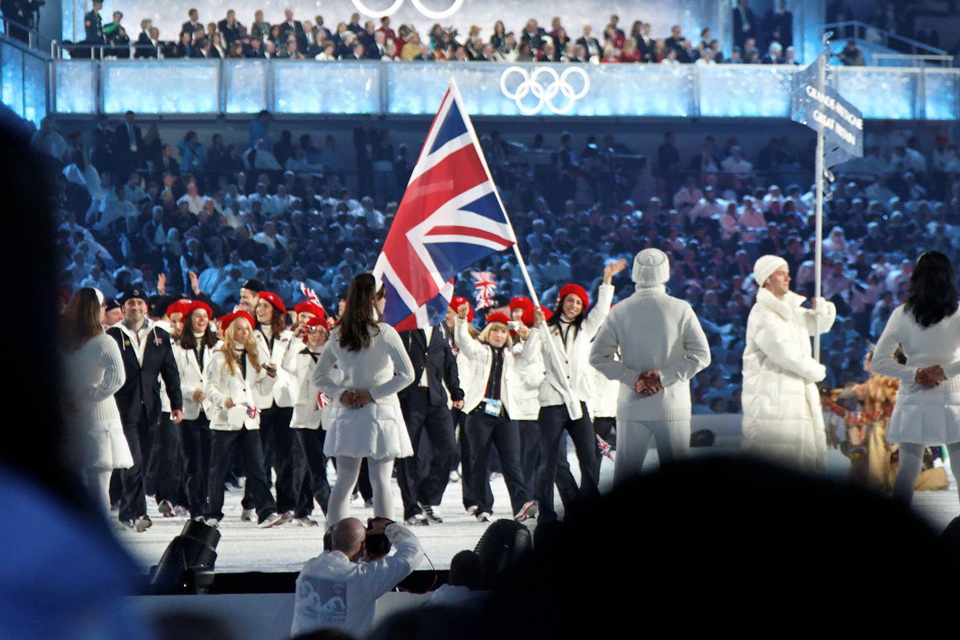
Rudman carrying the British flag at the opening ceremony of the 2010 Winter Olympics

In January 2010, Rudman was announced as part of the Team GB squad to compete at the 2010 Winter Olympics in Vancouver, Canada. She was the flagbearer for Great Britain at the opening ceremony.

An hour's delay to the race start affected the settings Rudman had chosen for the first run, which resulted in her finishing low in the overall standings after day one. The following day, after changing her settings, she set the fastest time of the day, breaking her push start personal best, but the time deficit from the previous day was too much to catch up and she finished sixth overall; missing out on claiming a second Olympic medal. The gold was won by fellow British competitor Amy Williams.

=== Later career ===
Rudman became European champion in January 2011 after finishing 0.22 seconds ahead of second-placed Anja Huber in Winterberg. The event also doubled up as a World Cup event, her fifth career win in the competition. After finishing runner-up in the Skeleton World Cup in the previous three years, Rudman secured the World Cup title at the end of the 2011–12 season. Earlier in the competition, she finished third in Altenberg and won gold in Königssee. Shen then finished second in St Moritz (behind her teammate Lizzy Yarnold), and third in Whistler. Another third-place finish in the last race of the season in Calgary earned her a fifth podium finish of the season and moved her to the top of the final rankings ahead of German duo Marion Thees (2nd) and Anja Huber (3rd).

In December 2012, Rudman won the 2012-13 World Cup event in Winterberg. The following February, she became the first British woman to win the world skeleton championship, after finishing 0.57 seconds ahead of runner-up Noelle Pikus-Pace in St Moritz.

At the 2014 Winter Olympics, Rudman finished in 16th position. In September 2014, she announced that she would miss the forthcoming skeleton season as she was expecting her second child. A year later, she announced that she would also miss the 2015-16 World Cup season as she was extending her maternity leave.

== Personal life ==
Rudman is married to fellow British skeleton competitor Kristan Bromley, with whom she has two daughters, born in October 2007, and January 2015.

In February 2016, Rudman was nominated to be an International Olympic Committee Athlete Role Model for the Winter Youth Olympics in Lillehammer, Norway. In 2017, she set up a fitness gym business in her home county of Wiltshire. Rudman is a trustee and ambassador of Wiltshire and Bath Air Ambulance Charity.

== See also ==
- Skeleton at the 2006 Winter Olympics

Olympic Games
| Preceded by Rhona Martin | Flagbearer for Great Britain; Vancouver 2010 | Succeeded by Jon Eley |
