= Chris Type =

British skeleton racer (born 1981)

Christopher John Type (born 5 October 1981 in Merthyr Tydfil) is a British skeleton racer who has competed since 2004. He was the winner of the FIBT Men’s Inter-Continental Cup series in 2009–10 after finishing 2nd in 2008–09. Type made his debut at World Cup level in the first race of the 2010–11 season. At the 2010 Winter Olympics in Vancouver, Type accompanied the British team as a reserve (Adam Pengilly and Kristan Bromley were chosen ahead of Type to occupy the two British spots).

Type retired in 2011 and immediately joined the British skeleton team as a coach.

== World Championship record ==
- 2011 14th

== World ranking progression ==
- 2007–08 28th
- 2008–09 16th
- 2009–10 12th
- 2010–11 11th
