= Nozomi Komuro =

Japanese skeleton racer (born 1985)

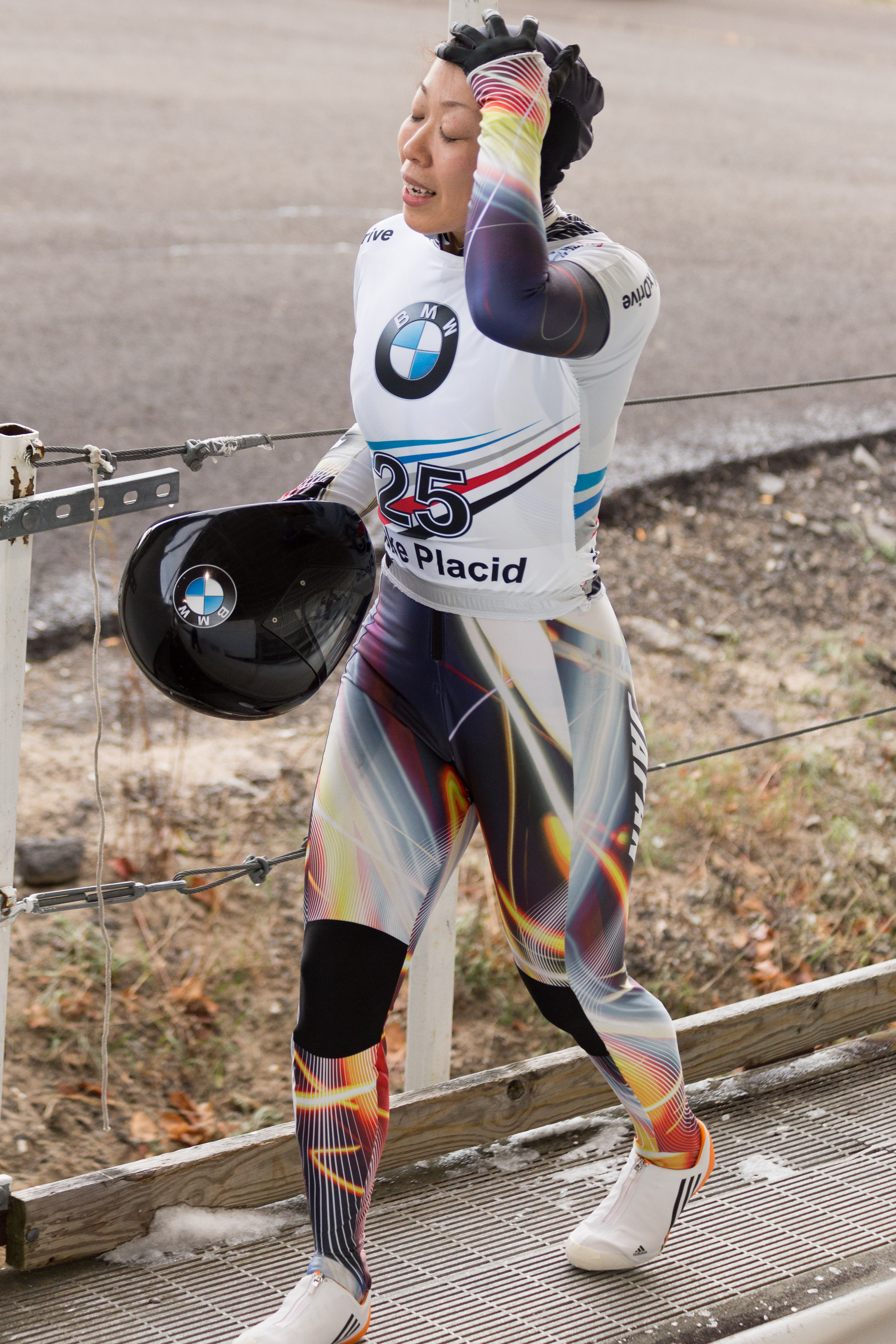
- Komuro at the 2017 World Cup in Lake Placid

Personal information
- Native name: 小室 希
- Nationality: Japanese
- Born: May 29, 1985 (age 40)
- Height: 161 cm (5 ft 3 in)
- Weight: 63 kg (139 lb)

Sport
- Country: Japan
- Sport: Skeleton
- Coached by: Kyle Tress

Nozomi Komuro (小室 希, Komuro Nozomi; born May 29, 1985) is a Japanese skeleton racer who has competed since 2004 and joined the Japanese national team in 2005. She uses a Bromley sled.

== Notable results ==
Komuro joined the North American Cup circuit in 2006–07, finishing 20th in her only start, at Calgary, joining the World Cup for the remainder of the season, when her best finish was 9th at her home track in Nagano. She remained on the World Cup until the 2008 Junior World Championships in Igls, where she finished in 6th place. Since then, she has primarily competed at the Intercontinental and World Cup levels, with only one return to the North American tour, in 2015; she has never competed on the Europe Cup. Komuro's best World Cup finish was fourth in the women's World Cup in Lake Placid, New York, on December 17, 2010. She competed in the 2014 Winter Olympics in Sochi, Russia, and finished in 19th place; her best finish at the World Championships was 12th, in 2009. Her best overall result in the World Cup rankings was 10th, in the 2010–11 season. In the 2016–17 season, she finished with an overall ranking of 22nd.

She qualified for the 2010 Winter Olympics but was disqualified before the first run of the competition began because her sled was not certified as being compliant with FIBT regulations.
