= Utah Olympic Park Track =

Winter Sports Track near Park City, Utah

Coordinates: 40°42′28″N 111°33′50″W

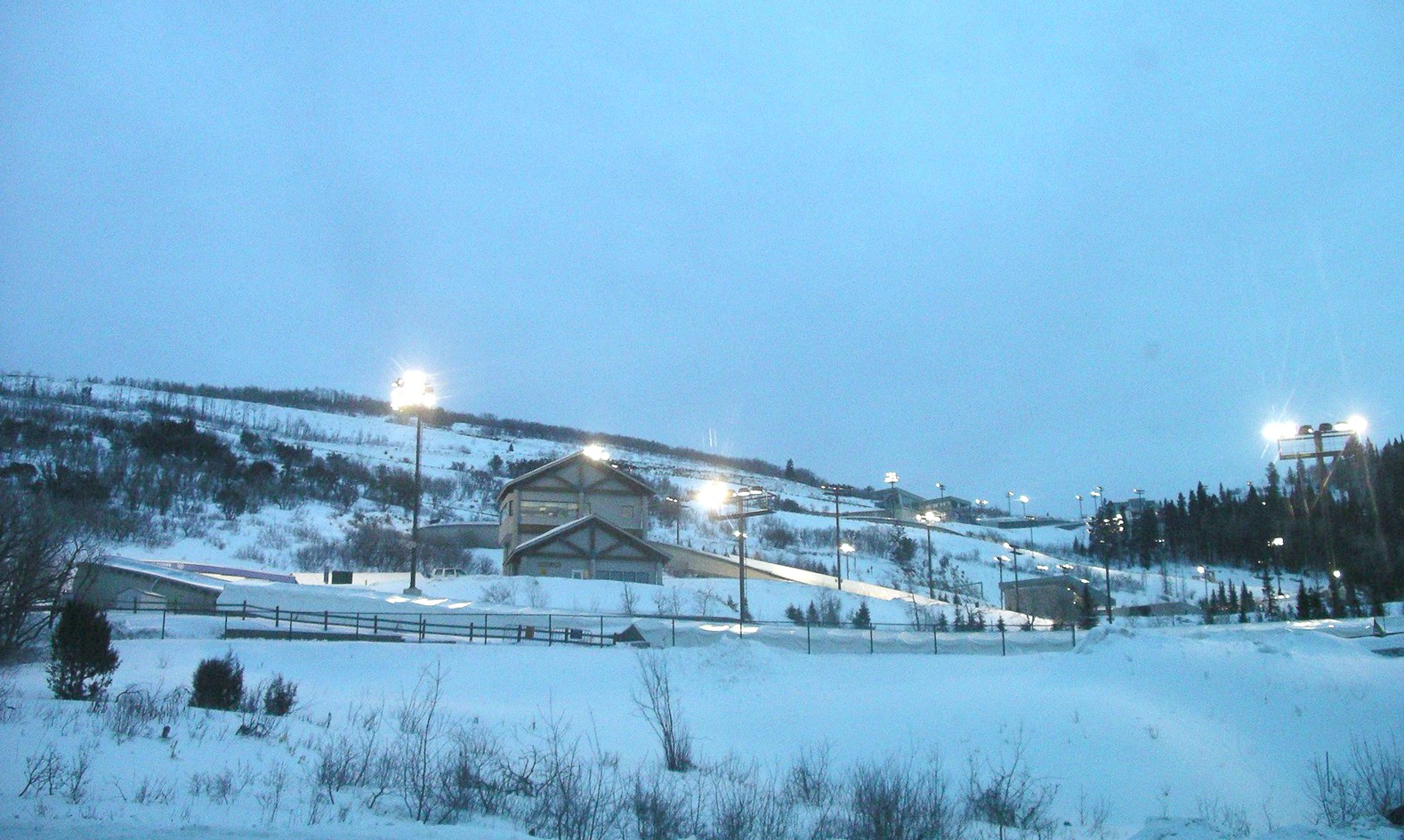
- Looking up at the track in the Utah Olympic Park

- Location within the United States Location within Utah
- Location: Park City, Utah, U.S.
- Operator: Utah Olympic Legacy Foundation
- Capacity: 15,000
- Surface: Artificial-Refrigerated Concrete
- Record attendance: 15,520

Construction
- Groundbreaking: June 3, 1994
- Built: December 28, 1994
- Opened: January 25, 1997
- Cost: $20 million
- Architects: Josef Lenz, IBG & Partner

Website
- Utah Olympic Park

The Utah Olympic Park Track is a bobsleigh, luge, and skeleton track in the United States, located in the Utah Olympic Park near Park City, Utah. During the 2002 Winter Olympics in nearby Salt Lake City, the track hosted the bobsleigh, luge, and skeleton events, and is expected to reprise these roles for the 2034 Winter Olympics. Today the track still serves as a training center for Olympic and development level athletes and hosts numerous local and international competitions. It is one of two national tracks; the other is at Mt. Van Hoevenberg near Lake Placid, New York.

== History ==
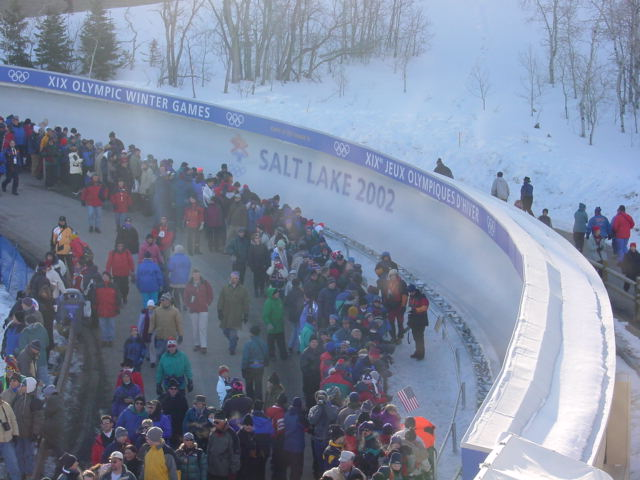
The track as seen during the 2002 Winter Olympics

In 1989, Utah's voters passed the Olympic referendum, allowing taxpayer money to be used to construct a winter sports park, which would include the track. The park would be used if Salt Lake City won its bid for either the 1998 or 2002 Winter Olympics and following the games, Olympic funds and revenue would then be used to repay the state. In 1990, the Utah Sports Authority announced their plans to build the park, which included ski jumps and a bobsled/luge track, in Bear Hollow near Park City.

The following year, on June 15, 1991, Salt Lake City lost its 1998 Winter Olympics bid by four votes to Nagano, Japan. Still, construction on the park commenced following a groundbreaking ceremony on May 29, 1991. The original estimated cost of the park was $26.3 million and included the ski jumps, bobsled/luge track, and a day lodge; following the completion of the ski jumps they were formally dedicated in a ceremony on January 9, 1993. The track was designed by German luge coach Josef Lenz.

A ceremony on June 3, 1994, signaled the start of construction on the bobsled/luge track. The track was completed December 28, 1996 and its grand opening ceremony was held on January 25, 1997. The very first run on the new track was by luger Jon Owen on January 10, 1997. Following the completion of the track it was decided to reintroduce skeleton as an Olympic event during the 2002 Winter Olympics and plans called to use the track to host all three sliding three events.

While construction was progressing on the track, Salt Lake City had won its 1995 bid to host the 2002 Winter Olympics, and plans were developed to expand the park. On October 9, 1997, the Salt Lake Organizing Committee (SLOC) authorized the plan to spend an additional $48 million to upgrade and expand the recently completed park. The plans called for the construction of starting houses on the track, chairlifts, storage buildings, and new access roads. Ownership of the Park was transferred to SLOC from the Utah Sports Authority on July 14, 1999, and soon after the park's name was changed from the Utah Winter Sports Park to the Utah Olympic Park.

During the 2002 games, the track hosted 74,187 bobsleigh spectators, 14,860 skeleton spectators, and 64,104 luge spectators.

The track will once again serve as a venue during the 2034 Winter Olympics, hosting the same events as it did in 2002.

== Track technical details ==
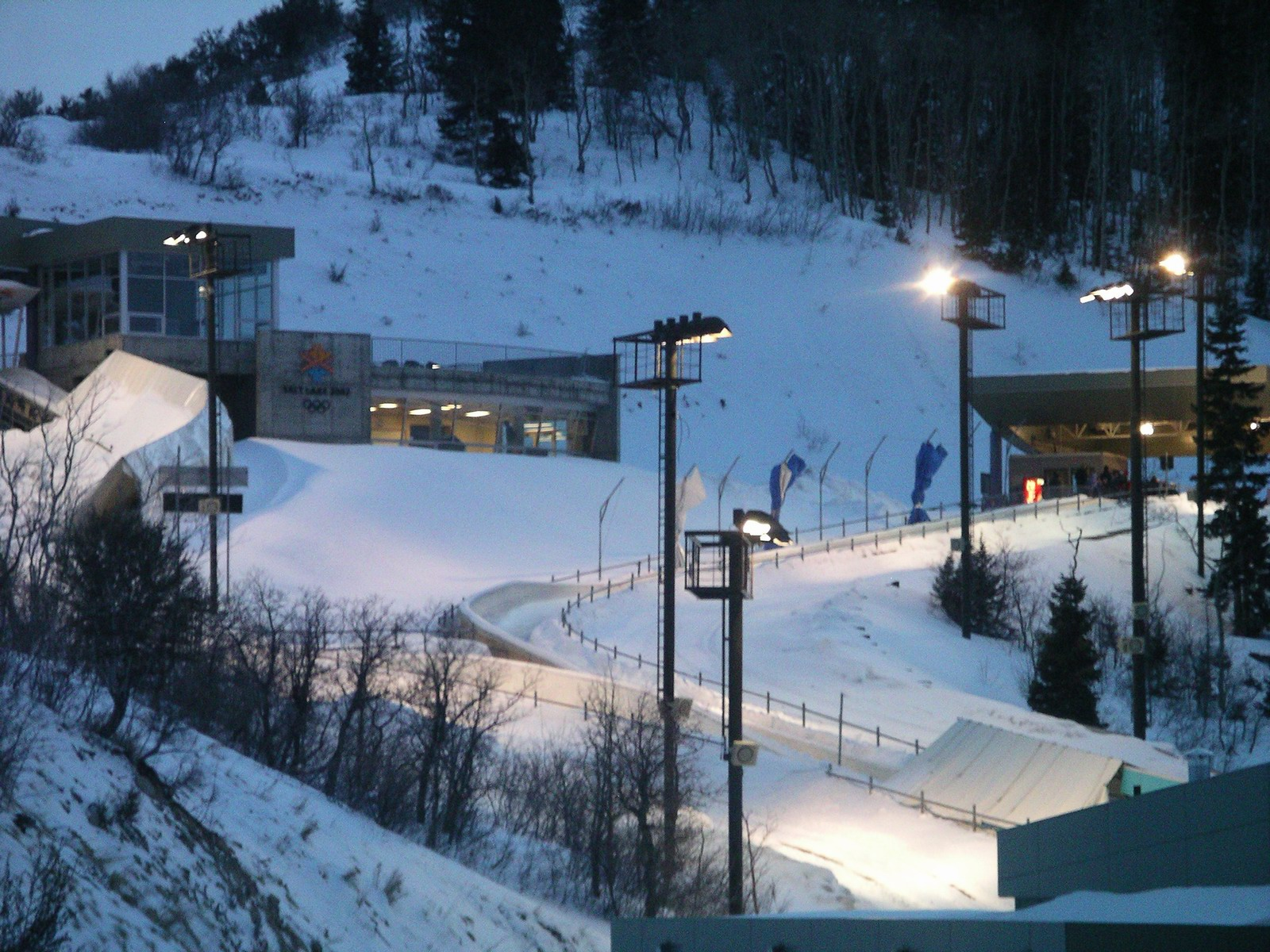
Looking at bobsled/skeleton start and men's luge start

Costing about $25 million to construct, the track uses 297,000 watts of track lighting, 62 water hydrants (for ice- and snowmaking), 24 cameras, eight scoreboards, and 49 timing points. Generally open from October to the end of March annually, the track takes a total of 18 days to ice down to the required thickness needed to run sliding events. The track has 54 miles (87 km) of piping with 110,000 pounds (50,000 kg) of ammonia refrigeration able to keep the track to −14 °F (−26 °C). During the operating season, a nine-man crew smooths the track daily. A total of 59 temperature probes are located throughout the track to ensure the ice temperature is properly monitored. Throughout the track, a $1 million retractable shading system protects the course from sun and snow, which reduces energy usage by 25 percent and the need to clear the track from snow.

== Statistics ==
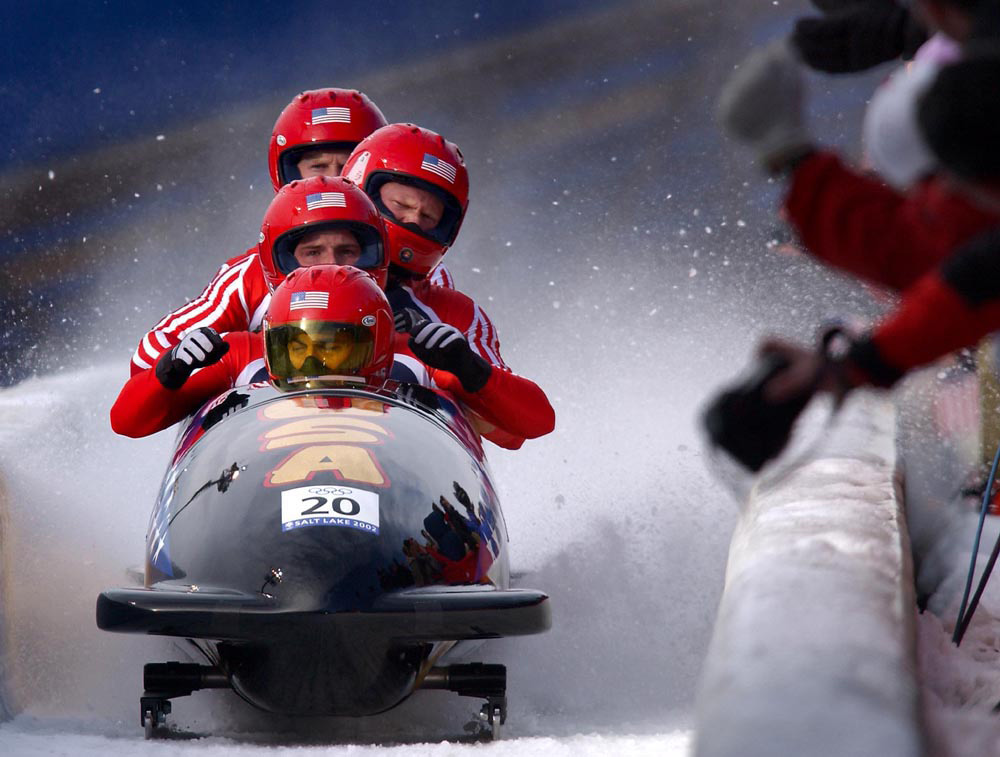
Team USA comes to a stop, finishing their third run during the 2002 Winter Olympics

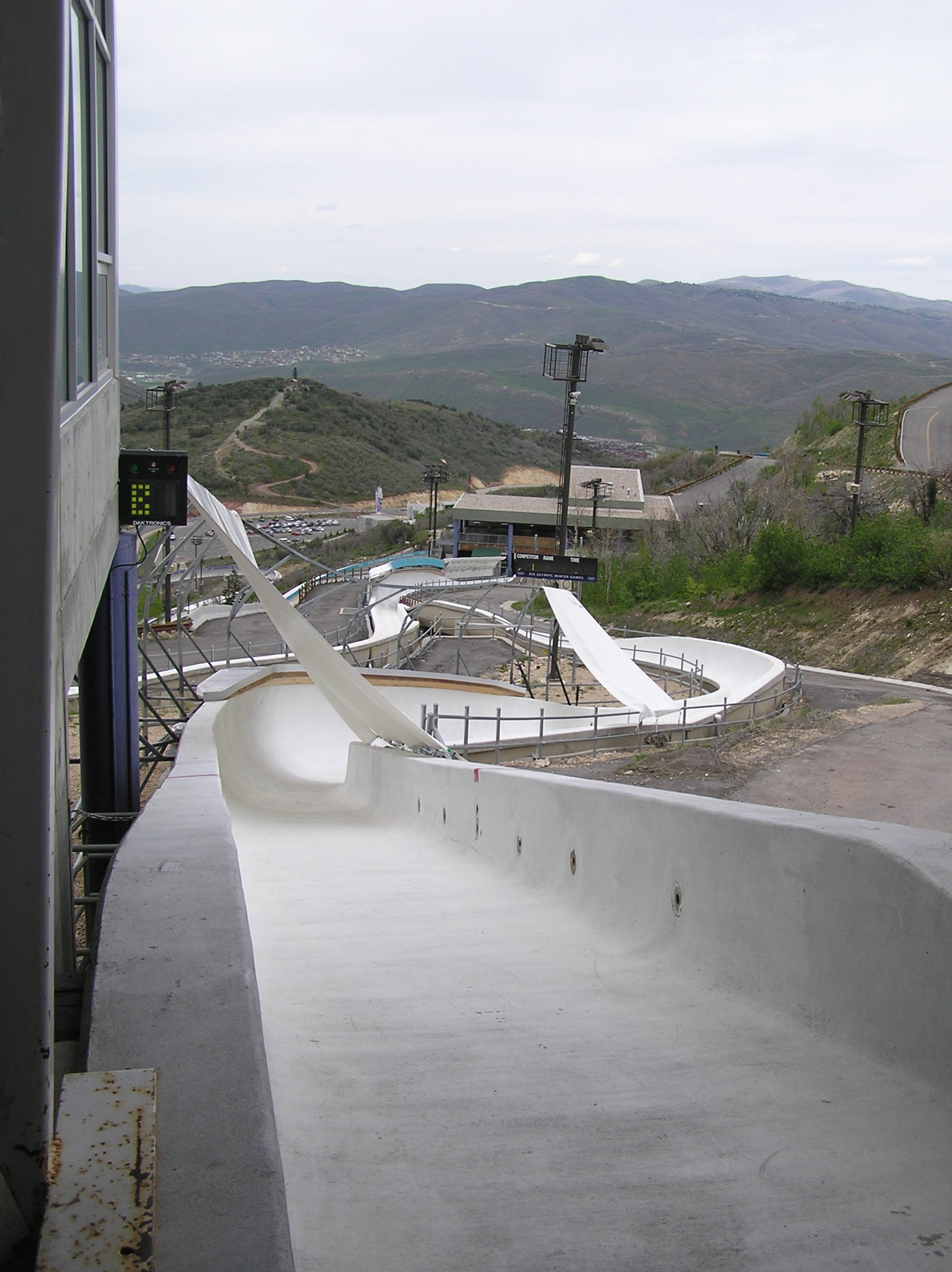
The track as seen from the start of the men's single luge run

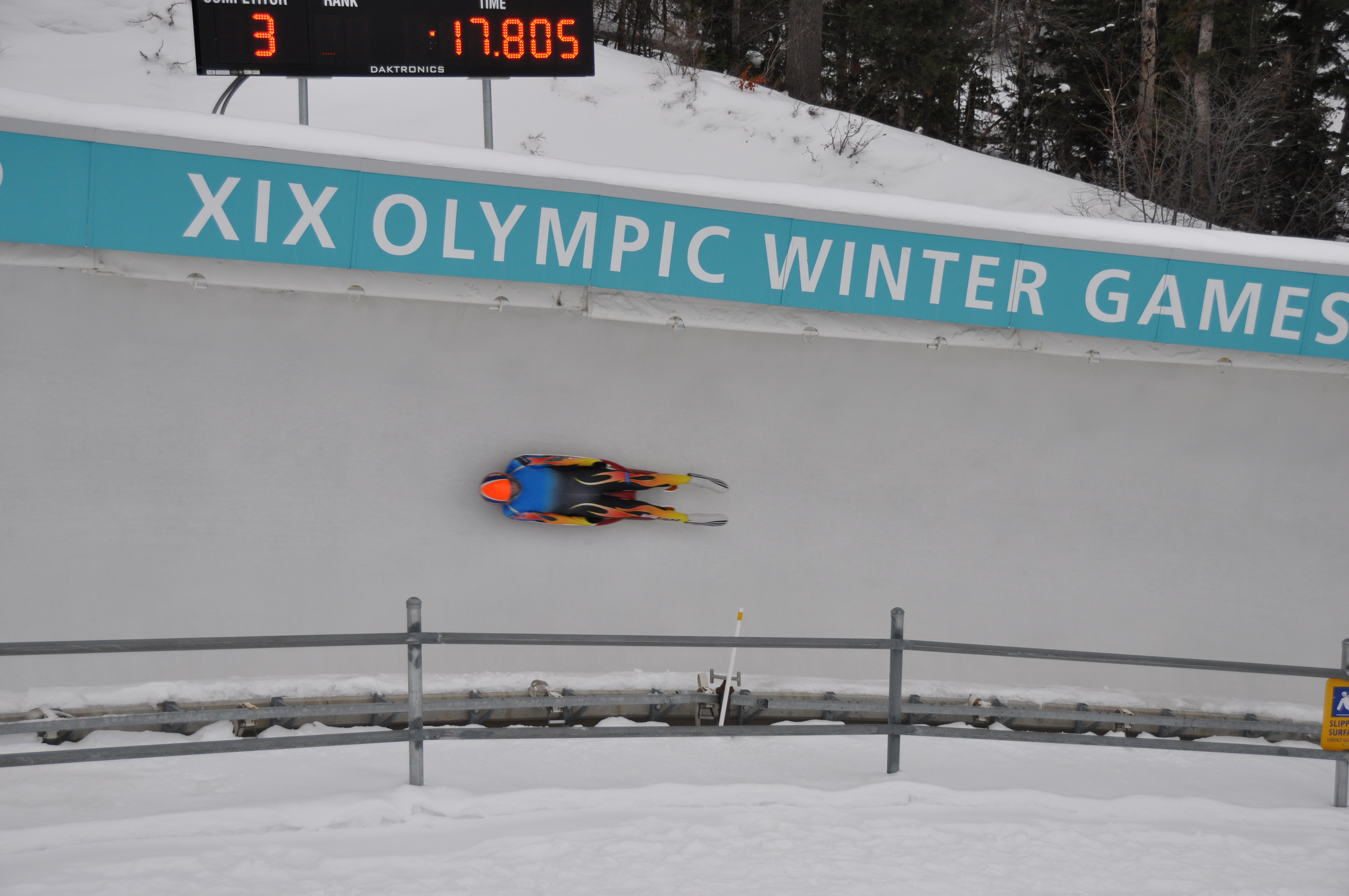
USA Luge Junior National Team Athlete Matt Wolbach, slides through curve six during the "2010 Utah Winter Games"

Physical statistics
Sport	Length	Turns	Vertical drop	Average grade (%)
Bobsleigh and skeleton	1.335 km (0.83 mi)	15	103.5 m (340 ft)	7.80
Luge – men's singles	1.316 km (0.82 mi)	17	106 m (348 ft)	8.10
Luge – women's singles/ men's doubles	1.140 km (0.71 mi)	12	77 m (253 ft)	6.80

- The elevation at the base is 6,982 feet (2,128 m) above sea level.

Turns
Turn number	Name	Reason named
4.	Sunny corner	Sunniest part of the track.
5.	Snowy corner	Snowiest part of the track.
6., 7., 8., 9., 10.	Albert's alley	
11.	Wasatch	After the Wasatch Range in Utah.
12.	Olympic	After the Winter Olympics.
14.	Finish Curve	After the curve before the finish straight and the actual finish curve of Turn 15.

The turn names were given by John Morgan during Speed Channel's World Cup bobsleigh coverage on December 17 & 23, 2006. All curves shown are bobsleigh. Men's singles' luge joins after turn two while women's singles and men's doubles luge joins after turn three. Turns 1, 2, 3, 13, and 15 do not have turn names. The section between curves 14 and 15 is the fastest, leading into a long finish straight that was referred to by Morgan as the "Graveyard" section because you could lose both time and speed if you hit the walls leading to that turn.

Track records
Sport	Record	Nation	Athlete(s)	Date	Time (seconds)
Bobsleigh – two-man	Start	Canada	Justin Kripps & Jesse Lumsden	November 9, 2011	4.77
Bobsleigh – two-woman	Start	Canada	Kaillie Humphries & Heather Moyse	November 14, 2009	5.22
Luge – men's singles	Track	Austria	Markus Prock	February 11, 2002	44.271
Luge – women's singles	Track	Germany	Sylke Otto	February 13, 2002	42.940
Luge – men's doubles	Track	Germany	Patric Leitner & Alexander Resch	February 15, 2002	42.953

Up until 2009, the track was considered the "World's Fastest Ice" and was where American luger Tony Benshoof set the highest recorded luge speed of 86.6 miles per hour (139.4 km/h) on October 16, 2001, which made the Guinness Book of World Records. Benshoof's speed record was eclipsed at the 2008-09 Luge World Cup season finale at the Whistler Sliding Centre in British Columbia, Canada, when Felix Loch of Germany reached a top speed of 153.98 km/h (95.68 mph) on February 21, 2009.

== Championships hosted ==
- Winter Olympics: 2002, 2034
- FIL World Luge Championships: 2005
- Skeleton World Cup: 2006, 2007, 2008, 2009, 2010, 2011, 2013, 2014, 2016
- Luge World Cup: 2001, 2003, 2004, 2007, 2011, 2014, 2016
