= Donna Creighton =

British bobsledder and skeleton racer

Donna Creighton (born 20 September 1985 in Portsmouth, England)) is a British former bobsledder and skeleton racer who has competed since 2004. Before taking up sliding she was a heptathlete.

== Career ==
Her best World Cup finish was fourth three times in the women's event, at Whistler Sliding Centre and Cesana Pariol in the 2010-11 season and at Lake Placid in the 2012-13 season. Creighton announced her retirement from skeleton in April 2017, having competed in six FIBT World Championships. However, in July of that year she announced that following her retirement she had taken up bobsleigh driving and would compete in the upcoming season with the aim of qualifying for the 2018 Winter Olympics in Pyeongchang, South Korea. She later retired from bobsleigh after failing to attain funding to compete at the 2018 Winter Olympics.
