= Giovanni Mulassano =

Italian skeleton racer

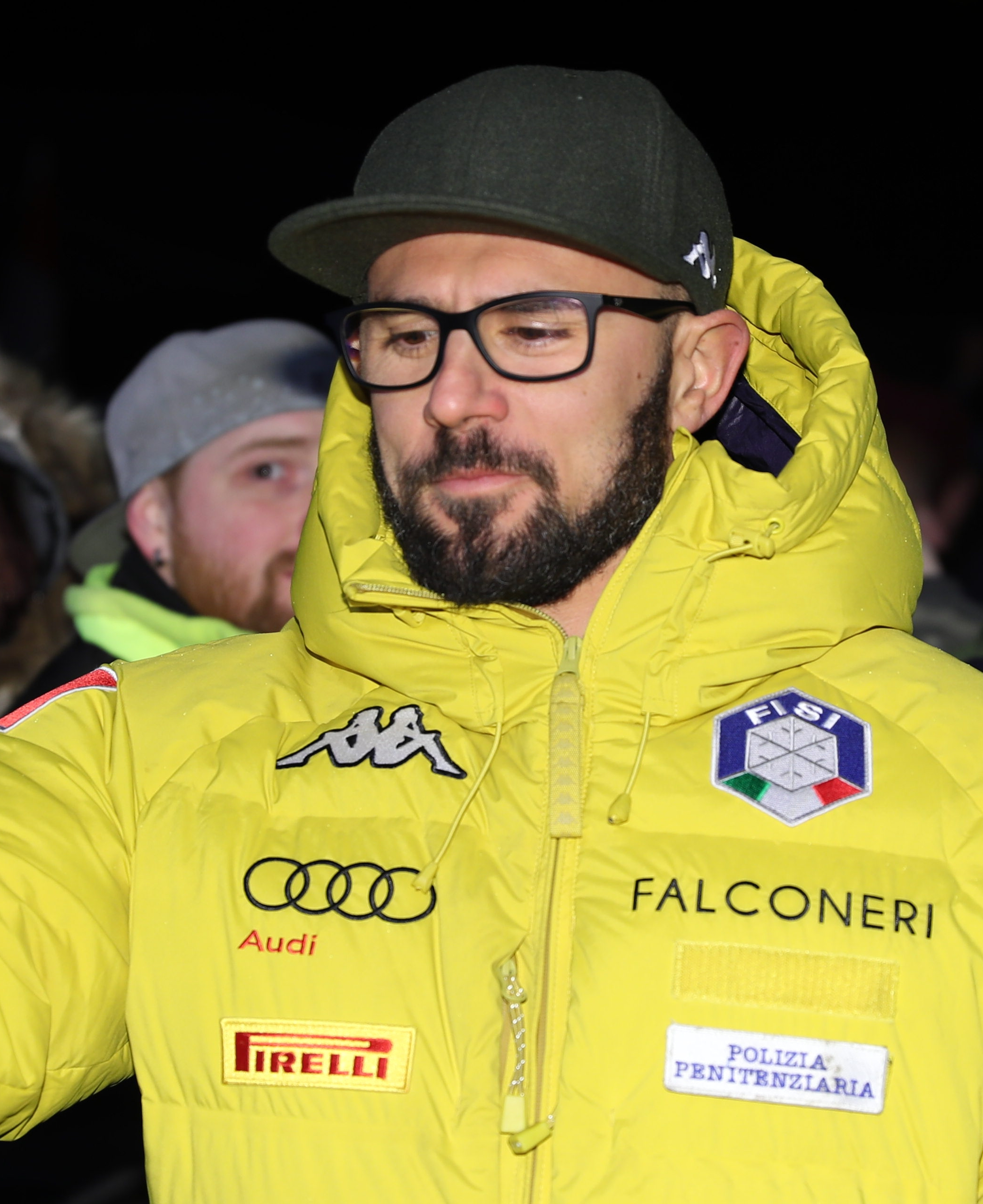
- Mulassano in 2020

Personal information
- Nationality: Italian
- Born: 7 July 1985 (age 39); Cuneo, Italy
- Height: 1.83 m (6 ft 0 in)
- Weight: 90 kg (198 lb)

Sport
- Sport: Skeleton; Bobsleigh
- Club: Fiamme Azzurre
- Retired: 2019

Giovanni Mulassano (born 7 July 1985) is an Italian coach a former skeleton racer and bobbsleder who competed at the IBSF World Championships, in 2011 and 2013 at individual senior level in skeleton and in 2016 in four-man bobsleigh.
