= Alexander Kröckel =

German skeleton racer (born 1990)

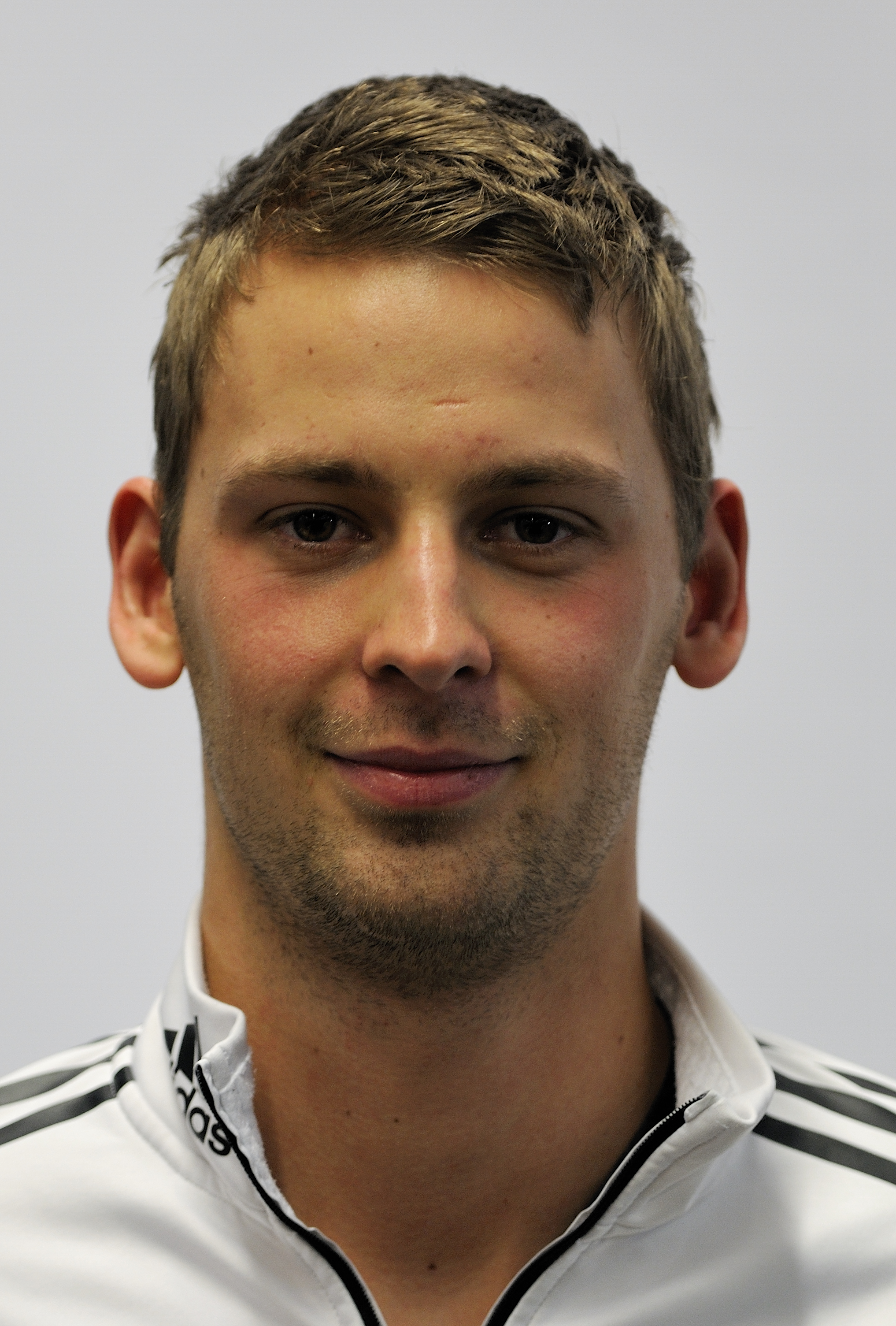

Personal information
- Nationality: German
- Born: 12 March 1990 (age 35); Suhl, East Germany
- Height: 1.86 m (6 ft 1 in)
- Weight: 72 kg (159 lb)

Sport
- Country: Germany
- Sport: Skeleton

Alexander Kröckel (also spelled Kroeckel; born 12 March 1990) is a German skeleton racer who has competed since 2003. 2007 he joined the German national squad. He won Junior World Championships in 2011 and was second in 2010. 2011–12 Skeleton World Cup he finished 5th.
