= Olga Potylitsina =

Russian skeleton racer

Olga Viktorovna Potylitsyna (Russian: Ольга Викторовна Потылицына; born 17 September 1989 in Krasnoyarsk) is a Russian skeleton racer who has competed since 2007. Her best Skeleton World Cup finish was first at Igls in November 2011, which was 1st stage of 2011–12 World Cup season. At 2010–11 World Cup season she was 9th at the standings. She competed at the 2014 Winter Olympics in Sochi but was disqualified on 22 November 2017.
