= La Plagne bobsleigh, luge, and skeleton track =

Sports facility in France

Coordinates: 45°31′18″N 6°40′40″E

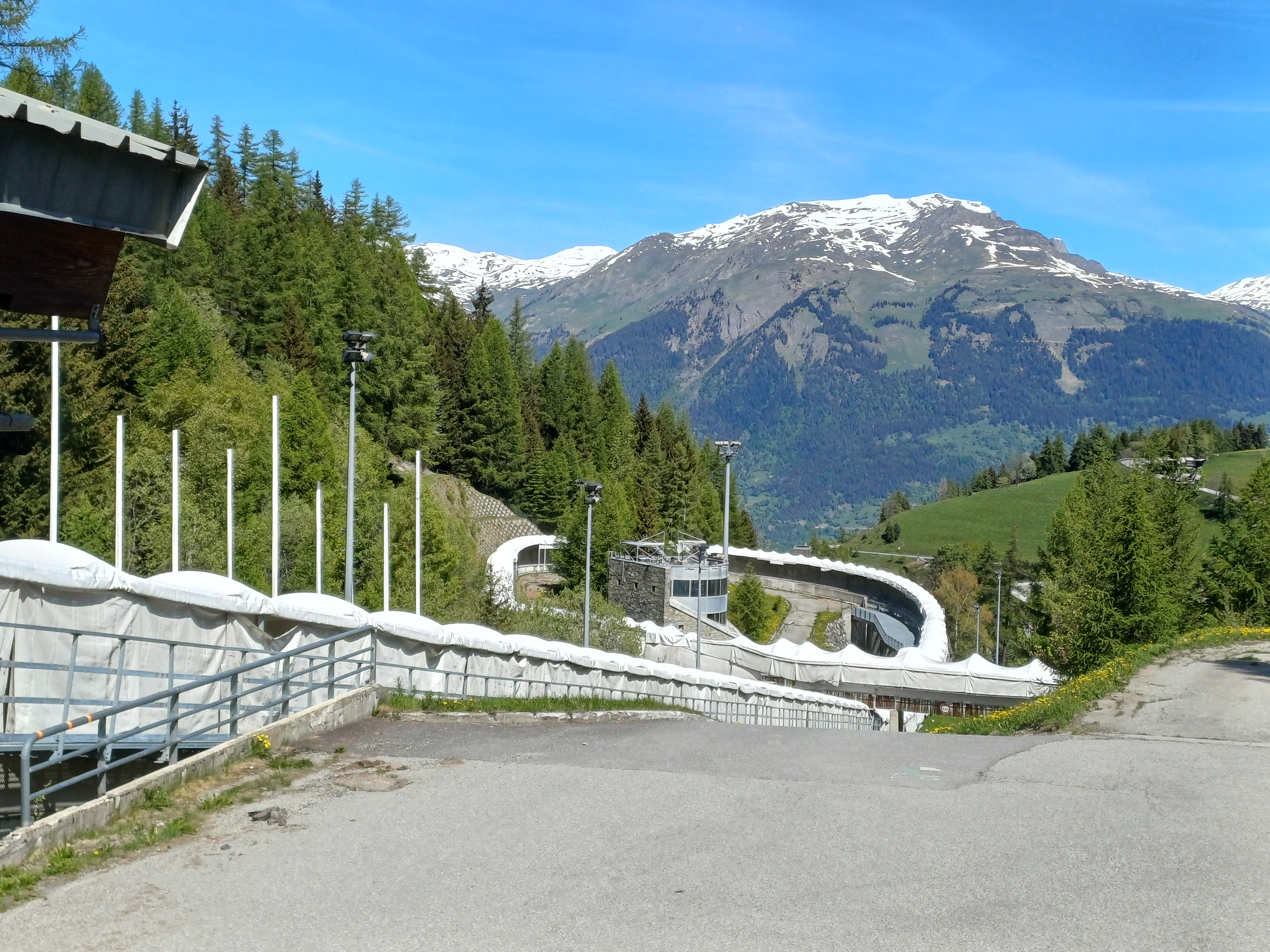
View of the track

The La Plagne bobsleigh, luge, and skeleton track is a bobsleigh, luge, and skeleton track located in Macot-la-Plagne (nowadays it is a part of La Plagne Tarentaise) , Savoie, France. The track was the venue for the bobsleigh and luge competitions for the 1992 Winter Olympics in Albertville. It will host those events again and skeleton at the 2030 Winter Olympics in the French Alps.

== History ==
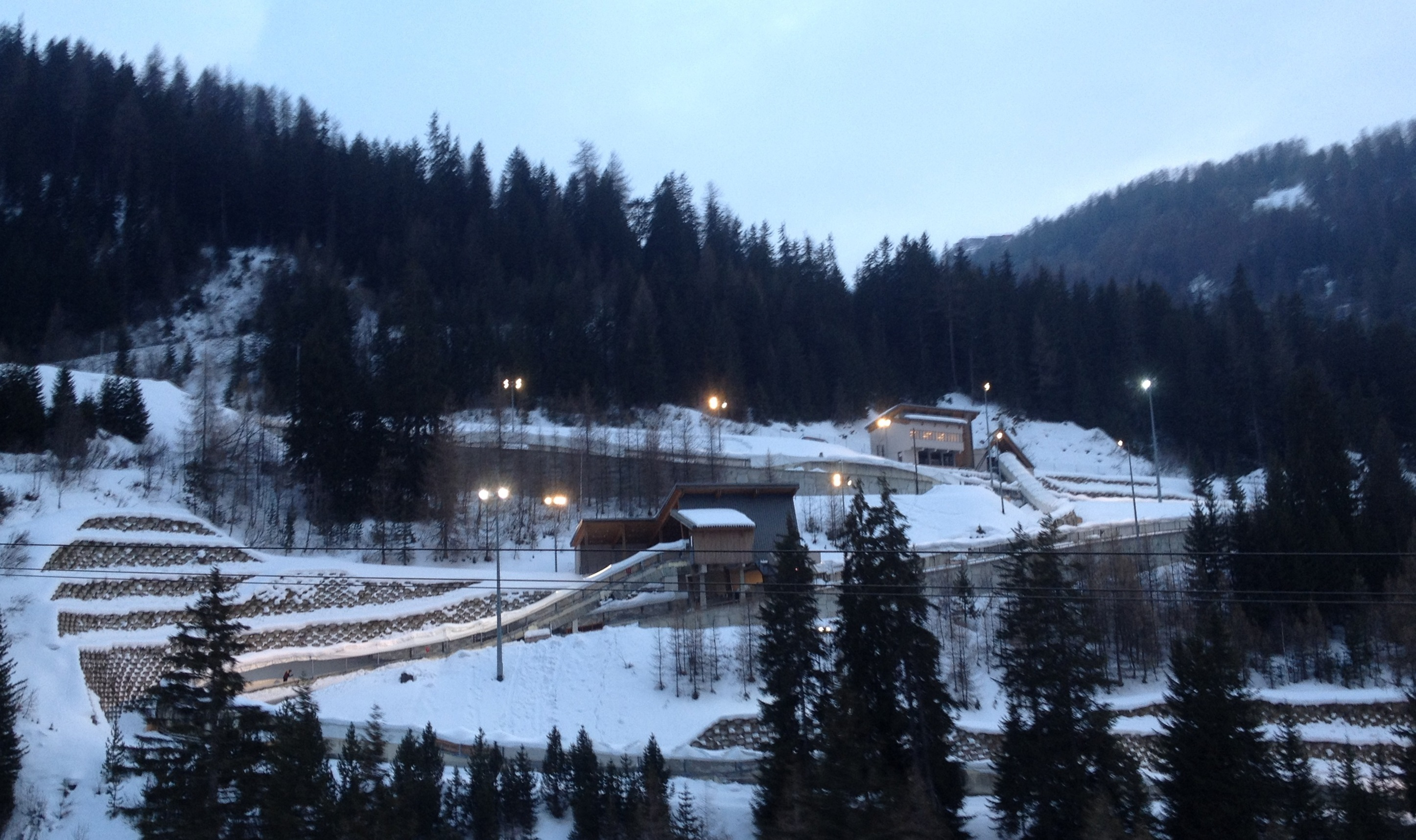
View of the track's upper section

In 1986, Albertville was awarded the 1992 Winter Olympics over Sofia, Bulgaria; Falun, Sweden; Lillehammer, Norway; Cortina d'Ampezzo, Italy; Anchorage, Alaska, United States; and Berchtesgaden, West Germany. The track was constructed from September 1988 to December 1990 designed for use in bobsleigh and luge competitions with the drivers in mind. Ice team staff was recruited in August 1990 while the first ice test was performed in January 1991. The first bobsleigh test event was in February 1991 while the first luge test event was in March 1991. The track hosted the skeleton event of the FIBT World Championships in 1993. Since the 1992 Winter Olympics, the track has been host to programs on bobsleigh rides performed by 1998 Winter Olympic medalist Bruno Mingeon. The track was part of neighboring Annecy's bid package for the 2018 Winter Olympics which was submitted to the International Olympic Committee on 15 October 2009.

== Statistics ==
The track consists of 6,500 cubic metres (8,500 cu yd) of concrete cooled by 80 km (50 mi) of 10 cm (3.9 in) diameter ammonia refrigeration piping that can keep the track cooled to −15 °C (5 °F). When water is applied to ice up the track, a total of 15 ice workers manually apply the water to generate ice up to a thickness of 4 cm (1.6 inch) that is kept at a temperature of -7 to - 10 °C (14 to 19 °F). The outside of the track is covered with insulation and wood. 40 km (25 mi) of electrical conduit connects the track from start to finish, including timing, television cables, computers, and sensors. Technicians from the bobsleigh and luge track in Igls, Austria assisted the ice workers during production and maintenance of the ice for the 1992 Winter Olympics.

== Track lengths and turns ==
Physical statistics
Sport	Length of track		Number of turns	Vertical drop (start to finish)		Average grade (%)
Sport	meters	yards	Number of turns	meters	feet	Average grade (%)
Bobsleigh and skeleton	1,507.5	1,648.6	19	124.5	408	8.29
Luge – men's single	1,249.50	1,366.47	15	110.62	362.9	8.8
Luge – women's singles / men's doubles	1,142.60	1,249.56	14	92.24	302.6	7.5

There are no turn names listed for the track.

== Track records ==
=== Bobsleigh ===
Sport	Record	Nation – athlete(s)	Date	Time (seconds)
4-man	Track	Germany – Christoph Langen / Marko Jacobs / Thomas Platzer / Sven Rühr	19 December 1998	57.31
2-man	Track	Germany – Christoph Langen / Thomas Platzer	18 December 1998	58.68
2-woman	Track	Germany – Laura Nolte / Deborah Levi	11 January 2020	1:00.67
Monobob	Track	United States – Kaysha Love	9 December 2023	1:03.79

=== Skeleton ===
Sport	Record	Nation – athlete(s)	Date	Time (seconds)
Men	Track	Russia – Alexander Tretiakov	10 January 2020	59.28
Women	Track	Russia – Elena Nikitina	10 January 2020	1:01.35

=== Luge ===
Sport	Record	Nation – athlete(s)	Date	Time (seconds)
Men's singles	Track	Austria – Markus Prock	11 December 1995	45.176
Women's singles	Track	Austria – Angelika Neuner	10 December 1995	45.277
Men's doubles	Track	Germany – Patric Leitner / Alexander Resch	9 December 1995	45.022

== Championships hosted ==
- 1992 Winter Olympics
- FIBT World Championships: 1993 (Skeleton)
- 2030 Winter Olympics (Future event)
