= Maurizio Oioli =

Italian skeleton racer

Maurizio Oioli (born 9 July 1981, Domodossola) is an Italian skeleton racer who competed since 2002. At the 2006 Winter Olympics in Turin, he finished 12th in the men's skeleton event.

Oioli also finished 26th in the men's skeleton event at the 2005 FIBT World Championships in Calgary.
