= Lucy Chaffer =

Australian skeleton racer (born 1983)

Personal information
- Born: 19 October 1983 (age 42) Perth, Western Australia
- Occupation(s): Hockey player; teacher
- Employer: Santa Maria College, Perth
- Height: 167 cm (5 ft 6 in) (2014)
- Weight: 58 kg (128 lb) (2014)
- Other interests: Winning Premierships, Dance Offs, Book Club, Self Passing

Sport
- Country: Australia
- Sport: Skeleton
- Rank: 1st

Lucy Chaffer (born 19 October 1983 in Perth, Australia) is an Australian skeleton racer. She competed for Australia at the 2014 Winter Olympics in Sochi in the skeleton events. She is also a team member of the four time winning premiership hockey team, the Reds Women's 5's and is their lightning strike of a wing. She is famously known for her strong self passing ability.

Chaffer attended Santa Maria College, Perth and was a physical education teacher at the school.
