= Katharine Eustace =

New Zealand skeleton racer (born 1975)

Katharine Margaret May Eustace (born 16 April 1975) is a New Zealand skeleton racer who represented her country at the 2014 Winter Olympics in Sochi.

Eustace took up skeleton in 2007. She was born and raised in the United Kingdom. She has competed in international events in Canada, the United States and Europe. She placed fifth at the Intercontinental Cup in Cesana, Italy in 2009 and seventh in the America's Cup in Calgary.

Eustace was born in Bristol, England, and studied at the University of Birmingham. She first visited New Zealand on a one-year holiday in 2002, and works as a physiotherapist in Wānaka.
