= Sarah Reid (skeleton racer) =

Canadian skeleton racer

Personal information
- Born: June 2, 1987 (age 39) Calgary, Alberta
- Height: 1.75 m (5 ft 9 in)
- Weight: 74.7 kg (165 lb; 11.76 st)

Sport
- Country: Canada
- Sport: Skeleton
Medal record
Women's Skeleton
Representing Canada
World Championships
Bronze medal – third place	2013 St. Moritz	Mixed team
Bronze medal – third place	2013 St. Moritz	Women

Sarah Reid (born June 2, 1987) is a Canadian skeleton racer who has competed since 2005. In 2013 Reid had 3 podium finishes including a win in Lake Placid and a silver on home soil in the Whistler World Cup Event. She finished 5th overall in the world cup season. Reid competed for Canada in the 2014 Winter Olympics in Sochi and finished 7th.
