= Hiroatsu Takahashi =

Japanese skeleton racer (born 1984)

Personal information
- Born: 13 April 1984 (age 41) Sendai, Miyagi, Japan
- Height: 175 cm (5 ft 9 in)
- Weight: 86 kg (190 lb)

Sport
- Country: Japan
- Sport: Skeleton
- Club: Systex Skeletonclub

Hiroatsu Takahashi (高橋 弘篤, Takahashi Hiroatsu; born 13 April 1984) is a Japanese skeleton racer. He is a participant at the 2014 Winter Olympics in Sochi.
