= John Fairbairn (skeleton racer) =

Canadian skeleton racer

Personal information
- Born: 28 December 1983 (age 42) London, Ontario, Canada
- Height: 1.77 m (5 ft 10 in)

Sport
- Country: Canada
- Sport: Skeleton
Medal record
Men's skeleton
Representing Canada
World Championships
Bronze medal – third place	2012 Lake Placid	Mixed team

John Fairbairn (born 28 December 1983) is an Olympic Canadian skeleton racer.
