= Kyle Tress =

American Olympic skeleton racer (born 1981)

Personal information
- Nationality: American
- Born: May 29, 1981 (age 43)
- Years active: 2002–2017
- Height: 183 cm (6 ft 0 in)
- Weight: 95 kg (209 lb)
- Website: www.kyletress.com

Sport
- Country: United States
- Sport: Skeleton
- Retired: 2017
- Now coaching: Japan

Kyle Tress (born May 29, 1981) is an American Olympic skeleton racer who competed from 2002 until 2017. He placed 25th in the 2011 FIBT World Championships in Konigssee, Germany. His best World Cup finish was 5th in the men's event at St. Moritz, Switzerland on January 11, 2013, and Lake Placid, New York, on November 5, 2012. On January 18, 2014, Tress was named to the 2014 Olympic team. His last World Cup race was in February 2017, at Igls, where he finished in 19th place; the following season, Tress began coaching the Japanese national team.

== Personal life ==
A native of New Jersey, Tress graduated in 1999 from South Hunterdon Regional High School.

Tress lives and trains in Lake Placid, New York, at the United States Olympic Training Center.

He will be attending Yale University in the fall of 2018.
