= Canada Olympic Park bobsleigh, luge, and skeleton track =

Athletic track in Calgary, Alberta

Canada Olympic Park Bobsleigh & Luge Track
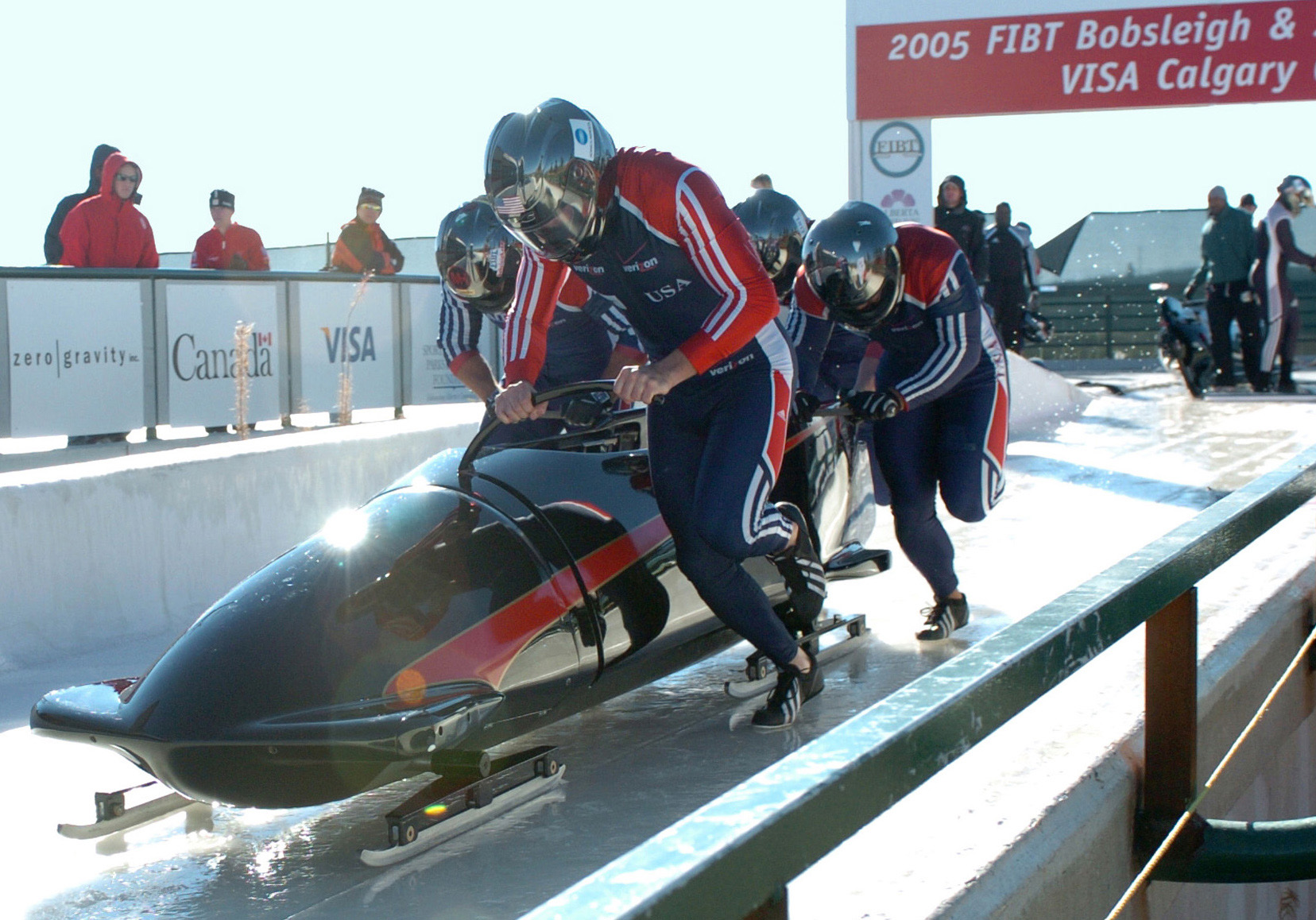
- American Mike Kohn (front left) pushing his four-man team to a third-place finish at the US National Bobsled trial held in Calgary on October 22–23, 2005.
- Interactive map of Canada Olympic Park Bobsleigh & Luge Track
- Location: Calgary, Alberta, Canada
- Coordinates: 51°04′47″N 114°12′57″W
- Operator: WinSport
- Surface: Artificial-Refrigerated Concrete

Construction
- Groundbreaking: Fall 1984
- Opened: February 1986
- Closed: 3 March 2019
- Cost: $27,000,000 CAD
- Architect: IBG + Partner

Website
- https://www.winsport.ca/

The Canada Olympic Park bobsleigh, luge, and skeleton track was a bobsleigh, luge, and skeleton track located in Calgary, Alberta. Part of Canada Olympic Park, it hosted the bobsleigh and luge competitions at the 1988 Winter Olympics. This track is one of only two of its type in the world to be featured in a non-documentary film when it was part of the 1993 American film Cool Runnings which loosely followed the Jamaican Bobsled Team during their competition in bobsleigh at the 1988 Games (the other was the 1981 British film For Your Eyes Only which included scenes from the bobsleigh track in Cortina d'Ampezzo, Italy). The bobsleigh start was demolished in 2019 following bobsleigh proving runs down the upper luge start. As part of an effort to reduce operating costs and replace aging equipment. Prior to reopening the track, the upper luge start will require reconfiguration to accommodate a bobsleigh and skeleton in-run, however funding for further restoration has yet to be secured and the track, in its truncated state, remains closed indefinitely.

== History ==
In 1981, Calgary was awarded the 1988 Winter Olympics over Falun, Sweden and Cortina d'Ampezzo. The track was constructed on a fast-track program running from fall 1984 to spring 1986. This was done with the help of East German technology and a consulting firm from Canada. It was the first combined track in North America and only the second of its type on the continent (Lake Placid, New York in the United States bobsleigh and luge tracks were separate when Calgary's construction was completed in spring 1986 though the Lake Placid track would be rebuilt as a combination track in January 2000.). During the 1988 Winter Olympics, the bobsleigh team from Jamaica debuted at these games, but crashed out during the third run of the four-man event. The story of the team would later be part of the 1993 film Cool Runnings with scenes done at the track. Skeleton was introduced to the track in the late 1980s with the track hosting the FIBT World Championships for skeleton in 1992. An indoor iced push facility near the track opened up in 2001. When competition does not occur on the track, it offers programs for bobsleigh and luge open to the public.

On 5 February 2019, WinSport (the operator of the track) announced that due to an $8 million CAD funding shortfall, the track would cease operations after the completion of the IBSF World Cup that year. On 3 March 2019, the track closed indefinitely, pending the funding of a $25 million CAD renovation. While the sliding facilities have closed for winter operations (due to the refrigeration system needing total replacement), the track would still be available for summer training and tourism, and the Ice House would remain open.

Map of the Calgary Olympic Park Bobsleigh, Luge, & Skeleton Track

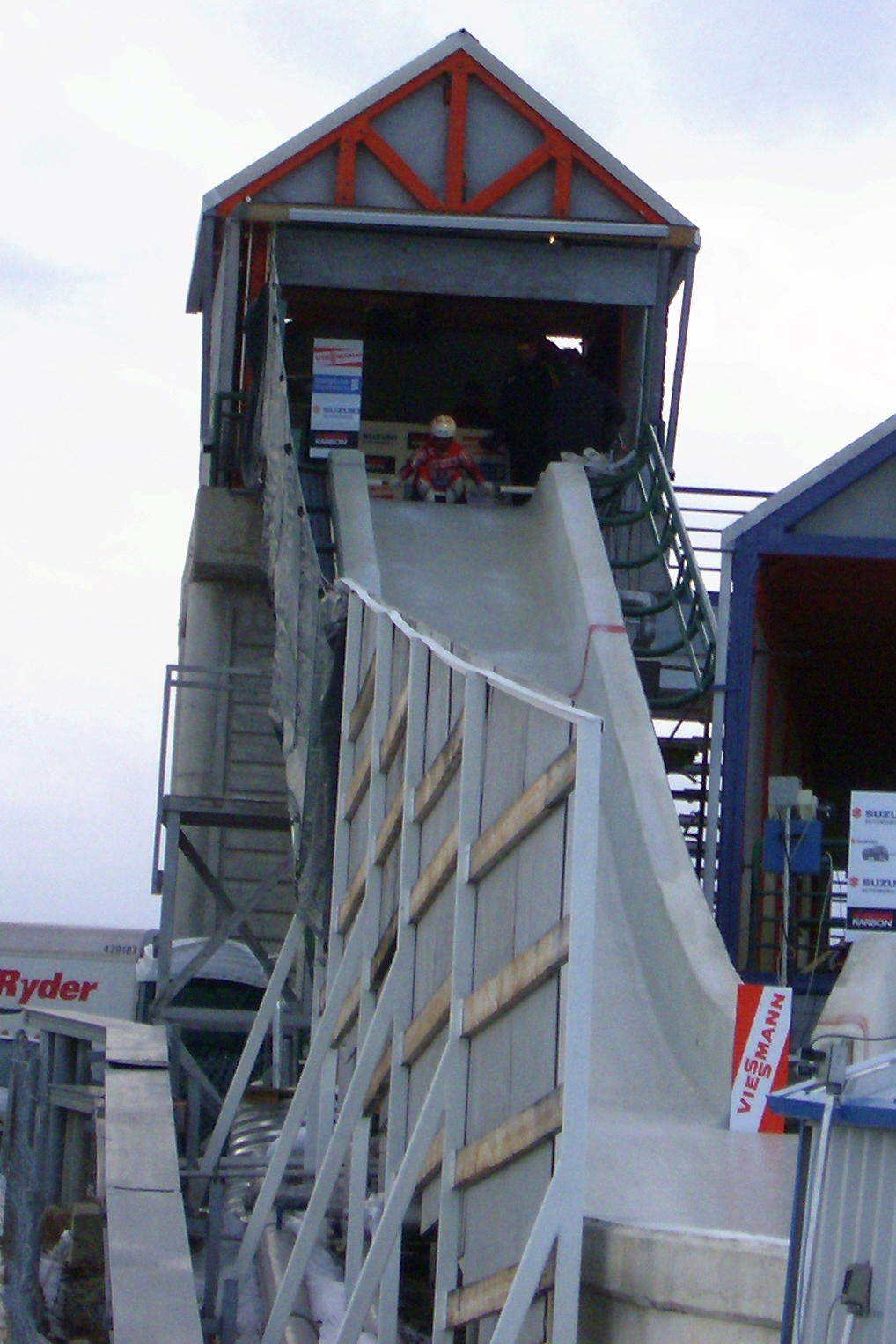
Unidentified luger at the men's tower start house at the Canada Olympic Park bobsleigh, luge, and skeleton track during World Cup competition on December 9, 2006.

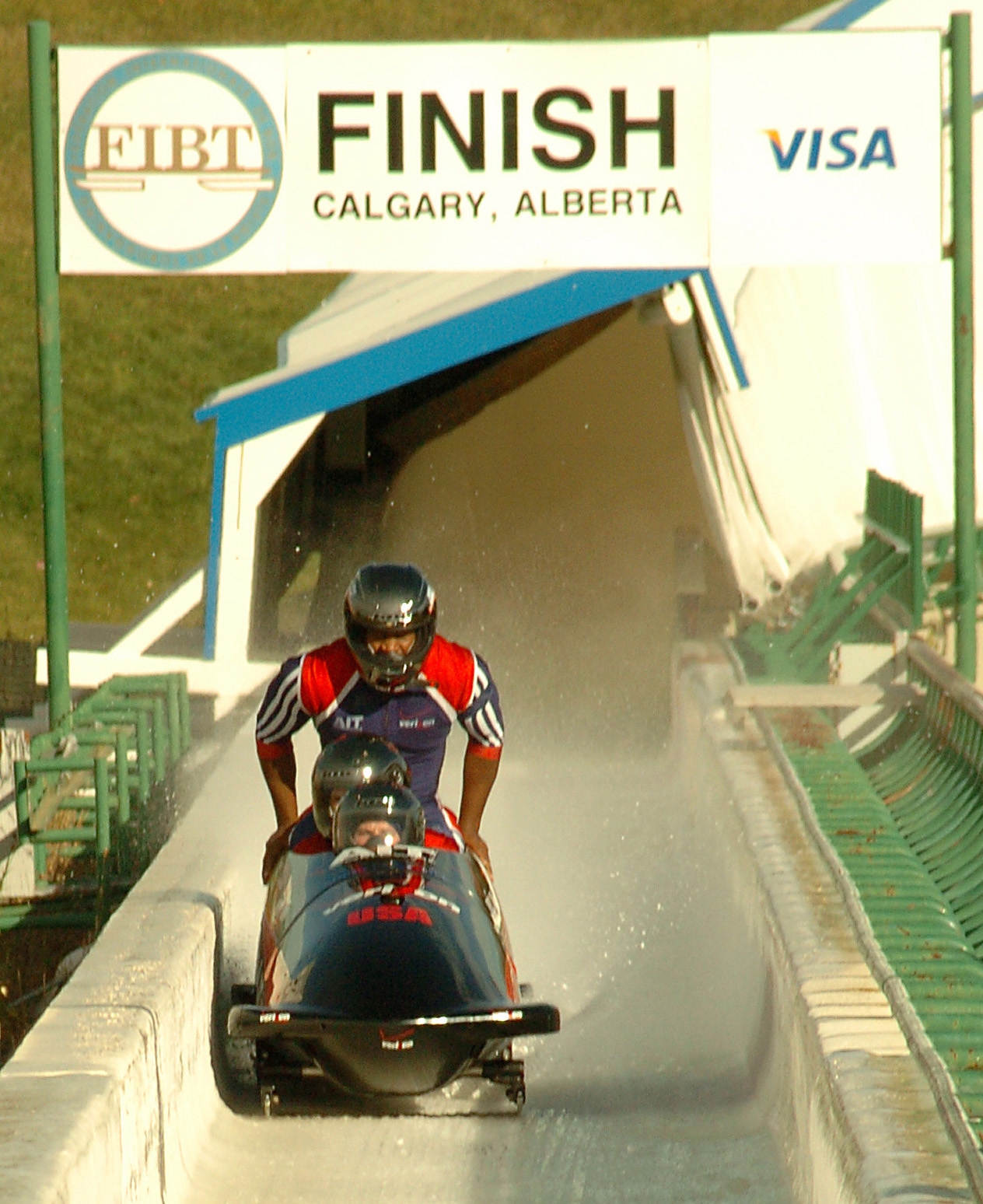
An American bobsleigh team, driven by Steve Holcomb (front), finishing first in the final day of US National Bobsled trials held in Calgary on November 2, 2005.

== Track technical details ==
Costing C$ 27 million to complete, the track consisted of 48 reinforced concrete sections with five separate starting points. The facility is designed of that like a tuning fork with separate bobsleigh and luge start houses, selected to lessen construction and maintenance costs. The two portions of the track merge at turn five prior to the Omega combination curve. Lined with 100 km (62 mi) of refrigeration coolant, the track can hold ice at air temperatures up to 20 deg C (68 deg F). Sunscreens were installed on curves directly exposed to the sunlight to keep the track smooth and prevent melting. Electronic timing systems include double photo sensors at the start and finish positions of the track and artificial lighting is used to allow for night runs on the track. Lighting was adjusted at the request of the host television broadcaster (Canadian Broadcasting Corporation) prior to the games to ensure proper video coverage for the 1988 games.

== Renovation ==
On 5 April 2017 a $20 million CAD renovation was announced as part of WinSport's ongoing intention to operate the track in addition to Calgary's potential bid for the 2026 Olympic Winter Games. Despite a referendum rejecting Calgary's 2026 bid and subsequent closure of the track, WinSport announced renovations will begin and proceed as funding becomes available. On 9 October 2019 the first phase of the renovation project for the track began with the demolition of the bobsleigh/skeleton start portion of the track (curves 1–5). The bobsleigh/skeleton start was removed to reduce operating costs and make the track more exciting for those athletes who will now start on the luge portion of the track. Until the renovation of the track is complete—including the replacement of the entire refrigeration system, the track will remain closed.

== Statistics ==
Physical statistics
| Sport | Length(meters) | Turns | Vertical drop (start to finish) | Average grade (%) |
|---|---|---|---|---|
| Bobsleigh and skeleton | 1475 | 14 | 121.48 | 8 |
| Luge - men's & women's singles | 1251 | 14 | 104.2 | 8.3 |
| Luge - men's doubles | 1081 | 10 | 81.2 | 7.5 |

Men's start at the tower start house (currently demolished) at the top of the track while the women's is at the regular start house at the top of the track.

Turns
| Turn Number | Name | Reason named |
|---|---|---|
| 6., 7., 8. | Omega or Omega combination | After the Omega shape. |
| 9. | Kreisel | 270-degree circular curve. |
| 10., 11., 12., 13. | Labyrinth | Four quick turns in succession without a straight (labyrinth) |
| 14. | Finish Curve | After the curve before the finish line. |

The turn names were initially given during the 1988 Winter Olympic broadcast (ABC in the United States). All curves shown are bobsleigh curves. The luge section joins the bobsleigh and skeleton section at turn five. Turns 1 through 5 do not have turn names.

Track records
| Sport | Record | Nation - athlete(s) | Date | Time (seconds) |
|---|---|---|---|---|
| Luge - men's singles | Start | David Möller - Germany | 21 November 2009 | 4.789 |
| Luge - men's singles | Track | Armin Zöggeler - Italy | 30 November 2002 | 44.516 |
| Luge - women's singles | Start | Tatjana Hüfner - Germany | 21 November 2009 | 4.913 |
| Luge - women's singles | Track | Sylke Otto - Germany | 9 December 2005 | 46.543 |
| Luge - men's doubles | Start | Italy - Christian Oberstolz & Patrick Gruber | 14 February 2009 | 1.102 |
| Luge - men's doubles | Track | United States - Mark Grimmette & Brian Martin | 29 November 2002 | 43.564 |

== Championships hosted ==
- 1988 Winter Olympics
- FIBT World Championships: 1992 (skeleton), 1996, 2001 (Women's bobsleigh, men's and women's skeleton), 2005
- FIL World Luge Championships: 1990, 1993, 2001

== Incidents and accidents ==
6 February 2016 - In the early hours of the morning of 6 February, 8 teenagers broke into the Canada Olympic Park's track and, using toboggans, began a slide down from the Bobsleigh start. At turn 5, the teens struck a large track switching element that had been used to configure the track for Luge. The impact with the track switch and the chains holding it in place resulted in death for two of the teens, and serious injuries to the other 6. In November, 2018 a provincial court judge who had been leading an investigation into the incident ruled it to be an accident. The judge also recommended a slew of security enhancements (including: motion-triggered alarms and lights, better signage and barriers, and more effective training of staff) to help prevent another incident of this nature—several of which WinSport had already adopted prior to the ruling.
