= List of German skeleton champions =

This is the List of German Skeleton Champions since 1914.

== Men ==
Year	Location	Champion	Second	Third
1914	Schierke	M. Zentzytzki	G. Gehrken	F. Zimmermann
1934	Schierke	R. Wenzel	H. Wenzel	H. Pfaue
1935	Friedrichroda	H. Wiedermann	Schröder	Schneider
1938	Friedrichroda	F. Herborn	W. Schulz	R. Hettstedt
1971	Königssee	Josef Grubmüller	Hans Kindl	Heinrich Platzer
1972	Königssee	Reto Gansser	Heinrich Platzer	Rudi Häusler
1973	Königssee	Rudi Häusler	Heinrich Platzer	Hans Kindl
1974	Königssee	Josef Grubmüller	Rudi Häusler	Heinz Gessler
1975	Königssee	Rudi Häusler	Heinrich Platzer	Heinz Gessler
1976	Königssee	Rudi Häusler	Joe Stengel	Heinz Gessler
1977	Königssee	Rudi Häusler	Peter Paldele	Helmut Spieß
1978	Königssee	Rudi Häusler	Peter Paldele	Peter Kienast (AUT)
1979	Königssee	Rudi Häusler	Helmut Spieß	Horst Lohrer
1980	Winterberg	Helmut Spieß	Franz Kleber	Heinz Gessler
1981	Königssee	Franz Kleber	Fritz Drevenka	Hans Kindl
1982	Königssee	Franz Kleber	Robert Butz	Fritz Drevenka
1983	Königssee	Franz Kleber	Thomas Freimoser	Gerhard Angerbauer
1984	Winterberg	Hans Kindl	Rudi Häuser	Franz Kleber
1985	Königssee	Franz Kleber	Peter Strittmatter	Hans Kindl
1986	Königssee	Peter Strittmatter	Franz Kleber	Hans Kindl
1987	Königssee	Franz Kleber	Richard Baumann	Peter Strittmatter
1988	Königssee	Manfred Markl	Richard Baumann	Bernd Hilger
1989	Königssee	Manfred Markl	Jochen Reiter	Bernd Hilger
1990	Königssee	Thomas Platzer	Richard Baumann	Manfred Markl
1991	Königssee	Thomas Platzer	Heinz Fischer	Richard Baumann
1992	Königssee	Richard Baumann	Thomas Platzer	Anton Buchberger
1993	Winterberg	Willi Schneider	Heinz Fischer	Manfred Markl
1994	Altenberg	Willi Schneider	Frank Fijakowski	Michael Schunder
1995	Königssee	Willi Schneider	Anton Buchberger	Andy Böhme
1996	Altenberg	Willi Schneider	Peter Meyer	Michael Schunder
1997	Winterberg	Willi Schneider	Frank Fijakowski	Peter Meyer
1998	Altenberg	Andy Böhme	Willi Schneider	Anton Buchberger
1999	Königssee	Willi Schneider	Andy Böhme	Dirk Matschenz
2000	Winterberg	Willi Schneider	Dirk Matschenz	Peter Meyer
2001	Königssee	Dirk Matschenz	Frank Kleber	Willi Schneider
2002	Altenberg	Willi Schneider	Andy Böhme	Frank Kleber
2003	Winterberg	Willi Schneider	Florian Grassl	Wolfram Lösch and Frank Kleber
2004	Königssee	Florian Grassl	Frank Kleber	Matthias Biedermann
2005	Altenberg	Matthias Biedermann	Frank Kleber	Florian Grassl
2006	Winterberg	Sebastian Haupt	Frank Rommel	Frank Kleber
2007	Königssee	Frank Kleber and Florian Grassl	-	Sebastian Haupt
2009	Winterberg	Mirsad Halilovic	Florian Grassl	David Lingmann
2010	Altenberg	David Lingmann	Axel Jungk	Christian Baude
2011	Königssee	Sandro Stielicke	Frank Rommel	Mirsad Halilovic
2012	Winterberg	Alexander Gassner	Maximilian Graßl	Michael Zachau

== Women ==
Year	Location	Champion	Second	Third
1996	Altenberg	Diana Sartor	Ramona Rahnis	Monique Riekewald
1997	Winterberg	Steffi Hanzlik	Ramona Rahnis	Diana Sartor
1998	Altenberg	Steffi Hanzlik	Diana Sartor	Ramona Rahnis
1999	Königssee	Steffi Hanzlik	Monique Riekewald	Diana Sartor
2000	Winterberg	Steffi Hanzlik	Monique Riekewald	Melanie Riedl
2001	Königssee	Monique Riekewald	Steffi Hanzlik	Anett Köhler
2002	Altenberg	Diana Sartor	Steffi Hanzlik	Anett Köhler
2003	Winterberg	Steffi Hanzlik	Kerstin Jürgens	Monique Riekewald
2004	Königssee	Kerstin Jürgens	Steffi Jacob	Monique Riekewald
2005	Altenberg	Diana Sartor	Kerstin Jürgens	Monique Riekewald
2006	Winterberg	Kerstin Jürgens	Anja Huber	Kati Klinzing
2007	Königssee	Anja Huber	Kerstin Jürgens	Julia Eichhorn
2008	Altenberg	Anja Huber	Kerstin Jürgens	Marion Trott
2009	Winterberg	Katharina Heinz	Marion Trott	Julia Eichhorn
2010	Altenberg	Kathleen Lorenz	Katharina Heinz	Sophia Griebel
2011	Königssee	Anja Huber	Marion Thees	Sophia Griebel
2012	Winterberg	Jacqueline Lölling	Sophia Griebel	Marion Thees

== Statistics ==
bold - still active athletes

=== Men ===
Place	Name	From	Until	Titles	Seconds	Thirds	All
1.	Willi Schneider	1993	2003	9	1	1	11
2.	Rudi Häusler	1972	1984	6	2	1	9
3.	Franz Kleber	1980	1987	5	2	1	8
4.	Florian Grassl	2003	2009	2	2	2	6
5.	Thomas Platzer	1990	1992	2	1	–	3
6.	Manfred Markl	1988	1993	2	–	2	4
7.	Sebastian Haupt	2006	2008	2	–	1	3
8.	Josef Grubmüller	1971	1974	2	–	–	2
9.	Frank Kleber	2001	2007	1	3	3	7
10.	Richard Baumann	1987	1992	1	3	1	5
11.	Andy Böhme	1995	2002	1	2	1	4
12.	Hans Kindl	1971	1986	1	1	4	6
13.	Helmut Spieß	1977	1980	1	1	1	3
13.	Peter Strittmatter	1985	1987	1	1	1	3
13.	Dirk Matschenz	1999	2001	1	1	1	3
16.	**Mirsad Halilovic**	2009	2011	1	–	1	2
17.	Reto Gansser	1972	1972	1	–	–	1
17.	**David Lingmann**	2010	2010	1	–	–	1
17.	F. Herborn	1938	1938	1	–	–	1
17.	**Sandro Stielicke**	2011	2011	1	–	–	1
17.	R. Wenzel	1934	1934	1	–	–	1
17.	H. Wiedermann	1935	1935	1	–	–	1
17.	M. Zentzytzki	1914	1914	1	–	–	1

=== Women ===
Place	Name	From	Until	Titles	Seconds	Thirds	All
1.	Steffi Hanzlik-Jacob	1997	2004	5	3	–	8
2.	Kerstin Jürgens-Szymkowiak	2003	2011	3	4	–	6
3.	Diana Sartor	1996	2005	3	1	2	6
4.	**Anja Huber**	2006	2008	3	1	–	4
5.	Monique Riekewald	1996	2005	1	2	4	7
6.	**Katharina Heinz**	2009	2010	1	1	–	2
7.	**Kathleen Lorenz**	2010	2010	1	–	–	1
8.	Ramona Rahnis	1996	1998	–	2	1	3
9.	**Marion Trott-Thees**	2009	2011	–	2	1	3
10.	Julia Eichhorn	2007	2009	–	–	2	2
10.	Sophia Griebel	2010	2011	–	–	2	2
10.	Annett Köhler	2001	2002	–	–	2	2
13.	Kati Klinzing	2006	2006	–	–	1	1
13.	Melanie Riedl	2000	2000	–	–	1	1
