= 2008 German Skeleton Championship =

German Sports Tournament

The 42nd German Skeleton Championship in 2008 was organized on 4 and 5 January in Altenberg.

== Men ==
Rank	Athlete	Club	Time
1	Sebastian Haupt	RSG Hochsauerland	3:50.21
2	Frank Rommel	TSC Zella-Mahlis	+0.21
3	Florian Grassl	WSV Königssee	+2.59
4	David Lingmann	BSR Oberhof	+2.86
5	Matthias Biedermann	SSV Altenberg	+3.17
6	Mirsad Halilovic	WSV Königssee	+3.29
7	Sandro Stielicke	BSC Winterberg	+3.78
8	Frank Kleber	BSC München	+4.95
9	Alex Gaszner	BSC Winterberg	+5.21
10	Alexander Kröckel	WSV Oberhof	+6.49
11	David Ludwig	BSR Oberhof	2:57.50
12	Steffen Rothacker	WSV Königssee	2:57.94
13	Christian Sieger	WSV Königssee	2:58.41
14	Manuel Kniesa	BSR Rennsteig Oberhof	2:59.96
15	Daniel Lingenauer	RSG Hochsauerland	3:00.78
16	William Schmidt	BSR Oberhof	3:05.04
DNS	Alexander Rotte	BSC Winterberg	-:--.--

== Women ==
Rank	Athlete	Club	Time
1	Anja Huber	RC Berchtesgaden	3:56.52
2	Kerstin Jürgens	RSG Hochsauerland	+0.53
3	Marion Trott	BSR Oberhof	+1.52
4	Katharina Heinz	RSG Hochsauerland	+3.31
5	Kathleen Lorenz	BSR Oberhof	+3.46
6	Julia Eichhorn	BSR Oberhof	+3.64
7	Monique Riekewald	BSR Oberhof	+3.87
8	Diana Sartor	SSV Altenberg	+4.65
9	Sophia Griebel	RT Suhl	+8.02
10	Diane Maciejeski	RSG Hochsauerland	+9.26
11	Katharina Hamann	BSR Oberhof	3:04.43
12	Ines Suminski	BSR Oberhof	3:05.43
13	Lena Joch	RSG Hochsauerland	3:10.82
