= 2009–10 Skeleton World Cup =

Skeleton championship series

Winners
- Men's singles: Martins Dukurs (LAT)
- Women's singles: Mellisa Hollingsworth (CAN)

Competitions
- Venues: 8

The 2009–10 Skeleton World Cup was a multi race tournament over a season for skeleton. The season started on 12 November 2009 in Park City, Utah, United States, and ended on 24 January 2010 in Igls, Austria (southeast of Innsbruck). The World Cup was organised by the FIBT who also run world cups and championships in bobsleigh.

== Calendar ==
Venue	Date	Details
Park City	12–14 November 2009	Women's event shortened to one run to excessive snowfall.
Lake Placid	20–22 November 2009	
Cesana	4–6 December 2009	
Winterberg	11–13 December 2009	
Altenberg	18–20 December 2009	
Königssee	8–10 January 2010	
St. Moritz	15–17 January 2010	Men's race shortened to one run due to starting groove issues.
Igls	22–24 January 2010	Also serves as FIBT European championships

== Results ==
=== Men ===
Event:	Gold:	Time	Silver:	Time	Bronze:	Time
Park City	Martins Dukurs (LAT)	1:39.75 (49.74/50.01)	Sandro Stielicke (GER)	1:40.27 (49.80/50.47)	Kristan Bromley (GBR)	1:40.37 (50.00/50.37)
Lake Placid	Frank Rommel (GER)	1:50.88 (55.04/55.84)	Sandro Stielicke (GER)	1:51.36 (55.21/56.15)	Martins Dukurs (LAT)	1:51.37 (55.15/56.22)
Cesana	Jon Montgomery (CAN)	1:55.54 (57.62/57.92)	Martins Dukurs (LAT)	1:56.01 (58.10/57.91)	Jeff Pain (CAN)	1:56.05 (57.72/ 58.33)
Winterberg	Martins Dukurs (LAT)	1:59.06 (58.98/1:00.08)	Frank Rommel (GER)	1:59.81 (59.39/1:00.42)	Aleksandr Tretyakov (RUS)	1:59.87 (59.42/1:00.45)
Altenberg	Michi Halilovic (GER)	1:56.39 (58.61/57.78)	Aleksandr Tretyakov (RUS)	1:56.60 (58.44/58.16)	Frank Rommel (GER)	1:56.63 (58.43/58.20)
Königssee	Martins Dukurs (LAT)	1:35.29 (47.74/47.55)	Sandro Stielicke (GER)	1:35.63 (47.79/47.84)	Frank Rommel (GER)	1:35.84 (47.90/47.94)
St. Moritz	Eric Bernotas (USA)	1:09.15 (1:09.15/0.00)	Kristan Bromley (GBR)	1:09.22 (1:09.22/0.00)	Martins Dukurs (LAT)	1:09.33 (1:09.33/0.00)
Igls	Martins Dukurs (LAT)	1:46.14 (53.17/52.97)	Frank Rommel (GER)	1:46.39 (53.20/53.19)	Aleksandr Tretyakov (RUS)	1:46.49 (53.33/53.16)

=== Women ===
Event:	Gold:	Time	Silver:	Time	Bronze:	Time
Park City	Anja Huber (GER)	51.22 (51.22/0.00)	Amy Gough (CAN)	51.36 (51.36/0.00)	Mellisa Hollingsworth (CAN)	51.37 (51.37/0.00)
Lake Placid	Mellisa Hollingsworth (CAN)	1:54.85 (57.54/57.31)	Shelley Rudman (GBR)	1:55.08 (57.73/57.35)	Marion Trott (GER)	1:55.13 (57.61/57.52)
Cesana	Shelley Rudman (GBR)	1:57.46 (58.75/58.71)	Marion Trott (GER)	1:57.81 (58.98/58.83)	Mellisa Hollingsworth (CAN)	1:58.13 (59.03/59.10)
Winterberg	Kerstin Szymkowiak (GER)	2:04.72 (1:02.28/1:02.44)	Mellisa Hollingsworth (CAN)	2:05.22 (1:02.73/1:02.49)	Svetlana Trunova (RUS)	2:05.49 (1:02.66/1:02.83)
Altenberg	Kerstin Szymkowiak (GER)	1:59.50 (59.64/59.86)	Marion Trott (GER)	2:00.21 (1:00.28/59.93)	Anja Huber (GER)	2:00.28 (1:00.26/1:00.02)
Königssee	Mellisa Hollingsworth (CAN)	1:38.26 (49.48/48.78)	Kerstin Szymkowiak (GER)	1:38.50 (49.42/49.08)	Shelley Rudman (GBR)	1:38.73 (49.53/49.20)
St. Moritz	Shelley Rudman (GBR)	2:20.42 (1:10.54/1:09.88)	Mellisa Hollingsworth (CAN)	2:20.46 (1:10.01/1:10.45)	Kerstin Szymkowiak (GER)	2:20.68 (1:10.70/1:09.98)
Igls	Anja Huber (GER)	1:49.57 (54.91/54.66)	Kerstin Szymkowiak (GER)	1:49.93 (55.23/54.70)	Mellisa Hollingsworth (CAN)	1:49.96 (55.05/54.91)

== Standings ==
=== Men's ===
Pos.	Skeleton racer	PKC	LKP	CES	WIN	ALT	KON	SMO	IGL	Points
1.	Martins Dukurs (LAT)	1	3	2	1	5	1	3	1	1694
2.	Frank Rommel (GER)	4	1	5	2	3	3	24	2	1466
3.	Sandro Stielicke (GER)	2	2	5	8	12	2	7	7	1438
4.	Tomass Dukurs (LAT)	12	4	7	4	6	7	11	4	1352
5.	Jon Montgomery (CAN)	9	12	1	12	7	6	5	5	1345
6.	Kristan Bromley (GBR)	3	9	16	6	13	4	2	8	1306
7.	Michi Halilovic (GER)	9	6	13	5	1	5	17	6	1305
8.	Aleksandr Tretyakov (RUS)	11	7	15	3	2	12	9	3	1298
9.	Eric Bernotas (USA)	6	5	9	7	14	13	1	13	1257
10.	Jeff Pain (CAN)	6	13	3	9	4	8	18	11	1216
11.	Michael Douglas (CAN)	15	17	4	22	11	11	4	10	1048
12.	Zach Lund (USA)	5	10	9	16	9	14	16	20	1004
13.	Ben Sandford (NZL)	19	8	12	11	17	9	12	19	940
14.	Matthias Guggenberger (AUT)	21	19	18	17	8	10	8	9	920
15.	Sergey Chudinov (RUS)	16	14	8	14	15	16	20	12	876
16.	Andy Wood (GBR)	23	18	21	10	27	15	13	14	704
17.	Pascal Oswald (SUI)	13	16	23	19	20	–	6	18	664
18.	Kazuhiro Koshi (JPN)	22	21	11	23	18	17	14	24	629
19.	Gregory Saint-Genies (FRA)	18	15	20	27	16	20	10	26	628
20.	Adam Pengilly (GBR)	24	–	17	13	10	–	–	16	493

=== Women's ===
Pos.	Skeleton racer	PKC	LKP	CES	WIN	ALT	KON	SMO	IGL	Points
1.	Mellisa Hollingsworth (CAN)	3	1	3	2	6	1	2	3	1646
2.	Shelley Rudman (GBR)	4	2	1	4	7	3	1	4	1604
3.	Kerstin Szymkowiak (GER)	10	7	4	1	1	2	3	2	1574
4.	Marion Trott (GER)	11	3	2	6	2	4	7	6	1468
5.	Noelle Pikus-Pace (USA)	13	5	6	8	9	6	8	5	1312
6.	Amy Williams (GBR)	6	4	10	10	4	12	4	10	1312
7.	Katie Uhlaender (USA)	7	12	5	12	13	7	6	8	1232
8.	Maya Pedersen (SUI)	9	16	9	9	5	11	9	12	1152
9.	Svetlana Trunova (RUS)	15	15	12	3	15	8	16	7	1064
10.	Emma Lincoln-Smith (AUS)	8	10	8	25	12	10	12	17	992
11.	Anja Huber (GER)	1	–	–	16	3	5	–	1	930
12.	Tionette Stoddard (NZL)	22	10	13	11	18	17	15	8	888
13.	Amy Gough (CAN)	2	6	7	17	7	–	–	–	810
14.	Michelle Kelly (CAN)	5	7	–	4	10	14	–	–	800
15.	Nozomi Komuro (JPN)	20	14	17	18	21	16	11	15	746
16.	Donna Creighton (GBR)	19	9	16	6	16	–	–	11	730
17.	Eiko Nakayama (JPN)	14	21	15	14	23	19	14	21	688
18.	Rebecca Sorensen (USA)	18	13	20	13	19	20	19	20	672
19.	Elena Yudina (RUS)	–	–	14	23	11	15	13	12	650
20.	Joska Le Conté (NED)	24	23	22	19	20	18	18	19	527
