= 2004 German Skeleton Championship =

The 38th German Skeleton Championship 2004 was held on 10-11 January 2004 at the Königssee track.

== Men ==
Rank	Athlete	Club	Time
1	Florian Grassl	WSV Königsee	2:28,99
2	Frank Kleber	BSC München	2:29,46
3	Matthias Biedermann	SSV Altenberg	2:30,12
4	Thomas Platzer	WSV Königssee	2:30,36
5	Michi Halilovic	RC Berchtesgaden	2:30,94
6	Frank Rommel	TSC Zella-Mehlis	2:31,15
7	Simon Wiesheu	BSC München	2:31,38
8	Wolfram Lösch	RC Ilmenau	2:31,52
9	Sebastian Haupt	RSG Hochsauerland	2:31,87
10	Peter Meyer	BSC München	2:33,10

== Women ==
Rank	Athlete	Club	Time
1	Kerstin Jürgens	WSV Königssee	2:32,44
2	Steffi Jacob	WSV Königssee	2:33,16
3	Monique Riekewald	BSR Oberhof	2:34,21
4	Marion Trott	SSV Altenberg	2:34,99
5	Julia Eichhorn	BSR Oberhof	2:35,39
6	Kathleen Lorenz	BSR Oberhof	2:35,41
7	Melanie Riedl	BSC München	2:35,82
8	Anja Huber	RC Berchtesgaden	2:37,12
9	Michaela Glässer	BSC München	2:37,70
10	Sylvia Liebscher	SSV Altenberg	2:37,72
