= 2007 German Skeleton Championship =

Bobsled championship in Bavaria, Germany

The 41st German Skeleton Championship 2007 was organized on 3 March 2007 in Königssee.

== Men ==
Rank	Athlete	Club	Time
1	Florian Grassl	WSV Königsee	1:38.34
	Frank Kleber	BSC München	±0.00
3	Sebastian Haupt	RSG Hochsauerland	+0.05
4	Mirsad Halilovic	WSV Königssee	+0.32
5	Frank Rommel	TSC Zella-Mahlis	+0.40
6	Alex Gaszner	BSC Winterberg	+0.94
7	David Ludwig	BSR Oberhof	+1.06
8	Sandro Stielicke	BSC Winterberg	+1.27
9	David Lingmann	BSR Oberhof	+1.49
10	Christian Sieger	WSV Königssee	+1.55

== Women ==
Rank	Athlete	Club	Time
1	Anja Huber	RC Berchtesgaden	1:41:05
2	Kerstin Jürgens	RSG Hochsauerland	+0.26
3	Julia Eichhorn	BSR Oberhof	+0.51
4	Kathleen Lorenz	BSR Oberhof	+1.27
5	Marion Trott	BSR Oberhof	+1.33
6	Sarah Sartor	SSV Altenberg	+1.78
7	Katharina Heinz	RSG Hochsauerland	+1.86
8	Sylvia Liebscher	SSV Altenberg	+2.01
9	Katharina Hamann	BSR Oberhof	+2.12
10	Kati Klinzing	BSR Oberhof	+2.23

== See also ==
- Skeleton (sport)
