= 2006 German Skeleton Championship =

Sled racing event

The 40th German Skeleton Championship 2006 was organized on 7 March 2006 in Winterberg.

== Men ==
| Rank | Athlete | Club | Time |
|---|---|---|---|
| 1 | Sebastian Haupt | RSG Hochsauerland | 1:54.57 |
| 2 | Frank Rommel | TSC Zella-Mahlis | +0.66 |
| 3 | Frank Kleber | BSC München | +0.88 |
| 4 | Matthias Biedermann | SSV Altenberg | +0.91 |
| 5 | Mirsad Halilovic | WSV Königssee | +1.20 |
| 6 | Wolfram Lösch | RC Ilmenau | +2.11 |
| 7 | David Ludwig | BSR Oberhof | +3.38 |
| 8 | Patrick Schürer | WSC Erzgebirge Oberwiesenthal | +3.92 |
| 9 | Robin Marschner | SSV Altenberg | +4.19 |
| 10 | Christoph Giesenberg | WSV Königssee | +4.21 |

== Women ==
| Rank | Athlete | Club | Time |
|---|---|---|---|
| 1 | Kerstin Jürgens | RSG Hochsauerland | 1:57:14 |
| 2 | Anja Huber | RC Berchtesgaden | +0.80 |
| 3 | Kati Klinzing | BSR Oberhof | +0.90 |
| 4 | Steffi Jacob | WSV Königssee | +0.94 |
| 5 | Julia Eichhorn | BSR Oberhof | +0.96 |
| 6 | Sylvia Liebscher | SSV Altenberg | +1.12 |
| 7 | Marion Trott | BSR Oberhof | +1.43 |
| 8 | Diana Sartor | SSV Altenberg | +1.75 |
| 9 | Melanie Riedl | RC Berchtesgaden | +1.96 |
| 10 | Kathleen Lorenz | BSR Oberhof | +2.43 |

== See also ==
- Skeleton (sport)
