= 2002 German Skeleton Championship =

The 36th German Skeleton Championship 2002 was organized on 6 January 2002 in Altenberg.

== Men ==
Rank	Athlete	Club	Time
1	Willi Schneider	WSV Königsee	1:58.61
2	Andy Böhme	BSR Rennsteig Oberhof	1:59.45
3	Frank Kleber	BSC München	1:59.86
4	Dirk Matschenz	BSR Rennsteig Oberhof	1:59.90
5	Wolfram Lösch	RC Ilmenau	2:01.46
6	Matthias Biedermann	SSV Altenberg	2:01.98
7	Frank Rommel	TSC Zella-Mehlis	2:02.48
8	Michi Halilovic	RC Berchtesgaden	2:02.52
9	Lars Orlamünde		2:03.23
10	Simon Wiesheu	BSC München	2:03.47

== Women ==
Rank	Athlete	Club	Time
1	Diana Sartor	SSV Altenberg	2:02.21
2	Steffi Hanzlik	SC Steinbach-Hallenberg	2:02.54
3	Annett Köhler	BSR Oberhof	2:05.00
4	Julia Eichhorn	BSR Oberhof	2:05.15
5	Melanie Riedl	BSC München	2:05.52
6	Kati Klinzing	BSR Oberhof	2:05.75
7	Monique Riekewald	BSR Oberhof	2:05.84
8	Sylvia Liebscher	SSV Altenberg	2:06.43
9	Ramona Rahnis	SSV Altenberg	2:07.70
10	Kerstin Jenss	SSV Altenberg	2:10.37

== See also ==
- Skeleton (sport)
