= 2008–09 Skeleton World Cup =

Winners
- Men's singles: (Russia) Aleksandr Tretyakov
- Women's singles: (Germany) Marion Trott

Competitions
- Venues: 8

The 2008–09 Skeleton World Cup is a multi-race tournament over a season for skeleton. The season started on November 28, 2008, in Winterberg and ended on February 12, 2009, in Park City, Utah. The World Cup is organised by the FIBT who also run world cups and championships in bobsleigh.

== Calendar ==
Venue	Dates		Details
Venue	Men	Women	Details
Winterberg	November 28, 2008	November 28, 2008	
Altenberg	December 5, 2008	December 5, 2008	
Igls	December 13, 2008	December 12, 2008	
~~Cesana Pariol~~	~~December 19, 2008~~	~~December 19, 2008~~	Cancelled to excessive snowfall (2,5 meters)
Königssee	January 9, 2009	January 9, 2009	
Sankt Moritz	January 17, 2009	January 16, 2009	FIBT European Championship 2009
Whistler	February 5, 2009	February 5, 2009	
Park City	February 12, 2009	February 12, 2009	
Lake Placid	February 27–28, 2009	February 26–27, 2009	FIBT World Championships 2009

== Results ==
=== Men ===
Event:	Gold:	Time	Silver:	Time	Bronze:	Time
Winterberg	Florian Grassl; Germany	1:54.13 (56.97/57.16)	Aleksandr Tretyakov; Russia	1:54.16 (56.88/57.28)	Martins Dukurs; Latvia	1:54.42 (57.06/57.36)
Altenberg	Frank Rommel; Germany	1:57.41 (57.72/59.69)	Martins Dukurs; Latvia	1:57.53 (57.57/59.96)	Sandro Stielicke; Germany	1:57.77 (57.89/59.88)
Igls	Frank Rommel; Germany	1:46.01 (52.98/53.03)	Aleksandr Tretyakov; Russia	1:46.26 (52.93/53.33)	Martins Dukurs; Latvia	1:46.38 (53.07/53.31)
Königssee	Frank Rommel; Germany	1:34.91 (47.44/47.47)	Florian Grassl; Germany	1:35.91 (47.85/48.06)	Aleksandr Tretyakov; Russia	1:36.03 (48.20/47.83)
St. Moritz	Frank Rommel; Germany	2:15.77 (1:08.08/1:07.69)	Kristan Bromley; United Kingdom	2:16.74 (1:08.37/1:08.37)	Gregor Stähli; Switzerland	2:16.79 (1:08.36/1:08.43)
Whistler	Jon Montgomery; Canada	1:47.67 (53.68/53.99)	Gregor Stähli; Switzerland	1:48.06 (53.69/54.37)	Jeff Pain; Canada; Matthew Antoine; United States	1:48.19 (53.67/54.52); 1:48.19 (53.83/54.36)
Park City	Aleksandr Tretyakov; Russia	1:38.82 (49.49/49.33)	Eric Bernotas; United States	1:38.85 (49.26/49.59)	Frank Rommel; Germany	1:38.88 (49.35/49.53)
Park City	Aleksandr Tretyakov; Russia	1:39.33 (49.66/49.67)	Florian Grassl; Germany	1:39.40 (49.83/49.57)	Frank Rommel; Germany	1:39.56 (49.73/49.83)
Lake Placid	FIBT World Championships 2009					

=== Women ===
Event:	Gold:	Time	Silver:	Time	Bronze:	Time
Winterberg	Anja Huber; Germany	1:57.72 (58.80/58.92)	Kerstin Szymkowiak; Germany	1:57.74 (58.75/58.99)	Mellisa Hollingsworth; Canada	1:58.38 (59.03/59.35)
Altenberg	Anja Huber; Germany	1:59.82 (59.26/1:00.56)	Kerstin Szymkowiak; Germany	1:59.95 (59.26/1:00.69)	Maya Pedersen; Switzerland	2:00.81 (59.67/1:01.14)
Igls	Shelley Rudman; United Kingdom	1:49.75 (55.10/54.65)	Kerstin Szymkowiak; Germany	1:49.83 (55.16/54.67)	Svetlana Trunova; Russia	1:50.00 (55.11/54.89)
Königssee	Anja Huber; Germany	1:38.85 (49.55/49.30)	Shelley Rudman; United Kingdom	1:39.09 (49.84/49.25)	Marion Trott; Germany	1:39.20 (49.65/49.55)
St. Moritz	Shelley Rudman; United Kingdom	2:20.50 (1:10.53/1:09.97)	Mellisa Hollingsworth; Canada	2:20.59 (1:10.43/1:10.16)	Michelle Kelly; Canada	2:21.68 (1:10.95/1:10.73)
Whistler	Marion Trott; Germany	1:49.86 (54.90/54.96)	Amy Williams; United Kingdom	1:50.39 (54.95/55.44)	Anja Huber; Germany	1:50.71 (55.26/55.45)
Park City	Mellisa Hollingsworth; Canada	1:41.62 (50.89/50.89)	Marion Trott; Germany	1:41.83 (50.94/50.89)	Noelle Pikus-Pace; United States	1:41.89 (51.02/50.87)
Park City	Marion Trott; Germany	1:41.28 (50.51/50.77)	Katie Uhlaender; United States	1:41.59 (50.69/50.90)	Mellisa Hollingsworth; Canada	1:41.62 (50.89/50.73)
Lake Placid	FIBT World Championships 2009					

== Standings ==
=== Men's ===
Pos.	Skeletoner	WIN	ALT	IGL	KÖN	SMO	WHI	PAR	PAR	Points
1	(Russia) Aleksandr Tretyakov	2	9	2	3	9	9	1	1	1526
2.	(Germany) Florian Grassl	1	4	6	2	15	8	6	2	1453
3.	(Germany) Frank Rommel	dsq	1	1	1	1	11	3	3	1436
4.	(Canada) Jeff Pain	5	10	4	11	6	3	6	6	1384
5.	(Switzerland) Gregor Stähli	4	5	5		3	2	5	8	1314
6.	(Latvia) Martins Dukurs	3	2	3	4	17	12	12	11	1282
7.	(Russia) Sergey Chudinov	11	6	9	6	10	6	10	9	1256
8.	(Canada) Jon Montgomery	7	11	10	8	18	1	6	13	1209
9.	(United Kingdom) Kristan Bromley	7	12	13	13	2	10	9	11	1178
10.	(United States) Eric Bernotas	7	14	11	15	5	21	2	5	1160
11.	(United States) Zach Lund	10	8	20	14	7	7	13	4	1132
12.	(Germany) Sandro Stielicke	6	3	14	5		5	15	21	1022
13.	(United Kingdom) Anthony Sawyer	17	13	8	12	21	14	11	16	902
14.	(United States) Matthew Antoine				8	14	3	4	7	832
15.	(Switzerland) Pascal Oswald	12	16	15	17	12	17	17	19	794
16.	(Latvia) Tomass Dukurs	14	7	16	16	24	16	20	18	761
17.	(Japan) Kazuhiro Koshi	22	18	17	18	15	15	18	9	744
18.	(Austria) Matthias Guggenberger	18	19	11	6	19	20	23	22	714
19.	(Canada) Keith Loach				10	8	13	14	14	648
20.	(United Kingdom) Andy Wood				24	11	24	19	17	388
21.	(New Zealand) Ben Sandford	14	15			26	18	22		388

=== Women's ===
Pos.	Skeletoner	WIN	ALT	IGL	KÖN	SMO	WHI	PAR	PAR	Points
1.	(Germany) Marion Trott	7	5	7	3	4	1	2	1	1572
2.	(United Kingdom) Shelley Rudman	10	7	1	2	1	6	8	8	1468
3.	(United States) Katie Uhlaender	4	4	5	11	6	4	5	2	1466
4.	(Germany) Anja Huber	1	1	11	1	13	3	10	5	1459
5.	(United Kingdom) Amy Williams	6	6	4	4	17	2	6	4	1402
6.	(Switzerland) Maya Pedersen	8	3	12	10	7	5	7	6	1328
7.	(Canada) Mellisa Hollingsworth	3	dns	9	6	2	9	1	3	1315
8.	(United States) Noelle Pikus-Pace	5	9	14	9	5	13	3	9	1256
9.	(Canada) Michelle Kelly	8	12	10	8	3	10	16	10	1176
10.	(Germany) Kerstin Szymkowiak	2	2	2			7	4	7	1158
11.	(Australia) Emma Lincoln-Smith	14	10	6	13	10	11	14	12	1072
12.	(Russia) Svetlana Trunova	13	19	3	7	11	12	13	13	1066
13.	(New Zealand) Tionette Stoddard	16	11	18	12	8	18	9	16	928
14.	(Australia) Michelle Steele	19	18	15	5	9	17	18	17	850
15.	(Canada) Sarah Reid	12	8	20	14		14	12	14	820
16.	(United States) Courtney Yamada	11	14	8	18	14		11		736
17.	(Switzerland) Jessica Kilian	17	15	13	16	15	21	19	19	722
18.	(New Zealand) Louise Corcoran	20	16	21	21	18	20	21	21	560
19.	(Netherlands) Joska Le Conté	22	22	23	20	20	16	22	22	506
20.	(Russia) Olga Korobkina				17	16	15	17	15	480
