= 2003 German Skeleton Championship =

The 37th German Skeleton Championship 2002 was organized on 22 December 2002 in Winterberg.

== Men ==
Rank	Athlete	Club	Time
1	Willi Schneider	WSV Königsee	1:58,32
2	Florian Grassl	WSV Königssee	1:58,50
3	Wolfram Lösch	RC Ilmenau	1:58,84
	Frank Kleber	BSC München	1:58,84
5	Matthias Biedermann	SSV Altenberg	1:58,98
6	Frank Rommel	TSC Zella-Mehlis	1:59,50
7	Peter Meyer	BSC München	1:59,68
8	Michi Halilovic	RC Berchtesgaden	1:59,82

== Women ==
Rank	Athlete	Club	Time
1	Steffi Hanzlik	SC Steinbach-Hallenberg	2:00,78
2	Kerstin Jürgens	WSV Königssee	2:01,76
3	Monique Riekewald	BSR Oberhof	2:02,40
4	Annett Köhler	BSR Oberhof	2:02,74
5	Melanie Riedl	BSC München	2:03,18
6	Sylvia Liebscher	SSV Altenberg	2:03,28
7	Julia Eichhorn	BSR Oberhof	2:03,75
8	Kati Klinzing	BSR Oberhof	2:03,97
