= 2005 German Skeleton Championship =

Skeleton Championship

The 39th German Skeleton Championship 2005 was held on 8 January 2006 in Altenberg, Germany.

== Men ==
Rank	Athlete	Club	Time
1	Matthias Biedermann	SSV Altenberg	1:56.41
2	Frank Kleber	BSC München	+0.74
3	Florian Grassl	WSV Königssee	+0.78
4	Mirsad Halilovic	RC Berchtesgaden	+0.86
5	Sebastian Haupt	RSG Hochsauerland	+1.39
6	David Ludwig	BSR Oberhof	+3.33
7	Wolfram Lösch	RC Ilmenau	+3.40
8	David Lingmann	BSR Oberhof	+5.04
9	Markus Hentzschel	SSV Altenberg	+5.72
10	Michael Weber	BSC München	+6.64

== Women ==
Rank	Athlete	Club	Time
1	Diana Sartor	SSV Altenberg	1:59:46
2	Kerstin Jürgens	RSG Hochsauerland	+1.04
3	Monique Riekewald	BSR Oberhof	+1.06
4	Sylvia Liebscher	SSV Altenberg	+1.50
5	Marion Trott	BSR Oberhof	+1.60
6	Kati Klinzing	BSR Oberhof	+2.17
7	Julia Eichhorn	BSR Oberhof	+2.29
8	Kathleen Lorenz	BSR Oberhof	+2.90
9	Melanie Riedl	RC Berchtesgaden	+3.11
10	Rachel Baumgarten	BSR Oberhof	+5.17
