= 2001 German Skeleton Championship =

The 35th German Skeleton Championship 2001 was organized on 14 January 2001 in Königssee.

== Men ==
Rank	Athlete	Club	Time
1	Dirk Matschenz	BSR Rennsteig Oberhof	1:40.54
2	Andy Böhme	BSR Rennsteig Oberhof	1:40.95
3	Willi Schneider	WSV Königsee	1:41.79
4	Anton Buchberger	BSC München	1:41.85
5	Andreas Schober	BSC München	1:42.48
6	Jan Voitel	SSV Altenberg	1:43.30
7	Simon Wiesheu	BSC München	1:43.77
8	Wolfram Lösch	RC Ilmenau	1:43.84
9	Michi Halilovic	RC Berchtesgaden	1:44.36
10	Gebhard Dusch		1:44.98

== Women ==
Rank	Athlete	Club	Time
1	Monique Riekewald	BSR Oberhof	1:43.68
2	Steffi Hanzlik	SC Steinbach-Hallenberg	1:44.25
3	Annett Köhler	BSR Oberhof	1:44.66
4	Diana Sartor	SSV Altenberg	1:44.70
5	Melanie Riedl	BSC München	1:45.08
6	Sylvia Liebscher	SSV Altenberg	1:45.81
7	Ramona Rahnis	SSV Altenberg	1:47.52
8	Julia Eichhorn	BSR Oberhof	1:47.89
9	Anke Riekewald	BSR Oberhof	1:48.33
10	Steffi Lindner		1:49.08
	Kati Klinzing	BSR Oberhof	equ.
