= 1999 German Skeleton Championship =

The 33rd German Skeleton Championship 1999 was organized on 3 January 1999 in Königssee.

== Men ==
Rank	Athlete	Club	Time
1	Willi Schneider	WSV Königsee	2:31.09
2	Andy Böhme	BSR Rennsteig Oberhof	2:31.93
3	Dirk Matschenz	BSR Rennsteig Oberhof	2:34.18
4	Peter Meyer	BSC München	2:34.68
5	Frank Kleber	BSC München	2:36.26
6	Anton Buchberger	BSC München	2:36.27

== Women ==
Rank	Athlete	Club	Time
1	Steffi Hanzlik	SC Steinbach-Hallenberg	2:36.28
2	Monique Riekewald	BSR Oberhof	2:41.54
3	Diana Sartor	SSV Altenberg	2:41.74
4	Romy Volz		2:42.01
5	Annett Köhler	BSR Oberhof	2:45.35
