= 2009 German Skeleton Championship =

The 43rd German Skeleton Championship in 2009 was organized on 15 November 2008 in Winterberg.

== Men ==
Rank	Athlete	Club	Time
1	Mirsad Halilovic	WSV Königssee	58.23 (1); 1:01.35 (1)	1:59.58
2	Florian Grassl	WSV Königssee	58.82 (4); 1:01.62 (2)	+0.86
3	David Lingmann	RT Suhl	58.56 (2); 1:02.11 (5)	+1.09
4	Alex Gaszner	BSC Winterberg	58.79 (3); 1:02.05 (4)	+1.26
5	Alexander Rotte	BSC Winterberg	59.53 (6); 1:01.85 (3)	+1.80
6	Christian Sieger	WSV Königssee	59.03 (5); 1:02.46 (7)	+1.91
7	Steffen Rothacker	WSV Königssee	59.81 (8); 1:02.22 (6)	+2.45
8	Christian Baude	BSR Oberhof	59.57 (7); 1:02.99 (10)	+2.98
9	David Ludwig	BSR Oberhof	59.90 (9); 1:02.85 (9)	+3.17
10	Alexander Kröckel	BSR Oberhof	1:00.56 (11); 1:02.49 (8)	+3.47
11	Daniel Liegenauber	RSG Hochsauerland	59.94 (10); 1:04.45 (12)	+4.81
12	Philipp Mölter	WSV Königssee	1:01.46 (12); 1:03.21 (11)	+5.09
13	Philipp Ertl	BSC München	1:01.53
14	Williams Schmidt	BSR Oberhof	1:01.54
15	Christopher Grotheer	BSR Oberhof	1:02.01
16	Christian Poppner	RC Ilmenau	1:03.25

== Women ==
Rank	Athlete	Club	Time
1	Katharina Heinz	RSG Hochsauerland	1:00.14 (2); 1:03.19 (2)	2:03.33
2	Marion Trott	BSR Oberhof	1:00.33 (3); 1:03.16 (1)	+0.16
3	Julia Eichhorn	BSR Oberhof	1:00.12 (1); 1:03.55 (6)	+0.34
4	Kathleen Lorenz	BSR Oberhof	1:00.50 (5); 1:03.23 (3)	+0.40
5	Monique Riekewald	BSR Oberhof	1:00.46 (4); 1:03.49 (5)	+0.62
6	Loretta Huber	WSV Königssee	1:01.98 (9); 1:03.28 (4)	+1.93
7	Sophia Griebel	RT Suhl	1:01.10 (6); 1:04.27 (7)	+2.04
8	Inga Renker	RSG Hochsauerland	1:01.89 (8); 1:04.35 (8)	+2.91
9	Diane Maciejeski	RSG Hochsauerland	1:01.82 (7); 1:04.60 (10)	+3.09
10	Tina Hermann	WSV Königssee	1:02.35 (11); 1:04.54 (9)	+3.56
11	Katharina Hamann	BSR Oberhof	1:02.26 (10); 1:04.99 (11)	+3.92
12	Laura Malaika	BRC 05 Friedrichroda	1:02.39 (12); 1:05.56 (12)	+4.62
13	Alina Hauswald	RRV Sonneberg-Schalkau	1:02.53
14	Jaqline Lölling	RSG Hochsauerland	1:02.68
15	Sandra Winkler	WSV Königssee	1:02.78
16	Katrin Koller	WSV Königssee	1:02.93
17	Lena Joch	RSG Hochsauerland	1:03.02
18	Simone Weigel	BSC Winterberg	1:03.04
19	Lisa Winkler	WSV Königssee	1:03.51
20	Lisa Rettler	BSC Winterberg	1:03.88
21	Johanna Kastner	WSV Königssee	1:05.11
