= 2012 German Skeleton Championship =

The 46th German Skeleton Championship in 2012 was held on 31 December 2011 in Winterberg.

== Men ==
Place	Player	Club	Time
1	Alexander Gassner	BSC Winterberg	1:01.08
2	Maximilian Graßl	WSV Königssee	1:01.09
3	Michael Zachau	WSV Oberhof 05	1:01.19
4	Sandro Stielicke	BSC Winterberg	1:01.29
5	David Lingmann	RT Suhl	1:01.30
6	Frank Rommel	TSC Zella-Mehlis	1:01.38
7	Christopher Grotheer	BSR Oberhof	1:01.43
8	Christian Baude	BSR Oberhof	1:01.61
9	Axel Jungk	BRC Riesa	1:01.94
10	Sebastian Bernecker	WSV Königssee	1:02.01
11	Martin Rosenberger	WSV Königssee	1:02.14
12	Marco Heinrich	BSR Oberhof	1:02.22
13	Maximilian Otto	WSV Lauscha 08	1:02.35
14	Dominik Rady	WSV Königssee	1:02.43
15	Daniel Lingenauber	RSG Hochsauerland	1:02.44
16	Mirsad Halilovic	WSV Königssee	1:02.45
17	Colin Domke	BRC Riesa	1:02.60
18	Alexander Kröckel	BSR Oberhof	1:02.62
19	Kilian von Schleinitz	WSV Königssee	1:02.85
20	Nico Grünneker	BRC Riesa	1:03.02
21	Felix Seibel	BRC Hallenberg	1:04.40
22	Dean Behrendt	RT Suhl	1:05.68

22 athletes were on the start.

== Women ==
Platz	Sportler	Verein	Zeit
1	Jacqueline Lölling	RSG Hochsauerland	1:01.56
2	Sophia Griebel	RT Suhl	1:01.92
3	Marion Thees	BRC Friedrichroda	1:02.14
4	Lena Joch	RSG Hochsauerland	1:02.23
5	Tina Hermann	WSV Königssee	1:02.26
6	Katharina Heinz	RSG Hochsauerland	1:02.28
7	Kim Meylemans	WSV Königssee	1:03.03
8	Maxi Just	BRC Riesa	1:03.85
9	Jessica Fischer	BRC Riesa	1:04.28
10	Anna Fernstädt	WSV Königssee	1:05.00
11	Anna Köhler	TSV 09 Gras-Ellenbach	1:05.19
12	Franziska Petzold	BRC Riesa	1:06.54
dns	Kathleen Lorenz	BSR Oberhof

12 athletes were on the start.
