= 1998 German Skeleton Championship =

The 32nd German Skeleton Championship 1998 was organized on 11 January 1998 in Altenberg.

== Men ==
Rank	Athlete	Club	Time
1	Andy Böhme	BSR Rennsteig Oberhof	1:59.48
2	Willi Schneider	WSV Königsee	1:59.77
3	Anton Buchberger	BSC München	2:01.48
4	Frank Fijakowski	BSC München	2:01.57
5	Michael Schunder	BSR Oberhof	2:02.35
6	Mathias Abendthum	TSC Zella-Mehlis	2:02.40
7	Lars Petr		2:03.29
8	Jan Voitel	SSV Altenberg	2:03.33
9	Jan Seifert		2:03.67
10	Ernst Lisson	TSC Zella-Mehlis	2:04.07

== Women ==
Rank	Athlete	Club	Time
1	Steffi Hanzlik	SC Steinbach-Hallenberg	2:04.01
2	Diana Sartor	SSV Altenberg	2:05.14
3	Ramona Rahnis	SSV Altenberg	2:08.92
4	Monique Riekewald	BSR Oberhof	2:11.26
5	Anke Riekewald	BSR Oberhof	2:13.69
6	Angelika Wilke		2:14.04
7	Annett Köhler	BSR Oberhof	2:20.00

== See also ==
- Skeleton (sport)
