= Skeleton at the 2010 Winter Olympics =

Skeleton at the XXI Olympic Winter Games
- Venue: Whistler Sliding Centre
- Dates: 18–19 February 2010
- Competitors: 48 from 19 nations

The skeleton competition of the Vancouver 2010 Olympics was held at Whistler Sliding Centre. The events were held between the 18 and 19 February 2010. This event was expanded to four runs over two days beginning at these Olympic Games.

== Medal summary ==
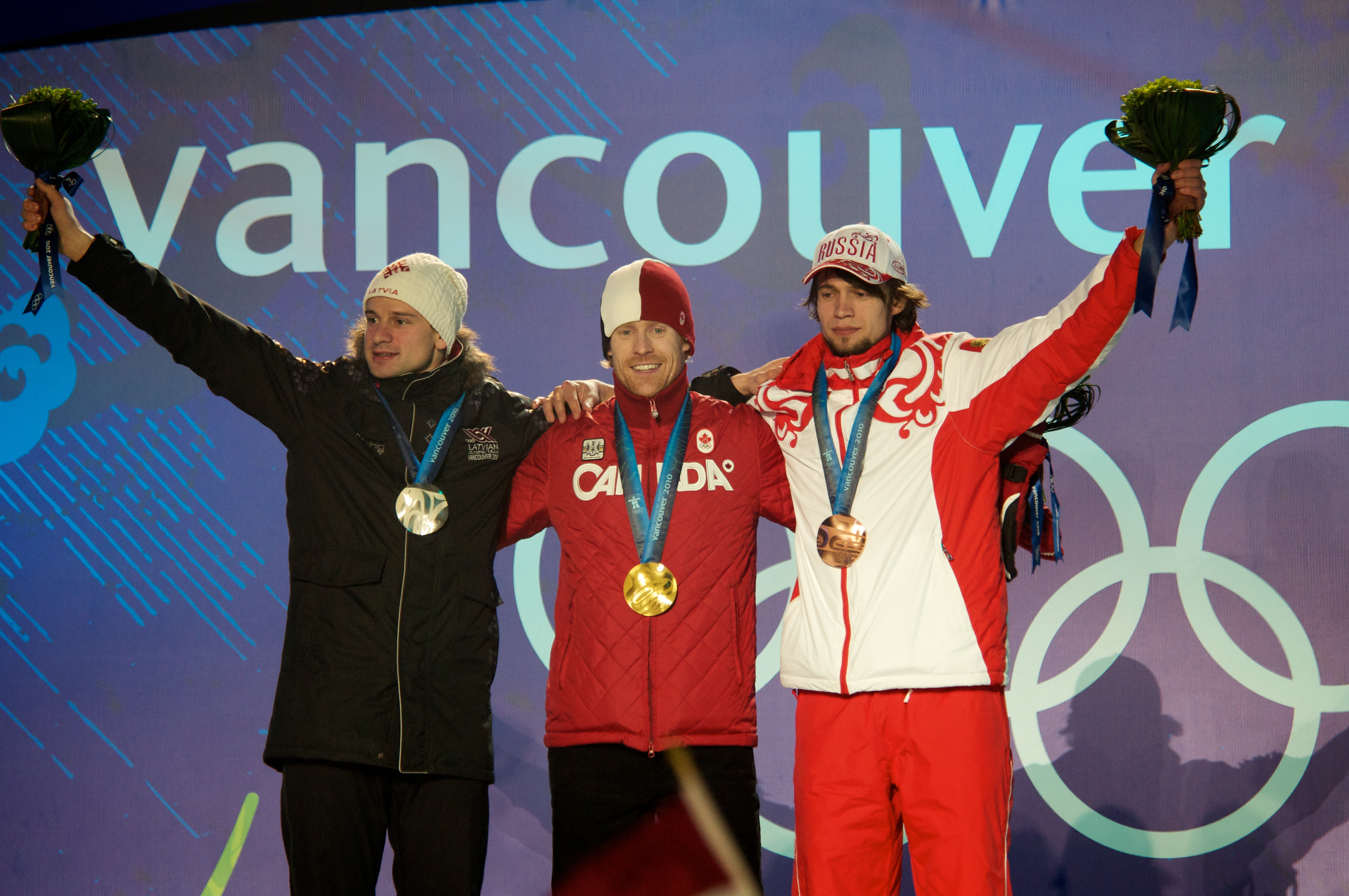
From left to right: Martins Dukurs of Latvia (silver), Jon Montgomery of Canada (gold), and Aleksandr Tretyakov of Russia (bronze) with the medals they earned in men's skeleton.

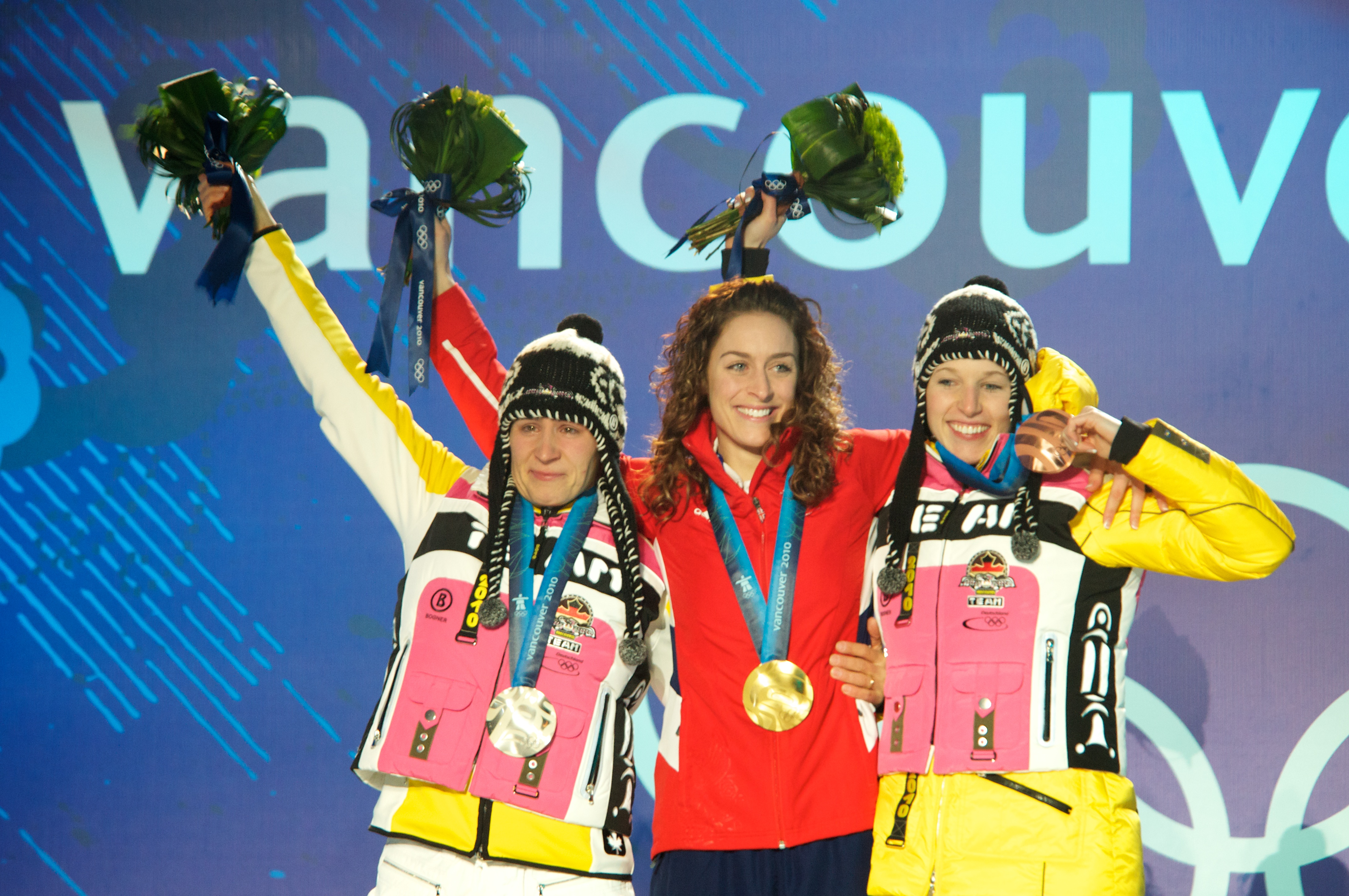
From left to right: Kerstin Szymkowiak of Germany (silver), Amy Williams of Great Britain (gold) and Anja Huber of Germany (bronze) with the medals they earned in women's skeleton.

=== Medal table ===
Rank	Nation	Gold	Silver	Bronze	Total
1	Canada	1	0	0	1
1	Great Britain	1	0	0	1
3	Germany	0	1	1	2
4	Latvia	0	1	0	1
5	Russia	0	0	1	1
Totals (5 entries)		2	2	2	6

== Events ==
Two skeleton events were held at Vancouver 2010:

Event	Gold		Silver		Bronze	
Men's	Jon Montgomery; Canada	3:29.73	Martins Dukurs; Latvia	3:29.80	Aleksandr Tretyakov; Russia	3:30.75
Women's	Amy Williams; Great Britain	3:35.64	Kerstin Szymkowiak; Germany	3:36.20	Anja Huber; Germany	3:36.36

== Competition schedule ==
All times are Pacific Standard Time (UTC-8).

Day	Date	Start	Finish	Event	Phase
Day 7	Thursday, 2010-02-18	16:00	21:00	Women	Runs 1-2
Day 7	Thursday, 2010-02-18	16:00	21:00	Men	Runs 1-2
Day 8	Friday, 2010-02-19	15:45	20:30	Women	Runs 3-4
Day 8	Friday, 2010-02-19	15:45	20:30	Men	Runs 3-4

== Practice ==
Practice was scheduled to begin 15 February 2010 with the field being named the night before. 28 men and 22 women were scheduled to compete. Each skeleton racer was allowed six training runs. Canada's Mellissa Hollingsworth and Jon Montgomery had the fastest first and second runs for the women's and men's practice time on the 15th respectively with the third and fourth runs taking place on the 16th. It also marked the first time that training had resumed on the entire length of the Sliding Centre since the death of Georgian luger Nodar Kumaritashvili three days earlier. Montgomery and Hollingsworth had the fastest times on the 16th with the last training runs taking place on 17th at 09:00 PST. On the 17th, both Hollingsworth and Montgomery had the fastest runs again.

== Qualifying ==
=== Qualified nations ===
Nations	Men's	Women's	Total
Australia	1	2	3
Austria	1	0	1
Canada	3	3	6
France	1	0	1
Germany	3	3	6
Great Britain	2	2	4
Ireland	1	0	1
Italy	1	1	2
Japan	2	1	3
Latvia	2	0	2
New Zealand	2	1	3
Norway	0	1	1
Romania	0	1	1
Russia	2	2	4
Slovenia	1	0	1
South Korea	1	0	1
Spain	1	0	1
Switzerland	1	1	2
United States	3	2	5
Total: 19 NOCs	28	20	48

=== Men's qualification ===
The qualification was based on the 2009/2010 FIBT ranking list from January 17, 2010. A slider must be in the top 60 to be eligible for the Olympics. All current quota places are pending re-allocation of unwanted quotas and re-allocation quotas will go to unrepresented continents in priority.

Nation	Sliders qualified	FIBT rankings
Germany	3	2 + 3 + 8
Canada	3	4 + 10 + 12
United States	3	7 + 11 + 15
Latvia	2	1 + 5
Great Britain	2	6 + 13
Russia	2	9 + 21
Switzerland	2	22 + 30
Japan	2	31 + 35
Austria	2	18 + 36
New Zealand	2	14 + 44
France	1	28
Slovenia	1	32
Australia	1	46
Ireland	1	48
South Korea	1	52
Spain	1	56
Italy	1	57

- Italy was allowed to compete following exclusion of the Netherlands in the quota reallocation on 26 January 2010.

=== Women's qualification ===
Only sliders in the top 50 of the FIBT ranking may qualify for the Olympics.

Nation	Sliders qualified	FIBT rankings
Canada	3	1 + 7 + 9
Germany	3	3 + 4 + 11
Great Britain	2	2 + 5
United States	2	6 + 8
Australia	2	12 + 13
Russia	2	14 + 20
Switzerland	1	10
New Zealand	1	21
Japan	1	25
Norway	1	28
Italy	1	31
Romania	1	42

Romania was allocated the last quota from The Netherlands on 26 January 2010.

=== Athlete/NOC quota ===
50 athletes are allowed to compete in accordance with the International Olympic Committee and the International Bobsleigh and Tobogganing Federation (FIBT). This includes 30 for the men's event and 20 for the women's event.

=== Qualification system ===
Athletes from five continents recognized by the FIBT are eligible to compete: Africa, Americas (North and South), Asia, Europe, and Oceania. Each continent has a maximum of one two-man or one four-man team and one two-woman team allowed. If no driver can meet these standards, the continent will not be represented. The best result of each driver will be ranked by the FIBT, including World Cup and lesser known Cup. These races scored are the same ones as the World Cup event. These skeleton racers must rank among the top 50 for men and top 40 for women in the FIBT for the 2009–10 season by 17 January 2010, held at St. Moritz, Switzerland. Each country is limited to a maximum of three per gender. For men's skeleton, three countries can send three teams, seven countries can send two teams, and seven more countries can send one team. For women's skeleton, two countries can send three teams, four countries can send two teams, and six countries can send one team. For both events, the host country is included provided they meet the minimum requirements. The NOCs must declare their entries by 22 January 2010. Entering the World Cup event in St. Moritz, the top two countries to have three women's skeleton competitors were Canada and Great Britain. For men's skeleton, the top three countries to have three teams were Germany, Canada, and the United States.
