= Michael Douglas (skeleton racer) =

Canadian skeleton racer

Personal information
- Born: March 31, 1971 (age 55) Toronto, Ontario, Canada

Sport
- Country: Canada
- Sport: Skeleton

Michael Douglas (born March 31, 1971) is a Canadian skeleton racer who has competed since 2006. He played football and competed in track whilst at University in Toronto, and at the age of 30 he was discovered by racer Pascal Richard. He competed in the 2010 Winter Olympics but was disqualified before his third run for failing to remove the covers off the runner guards of his sled.

== Early life ==
Douglas was born in Toronto, Ontario and raised in Kleinburg. He attended King City Secondary School, from which he graduated in 1990. He studied at Fanshawe College and went on to play Canadian football for the University of Toronto as a cornerback. He gave up football after as backup to the first team and moved onto athletics instead, a decision he says he has since regretted as the football team went on to win the Vanier Cup three years later, with a team that featured several players who too were backup players when Douglas was on the team.

== Skeleton racing ==
Skeleton racer Pascal Richard spotted Douglas playing soccer and suggested he try skeleton instead, resulting in Douglas starting to race at the age of 30. He started on the European circuit in 2004, and moved to the World Cup circuit in 2007. He failed to qualify for the 2008 team by two tenths of a second, resulting in him being removed from the team. He returned in the 2009–10 season, taking the place of Keith Loach, who he beat again in a two race runoff to join Jeff Pain and Jon Montgomery in the Olympic team.

Whilst racing on the track used in the 2006 Winter Olympics at Cesana Pariol in Italy, he was part of a Canadian team holding all three top spots. However, after the second run through, Douglas dropped into the fourth place where he finished.

At the 2010 Winter Olympics he placed in fifth position following the first run, but his second run was slower resulting in him going into the final run in seventh place and was considered to be in the running for a bronze medal. Douglas spoke of his runs, "That second run was not very good for me, I’ve been generally consistent here, and that (second result is) not where I want to be. So we’ll clean it up tomorrow and hopefully get up on the podium."

However he was late removing the runner guards off of his sled by three minutes in the parc fermé (a holding area for the sleds prior to the race), and was disqualified from the race. Warmer sled runners can cut through the ice on the track faster, Fédération Internationale de Bobsleigh et de Tobogganing (FIBT) spokesman Don Krone explained, "The reasons the runners need to be uncovered is so that they're all at the same ambient air temperature, It's a standard procedure at every single skeleton competition, so the procedures are well known. It's not something different for the Olympic Games." Teammate Jon Montgomery went on to win the gold medal.

As of the end of the 2010–11 season, Douglas is ranked 13th overall according to the FIBT rankings making him the second highest Canadian competitor. This included a season high placing of 6th at St. Moritz, Switzerland, where he beat Olympic champion Jon Montgomery.

== Personal life ==
When not racing, Douglas is a radiologic technologist at the Foothills Medical Centre in Calgary.
