= Trunov =

Trunov (Russian: Трунов) is a Russian masculine surname, its feminine counterpart is Trunova. Notable people with the surname include:

- Ihor Trunov
- Svetlana Trunova (born 1983), Russian skeleton racer
