= Amy Williams =

British skeleton racer and TV presenter

Amy Williams MBE,
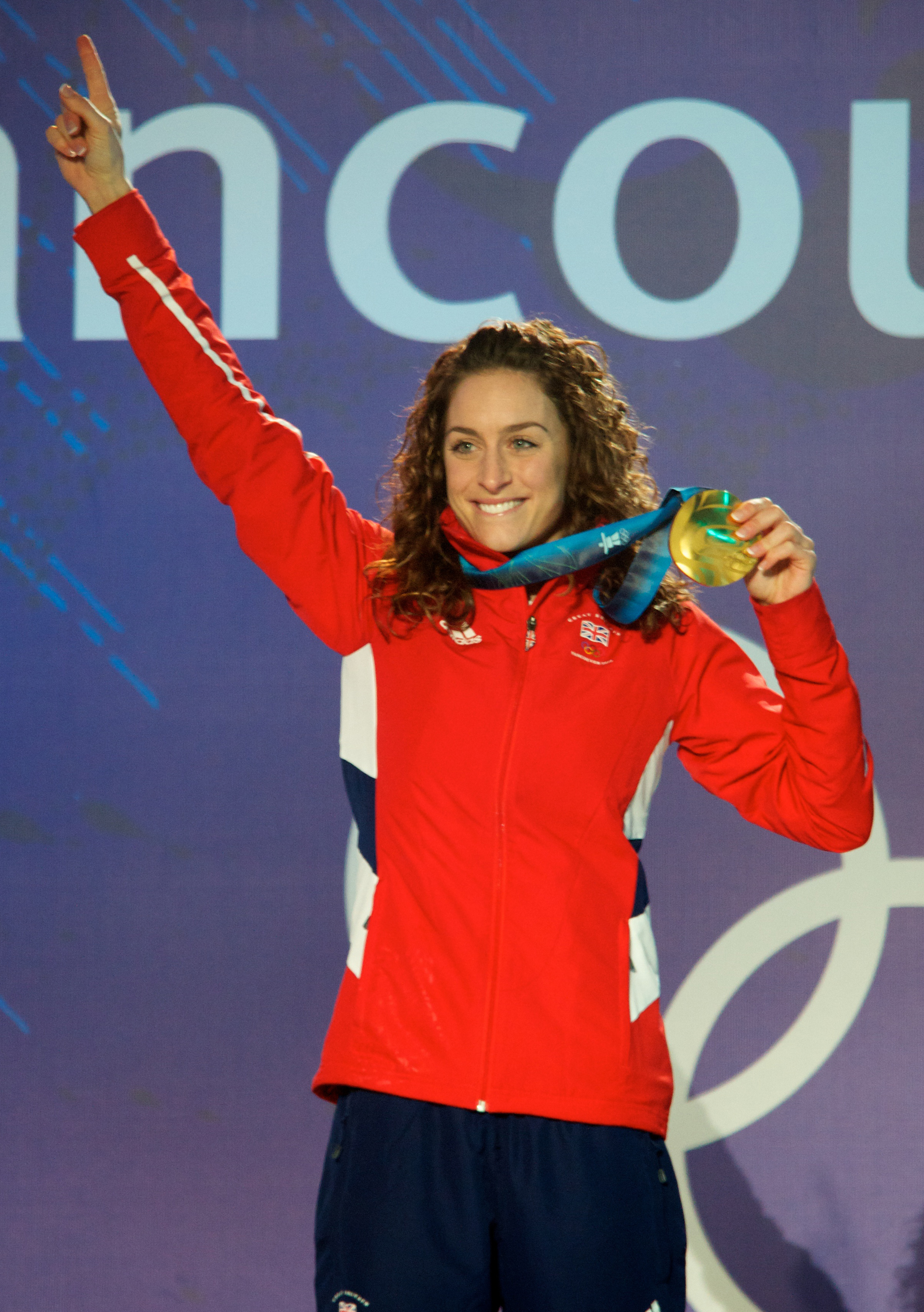
- Williams receiving her gold medal at the 2010 Winter Olympics in Vancouver

Personal information
- Nickname: Curly Wurly
- Born: Amy Joy Williams; 29 September 1982 (age 44) Cambridge, Cambridgeshire, England
- Height: 173 cm (5 ft 8 in)
- Weight: 60 kg (132 lb)
- Website: https://www.amywilliams.com/

Sport
- Sport: Skeleton
- Coached by: Michael Grünberger
Medal record
Women's skeleton
Representing
Olympic Games
Gold medal – first place	2010 Vancouver	Women
World Championships
Silver medal – second place	2009 Lake Placid	Women
European Championships
Bronze medal – third place	2011 Winterberg	Women
Winter Universiade
Silver medal – second place	2005 Innsbruck	Women

Amy Joy Williams (born 29 September 1982) is a British former skeleton racer who won a gold medal at the 2010 Winter Olympics. After retiring from the sport in 2012, she has worked as a television presenter on The Gadget Show and Ski Sunday.

Williams took up skeleton in 2002 after trying the sport on a push-start track at the University of Bath. She won a silver medal at the 2009 World Championships, and represented Great Britain at the 2010 Winter Olympics in Vancouver. She won the gold medal, becoming the first British individual gold medallist at a Winter Olympics for 30 years and the only British medallist at that year's Games.

== Early life and education ==
Amy Joy Williams was born on 29 September 1982 in Cambridge, and was brought up in Bath. She was educated at Bathwick St Mary, Hayesfield Girls' School and the University of Bath. Her father was a professor of chemistry at the University of Bath and her mother is a former midwife. Williams grew up in a house with no television or computer and was drawn to sports because they offered her the opportunity to go outside and try new things.

== Career ==
Williams initially competed in athletics as a 400 m runner but developed shin splints and was unable to qualify for the national team. In 2002, the University of Bath opened a 140 metres long push-start track, the only one of its type in the UK. The facility is ice-free and was created to mimic the start of a real skeleton race as well as identifying athletes with potential. Williams trained in athletics at the university, and one day in 2002, decided to take part with the other skeleton athletes in their training session. The skeleton athletes were shortly to attend the World Push Championships in Groningen, and Williams travelled with them to compete as a guest. There, a coach advised her to try the sport on ice. She then travelled to an Army ice camp in Norway.

Williams had been studying for a degree in coach education and sports development, but after a year, she left her studies, moved back in with her parents and took a full-time job to help fund her skeleton aspirations. Reflecting back on this stage of her life in a 2010 interview, she discussed how she had made "great sacrifices" and had done everything she could to be successful. She said that she hadn't seen her friends enough and had probably been "a bit of a bore", adding: "Every decision I made was: 'Is this going to help me go to the Olympics or not?"

In 2005, Williams finished runner-up at both the World Student Games and the World Junior Championships. She was unable to qualify for the 2006 Winter Olympics in Turin, as Great Britain were only allowed to enter a single skeleton athlete in that year's competition, a spot won by Shelley Rudman. Williams travelled to the Games as a reserve. She finished seventh at the 2007 World Championships in St. Moritz, and in the 2007-08 World Cup series, she claimed bronze medals at the meetings in Calgary and Park City. At the 2008 World Championships, Williams recorded a fifth-place finish in Altenberg, and won a silver medal at the 2008-09 World Cup meeting in Whistler.

Williams also won a silver medal at the 2009 World Championships in Lake Placid, after finishing behind Marion Trott. Williams was fourth after her penultimate run and recorded the fastest final run to finish second overall. She said that the effects of a virus in the build-up to the competition had initially left her feeling "deflated" but had ultimately helped her feel "less tense".

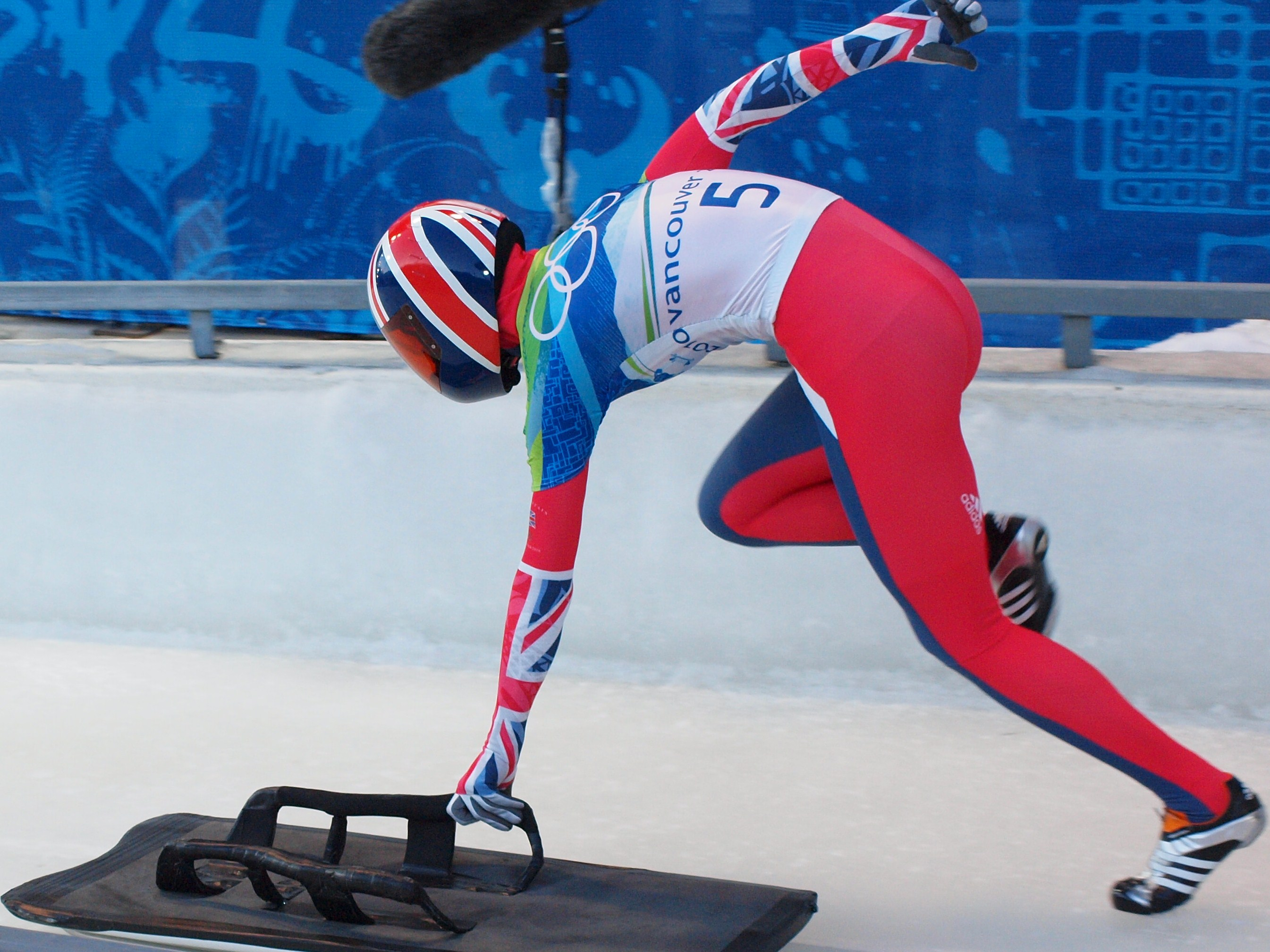
Williams in action at the 2010 Winter Olympics where she went on to win the gold medal

For the 2010 Winter Olympics in Vancouver, Great Britain were allocated three potential qualifying spots. At the Games, Williams won the gold medal in the women's skeleton. She broke the track record twice during the competition and won the event by a margin of 0.56 seconds. At the end of the first day, during which Williams established a 0.3s advantage over the second-placed slider, the United States submitted a protest over the aerodynamics of Williams's helmet design. Canada subsequently filed the same complaint later in the competition. The protests argued that the helmet's spoilers were illegal and gave her an unfair aerodynamic advantage. The manufacturer claimed that they were integral to the helmet's design. Both protests were rejected by the International Bobsleigh and Tobogganing Federation. Victory gave Great Britain their ninth ever gold medal at a Winter Olympics and first since 2002. Prior to her victory, she had never won a World Cup or World Championship race, and Williams stated: "Never in a million years did I think I'd come here and win gold."

Williams became the first British competitor to win a gold medal in an individual event at the Winter Olympics for 30 years, following Robin Cousins's victory in figure skating at the 1980 Winter Olympics in Lake Placid. She was also the first British female Winter Olympian to win a gold medal in an individual event since Jeannette Altwegg in 1952. Williams then acted as flag bearer for Great Britain at the Games' closing ceremony. Her win was Great Britain's only medal of the games. When she returned to her hometown of Bath, she was given an open-top bus parade in her honour. At the end of the year, she was a nominee for BBC Sports Personality of the Year.

In the 2010-11 World Cup, Williams missed the start of the competition after taking a break from the sport. On her return, she finished twelfth in her comeback race at Igls. At the World Cup meeting in Winterberg, which also acted as the European Championships, Williams finished fifth but was the third best-placed European so was consequently awarded a European bronze medal. In total, she recorded three top-10 finishes in the competition, but failed to earn selection for the forthcoming 2011 World Championships.

Williams appeared in several television programmes in 2011, but returned to competition for the first time in almost a year at the 2011-12 World Cup. She stated: "I do feel different and don't have the same complete hunger for it", but said she would give "110%" and see what happens. She stated it was her aim to compete at the next Winter Olympics in 2014, but questioned whether she had the focus to continue for three more years. During the competition, she found herself regularly finishing behind her international teammates Rudman and Lizzy Yarnold.

Williams finished fifth at the 2012 World Championships in Lake Placid, and a couple of months later, on 1 May 2012, she announced her retirement from skeleton. She said that injuries were behind her quitting the sport. She described how they caused her pain, and explained that she had ruptured her knee and that competing was no longer fun. She had also endured back trouble during her career, originating from a slipped disc she suffered in an accident at Altenberg. In 2018, six years after her retirement from the sport, Williams explained how four knee operations and continuing back pain had left her feeling "a little bit broken", and that she had sold her property and bought a bungalow to make life easier.

== Post-retirement ==
Williams was a contestant in both the ITV show 71 Degrees North and Alone in the Wild in 2011. She also appeared in Top Gear series 17 episode 1 where she raced her sled against a rally car in Lillehammer. In January 2013, the BBC revealed that Williams would be a co-presenter on the 35th series of Ski Sunday.

In September 2013, Williams was approached by Tony Jardine, a motorsports pundit and rally driver, who asked her to be his co-driver at the 2013 Wales Rally GB which formed part of the World Rally Championship. Williams first needed to take part in four other rallies to earn her international navigators' license, and these included the Rally Yorkshire. There, in her second rally, the pair finished 16th overall and first in their class at the British Rally Championship event. In November that year, the duo realized their aim of competing at the Wales Rally GB and finished in 26th position.

Williams was named as an Ambassador for Team GB at the 2014 Winter Olympics with the hope that she could inspire the British athletes competing there. In April 2014, it was announced that she would replace Rachel Riley as a presenter on Channel 5's The Gadget Show. In 2016, Williams reunited with Tony Jardine to again compete in the Wales Rally GB and this time they finished 39th in their Mitsubishi Evo IX. The following year, it was announced that she would compete as a driver in the Celebrity Challenge Trophy at Silverstone motor racing circuit.

In 2018, Williams was part of the BBC's team providing coverage on the Winter Olympics, and also that year, she co-presented coverage of the Isle of Man TT for ITV4. In 2019, she was appointed as the first Ambassador of the Dame Kelly Holmes Trust, a charity that enables former athletes to mentor and support young people and newly retired athletes. In 2021, she authored the book Talent to Triumph: How Athletes Turn Potential into High Performance.

In 2023, Williams was named an Ambassador for the University of Bath's Team Bath Tribe programme of sports activities for children. The programme's aim is to get children participating in a variety of sports at the university's Sports Training Village, and develop lifelong passions for sport, with Williams having first-hand experience to share.

== Personal life ==
Williams married her partner Craig in August 2015 in Bathampton, having met him on Tinder. The couple have two sons, born in 2017 and 2019. She has a twin sister and a brother. Her hobbies include painting and creative art.

== Awards and honours ==
Williams was appointed Member of the Order of the British Empire (MBE) in the 2010 Queen's Birthday Honours. She became the first woman to be installed as an Honorary Freeman of the City of Bath on 5 June 2010, and was named Sportswoman of the Year at the 2010 Glamour Awards.

In May 2012, Williams carried the Olympic torch through Yeovil, Somerset, as part of the torch relay for the 2012 Summer Olympics in London. The University of Bath inducted her into their Hall of Fame in 2014, and awarded her an Honorary Doctorate of Laws in June 2017.

== Career victories ==
Year	Event	Location	Runner-up	Margin	Ref
2010	Winter Olympics	(Canada) Vancouver	(Germany) Kerstin Szymkowiak	0.56 s	
