= Jens Nohka =

German bobsledder (born 1976)

Medal record

Men's Bobsleigh

Representing Germany

World Championships
Silver medal – second place	2004 Königssee	Four-man

Jens Nohka (born 5 October 1976 in Frankfurt (Oder)) is a German bobsledder who's competing from 1999. He won a silver medal in the four-man event at the 2004 FIBT World Championships in Königssee.
