= Dame Kelly Holmes Trust =

The Dame Kelly Holmes Trust is a British charity that was set up in 2008 by double Olympic champion Dame Kelly Holmes. It supports retired athletes as they transition from sport, and uses their skills and experience to transform the lives of disadvantaged young people through mentoring programmes. The Trust supports people between the ages of 14 and 25 in all regions of the United Kingdom, and is funded by a combination of grants, trusts, corporate partners and fundraising.

By April 2015, the Dame Kelly Holmes Trust had made an impact on 200,000 young people, and supported over 400 athletes in their transition from sport. It was described as "flourishing" in 2016. The Trust worked directly with 3,198 young people in its long-term programmes in 2016–17, almost three times as many as the previous year.

The Dame Kelly Holmes Trust runs a number of programmes for disadvantaged young people throughout the UK including Get On Track, AQA Unlocking Potential, Sport For Change and Sporting Champions. Young people have been helped by the trust to gain permanent employment despite various difficulties including criminal records, special needs and lack of school qualifications. Other vulnerable people supported by the Trust in 2016 included those leaving care, and young women at risk of sexual exploitation.

In October 2019, skeleton athlete Amy Williams was appointed as the Trust's first Ambassador.
