= Richard Baumann =

Richard Baumann (August 5, 1899 – January 2, 1997) was a German theologian and writer.

== Biography ==
Baumann was born in Stuttgart, Germany. After studying Protestant theology at Tübingen and Marburg since 1922, Baumann was pastor of the Evangelical-Lutheran Church in Württemberg. Because of his Bible study and under the influence of Kirchenkampf during the Third Reich as well as intensive contact to Catholic Christians especially during the Second World War, he came in 1941 to the conclusion that after the Gospel of Matthew 16.18 and Gospel of John from 21.15 to 17 Jesus said Simon Peter was transmitted order to be understood as a continuing until the end of time office, which in the Roman Pope was realized. For a mystical experience on August 19, 1942, at Binzwangen he found himself assigned to unite the Protestant Church with the Roman Catholic Church. In 1946 Baumann publicly expressed view brought him into conflict with his Protestant Church, which it found to be incompatible with their basic beliefs and Baumann in 1947 in the waiting state replied. Since this would not voluntarily give up his office, there were in 1953 first teaching breeding process in the history of the EKD. This process is based on a specially adopted teaching breeding regulation ended with the removal Baumann from the rectory. The procedure and the judgment of the college motto of this method was also used by evangelical authors (in what Hans Asmussen and Max Lackmann criticized) sometimes violently. A key point of criticism of the educational process against Richard Baumann is that the church's motto College, chaired by the Landesbischof had refused to submit a binding teaching on the question of the duration of the Petrine office (as Baumann had demanded it, in this case, he had a has offered to retract his theses), while in fact, the prevailing view in the judgment against Baumann set legally binding. At the Second Vatican Council, Baumann took part as an unofficial observer.

== Later life ==
After he had long sought in vain to find within the Protestant Church for hearing his case a reunion with Rome, in 1982, he converted to the Catholic Church. He died, aged 97, in Tübingen.

== Works ==
- Lord, is it you? (Stuttgart, 1946)
- Peter's confession and key (Stuttgart 1950)
- Protestant pilgrimage to Rome (London 1951)
- Primacy and Lutheranism (Tübingen 1953)
- Rock the world (Tübingen 1956)
- Process for the Pope (Tübingen 1958)
- A general free council (Wurzburg 1960)
- A Lutheran in Vatican (Food 1962)
- By John Paul to (Munich 1963)
- Hope from St. Paul (Essen 1966)
- Due to Luther in Rome (Rottweil / Neckar, 1969)
- Protestant Praise of Mary today (Rottweil / Neckar, 1969)
- Pilgrimage (Rottweil / Neckar, 1970)
- Our name is Peter (Rottweil / Neckar, 1970)
- The large characters (Aschaffenburg 1971)
- The redeemer (Aschaffenburg, 1973)
- The educational process (Rottweil / Neckar 1974)
- Mary hour cometh (Aschaffenburg, 1974)
- Stuttgart-Rome, to reconciliation in Christendom (Rottweil 1975)
- Luther oath and spell (Aschaffenburg, 1977)
- God's wonderful counsel (Abensberg 1984)
- What Christ promises to Peter (Stein am Rhein 1988)
- One of the Cenacle (Heiligkreuztal 1988)
- My 90th Year (Heiligkreuztal 1991)

== Literature ==
https://portal.dnb.de/opac.htm?query=Woe%3D118507532&method=simpleSearch in the catalog of the German National Library

Ekkehard Kaufmann: faith, mistake, right. Breeding methods for teaching in the Protestant church with special emphasis on the case Richard Baumann (Stuttgart 1961)

The rock in the world (in Come-By Nr.5/90 Munster 15 June 1990)

"Peter in Swabia" Richard Baumann's life witness to the unity of Christians, thesis by Martin Hoelter at Dr. Arnold Angenendt Catholic Theological Faculty Münster 1997
