= Pascal Richard (skeleton racer) =

Canadian skeleton racer

Pascal Richard (born 1972) is a Canadian skeleton racer who competed from the late 1990s to 2002. He finished 15th in the men's skeleton event at the 2002 Winter Olympics in Salt Lake City.

At the FIBT World Championships, Richard earned his best finish of 14th in the men's skeleton event at Igls in 2000. He retired after the 2002 games in Salt Lake City.
