= Eiko Nakayama =

Japanese skeleton racer (born 1970)

Eiko Nakayama (中山 英子, born September 28, 1970) is a Japanese skeleton racer who has competed since 1999. Competing in two Winter Olympics, she earned her best finish of 12th in the women's skeleton event at Salt Lake City in 2002.

Nakayama's best finish at the FIBT World Championships was 11th in the women's skeleton event at Königssee in 2004.
