= Rebecca Sorensen =

American skeleton racer (born 1972)

Rebecca Sorensen (born December 28, 1972) is an American skeleton racer who has competed since 2002. Her best World Cup finish was 18th in the women's event at Park City, Utah in November 2009.
