= Sergey Chudinov =

Russian skeleton racer (born 1983)

Medal record

Men's skeleton

Representing Russia

World Championships
Bronze medal – third place	2013 St. Moritz	Men

Sergey Sergeyevich Chudinov (Russian: Сергей Сергеевич Чудинов; born June 8, 1983, in Chusovoy) is a Russian skeleton racer who has competed since 2003.

Chudinov's best result is a victory at Lake Placid during the 2010/11 season on 17 December 2010; he also has other 3 podium finishes. His best finish at the FIBT World Championships was 12th in the men's event at Lake Placid, New York, in 2009. He qualified for the 2010 Winter Olympics where he finished 12th.

On November 27, 2017, the International Olympic Committee banned Chudinov for life from the Olympics for doping violations during the 2014 Winter Olympics and annulled his Olympic results.
