= Pascal Oswald =

Swiss skeleton racer

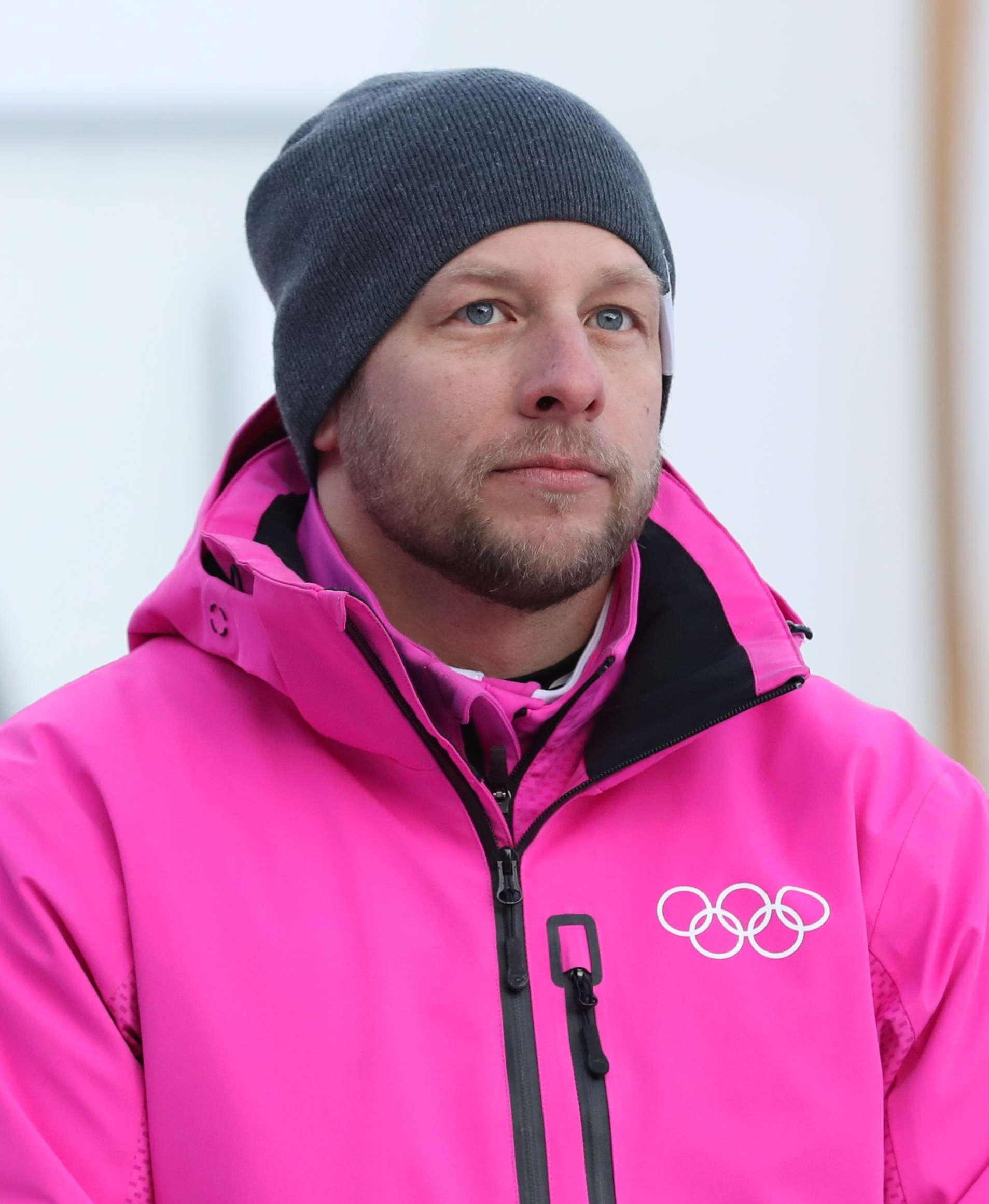
Pascal Oswald (2020)

Yves Pascal Oswald (born 11 February 1980 in Müstair) is a Swiss skeleton racer who has competed since 2003. His best World Cup finish was 6th in the men's event at St. Moritz in January 2010.

Oswald qualified for the 2010 Winter Olympics alongside of injured Gregor Stähli, the defending world champion. He finished 16th.
