= Dirk Matschenz =

Dutch male skeleton racer (born 1979)

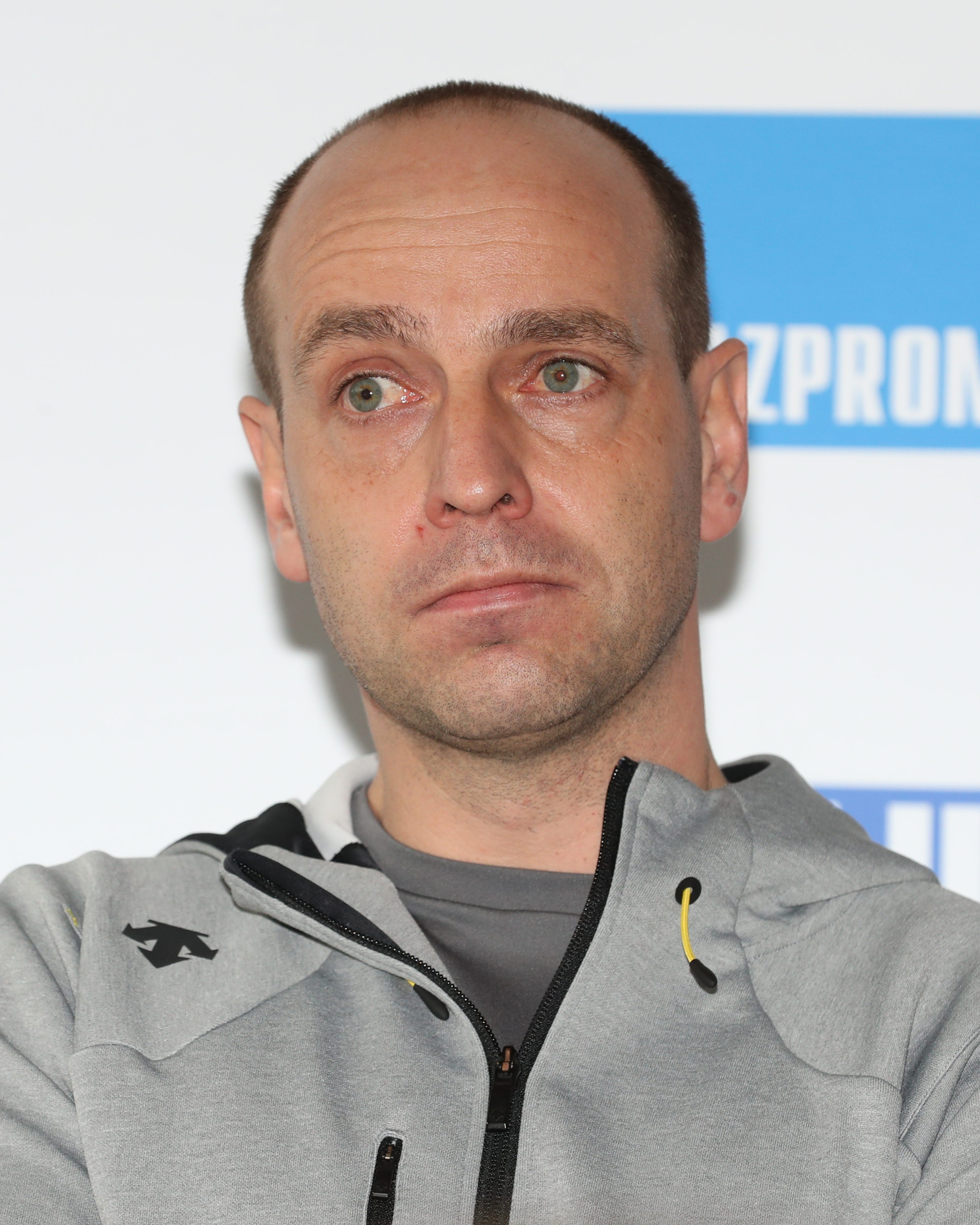
Dirk Matschenz (2020)

Dirk Matschenz (born 30 May 1979 in Erfurt) is a Dutch skeleton racer, who took part in the 2005/2006 Skeleton World Cup trying to qualify for the 2006 Winter Olympics. He previously competed for Germany, winning the German Championship in 2001.

== World Cup 2005/2006 results ==
- DNF on 10 November 2005, Calgary, Canada
- 20th on 17 November 2005, Lake Placid, New York, U.S.
