= Keith Loach =

Canadian skeleton racer

Keith Loach born in Calgary, Alberta, was a Canadian national team skeleton racer and later coach who began competing in 2005. His best World Cup finish was eighth at St. Moritz, Switzerland in January 2009.

Following his competitive racing career Loach was a coach with Canada's team at the 2014 Sochi Winter Olympics, and again at the Beijing 2022 Winter Olympics.
