= Svetlana Trunova =

Russian skeleton racer (born 1983)

Svetlana Valeryevna Trunova (Russian: Светлана Валерьевна Трунова) (born 7 June 1983), now Vasilyeva, is a Russian skeleton racer who has competed since 2004. She finished 11th in the women's skeleton event at the 2006 Winter Olympics in Turin.

Trunova also competed at the 2010 Winter Olympics where she finished 16th.
