= Jeff Pain =

Canadian skeleton racer (born 1970)

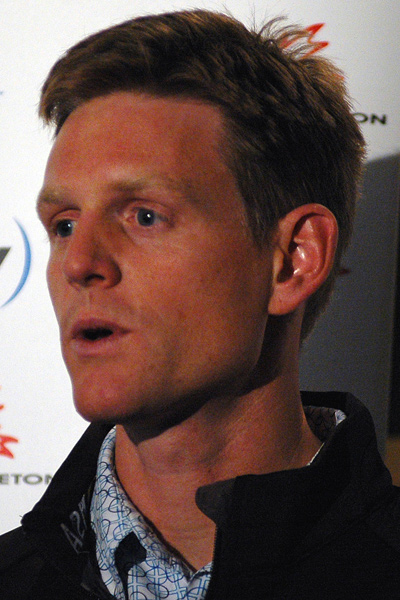

Personal information
- Full name: Jeffrey Thomas Pain
- Born: December 14, 1970 (age 55) Anchorage, Alaska, United States
Medal record
Skeleton
Representing Canada
Olympic Games
Silver medal – second place	2006 Turin	Men
World Championships
Gold medal – first place	2003 Nagano	Men
Gold medal – first place	2005 Calgary	Men
Silver medal – second place	2001 Calgary	Men

Jeffrey Thomas "Jeff" Pain (born December 14, 1970) is an American-born Canadian former skeleton racer who competed from 1995 to 2010. He is regarded as one of the most successful male competitors in the history of the Canadian skeleton program.

Pain was born in Anchorage, Alaska. He graduated from the University of British Columbia, where he was a member of the school's varsity track and field team.

Pain has had a 15-year career with 22 World Cup podium finishes in 74 starts, including ten wins, 3 World Championship medals, and an Olympic silver medal. This included winning the men's Skeleton World Cup overall title twice (2004-5, 2005-6). He first represented Canada at the 2002 Olympic Winter games, finishing 6th, where Skeleton returned after a 54-year hiatus. Subsequently, Pain went on to compete in the 2006 Winter Olympics where he finished with a silver medal behind fellow Canadian Duff Gibson. One distinguishing feature of Pain's skeleton gear is his custom-painted helmet, depicting the face of an enraged beaver. Pain was married to his wife Aly in 1997, divorced from her in 2022, and they have two sons. Pain now lives in Lethbridge, AB and has a new life partner, Stacey.

Pain also won three medals in the men's skeleton event at the FIBT World Championships with two golds (2003, 2005) and a silver (2001).

He finished in ninth place at the 2010 Winter Olympics racing with a badly injured right oblique muscle. In October 2010, he announced his retirement from competition.

In 2015 Pain was appointed as coach of the Chinese skeleton team after the 2022 Winter Olympics were awarded to Beijing and remained with the Chinese team until 2019. Since then, Pain has coached the Austrian National Skeleton (2022-2023), and is currently the Korean National Skeleton team head coach (2023 - present).

== Other sources ==
- Men's skeleton Olympic medalists since 1928 (sports123.com)
