= Willi Schneider (skeleton racer) =

German skeleton racer (born 1963)

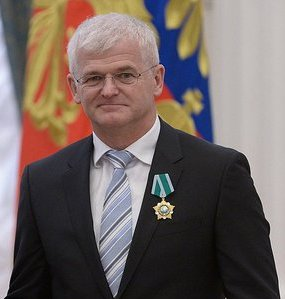
- Willi Schneider is awarded the Order of Friendship, 24 March 2014

Medal record

Men's Skeleton

Representing Germany

World Championships
| Gold medal – first place | 1998 St. Moritz | Men |
| Bronze medal – third place | 1999 Altenberg | Men |

Wilfried "Willi" Schneider (born 12 March 1963 in Mediaș, Transylvania) is a German skeleton racer who competed from 1992 to 2002. He won two medals in the men's skeleton event at the FIBT World Championships with a gold in 1998 and a bronze in 1999.

Schneider also finish ninth in the men's skeleton event at the 2002 Winter Olympics in Salt Lake City.

He won the men's overall Skeleton World Cup title in 1997-8.

After retiring from competition Schneider became a coach, leading the Canadian skeleton team to three medals at the 2006 Winter Olympics in Turin (a gold for Duff Gibson, a silver for Jeff Pain and a bronze for Melissa Hollingsworth), and coaching Jon Montgomery to victory in the 2010 Winter Olympics in Vancouver, British Columbia, Canada. In July 2012 Schneider agreed a two-year contract to coach the Russian skeleton team.
