= Jon Montgomery =

Canadian skeleton racer and television host

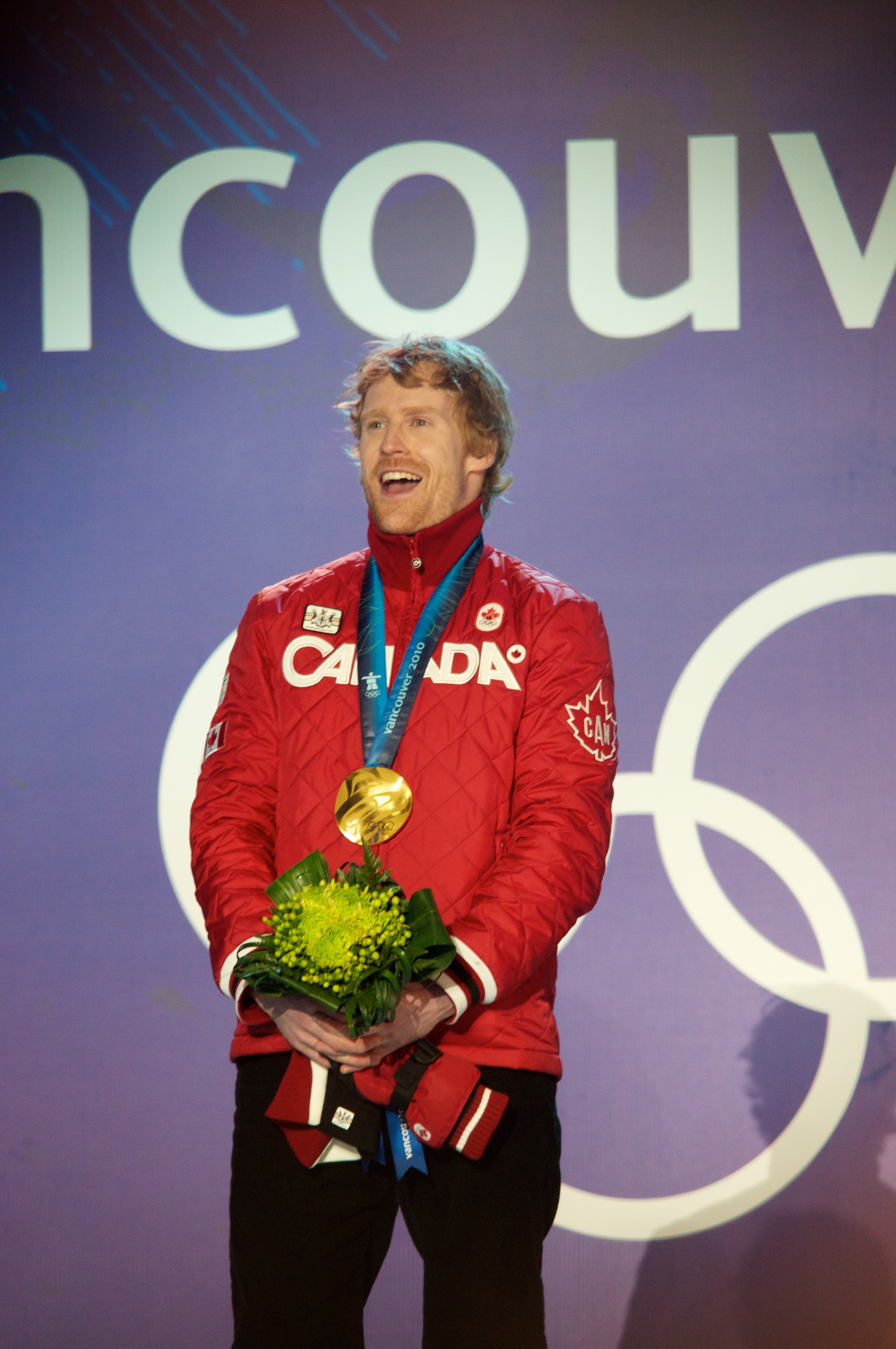
- Jon Montgomery sings the Canadian national anthem at his 2010 Olympic medal ceremony.

Personal information
- Born: Jonathan Riley Montgomery; May 6, 1979 (age 47) Russell, Manitoba, Canada
- Height: 1.75 m (5 ft 9 in)
- Weight: 74.7 kg (165 lb; 11.76 st)
- Website: www.jonmontgomery.ca

Sport
- Country: Canada
- Sport: Skeleton
Medal record
Representing Canada
Olympic Games
Gold medal – first place	2010 Vancouver	Skeleton
World Championships
Silver medal – second place	2008 Altenberg	Skeleton
Silver medal – second place	2008 Altenberg	Mixed team
Bronze medal – third place	2011 Königssee	Mixed team

Jonathan Riley "Jon" Montgomery (born May 6, 1979) is a Canadian skeleton racer and television host. He won the gold medal in the men's skeleton event at the 2010 Winter Olympics in Vancouver, British Columbia. Despite hosting The Amazing Race Canada since 2013, he is best known in Canada for his spontaneous celebration after winning the gold medal in 2010, when he was caught on camera being handed a pitcher of beer by a fan while a crowd surrounding him cheered and sang O Canada. Writing for CBC in 2020, Montgomery stated "If the beer is all I’m ever remembered for, I consider myself the luckiest fella on Earth."

== Career ==
Montgomery started skeleton racing when he lived in Calgary where he worked as an auctioneer not far from Canada Olympic Park in Calgary. Sometime in 2002 he visited the track with his parents where a skeleton race was being held. He was immediately hooked on the sport and soon started racing competitively. Initially he did not do well in his first two seasons competing on the World Cup tour. However, he won his first World Cup race in Cesana, Italy, in 2008. He won two silver medals at the 2008 FIBT World Championships in Altenberg, Germany, in the men's skeleton and mixed bobsleigh bobsleigh-skeleton team event. His highest World Cup overall placing came when he finished second overall in the 2007–08 Skeleton World Cup.

Montgomery qualified for the 2010 Winter Olympics in Vancouver based on his results in the 2009-10 Skeleton World Cup. In the Olympic event he trailed Martins Dukurs after the first run but established the fastest times the following two runs, including a track record 52.20 on his third run. In the fourth and final run, on February 19, 2010, Montgomery still trailed Dukurs by 0.18 seconds, but Dukurs was 0.25 seconds slower on his final run. Thus Montgomery won the gold medal by 0.07 seconds. He celebrated exuberantly at first but quickly apologised to Dukurs for his celebration. He was quoted as saying after the race, "I had said at the beginning of the race that if I was in that position and I did get gold coming from behind that I was going to remain stoic and respectful because you never want to cheer when somebody else loses. But I have to apologize to Martins. That didn't happen. I lost my mind when I saw the .07 come up. It was like I had stuck my finger in a light socket." He accepted his gold medal at the medal ceremony in Whistler on February 20, 2010. Montgomery became the second Canadian in a row to win gold in the men's event, after Duff Gibson in 2006.

Following his win, Montgomery marched through a crowd of Canadian fans singing the national anthem and chugging a pitcher of beer. Writing in 2020, Montgomery explained the significance of the moment:

The gold medal was the goal, but the golden moment that came next is something that you can’t prepare for. When my “beer angel” wandered out of a Whistler pub and presented me with that frothy pitcher of Canadian culture as I passed by -fresh from victory, my helmet still under my arm, cameras catching the moment - all I could do was be myself. In that moment, people felt a connection. Folks can’t always see themselves standing on top of the podium at the Olympics, but my brothers and sisters across our great land can all see themselves standing in a moment of pride and celebrating a milestone met, with a celebratory beverage of their choosing. If the beer is all I’m ever remembered for, I consider myself the luckiest fella on Earth.

In an interview with CTV, he stated that he has a tattoo of a maple leaf over his heart with the word "Canada" above it, which he got with his mother after he graduated from high school in grade 12. He stated that he hopes his gold medal performance inspires more people to enter amateur sports, and went on to reassure mothers that skeleton is a safe sport for children to enter. He also said that he hopes his gold medal victory will help to establish an all-amateur sports channel for Canadian athletes.

Montgomery wore an image of a painted turtle on the crown of his helmet while racing and said he had decided to do so after finding one trying to cross the road in British Columbia. BC Hydro noted his representation of the endangered species (in coastal British Columbia) in describing their sponsorship of research into the turtle's conservation.

Montgomery failed to qualify for the 2014 Winter Olympics in Sochi and then announced he was "99 per cent sure" his skeleton career was over.

Montgomery was among the 2019 inductees into the Manitoba Sports Hall of Fame.

== Television ==
In the summer of 2010, Montgomery and several friends filmed the television special Best Trip Ever, documenting their forays into various summer adventure sports, for Discovery Channel Canada. The special aired on November 27, 2010.

In 2011, Montgomery appeared as a judge for a Quickfire Challenge on the fifteenth episode of Top Chef: Texas.

On June 5, 2013, it was announced that Montgomery would be the host of CTV's The Amazing Race Canada. As of September 2024, he has hosted all 11 seasons of the show.

== Personal life ==
Montgomery is married to Darla Montgomery, who is also a skeleton athlete. They have one son, named Jaxon Mark Montgomery, who was born on August 23, 2016. They have a daughter, Lennon, who was born in 2019.

When not skeleton racing or hosting The Amazing Race Canada, Montgomery works as a sales consultant and automobile auctioneer in Calgary.

He looks up to fellow Russell native Theoren Fleury.

Montgomery is an alumnus of the Canadian Automotive Institute, now the Automotive Business School of Canada, Georgian College.

== See also ==
- List of Canadian sports personalities
