= Katharina Heinz =

German skeleton racer (born 1987)

Personal information
- Nationality: German
- Born: 27 June 1987 (age 38) Siegen, Germany
- Height: 1.70 m (5 ft 7 in)
- Weight: 65 kg (143 lb)

Sport
- Country: Germany
- Sport: Skeleton

Katharina Heinz (born 27 June 1987) is a German skeleton racer who has competed since 2003. 2006 she joined the German national squad. Heinz debuted in Skeleton World Cup in November 2010. Her best result in World Cup is 5th place in 2011–12 Skeleton World Cup. Heinz finished second at the European Skeleton Championship in 2012.
