= 2005–06 Skeleton World Cup =

The 2005–06 Skeleton World Cup took place from September 2005 to February 2006 parallel with the bobsleigh Europe Cup and America's Cup competitions.

== Calendar ==
=== October ===
October 31 to November 6 Lake Placid, New York, United States (AC)

- America's Cup Competition
- Men's & Women's Bobsleigh
- Men's & Women's Skeleton

=== November ===
November 2 - November 8 Igls, AUT

- Skeleton School

November 5 - November 12 Calgary, CAN (WC)

- World Cup Competition

November 10 – November 12 Igls, AUT (EC)

- Europe Cup Competition
- Men's & Women's Skeleton

November 12 - November 19 Park City, United States (AC)

- America's Cup Competition
- Men's & Women's Bobsleigh
- Men's & Women's Skeleton

November 14 – November 19 Igls, AUT

- Bobsleigh School

November 14 – November 20 Lake Placid, New York, United States (WC)

- World Cup Competition
- Men's & Women's Bobsleigh
- Men's & Women's Skeleton

November 20 - November 26 Calgary, CAN (AC)

- America's Cup Competition
- Men's & Women's Bobsleigh
- Men's & Women's Skeleton

November 21 – November 27 Igls, AUT (EC)

- Europe Cup Competition
- Men's & Women's Bobsleigh

November 24 – November 25 Cesana/Turin, Italy, (Trng.)

- Men's & Women's Skeleton

November 25 – November 29 Cesana/Turin, Italy, (Trng.)

- International Training Week
- Men's & Women's Skeleton

=== December ===
December 5 – December 11 Igls, AUT, (WC)

- World Cup Competition
- Men's & Women's Bobsleigh
- Men's & Women's Skeleton

December 5 – December 11 Königssee, GER (EC)

- Europe Cup Competition
- Men's & Women's Bobsleigh
- Men's & Women's Skeleton

December 12 – December 18 Cortina d'Ampezzo Italy (WC)

- World Cup Competition
- Men's & Women's Bobsleigh

December 12 – December 18 Altenberg, GER (EC)

- Europe Cup Competition
- Men's & Women's Bobsleigh
- Men's & Women's Skeleton

December 11 – December 15 Sigulda, LAT (WC)

- World Cup Competition
- Men's & Women's Skeleton

=== January ===
January 9 – January 15 Königssee, GER, (WC)

- World Cup Competition
- Men's & Women's Bobsleigh
- Men's & Women's Skeleton

January 9 – January 15 Cortina d'Ampezzo, Italy (EC)

- Europe Cup Competition
- Men's Bobsleigh

January 16 – January 22 Königssee, GER ( Chall.)

- Challenge Cup for Europe
- Men's Bobsleigh-

January 16 – January 22 Königssee, GER (Chall.)

- Challenge Cup for America
- Men's Bobsleigh

January 16 – January 22 St.Moritz, SUI (WC/ECh)

- World Cup Competition
- European Championships
- Men's & Women's Bobsleigh
- Men's & Women's Skeleton

January 18 – January 22 Königssee, GER (Chall)

- Challenge Cup
- Men's & Women's Skeleton

January 23 – January 29 St.Moritz, SUI (EC)

- Europe Cup Competition
- Men's & Women's Bobsleigh
- Men's & Women's Skeleton

January 23 – January 29 Altenberg, GER (WC)

- World Cup Competition
- Men's & Women's Bobsleigh
- Men's & Women's Skeleton

January 30 – February 5 Igls, AUT (JWC)

- Junior World Championships
- Men's & Women's Bobsleigh
- Men's & Women's Skeleton

=== February ===
February 6 – February 12 Winterberg, GER (EC)

- Europe Cup Competition
- Men's & Women's Bobsleigh
- Men's & Women's Skeleton

February 10 – February 26 Turin/Cesana, Italy (OWG)

- Olympic Winter Games

== Signatures ==
- WB = Women's Bobsleigh
- MB = Men's Bobsleigh
- WS = Women's Skeleton
- MS = Men's Skeleton
- Tr = Official Training
- Tr = Training upon payment
- Co = Skeleton competition
- 2m = 2-man Bobsleigh competition
- 2w = Women's Bobsleigh competition
- 4m = 4-man Bobsleigh competition
- XX = Two-man bobsleigh
- XXXX = Four-man bobsleigh
- EC = Europe Cup Competition
- AC = America's Cup Competition
- CCh. = Continental Championships
- ECh. = European Championship
- JWC = Junior World Bobsleigh Championships
- WCh = World Championships
