= Andy Böhme =

German skeleton racer (born 1970)

Medal record

Men's Skeleton

Representing Germany

World Championships
Gold medal – first place	2000 Igls	Men
Silver medal – second place	1999 Altenberg	Men

Andy Böhme (born 26 April 1970 in Salzwedel, Bezirk Magdeburg) is a German skeleton racer who competed from 1993 to 2002. He won two medals in the men's skeleton event at the FIBT World Championships, with a gold in 2000, and a silver in 1999.

Böhme won the men's Skeleton World Cup overall title twice (1998–99, 1999–2000).
