= Sebastian Haupt =

German skeleton racer

Medal record

Men's Skeleton

Representing Germany

World Championships
Gold medal – first place	2008 Altenberg	Mixed team

Sebastian Haupt (born 17 December 1985 in Heilbad Heiligenstadt, Thuringia) is a German skeleton racer who has competed since 2001. He won the gold medal in the mixed bobsleigh-skeleton team event at the 2008 FIBT World Championships held in Altenberg, Germany.

Haupt also finished ninth in the men's skeleton event at the 2006 Winter Olympics in Turin.

== Bibliography ==
- 2006 men's skeleton results
- FIBT profile
- Skeletonsport.com profile
