= Sandro Stielicke =

German skeleton racer (born 1986)

Sandro Stielicke (born 30 November 1986 in Rostock) is a German skeleton racer who has competed since 2005. His best World Cup finish was third at Altenberg, Germany, in December 2008.

Stelicke qualified for the 2010 Winter Olympics, finishing tenth.
