= Matthias Biedermann =

German skeleton racer (born 1983)

Matthias Biedermann (born 28 January 1983) is a German male skeleton racer, who took part in the 2005/2006 Skeleton World Cup trying to qualify for the 2006 Winter Olympics. He won the silver medal at the first skeleton World Cup race held in Turin.

== World Cup 2005/2006 results ==
- 28th on November 10, 2005, Calgary CAN
- 7th on November 17, 2005, Lake Placid, New York, U.S.
