= Diana Sartor =

German skeleton racer

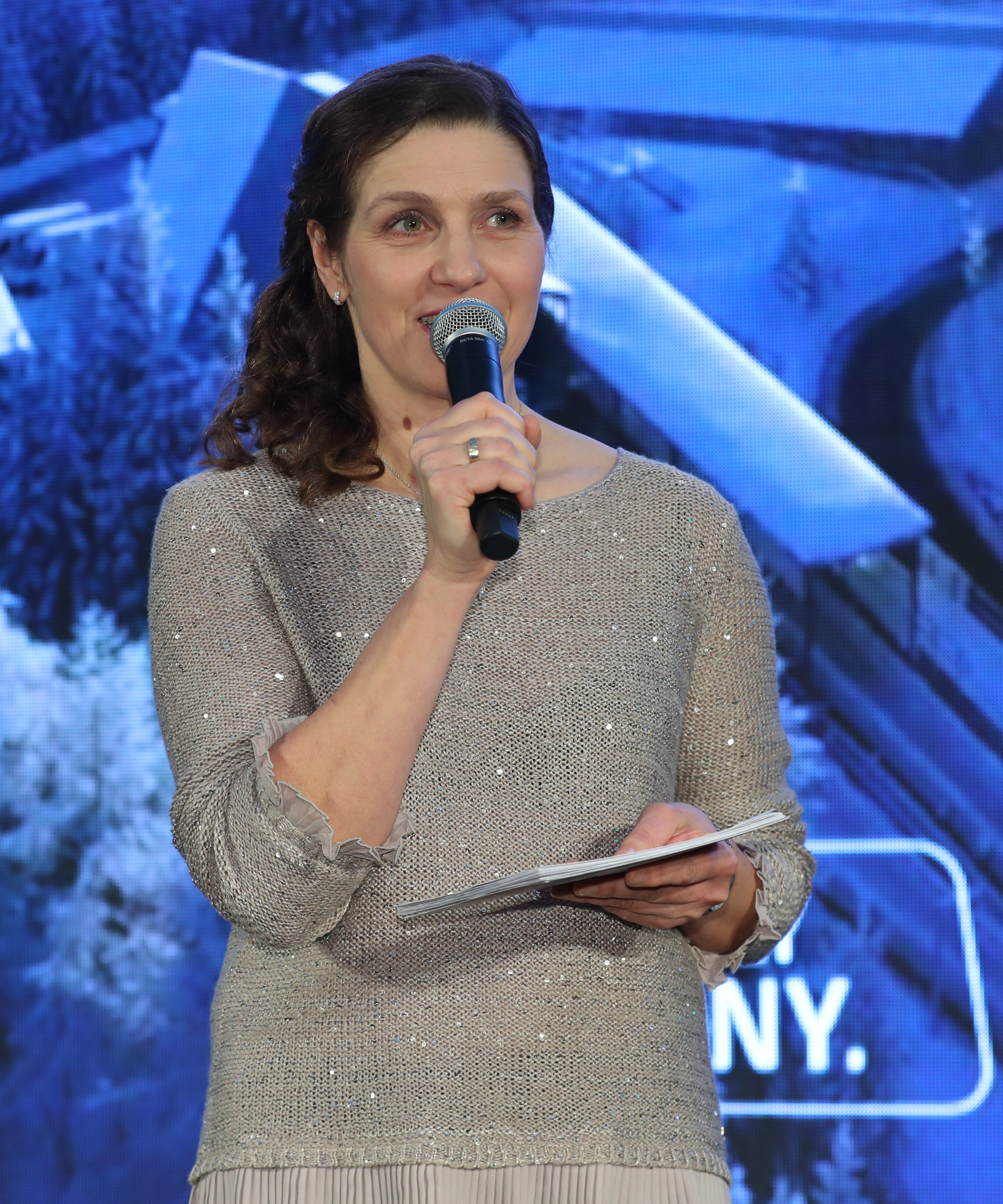
- Sartor in 2020

Medal record

Women's skeleton

Representing Germany

World Championships
Gold medal – first place	2004 Königssee	Women

European Championships
Gold medal – first place	2004 Altenberg	Women

World Cup
Silver medal – second place	2003-04	Women
Bronze medal – third place	2005-06	Women

Diana Sartor (born 23 November 1970) is a German skeleton racer who competed from 1996 to 2006. She won a gold medal in the women's skeleton event at the 2004 FIBT World Championships in Königssee. That year she was also crowned European Champion.

Competing in two Winter Olympics, Sartor earned her best finish of fourth in the women's skeleton event both in 2002 and 2006. During the 2006 Winter Olympics, Sartor competed while nine weeks pregnant and missed out on a medal by 0.28 seconds.

Sartor took the 2006-07 Skeleton World Cup off to have her child, but announced on the October 5, 2007 FIBT website that she would return to the World Cup for 2007-08 season though no records showed of her competing that season.

Her best overall seasonal Skeleton World Cup finish was second in the women's event in 2003–4.

Sartor is married to former luger Steffen Skel. The couple has two children: Malin (who Sartor was pregnant with at the 2006 Olympics) and Silas. Since retiring from competition, she has managed a boarding house in Altenberg which was formerly run by her parents. In addition she serves as a member of Sächsische Schweiz-Osterzgebirge district council for the Free Voters. She has also been a winner on the German cooking television programme Die Küchenschlacht.
