= Florian Grassl =

German skeleton racer (born 1980)

Medal record

Men's skeleton

Representing Germany

World Championships
Silver medal – second place	2004 Königssee	Men

Florian Grassl (born 22 April 1980 in Freilassing) is a German skeleton racer who has competed since 2002. He won a silver medal in the men's skeleton event at the 2004 FIBT World Championships in Königssee.

Grassl took part in the 2005/2006 Skeleton World Cup trying to qualify for the 2006 Winter Olympics, but was unable to compete due to injury.
