= Kerstin Szymkowiak =

German skeleton racer (born 1977)

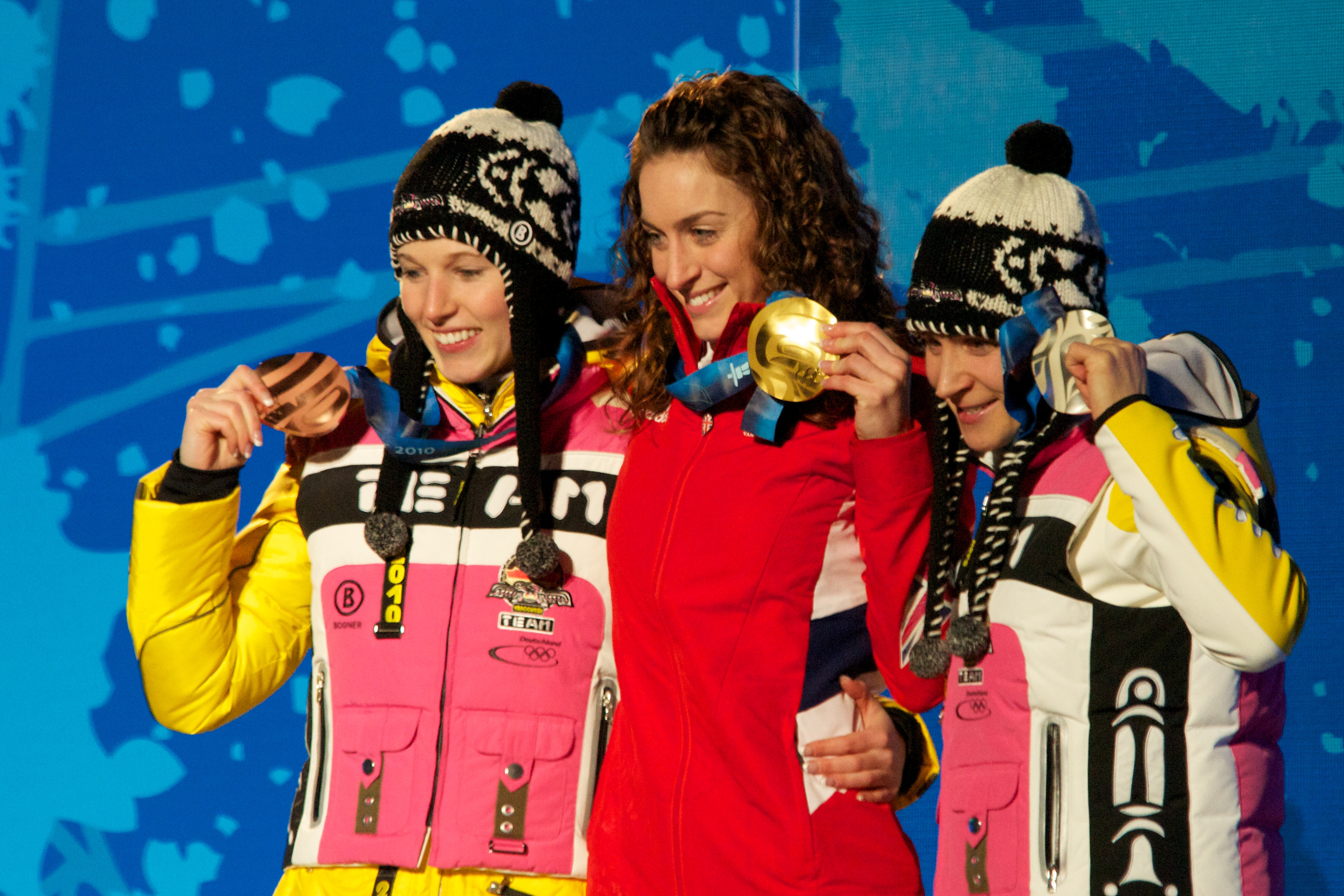
- Szymkowiak (right) at the 2010 Winter Olympics women's skeleton medal ceremony

Personal information
- Born: Kerstin Jürgens; 19 December 1977 (age 48) Siegen, West Germany
- Website: KerstinJuergens.de
Medal record
Women's skeleton
Representing Germany
Olympic Games
Silver medal – second place	2010 Vancouver	Women
World Championships
Bronze medal – third place	2004 Königssee	Women
Bronze medal – third place	2008 Altenberg	Women
Bronze medal – third place	2009 Lake Placid	Women
World Cup Championships
Bronze medal – third place	2009–10	Women
European Championships
Gold medal – first place	2005 Altenberg	Women
Silver medal – second place	2004 Altenberg	Women
Silver medal – second place	2010 Innsbruck	Women
Bronze medal – third place	2008 Cesana	Women

Kerstin Szymkowiak (born Kerstin Jürgens on 19 December 1977 in Siegen) is a German retired skeleton racer who has competed since 2002.

At the FIBT World Championships, she won three bronze medals in the women's skeleton event, earning them in 2004, 2008, and 2009.

Her best overall seasonal finish in the women's Skeleton World Cup title was third in 2004–5.

Jürgens married after the 2007-08 Skeleton World Cup season and has been competing since in the 2008-09 Skeleton World Cup season under her married name. She finished second behind defending world champion Anja Huber of Germany in the season opener at Winterberg on 28 November 2008.

Szymkowiak's nickname is the "Ice Tiger" (Eistiger in German). She earned the silver medal at the 2010 Winter Olympics in Vancouver.

After retiring from the sport Szymkowiak was appointed an Athlete Role Model for the 2012 Winter Youth Olympics in Innsbruck. In May 2012 the Swiss bobsleigh and skeleton federation announced that Szymkowiak had been elected as head of their skeleton section.

Szymkowiak's husband Philippe is a massage therapist for the Swiss national bobsleigh team. She gave birth to a daughter, Noalie, in September 2010.
