= Steffi Jacob =

German skeleton racer (born 1975)

Medal record

Women's Skeleton

Representing Germany

World Championships
Gold medal – first place	2000 Igls	Women

Steffi Jacob (born Steffi Hanzlik; 30 September 1975 in Schmalkalden) is a German skeleton racer who has competed in the early 2000s. She won a gold medal in the inaugural women's skeleton event at the 2000 FIBT World Championships in Igls.

Hanzlik also finished tied for seventh (with Russia's Yekaterina Mironova) at the 2002 Winter Olympics in Salt Lake City.

She also won the women's Skeleton World Cup overall title twice (Inaugural 1996–7, 1998–9).
