= Frank Kleber =

German skeleton racer

Medal record

Men's skeleton

Representing Germany

World Championships
Gold medal – first place	2007 St. Moritz	Mixed team
Bronze medal – third place	2004 Königssee	Men

Frank Kleber (born 11 February 1981 in Gräfelfing) is a German skeleton racer who has competed since 2000. He won two medals at the FIBT World Championships with a gold in 2007 (Mixed team) and a bronze in 2004 (Men's skeleton).

Kleber also finished 11th in the men's skeleton event at the 2002 Winter Olympics in Salt Lake City.

His best overall seasonal Skeleton World Cup finish was third in the men's event in 2003–4.
