= Michi Halilović =

German skeleton racer (born 1983)

Personal information
- Born: 4 September 1983 (age 42) Berchtesgaden, Bavaria, West Germany
Medal record
Men's skeleton
Representing Germany
World Championships
Gold medal – first place	2011 Königssee	Mixed team

Mirsad "Michi" Halilović (born 4 September 1983) is a German skeleton racer of Bosnian origin who has competed since 2001. His first World Cup victory was at a men's event at Altenberg in December 2009. Halilović competed at the 2010 Winter Olympics where he finished 13th.

Mirsad Halilovic most recently competed for WSV Königssee, previously also for RC Berchtesgaden. He was active in the sport since 2000 and was trained by Bernhard Lehmann, Raimund Bethge and Sepp Dossthaler. The police champion aspirant became junior world champion in 2005, in 2006 he missed another medal as fourth. In 2005 he was German Junior Champion, at the German Championships of the same year he was fourth, in 2004 and 2006 he was fifth. In 2008 he won the German Championships for the year 2009 ahead of Florian Grassl and David Lingmann.

Since 2000, Halilovic first competed in the European Cup, finishing third in the 2002/03 season and second overall in 2003/04. He then switched to the World Cup. He achieved his first outstanding result in Winterberg in 2005, finishing fourth, which he improved on in his first season appearances in Cesana in 2007 with a third place and then in Winterberg with a second place behind Alexander Tretyakov. So far, he has achieved top-10 finishes six times. In the 2008-09 season, Halilovic failed to qualify for the World Cup team and then competed in the race series below it, the Skeleton Intercontinental Cup. There he won the first four of the season's eight races, finished second and third once each, and at the end of the season was the superior winner in the overall standings ahead of Chris Type and Alexander Gaszner. Halilovic finished fourth in his only World Cup race in St. Moritz, where he replaced Type, who was competing in the Junior World Championships. At the World Championships in Lake Placid in February 2009, Halilovic finished in 5th place, achieving the best German result at the season's highlight. In the 2009/10 World Cup season he won his first World Cup race in Altenberg. In his first Olympic appearance in Vancouver in 2010, Halilovic finished 13th in the Whistler Sliding Centre. In the 2010-11 season, he posted six top-10 finishes in the World Cup and was sixth overall. He finished ninth at the European Championships in Winterberg and fifth at the World Championships in Koenigssee.

The 2011/12 season began with an accident in which Halilovic tore the discus of his left hand in a training run and severely injured the capsule. This forced him to take a five-week break and he could not take part in the national eliminations for the World Cup, but he was still used in the Intercontinental Cup. There he won seven of the eight organized races in a commanding manner and secured his second overall victory of this series in a superior manner with a lead of almost 200 points over the Canadian Charles Wlodarczak and the Briton Ed Smith. He thus stocked up individual victories in the ICC to a total of eleven.

Halilovic ended his sporting career in 2012. The skeleton world team champion now uses his communication skills as a PR manager in the media industry. He has been speaking for NBCUniversal since 2013.
