= Anja Huber =

German skeleton racer

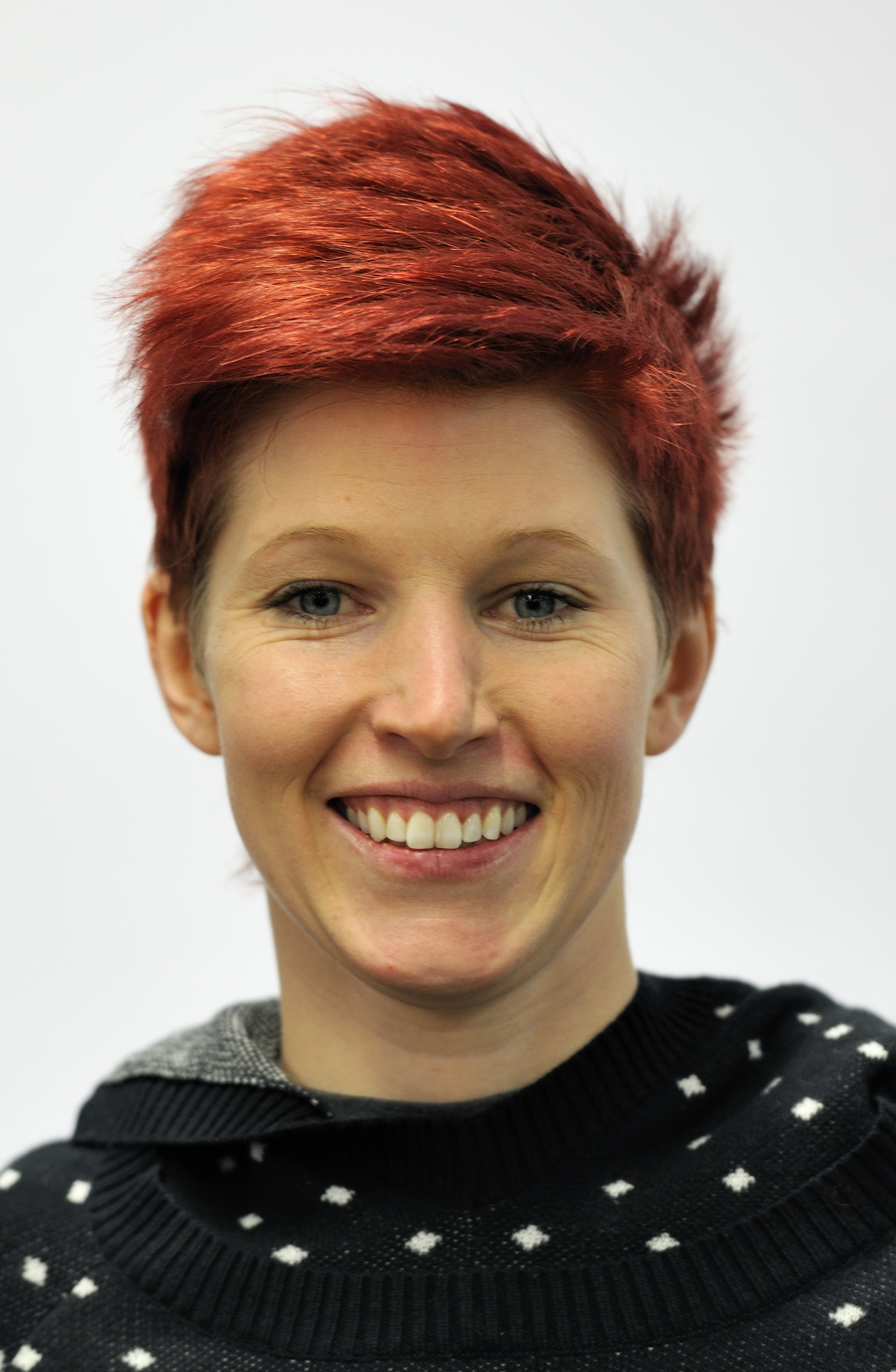

Personal information
- Nationality: German
- Born: 20 May 1983 (age 43) Berchtesgaden, Bavaria, West Germany
- Height: 1.71 m (5 ft 7 in)
- Weight: 63 kg (139 lb)

Sport
- Country: Germany
- Sport: Skeleton
- Event: Women
- Club: RC Berchtesgaden

Achievements and titles
- Olympic finals: 3rd place, bronze medalist(s)
Medal record
Skeleton
Representing Germany
Olympic Games
Bronze medal – third place	2010 Vancouver	Women
World Championships
Gold medal – first place	2008 Altenberg	Women
Gold medal – first place	2008 Altenberg	Mixed team
Silver medal – second place	2011 Königssee	Women
Silver medal – second place	2011 Königssee	Mixed team

Anja Huber (born 20 May 1983 in Berchtesgaden) is a German skeleton racer who has competed since 2003. She earned two gold medals at the 2008 FIBT World Championships in Altenberg, Germany, winning them in women's skeleton and the mixed bobsleigh-skeleton team event.

Huber finished eighth in the women's skeleton event at the 2006 Winter Olympics in Turin and earned a bronze medal at the 2010 Winter Olympics in Vancouver.

Huber won the women's overall Skeleton World Cup in 2010–11 season.
