= Marion Thees =

German skeleton racer

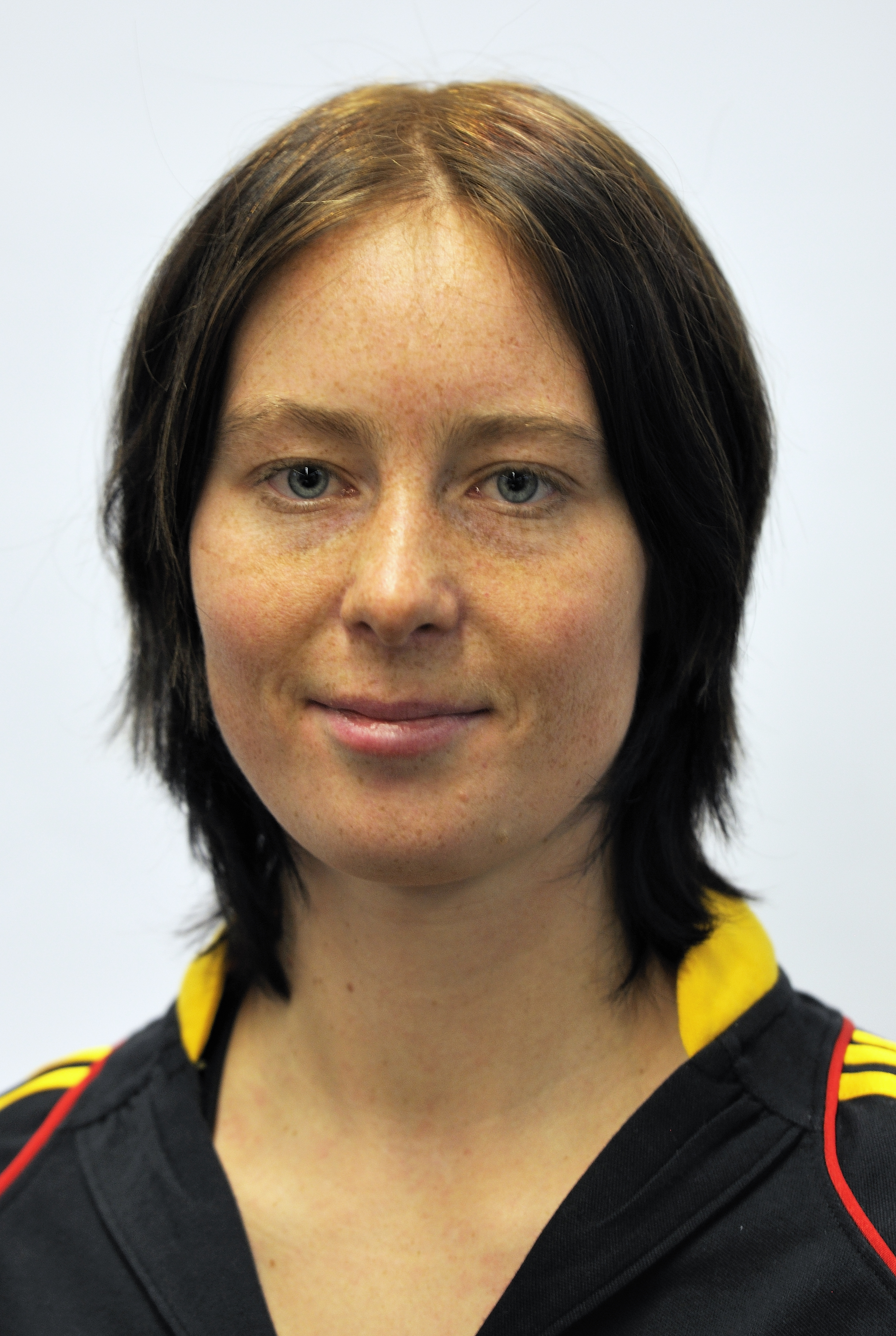

Personal information
- Born: Marion Trott; 5 July 1984 (age 41) Eisenach, East Germany
Medal record
Women's skeleton
Representing Germany
World Championships
Gold medal – first place	2009 Lake Placid	Women
Gold medal – first place	2009 Lake Placid	Mixed team
Gold medal – first place	2011 Königssee	Women
Gold medal – first place	2011 Königssee	Mixed team
Silver medal – second place	2012 Lake Placid	Mixed team
Silver medal – second place	2013 St. Moritz	Mixed team

Marion Thees (born Marion Trott on 5 July 1984 in Eisenach) is a German retired skeleton racer who has competed since 2001. She won two golds at the 2009 FIBT World Championships in Lake Placid, New York, earning them in the women's skeleton and mixed team events.

In 2009, Thees was second in the European Championships in St. Moritz. She won the Skeleton World Cup in 2008–09.

Thees qualified for the 2010 Winter Olympics where she finished eighth.

In September 2014 Thees announced via social media that she was retiring from competition and would be embarking on a career as a coach.
