= Frank Rommel =

German skeleton racer

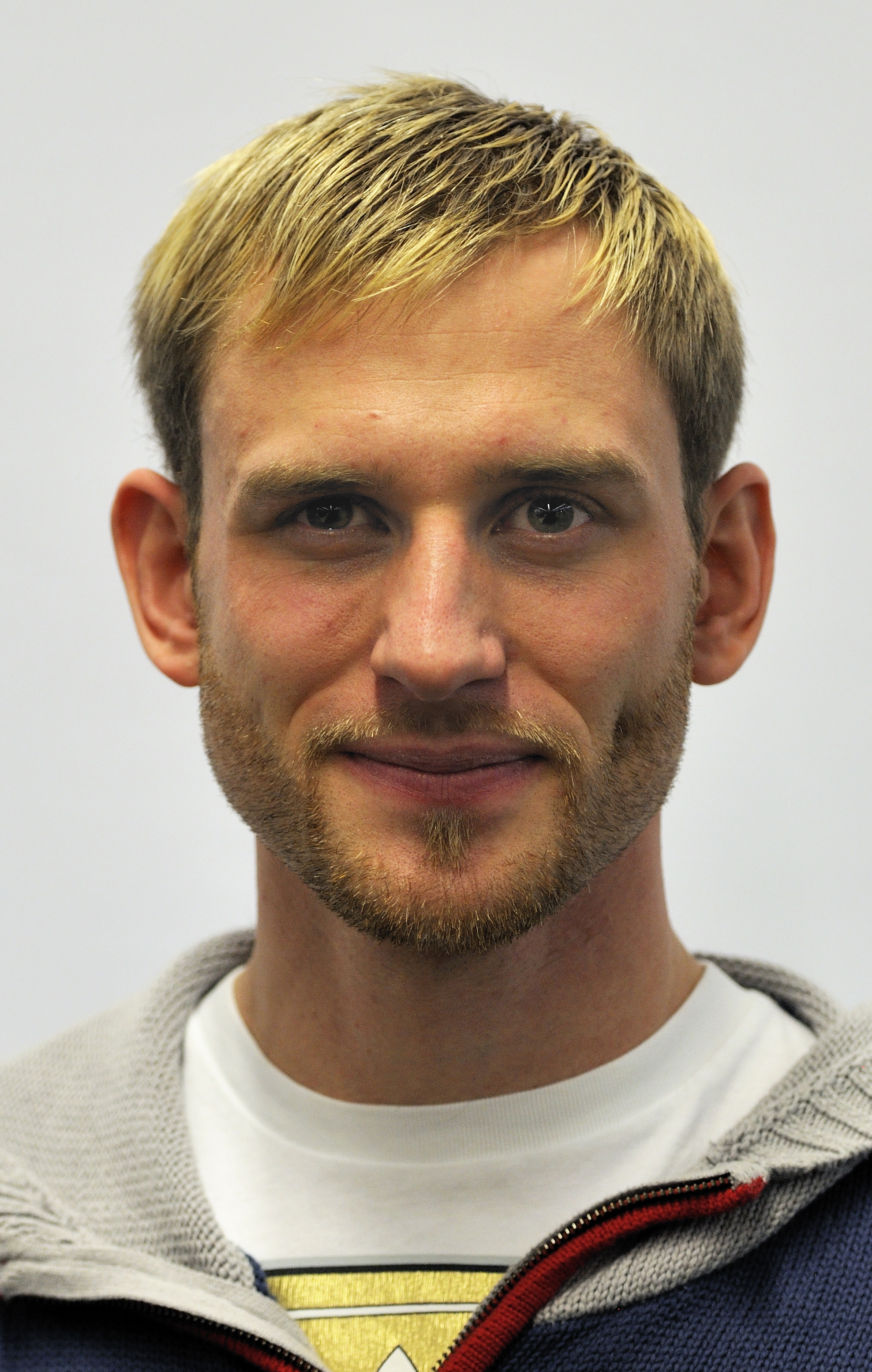

Personal information
- Born: 30 July 1984 (age 41) Suhl, Bezirk Suhl, East Germany
Medal record
Men's skeleton
Representing Germany
World Championships
Gold medal – first place	2009 Lake Placid	Mixed team
Silver medal – second place	2011 Königssee	Mixed team
Silver medal – second place	2012 Lake Placid	Men
Silver medal – second place	2012 Lake Placid	Mixed team
Silver medal – second place	2013 St. Moritz	Mixed team
Bronze medal – third place	2008 Altenberg	Men
Bronze medal – third place	2011 Königssee	Men

Frank Rommel (born 30 July 1984 in Suhl) is a German retired skeleton racer who began competing internationally in 2002. He won two medals at the FIBT World Championships with a gold in the mixed team (2009) and a bronze in the men's skeleton event 2008.

Rommel also finished 24th in the men's skeleton event at the 2006 Winter Olympics in Turin. He qualified for the 2010 Winter Olympics, finishing seventh. Rommel retired from the sport after the 2014 Winter Olympics where he finished 11th.
