= Monique Riekewald =

German skeleton racer

Medal record

Women's skeleton

Representing Germany

World Championships
Gold medal – first place	2007 St. Moritz	Mixed team

Monique Riekewald (born 3 August 1979 in Suhl) is a German skeleton racer who has competed since 1997. She won a gold medal in the mixed bobsleigh-skeleton team event at the 2007 FIBT World Championships in St. Moritz.
