= Julia Eichhorn =

German skeleton racer (born 1983)

Julia Eichhorn (born 11 July 1983) is a German skeleton racer who has competed since 1999. Her best Skeleton World Cup finish was fifth at Königssee in February 2007.

Eichhorn's best finish at the FIBT World Championships was 19th in the women's event at St. Moritz in 2007.
