= IBSF World Championships 2024 – Skeleton mixed team =

Skeleton mixed team at the IBSF World Championships 2024
- Venue: Winterberg bobsleigh, luge, and skeleton track
- Location: Winterberg, Germany
- Dates: 24 February
- Competitors: 36 from 11 nations
- Teams: 18
- Winning time: 1:59.09

Medalists
gold medal	Hannah Neise; Christopher Grotheer	Germany
silver medal	Tabitha Stoecker; Matt Weston	Great Britain
bronze medal	Jacqueline Pfeifer; Axel Jungk	Germany

The Skeleton mixed team competition at the IBSF World Championships 2024 was held on 24 February 2024.

== Results ==
The race was started at 17:04.

Rank	Bib	Country	Athletes	Time	Behind
1st place, gold medalist(s)	18	Germany 1	Hannah Neise; Christopher Grotheer	1:59.09	
2nd place, silver medalist(s)	17	Great Britain 2	Tabitha Stoecker; Matt Weston	1:59.21	+0.12
3rd place, bronze medalist(s)	14	Germany 2	Jacqueline Pfeifer; Axel Jungk	1:59.31	+0.22
4	12	Great Britain 1	Amelia Coltman; Marcus Wyatt	1:59.46	+0.37
5	11	United States	Mystique Ro; Austin Florian	1:59.55	+0.46
6	16	Italy 1	Valentina Margaglio; Amedeo Bagnis	1:59.64	+0.55
7	9	China 2	Li Yuxi; Yan Wengang	2:00.12	+1.03
8	13	Austria 2	Janine Flock; Samuel Maier	2:00.38	+1.29
9	15	China 1	Zhao Dan; Yin Zheng	2:00.39	+1.30
10	7	Canada 1	Jane Channell; Blake Enzie	2:00.54	+1.45
11	10	Italy 2	Alessia Crippa; Mattia Gaspari	2:00.70	+1.61
12	8	Canada 2	Hallie Clarke; Ryan Kuehn	2:01.00	+1.91
13	2	Belgium	Aline Pelckmans; Colin Freeling	2:01.38	+2.29
14	5	Austria 1	Julia Erlacher; Alexander Schlintner	2:01.61	+2.52
15	3	Switzerland 2	Julia Simmchen; Livio Summermatter	2:01.77	+2.68
16	6	Switzerland 1	Sara Schmied; Vinzenz Buff	2:01:83	+2.74
17	4	Czech Republic	Anna Fernstädt; Timon Drahoňovský	2:02:09	+3.00
18	1	Spain	Ana Torres-Quevedo; Adrián Rodríguez	2:04.04	+4.95
