= Skeleton at the 2026 Winter Olympics – Women's =

Skeleton women's at the XXV Olympic Winter Games
- Skeleton
- Venue: Cortina Sliding Centre; Cortina d'Ampezzo
- Date: 13, 14 February 2026
- Competitors: 25 from 17 nations
- Winning time: 3:49.02

Medalists
1st place, gold medalist(s)		Janine Flock	Austria
2nd place, silver medalist(s)		Susanne Kreher	Germany
3rd place, bronze medalist(s)		Jacqueline Pfeifer	Germany

The women's competition in skeleton at the 2026 Winter Olympics was held on 13 February (runs 1 and 2) and 14 February (runs 3 and 4), at the Cortina Sliding Centre in Cortina d'Ampezzo.

Janine Flock won Austria's first gold medal for skeleton during this event. Susanne Kreher of Germany won silver, her first Olympic medal, and Jacqueline Pfeifer (also of Germany) won bronze.

== Background ==
The defending champion, Hannah Neise, qualified for the event, as did the bronze medalist, Kimberley Bos. The silver medalist, Jaclyn Narracott, retired from competitions. Kim Meylemans won the 2025–26 Skeleton World Cup. Bos was the 2025 World champion.

== Results ==
Rank	Bib	Athlete	Country	Run 1	Rank 1	Run 2	Rank 2	Run 3	Rank 3	Run 4	Rank 4	Total	Behind
1st place, gold medalist(s)	1	Janine Flock	Austria	57.22	1	57.26	2	57.26	1	57.28	1	3:49.02	–
2nd place, silver medalist(s)	8	Susanne Kreher	Germany	57.24	2	57.28	3	57.43	2	57.37	3	3:49.32	-0.30
3rd place, bronze medalist(s)	6	Jacqueline Pfeifer	Germany	57.43	4	57.18 TR	1	57.56	4	57.29	2	3:49.46	-0.44
4	10	Hannah Neise	Germany	57.45	5	57.40	4	57.59	5	57.73	6	3:50.17	-1.15
5	3	Tabitha Stoecker	Great Britain	57.40	3	57.61	7	57.75	6	57.72	5	3:50.48	-1.46
6	4	Kim Meylemans	Belgium	57.70	6	57.62	8	57.49	3	57.86	9	3:50.67	-1.65
7	11	Freya Tarbit	Great Britain	57.76	8	57.40	4	57.87	9	57.77	7	3:50.80	-1.78
8	13	Zhao Dan	China	57.70	6	57.47	6	57.83	7	58.21	15	3:51.21	-2.19
9	9	Amelia Coltman	Great Britain	57.86	10	57.73	9	58.13	14	57.60	4	3:51.32	-2.30
10	5	Anna Fernstädt	Czech Republic	57.90	12	57.86	11	57.83	7	57.85	8	3:51.44	-2.42
11	7	Nicole Rocha Silveira	Brazil	57.93	13	57.85	10	58.11	12	57.93	10	3:51.82	-2.80
12	15	Kelly Curtis	United States	57.81	9	57.88	12	58.30	16	58.14	14	3:52.13	-3.11
13	2	Kimberley Bos	Netherlands	57.88	11	57.98	14	58.12	13	58.26	18	3:52.24	-3.22
14	14	Alessandra Fumagalli	Italy	58.02	14	57.93	13	58.22	15	58.11	13	3:52.28	-3.26
15	16	Mystique Ro	United States	58.25	17	58.11	16	57.91	10	58.21	15	3:52.48	-3.46
16	19	Valentina Margaglio	Italy	58.20	16	58.07	15	58.06	11	58.58	19	3:52.91	-3.89
17	21	Marta Andžāne	Latvia	58.37	19	58.15	18	58.32	18	58.09	12	3:52.93	-3.91
18	20	Jane Channell	Canada	58.08	15	58.14	17	58.51	19	58.23	17	3:52.96	-3.94
19	12	Hallie Clarke	Canada	58.51	21	58.22	19	58.31	17	57.98	11	3:53.02	-4.00
20	25	Nanna Johansen	Denmark	58.27	18	58.37	20	58.97	22	58.63	21	3:54.24	-5.22
21	17	Liang Yuxin	China	58.38	20	58.77	23	58.79	21	58.59	20	3:54.53	-5.51
22	18	Hong Su-jung	South Korea	58.88	22	58.45	21	58.73	20	58.67	22	3:54.73	-5.91
23	23	Dārta Zunte	Estonia	58.88	22	58.71	22	59.10	23	58.78	23	3:55.47	-6.45
24	24	Kellie Delka	Puerto Rico	59.40	24	59.17	24	59.52	24	59.22	25	3:57.31	-8.29
25	22	Nicole Burger	South Africa	59.63	25	59.43	25	1:00.06	25	58.98	24	3:58.10	-9.08
