= 2024–25 Skeleton World Cup =

Skeleton championship season

Discipline	Men	Women
Overall	(United Kingdom) Matt Weston (2nd title)	(Austria) Janine Flock (3rd title)

Competition
Edition	39th	29th
Locations	7	7

2024–25 Skeleton World Cup (Earth)

The 2024–25 Skeleton World Cup (official: BMW IBSF Skeleton World Cup) was a multi-race series over a season of skeleton, organised by International Bobsleigh and Skeleton Federation (IBSF). It was the 39th edition for men and 29th edition for women of the highest international race series in skeleton and constitutes the bulk of the elite season in terms of events. The World Cup series consisted of eight events across seven locations.

The season started on 16 November 2024 in Pyeongchang, South Korea and concluded on 7 February 2024 in Lillehammer, Norway. The first three events, two back to back i Pyeongchang and one in Yanqing form the Asian swing, while the final four events form the European swing. No World Series events are held in North America in 2025.

The eighth and final event in Lillehammer included for eligible athletes the 2025 IBSF European Skeleton Championships.

The highlight of the season, the 2025 IBSF Bobsleigh and Skeleton World Championships in Lake Placid, United States, will follow the World cup series, but its results will not be included in the World Cup standings.

== Schedule ==
No.	Location	Date	Details
1	(South Korea) Pyeongchang	16 November 2024	
2	(South Korea) Pyeongchang	17 November 2024	
3	(China) Yanqing	23 November 2024	
4	(Germany) Altenberg	6 December 2024	
5	(Latvia) Sigulda	13 December 2024	
6	(Germany) Winterberg	3 January 2025	
7	(Switzerland) St. Moritz	10 January 2025	
8	(Norway) Lillehammer	7 February 2025	also European Championships
WCH	(United States) Lake Placid	6–8 March 2025	World Championships (Note: Skeleton World Championships are included in the World Cup calendar, but their results do not contribute to the overall World Cup standings.)

== Calendar & Standings ==
=== Men ===
No.	Place	Winner	Time	Second	Time	Third	Time	R.
1	(South Korea) Pyeongchang	(Germany) Christopher Grotheer	1:46.32 (51.85 / 54.47)	(United Kingdom) Marcus Wyatt	1:46.47 (52.02 / 54.45)	(United Kingdom) Matt Weston	1:46.95 (53.12 / 53.83)	
2	(South Korea) Pyeongchang	(Germany) Christopher Grotheer	1:42.81 (51.53 / 51.28)	(United Kingdom) Marcus Wyatt	1:42.87 (51.29 / 51.58)	(United Kingdom) Matt Weston	1:43.31 (51.77 / 51.54)	
3	(China) Yanqing	(Germany) Christopher Grotheer	2:01.93 (1:00.81 / 1:01.12)	(United Kingdom) Matt Weston	2:01.94 (1:00.70 / 1:01.24)	(China) Yin Zheng	2:02.02 (1:00.96 / 1:01.06)	
4	(Germany) Altenberg	(Germany) Christopher Grotheer	1:53.62 (56.70 / 56.92)	(United Kingdom) Matt Weston	1:53.65 (56.83 / 56.82)	(United Kingdom) Marcus Wyatt	1:53.66 (56.88 / 56.78)	
5	(Latvia) Sigulda	(United Kingdom) Marcus Wyatt	1:39.51 (49.59 / 49.92)	(United Kingdom) Matt Weston	1:39.76 (49.79 / 49.97)	(China) Yin Zheng (Austria) Samuel Maier	1:40.44 (50.02 / 50.42); 1:40.44 (50.16 / 50.28)	
6	(Germany) Winterberg	(United Kingdom) Matt Weston	1:53.12 (56.84 / 56.28)	(Austria) Samuel Maier	1:53.70 (56.80 / 56.90)	(Germany) Christopher Grotheer	1:54.00 (56.96 / 57.04)	
7	(Switzerland) St. Moritz	(United Kingdom) Matt Weston	2:14.61 (1:07.39 / 1:07.22)	(Germany) Christopher Grotheer	2:15.15 (1:07.53 / 1:07.60)	(Italy) Amedeo Bagnis	2:15.17 (1:07.54 / 1:07.63)	
8	(Norway) Lillehammer	(China) Lin Qinwei	1:42.69 (51.25 / 51.44)	(Austria) Samuel Maier	1:42.81 (51.28 / 51.52)	(United Kingdom) Marcus Wyatt	1:42.82 (51.39 / 51.43)	
Overall		(United Kingdom) Matt Weston	1640 pts	(United Kingdom) Marcus Wyatt	1557 pts	(Germany) Christopher Grotheer	1462 pts	

==== Overall leaders ====
No.	Holder	Date gained	Place	Date forfeited	Place	Number of competitions
1	(Germany) Christopher Grotheer	16 November 2024	(South Korea) Pyeongchang	13 December 2024	(Latvia) Sigulda	4
2	(United Kingdom) Marcus Wyatt	13 December 2024	(Latvia) Sigulda	3 January 2025	(Germany) Winterberg	1
3	(United Kingdom) Matt Weston	3 January 2025	(Germany) Winterberg	Overall Winner		3

==== Standings ====
Rank	Racer	Points	(South Korea) PYE1	(South Korea) PYE2	(China) YAN	(Germany) ALT	(Latvia) SIG	(Germany) WIN	(Switzerland) STM	(Norway) LIL
1	(United Kingdom) Matt Weston	1640	3	3	2	2	2	1	1	8
2	(United Kingdom) Marcus Wyatt	1557	2	2	4	3	1	8	8	3
3	(Germany) Christopher Grotheer	1462	1	1	1	1	–	3	2	9
4	(Austria) Samuel Maier	1436	6	4	12	10	3	2	6	2
5	(Germany) Axel Jungk	1264	9	16	9	4	10	10	4	4
6	(Germany) Felix Keisinger	1192	9	8	14	9	6	6	18	6
7	(Ukraine) Vladyslav Heraskevych	1184	8	11	8	7	11	4	14	13
8	(China) Chen Wenhao	1184	5	18	7	8	5	17	10	6
9	(China) Yin Zheng	1148	16	14	3	11	3	20	9	5
10	(China) Lin Qinwei	1099	18	7	5	20	21	5	12	1

=== Women ===
No.	Place	Winner	Time	Second	Time	Third	Time	R.
1	(South Korea) Pyeongchang	(United Kingdom) Amelia Coltman	1:48.41 (54.76 / 53.65)	(Austria) Janine Flock	1:48.49 (53.54 / 54.95)	(Brazil) Nicole Silveira	1:48.54 (54.56 / 53.98)	
2	(South Korea) Pyeongchang	(United Kingdom) Freya Tarbit	1:45.64 (52.41 / 52.27)	(Germany) Hannah Neise	1:44.68 (52.87 / 52.77)	(Austria) Janine Flock	1:45.70 (52.54 / 53.16)	
3	(China) Yanqing	(China) Zhao Dan	2:04.27 (1:02.24 / 1:02.03)	(Germany) Hannah Neise	2:04.64 (1:02.40 / 1:02.24)	(United Kingdom) Freya Tarbit	2:04.68 (1:02.24 / 1:02.44)	
4	(Germany) Altenberg	(Belgium) Kim Meylemans	1:01.34	(Germany) Susanne Kreher	1:01.54	(Germany) Hannah Neise	1:01.55	
5	(Latvia) Sigulda	(Netherlands) Kimberley Bos	1:42.81 (51.11 / 51.70)	(Austria) Janine Flock	1:42.97 (51.46 / 51.51)	(Belgium) Kim Meylemans	1:43.13 (51.53 / 51.60)	
6	(Germany) Winterberg	(Austria) Janine Flock	1:56.66 (58.22 / 58.44)	(Czech Republic) Anna Fernstädt	1:56.93 (58.39 / 58.54)	(Germany) Hannah Neise	1:56.95 (58.39 / 51.56)	
7	(Switzerland) St. Moritz	(Austria) Janine Flock	2:18.65 (1:09.56.22 / 1:09.09)	(Belgium) Kim Meylemans	2:18.83 (1:09.62 / 1:09.21)	(Brazil) Nicole Silveira	2:18.92 (1:09.61 / 1:09.31)	
8	(Norway) Lillehammer	(Austria) Janine Flock	1:44.13 (52.05 / 52.08)	(United States) Mystique Ro	1:44.59 (52.38 / 52.21)	(United Kingdom) Amelia Coltman	1:44.98 (52.54 / 52.44)	
Overall		(Austria) Janine Flock	1615 pts	(Netherlands) Kimberley Bos	1465 pts	(Germany) Hannah Neise	1452 pts	

==== Overall leaders ====
No.	Holder	Date gained	Place	Date forfeited	Place	Number of competitions
1	(United Kingdom) Amelia Coltman	16 November 2024	(South Korea) Pyeongchang	17 November 2024	(South Korea) Pyeongchang	1
2	(United Kingdom) Freya Tarbit	17 November 2024	(South Korea) Pyeongchang	6 December 2024	(Germany) Altenberg	2
3	(Germany) Hannah Neise	6 December 2024	(Germany) Altenberg	10 January 2025	(Switzerland) St. Moritz	3
4	(Austria) Janine Flock	10 January 2025	(Switzerland) St. Moritz	Overall Winner		2

==== Standings ====
Rank	Racer	Points	(South Korea) PYE1	(South Korea) PYE2	(China) YAN	(Germany) ALT	(Latvia) SIG	(Germany) WIN	(Switzerland) STM	(Norway) LIL
1	(Austria) Janine Flock	1615	2	3	12	4	2	1	1	1
2	(Netherlands) Kimberley Bos	1465	9	8	6	5	1	4	5	4
3	(Germany) Hannah Neise	1452	6	2	2	3	4	3	14	9
4	(United Kingdom) Amelia Coltman	1291	1	19	14	6	5	5	11	3
5	(Germany) Jacqueline Pfeifer	1288	10	4	5	13	11	6	6	8
6	(Brazil) Nicole Silveira	1192	3	6	–	7	14	8	3	6
7	(United Kingdom) Tabitha Stoecker	1184	5	18	4	10	9	16	4	10
8	(United Kingdom) Freya Tarbit	1159	4	1	3	21	8	13	17	14
9	(Germany) Susanne Kreher	1146	17	15	9	2	6	17	10	5
10	(China) Zhao Dan	1101	5	11	1	17	16	20	8	10

=== Mixed Team ===
No.	Place	Winner	Time	Second	Time	Third	Time	R.
1	(Germany) Altenberg	(United Kingdom) Tabitha Stoecker / Marcus Wyatt	2:01.19 (1:01.62 / 59.57)	(United States) Sara Roderick / Austin Florian	2:01.56 (1:01.92 / 59.64)	(Germany) Susanne Kreher / Christopher Grotheer	2:01.82 (1:01.73 / 1:00.09)	
2	(Germany) Winterberg	(China) Zhao Dan / Lin Qinwei	2:00.87 (1:01.46 / 59.41)	(Austria) Janine Flock / Samuel Maier	2:00.97 (1:01.36 / 59.61)	(China) Li Yuxi / Yin Zheng	2:01.28 (1:01.55 / 59.73)	
3	(Switzerland) St. Moritz	(Germany) Jacqueline Pfeifer / Axel Jungk	2:23.91 (1:12.91 / 1:11.00)	(United States) Mystique Ro / Austin Florian	2:24.04 (1:12.78 / 1:11.25)	(United Kingdom) Amelia Coltman / Matt Weston	2:24.31 (1:13.22 / 1:11.09)	
4	(Norway) Lillehammer	(United Kingdom) Amelia Coltman / Marcus Wyatt	1:50.72 (56.15 / 54.57)	(Austria) Janine Flock / Samuel Maier	1:50.74 (56.00 / 54.47)	(United States) Mystique Ro / Austin Florian	1:51.00 (55.94 / 55.06)	

== Podium table by nation ==
Table showing the World Cup podium places (gold–1st place, silver–2nd place, bronze–3rd place) by the countries represented by the athletes.

Rank	Nation	Gold	Silver	Bronze	Total
1	Great Britain	6	5	5	16
2	Germany	5	4	4	13
3	Austria	2	4	2	8
4	China	2	0	3	5
5	Belgium	1	1	1	3
6	Netherlands	1	0	0	1
7	United States	0	2	0	2
8	Czech Republic	0	1	0	1
9	Brazil	0	0	2	2
10	Italy	0	0	1	1
Totals (10 entries)		17	17	18	52

== Points distribution ==
The table shows the number of points won in the 2024–25 Skeleton World Cup for men and women.

Place	1	2	3	4	5	6	7	8	9	10	11	12	13	14	15	16	17	18	19	20
Points	225	210	200	192	184	176	168	160	152	144	136	128	120	112	104	96	88	80	74	68
