= IBSF World Championships 2025 – Women =

Women at the IBSF World Championships 2025
- Venue: Mt. Van Hoevenberg Olympic Bobsled Run
- Location: Lake Placid, United States
- Dates: 6–7 March
- Competitors: 28 from 16 nations
- Winning time: 3:40.06

Medalists
| gold medal | Kimberley Bos | Netherlands |
| silver medal | Mystique Ro | United States |
| bronze medal | Anna Fernstädt | Czech Republic |

The Women competition at the IBSF World Championships 2025 was held on 6 and 7 March 2025.

== Results ==
The first two runs were started on 6 March at 14:04 and the last two runs on 7 March at 16:00.

| Rank | Bib | Athlete | Country | Run 1 | Rank | Run 2 | Rank | Run 3 | Rank | Run 4 | Rank | Total | Behind |
|---|---|---|---|---|---|---|---|---|---|---|---|---|---|
| 1st place, gold medalist(s) | 2 | Kimberley Bos | Netherlands | 55.63 | 3 | 55.24 | 2 | 54.49 | 1 | 54.70 | 1 | 3:40.06 | |
| 2nd place, silver medalist(s) | 11 | Mystique Ro | United States | 55.53 | 2 | 55.67 | 10 | 54.60 | 3 | 54.93 | 3 | 3:40.73 | +0.67 |
| 3rd place, bronze medalist(s) | 13 | Anna Fernstädt | Czech Republic | 55.69 | 5 | 55.37 | 3 | 54.58 | 2 | 55.17 | 9 | 3:40.81 | +0.75 |
| 4 | 3 | Nicole Silveira | Brazil | 55.76 | 7 | 55.44 | 5 | 54.89 | 6 | 55.14 | 7 | 3:41.23 | +1.17 |
| 5 | 1 | Janine Flock | Austria | 55.82 | 9 | 55.64 | 9 | 55.01 | 8 | 54.91 | 2 | 3:41.38 | +1.32 |
| 6 | 9 | Susanne Kreher | Germany | 56.14 | 13 | 55.46 | 7 | 54.83 | 5 | 54.99 | 5 | 3:41.42 | +1.36 |
| 7 | 14 | Hallie Clarke | Canada | 55.72 | 6 | 55.37 | 3 | 55.03 | 9 | 55.31 | 13 | 3:41.43 | +1.37 |
| 8 | 8 | Tabitha Stoecker | Great Britain | 55.65 | 4 | 56.11 | 17 | 54.78 | 4 | 54.94 | 4 | 3:41.48 | +1.42 |
| 9 | 19 | Li Yuxi | China | 55.80 | 8 | 55.52 | 8 | 54.99 | 7 | 55.28 | 12 | 3:41.59 | +1.53 |
| 10 | 18 | Kelly Curtis | United States | 55.89 | 11 | 55.44 | 5 | 55.09 | 11 | 55.18 | 10 | 3:41.60 | +1.54 |
| 11 | 7 | Kim Meylemans | Belgium | 55.47 | 1 | 55.82 | 13 | 55.08 | 10 | 55.65 | 16 | 3:42.02 | +1.96 |
| 12 | 15 | Jane Channell | Canada | 55.85 | 10 | 55.85 | 14 | 55.34 | 17 | 55.11 | 6 | 3:42.15 | +2.09 |
| 13 | 20 | Katie Uhlaender | United States | 55.90 | 12 | 55.75 | 12 | 55.27 | 16 | 55.53 | 15 | 3:42.45 | +2.39 |
| 14 | 5 | Amelia Coltman | Great Britain | 56.17 | 14 | 55.98 | 15 | 55.22 | 15 | 55.15 | 8 | 3:42.52 | +2.46 |
| 15 | 12 | Zhao Dan | China | 56.19 | 15 | 55.08 | 1 | 55.59 | 20 | 55.69 | 18 | 3:42.55 | +2.49 |
| 16 | 6 | Jacqueline Pfeifer | Germany | 56.44 | 17 | 55.72 | 11 | 55.16 | 14 | 55.41 | 14 | 3:42.73 | +2.67 |
| 17 | 4 | Hannah Neise | Germany | 56.50 | 20 | 56.10 | 16 | 55.10 | 12 | 55.67 | 17 | 3:43.37 | +3.31 |
| 18 | 10 | Freya Tarbit | Great Britain | 56.84 | 23 | 56.30 | 20 | 55.15 | 13 | 55.21 | 11 | 3:43.50 | +3.44 |
| 19 | 21 | Alessia Crippa | Italy | 56.54 | 21 | 56.24 | 18 | 55.40 | 18 | 56.00 | 21 | 3:44.18 | +4.12 |
| 20 | 17 | Valentina Margaglio | Italy | 56.20 | 16 | 56.29 | 19 | 55.55 | 19 | 56.17 | 22 | 3:44.21 | +4.15 |
| 21 | 16 | Julia Erlacher | Austria | 56.46 | 18 | 56.69 | 23 | 56.08 | 23 | 55.78 | 19 | 3:45.01 | +4.95 |
| 22 | 23 | Julia Simmchen | Switzerland | 57.12 | 24 | 56.38 | 21 | 55.86 | 21 | 55.92 | 20 | 3:45.28 | +5.22 |
| 23 | 26 | Aline Pelckmans | Belgium | 56.73 | 22 | 56.53 | 22 | 56.06 | 22 | 56.40 | 24 | 3:45.72 | +5.66 |
| 24 | 24 | Kellie Delka | Puerto Rico | 56.47 | 19 | 56.76 | 24 | 56.68 | 26 | 56.48 | 25 | 3:46.39 | +6.33 |
| 25 | 22 | Sara Schmied | Switzerland | 57.19 | 25 | 56.83 | 25 | 56.18 | 24 | 56.24 | 23 | 3:46.44 | +6.38 |
| 26 | 25 | Laura Vargas | Colombia | 57.46 | 26 | 57.19 | 26 | 57.01 | 27 | Did not advance | | | |
| 27 | 27 | Clara Aznar | Spain | 58.18 | 27 | 57.24 | 27 | 56.49 | 26 | Did not advance | | | |
| 28 | 29 | Shannon Galea | Malta | 59.31 | 28 | 59.21 | 28 | 57.60 | 28 | Did not advance | | | |
| | 28 | Ana Torres-Quevedo | Spain | Did not start | | | | | | | | | |
