= Skeleton at the 2026 Winter Olympics – Mixed team =

Skeleton mixed team at the XXV Olympic Winter Games
- Skeleton
- Venue: Cortina Sliding Centre; Cortina d'Ampezzo
- Date: 15 February 2026
- Competitors: 30 from 10 nations
- Winning time: 1:59.36

Medalists
1st place, gold medalist(s)		Tabitha Stoecker; Matt Weston	Great Britain
2nd place, silver medalist(s)		Susanne Kreher; Axel Jungk	Germany
3rd place, bronze medalist(s)		Jacqueline Pfeifer; Christopher Grotheer	Germany

The mixed team competition in skeleton at the 2026 Winter Olympics was held on 15 February at the Cortina Sliding Centre in Cortina d'Ampezzo. This was the inaugural edition of this event at the Olympics. Tabitha Stoecker and Matt Weston of Great Britain won the event. Susanne Kreher and Axel Jungk of Germany won the silver medal, and their teammates Jacqueline Pfeifer and Christopher Grotheer won bronze. For Stoecker, this was her first Olympic medal and made her the third female skeleton athlete for Great Britain to win an Olympic gold medal after Amy Williams and Lizzy Yarnold, whilst it was the second gold Olympic medal of the Games for Weston having also become champion in the mens' individual event two days earlier. This also made Weston only the second British athlete after Lizzy Yarnold to win two Winter Olympic gold medals and first British Athlete to win multiple gold medals at the same Winter Olympics.

== Background ==
Great Britain I won the 2025–26 Skeleton World Cup, which consisted of four events. It was followed by Germany I and the United States I. The United States 1 (Mystique Ro and Austin Florian) were the 2025 World champion, followed by Great Britain 1 (Tabitha Stoecker and Matt Weston) and China 2 (Zhao Dan and Lin Qinwei).

== Qualification ==
=== Summary ===
Teams qualified	Countries	Athletes total	Nation
2	5	20	China; Germany; Great Britain; Italy; United States
1	5	10	Austria; Canada; Denmark; Latvia; South Korea
15	10	30	

== Results ==
Rank	Bib	Athletes	Country	Women's	Rank	Men's	Rank	Total	Behind
1st place, gold medalist(s)	15	Tabitha Stoecker; Matt Weston	Great Britain	1:00.77	4	58.59	1	1:59.36 TR	—
2nd place, silver medalist(s)	13	Susanne Kreher; Axel Jungk	Germany	1:00.59	3	58.94	2	1:59.53	+0.17
3rd place, bronze medalist(s)	14	Jacqueline Pfeifer; Christopher Grotheer	Germany	1:00.53	2	59.01	4	1:59.54	+0.18
4	12	Freya Tarbit; Marcus Wyatt	Great Britain	1:00.47	1	59.18	6	1:59.65	+0.29
5	10	Zhao Dan; Chen Wenhao	China	1:00.77	4	59.16	5	1:59.93	+0.57
6	9	Alessandra Fumagalli; Amedeo Bagnis	Italy	1:01.06	6	58.98	3	2:00.04	+0.68
7	7	Mystique Ro; Austin Florian	United States	1:01.08	7	59.31	7	2:00.39	+1.03
8	5	Liang Yuxin; Lin Qinwei	China	1:01.27	8	59.39	9	2:00.66	+1.30
9	11	Janine Flock; Samuel Maier	Austria	1:01.66	11	59.35	8	2:01.01	+1.65
10	4	Kelly Curtis; Dan Barefoot	United States	1:01.30	9	1:00.13	14	2:01.43	+2.07
11	8	Hong Su-jung; Jung Seung-gi	South Korea	1:01.84	13	59.61	11	2:01.45	+2.09
12	3	Nanna Johansen; Rasmus Johansen	Denmark	1:02.15	14	59.43	10	2:01.58	+2.22
13	1	Marta Andžāne; Emīls Indriksons	Latvia	1:01.67	12	59.99	13	2:01.66	+2.30
14	6	Valentina Margaglio; Mattia Gaspari	Italy	1:02.24	15	59.72	12	2:01.96	+2.60
15	2	Jane Channell; Josip Brusic	Canada	1:01.57	10	1:01.07	15	2:02.64	+3.28
Official results
