= Tabitha Stoecker =

British skeleton racer (born 2000)

Personal information
- Full name: Tabitha Clare Stoecker
- Nickname: Tabby
- Born: 24 November 2000 (age 25) Highgate, London, England
- Occupations: Skeleton racer; television personality

Sport
- Country: Great Britain
- Sport: Skeleton
Medal record
Skeleton
Representing Great Britain
Olympic Games
Gold medal – first place	2026 Milano Cortina	Mixed team
World Championships
Silver medal – second place	2024 Winterberg	Mixed team
Silver medal – second place	2025 Lake Placid	Mixed team
European Championships
Silver medal – second place	2026 St. Moritz	Women
Skeleton World Cup
Bronze medal – third place	2025-26 Overall	Women

Tabitha Clare Stoecker (born 24 November 2000) is a British skeleton racer. Partnering with Matt Weston, she became an Olympic champion in the inaugural edition of the mixed team event at the 2026 Winter Olympics in Milano-Cortina. She is a two-time IBSF World Championships silver medallist in the same event.

Stoecker joined the British Bobsleigh and Skeleton Association in 2019 and began competing in the Europa Cup in 2021. In both 2022 and 2023, she finished runner-up at the Junior World Championships. In 2023, she became the junior European champion and won her first Skeleton World Cup event. At both the 2024 and 2025 World Championships, she secured silver medals in the mixed team competition alongside Weston. Stoecker placed fifth in the women's skeleton at the 2026 Winter Olympics, before achieving victory in the mixed team event with Weston. In the 2025–26 season, she became a European Championships silver medallist and the overall World Cup bronze medallist in the women's individual competitions. Later that year, she appeared as a contestant on Strictly Come Dancing, and joined the cast of the television series Gladiators.

== Early life ==
Stoecker was born on 24 November 2000 in London. Her father died in a car accident in January 2002 when she was one year old. Her grandparents Michael Davie and Anne Chisholm were journalists. She attended City of London School for Girls, and was a British schools gymnastics champion. Around the age of 11, she attended an open day at the National Centre for Circus Arts in London. For the next six years, she trained in disciplines like the trapeze, clowning and juggling. She later attended university in Cardiff, Wales.

== Career ==
Stoecker joined the British Bobsleigh and Skeleton Association after participating in UK Sport's Discover Your Gold talent identification programme in 2019. When she found out she had been selected for skeleton, Stoecker did not know what the sport was, but decided to try it out. She continued her training in Bath, Somerset, which is home to a push-start track, the only one of its type in the UK. Stoecker made her Europa Cup debut in 2021, and in both 2022 and 2023, she won the silver medal at the IBSF Junior World Championships. Stoecker became the 2023 junior European champion at Igls, Austria. She placed second overall in that season's Europa Cup standings, recording two victories from six events to finish behind compatriot Freya Tarbit. At the 2023 IBSF World Championships, she finished 23rd.

During the 2023–24 Skeleton World Cup, Stoecker won her first World Cup race in her second ever start in the competition. Her win came at La Plagne, France, and marked the first time that a female British slider had won a World Cup event since Laura Deas eight years previously. She finished 0.07 seconds ahead of second-placed Mystique Ro. The following week, she finished third in a subsequent race in the series in Innsbruck, Austria. Stoecker represented Great Britain at the 2024 IBSF World Championships in Winterberg, Germany, placing fourth in the individual event, before winning a silver medal in the mixed team race with Matt Weston. The duo were 0.12 seconds behind the German pairing of Christopher Grotheer and Hannah Neise.

In the 2024–25 World Cup, Stoecker and Marcus Wyatt won the mixed team race in Altenberg, Germany. In March 2025, she competed at the IBSF World Championships in Lake Placid, United States, Stoecker placed eighth in the women's race, but secured a silver medal partnering Weston in the mixed team event; they finished a tenth of a second behind American gold-medal winners Mystique Ro and Austin Florian.

For the 2025–26 World Cup, Stoecker partnered with Wyatt in the mixed team events, and the pair won the first leg of the series in Cortina, Italy. Stoecker also finished fifth in the women's event. She then won a silver medal in the individual competition in Lillehammer, Norway. She and Wyatt then claimed the gold medal with a track record time in the mixed team event at the same venue, before she won an individual silver in Sigulda, Latvia. In January 2026, at the European Championships in St Moritz, Stoecker won the silver medal. With the championships doubling up as a World Cup race, she rose to fourth in the overall standings for the season. Later that month, Stoecker finished in sixth place in the individual event at the final round of the World Cup series in Altenberg. The result helped earn her an overall bronze medal for the series. Her medal was the first overall World Cup medal achieved by a British female slider since Lizzy Yarnold in 2015.

Stoecker was named to Great Britain's squad for the 2026 Winter Olympics in Italy. Competing in the women's skeleton at the Cortina Sliding Centre, she placed fifth after her opening two runs, with a 0.53 seconds deficit to the race leader. Stoecker lost additional time during her third run, but maintained fifth position following her fourth run, finishing 1.46 seconds slower than Austria's Janine Flock who secured gold. She then won gold with Weston in the inaugural mixed team event. Stoecker raced first, before Weston made up three tenths of a second as the British duo finished the event 0.17 seconds ahead of German pairing Axel Jungk and Susanne Kreher. Their combined time of 1:59.36 was a track record for the venue. In May that year, she became the youngest-ever inductee of the University of Bath Hall of Fame for Sport.

== Television appearances ==
In August 2026, it was announced that Stoecker would appear as a contestant on the twenty-fourth series of Strictly Come Dancing. Her professional dance partner on the series was Canadian Mark Karmalita. The following month, she was announced as a new addition to the cast of Gladiators, ahead of its fourth series in 2027.

== Career results ==
=== Olympic Games ===
Year	Event	Position	Ref
Representing Great Britain
(Italy) 2026 Milan Cortina	Women's skeleton	5th	
(Italy) 2026 Milan Cortina	Mixed team	1st place, gold medalist(s)	

=== World Championships ===
Event	Women's Skeleton	Mixed Team	Ref
Representing Great Britain
(Switzerland) 2023 St. Moritz	23rd	N/A	
(Germany) 2024 Winterberg	4th	2nd	
(United States) 2025 Lake Placid	8th	2nd	

=== European Championships ===
Year	Event	Location	Position	Ref
2026	Women's skeleton	(Switzerland) St Moritz	2nd	

=== World Cup victories ===
Year	Event	Location	Teammate	Ref
2023–24	Women's skeleton	(France) La Plagne	N/A	
2024–25	Mixed team	(Germany) Altenberg	Marcus Wyatt	
2025–26	Mixed team	(Italy) Cortina	Marcus Wyatt	
2025–26	Mixed team	(Norway) Lillehammer	Marcus Wyatt	
