= 2025–26 Skeleton World Cup =

Skeleton championship season

Discipline	Men	Women
Overall	(United Kingdom) Matt Weston (3rd title)	(Belgium) Kim Meylemans (1st title)

Competition
Edition	40th	30th
Locations	6	6

The 2025–26 Skeleton World Cup (official: BMW IBSF Skeleton World Cup) was a multi-race series over a season of skeleton, organised by International Bobsleigh and Skeleton Federation (IBSF). It was the 40th edition for men and 30th edition for women of the highest international race series in skeleton and constitutes the bulk of the elite season in terms of events.

The season started on 21 November 2025 in Cortina d'Ampezzo, Italy, the site of the 2026 Winter Olympics and concluded on 16 January 2026 in Altenberg, Germany. Results of the races determined the rankings that decided qualification for Olympic competition.

== Schedule ==
No	Location	Date	Men	Women	Mixed team	Details
1	(Italy) Cortina d'Ampezzo	21 November 2025	●	●	●	
-	(Austria) Innsbruck	28 November 2025	cancelled due to track issues			
2	(Norway) Lillehammer	12 December 2025	●	●	●	
3	(Latvia) Sigulda	18–19 December 2025	●	●	–	
4	(Latvia) Sigulda II	19–20 December 2025	●	●	–	added after Innsbruck cancellation
5	(Germany) Winterberg	2 January 2026	–	●	–	women's only; other events cancelled (weather)
5	(Switzerland) St. Moritz	7 January 2026	●	–	–	added after Winterberg men's cancellation
6	(Switzerland) St. Moritz II	9 January 2026	●	●	●	also European Championships
7	(Germany) Altenberg	16 January 2026	●	●	●	mixed team added after Winterberg canellation
OG	(Italy) Cortina d'Ampezzo	15–22 February 2026	●	●	●	2026 Winter Olympics (not included in the World Cup)

== Men ==
No.	Country	Place	Winner	Time	Second	Time	Third	Time
1	(Italy)	Cortina d’Ampezzo	Matt Weston; Great Britain	1:53.84 (56.89/56.95)	Samuel Maier; Austria	1:53.99 (56.90/57.09)	Yin Zheng; China	1:54.02 (56.79/57.23)
-	(Austria)	Innsbruck	cancelled (track)					
2	(Norway)	Lillehammer	Matt Weston; Great Britain	1:42.58 (51.14/51.44)	Axel Jungk; Germany	1:42.63 (51.28/51.35)	Jung Seung-gi; South Korea	1:42.66 (51.25/51.41)
3	(Latvia)	Sigulda I	Matt Weston; Great Britain	1:40.35 (49.81/50.54)	Marcus Wyatt; Great Britain	1:41.17 (50.71/50.46)	Felix Keisinger; Germany	1:41.20 (50.82/50.38)
4	(Latvia)	Sigulda II	Marcus Wyatt; Great Britain	1:41.37 (50.02/51.35)	Matt Weston; Great Britain	1:41.51 (50.15/51.36)	Yin Zheng; China	1:41.89 (50.98/50.91)
-	(Germany)	Winterberg	cancelled (bad weather)					
5	(Switzerland)	St. Moritz	Matt Weston; Great Britain	2:15.67 (1:08.28/1:07.39)	Amedeo Bagnis; Italy	2:16.96 (1:08.86/1:08.10)	Christopher Grotheer; Germany	2:17.17 (1:09.11/1:08.06)
6	(Switzerland)	St. Moritz II	Matt Weston; Great Britain	2:16.58 (1:08.53/1:08.05)	Amedeo Bagnis; Italy	2:17.49 (1:08.88/1:08.61)	Yin Zheng; China	2:17.56 (1:08.72/1:08.84)
7	(Germany)	Altenberg	Marcus Wyatt; Great Britain	1:50.47 (55.17/55.30)	Matt Weston; Great Britain; Christopher Grotheer; Germany; Axel Jungk; Germany	1:50.65	not awarded	
Overall			Matt Weston; Great Britain : 1545 points		Yin Zheng; China : 1328 points		Marcus Wyatt; Great Britain : 1276 points	

=== Overall Standings ===
Final standings; top ten only:

Rank	Racer	Nation	Points	(Italy) COR	(Austria) INN	(Norway) LIL	(Latvia) SIG I	(Latvia) SIG II	(Germany) WIN	(Switzerland) STM I	(Switzerland) STM II	(Germany) ALT
1st place, gold medalist(s)	Matt Weston	Great Britain	1545	1	cancelled	1	1	2	cancelled	1	1	=2
2nd place, silver medalist(s)	Yin Zheng	China	1328	3	cancelled	6	4	3	cancelled	4	3	7
3rd place, bronze medalist(s)	Marcus Wyatt	Great Britain	1276	12	cancelled	7	2	1	cancelled	7	9	1
4	Axel Jungk	Germany	1252	6	cancelled	2	7	9	cancelled	6	8	=2
5	Samuel Maier	Austria	1098	2	cancelled	4	8	18	cancelled	8	11	8
6	Jung Seung-gi	South Korea	1080	5	cancelled	3	9	6	cancelled	5	5	-
6	Chen Wenhao	China	1080	8	cancelled	8	13	7	cancelled	14	6	5
8	Amedeo Bagnis	Italy	1078	19	cancelled	12	6	4	cancelled	2	2	17
9	Christopher Grotheer	Germany	1048	15	cancelled	21	16	5	cancelled	3	4	=2
10	Felix Keisinger	Germany	1008	13	cancelled	10	3	15	cancelled	16	7	6

== Women ==
No.	Country	Place	Winner	Time	Second	Time	Third	Time
1	(Italy)	Cortina d’Ampezzo	Jacqueline Pfeifer; Germany	1:55.93 (57.99/57.64)	Hannah Neise; Germany	1:56.16 (58.07/58.09)	Kim Meylemans; Belgium	1:56.25 (58.23/58.02)
-	(Austria)	Innsbruck	cancelled (track)					
2	(Norway)	Lillehammer	Janine Flock; Austria	1:44.31 (52.09/52.22)	Tabitha Stoecker; Great Britain	1:44.49 (52.26/52.23)	Kim Meylemans; Belgium	1:44.56 (52.31/52.25)
3	(Latvia)	Sigulda I	Kim Meylemans; Belgium	1:43.90 (51.97/51.93)	Tabitha Stoecker; Great Britain	1:44.24 (51.82/52.42)	Janine Flock; Austria	1:44.29 (51.96/52.33)
4	(Latvia)	Sigulda II	Kim Meylemans; Belgium	1:44.16 (51.80/52.36)	Anna Fernstädt; Czech Republic	1:44.24 (51.73/52.51)	Amelia Coltman; Great Britain	1:44.30 (51.87/52.43)
5	(Germany)	Winterberg	Janine Flock; Austria	2:00.22 (1:00.38/59.84)	Mystique Ro; United States	2:00.60 (1:00.34/1:00.26)	Anna Fernstädt; Czech Republic	2:00.83 (1:00.85/59.98)
6	(Switzerland)	St. Moritz	Kim Meylemans; Belgium	2:21.01 (1:10.78/1:10.23)	Kelly Curtis; United States	2:22.12 (1:11.44/1:10.68)	Nicole Silveira; Brazil	2:22.18 (1:11.38/1:10.80)
7	(Germany)	Altenberg	Jacqueline Pfeifer; Germany	1:54.42 (57.36/57.06)	Susanne Kreher; Germany	1:54.75 (57.43/57.32)	Kim Meylemans; Belgium	1:54.76 (57.39/57.37)
Overall			Kim Meylemans; Belgium : 1443 points		Jacqueline Pfeifer; Germany : 1338 points		Tabitha Stoecker; Great Britain : 1236 points	

=== Overall Standings ===
Final standings; top ten only:

Rank	Racer	Nation	Points	(Italy) COR	(Austria) INN	(Norway) LIL	(Latvia) SIG I	(Latvia) SIG II	(Germany) WIN	(Switzerland) STM	(Germany) ALT
1st place, gold medalist(s)	Kim Meylemans	Belgium	1443	3	cancelled	3	1	1	7	1	3
2nd place, silver medalist(s)	Jacqueline Pfeifer	Germany	1338	1	cancelled	4	8	7	5	5	1
3rd place, bronze medalist(s)	Tabitha Stoecker	Great Britain	1236	5	cancelled	2	2	15	8	4	6
4	Anna Fernstädt	Czechia	1162	7	cancelled	10	4	2	3	18	7
5	Janine Flock	Austria	1102	4	cancelled	1	3	4	1	20	-
6	Susanne Kreher	Germany	1082	12	cancelled	12	7	10	12	6	2
7	Hannah Neise	Germany	1042	2	cancelled	9	6	5	19	21	5
8	Kimberley Bos	Netherlands	1037	11	cancelled	7	5	8	24	9	4
9	Nicole Rocha Silveira	Brazil	944	16	cancelled	17	12	11	8	3	11
10	Amelia Coltman	Great Britain	944	10	cancelled	14	11	3	18	10	12

== Mixed team ==
No.	Country	Place	Winner	Time	Second	Time	Third	Time
1	(Italy)	Cortina d’Ampezzo	Great Britain 1 Tabitha Stoecker; Marcus Wyatt	2:01.23 (1:01.31/59.92)	Germany 1 Jacqueline Pfeifer; Axel Jungk	2:01.28 (1:01.45/59.83)	Austria 1 Janine Flock; Samuel Maier	2:01.43 (1:01.39/1:00.04)
-	(Austria)	Innsbruck	cancelled (track)					
2	(Norway)	Lillehammer	Great Britain 1 Tabitha Stoecker; Marcus Wyatt	1:49.33 (55.26/54.07)	United States 1 Mystique Ro; Austin Florian	1:49.89 (55.61/54.28)	Germany 1 Jacqueline Pfeifer; Axel Jungk	1:49.91 (55.72/54.19)
-	(Germany)	Winterberg	cancelled (bad weather)					
3	(Switzerland)	St. Moritz	China 1 Dan Zhao; Zheng Yin	2:26.16	Germany 2 Susanne Kreher; Axel Jungk	2:26.25	Italy 1 Alessandra Fumagalli; Amedeo Bagnis	2:26.45
4	(Germany)	Altenberg (Note: Race added after Winterberg cancellation)	Germany 2 Susanne Kreher; Axel Jungk	1:58.21	Great Britain 2 Amelia Coltman; Matt Weston	1:58.56	Germany 1 Jacqueline Pfeifer; Christopher Grotheer	1:58.91
Overall			Great Britain 1 : 818 points		Germany 1 : 778 points		United States 1 : 768 points	

=== Overall Standings ===
Final standings; top ten only:

Rank	Team	Points	(Italy) COR	(Austria) INN	(Norway) LIL	(Germany) WIN	(Switzerland) STM	(Germany) ALT
1st place, gold medalist(s)	Great Britain I	818	225	cancelled	225	cancelled	184	184
2nd place, silver medalist(s)	Germany I	778	210	cancelled	200	cancelled	168	200
3rd place, bronze medalist(s)	USA I	768	184	cancelled	210	cancelled	184	190
4	Germany II	755	192	cancelled	128	cancelled	210	225
5	Great Britain II	738	144	cancelled	192	cancelled	192	210
6	Italy I	728	176	cancelled	184	cancelled	200	168
7	China I	705	128	cancelled	176	cancelled	225	176
8	Austria I	600	200	cancelled	112	cancelled	144	144
9	China II	592	152	cancelled	152	cancelled	152	136
10	Italy II	496	160	cancelled	-	cancelled	168	168

== Medal tables ==
=== Overall World Cup ===
Table showing overall event medalists:

Rank	Nation	Gold	Silver	Bronze	Total
1	Great Britain	2	0	2	4
2	Belgium	1	0	0	1
3	Germany	0	2	0	2
4	China	0	1	0	1
5	United States	0	0	1	1
Totals (5 entries)		3	3	3	9

=== Podium table by nation ===
Table showing the total World Cup podium places (gold–1st place, silver–2nd place, bronze–3rd place) by the countries represented by the athletes in all 18 World Cup races:

Rank	Nation	Gold	Silver	Bronze	Total
1	Great Britain	9	6	1	16
2	Germany	3	7	4	14
3	Belgium	3	0	3	6
4	Austria	2	1	2	5
5	China	1	0	3	4
6	United States	0	3	0	3
7	Italy	0	2	1	3
8	Czech Republic	0	1	1	2
9	Brazil	0	0	1	1
9	South Korea	0	0	1	1
Totals (10 entries)		18	20	17	55

== See also ==
- 2025–26 Bobsleigh World Cup
