= IBSF World Championships 2025 – Men =

Men at the IBSF World Championships 2025
- Venue: Mt. Van Hoevenberg Olympic Bobsled Run
- Location: Lake Placid, United States
- Dates: 6–7 March
- Competitors: 29 from 17 nations
- Winning time: 3:35.48

Medalists
gold medal	Matt Weston	Great Britain
silver medal	Marcus Wyatt	Great Britain
bronze medal	Axel Jungk	Germany

The Men competition at the IBSF World Championships 2025 was held on 6 and 7 March 2025.

== Results ==
The first two runs were started on 6 March at 09:34 and the last two runs on 7 March at 10:45

Rank	Bib	Athlete	Country	Run 1	Rank	Run 2	Rank	Run 3	Rank	Run 4	Rank	Total	Behind
1st place, gold medalist(s)	1	Matt Weston	Great Britain	53.83	1	55.19	1	52.80	1	53.66	4	3:35.48	
2nd place, silver medalist(s)	3	Marcus Wyatt	Great Britain	54.27	2	55.64	3	53.59	6	53.88	9	3:37.38	+1.90
3rd place, bronze medalist(s)	5	Axel Jungk	Germany	54.27	2	55.76	5	53.44	5	53.94	12	3:37.41	+1.93
4	8	Vladyslav Heraskevych	Ukraine	54.59	6	55.91	8	53.38	4	53.61	2	3:37.49	+2.01
5	7	Yin Zheng	China	54.71	9	55.69	4	53.28	2	53.92	10	3:37.60	+2.12
6	12	Austin Florian	United States	54.72	10	55.77	6	53.29	3	53.87	8	3:37.65	+2.17
7	2	Christopher Grotheer	Germany	54.44	4	55.61	2	53.72	11	53.93	11	3:37.70	+2.22
8	6	Chen Wenhao	China	54.45	5	55.99	9	53.61	7	53.84	7	3:37.89	+2.41
9	10	Lin Qinwei	China	54.93	12	55.82	7	53.74	12	53.52	1	3:38.01	+2.53
10	14	Amedeo Bagnis	Italy	54.59	6	56.32	18	53.97	15	53.64	3	3:38.52	+3.04
11	19	Daniel Barefoot	United States	55.19	14	56.19	16	53.61	7	53.83	6	3:38.82	+3.34
12	17	Alexander Schlintner	Austria	54.92	11	56.00	10	54.01	17	54.24	15	3:39.17	+3.69
13	15	Kim Ji-soo	South Korea	54.69	8	56.05	13	53.80	13	54.65	23	3:39.19	+3.71
14	9	Felix Keisinger	Germany	55.16	13	56.03	11	53.99	16	54.02	13	3:39.20	+3.72
15	4	Samuel Maier	Austria	55.33	16	56.51	24	53.90	14	53.75	5	3:39.49	+4.01
16	11	Rasmus Johansen	Denmark	55.64	21	56.06	14	53.65	9	54.45	21	3:39.80	+4.32
17	16	Laurence Bostock	Great Britain	55.20	15	56.38	21	54.10	18	54.13	14	3:39.81	+4.33
18	13	Mattia Gaspari	Italy	55.34	17	56.15	15	53.70	10	54.63	22	3:39.82	+4.34
19	18	Vinzenz Buff	Switzerland	55.45	20	56.04	12	54.43	24	54.35	18	3:40.27	+4.79
20	20	Nicholas Timmings	Australia	55.44	18	56.40	22	54.12	19	54.35	18	3:40.31	+4.83
21	22	Yaroslav Lavreniuk	Ukraine	55.64	21	56.36	20	54.33	22	54.26	16	3:40.59	+5.11
22	29	Jung Seung-gi	South Korea	55.44	18	56.88	25	54.12	19	54.32	17	3:40.76	+5.28
23	26	Adrián Rodríguez	Spain	55.88	24	56.23	17	54.30	21	54.43	20	3:40.84	+5.36
24	25	Colin Freeling	Belgium	55.71	23	56.46	23	54.84	25	54.84	24	3:41.85	+6.37
25	23	Jared Firestone	Israel	55.94	25	56.33	19	55.13	27	54.99	25	3:42.39	+6.91
26	21	Livio Summermatter	Switzerland	56.09	26	57.40	27	54.42	23	Did not advance			
27	28	Akwasi Frimpong	Ghana	56.19	27	57.97	28	55.33	28	Did not advance			
28	27	Timon Drahoňovský	Czech Republic	56.85	29	57.01	26	55.88	29	Did not advance			
29	24	Jonathan Yaw	Malaysia	56.36	28	58.63	29	54.97	26	Did not advance			
