= Skeleton at the 2026 Winter Olympics =

Skeleton at the XXV Olympic Winter Games
- Skeleton pictogram
- Venue: Cortina Sliding Centre
- Dates: 12–15 February 2026
- No. of events: 3 (1 men, 1 women, 1 mixed)
- Competitors: 50 from 22 nations

Skeleton at the 2026 Winter Olympics was held at the Cortina Sliding Centre in Cortina d'Ampezzo, Italy. The events took place between 12 and 15 February 2026. A total of three skeleton events were held.

For the first time, a skeleton mixed team event was contested, along with the individual events for men and women.

== Competition schedule ==
The following is the competition schedule for the three skeleton events.

All times are (UTC+1).

Date	Time	Event
12 February	09:30	Men's singles runs 1 and 2
13 February	16:00	Women's singles runs 1 and 2
13 February	19:30	Men's singles runs 3 and 4
14 February	18:00	Women's singles runs 3 and 4
15 February	18:00	Mixed team

== Medal summary ==
=== Medal table ===
Rank	Nation	Gold	Silver	Bronze	Total
1	Great Britain	2	0	0	2
2	Austria	1	0	0	1
3	Germany	0	3	3	6
Totals (3 entries)		3	3	3	9

=== Medalists ===
Event	Gold		Silver		Bronze	
Men's	Matt Weston; Great Britain	3:43.33	Axel Jungk; Germany	3:44.21	Christopher Grotheer; Germany	3:44.40
Women's	Janine Flock; Austria	3:49.02	Susanne Kreher; Germany	3:49.32	Jacqueline Pfeifer; Germany	3:49.46
Mixed team	Great Britain; Tabitha Stoecker; Matt Weston	1:59.36	Germany; Susanne Kreher; Axel Jungk	1:59.53	Germany; Jacqueline Pfeifer; Christopher Grotheer	1:59.54

== Participating nations ==
A total of 50 athletes from 22 nations qualified to participate. Denmark and Estonia made their Olympic sport debuts. The only Ukrainian athlete was disqualified before the start.

- Australia (1)
- Austria (3)
- Belgium (1)
- Brazil (1)
- Canada (3)
- China (5)
- Czech Republic (1)
- Denmark (2)
- Estonia (1)
- France (1)
- Germany (6)
- Great Britain (5)
- Israel (1)
- Italy (4)
- Japan (1)
- Latvia (2)
- Netherlands (1)
- Puerto Rico (1)
- South Africa (1)
- South Korea (3)
- Switzerland (1)
- Ukraine (1)
- United States (4)
