= Freya Tarbit =

British skeleton racer (born 2000)

Personal information
- Nationality: British
- Born: 24 August 2000 (age 25) Derby, Derbyshire, England
- Height: 178 cm (5 ft 10 in)

Sport
- Country: Great Britain
- Sport: Skeleton
- Turned pro: 2023
Medal record
Women's skeleton
Representing Great Britain
European Championships
Bronze medal – third place	2026 St. Moritz	Mixed team

Freya Tarbit (born 24 August 2000) is a British skeleton racer. She was a Junior World Championship bronze medalist in 2023, and a mixed team bronze medalist at the IBSF European Championships 2026. She was selected to compete for Great Britain at the 2026 Winter Olympics.

== Career ==
Freya Tarbit is from Ockbrook, Derbyshire, Tarbit competed as a long jumper prior to focussing on winter sports via the Discover Your Gold UK Sport talent ID campaign. She had first shown interest in the sport at the age of 14 years-old, when she applied for a taster session with the BBSA (British Bobsleigh and Skeleton Association).

Tarbit made her international debut in February 2021 when she placed fifth overall in the skeleton at the Europa Cup and European Championship race in Igls. The following year she was tenth overall at the 2022 Junior Worlds Championships in Igls.

Tarbit won the Junior World Championship bronze medal in Winterberg in 2023, behind compatriot Tabitha Stoecker in silver. She then won the overall women's skeleton title at the IBSF Europa Cup in February 2023, and the Junior European Championship silver medal behind Stoecker.

Stepping up to the senior level, competing in the 2024–25 Skeleton World Cup season Tarbit finished eighth overall. She claimed her maiden World Cup win in Pyeongchang in November 2024 in her eleventh World Cup race, finishing 0.96 secs clear of Olympic champion Hannah Neise of Germany. That month, she also finished third overall in the World Cup event in Yangqing.

In the 2025-26 World Cup season, Tarbit had top-six finishes in Winterberg, Lillehammer and Sigulda. She won the bronze medal in the mixed team event at the 2026 European Championships in St. Moritz, alongside Jacob Salisbury, finishing ahead of fellow British competitors Marcus Wyatt and Amelia Coltman by one-hundredth of a second.

Tarbit was selected to compete for Great Britain at the 2026 Winter Olympics in Italy, where she finished seventh in the women's skeleton. She then partnered Marcus Wyatt in the mixed team competition where the duo finished in fourth place, 0.01 seconds behind the bronze-medal position.

== Career results ==
All results are sourced from the International Bobsleigh and Skeleton Federation (IBSF).

=== Olympic Games ===
Year	Event	Position	Ref
Representing Great Britain
(Italy) 2026 Milan Cortina	Women's skeleton	7th	
(Italy) 2026 Milan Cortina	Mixed team	4th	

=== World Championships ===
Event	Women	Skeleton mixed team
(United States) 2025 Lake Placid	18th	N/A

=== World Cup results ===
Season	1	2	3	4	5	6	7	8	Points	Place
2022–23	—	—	—	7	—	—	—	—	168	26th
2023–24	–	14	21	28	16	10	20	15	614	20th
2024–25	4	1	3	21	8	13	17	14	1159	8th
2025–26	17	5	25	6	6	12	9	—N/a	944	11th
