= Marcus Wyatt (skeleton racer) =

British skeleton racer (born 1991)

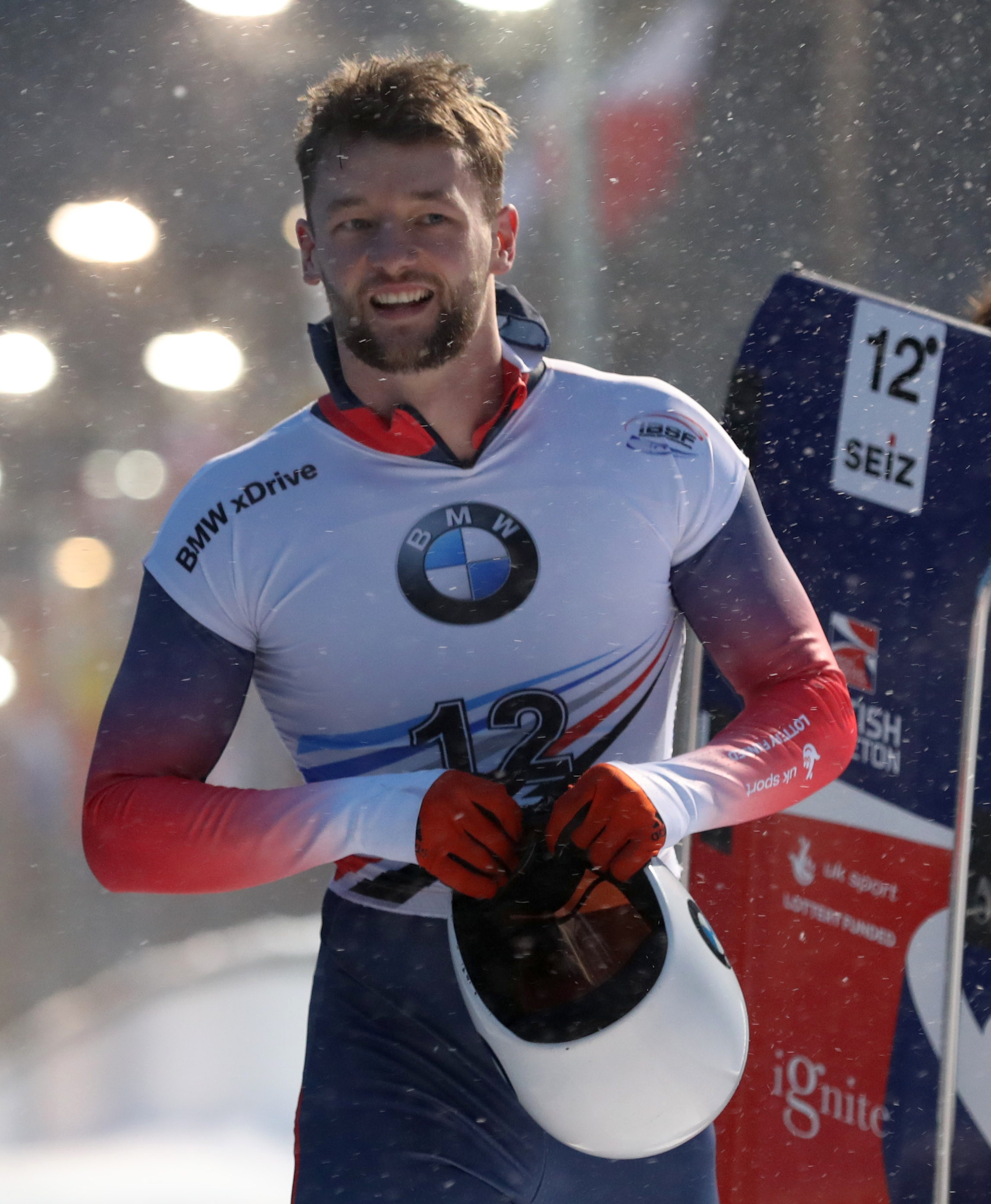
- Wyatt in 2019

Personal information
- Full name: Marcus Kieran Wyatt
- Nationality: British
- Born: 14 December 1991 (age 34) Honiton, Devon, Great Britain
- Height: 1.83 m (6 ft 0 in)
- Weight: 90 kg (198 lb)
- Spouse: Imogen Wyatt (m. 2024)

Sport
- Sport: Skeleton
Medal record
Men's skeleton
Representing Great Britain
World Championships
Silver medal – second place	2025 Lake Placid	Men
European Championships
Gold medal – first place	2024 Sigulda	Men
Silver medal – second place	2025 Lillehammer	Men

Marcus Wyatt (born 14 December 1991) is a British skeleton racer. He won the 2024 IBSF European Championships, and finished runner-up at the 2025 World Championships.

== Early life ==
Wyatt grew up in Honiton. He earned a degree in psychology from the University of Swansea. While at university, he competed for the school's gridiron football team, the Swansea Titans.

== Career ==
Wyatt first took up skeleton after the 2014 Winter Olympics when he participated in a talent identification programme called Power2Podium. He made his competitive debut at the North American Cup in March 2016, finishing fifth, and the following year made his World Cup debut in Igls, finishing tenth. He won a second-tier Intercontinental title at Igls in November 2018, and that year he travelled to the 2018 Winter Olympics as an observer - part of the British Olympic Associations Ambitions programme.

Wyatt finished in sixth position in the overall standings of the 2018–19 Skeleton World Cup. For the 2019–20 Skeleton World Cup, Wyatt finished in eighth place in the final standings.

In November 2020, during the 2020–21 Skeleton World Cup season, Wyatt finished third in the race in Sigulda, Latvia. It was the first time that a British male skeleton racer had recorded a World Cup podium finish since Dom Parsons' bronze medal at Calgary in 2013.

Wyatt finished in 16th position in his Olympics debut in 2022. In November that year, Wyatt claimed his first ever World Cup gold medal after achieving victory in Whistler. In the 2022–23 World Cup, Wyatt won a silver medal in Sigulda and ended the competition in overall third position.

In the 2023–24 World Cup, Wyatt won a silver medal in Lake Placid and finished the series in overall fifth position. At the 2024 World Championships, Wyatt set a new track record but ended up missing out on a medal by 0.01 seconds. In February 2024, he became European champion in Sigulda. He finished 0.16 seconds ahead of international teammate Matt Weston.

In the 2024–25 World Cup, Wyatt won back-to-back silver medals in Pyeongchang. He later won bronze medals at subsequent meetings in the competition at Altenberg and Lillehammer and ended the World Cup in overall second place behind Weston. In the mixed team event, Wyatt won the meeting in Altenberg with teammate Tabitha Stoecker, and the event in Lillehammer with Amelia Coltman. He then won a silver medal at the 2025 World Championships after finishing 1.9 seconds behind Matt Weston.

In December 2025, Wyatt won the 2025–26 World Cup event in Sigulda. In the mixed team event, Wyatt, racing with Tabitha Stoecker, won back-to-back World Cup events in Cortina and Lillehammer. At the final event of the series in Altenberg, Wyatt claimed victory in the individual event to help him finish the World Cup series in overall third position. In February, Wyatt competed in the men's skeleton at the 2026 Winter Olympics and finished in ninth position. He then partnered Freya Tarbit in the mixed team competition where the duo finished in fourth place, 0.01 seconds behind the bronze-medal position.

== Career results ==
=== Olympic Games ===
Event	Men's Skeleton	Mixed team
Representing Great Britain
(China) 2022 Beijing	16th	
(Italy) 2026 Milano-Cortina	9th	4th

=== World Championships ===
Event	Men's skeleton	Mixed team
Representing Great Britain
(Canada) 2019 Whistler	12th	—N/a
(Germany) 2020 Altenberg	10th	—N/a
(Germany) 2021 Altenberg	12th	—N/a
(Switzerland) 2023 St. Moritz	5th	—N/a
(Germany) 2024 Winterberg	4th	4th
(United States) 2025 Lake Placid	2nd	DSQ

=== Skeleton World Cup ===
Season	Place	Points	1	2	3	4	5	6	7	8
2017–18	22nd	452	LPL1 –	PAC –	WHI –	WIN –	IGL; 10	ALT; 14	STM; 20	KON; 12
2018–19	6th	1288	SIG; 12	WIN; 10	ALT; 8	IGL; 6	STM; 7	LPL; 7	CGR1; 8	CGR2; 5
2019–20	8th	1184	LPL1; 10	LPL2; 8	WIN; 8	LPG; 14	IGL; 4	KON; 13	STM; 11	SIG; 8
2020–21	8th	1008	SIG1; 8	SIG2; 3	IGL1 –	IGL2 –	WIN; 13	STM; 8	KON; 5	IGL3; 5
2021–22	19th	638	IGL1; 14	IGL2; 10	ALT1; 14	WIN1; 25	ALT2; 19	SIG; 17	WIN2 –	STM; 20
2022–23	3rd	1531	WHI; 1	PAR; 3	LPL; 4	WIN; 4	ALT1; 6	ALT2; 5	IGL; 9	SIG; 2
2023–24	5th	1254	YAN; 7	LPG; 3	IGL; 9	STM; 12	LIL; 31	SIG; 2	ALT; 7	LKP; 2
2024–25	2nd	1557	PYE1; 2	PYE2; 2	YAN; 4	ALT; 3	SIG; 1	WIN; 8	STM; 8	LIL; 3
