= Marta Andžāne =

Latvian skeleton racer (born 2008)

Personal information
- Born: 28 January 2008 (age 18) Valmiera, Latvia
- Height: 171 cm (5 ft 7 in)
- Weight: 62 kg (137 lb; 9 st 11 lb)

Sport
- Country: Latvia
- Sport: Skeleton

Marta Andžāne (born 28 January 2008) is a Latvian skeleton racer. She competed at the 2026 Winter Olympics in the individual and, alongside Emīls Indriksons, mixed team skeleton events where she placed 17th and 13th overall.

She also competed at the 2024 Winter Youth Olympics in the individual competition, where she placed 5th.
