= Kim Meylemans =

German-Belgian skeleton racer (born 1996)

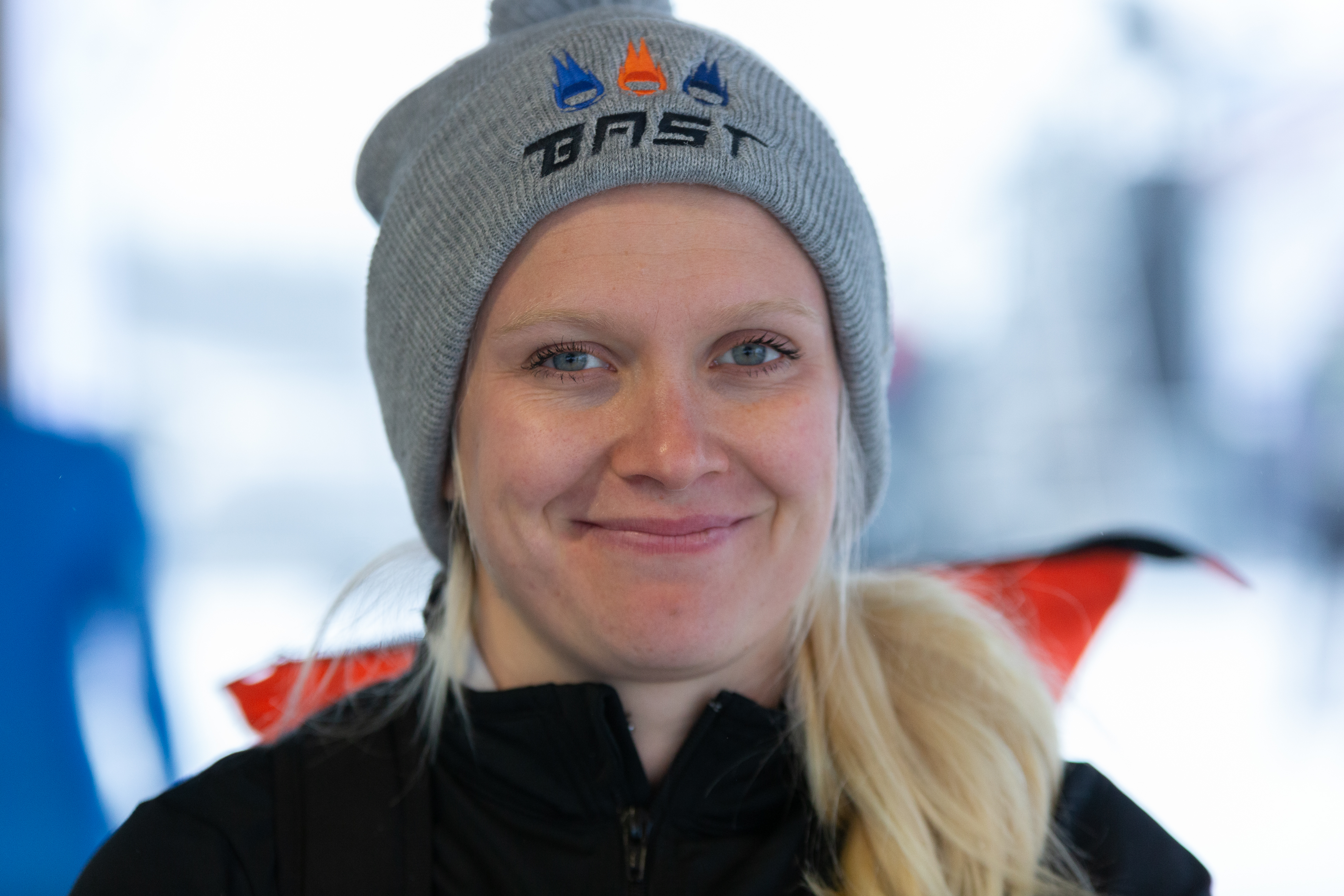
- Meylemans in 2019

Personal information
- Nationality: Belgian
- Born: 7 March 1996 (age 30) Amberg, Germany
- Height: 1.64 m (5 ft 5 in)
- Weight: 62 kg (137 lb)
- Spouse: Nicole Silveira (m. 2025)

Sport
- Country: Belgium
- Sport: Skeleton
- Retired: 30 May 2026

Achievements and titles
- Olympic finals: 6th (Milano Cortina 2026)
Medal record
Women's skeleton
Representing Belgium
World Championships
Silver medal – second place	2024 Winterberg	Women
European Championships
Gold medal – first place	2024 Sigulda	Women
Gold medal – first place	2026 St. Moritz	Women

Kim Meylemans (born 7 March 1996) is a German-born Belgian skeleton racer who competed on the Skeleton World Cup and in three Winter Olympic Games. After starting out in football, she began competing in skeleton in 2009. In 2012, competing for Germany, she finished fifth at the Winter Youth Olympic Games in Innsbruck, Austria. She was selected to the German national team in 2013. In the 2014–15 season, she moved to the Belgium national team. She was coached by Fernando Oliva (personal coach) and Martin Rettl (team coach), and rode a Schneider sled.

== Notable results ==
Meylemans finished 14 resp. 18th at the 2018 and 2022 Winter Olympics. Her experience at those latter games was spoiled by having been put in quarantine by the Chinese authorities after she tested positive for COVID-19 on arrival in Beijing. Having returned three negative PCR tests, Meylemans then had to "follow the close contact protocols for seven days", meaning she could "train and compete, live in the Olympic Village but needed to be in a single room, transported alone and needed to eat alone".

She became the first ever Belgian skeleton European champion on 2 February 2024, at the Skeleton World Cup race in Sigulda, Latvia and the first ever Belgian skeleton world championships medal winner on 23 February 2024, winning a silver at the Skeleton World Championships in Winterberg, Germany.

In December 2024, Meylemans celebrated her first victory on the World Cup circuit in Altenberg, Germany. Until then, Her best finish on the World Cup circuit had been a 2nd place at Sigulda, Latvia, also in 2024 and while winning the European championship.

In winter season 2025-26 Meylemans became Belgium's first overall World Cup winner in Women's Skeleton. On her way to the overal victory, she notched up three World Cup victories: two in Sigulda, Latvia and one in St. Moritz, Switzerland. As the latter race also counted as the continental championship for European athletes, Meylemans prolonged her European title from the previous year.

After a successful winter season of 2025–26, Meylemans entered the 2026 Winter Olympics in Milan and Cortina d'Ampezzo, Italy where she finished sixth.

In May 2026, at age 30, she announced her retirement from the sport.

== Personal life ==
Meylemans was born in Germany to Belgian parents, and holds dual citizenship. She is married to a fellow skeleton racer Nicole Silveira. The pair first claimed joint medal positions in January 2025 at the St. Moritz World Cup with Meylemans claiming silver to Silveira's bronze.
