= Nicole Silveira =

Brazilian skeleton racer (born 1994)

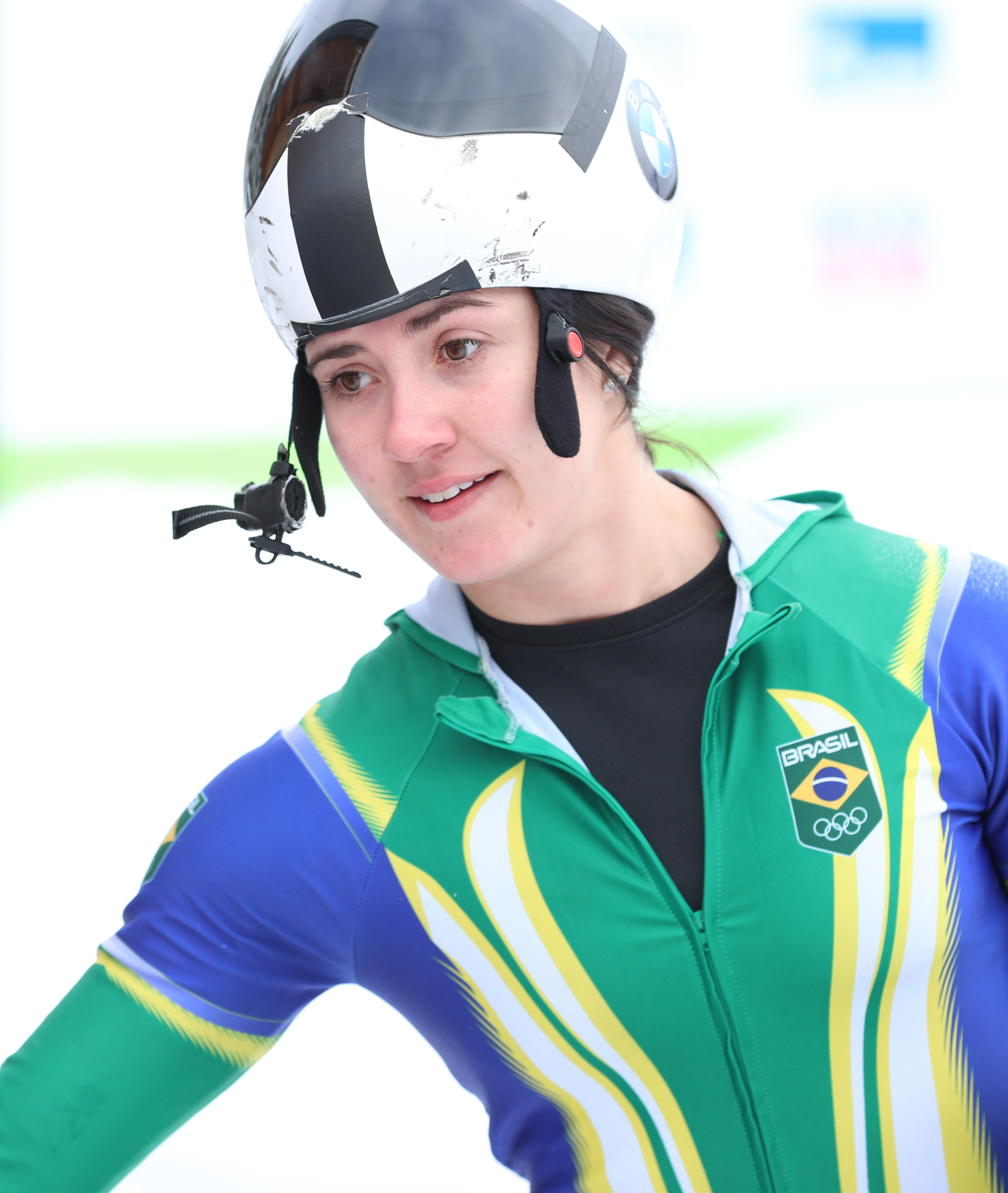
- Silveira in 2020

Personal information
- Full name: Nicole Rocha Silveira
- Nationality: Brazilian
- Born: 7 May 1994 (age 32) Rio Grande, Rio Grande do Sul, Brazil
- Height: 1.68 m (5 ft 6 in)
- Weight: 70 kg (154 lb)
- Spouse: Kim Meylemans (m. 2025)

Sport
- Country: Brazil
- Sport: Skeleton
Medal record
Women's skeleton
Representing Brazil
Skeleton World Cup
Bronze medal – third place	2024 PyeongChang	Women
Bronze medal – third place	2025 St. Moritz	Women
Bronze medal – third place	2026 St. Moritz	Women
IBSF Pan American Championships
Gold medal – first place	2025 Lake Placid	Women

Nicole Rocha Silveira (born 7 May 1994) is a Brazilian skeleton racer and former bobsledder who competes on the Skeleton World Cup.

Silveira represents Brazil at Winter Olympics.

At the 2026 Winter Olympics, Silveira achieved the best result ever recorded by a Brazilian athlete in sliding sports on the Winter Olympic Games history, placing 11th overall.

During the 2026 Winter Olympics, Silveira declared in an interview for Sportv that she considers herself to be among the best professional female skeleton racers in the world.

== Career ==
Silveira made her Skeleton World Championships debut in the 2019 edition in Whistler, finishing in 25th place. In the following edition in Altenberg, she finished in 24th place. She made her Skeleton World Cup debut in the 2020–21 season, where she only competed in 5 of the 8 scheduled races and finished 22nd overall. In the 2021 World Championships, Silveira finished in 17th.

Silveira started the 2021–22 season with three victories at the North American Cup in Whistler, won another race of the Intercontinental Cup also in Whistler, and won two more races of the North American Cup in Park City. After that great start, she went on to the World Cup, competing in the last six of the eight scheduled events and finishing 19th overall. In this season, she obtained her best World Cup result until then, a 9th place in Altenberg. In the following World Cup, Silveira competed in all races, starting the season with an 8th place in Whistler and finishing 11th overall. In the 2023 World Championships, she had her best result, finishing 16th. In the 2023–24 Skeleton World Cup, Silveira had her best World Cup result, a 7th place in Igls.

Silveira also competed in the 2017–18 Bobsleigh World Cup, where she placed 18th in the standings.

Representing Brazil at the 2022 Winter Olympics, she finished in 13th place after four runs. It was Brazil's best result in a Winter Olympics in sliding sports, and the second best result for the South American nation comprising all events.

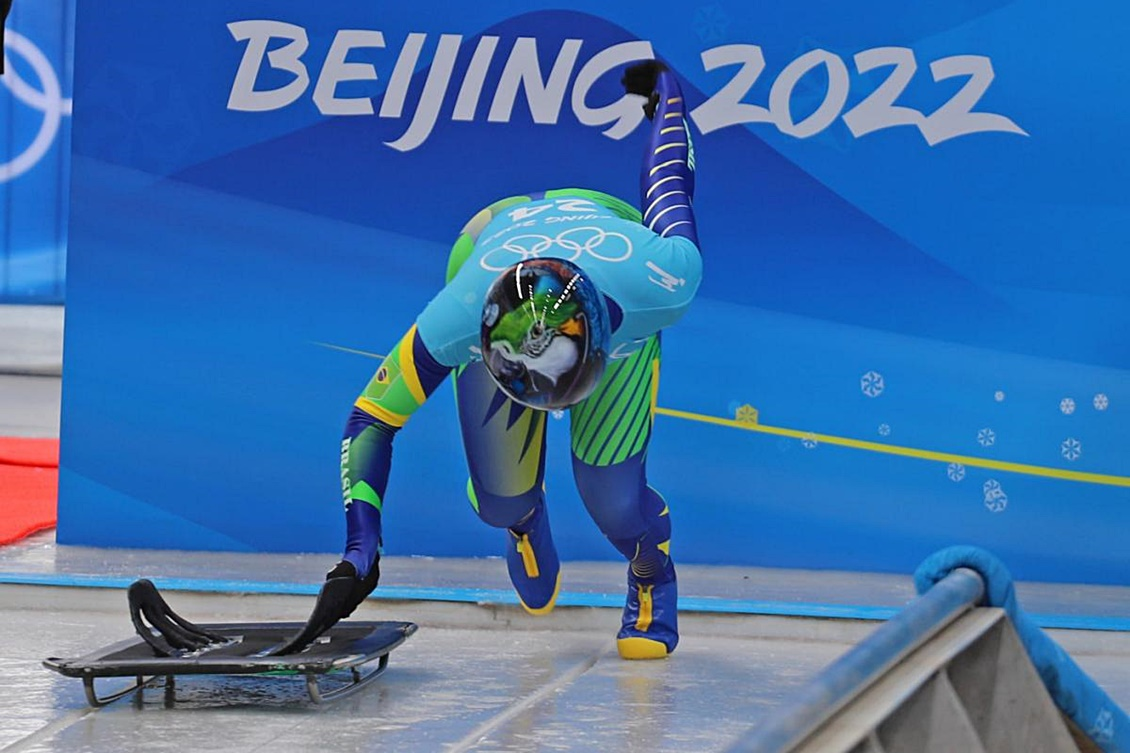
Silveira at the 2022 Winter Olympics

Silveira’s best career results were winning the bronze medal at two of the World Cup stages of the 2024–25 season, and another bronze medal at one of the World Cup stages of the 2025–26 season.

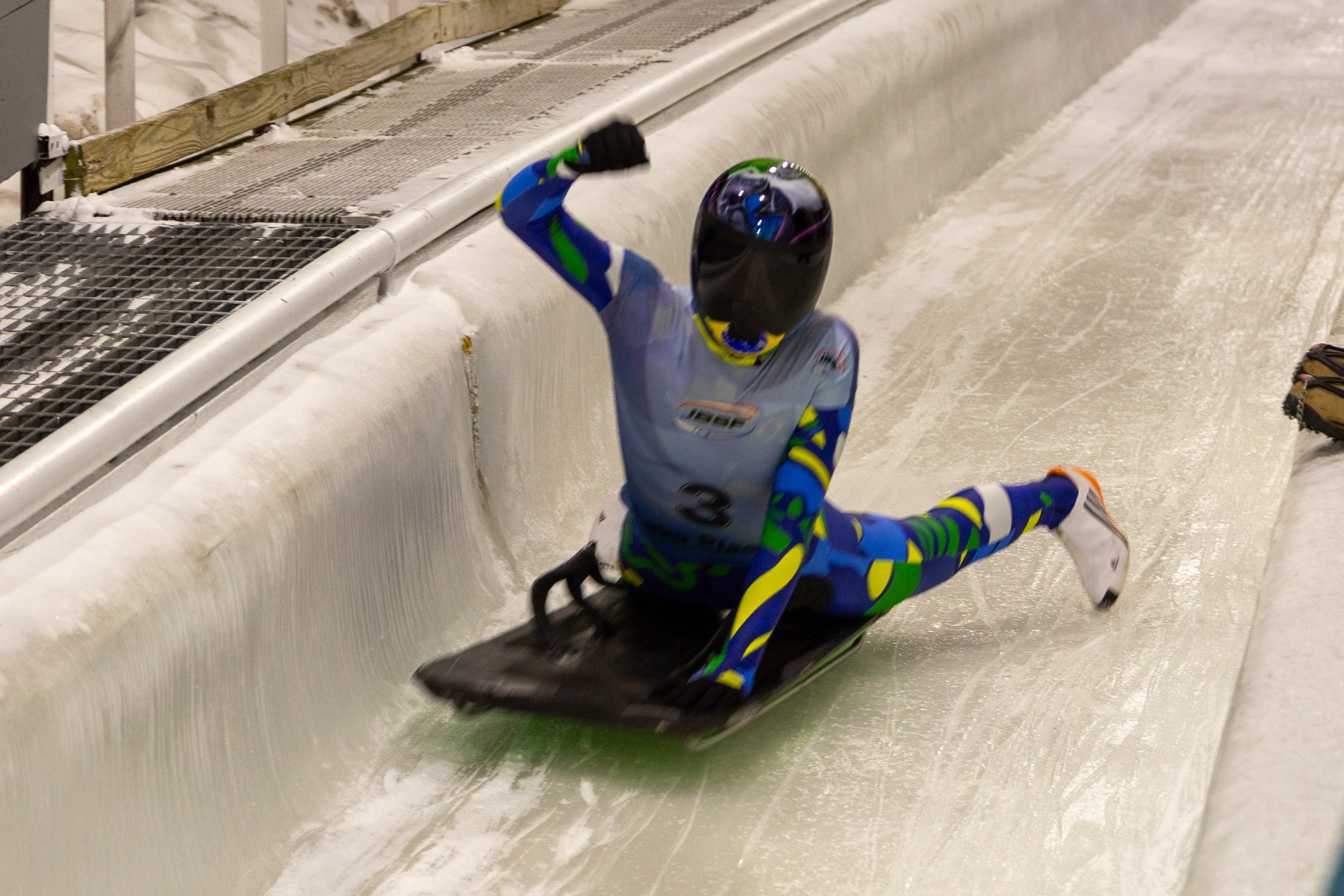
Silveira in 2025

On 6 February 2026, Silveira, participated in the opening of the 2026 Winter Olympics as the bearer of the flag of Brazil alongside Lucas Pinheiro Braathen.

On 13 and 14 February 2026, Silveira competed in the skeleton competition at the 2026 Winter Olympics, finishing 11th overall. With this result, she once again recorded the best performance by a Brazilian athlete in a sliding sport at the Winter Olympic Games, improving her results from the 2022 games.

== World Cup results ==
All results are sourced from the International Bobsleigh and Skeleton Federation (IBSF).

Season	1	2	3	4	5	6	7	8	Points	Place
2020–21	SIG 1; 18	SIG 2; 18	IGL 1; 18	IGL 2; 18	WIN; DNP	STM; DNP	KON; 20	IGL 3 DNP	388	22nd
2021–22	IGL 1 DNP	IGL 2 DNP	ALT 1; 14	WIN 1; 16	ALT 2; 9	SIG; 24	WIN 2; 18	STM; 18	565	19th
2022–23	WHI; 8	PAC; 10	LPL; 12	WIN; 14	ALT 1; 10	ALT 2; 16	IGL; 16	SIG; 12	1008	11th
2023–24	YAN; 11	LAP; 16	IGL; 7	STM; 12	LIL; 10	SIG; 26	ALT; 24	LAK; 18	833	14th
2024–25	PYE 1; 3	PYE 2; 6	YAN; DNP	ALT; 7	SIG; 14	WIN; 8	STM; 3	LIL; 6	1192	6th

DNP – did not participate

== Personal life ==
Silveira also practiced artistic gymnastics, football, volleyball, bodybuilding and weightlifting in her teenage years.

Silveira holds a nursing degree and works as a nurse at the Alberta Children's Hospital, Canada during skeleton off-season. She has been on the front line during the COVID-19 pandemic.

Silveira, who is openly bisexual, is married to a fellow skeleton racer Kim Meylemans.

== Team BB ==
A personal relationship between Nicole Silveira and her wife Kim Meylemans of Belgium led to the formation of a joint sporting initiative on the international skeleton circuit.

The partnership became known as “Team BB,” referencing the initials of Brazil and Belgium. The collaboration was motivated by the logistical and financial challenges faced by both nations, which are considered emerging competitors in the sport compared to traditional skeleton powerhouses. By combining financial resources and sharing technical staff and preparation structures, the athletes sought to strengthen their competitiveness in international competitions, such as the IBSF Skeleton World Cup.

In an interview with Olympics.com in November 2025, Silveira stated that the joint effort allowed two smaller skeleton nations to build a stronger team.

“We realized that we could combine our finances from Belgium and Brazil, two small nations in the sport, to form a strong team"- Declared Silveira to Olympics.com in November 2025.

“Belgium and Brazil are two B’s. She’s blonde, I’m brunette—two more B’s. Our coach’s last name is Bromley, so it’s all about the B’s. It’s also nice to feel like I have a team. I’m the only Brazilian on the World Cup circuit, so I used to do everything on my own—Kim did too. Now we have double the chances of winning a medal. If either she or I reaches the podium, it’s also a medal for the team.”- Silveira added
