= Jacqueline Pfeifer =

German skeleton racer (born 1995)

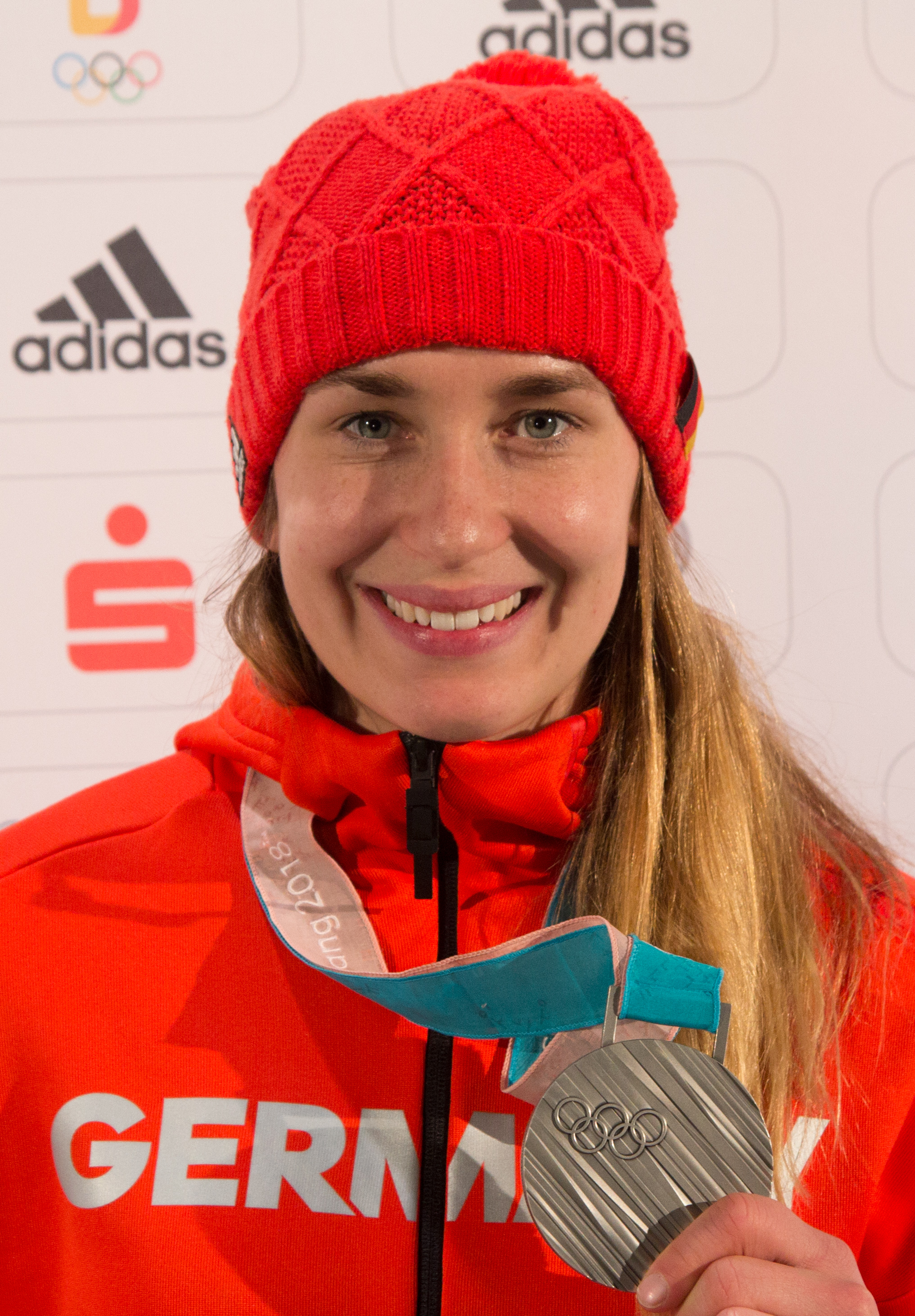
- Lölling in 2018

Personal information
- Nationality: German
- Born: 6 February 1995 (age 31) Weidenau, Germany
- Height: 1.80 m (5 ft 11 in)
- Weight: 75 kg (165 lb)

Sport
- Country: Germany
- Sport: Skeleton
- Club: RSG Hochsauerland
- Turned pro: 2007
- Coached by: Kathi Wichterle, Jens Müller

Achievements and titles
- Highest world ranking: 1st in Skeleton World Cup (2017, 2018, 2020)
Medal record
Olympic Games
Silver medal – second place	2018 Pyeongchang	Women
Bronze medal – third place	2026 Milano Cortina	Women
Bronze medal – third place	2026 Milano Cortina	Mixed team
World Championships
Gold medal – first place	2017 Königssee	Women
Gold medal – first place	2017 Königssee	Mixed team
Gold medal – first place	2020 Altenberg	Mixed team
Silver medal – second place	2015 Winterberg	Women
Silver medal – second place	2019 Whistler	Women
Silver medal – second place	2021 Altenberg	Women
Silver medal – second place	2021 Altenberg	Mixed team
Bronze medal – third place	2016 Igls	Mixed team
Bronze medal – third place	2024 Winterberg	Mixed team
European Championships
Gold medal – first place	2017 Winterberg	Women
Silver medal – second place	2018 Igls	Women
Bronze medal – third place	2019 Igls	Women
Bronze medal – third place	2026 St. Moritz	Women
Junior World Championships
Gold medal – first place	2015 Winterberg	Women
Winter Youth Olympic Games
Gold medal – first place	2012 Lillehammer	Girls

Jacqueline "Jacka" Pfeifer (née Lölling; born 6 February 1995) is a German skeleton racer who has won numerous races and championships, including the inaugural Winter Youth Olympics skeleton competition in 2012 and the 2017 World Championships. She is a three-time Winter Olympic medalist (1 silver, 2 bronze). Pfeifer began competing in skeleton at the age of 12 and was selected to the German national team in 2009. She won her first two international races, as a fifteen-year-old on the Europe Cup circuit, at Cesana Pariol in 2010. Her personal coach is Kathi Wichterle, and she rides an FES sled. When not racing, Pfeifer works for the German Federal Police.

== Notable results ==
Lölling raced on the Intercontinental Cup from 2011 to 2012 to 2014–15, ending with a string of three gold medals, as well as winning the Junior World Championships in 2014 at Winterberg and in 2015 at Altenberg. Rather than follow the other ICC sliders on the North American leg of the tour, she dropped back to Europe Cup racing for the remainder of the 2014–15 season and took home a silver from the senior World Championships at Winterberg. She joined the World Cup circuit for 2015–16. Lölling recorded five podiums that season, finishing the overall World Cup rankings in second place with 1550 points, behind teammate Tina Hermann.

Lölling recorded her first regular World Cup victory at Altenberg in the 2016–17 season, which she followed up with a silver at Winterberg, behind Elisabeth Vathje of Canada – giving Lölling the European Championship for 2017. She also won the pre-Olympic test event at Pyeongchang and the race at Königssee on her way to the overall Crystal Globe for the 2016–17 season.

In the 2017–18 season, Lölling won races at Whistler, Winterberg, and Altenberg, and placed fourth at Igls; the Igls race was also the 2018 European Championship, in which she was second behind Elena Nikitina of Russia.

== Career results ==
All results are sourced from the International Bobsleigh and Skeleton Federation (IBSF).

=== Olympic Games ===
Event	Women	Skeleton mixed team
(South Korea) 2018 Pyeongchang	2nd	—N/a
(China) 2022 Beijing	8th	—N/a
(Italy) 2026 Milano Cortina	3rd	3rd

=== World Championships ===
Event	Women	Skeleton mixed team	Mixed team
(Germany) 2015 Winterberg	2nd	—N/a	—
(Austria) 2016 Innsbruck	9th	—N/a	3rd
(Germany) 2017 Königssee	1st	—N/a	1st
(Canada) 2019 Whistler	2nd	—N/a	—
(Germany) 2020 Altenberg	4th	1st	—N/a
(Germany) 2021 Altenberg	2nd	2nd	—N/a
(Switzerland) 2023 St. Moritz	7th	—	—N/a
(Germany) 2024 Winterberg	5th	3rd	—N/a
(United States) 2025 Lake Placid	16th	4th	—N/a

=== World Cup results ===
Season	1	2	3	4	5	6	7	8	Points	Place
2015–16	3	2	2	8	7	3	4	2	1550	2nd
2016–17	2	5	1	2	8	1	9	1	1591	1st
2017–18	8	3	1	1	4	1	6	1	1628	1st
2018–19	5	1	2	3	3	1	—	—	1244	5th
2019–20	1	2	4	3	1	2	2	8	1632	1st
2020–21	8	7	6	3	4	3	1	—	1321	4th
2021–22	11	21	9	4	13	17	2	12	1088	10th
2022–23	—	—	—	—	6	—	—	—	176	25th
2023–24	–	4	8	6	9	9	6	5	1192	6th
2024–25	10	4	5	13	11	6	6	8	1288	5th
2025–26	1	4	8	7	5	5	1		1338	2nd
