= British Bobsleigh and Skeleton Association =

British sports association

The British Bobsleigh and Skeleton Association (BBSA) is the main sports governing body for bobsleigh and skeleton in the United Kingdom.

== History ==
British Bobsleigh was formed in 1927. It was known as the British Bobsleigh Association from 1980 until 2010, with its headquarters in Wiltshire. It moved to Bath in 1999. It was incorporated in October 1980. In 2010 it merged with the British Skeleton Association. The BBSA became the sports governing body for bobsleigh and skeleton in the UK in 2014.

== Structure ==
The organisation is headquartered at the University of Bath. It is affiliated to the International Bobsleigh and Skeleton Federation (IBSF, formerly FIBT).
