= Anna Fernstädt =

Czech-German skeleton racer (born 1996)

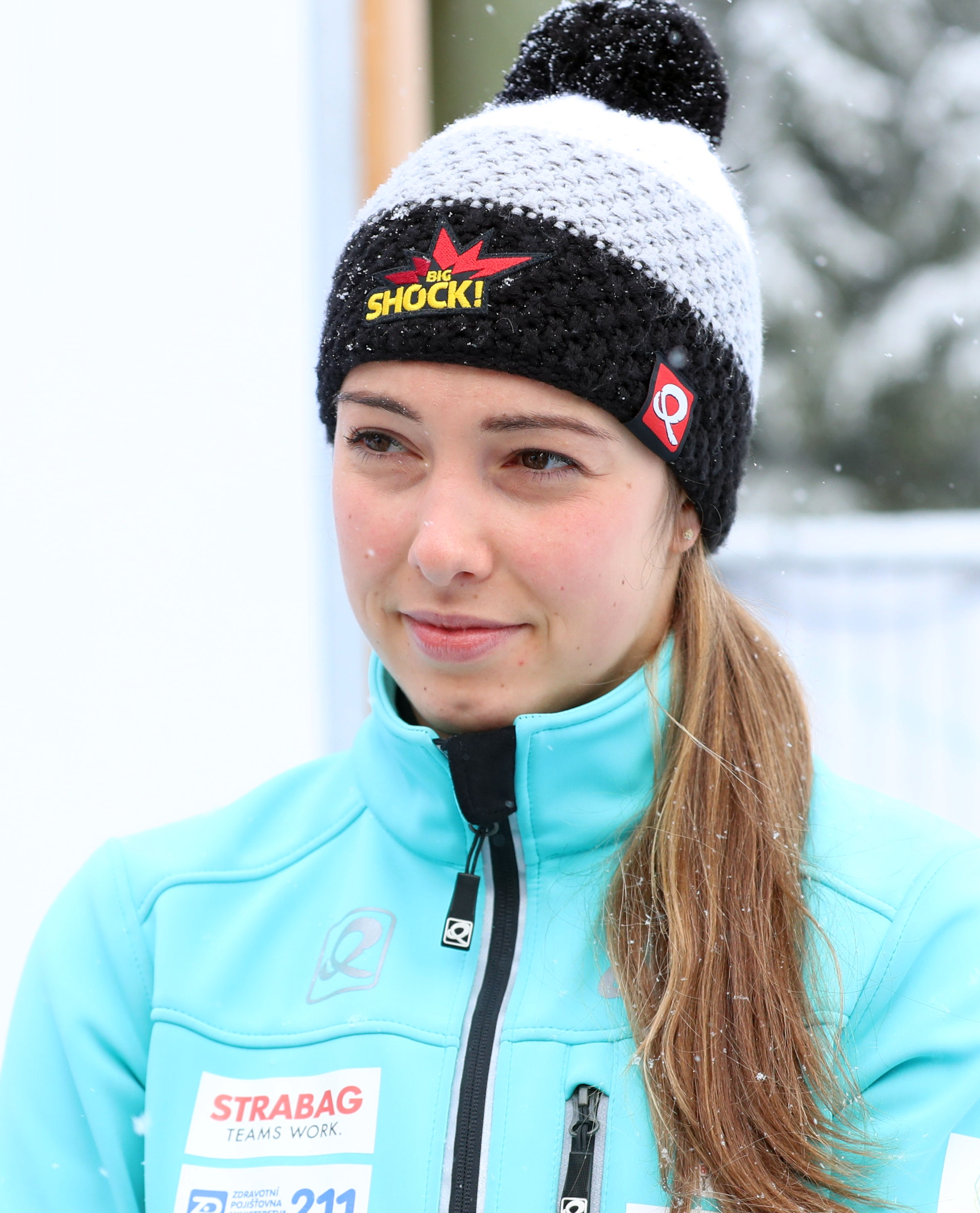
- Fernstädt at the 2020 World Championships

Personal information
- Nationality: German and Czech
- Born: 23 November 1996 (age 29) Prague, Czech Republic
- Height: 169 cm (5 ft 7 in)
- Weight: 68 kg (150 lb)

Sport
- Country: Czech Republic; Germany (2013–2018)
- Sport: Skeleton

Achievements and titles
- Olympic finals: 6th (2018 Pyeongchang) for Germany; 7th (2022 Beijing); 10th (2026 Milano Cortina) for Czech Republic
Medal record
Women's skeleton
Representing Germany
World Championships
Bronze medal – third place	2017 Königssee	Mixed team
Junior World Championships
Gold medal – first place	2018 St. Moritz	Women
Bronze medal – third place	2016 Winterberg	Women
Representing Czech Republic
World Championships
Bronze medal – third place	2025 Lake Placid	Women
Junior World Championships
Gold medal – first place	2019 Königssee	Women
Gold medal – first place	2020 Winterberg	Women

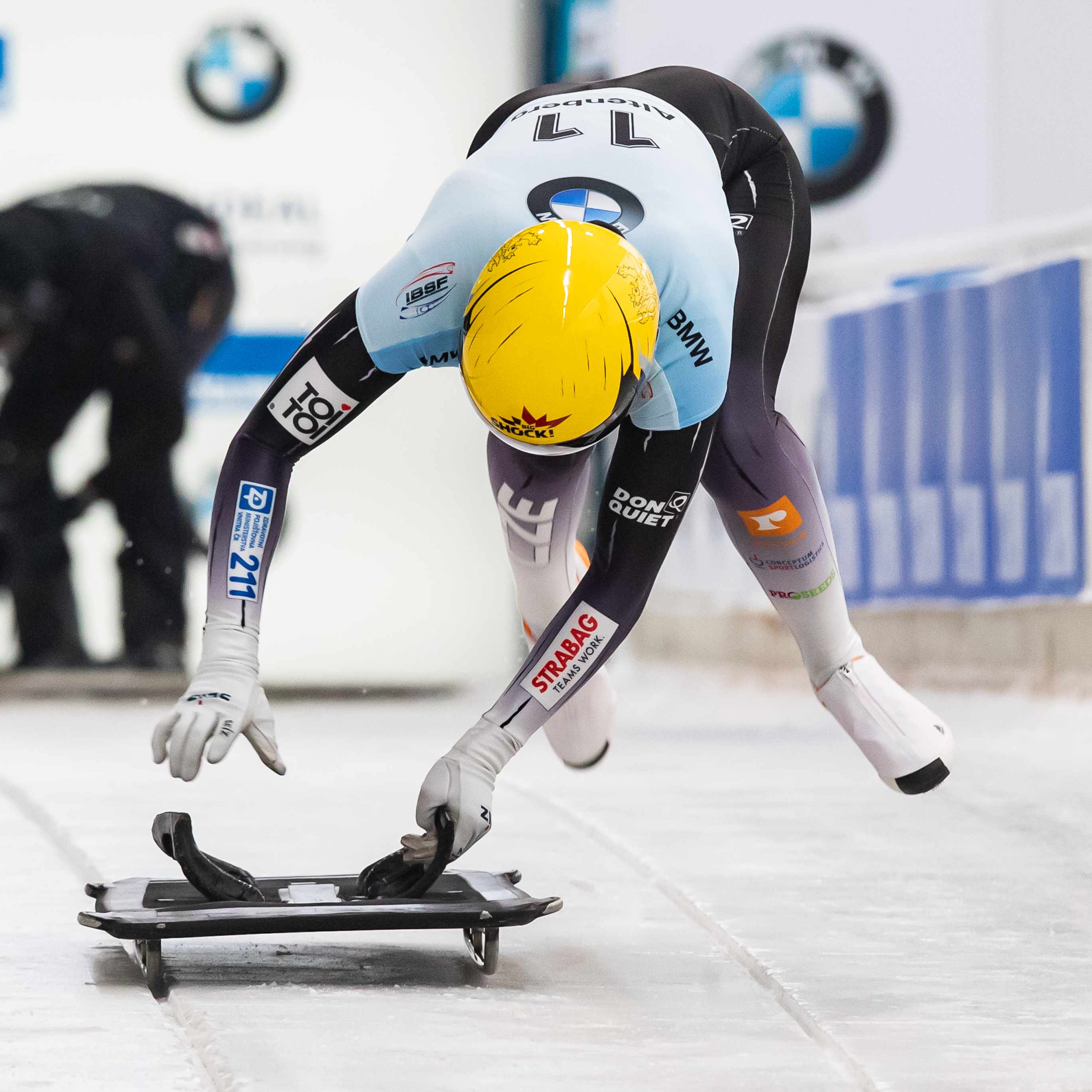
Anna Fernstädt jumps on a skeleton sled at the 2020 World Championships

Anna Fernstädt (born 23 November 1996 in Prague), also known as Anna Fernstädtová, is a Czech-German skeleton racer who competes on the Skeleton World Cup circuit. She started competing in 2011 and was selected to the German national team in 2013. In May 2018, she announced on her personal Twitter account that she was joining the Czech Republic team for the 2018–19 season.

She competed for Germany at the 2018 Winter Olympics and for the Czech Republic at the 2022 Winter Olympics and 2026 Winter Olympics.

== Notable results ==
Fernstädt started competing on the Europe Cup in 2013–14, where she quickly established herself with a string of five podium finishes, including three golds. She had fewer podiums in 2014–15, when she added the Intercontinental Cup to her schedule, but she had two ICC wins in 2015–16 and 2016–17. She finished fifth in the 2015 junior world championships at Altenberg, and earned bronze the following year in Winterberg.

Fernstädt's first season on the World Cup was 2016–17 when her best finish was a bronze at Königssee; that season, the world championships were held on the same Königssee track, and Fernstädt finished fourth but earned a bronze as part of an international squad in the mixed team competition. She started the 2017–18 season on the ICC but was promoted to the World Cup squad in the place of Sophia Griebel after winning three ICC races. She took bronze in the 2018 race at Altenberg, and won the 2018 Junior World Championships by 0.81 seconds, ahead of 2017 champion Yulia Kanakina.

After switching teams to the Czech Republic, Fernstädt competed at lower levels for the 2018–19 season to earn her new team a World Cup quota spot for the 2019–20 season.

== World Cup results ==
All results are sourced from the International Bobsleigh and Skeleton Federation (IBSF).

Season	1	2	3	4	5	6	7	8	Points	Place
2016–17	WHI; 8	LKP; 4	ALT; 4	WIN; 10	STM; 11	KON; 3	IGL —	PYE; 7	1192	8th
2017–18	LKP —	PKC —	WHI; 6	WIN; 9	IGL; 14	ALT; 3	STM; 5	KON; 5	1008	10th
2019–20	LKP1; 7	LKP2; 7	WIN; 11	LPL; 13	IGL; 20	KON; 8	STM; 11	SIG; 12	1084	9th
2020–21	SIG1; 4	SIG2; 10	IGL1; 8	IGL2; 9	WIN; 8	STM; 7	KON; 2	IGL3; 12	1314	5th
2021–22	IGL1; 14	IGL2; 16	ALT1; 12	WIN1; 20	ALT2; 8	SIG; 18	WIN2; 16	STM; 14	852	16th
2022–23	WHI; 4	PCT; 11	LPL; 10	WIN; 15	ALT1; 7	ALT2; 9	IGL; 17	SIG; 10	1128	7th
2023–24	YAN; 10	LAP; 14	IGL; 24	STM; 26	LIL; 24	SIG; 28	ALT; 15	LAK; 17	602	21st
2024–25	PYE1; 16	PYE2; 8	YAN; 8	ALT; 12	SIG; 10	WIN; 2	STM; 19	LIL; 15	1076	11th
2025–26	COR; 7	INN —	LIL; 10	SIG1; 4	SIG2; 2	WIN; 3	STM; 18	ALT; 7	1162	4th
