= Amelia Coltman =

British skeleton racer (born 1996)

Personal information
- Nationality: British
- Born: 5 April 1996 (age 30)

Sport
- Sport: Women's skeleton
Medal record
Women's skeleton
Representing Great Britain
European Championships
Silver medal – second place	2025 Lillehammer	Skeleton
Bronze medal – third place	2024 Sigulda	Skeleton

Amelia Coltman (born 5 April 1996) is a British former skeleton racer. She was a silver medalist at the 2025 European Championships, having been a bronze medalist in 2024.

== Early life ==
Coltam grew up in Melton Mowbray, Leicestershire. She attended De Lisle College and Loughborough College. During her youth, she played tennis at county level.

== Career ==
She won a bronze medal at the IBSF European Championships 2024 in Sigulda, Latvia. She followed that up with a sixth-placed finish on her World Championship debut in Germany three weeks later.

Alongside Marcus Wyatt, she won the fourth and final race of the season in the Skeleton Mixed 2024–25 Skeleton World Cup in Lillehammer, Norway. That season in the World Cup, she her first World Cup medal by winning the first event in South Korea in November 2024. She won a silver medal at the IBSF European Championships 2025 in Lillehammer.

In the 2025–26 Skeleton World Cup, Coltman finished third in Sigulda. At the 2026 Winter Olympics, she finished ninth in the women's skeleton.

Coltman retired from the sport in July 2026.

== Personal life ==
Her parents, Gary and Theresa, were both national cycling champions. She trained in Skeleton at the University of Bath.
