= Axel Jungk =

German skeleton racer (born 1991)

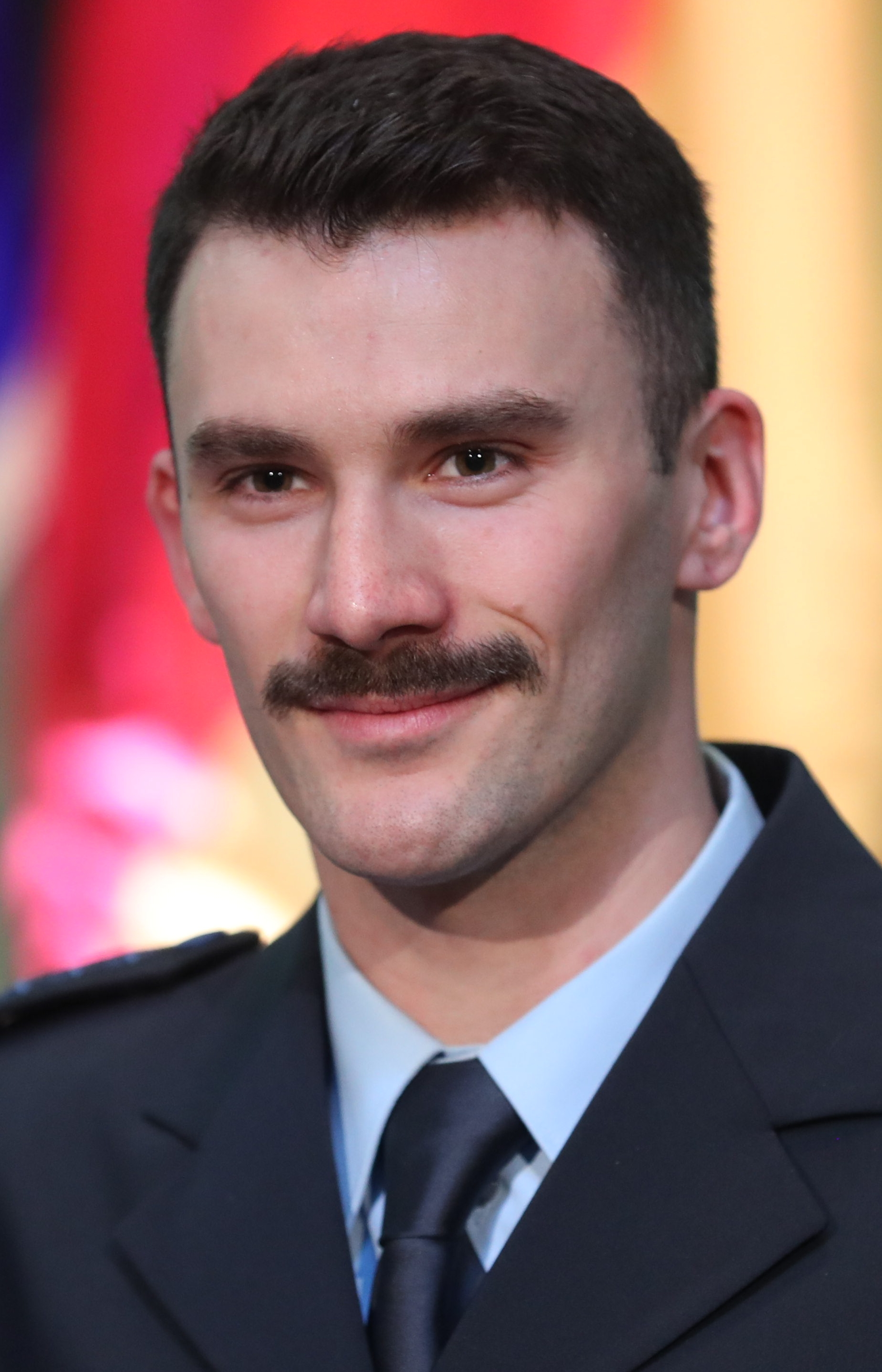
- Jungk in 2022

Personal information
- Nationality: German
- Born: 13 April 1991 (age 35) Zschopau, Germany
- Height: 1.83 m (6 ft 0 in)
- Weight: 82 kg (181 lb)

Sport
- Country: Germany
- Sport: Skeleton
- Club: BSC Sachsen Oberbärenburg
Medal record
Men's skeleton
Representing Germany
Olympic Games
| Silver medal – second place | 2022 Beijing | Men |
| Silver medal – second place | 2026 Milano Cortina | Men |
| Silver medal – second place | 2026 Milano Cortina | Mixed team |
World Championships
| Gold medal – first place | 2015 Winterberg | Mixed team |
| Gold medal – first place | 2016 Igls | Mixed team |
| Gold medal – first place | 2017 Königssee | Mixed team |
| Silver medal – second place | 2017 Königssee | Men |
| Silver medal – second place | 2020 Altenberg | Men |
| Bronze medal – third place | 2024 Winterberg | Mixed team |
| Bronze medal – third place | 2025 Lake Placid | Men |
European Championships
| Gold medal – first place | 2026 St. Moritz | Mixed team |
| Silver medal – second place | 2019 Igls | Men |
| Bronze medal – third place | 2018 Igls | Men |
| Bronze medal – third place | 2023 Altenberg | Men |
| Bronze medal – third place | 2025 Lillehammer | Men |

Axel Jungk (born 13 April 1991) is a German skeleton racer who represents his nation in the Skeleton World Cup. He is a three-time Winter Olympic silver medalist and three-time IBSF World Championships gold medalist.

== Career ==
Jungk finished third in the standings in the 2014–15 Skeleton World Cup season. In the 2015–16 Skeleton World Cup season, he secured fourth place overall, tying with Alexsandr Tretyakov for silver at Winterberg and earning a bronze at Park City. He once again finished fourth in the 2016–17 World Cup circuit, adding a bronze at Altenberg.

Jungk finished in second place in the standings in the 2017–18 Skeleton World Cup, racking up a total of 1,507 points from gold at Königssee, a silver at St. Moritz and a bronze at Park City.

Jungk finished fourth in the 2018–19 Skeleton World Cup with a silver at Winterberg and a bronze in Igls.

He began the 2019–20 Skeleton World Cup season with a win at Lake Placid.

Jungk took the silver medal in the Men's Skeleton Singles contest at the 2022 Winter Olympics in Beijing, PRC, finishing behind his countryman Christopher Grotheer who won Germany's first ever Gold medal in the event.

== Career results ==
All results are sourced from the International Bobsleigh and Skeleton Federation (IBSF).

=== Olympic Games ===
| Event | Men | Skeleton mixed team |
|---|---|---|
| (South Korea) 2018 Pyeongchang | 7th | —N/a |
| (China) 2022 Beijing | 2nd | —N/a |
| (Italy) 2026 Milano Cortina | 2nd | 2nd |

=== World Championships ===
| Event | Men | Skeleton mixed team | Mixed team |
|---|---|---|---|
| (United States) 2012 Lake Placid | 22nd | —N/a | — |
| (Germany) 2015 Winterberg | 6th | —N/a | 1st |
| (Austria) 2016 Innsbruck | 4th | —N/a | 1st |
| (Germany) 2017 Königssee | 2nd | —N/a | 1st |
| (Canada) 2019 Whistler | 10th | —N/a | DNS |
| (Germany) 2020 Altenberg | 2nd | — | —N/a |
| (Switzerland) 2023 St. Moritz | 18th | — | —N/a |
| (Germany) 2024 Winterberg | 5th | 3rd | —N/a |
| (United States) 2025 Lake Placid | 3rd | 5th | —N/a |

=== World Cup results ===
| Season | 1 | 2 | 3 | 4 | 5 | 6 | 7 | 8 | Points | Place |
|---|---|---|---|---|---|---|---|---|---|---|
| 2014–15 | 4 | 5 | 5 | 7 | 6 | 7 | 9 | 6 | 1408 | 3rd |
| 2015–16 | 4 | 2 | 6 | 4 | 3 | 9 | 8 | 4 | 1474 | 4th |
| 2016–17 | 6 | 6 | 3 | 6 | 7 | 4 | 4 | 7 | 1448 | 4th |
| 2017–18 | 4 | 3 | 9 | 6 | 4 | 8 | 2 | 1 | 1507 | 2nd |
| 2018–19 | 8 | 2 | 5 | 3 | 5 | 5 | 7 | 7 | 1458 | 5th |
| 2019–20 | 3 | 4 | 3 | 5 | 14 | 4 | 3 | – | 1305 | 7th |
| 2020–21 | – | – | – | – | – | – | 4 | – | 192 | 31st |
| 2021–22 | 4 | 5 | 1 | 2 | 2 | 12 | 2 | 4 | 1551 | 2nd |
| 2022–23 | 4 | 7 | 5 | 2 | 3 | 3 | 7 | 10 | 1466 | 5th |
| 2023–24 | – | 13 | 9 | 9 | 2 | 16 | 9 | 14 | 1010 | 11th |
| 2024–25 | 9 | 16 | 9 | 4 | 10 | 10 | 4 | 4 | 1264 | 5th |
