= Yin Zheng (skeleton racer) =

Chinese skeleton racer (born 1996)

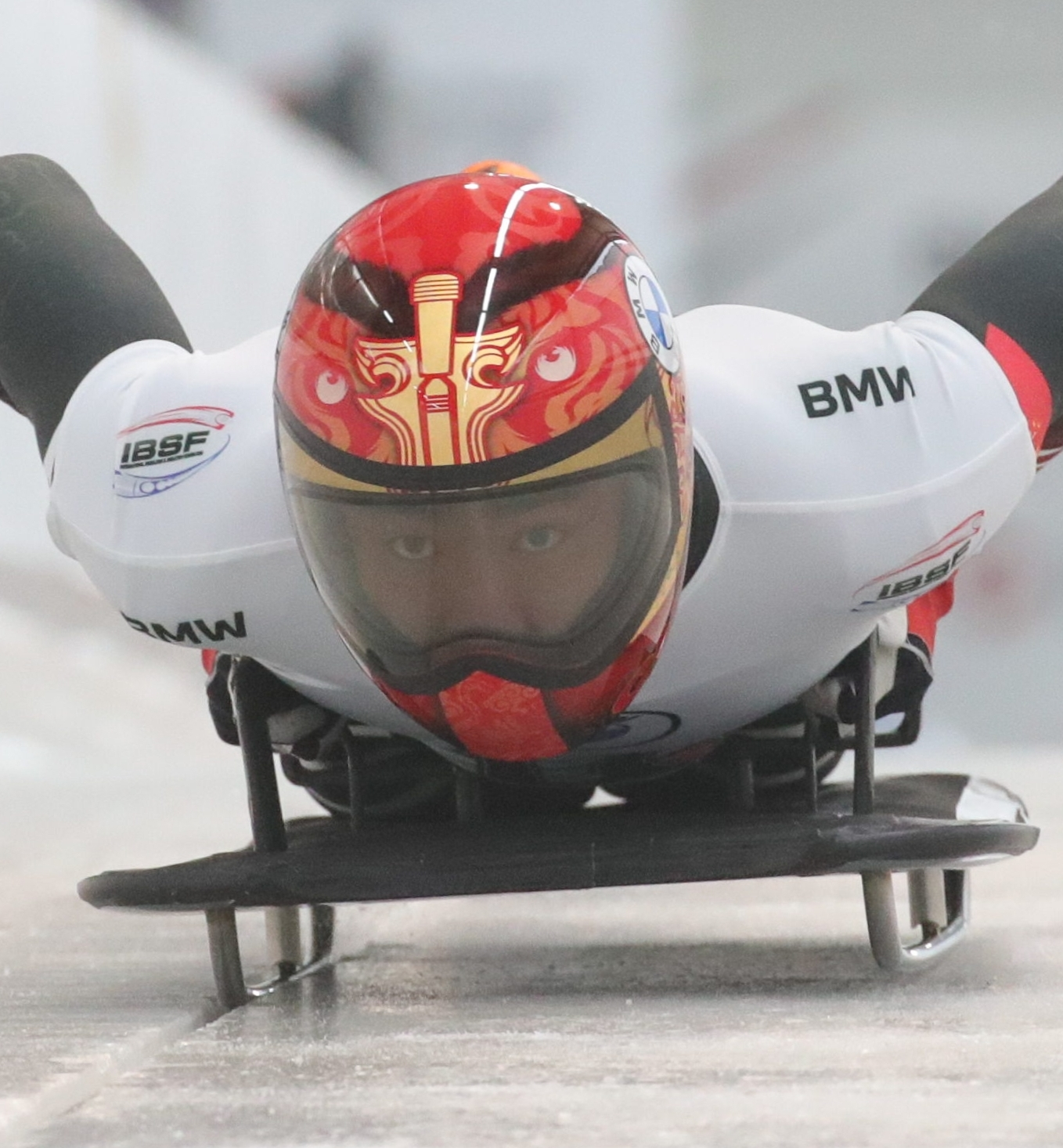
- Zheng in 2023

Personal information
- Nationality: Chinese
- Born: 7 March 1996 (age 30) Jincheng

Sport
- Country: China
- Sport: Skeleton

Yin Zheng (Chinese: 殷正; born 7 March 1996) is a skeleton athlete who competed for China in the men's skeleton at the 2022 Winter Olympic Games in the capital of his home country, Beijing. He placed 5th at the event.

== Career results ==
All results are sourced from the International Bobsleigh and Skeleton Federation (IBSF).

Event	Men	Skeleton mixed team
(Switzerland) 2023 St. Moritz	11th	—
(Germany) 2024 Winterberg	3rd	9th
(United States) 2025 Lake Placid	5th	—
