= Samuel Maier =

Austrian skeleton racer (born 1999)

- Maier in 2026

Personal information
- Nationality: Austrian
- Born: 3 October 1999 (age 26) Tirol, Austria

Sport
- Country: Austria
- Sport: Skeleton

Samuel Maier (born 3 October 1999) is an Austrian skeleton athlete who competed in the skeleton competition at the 2022 and 2026 Winter Olympics, finishing 13th and 14th respectively. He also competed at the 2016 Winter Youth Olympic Games in Lilehammer.

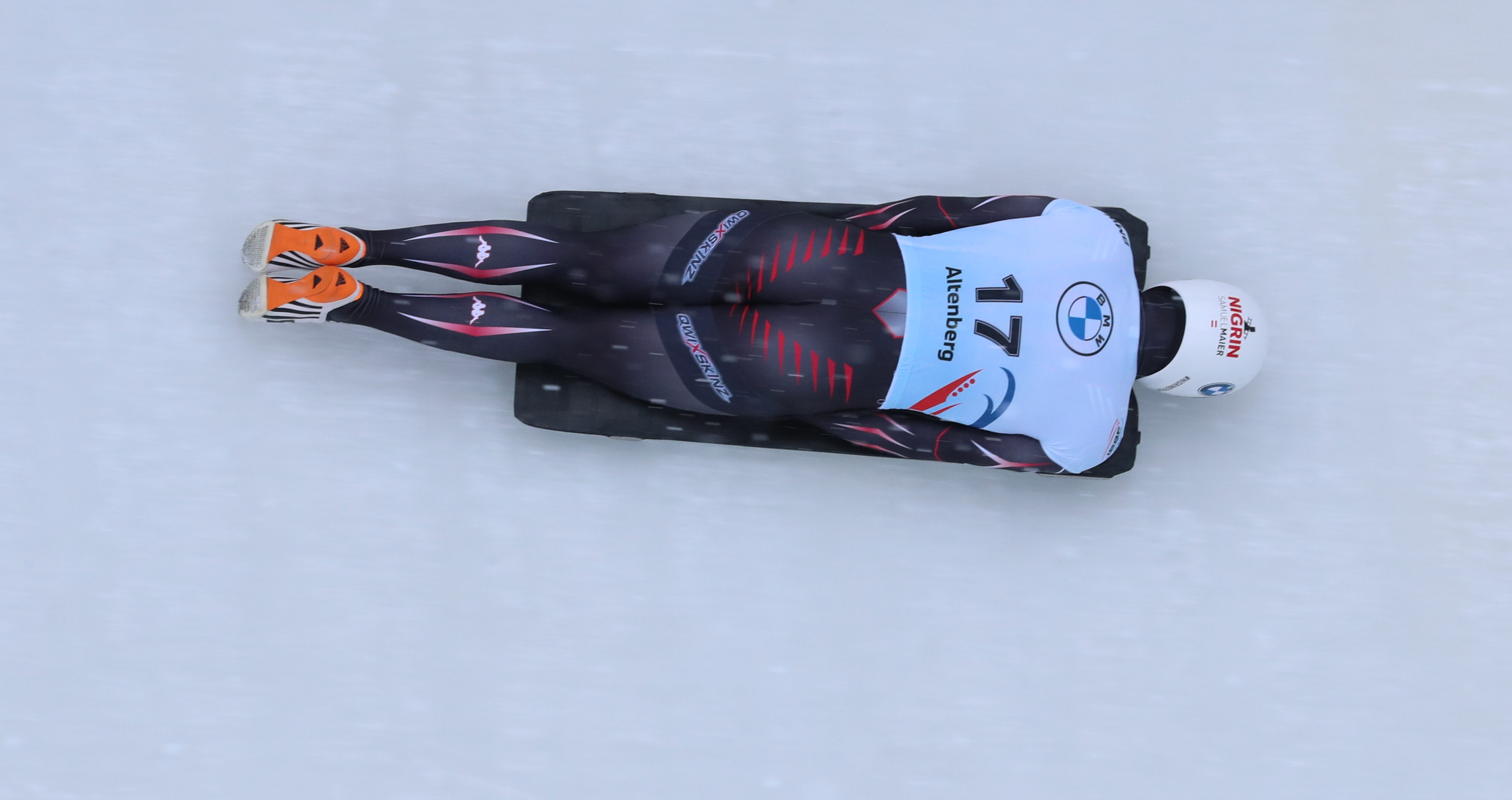
Maier at the 2021 World Championships in Altenberg

== Career results ==
=== Olympic Games ===
Event	Men	Skeleton mixed team
(China) 2022 Beijing	13th	—N/a
(Italy) 2026 Milano Cortina	14th	9th

=== World Championships ===
Event	Men	Skeleton mixed team
(Germany) 2020 Altenberg	19th	—
(Germany) 2021 Altenberg	11th	—
(Switzerland) 2023 St. Moritz	17th	—
(Germany) 2024 Winterberg	13th	8th
(United States) 2025 Lake Placid	15th	9th
