= Mystique Ro =

American skeleton racer (born 1994)

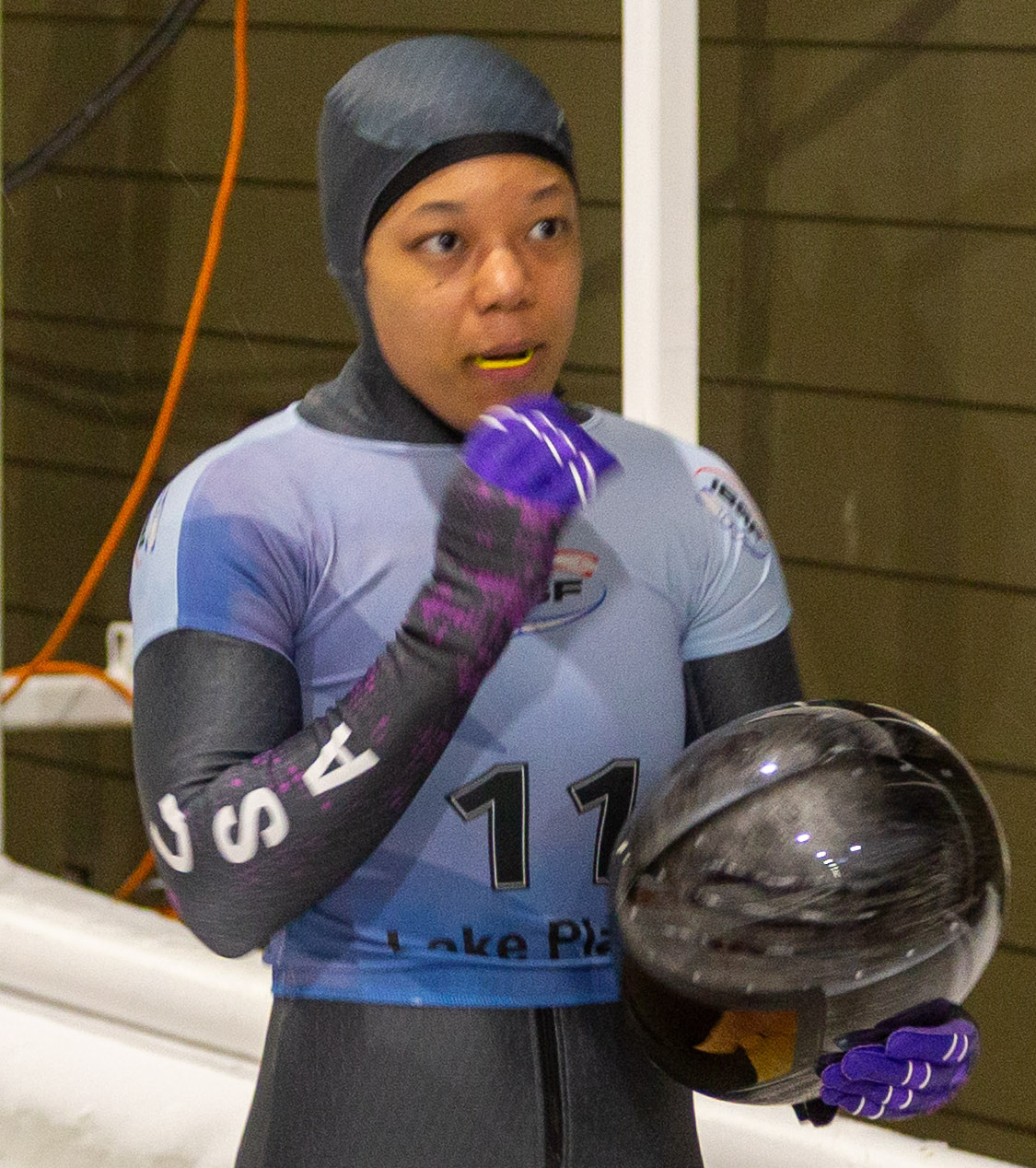
- Ro at the 2025 IBSF World Championships

Personal information
- Born: July 18, 1994 (age 32) Oceanside, California, U.S.

Sport
- Country: United States
- Sport: Skeleton
Medal record
Women's skeleton
Representing the United States
World Championships
Gold medal – first place	2025 Lake Placid	Mixed team
Silver medal – second place	2025 Lake Placid	Women
Pan American Championships
Gold medal – first place	2024 Lake Placid	individual

Mystique Ro (born July 18, 1994) is an American skeleton racer. She represented the United States at the 2026 Winter Olympics.

== Early life ==
Ro attended Queens University of Charlotte where she was a track and field athlete and heptathlete. When she signed up for a bobsledding recruitment event, coaches suggested her 5-foot-4 stature was better suited to skeleton.

== Skeleton career ==
Ro represented the United States at the IBSF World Championships in 2025 and won a gold medal in the mixed team event, along with Austin Florian. She also won a silver medal in the women's event, becoming the first American to medal in the event since Noelle Pikus-Pace in 2013.

Ro told a reporter that in eight years of skeleton racing, she achieved a flow state merely three times, but she would continue to pursue that goal.

== Personal life ==
Ro was born to Kyu and Tamara Ro, and has eight brothers and two sisters, including a twin sister who is 14 minutes younger. Ro has said that downhill ski racing makes her queasy, even though she races at up to 90 miles per hour, adding that speed racing while standing up is "a whole different ballgame". She has described her fear of roller coasters. Working as a tour guide at the Lake Placid Olympic Center has helped Ro fund her career.

Her paternal uncle is Sean Ro, a Korean hip hop artist.
