= Cortina Sliding Centre =

Winter sports venue in Italy

- Interactive map of Cortina Sliding Centre
- Address: 32045; Cortina d'Ampezzo, Veneto; Italy
- Field shape: Bobsleigh/Skeleton: 1,750m (5,741ft); Luge (men's singles): 1,478m (4,849ft); Luge (women's singles/men's doubles): 1,278m (4,192ft); Curves: 16; Vertical Drop: TBD; Max. Gradient: TBD; Avg. Gradient: TBD; Max. Speed: TBD

Construction
- Groundbreaking: February 2024
- Opened: November 2025
- Cost: €118 million

The Cortina Sliding Centre, also known as the Eugenio Monti Sliding Centre, is a sliding venue in the alpine village of Cortina d'Ampezzo in Veneto, Italy. It was purpose-built to host the bobsleigh, skeleton and luge events of the 2026 Winter Olympics.

The track is a full reconstruction of the Eugenio Monti Olympic Track which sat on the same site from 1923 until its closure in 2008. The current track is similar in length to the original and has the same number of curves, but the new layout meets modern design, layout, and safety standards set out by the International Bobsleigh and Skeleton Federation (IBSF) and the Federation International de Luge (FIL).

== Planning and construction ==
When the original bid for the 2026 Olympic Games was first launched by northern Italy, the venue plan included a major renovation of the abandoned track at Cesana Pariol, which was built for the Torino 2006 Olympic Games, as it was in much better condition than the track in Cortina, which had not been renovated since 1981, and was abandoned completely in 2008. By the time the bid was finalized, it included a loose plan to renovate the abandoned track in Cortina. It was later determined that if the organizing committee wanted to host sliding events in Italy, an entirely new venue would need to be constructed. Demolition of the old track in Cortina began in March 2023. Despite political concerns stemming from future legacy and sustainability of the venue, issues finding a contractor willing to build the venue, and even the International Olympic Committee calling for the sliding events to be staged on an existing track outside of Italy, construction began in February 2024.

In just 13 months, the track was ready for pre-homologation, which took place from 24–28 March 24–28 2025. A temporary roof made of wood and white plastic wrapping was put over the track as construction was still in progress. The track and its facilities were completed and opened on 5 November 2025.

== Approval before the games ==
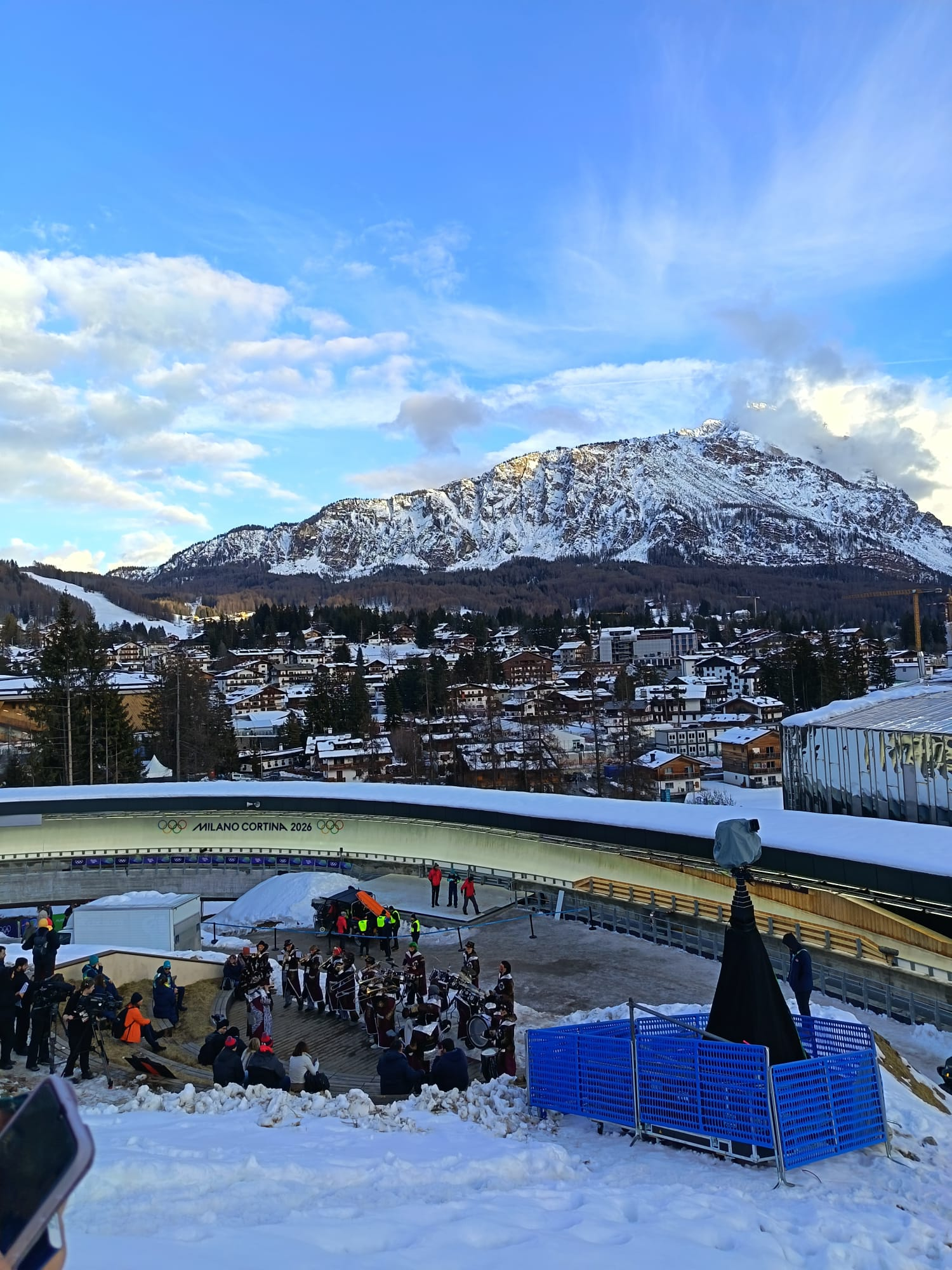
The sliding Centre during the 2026 Winter Olympics.

From 24 to 28 March 2025, 60 bobsleigh, skeleton, and luge athletes from 12 countries took part in the pre-homologation of the new track. Athletes began their first runs roughly half way up the track, starting slightly higher each time as they became familiar with each curve at higher speeds. After four days of testing, athletes, coaches and officials from both the IBSF and FIL, the governing bodies for bobsleigh and skeleton and luge respectfully, unanimously approved of the new track, and considered the pre-testing events a success. This was a major step in confirming the new track's ability to host events for the 2026 Olympic Games.

In late 2025, international training periods have been planned by the IBSF and FIL to allow all internationally competing athletes to learn and train on the new track well ahead of the Olympic Games. Luge athletes began this training on 27 October. Bobsleigh and Skeleton athletes had a training blocks from 7 to 16 November, immediately followed by the opening week of the IBSF World Cup, where further training and official racing took place from 17 to 23 November. Finally, athletes returned to Cortina in the days leading up to the start of the 2026 Olympic Games for a final training period before the Olympic competition began.
