= Janine Flock =

Austrian skeleton racer (born 1989)

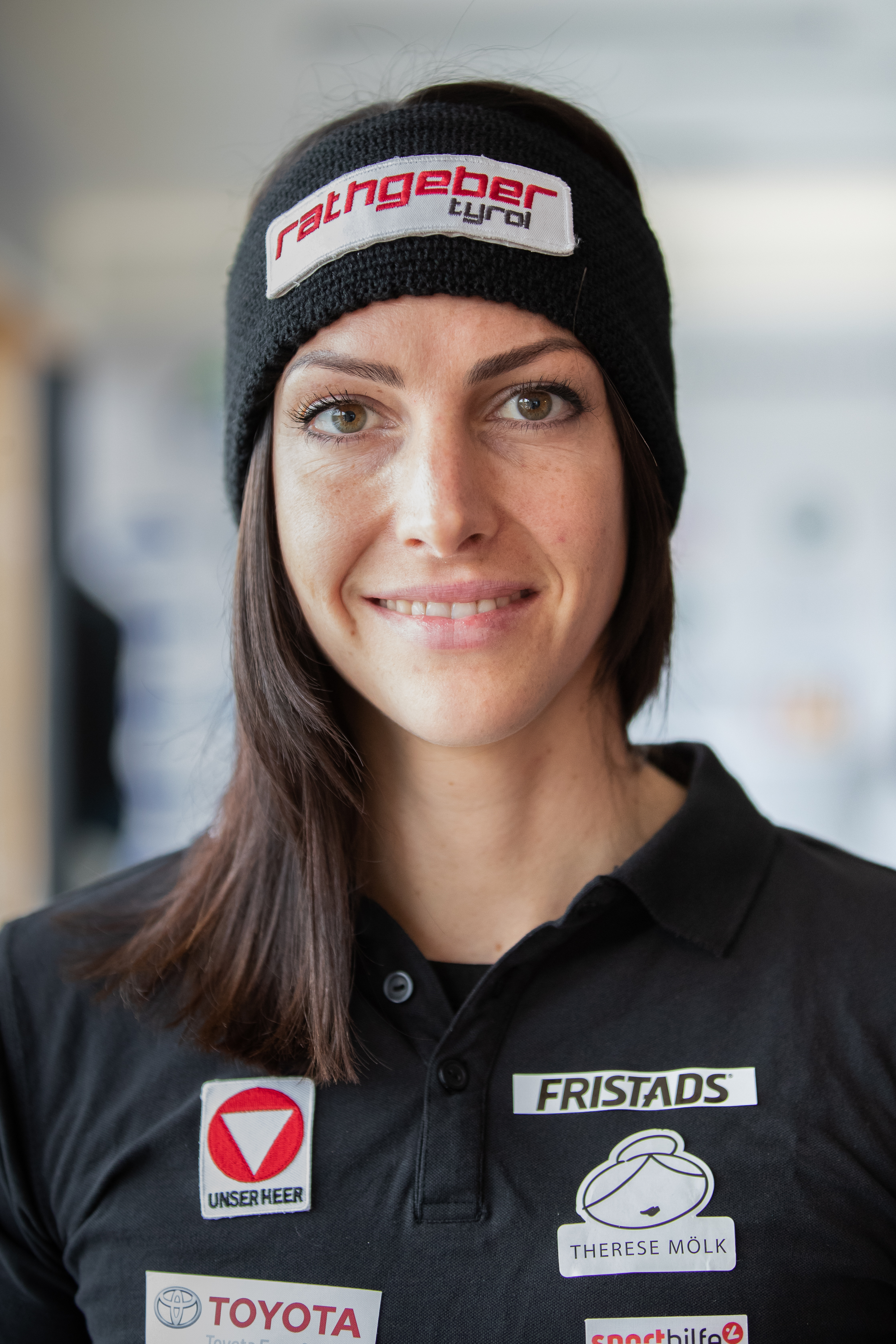
- Flock in 2020

Personal information
- Nationality: Austrian
- Born: 25 July 1989 (age 36) Hall in Tirol, Austria
- Height: 175 cm (5 ft 9 in)
- Weight: 63 kg (139 lb)

Sport
- Country: Austria
- Sport: Skeleton

Achievements and titles
- Olympic finals: 9th (Sochi 2014); 4th (Pyeongchang 2018); 1st (Milan-Cortina 2026)
Medal record
Women's skeleton
Representing Austria
Olympic Games
Gold medal – first place	2026 Milano Cortina	Women
World Championships
Silver medal – second place	2016 Igls	Women
Silver medal – second place	2016 Igls	Mixed team
Bronze medal – third place	2020 Altenberg	Women
European Championships
Gold medal – first place	2014 Königssee	Women
Gold medal – first place	2016 St. Moritz	Women
Gold medal – first place	2019 Igls	Women
Gold medal – first place	2025 Lillehammer	Women
Silver medal – second place	2015 Igls	Women
Silver medal – second place	2017 Winterberg	Women
Silver medal – second place	2022 St. Moritz	Women
Silver medal – second place	2023 Altenberg	Women
Bronze medal – third place	2013 Igls	Women
Bronze medal – third place	2018 Igls	Women
Bronze medal – third place	2020 Sigulda	Women
Bronze medal – third place	2021 Winterberg	Women

Janine Flock (Austrian German: [ʒaˈniːn ˈflɔk]; born 25 July 1989) is an Austrian skeleton racer and the 2026 Olympic champion. She was a participant at the 2014 Winter Olympics, the 2018 Winter Olympics, and the 2022 Winter Olympics. In February 2015, she became the first Austrian woman to win an overall World Cup skeleton title. She came in second at the 2016 World Championships and third at the 2020 World Championships and is regarded as the best woman skeleton racer in Austrian history.

Her gold medal win in women's Olympic skeleton singles at the 2026 Olympics made her the oldest-ever medal winner in women's Olympic skeleton, and the oldest-ever Austrian Winter Olympics gold medal winner, at age 36.
