= Austin Florian =

American skeleton racer (born 1994)

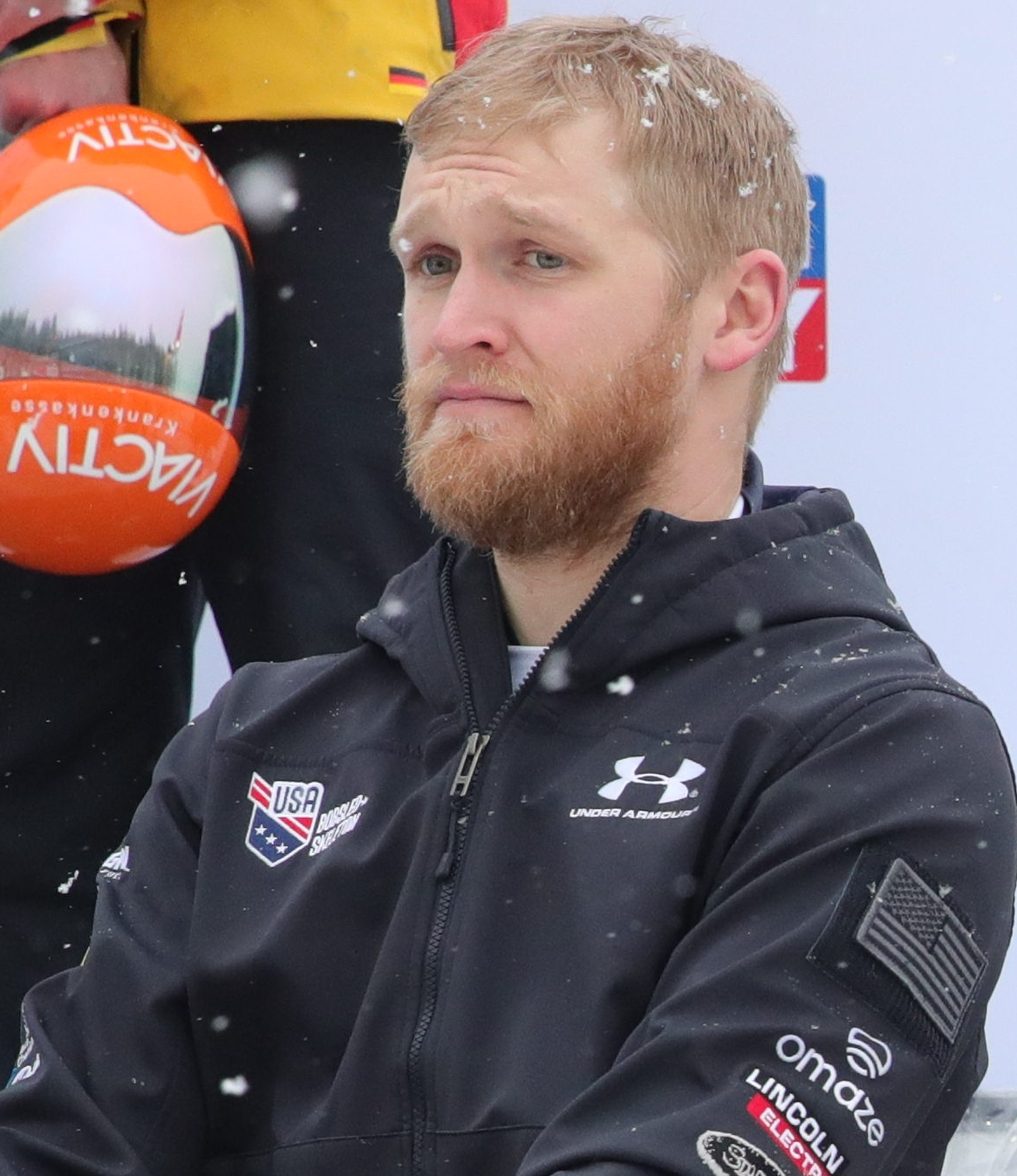
- Florian in 2023

Personal information
- Born: September 12, 1994 (age 31) Southington, Connecticut, U.S.

Sport
- Country: United States
- Sport: Skeleton
Medal record
Men's skeleton
Representing the United States
World Championships
Gold medal – first place	2025 Lake Placid	Mixed team

Austin Florian (born September 12, 1994) is an American skeleton racer.

== Early life ==
Florian attended Southington High School in Southington, Connecticut. He then attended Clarkson University where he was an alpine skier.

== Career ==
Florian represented the United States at the IBSF World Championships in 2025 and won a gold medal in the mixed team event, along with Mystique Ro, in a time of 1:54.53.
