= 2017–18 Skeleton World Cup =

Skeleton world championship season

Winners
- Men's: Yun Sung-bin (KOR)
- Women's: Jacqueline Lölling (GER)

Competitions
- Venues: 8 (8 events)

The 2017–18 Skeleton World Cup was a multi-race series over a season for Skeleton. The season started on 9 November 2017 in Lake Placid, USA, and concluded on 19 January 2018 in Königssee, Germany. The World Cup is organised by the IBSF (formerly the FIBT), who also run World Cups and Championships in bobsleigh. The season was mainly sponsored by BMW.

== Calendar ==
Venue	Date	Details
(United States) Lake Placid	9–10 November	
(United States) Park City	17–18 November	
(Canada) Whistler	24–25 November	
(Germany) Winterberg	8 December	Men's race shortened to one run
(Austria) Igls	15 December	also European Championship
(Germany) Altenberg	5 January	
(Switzerland) St. Moritz	12 January	
(Germany) Königssee	19 January	

== Results ==
=== Men ===
Event:	Gold:	Time	Silver:	Time	Bronze:	Time
(United States) Lake Placid	Martins Dukurs; Latvia	1:47.54 (53.66 / 53.88)	Yun Sung-bin; South Korea	1:47.65 (53.76 / 53.89)	Alexander Tretiakov; Russia	1:47.71 (53.71 / 54.00)
(United States) Park City	Yun Sung-bin; South Korea	1:37.32 (48.82 / 48.50)	Martins Dukurs; Latvia	1:37.95 (49.13 / 48.82)	Axel Jungk; Germany	1:38.07 (49.34 / 48.73)
(Canada) Whistler	Yun Sung-bin; South Korea	1:44.34 (51.99 / 52.35)	Nikita Tregubov; Russia	1:45.09 (52.43 / 52.66)	Tomass Dukurs; Latvia	1:45.33 (52.64 / 52.69)
(Germany) Winterberg	Yun Sung-bin; South Korea	56.62	Martins Dukurs; Latvia	56.68	Dave Greszczyszyn; Canada	56.88
(Austria) Igls	Martins Dukurs; Latvia	1:46.03 (53.15 / 52.88)	Yun Sung-bin; South Korea	1:46.18 (53.22 / 52.96)	Nikita Tregubov; Russia	1:46.52 (53.31 / 53.21)
(Germany) Altenberg	Yun Sung-bin; South Korea	1:54.28 (57.24 / 57.04)	Alexander Tretiakov; Russia	1:54.67 (57.33 / 57.34)	Christopher Grotheer; Germany	1:55.04 (57.65 / 57.39)
(Switzerland) St. Moritz	Yun Sung-bin; South Korea	2:14.77 (1:07.58 / 1:07.19)	Axel Jungk; Germany	2:15.64 (1:08.07 / 1:07.57)	Alexander Gassner; Germany	2:15.92 (1:08.12 / 1:07.80)
(Germany) Königssee	Axel Jungk; Germany	1:41.61 (51.05 / 50.56)	Martins Dukurs; Latvia	1:41.63 (51.05 /50.58)	Tomass Dukurs; Latvia	1:41.84 (51.17 / 50.67)

=== Women ===
Event:	Gold:	Time	Silver:	Time	Bronze:	Time
(United States) Lake Placid	Janine Flock; Austria	1:50.13 (54.69 / 55.44)	Elisabeth Vathje; Canada	1:50.39 (55.10 / 55.29)	Lizzy Yarnold; Great Britain	1:50.46 (55.35 / 55.11)
(United States) Park City	Elena Nikitina; Russia	1:40.49 (50.33 / 50.16)	Tina Hermann; Germany	1:40.51 (50.29 / 50.22)	Jacqueline Lölling; Germany	1:40.72 (50.48 / 50.24)
(Canada) Whistler	Jacqueline Lölling; Germany	1:48.38 (53.74 / 54.64)	Jane Channell; Canada	1:48.61 (54.03 / 54.58)	Tina Hermann; Germany	1:48.65 (54.25 / 54.40)
(Germany) Winterberg	Jacqueline Lölling; Germany	1:55.86 (57.85 / 58.01)	Elisabeth Vathje; Canada	1:56.10 (58.00 / 58.10)	Elena Nikitina; Russia	1:56.11 (57.85 / 58.26)
(Austria) Igls	Elena Nikitina; Russia	1:48.80 (54.41 / 54.39)	Elisabeth Vathje; Canada	1:49.38 (54.78 / 54.60)	Mirela Rahneva; Canada	1:49.44 (54.98 / 54.46)
(Germany) Altenberg	Jacqueline Lölling; Germany	1:57.74 (58.50 / 59.24)	Tina Hermann; Germany	1:57.87 (58.68 / 59.19)	Anna Fernstädt; Germany	1:58.17 (58.90 / 59.27)
(Switzerland) St. Moritz	Janine Flock; Austria	2:19.44 (1:09.94 / 1:09.50)	Tina Hermann; Germany	2:19.86 (1:10.21 / 1:09.65)	Elisabeth Vathje; Canada	2:19.89 (1:09.96 / 1:09.93)
(Germany) Königssee	Jacqueline Lölling; Germany	1:44.03 (52.14 / 51.89)	Tina Hermann; Germany	1:44.21 (52.06 / 52.15)	Janine Flock; Austria	1:44.30 (52.13 / 52.17)

== Standings ==
=== Men ===
Pos.	Racer	(United States) LPL	(United States) PAC	(Canada) WHI	(Germany) WIN	(Austria) IGL	(Germany) ALT	(Switzerland) STM	(Germany) KON	Points
1	Yun Sung-bin (KOR)	2	1	1	1	2	1	1	–	1545
2	Axel Jungk (GER)	4	3	9	6	4	8	2	1	1507
3	Tomass Dukurs (LAT)	6	4	3	5	6	6	8	3	1464
4	Martins Dukurs (LAT)	1	2	6	2	1	5	DSQ	2	1440
5	Nikita Tregubov (RUS)	5	8	2	14	3	4	6	4	1426
6	Christopher Grotheer (GER)	10	4	4	10	5	3	7	5	1408
7	Alexander Gassner (GER)	18	7	5	16	8	7	3	6	1232
8	Matthew Antoine (USA)	8	12	8	7	9	13	10	9	1184
9	Alexander Tretiakov (RUS)	3	6	–	4	34	2	4	7	1138
10	Matthias Guggenberger (AUT)	9	10	11	13	13	17	16	8	1016
11	Dave Greszczyszyn (CAN)	13	15	7	3	14	10	21	18	990
12	Dominic Parsons (GBR)	12	20	13	9	18	18	4	11	956
13	Kevin Boyer (CAN)	14	14	12	12	20	15	17	13	860
14	Rhys Thornbury (NZL)	23	9	9	22	16	16	12	24	775
15	Vladislav Marchenkov (RUS)	11	26	24	8	12	–	9	17	745
16	John Daly (USA)	17	18	29	10	11	–	14	10	728
17	Greg West (USA)	19	16	26	15	19	22	13	21	622
18	Hiroatsu Takahashi (JPN)	21	22	22	19	17	9	22	22	600
19	Jeremy Rice (GBR)	15	24	23	29	14	–	11	14	583
20	Barrett Martineau (CAN)	16	22	15	28	21	11	–	16	578
21	Ander Mirambell (ESP)	25	16	17	17	23	26	18	–	478
22	Marcus Wyatt (GBR)	–	–	–	–	10	14	20	12	452
23	Geng Wenqiang (CHN)	7	21	21	–	21	23	–	–	404
24	Vladyslav Heraskevych (UKR)	27	13	18	31	27	–	26	15	404
25	Kim Ji-soo (KOR)	–	11	16	–	7	–	–	–	400
26	Alex Hanssen (NOR)	26	31	13	26	28	27	29	20	344
27	Ronald Auderset (SUI)	30	29	28	26	29	20	19	23	324
28	John Farrow (AUS)	20	19	–	20	26	–	23	–	296
29	Riet Graf (SUI)	31	30	25	20	31	21	24	25	275
30	Alexander Auer (AUT)	–	–	–	25	25	–	27	19	186
31	Lee Han-sin (KOR)	–	–	–	18	–	–	15	–	184
32	Jack Thomas (GBR)	28	25	19	33	–	–	–	–	142
33	Joseph Luke Cecchini (ITA)	24	27	30	24	32	–	–	–	142
34	Florian Auer (AUT)	–	–	–	22	24	–	31	26	137
35	Pavel Kulikov (RUS)	–	–	–	–	–	12	–	–	128
36	Nicholas Timmings (AUS)	29	28	20	32	–	–	–	–	120
37	Katsuyuki Miyajima (JPN)	–	–	–	–	–	24	25	–	85
38	Manuel Schwaeizer (ITA)	–	–	–	30	30	25	–	–	80
39	Nathan Crumpton (USA)	–	–	–	–	–	19	–	–	74
40	Kim Jun-hyeon (KOR)	22	–	–	–	–	–	–	–	56
41	Yan Wengang (CHN)	–	–	–	–	–	–	30	27	52
42	Dean Timmings (AUS)	–	–	27	–	33	–	–	–	32
43	Patrick Rooney (CAN)	–	–	–	–	–	–	28	–	28

=== Women ===
Pos.	Racer	(United States) LPL	(United States) PAC	(Canada) WHI	(Germany) WIN	(Austria) IGL	(Germany) ALT	(Switzerland) STM	(Germany) KON	Points
1	Jacqueline Lölling (GER)	8	3	1	1	4	1	6	1	1628
2	Tina Hermann (GER)	10	2	3	5	11	2	2	2	1504
3	Elisabeth Vathje (CAN)	2	6	8	2	2	9	3	9	1470
4	Elena Nikitina (RUS)	4	1	–	3	1	5	7	14	1306
5	Jane Channell (CAN)	6	11	2	6	14	6	14	6	1274
6	Janine Flock (AUT)	1	22	14	11	5	20	1	3	1206
7	Laura Deas (GBR)	5	5	11	7	6	8	12	23	1186
8	Mirela Rahneva (CAN)	7	4	7	4	3	22	4	–	1168
9	Lizzy Yarnold (GBR)	3	8	23	13	16	19	9	4	1044
10	Anna Fernstädt (GER)	–	–	6	9	14	3	5	5	1008
11	Lelde Priedulēna (LAT)	16	18	4	14	9	4	–	7	992
12	Katie Uhlaender (USA)	9	7	9	8	27	–	10	8	968
13	Kim Meylemans (BEL)	12	9	5	10	11	12	17	–	960
14	Kimberley Bos (NED)	12	10	16	24	7	7	20	17	905
15	Kendall Wesenberg (USA)	14	12	15	25	8	23	16	11	826
16	Marina Gilardoni (SUI)	19	26	16	15	13	10	15	10	822
17	Joska Le Conte (NED)	25	14	12	22	22	14	11	12	768
18	Jaclyn Narracott (AUS)	17	15	20	16	21	17	8	21	728
19	Renata Khuzina (RUS)	22	17	13	27	18	13	21	13	678
20	Savannah Graybill (USA)	11	16	18	26	20	21	19	16	648
21	Yulia Kanakina (RUS)	15	20	10	12	–	–	18	15	628
22	Nozomi Komuro (JPN)	18	19	24	18	23	24	22	18	510
23	Takako Oguchi (JPN)	20	24	21	17	26	16	24	20	508
24	Maya Pedersen (NOR)	26	23	22	28	28	15	23	19	426
25	Maria Montejano (ESP)	24	28	27	20	25	–	26	25	289
26	Maria Orlova (RUS)	–	–	–	–	9	11	–	–	288
27	Madelaine Smith (GBR)	–	–	–	–	17	–	13	22	264
28	Ashleigh Fay Pittaway (GBR)	21	21	19	21	–	–	–	–	260
29	Sophia Griebel (GER)	23	13	–	–	–	–	–	–	170
30	Mun Ra-young (KOR)	–	–	25	19	–	–	25	–	154
31	Katie Tannenbaum (VIR)	–	27	26	–	–	–	28	24	141
32	Maria Marinela Mazilu (ROU)	–	–	–	23	23	–	27	–	132
33	Jeong Sophia (KOR)	–	25	–	–	19	–	–	–	114
34	Annie O'Shea (USA)	–	–	–	–	–	18	–	–	80

== Medal table ==
Rank	Nation	Gold	Silver	Bronze	Total
1	Germany	5	5	6	16
2	South Korea	5	2	0	7
3	Latvia	2	3	2	7
4	Russia	2	2	3	7
5	Austria	2	0	1	3
6	Canada	0	4	3	7
7	Great Britain	0	0	1	1
Totals (7 entries)		16	16	16	48
