= IBSF World Championships 2019 – Men =

Men at the IBSF World Championships 2019
- Venue: Whistler Sliding Centre
- Location: Whistler, Canada
- Dates: March 7–8
- Competitors: 35 from 21 nations
- Winning time: 3:28.11

Medalists
gold medal	Martins Dukurs	Latvia
silver medal	Nikita Tregubov	Russia
bronze medal	Yun Sung-bin	South Korea

The Men competition at the IBSF World Championships 2019 was held on March 7 and 8, 2019.

== Results ==
The first two runs were started on March 7 at 09:04 and the last two runs on March 8 at 09:04.

Rank	Bib	Athlete	Country	Run 1	Rank	Run 2	Rank	Run 3	Rank	Run 4	Rank	Total	Behind
1st place, gold medalist(s)	6	Martins Dukurs	Latvia	52.15	1	51.91	1	51.92	1	52.13	1	3:28.11	
2nd place, silver medalist(s)	8	Nikita Tregubov	Russia	52.26	3	52.17	3	52.04	3	52.15	2	3:28.62	+0.51
3rd place, bronze medalist(s)	5	Yun Sung-bin	South Korea	52.34	4	52.49	5	52.01	2	52.15	2	3:28.99	+0.88
4	18	Christopher Grotheer	Germany	52.22	2	52.51	6	52.14	4	52.22	4	3:29.09	+0.98
5	10	Tomass Dukurs	Latvia	52.36	5	52.18	4	52.23	7	52.34	6	3:29.11	+1.00
6	7	Aleksandr Tretyakov	Russia	52.47	6	52.12	2	52.36	11	52.29	5	3:29.24	+1.13
7	25	Alexander Gassner	Germany	52.48	7	52.70	9	52.33	10	52.68	13	3:30.19	+2.08
8	17	Austin Florian	United States	52.64	8	52.85	16	52.17	6	52.56	11	3:30.22	+2.11
9	16	Jung Seung-gi	South Korea	52.78	10	52.68	8	52.32	9	52.54	10	3:30.32	+2.21
10	9	Axel Jungk	Germany	52.78	10	52.84	15	52.31	8	52.46	8	3:30.39	+2.28
11	14	Dave Greszczyszyn	Canada	53.09	17	52.75	11	52.16	5	52.41	7	3:30.41	+2.30
12	11	Marcus Wyatt	Great Britain	52.86	12	52.89	19	52.40	12	52.50	9	3:30.65	+2.54
13	4	Felix Keisinger	Germany	52.74	9	52.80	12	52.67	16	52.67	12	3:30.88	+2.77
14	12	Vladyslav Heraskevych	Ukraine	52.94	15	52.81	13	52.49	13	52.91	18	3:31.15	+3.04
14	22	Kim Ji-soo	South Korea	52.87	13	52.83	14	52.56	15	52.89	17	3:31.15	+3.04
16	19	Greg West	United States	53.11	18	52.74	10	52.78	17	52.73	15	3:31.36	+3.25
17	24	Geng Wenqiang	China	53.04	16	52.61	7	52.51	14	53.21	20	3:31.37	+3.26
18	13	Florian Auer	Austria	52.88	14	52.95	20	52.92	19	52.76	16	3:31.51	+3.40
19	20	Kyle Brown	United States	53.21	20	52.85	16	53.00	20	52.70	14	3:31.76	+3.65
20	23	Yan Wengang	China	53.16	19	52.86	18	52.85	18	53.19	19	3:32.06	+3.95
21	15	Jeremy Rice	Great Britain	53.28	22	53.20	21	53.29	24	Did not advance			
22	2	Brendan Doyle	Ireland	53.48	24	53.22	22	53.11	21	Did not advance			
23	31	Mark Lynch	Canada	53.41	23	53.23	23	53.25	23	Did not advance			
24	21	Vladislav Marchenkov	Russia	53.25	21	53.38	24	53.41	25	Did not advance			
25	29	Joseph Luke Cecchini	Italy	53.57	26	53.56	25	53.13	22	Did not advance			
26	30	Nicholas Timmings	Australia	53.99	29	53.65	26	53.59	27	Did not advance			
27	27	Jack Thomas	Great Britain	53.55	25	53.71	27	54.09	29	Did not advance			
28	26	Ronald Auderset	Switzerland	53.74	27	54.23	30	53.43	26	Did not advance			
29	28	Alexander Henning Hanssen	Norway	53.89	28	54.12	29	53.61	28	Did not advance			
30	34	Joel Seligstein	Israel	54.18	30	53.81	28	54.17	30	Did not advance			
31	33	Jeff Bauer	Luxembourg	54.95	31	54.50	31	54.73	31	Did not advance			
32	35	Bram Zeegers	Netherlands	55.82	32	56.18	32	56.66	32	Did not advance			
33	1	Joe Della Santina	New Zealand	57.54	33	58.09	33	57.34	33	Did not advance			
	36	Reynaldo Sosa	Mexico	58.87	35	59.16	34	Did not start		Did not advance			
	3	Todd Pfalzgraf	Puerto Rico	57.94	34	1:04.72	35	Did not start		Did not advance			
	32	Ander Mirambell	Spain	Did not start						Did not advance			
