= IBSF World Championships 2020 – Men =

Men at the IBSF World Championships 2020
- Venue: Altenberg bobsleigh, luge, and skeleton track
- Location: Altenberg, Germany
- Dates: 27–28 February
- Competitors: 32 from 15 nations
- Winning time: 3:44.81

Medalists
gold medal	Christopher Grotheer	Germany
silver medal	Axel Jungk	Germany
bronze medal	Alexander Gassner	Germany

The Men competition at the IBSF World Championships 2020 was held on 27 and 28 February 2020.

The German skeleton athletes took advantage of their home advantage, and all four German starters placed among the top five. Christopher Grotheer, who did not compete in the World Cup in the 2019/20 season and was only able to compete thanks to Felix Keisinger's Junior World Championship title, was crowned the surprise world champion. Although Axel Jungk had the fastest time in three of four runs, he had to settle for second place. Alexander Gassner secured bronze. For the second time since 1991, all three medalists came from the same country.

== Results ==
The first two runs were held on 27 February at 10:00. The last two runs were held on 28 February at 13:04.

Rank	Bib	Athlete	Country	Run 1	Rank	Run 2	Rank	Run 3	Rank	Run 4	Rank	Total	Behind
1st place, gold medalist(s)	19	Christopher Grotheer	Germany	56.17	2	55.86	1	56.56	4	56.22	5	3:44.81	
2nd place, silver medalist(s)	9	Axel Jungk	Germany	56.15	1	56.23	3	56.41	1	56.04	1	3:44.83	+0.02
3rd place, bronze medalist(s)	8	Alexander Gassner	Germany	56.21	3	55.91	2	56.54	3	56.20	4	3:44.86	+0.05
4	4	Martins Dukurs	Latvia	56.30	4	56.25	4	56.77	6	56.06	2	3:45.38	+0.57
5	6	Felix Keisinger	Germany	56.66	7	56.35	7	56.46	2	56.14	3	3:45.61	+0.80
6	7	Yun Sung-bin	South Korea	56.47	5	56.45	8	56.66	5	56.33	6	3:45.91	+1.10
7	10	Tomass Dukurs	Latvia	56.75	8	56.34	6	56.88	9	56.66	10	3:46.63	+1.82
8	5	Aleksandr Tretyakov	Russia	57.00	12	56.31	5	56.77	6	56.85	12	3:46.93	+2.12
9	13	Nikita Tregubov	Russia	56.90	9	56.49	9	57.18	11	56.51	8	3:47.08	+2.27
10	11	Marcus Wyatt	Great Britain	57.03	13	56.91	13	56.84	8	56.37	7	3:47.15	+2.34
11	17	Yan Wengang	China	56.64	6	57.07	16	57.25	12	56.95	14	3:47.91	+3.10
12	12	Kim Ji-soo	South Korea	56.93	11	56.76	12	57.51	16	57.07	15	3:48.27	+3.46
13	16	Evgeniy Rukosuev	Russia	56.91	10	57.13	19	57.44	14	56.87	13	3:48.35	+3.54
14	18	Vladyslav Heraskevych	Ukraine	57.25	15	57.12	18	57.36	13	56.64	9	3:48.37	+3.56
15	29	Matt Weston	Great Britain	57.26	16	56.66	10	57.72	21	56.82	11	3:48.46	+3.65
16	15	Jung Seung-gi	South Korea	57.31	17	57.01	14	57.17	10	57.34	18	3:48.83	+4.02
17	25	Florian Auer	Austria	57.32	18	56.74	11	57.93	23	57.17	16	3:49.16	+4.35
18	26	Nathan Crumpton	American Samoa	57.93	26	57.05	15	57.46	15	57.17	16	3:49.61	+4.80
19	23	Samuel Maier	Austria	57.40	19	57.39	20	57.60	18	57.46	19	3:49.85	+5.04
20	20	Craig Thompson	Great Britain	57.53	20	57.10	17	57.54	17	58.09	20	3:50.26	+5.45
21	14	Geng Wenqiang	China	57.18	14	57.66	23	57.92	22	Did not advance			
22	24	Austin Florian	United States	57.58	22	57.71	26	57.63	19	Did not advance			
23	1	Dave Greszczyszyn	Canada	57.74	23	57.49	21	57.98	24	Did not advance			
24	22	Chen Wenhao	China	58.45	28	57.66	23	57.66	20	Did not advance			
25	2	Kevin Boyer	Canada	57.79	25	57.69	25	58.40	26	Did not advance			
26	27	Mattia Gaspari	Italy	57.78	24	57.90	27	58.31	25	Did not advance			
27	30	Andrew Blaser	United States	57.54	21	57.58	22	58.94	30	Did not advance			
28	3	Mihail Sebastian Enache	Romania	58.56	29	57.94	28	58.55	28	Did not advance			
29	31	Basil Sieber	Switzerland	59.11	31	58.42	30	58.66	29	Did not advance			
30	28	Samuel Keiser	Switzerland	58.59	30	58.63	31	59.12	31	Did not advance			
31	21	Amedeo Bagnis	Italy	1:00.04	32	58.25	29	58.46	27	Did not advance			
	32	Ander Mirambell	Spain	58.25	27	Did not start				Did not advance			
