= Vladyslav Heraskevych =

Ukrainian skeleton racer (born 1999)

Vladyslav Heraskevych MOL OLY
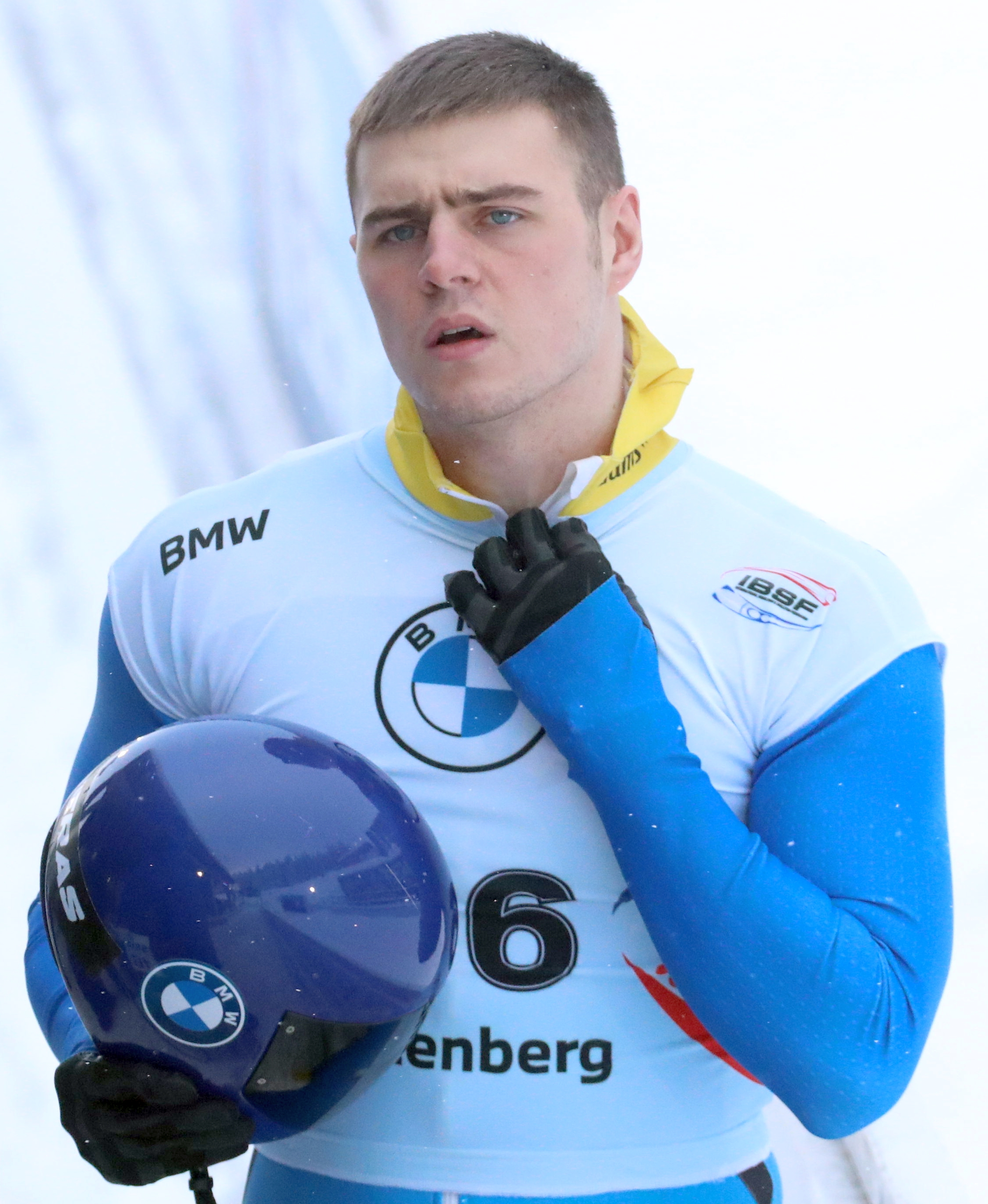
- Heraskevych in 2021

Personal information
- Born: 12 January 1999 (age 27) Kyiv, Ukraine
- Height: 1.86 m (6 ft 1 in)

Sport
- Country: Ukraine
- Sport: Skeleton

Vladyslav Mykhailovych Heraskevych (Ukrainian: Владислав Михайлович Гераскевич; born 12 January 1999) is a Ukrainian skeleton racer who has competed since 2014. He is the first Ukrainian skeleton racer to qualify for the Winter Olympics.

== Career ==
His father, Mykhailo Heraskevych, trains Heraskevych. He began competing in 2014. Previously, he tried boxing.

In February 2016, he participated at 2016 Winter Youth Olympics in Lillehammer, Norway, where he finished 8th. A month earlier, he was 17th at the Junior World Championships in Winterberg, Germany. The following year, he achieved 10th place at the Junior Worlds in Sigulda, Latvia.

On 24 February 2017, he became the first-ever Ukrainian athlete to compete in skeleton at World Championships. He finished 24th at 2017 World Championships in Königssee, Germany.

On 10 November 2017, he debuted in Skeleton World Cup and was 27th in Lake Placid, United States. That season he participated in 7 of 8 races and ranked 24th in World Cup classification.

On 15 January 2018, it was announced that Ukraine received one quota spot for the men's skeleton competition which was the first ever for Ukraine in this sport. At the Olympics, he finished 12th (placing 7th in the final run) in what was regarded in Ukraine as an enormous success. After such a success, Ukrainian Public TV company UA:First started to broadcast Skeleton World Cup for the first time in the history of Ukrainian television.

In the next World Cup season, Heraskevych started very well by finishing 9th in Sigulda, Latvia. But, he wasn't successful at the European Championships, where he failed to qualify for the second run. At the 2019 World Championships, he finished 14th.

Before the Olympic 2021–22 season, Heraskevych showed relatively stable results, reaching twice Top-10 and qualifying for all second runs in the races he took part in. On 31 December 2022, Heraskevych achieved his new World Cup best finish by ranking 6th in Latvian Sigulda.

In 2022, Heraskevych was nominated for his second Winter Games in Beijing. At the Games, he displayed a sign stating "No War in Ukraine" (in reference to the 2021–2022 Russo-Ukrainian crisis), a possible violation of Rule 50 of the Olympic Charter that bans all political displays and demonstrations. The International Olympic Committee (IOC) stated that Heraskevych would not face repercussions for the sign, calling it a "general call for peace". In the competition, he finished in the 18th position.

Four days after the end of the Olympic Games, the 2022 Russian invasion of Ukraine started. Heraskevych helped deliver food and supplies to the Ukrainian people.

Heraskevych was one of Ukraine's flag bearers for the 2026 Winter Olympics' Parade of Nations.

=== 2026 Olympic helmet disqualification ===
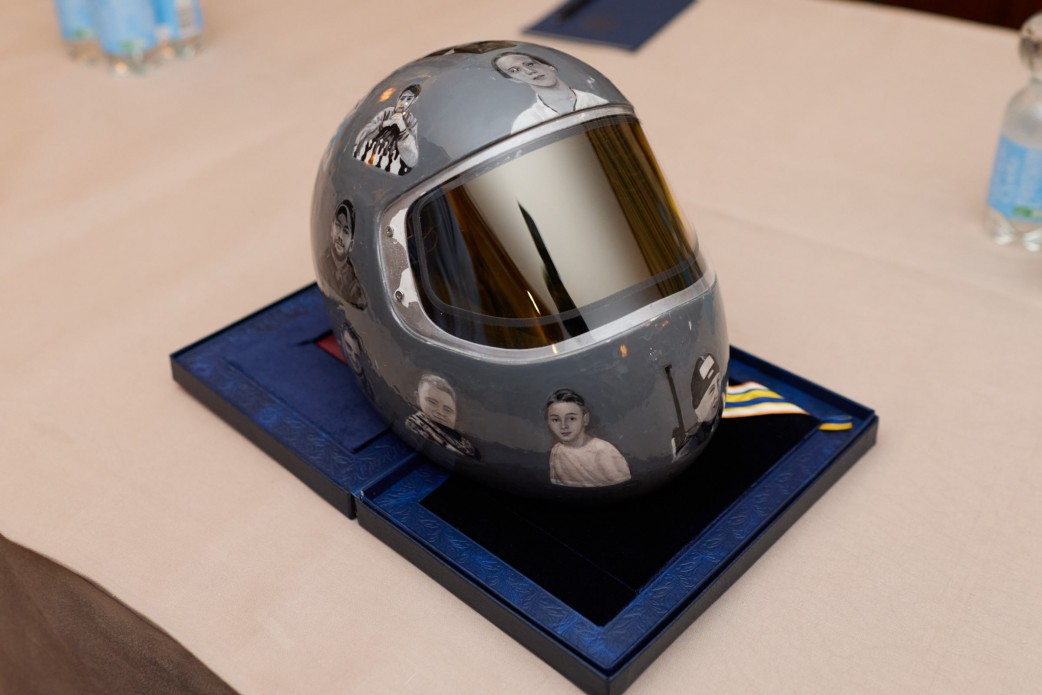
Heraskevych's helmet for the 2026 Olympics

While training for the 2026 Games, Heraskevych wore a "helmet of memory" with 24 images of Ukrainian athletes killed in the Russian invasion. Those depicted included members of the military who were killed in action, such as shooter Oleksiy Habarov and hockey player Oleksiy Loginov, as well as civilians who died in air strikes like weightlifter Alina Perehudova and dancer Daria Kurdel. Dmytro Sharpar, a figure skater and teammate of Heraskevych at the 2016 Winter Youth Olympics, is also shown. The helmet was designed by Ukrainian artist Iryna Prots.

The IOC forbade him from using the helmet in competition, citing Rule 50 of the Olympic Charter, and offered to let him wear a black armband instead. IOC spokesman Mark Adams explained the committee wished to "concentrate on the athletes' performance and sport on the field of play" while separating the Games from "all types of interference". Heraskevych disputed the decision because he did not have time to find a suitable replacement and felt a tribute helmet was not political. He continued to use the helmet in training despite the committee's requests to change it. The National Olympic Committee of Ukraine also submitted a letter of appeal to the IOC.

As the impasse continued, Heraskevych proclaimed he would accept a disqualification rather than wear a black armband because a "medal is worthless in comparison to people's lives and, I believe, in comparison to the memory of these athletes." With no resolution by the day of the competition on 12 February, a jury of the International Bobsleigh and Skeleton Federation ruled to disqualify him from the Games.

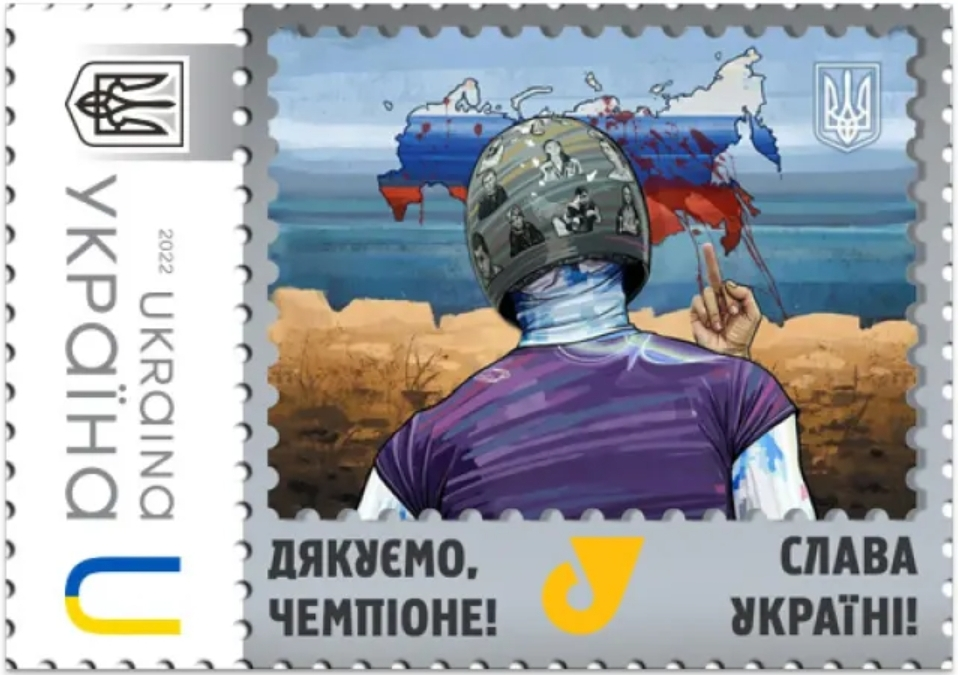
Ukrposhta issued a stamp to thank Heraskevych

Following his disqualification, Heraskevych said that "other athletes in the same situation were able to compete, and they didn't face any sanctions". American figure skater Maxim Naumov had held up a photograph of his parents, who were killed in the 2025 Potomac River mid-air collision, after finishing a performance earlier that week. Adams had previously drawn this comparison, but made the distinction that Naumov's gesture had been after his performance, not during it, saying: "for [the IOC], and for the athletes more importantly, the field of play is sacrosanct."

Ukrainian President Volodymyr Zelenskyy criticised the IOC's ruling as a betrayal of athletes who were part of the Olympic Movement, and stated the "truth cannot be awkward, inappropriate or called political action." Zelenskyy later awarded the Order of Liberty to Heraskevych. "Remembrance is not a violation" became a slogan of solidarity with Heraskevych, which luger Olena Smaha wrote on her glove ahead of her event while Ukrainian troops posted pictures of them holding signs bearing the phrase. Skiers Dmytro Shepiuk and Kateryna Kotsar raised their gloves to show the phrase "UKR heroes with us" and "Freedom of memory" after their respective events; Kotsar had also been ordered to remove a pro-Ukrainian phrase from her helmet. The Ukrainian luge team kneeled and raised their helmets following the team relay.

Heraskevych appealed the verdict to the Court of Arbitration for Sport (CAS), which dismissed the case. In a statement, CAS said the arbitrator considered the limits imposed by the IOC's Athlete Expression Guidelines on athletes' freedom of expression on the field of play "reasonable and proportionate, considering the other opportunities for athletes to raise awareness", and could not override them. Heraskevych's lawyer expressed disappointment at the ruling, saying CAS "upheld the decision that an athlete could be disqualified from the Olympic Games without actual misconduct, without a technical or safety threat, and before the start".

== Personal life ==
Heraskevych graduated from the faculty of physics at the Taras Shevchenko National University of Kyiv.

== Awards and decorations ==
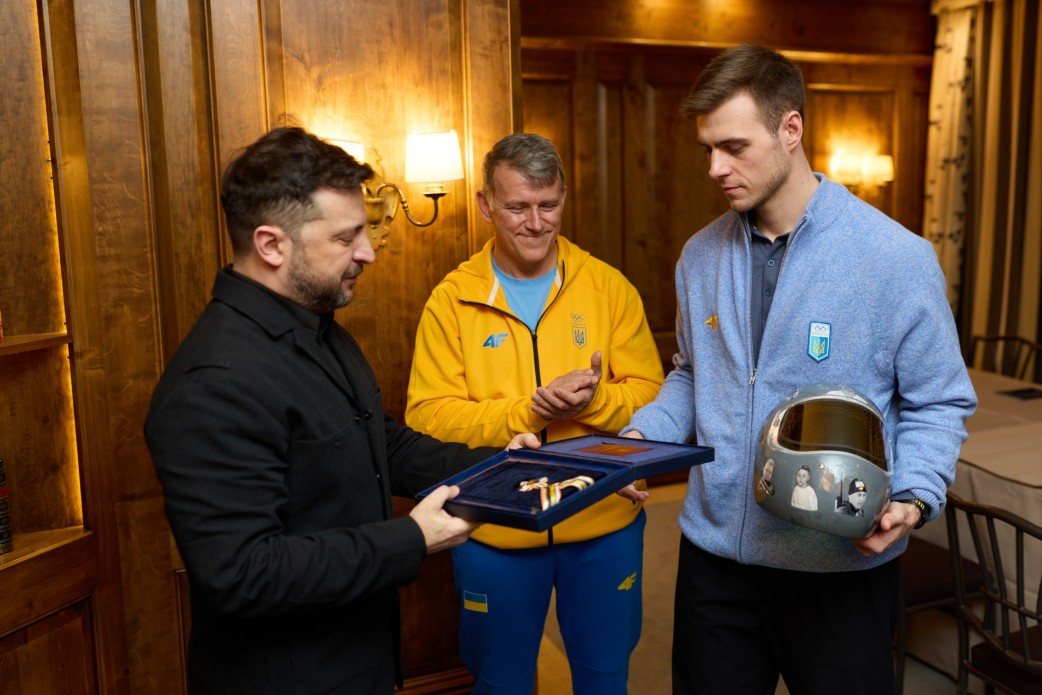
President Volodymyr Zelenskyy presenting Heraskevych with the Order of Liberty

- Order of Liberty (2026)

== Career results ==
=== Winter Olympics ===
Year	Event	Rank
2018	Pyeongchang, South Korea	12
2022	Beijing, China	18
2026	Cortina, Italy	DSQ

=== World Championships ===
Year	Event	Rank
2017	Königssee, Germany	24
2019	Whistler, Canada	14
2020	Altenberg, Germany	14
2021	Altenberg, Germany	13

=== European Championships ===
Year	Event	Rank
2018	Innsbruck, Austria	15
2019	Innsbruck, Austria	15
2020	Sigulda, Latvia	11
2021	Winterberg, Germany	11
2022	St. Moritz, Switzerland	10

=== Skeleton World Cup ===
==== Rankings ====
Season	Rank	Points
2017–18	24	404
2018–19	9	944
2019–20	13	896
2020–21	13	880
2021–22	16	816

==== Results ====
Season	Place	Points	1	2	3	4	5	6	7	8
2017–18	24th	404	LPL; 27	PAC; 13	WHI; 18	WIN; 31	IGL; 27	ALT —	STM; 26	KON; 15
2018–19	9th	944	SIG; 9	WIN; 17	ALT; 14	IGL; 22	STM; 12	LPL; 12	CAL; 12	CAL; 9
2019–20	13th	896	LPL; 12	LPL; 18	WIN; 16	LAP; 8	INS; 17	KON; 11	STM; 16	SIG; 14
2020–21	13th	896	SIG; 12	SIG; 9	INS; 14	INS; 11	WIN; 11	STM; 11	KON —	INS; 18
2021–22	16th	816	INS; 22	INS; 21	ALT; 10	WIN; 19	ALT; 12	SIG; 6	WIN; 25	STM; 11

== See also ==
- List of Ukrainian sports figures killed during the Russo-Ukrainian war
- Kateryna Kotsar, Ukrainian freestyle skier and 2026 Olympian who had to change her helmet with a pro-Ukrainian phrase
- Oleh Handei, Ukrainian speed skater and 2026 Olympian who was barred from wearing a helmet with a purportedly political slogan
