= IBSF World Championships 2021 – Men =

Men at the IBSF World Championships 2021
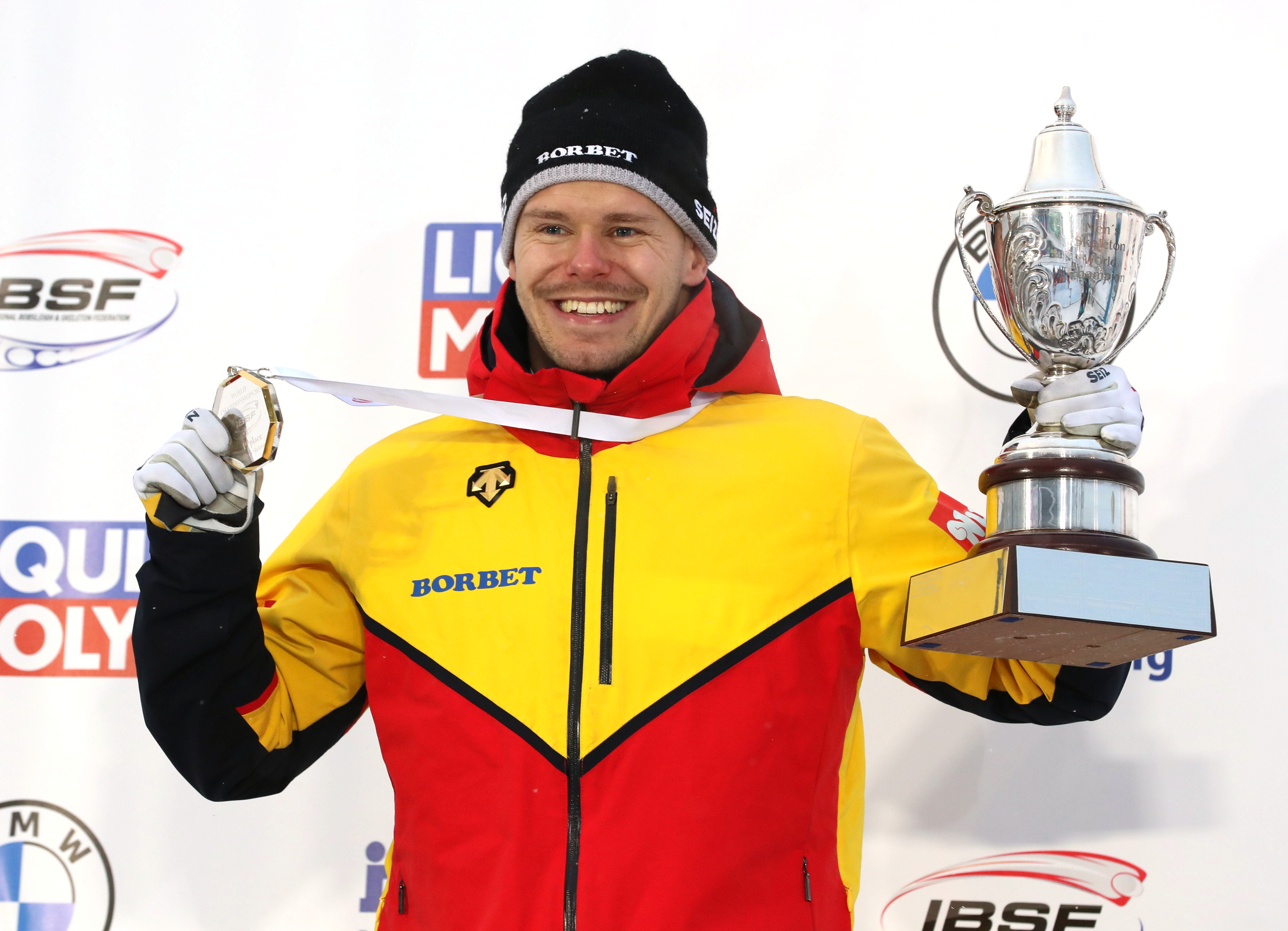
- Men's Skeleton Medal Ceremony (Bobsleigh & Skeleton World Championships Altenberg 2021)
- Venue: Altenberg bobsleigh, luge, and skeleton track
- Location: Altenberg, Germany
- Dates: 11–12 February
- Competitors: 32 from 17 nations
- Winning time: 3:46.31

Medalists
| gold medal | Christopher Grotheer | Germany |
| silver medal | Aleksandr Tretyakov |
| bronze medal | Alexander Gassner | Germany |

The Men competition at the IBSF World Championships 2021 was held on 11 and 12 February 2021.

== Results ==
The first two runs were started on 11 February at 13:04 and the last two runs on 12 February at 13:04.

| Rank | Bib | Athlete | Country | Run 1 | Rank | Run 2 | Rank | Run 3 | Rank | Run 4 | Rank | Total | Behind |
|---|---|---|---|---|---|---|---|---|---|---|---|---|---|
| 1st place, gold medalist(s) | 5 | Christopher Grotheer | Germany | 56.74 | 3 | 56.62 | 1 | 56.36 | 1 | 56.59 | 1 | 3:46.31 | — |
| 2nd place, silver medalist(s) | 6 | Aleksandr Tretyakov | Bobsleigh Federation of Russia | 56.58 | 1 | 56.72 | 3 | 56.63 | 2 | 56.66 | 2 | 3:46.59 | +0.28 |
| 3rd place, bronze medalist(s) | 4 | Alexander Gassner | Germany | 56.95 | 4 | 57.01 | 6 | 56.84 | 3 | 56.71 | 3 | 3:47.51 | +1.20 |
| 4 | 8 | Felix Keisinger | Germany | 56.65 | 2 | 56.69 | 2 | 57.02 | 5 | 57.38 | 9 | 3:47.74 | +1.43 |
| 5 | 24 | Evgeniy Rukosuev | Bobsleigh Federation of Russia | 57.04 | 7 | 56.75 | 4 | 56.89 | 4 | 57.11 | 4 | 3:47.79 | +1.48 |
| 6 | 9 | Nikita Tregubov | Bobsleigh Federation of Russia | 57.24 | 8 | 56.97 | 5 | 57.29 | 7 | 57.52 | 12 | 3:49.02 | +2.71 |
| 7 | 10 | Tomass Dukurs | Latvia | 57.03 | 5 | 57.34 | 10 | 57.34 | 8 | 57.42 | 10 | 3:49.13 | +2.82 |
| 8 | 26 | Amedeo Bagnis | Italy | 57.42 | 10 | 57.49 | 12 | 57.26 | 6 | 57.32 | 7 | 3:49.49 | +3.18 |
| 9 | 14 | Florian Auer | Austria | 57.62 | 15 | 57.39 | 11 | 57.45 | 11 | 57.28 | 6 | 3:49.74 | +3.43 |
| 10 | 18 | Mattia Gaspari | Italy | 57.52 | 13 | 57.24 | 8 | 57.51 | 13 | 57.56 | 13 | 3:49.83 | +3.52 |
| 11 | 17 | Samuel Maier | Austria | 57.25 | 9 | 57.57 | 14 | 57.54 | 14 | 57.76 | 15 | 3:50.12 | +3.81 |
| 12 | 11 | Marcus Wyatt | Great Britain | 58.03 | 20 | 57.88 | 20 | 57.35 | 9 | 57.23 | 5 | 3:50.49 | +4.18 |
| 13 | 16 | Vladyslav Heraskevych | Ukraine | 57.58 | 14 | 57.95 | 21 | 57.60 | 15 | 57.44 | 11 | 3:50.57 | +4.26 |
| 14 | 15 | Craig Thompson | Great Britain | 57.98 | 19 | 57.79 | 18 | 57.50 | 12 | 57.33 | 8 | 3:50.60 | +4.29 |
| 15 | 21 | Austin Florian | United States | 57.48 | 12 | 57.30 | 9 | 58.18 | 21 | 57.71 | 14 | 3:50.67 | +4.36 |
| 16 | 7 | Martins Dukurs | Latvia | 57.43 | 11 | 57.70 | 17 | 57.65 | 16 | 57.91 | 17 | 3:50.69 | +4.38 |
| 17 | 20 | Yun Sung-bin | South Korea | 57.94 | 18 | 57.56 | 13 | 57.41 | 10 | 58.06 | 18 | 3:50.97 | +4.66 |
| 18 | 19 | Ronald Auderset | Switzerland | 57.73 | 17 | 57.60 | 15 | 57.96 | 18 | 57.82 | 16 | 3:51.11 | +4.80 |
| 19 | 12 | Daniil Romanov | Bobsleigh Federation of Russia | 58.70 | 23 | 57.69 | 16 | 57.73 | 17 | 58.15 | 20 | 3:52.27 | +5.96 |
| 20 | 23 | Jung Seung-gi | South Korea | 58.75 | 25 | 57.83 | 19 | 58.45 | 23 | 58.10 | 19 | 3:53.13 | +6.82 |
| 21 | 28 | Mark Lynch | Canada | 57.62 | 15 | 59.49 | 30 | 58.01 | 19 | Did not advance | | | |
| 22 | 2 | Nathan Crumpton | American Samoa | 58.71 | 24 | 58.64 | 24 | 58.11 | 20 | Did not advance | | | |
| 23 | 13 | Matt Weston | Great Britain | 57.03 | 5 | 57.10 | 7 | 1:01.36 | 32 | Did not advance | | | |
| 24 | 22 | Kim Ji-soo | South Korea | 58.64 | 22 | 58.22 | 22 | 58.68 | 25 | Did not advance | | | |
| 25 | 32 | Nicholas Timmings | Australia | 58.55 | 21 | 58.67 | 25 | 58.40 | 22 | Did not advance | | | |
| 26 | 3 | Basil Sieber | Switzerland | 58.78 | 26 | 58.60 | 23 | 58.86 | 27 | Did not advance | | | |
| 27 | 29 | Kyle Murray | Canada | 59.04 | 28 | 58.95 | 27 | 58.55 | 24 | Did not advance | | | |
| 28 | 27 | Mihai Păcioianu | Romania | 59.31 | 29 | 58.83 | 26 | 58.77 | 26 | Did not advance | | | |
| 29 | 1 | Austin McCrary | United States | 58.90 | 27 | 59.18 | 28 | 59.12 | 28 | Did not advance | | | |
| 30 | 31 | Colin Freeling | Belgium | 59.69 | 30 | 59.39 | 29 | 59.57 | 29 | Did not advance | | | |
| 31 | 30 | Jeff Bauer | Luxembourg | 59.97 | 31 | 1:00.54 | 32 | 1:00.20 | 31 | Did not advance | | | |
| 32 | 33 | Akwasi Frimpong | Ghana | 1:00.75 | 32 | 1:00.42 | 31 | 1:00.11 | 30 | Did not advance | | | |
| | 25 | Ander Mirambell | Spain | Did not start | | | | | | | | | |
