= Ashleigh Fay Pittaway =

German-British skeleton racer

Ashleigh Pittaway
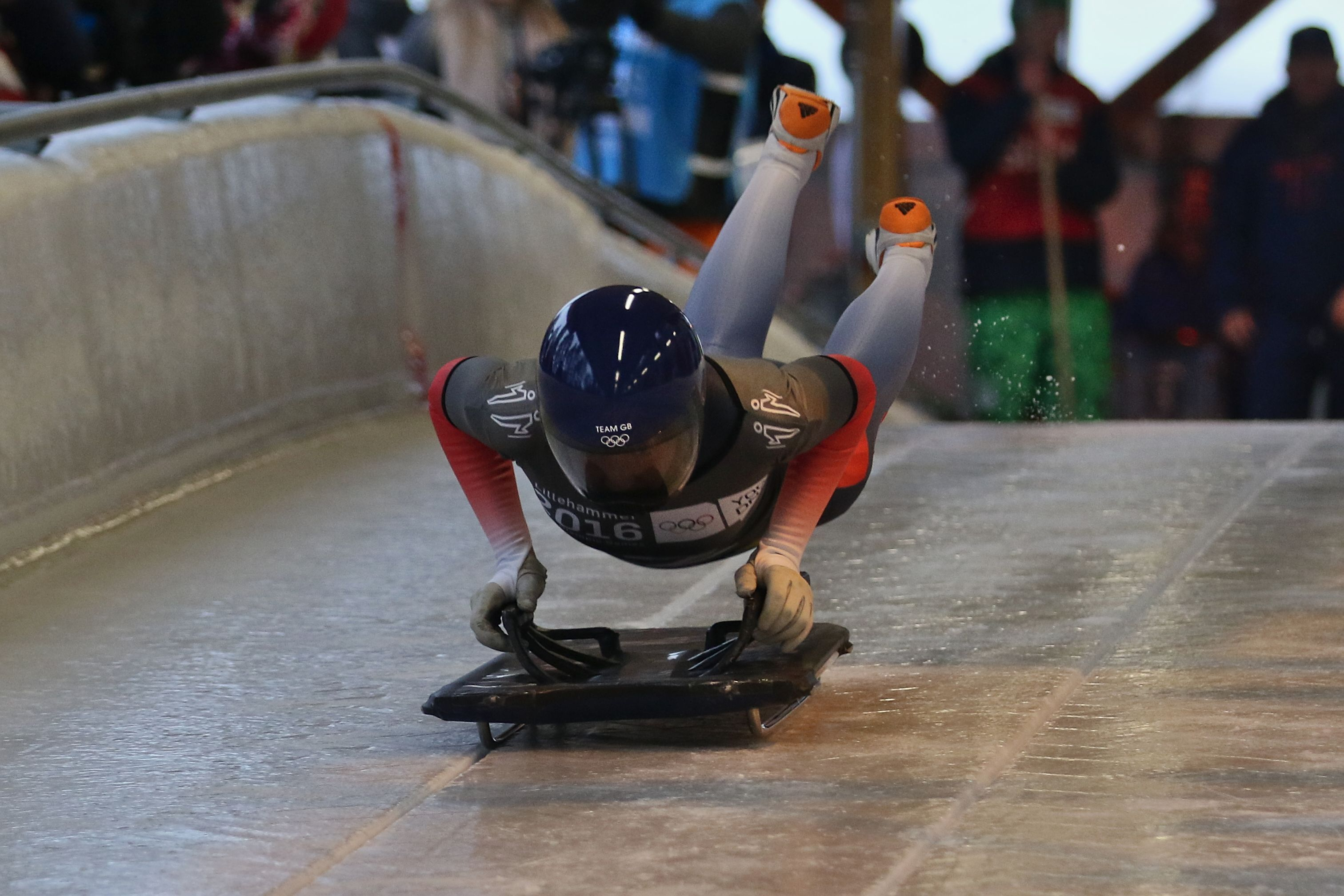
- Pittaway at the 2016 Winter Youth Olympics

Personal information
- Full name: Ashleigh Fay Pittaway
- Nationality: German and British
- Born: 23 May 2000 (age 26) Munich, Germany
- Height: 173 cm (5 ft 8 in)
- Weight: 67 kg (148 lb)

Sport
- Country: Great Britain
- Sport: Skeleton
- Coached by: Danny Holdcroft
Medal record
Youth Olympic Games
| Gold medal – first place | 2016 Lillehammer | Girls |
World Junior Championships
| Bronze medal – third place | 2019 Königssee |
| Bronze medal – third place | 2021 St. Moritz |

Ashleigh Fay Pittaway (born 23 May 2000 in Munich) is a former German-British skeleton racer who competed on the Skeleton World Cup and Europe Cup circuits. She started racing in 2011 in Germany while a student, and joined the national team in 2015. Her personal coach was Danny Holdcroft, and she used a BlackRoc sled. She won a gold medal in the 2016 Winter Youth Olympics in Lillehammer. She also made her World Cup debut in 2016, at Königssee, where she finished 15th. She retired from competitive racing in September 2021, ahead of the 2022 Winter Olympics.

== World Cup results ==
All results are sourced from the International Bobsleigh and Skeleton Federation (IBSF).

| Season | 1 | 2 | 3 | 4 | 5 | 6 | 7 | 8 | Points | Place |
|---|---|---|---|---|---|---|---|---|---|---|
| 2015–16 | – | – | – | – | – | – | – | 15 | 104 | 27th |
| 2016–17 | Didn't compete at the World Cup | | | | | | | | – | – |
| 2017–18 | 21 | 21 | 19 | 21 | – | – | – | – | 260 | 28th |
| 2018–19 | – | – | – | – | – | 9 | – | 16 | 248 | 20th |
| 2019–20 | – | – | 14 | – | – | – | – | – | 112 | 29th |
| 2020–21 | 12 | 8 | – | – | 15 | 12 | – | 10 | 664 | 16th |
