= Elena Nikitina =

Russian skeleton racer

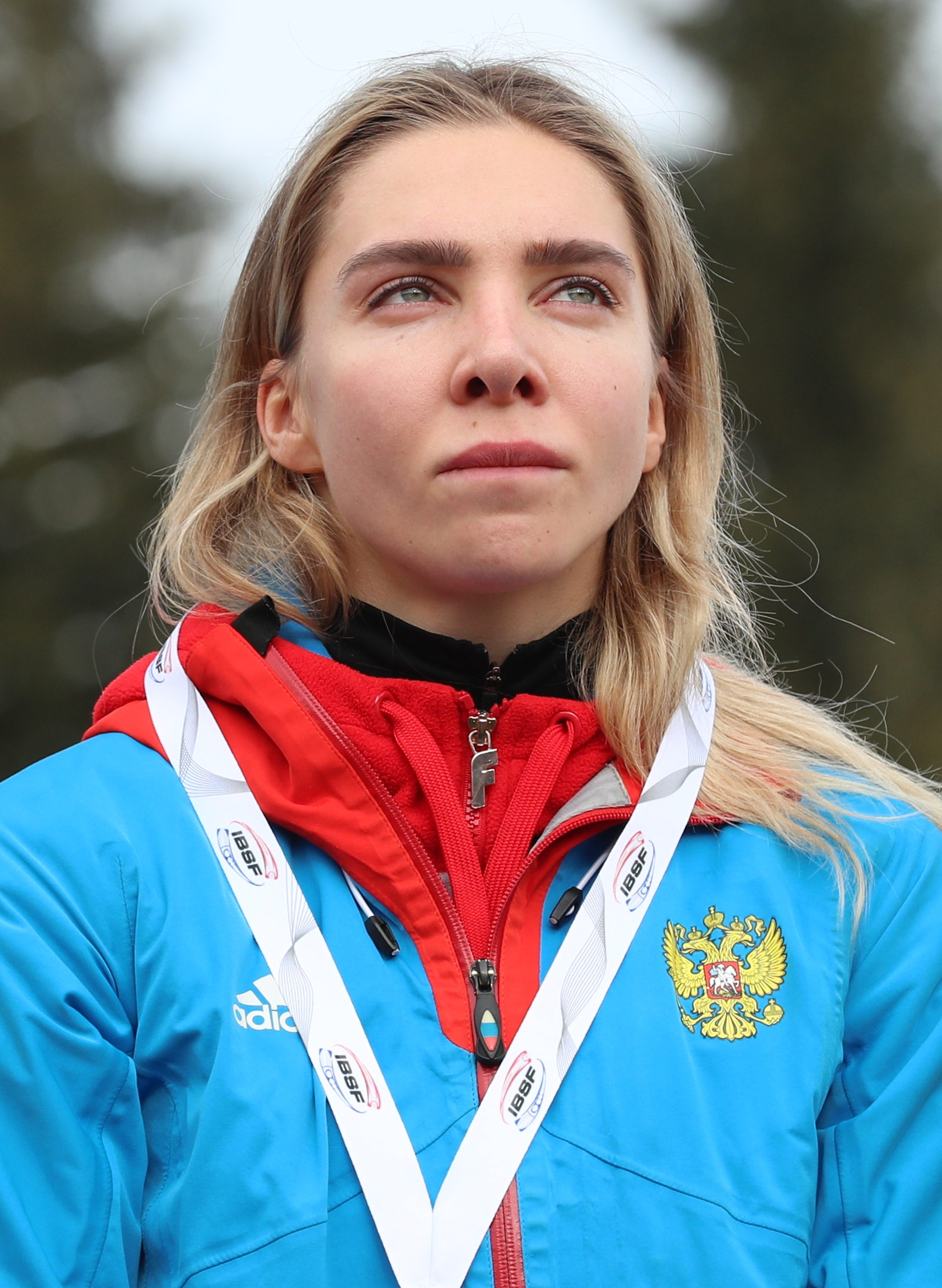
- Nikitina 2020 in Altenberg, Saxony, Germany

Personal information
- Full name: Elena Valeryevna Nikitina
- Nationality: Russian
- Born: 2 October 1992 (age 33) Moscow, Russia
- Height: 1.67 m (5 ft 6 in)
- Weight: 55 kg (121 lb)

Sport
- Country: Russia
- Sport: Skeleton

Achievements and titles
- Highest world ranking: 1st in Skeleton World Cup (2018–19)
Medal record
Representing Russia
Olympic Games
Bronze medal – third place	2014 Sochi	Women
World Championships
Bronze medal – third place	2016 Igls	Women
Junior World Championships
Gold medal – first place	2013 Igls	Women
European Championships
Gold medal – first place	2013 Igls	Women
Gold medal – first place	2018 Igls	Women
Gold medal – first place	2020 Sigulda	Women
Gold medal – first place	2021 Winterberg	Women
Silver medal – second place	2019 Igls	Women
Representing Bobsleigh Federation of Russia
World Championships
Bronze medal – third place	2021 Altenberg	Women
Bronze medal – third place	2021 Altenberg	Mixed team

Elena Valeryevna Nikitina (Russian: Елена Валерьевна Никитина; born 2 October 1992) is a Russian skeleton racer who joined the national squad in 2009. She rides a Schneider sled, and her coach is Denis Alimov. Before starting skeleton, she was an association football player.

== Career ==
Nikitina began international competition in the 2010–11 season of the Europe Cup and Intercontinental Cup. She competed in her first Junior World Championships at Igls in 2012, where she finished in 8th place. Her first podium finish was recorded at the following Junior Worlds (also at Igls), which she won by a tenth of a second over Sophia Griebel. Nikitina finished 12th in her first World Cup race, at Königssee in 2013, but went on to win the following week at Igls, 0.27-second ahead of Noelle Pikus-Pace. Later that month, she came in 15th at her first senior World Championships, at St. Moritz.

In the Olympic season of 2013–14, Nikitina recorded silver-medal performances at Park City and Calgary, which she followed up with a bronze at the 2014 Winter Olympics – from which she was later disqualified. She continued to race on the Intercontinental and World Cup circuits, recording only one World Cup podium finish in 2014–15, at Altenberg, and no podiums in 2015–16 until she won a bronze at the 2016 World Championships. (She also took home a silver in the combined bobsled-skeleton mixed team race at the same championships.)

Nikitina raced at the 2016–17 season finale and Olympic test event in Pyeongchang in 2017, earning a silver medal and setting a women's skeleton start record for the newly constructed track, 4.92 seconds. In the 2017–18 World Cup season, she continued to post record start times (at both Lake Placid and Park City) on her way to gold medals at Park City and Igls (the latter also being the European Championship) and a bronze at Winterberg.

Nikitina became the first Russian woman and second Russian overall to win the Large Crystal Globe in the 2018–19 season.

She won three races in the 2019/2020 season, securing third place in the overall ranking. In the following season, although winning thrice and finishing in second place once, she was placed 6th at the end of the season after deciding to skip two stages: the Innsbruck 2 stage, for the practice of the future European Championships and the St. Moritz stage, for the participation at the Intercontinental Cup.

== Doping allegations ==
Nikitina was selected to represent Russia at the 2014 Winter Olympics in Sochi. In the first run, she set the start record on the way to a bronze-medal finish. On 22 December 2016, the International Olympic Committee (IOC) notified the International Bobsleigh and Skeleton Federation (IBSF), the sport's governing body, that it had opened an investigation into alleged doping violations by the Russian team at the Sochi games, the IBSF responded by issuing a provisional suspension to four athletes, including Nikitina. After a hearing on 3 January 2017, the IBSF lifted the provisional ban, allowing the athletes to compete for the remainder of the 2016–17 season.

On 22 November 2017, Nikitina was disqualified of her Olympic bronze medal and given a lifetime ban from Olympic competition. Nikitina and several others were again provisionally suspended by the IBSF in accordance with this decision, but a hearing panel ruled that the suspension could not be maintained until the IBSF receives and evaluates the formal record of decision from the IOC, so she was reinstated on 1 December 2017, having missed a World Cup race at Whistler. Nikitina and 21 other sanctioned Russian athletes appealed the IOC decision to the Court of Arbitration for Sport on 6 December; a consolidated hearing for all the sanctioned Russian athletes was held the week of 22 January. An unrelated appeal to the CAS by the IBSF to restore the provisional ban overturned by the IBSF's own hearing panel was dismissed for lack of jurisdiction.

The CAS arbitrators ruled on 1 February 2018 that there was not sufficient, individualized evidence of anti-doping rule violations to sanction Nikitina and 27 other athletes, ordering that her Sochi bronze medal be reinstated and reversing the ban on Olympic participation while upholding sanctions on a number of others. The IOC said that it would consider appealing to the Swiss Federal Tribunal, which hears appeals from the CAS. Because the Russian Olympic Committee as a whole had been suspended from the Olympic movement, Nikitina and other Russian athletes could only participate in the 2018 Winter Olympics if issued a formal invitation by the IOC, but the IOC did not invite any Russian women skeleton athletes (the invitations were actually issued before the CAS handed down its ruling) and the Russian quota spots were reassigned to other countries. The athletes appealed their non-invitation before the CAS's Ad-hoc Division at the games, but the panel determined that not being invited to the Olympics did not constitute a sanction against them, but rather a special benefit conferred on those who were invited, and thus the IOC had not abused its discretion or flouted the CAS decision overturning the previous sanctions.

== World Cup results ==
All results are sourced from the International Bobsleigh and Skeleton Federation (IBSF).

Season	1	2	3	4	5	6	7	8	9	Points	Place
2012–13	LKP —	PKC —	WHI —	WIN; 10	LPL —	ALT —	KON; 12	IGL; 1	SOC; 5	681	18th
2013–14	CAL; 2	PKC; 6	LKP1; 22	LKP2; 20	WIN; 11	STM; 14	IGL; 6	KON —	—N/a	934	13th
2014–15	LKP —	CAL —	ALT —	KON; 3	STM; 17	IGL1; 12	IGL2; 9	SOC —	—N/a	696	17th
2015–16	ALT; 6	WIN; 13	KON1; 12	LKP —	PKC —	WHI —	STM; 12	KON2 —	—N/a	552	18th
2016–17	WHI; 17	LKP; 18	ALT —	WIN; 18	STM; 20	KON; 16	IGL; 4	PYE; 2	—N/a	814	14th
2017–18	LKP; 4	PKC; 1	WHI —	WIN; 3	IGL; 1	ALT; 5	STM; 7	KON; 14	—N/a	1306	4th
2018–19	SIG; 1	WIN; 4	ALT; 1	KON; CNX	IGL; 2	STM; 2	LKP; 1	CAL1; 4	CAL2; 5	1663	1st
2019–20	LKP1; 5	LKP2; 1	WIN; 8	LPL; 1	IGL; 4	KON; 3	STM; 5	SIG; 1	—N/a	1595	3rd
2020–21	SIG 1; 9	SIG 2; 2	IGL 1; 1	IGL 2 —	WIN; 1	STM —	KON; 5	IGL 3; 1	—N/a	1221	6th
2021–22	IGL 1; 1	IGL 2; 1	ALT 1; 11	WIN; 6	ALT 2; 6	SIG; 5	WIN 2; 3	STM; 11	—N/a	1458	3rd
