= 2019–20 Skeleton World Cup =

Winners
- Men's: Martins Dukurs (LAT)
- Women's: Jacqueline Lölling (GER)

Competitions
- Venues: 7 (8 events)

The 2019–20 Skeleton World Cup was a multi-race series over a season for skeleton. The season started on 7 December in Lake Placid, US and finished on 16 February 2020 in Sigulda, Latvia. The World Cup was organised by the International Bobsleigh and Skeleton Federation, who also run World Cups and Championships in bobsleigh. The title sponsor of the World Cup was again BMW.

== Calendar ==
The first race weekend of the season was originally scheduled to be at Park City, but due to a problem with the refrigeration system there, the races were relocated to Lake Placid.

Anticipated schedule as announced by the IBSF:

Venue	Date	Details
(United States) Lake Placid	07.12-08.12	
(United States) Lake Placid	13.12	
(Germany) Winterberg	05.01	
(France) La Plagne	10.01	
(Austria) Igls	17.01	
(Germany) Königssee	24.01	
(Switzerland) St. Moritz	31.01	
(Latvia) Sigulda	15.02-16.02	European Championships
(Germany) Altenberg	21.02-01.03	World Championships

== Results ==
=== Men ===
Event:	Gold:	Time	Silver:	Time	Bronze:	Time
(United States) Lake Placid 1	Axel Jungk; Germany	1:46.32 (53.12 / 53.20)	Martins Dukurs; Latvia	1:46.44 (53.14 / 53.30)	Alexander Tretiakov; Russia	1:46.71 (53.17 / 53.54)
(United States) Lake Placid 2	Alexander Tretiakov; Russia	1:46.55 (52.87 / 53.68)	Martins Dukurs; Latvia	1:46.59 (52.90 / 53.69)	Felix Keisinger; Germany	1:46.97 (53.25 / 53.72)
(Germany) Winterberg	Yun Sung-bin; South Korea	1:52.95 (56.36 / 56.59)	Alexander Gassner; Germany	1:53.00 (56.62 / 56.38)	Axel Jungk; Germany	1:53.03 (56.63 / 56.40)
(France) La Plagne	Alexander Tretiakov; Russia	1:58.90 (59.28 / 59.62)	Martins Dukurs; Latvia	1:59.27 (59.60 / 59.67)	Geng Wenqiang; China	2:00.29 (1:00.07 / 1:00.22)
(France) La Plagne	Alexander Tretiakov; Russia	1:58.90 (59.28 / 59.62)	Martins Dukurs; Latvia	1:59.27 (59.60 / 59.67)	Yun Sung-bin; South Korea	2:00.29 (1:00.07 / 1:00.22)
(Austria) Igls	Martins Dukurs; Latvia	1:44.50 (52.34 / 52.16)	Yun Sung-bin; South Korea	1:44.92 (52.66 / 52.26)	Alexander Tretiakov; Russia	1:44.94 (52.53 / 52.41)
(Germany) Königssee	Alexander Tretiakov; Russia	1:40.27 (50.15 / 50.12)	Yun Sung-bin; South Korea	1:40.33 (49.98 / 50.35)	Felix Keisinger; Germany	1:40.66 (50.62 / 50.04)
(Switzerland) St. Moritz	Martins Dukurs; Latvia	2:15.89 (1:07.73 / 1:08.16)	Felix Keisinger; Germany	2:16.20 (1:07.98 / 1:08.22)	Axel Jungk; Germany	2:16.23 (1:07.79 / 1:08.44)
(Latvia) Sigulda	Martins Dukurs; Latvia	1:40.09 (50.15 / 49.94)	Tomass Dukurs; Latvia	1:40.90 (50.54 / 50.36)	Yun Sung-bin; South Korea	1:41.15 (50.36 / 50.79)

=== Women ===
Event:	Gold:	Time	Silver:	Time	Bronze:	Time
(United States) Lake Placid 1	Jacqueline Lölling; Germany	1:49.76 (54.79 / 54.97)	Janine Flock; Austria	1:50.00 (54.99 / 55.01)	Tina Hermann; Germany	1:50.47 (55.11 / 55.36)
(United States) Lake Placid 2	Elena Nikitina; Russia	1:49.93 (54.76 / 55.17)	Jacqueline Lölling; Germany	1:51.05 (55.23 / 55.82)	Janine Flock; Austria	1:51.11 (55.54 / 55.57)
(Germany) Winterberg	Tina Hermann; Germany	1:56.21 (58.10 / 58.11)	Mirela Rahneva; Canada	1:56.24 (58.23 / 58.01)	Janine Flock; Austria	1:56.37 (58.21 / 58.16)
(France) La Plagne	Elena Nikitina; Russia	2:02.72 (1:01.37 / 1:01.35)	Janine Flock; Austria	2:03.37 (1:01.49 / 1:01.88)	Jacqueline Lölling; Germany	2:03.58 (1:01.76 / 1:01.82)
(Austria) Igls	Jacqueline Lölling; Germany	1:47.44 (53.82 / 53.62)	Janine Flock; Austria	1:47.46 (53.77 / 53.69)	Megan Henry; United States	1:47.70 (53.80 / 53.90)
(Germany) Königssee	Tina Hermann; Germany	1:42.79 (51.55 / 51.24)	Jacqueline Lölling; Germany	1:42.97 (51.64 / 51.33)	Elena Nikitina; Russia	1:43.20 (51.61 / 51.59)
(Switzerland) St. Moritz	Tina Hermann; Germany	2:19.87 (1:10.05 / 1:09.82)	Jacqueline Lölling; Germany	2:20.28 (1:10.24 / 1:10.04)	Janine Flock; Austria	2:20.60 (1:10.25 / 1:10.35)
(Latvia) Sigulda	Elena Nikitina; Russia	1:43.87 (51.85 / 52.02)	Marina Gilardoni; Switzerland	1:44.21 (52.36 / 51.85)	Janine Flock; Austria	1:44.31 (52.29 / 52.02)

== Standings ==
=== Men ===
Pos.	Racer	(United States) LPL 1	(United States) LPL 2	(Germany) WIN	(France) LPG	(Austria) IGL	(Germany) KON	(Switzerland) STM	(Latvia) SIG	Points
1	Martins Dukurs (LAT)	2	2	4	2	1	7	1	1	1665
2	Alexander Tretiakov (RUS)	3	1	7	1	3	1	6	5	1603
3	Yun Sung-bin (KOR)	7	6	1	3	2	2	4	3	1581
4	Felix Keisinger (GER)	5	3	5	7	7	3	2	4	1506
5	Alexander Gassner (GER)	4	9	2	13	10	5	5	6	1362
6	Tomass Dukurs (LAT)	6	5	10	10	12	6	9	2	1314
7	Axel Jungk (GER)	1	4	3	5	14	4	3	–	1305
8	Marcus Wyatt (GBR)	10	8	8	14	4	13	11	8	1184
9	Kim Ji-soo (KOR)	16	10	6	6	5	12	8	21	1116
10	Nikita Tregubov (RUS)	8	7	19	11	13	9	12	7	1106

=== Women ===
Pos.	Racer	(United States) LPL 1	(United States) LPL 2	(Germany) WIN	(France) LPG	(Austria) IGL	(Germany) KON	(Switzerland) STM	(Latvia) SIG	Points
1	Jacqueline Lölling (GER)	1	2	4	3	1	2	2	8	1632
2	Janine Flock (AUT)	2	3	3	2	2	5	3	3	1614
3	Elena Nikitina (RUS)	5	1	8	1	4	3	5	1	1595
4	Tina Hermann (GER)	3	6	1	5	5	1	1	15	1523
5	Mirela Rahneva (CAN)	4	4	2	7	7	4	4	21	1376
6	Marina Gilardoni (SUI)	9	11	5	4	10	11	6	2	1330
7	Kim Meylemans (BEL)	8	8	10	9	12	10	9	5	1224
8	Megan Henry (USA)	12	13	7	11	3	6	13	17	1136
9	Anna Fernstädtová (CZE)	7	7	11	13	20	8	11	12	1084
10	Sophia Griebel (GER)	14	15	9	6	–	7	7	7	1048

== Medal table ==
Rank	Nation	Gold	Silver	Bronze	Total
1	Germany	6	5	6	17
2	Russia	6	0	3	9
3	Latvia	3	4	0	7
4	South Korea	1	2	2	5
5	Austria	0	3	4	7
6	Canada	0	1	0	1
6	Switzerland	0	1	0	1
8	China	0	0	1	1
8	United States	0	0	1	1
Totals (9 entries)		16	16	17	49
