= Jeong Sophia =

South Korean skeleton racer

Sophia Jeong
Personal information
- Nationality: South Korean
- Born: 18 August 1993 (age 31)
- Height: 167 cm (5 ft 6 in)
- Weight: 54 kg (119 lb)

Sport
- Country: South Korea
- Sport: Skeleton
- Coached by: Jinho Song

Achievements and titles
- Olympic finals: 15th (Pyeongchang 2018)

Jeong Sophia (Korean: 정소피아; born 18 August 1993) is a South Korean skeleton racer who competes on the Skeleton World Cup and lower ranking circuits. She started racing in 2013 and was selected to the Korean national team in 2014. Her personal coach is Jinho Song. Jeong was the first Korean woman to earn a podium in an international skeleton race, with two third-place finishes at a North American Cup at Calgary in November, 2016. She followed that performance the following season with the first ever win by a Korean woman, at Park City. She has competed in four Intercontinental Cup races, all at Calgary. She joined the World Cup for two races in the 2017–18 season, at Park City (25th) and Igls (19th), before heading home to train for the 2018 Winter Olympics, where she received South Korea's automatic entry in the competition as the host country.
