= IBSF World Championships 2016 – Men =

Men's skeleton at the IBSF World Championships 2016
- Venue: Olympic Sliding Centre Innsbruck, Igls
- Date: 18–19 February
- Competitors: 34 from 19 nations
- Winning time: 3:28.84

Medalists
gold medal	Martins Dukurs	Latvia
silver medal	Aleksandr Tretyakov	Russia
silver medal	Yun Sung-bin	South Korea

The Men's skeleton event in the IBSF World Championships 2016 was held on 18 and 19 February 2016.

== Results ==
The first two runs were started on 18 February at 09:19 and the last two runs on 19 February at 15:34.

Rank	Bib	Athlete	Country	Run 1	Run 2	Run 3	Run 4	Total	Behind
1st place, gold medalist(s)	2	Martins Dukurs	Latvia	52.14	52.50	52.11	52.09	3:28.84	
2nd place, silver medalist(s)	5	Aleksandr Tretyakov	Russia	52.49	52.68	52.32	52.48	3:29.97	+1.13
2nd place, silver medalist(s)	3	Yun Sung-bin	South Korea	52.57	52.62	52.37	52.41	3:29.97	+1.13
4	4	Axel Jungk	Germany	52.78	52.71	52.67	52.55	3:30.71	+1.87
5	8	Nikita Tregubov	Russia	52.84	53.00	52.61	52.51	3:30.96	+2.12
6	1	Tomass Dukurs	Latvia	52.90	52.86	52.74	52.72	3:31.22	+2.38
7	14	Kilian von Schleinitz	Germany	53.02	53.01	53.01	52.89	3:31.93	+3.09
8	16	Nathan Crumpton	United States	53.22	53.05	52.87	52.98	3:32.12	+3.28
9	7	Matthew Antoine	United States	53.18	53.19	52.83	53.03	3:32.23	+3.39
10	6	Dominic Parsons	Great Britain	53.12	53.22	53.03	52.88	3:32.29	+3.45
11	9	Michael Zachrau	Germany	53.17	53.16	53.15	52.89	3:32.37	+3.53
12	13	Pavel Kulikov	Russia	53.34	53.13	53.04	53.08	3:32.60	+3.76
13	15	Kyle Brown	United States	53.46	53.12	53.20	52.92	3:32.70	+3.86
14	10	Dave Greszczyszyn	Canada	53.28	53.42	53.04	53.05	3:32.79	+3.95
15	12	Mattia Gaspari	Italy	53.43	53.25	53.20	53.17	3:33.05	+4.21
16	23	David Swift	Great Britain	53.74	53.33	53.03	53.10	3:33.20	+4.36
17	28	Florian Auer	Austria	53.39	53.23	53.46	53.32	3:33.40	+4.56
18	19	Alexander Auer	Austria	53.43	53.60	53.18	53.37	3:33.58	+4.74
19	11	Barrett Martineau	Canada	53.53	53.60	53.33	53.29	3:33.75	+4.91
20	17	Hiroatsu Takahashi	Japan	53.85	53.70	53.13	53.26	3:33.94	+5.10
21	18	Lee Han-sin	South Korea	53.66	53.69	53.37			
22	24	Marco Rohrer	Switzerland	53.66	53.69	53.37			
23	26	Ronald Auderset	Switzerland	53.73	53.78	53.45			
24	20	Rhys Thornbury	New Zealand	53.90	53.57	53.51			
25	21	Alexander Mutovin	Russia	53.54	53.91	53.58			
25	22	Evan Neufeldt	Canada	53.95	53.68	53.40			
27	25	Ander Mirambell	Spain	53.93	54.07	53.37			
28	27	Joseph Luke Cecchini	Italy	54.26	53.98	53.54			
29	29	Philipp Moelter	Czech Republic	54.49	54.49	54.47			
30	30	Dean Timmings	Australia	54.84	55.20	54.62			
31	33	Mihai Păcioianu	Romania	55.48	54.87	54.86			
32	32	Michał Jakóbczyk	Poland	55.14	55.67	54.54			
33	31	Adam Edelman	Israel	55.59	55.49	54.62			
34	34	Denis Lorenčič	Slovenia	56.34	55.66	55.74			
