= Madeline Smith (disambiguation) =

Madeline Smith may refer to:

- Madeline Smith (born 1949), English actress
- Madeline "Maddy" Smith, fictional character in the British TV series, Wolfblood
- Madeleine Smith (1835–1928), alleged murderer
- Madelaine Smith (born 1995), skeleton racer
- Madolyn Smith (fl. 1980s–1990s), American actress
