= Renata Khuzina =

Russian skeleton racer

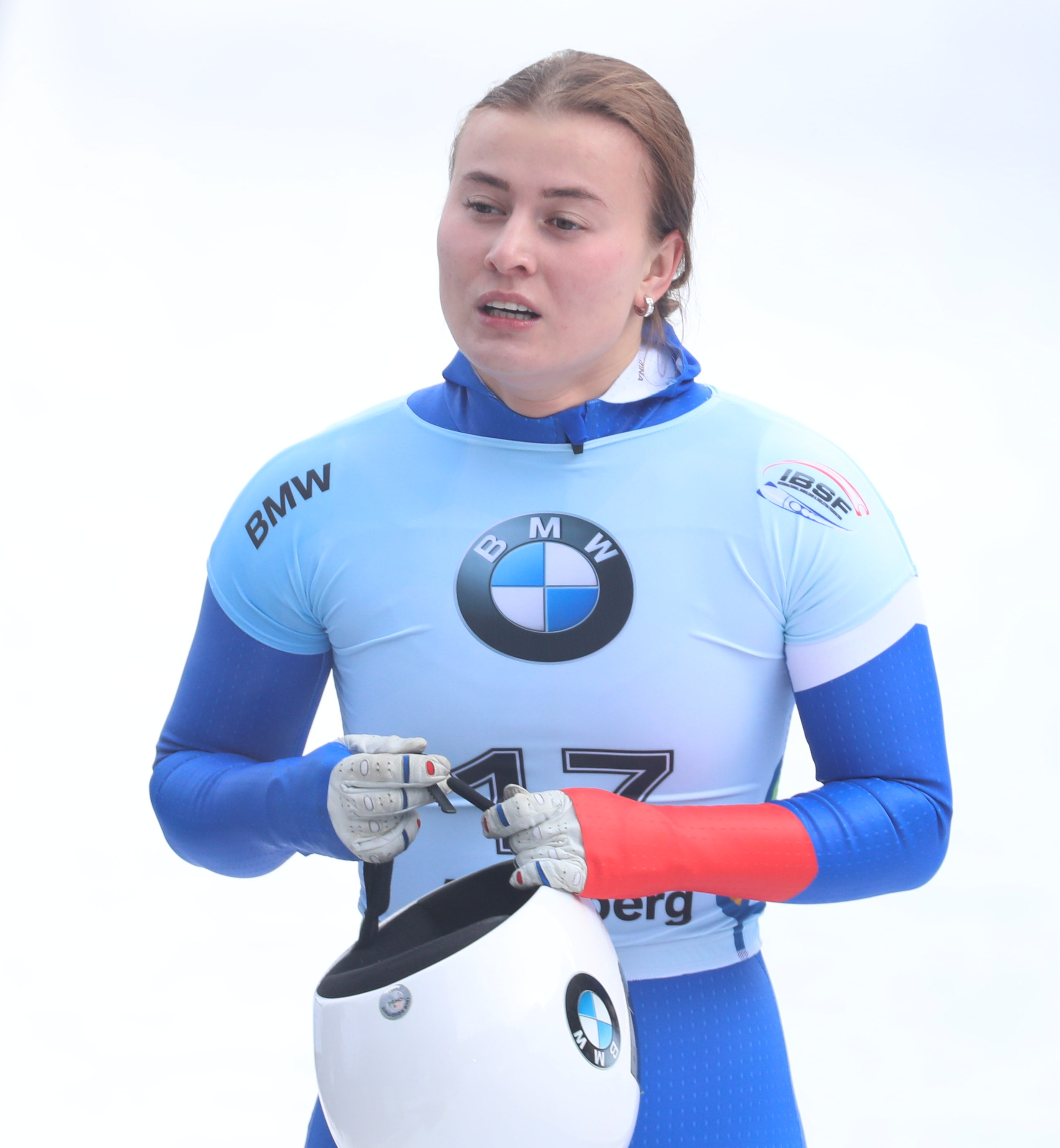
- Khuzina in 2020

Personal information
- Nationality: Russian
- Born: 15 May 1994 (age 32) Neftekamsk, Russia

Sport
- Country: Russia
- Sport: Skeleton
- Coached by: Faizov Rustem
Medal record
Junior World Championships
Silver medal – second place	2017 Sigulda	women

Renata Rinatovna Khuzina (Russian: Рената Ринатовна Хузина; born 15 May 1994 in Neftekamsk) is a Russian skeleton racer who competes on the Skeleton World Cup circuit. She was the IBSF Junior World silver medalist in women's skeleton for 2017 in Sigulda, behind her teammate Yulia Kanakina, and finished 20th in the senior IBSF World Championships later that year. Her personal coach is Faizov Rustem and she rides a Schneider sled.
