= 2020–21 Skeleton World Cup =

Winners
- Men's: Martins Dukurs (LAT) (10)
- Women's: Janine Flock (AUT) (2)

Competitions
- Venues: 5 (8 events)

The 2020–21 Skeleton World Cup was a multi-race series over a season for skeleton. The season started on 20 November 2020 Sigulda, Latvia and finished on Innsbruck-Igls, Austria on 29 January.

== Calendar ==
Venue	Date	Details
(Latvia) Sigulda 1	20 November 2020	
(Latvia) Sigulda 2	27 November 2020	
(Austria) Innsbruck-Igls 1	11 December 2020	Due to strong gusts of wind that caused snowdrifts in the track, Women's race shortened to one run
(Austria) Innsbruck-Igls 2	18 December 2020	
(Germany) Winterberg	8 January 2021	also European Championships
(Switzerland) St. Moritz	15 January 2021	
(Germany) Königssee	22 January 2021	
(Austria) Innsbruck-Igls 3	29 January 2021	
(Germany) Altenberg	11–13 February 2021	World Championships (Doesn't count toward to the World Cup standings)

== Results ==
=== Men ===
Event:	Gold:	Time	Silver:	Time	Bronze:	Time
(Latvia) Sigulda 1	Martins Dukurs; Latvia	1:40.44 (50.21 / 50.23)	Alexander Gassner; Germany	1:41.23 (50.87 / 50.36)	none awarded	
(Latvia) Sigulda 1	Martins Dukurs; Latvia	1:40.44 (50.21 / 50.23)	Felix Keisinger; Germany	1:41.23 (50.68 / 50.55)	none awarded	
(Latvia) Sigulda 2	Martins Dukurs; Latvia	1:38.91 (49.46 / 49.45)	Tomass Dukurs; Latvia	1:39.10 (49.55 / 49.55)	Marcus Wyatt; Great Britain	1:39.85 (50.03 / 49.82)
(Austria) Innsbruck-Igls 1	Martins Dukurs; Latvia	1:45.52 (52.90 / 52.62)	none awarded		Nikita Tregubov; Russia	1:45.54 (52.97 / 53.57)
(Austria) Innsbruck-Igls 1	Alexander Tretiakov; Russia	1:45.52 (53.04 / 52.48)	none awarded		Nikita Tregubov; Russia	1:45.54 (52.97 / 53.57)
(Austria) Innsbruck-Igls 2	Martins Dukurs; Latvia	1:44.55 (52.43 / 52.12)	Matt Weston; Great Britain	1:44.75 (52.53 / 52.22)	Christopher Grotheer; Germany	1:44.88 (52.65 / 52.23)
(Germany) Winterberg	Alexander Tretiakov; Russia	1:52.36 (56.28 / 56.08)	Martins Dukurs; Latvia	1:52.53 (56.46 / 56.07)	Alexander Gassner; Germany	1:52.57 (56.43 / 56.14)
(Switzerland) St. Moritz	Alexander Gassner; Germany	2:16.85 (1:08.42 / 1:08.43)	Martins Dukurs; Latvia	2:16.86 (1:08.22 / 1:08.64)	Yun Sung-bin; South Korea	2:17.32 (1:08.61 / 1:08.71)
(Germany) Königssee	Alexander Gassner; Germany	1:39.88 (49.91 / 49.97)	Yun Sung-bin; South Korea	1:39.92 (49.90 / 50.02)	Alexander Tretiakov; Russia	1:40.01 (50.09 / 49.92)
(Austria) Innsbruck-Igls 3	Alexander Tretiakov; Russia	1:45.59 (52.78 / 52.81)	Craig Thompson; Great Britain	1:45.82 (52.80 / 53.02)	Samuel Maier; Austria	1:45.86 (53.05 / 52.81)

=== Women ===
Event:	Gold:	Time	Silver:	Time	Bronze:	Time
(Latvia) Sigulda 1	Janine Flock; Austria	1:43.85 (51.49 / 52.36)	Kimberley Bos; Netherlands	1:44.68 (52.04 / 52.64)	Endija Tērauda; Latvia	1:45.25 (52.41 / 52.84)
(Latvia) Sigulda 2	Janine Flock; Austria	1:42.93 (51.47 / 51.46)	Elena Nikitina; Russia	1:43.58 (51.78 / 51.80)	Kimberley Bos; Netherlands	1:43.73 (51.88 / 51.85)
(Latvia) Sigulda 2	Janine Flock; Austria	1:42.93 (51.47 / 51.46)	Elena Nikitina; Russia	1:43.58 (51.78 / 51.80)	Tina Hermann; Germany	1:43.73 (51.98 / 52.75)
(Austria) Innsbruck-Igls 1	Elena Nikitina; Russia	53.74	Kimberley Bos; Netherlands	54.02	Janine Flock; Austria	54.19
(Austria) Innsbruck-Igls 1	Elena Nikitina; Russia	53.74	Kimberley Bos; Netherlands	54.02	Tina Hermann; Germany	54.19
(Austria) Innsbruck-Igls 2	Janine Flock; Austria	1:47.01 (53.47 / 53.54)	Kimberley Bos; Netherlands	1:47.22 (53.59 / 53.63)	Jacqueline Lölling; Germany	1:47.23 (53.64 / 53.59)
(Germany) Winterberg	Elena Nikitina; Russia	1:55.10 (57.60 / 57.50)	Tina Hermann; Germany	1:55.16 (57.58 / 57.58)	Janine Flock; Austria	1:55.29 (57.64 / 57.65)
(Switzerland) St. Moritz	Tina Hermann; Germany	2:20.68 (1:10.62 / 1:10.06)	Janine Flock; Austria	2:21.00 (1:10.41 / 1:10.59)	Jacqueline Lölling; Germany	2:21.54 (1:10.74 / 1:10.80)
(Germany) Königssee	Jacqueline Lölling; Germany	1:42.30 (51.23 / 51.07)	Anna Fernstädtová; Czech Republic	1:42.77 (51.39 / 51.38)	Jane Channell; Canada	1:42.93 (51.69 / 51.24)
(Germany) Königssee	Jacqueline Lölling; Germany	1:42.30 (51.23 / 51.07)	Anna Fernstädtová; Czech Republic	1:42.77 (51.39 / 51.38)	Janine Flock; Austria	1:42.93 (51.25 / 51.68)
(Austria) Innsbruck-Igls 3	Elena Nikitina; Russia	1:47.73 (53.80 / 53.93)	Janine Flock; Austria	1:48.12 (54.19 / 53.93)	Kimberley Bos; Netherlands	1:48.37 (54.19 / 54.18)

== Standings ==
=== Men ===
Pos.	Racer	(Latvia) SIG 1	(Latvia) SIG 2	(Austria) IGL 1	(Austria) IGL 2	(Germany) WIN	(Switzerland) STM	(Germany) KON	(Austria) IGL 3	Points
1	Martins Dukurs (LAT)	1	1	1	1	2	2	11	–	1456
2	Alexander Gassner (GER)	2	5	5	7	3	1	1	–	1396
3	Tomass Dukurs (LAT)	4	2	10	8	6	5	8	–	1226
4	Christopher Grotheer (GER)	11	7	6	3	8	6	6	–	1192
5	Alexander Tretiakov (RUS)	9	10	1	–	1	–	3	1	1171
6	Felix Keisinger (GER)	2	6	11	4	4	7	–	–	1074
7	Nikita Tregubov (RUS)	7	4	3	–	9	–	7	6	1056
8	Marcus Wyatt (GBR)	8	3	–	–	13	8	5	5	1008
9	Matt Weston (GBR)	5	12	4	2	–	–	10	11	994
10	Daniil Romanov (RUS)	13	15	8	5	7	–	18	8	976

=== Women ===
Pos.	Racer	(Latvia) SIG 1	(Latvia) SIG 2	(Austria) IGL 1	(Austria) IGL 2	(Germany) WIN	(Switzerland) STM	(Germany) KON	(Austria) IGL 3	Points
1	Janine Flock (AUT)	1	1	3	1	3	2	3	2	1695
2	Tina Hermann (GER)	7	3	3	4	2	1	10	6	1515
3	Kimberley Bos (NED)	2	3	2	2	7	–	12	3	1326
4	Jacqueline Lölling (GER)	8	7	6	3	4	3	1	–	1321
5	Anna Fernstädtová (CZE)	4	10	8	9	8	7	2	12	1314
6	Elena Nikitina (RUS)	9	2	1	–	1	–	5	1	1221
7	Kim Meylemans (BEL)	5	6	17	11	9	8	8	–	1056
8	Valentina Margaglio (ITA)	10	12	5	6	11	–	–	4	960
9	Hannah Neise (GER)	13	14	8	10	5	4	–	–	912
10	Laura Deas (GBR)	6	5	–	–	12	14	13	8	880

== Medal table ==
Rank	Nation	Gold	Silver	Bronze	Total
1	Russia	6	1	2	9
2	Germany	4	3	6	13
3	Latvia	4	3	1	8
4	Austria	3	2	4	9
5	Netherlands	0	3	2	5
6	Great Britain	0	2	1	3
7	South Korea	0	1	1	2
8	Czech Republic	0	1	0	1
9	Canada	0	0	1	1
Totals (9 entries)		17	16	18	51

== Points ==
Place	1	2	3	4	5	6	7	8	9	10	11	12	13	14	15	16	17	18	19	20
Individual	225	210	200	192	184	176	168	160	152	144	136	128	120	112	104	96	88	80	74	68
