= Yun Sung-bin =

South Korean skeleton racer (born 1994)

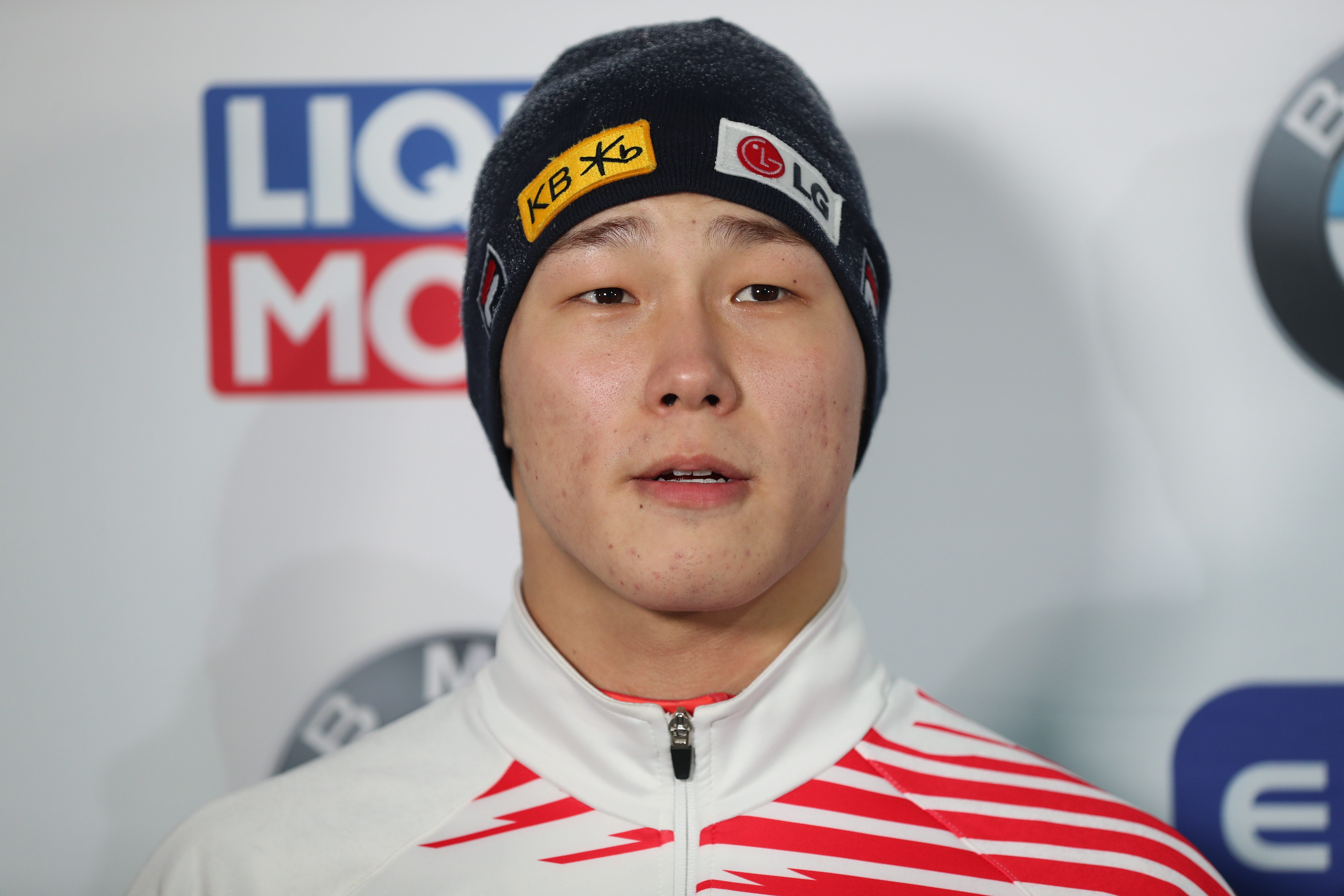
- Yun Sung-bin (2019)

Personal information
- Nickname: Iron Man
- Nationality: South Korean
- Born: 23 May 1994 (age 32) Namhae, South Korea
- Height: 1.78 m (5 ft 10 in)
- Weight: 92.7 kg (204 lb)

Sport
- Country: South Korea
- Sport: Skeleton
- Turned pro: 2011
Medal record
Olympic Games
| Gold medal – first place | 2018 Pyeongchang | Men |
World Championships
| Silver medal – second place | 2016 Igls | Men |
| Bronze medal – third place | 2019 Whistler | Men |

- Yun Sung-bin
- Hangul: 윤성빈
- Hanja: 尹誠彬
- RR: Yun Seongbin
- MR: Yun Sŏngbin

Yun Sung-bin

YouTube information
- Channel: 아이언빈 윤성빈
- Years active: 2022
- Subscribers: 618,000
- Views: 492 million
- Last updated: 28 November 2025

Yun Sung-bin (Korean: 윤성빈; born 23 May 1994) is a South Korean skeleton racer and an actor. He won the gold medal in men's skeleton at the 2018 Winter Olympics in Pyeongchang and was a participant at the 2014 Winter Olympics in Sochi.

== Early life and education ==
Born in 1994 in South Korea's southern coastal region of Namhae, South Gyeongsang Province, Yun grew up knowing nothing about the winter sliding sport. Still, as a child, Yun always enjoyed running around at the beach and excelled in many sports at school, including soccer, badminton, competitive running, and jumping, among others.

Yun moved to Seoul when he was in middle school and continued playing sports at school, hoping to get into a sports university. In 100-metre races, he would ask to start 10 metres back from others his age and still beat other runners. At 1.78 meter in height, he could grab a basketball rim with ease. While playing basketball in high school, Yun's natural athletic ability was noticed by his physical education teacher, Kim Young-tae, who was also serving as one of the officials at the Korea Bobsleigh Skeleton Federation at the time.

Yun attended Korea National Sport University, who had recruited him from his teacher's recommendation.

== Career ==
=== Skeleton ===
Yun is known for his exceptional agility and athleticism, enabling him to pick things up in the sport quickly. Yun is also famous for his Iron Man-like helmet, which makes it appear that the Marvel comic hero is flying full-speed ahead when Yun is on the track.

Yun started skeleton at the age of 18 in early 2012, and after three-month training, he won the national championship in September 2012. Yun made his international debut in the 2012–13 season, appearing at the North American Cup Tour. Yun first garnered attention in the 2013–14 season when he was ranked fifth overall at the 2013–14 FIBT Intercontinental Cup Tour. He won gold in the sixth round of the tour in Whistler, Canada on 5–6 January 2014, becoming the first Korean skeleton slider to finish on top of the podium at an international event.

Yun finished his first Olympic competition with a disappointing 16th place in Sochi. Yun, however, flourished in the 2014–15 season under the tutelage of British sled specialist Richard Bromley, a co-founder of Bromley Sports, one of the world's top sled manufacturing companies. Yun recorded his first World Cup podium with a bronze at Calgary in December 2014. In the overall 2014–15 World Cup rankings, Yun finished his rookie season in sixth place with one silver and two bronze.

In the 2015–16 season, Yun earned his first World Cup gold medal in the seventh round in St. Moritz, along with a silver at the 2016 IBSF World Championships in Igls, finishing the season's overall World Cup rankings in second place with one gold, three silver, and two bronze.

In the 2016–17 season, Yun earned his second World Cup gold medal in the first round in Whistler. He finished the season's overall World Cup rankings in second place with one gold, three silver, and two bronze.

Yun won the overall 2017–18 World Cup, becoming the first Asian athlete to ever win the overall title in the Skeleton World Cup. Despite opting to miss the World Cup finale in Königssee, he managed to score a total of 1,545 points from five wins and two silver medals, giving him enough to win the overall standings ahead of Axel Jungk (1,507 points) and Tomass Dukurs (1,464).

At the 2018 Winter Olympics in Pyeongchang, Yun captured a gold medal, becoming the first athlete from outside Europe and North America to win an Olympic sliding medal and the first athlete from South Korea to win a Winter Olympic medal in a non-ice skating event. His four-run time of 3 minutes, 20.55 seconds was 1.63 seconds ahead of silver medalist Nikita Tregubov of Russia. It was the biggest victory margin in Olympic skeleton, topping 1948 when Italy's Nino Bibbia topped Jack Heaton of the United States by 1.4 seconds in a six-heat race.

In 2026, Yun was appointed as a commentator at the 2026 Winter Olympics in Milan and Cortina d'Ampezzo by broadcasting on JTBC.

=== Entertainment ===
In 2023, Yun was a contestant on the Netflix reality show Physical: 100. and hosted tvN variety show Korean Starcation.

In 2024, Yun joined MBC reality show, League of Universities: The Athlete Boys as a coach for his juniors from Korea National Sport University. and U+ Mobile TV golf program To Die For.

In 2025, Yun participated in Netflix reality show Physical: Asia as a member of Team South Korea. In September, he joined kthd. studio, also known as Kick The Hurdle Studio, which lists Dex among its artists. and is set to appear on MBN's new volleyball show, Spike War.

It was reported that Yun will be debuting as an actor in a South Korea–Japan joint project movie, The House of Ghosts, adapted from the Japanese short story Dead-End Memories. Filming was completed in November, and the movie is set to be released in the second half of 2026 in both South Korea and Japan.

== Results ==
=== World Cup ===
==== Overall standings ====
| 2014—15 | | | 2015—16 | | | 2016—17 | | | 2017—18 | | |
| Races | Points | Position | Races | Points | Position | Races | Points | Position | Races | Points | Position |
|---|---|---|---|---|---|---|---|---|---|---|---|
| 7/8 | 1218 | 6th | 8/8 | 1575 | 2nd | 8/8 | 1623 | 2nd | 7/8 | 1545 | 1st |
| 2018—19 | | | 2019—20 | | | 2020-21 | | | 2021-22 | | |
| Races | Points | Position | Races | Points | Position | Races | Points | Position | Races | Points | Position |
| 8/8 | 1680 | 2nd | 8/8 | 1581 | 3rd | 3/8 | 607 | 17 | 8/8 | 1012 | 11 |

==== Race victories (10) ====
| No. | Season | Round | Date | Location | Margin | Runner(s)-up |
|---|---|---|---|---|---|---|
| 1 | 2015–16 | 7 | 5 February 2016 | St. Moritz, Switzerland | 0.07 | (Latvia) Martins Dukurs, (Latvia) Tomass Dukurs |
| 2 | 2016–17 | 1 | 3 December 2016 | Whistler, Canada | 0.12 | (Russia) Alexander Tretiakov |
| 3 | 2017–18 | 2 | 18 November 2017 | (United States) Park City, USA | 0.63 | (Latvia) Martins Dukurs |
| 4 | 2017–18 | 3 | 25 November 2017 | Whistler, Canada | 0.75 | (Russia) Nikita Tregubov |
| 5 | 2017–18 | 4 | 8 December 2017 | Winterberg, Germany | 0.06 | (Latvia) Martins Dukurs |
| 6 | 2017–18 | 6 | 5 January 2018 | Altenberg, Germany | 0.39 | (Russia) Alexander Tretiakov |
| 7 | 2017–18 | 7 | 12 January 2018 | St. Moritz, Switzerland | 0.87 | (Germany) Axel Jungk |
| 8 | 2018–19 | 5 | 25 January 2019 | St. Moritz, Switzerland | 0.20 | (Russia) Alexander Tretiakov |
| 9 | 2018–19 | 9 | 24 February 2019 | Calgary, Canada | 0.06 | (Russia) Alexander Tretiakov |
| 10 | 2019–20 | 3 | 5 January 2020 | Winterberg, Germany | 0.05 | (Germany) Alexander Gassner |

== Filmography ==
=== Film ===
| Year | Title | Role | Notes | Ref. |
|---|---|---|---|---|
| TBA | The House of Ghosts | Min-soo | | |

=== Television series ===
| Year | Title | Role | Notes | Ref. |
|---|---|---|---|---|
| 2025 | Pump Up the Healthy Love | Himself | Special Cameo | |

=== Television show ===
| Year | Title | Role | Notes | Ref. |
|---|---|---|---|---|
| 2022 | Golf King | Cast Member | Season 4 | |
| 2023 | Carefree Travellers Returns | Cast Member | Episode 9–12 | |
| 2023 | Korean Starcation | Host | | |
| 2024 | League of Universities: The Athlete Boys | Coach | | |
| 2024 | League of Universities: The Athlete Boys Special | Coach | | |
| 2024 | To Die For | Cast Member | | |
| 2025 | Spike War | Cast Member | | |

=== Web shows ===
| Year | Title | Role | Ref. |
|---|---|---|---|
| 2023 | Physical: 100 | Contestant | |
| 2025 | Physical: Asia | Contestant | |
