= Madelaine Smith =

British skeleton racer (born 1995)

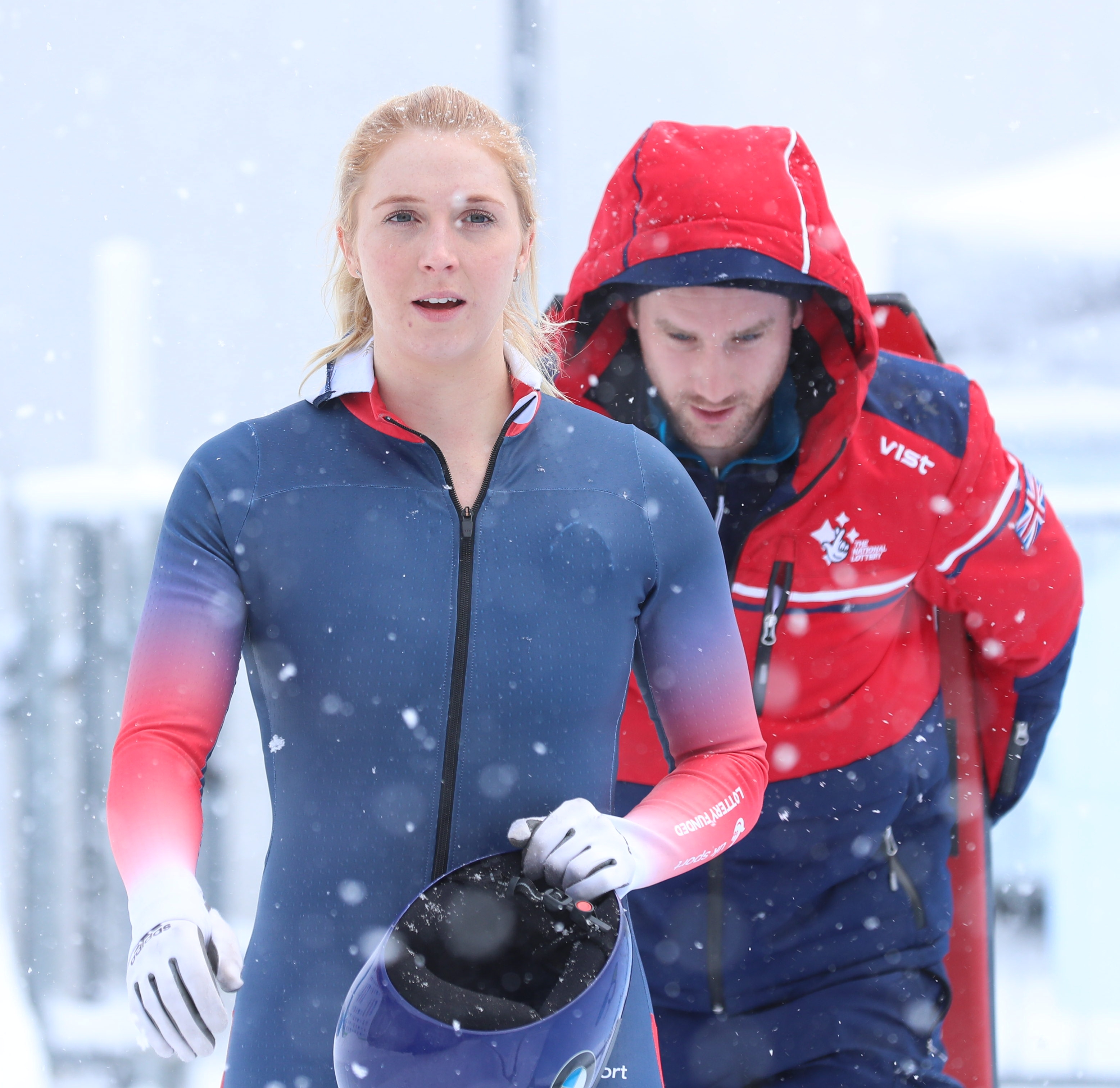

Personal information
- Nationality: British
- Born: 19 January 1995 (age 30); Solihull, England
- Height: 5 ft 8 in (1.73 m)
- Weight: 75 kg (165 lb)

Sport
- Country: Great Britain
- Sport: Skeleton

Madelaine Smith (born 19 January 1995 in Solihull) is a British skeleton racer who competes on the Skeleton World Cup and lower ranking circuits. She started racing in 2014, and was promoted to the World Cup circuit for the first time at Igls in December, 2017, where she finished 17th. Her best finish on the ICC was 5th, achieved at three races in Calgary, and she won both North American Cup races in Park City in 2017. In 2019/2020 Madelaine designed her own line of winter sports sunglasses for British eye wear brand - Toyshades. She came to skeleton from athletics, where she was a hurdler, at the suggestion of aerial skier Lloyd Wallace.
