= Vladislav Marchenkov =

Russian skeleton racer

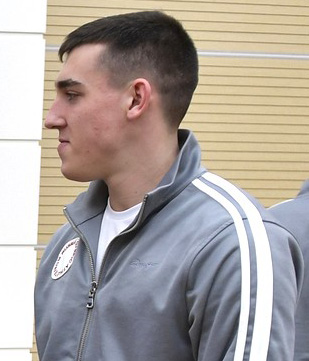

Personal information
- Nationality: Russian
- Born: 29 October 1996 (age 29)
- Height: 1.89 m (6 ft 2 in)

Sport
- Sport: Skeleton

Vladislav Igorevich Marchenkov (Russian: Владислав Игоревич Марченков) (born 29 October 1996) is a Russian skeleton racer. He competed in the 2018 Winter Olympics.
