= Felix Keisinger =

German skeleton racer (born 1997)

Felix Keisenger
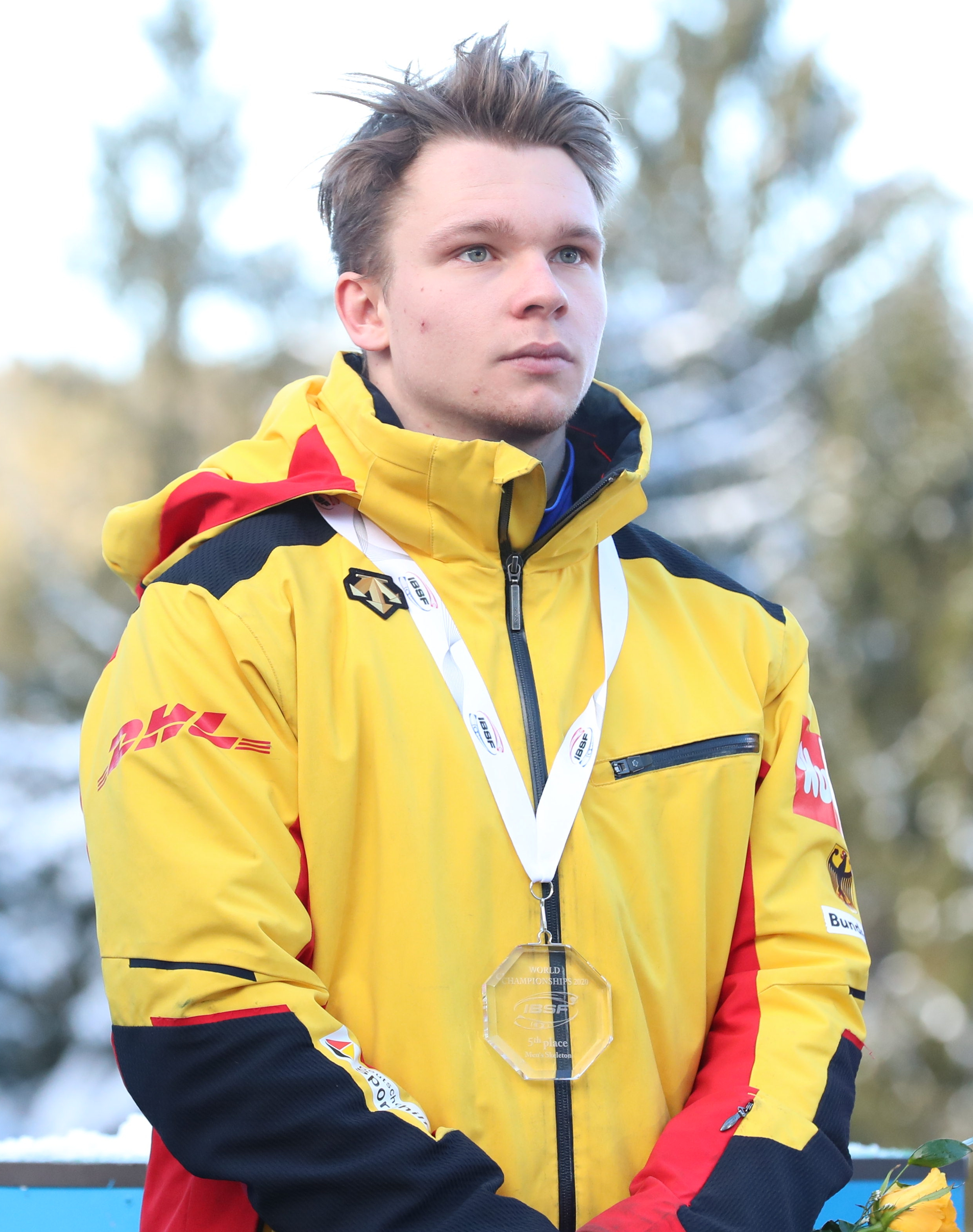
- Keisinger in 2020

Personal information
- Nationality: German
- Born: 29 December 1997 (age 28)
- Height: 1.74 m (5 ft 9 in)
- Weight: 74 kg (163 lb)

Sport
- Country: Germany
- Sport: Skeleton
Medal record
Men's skeleton
Representing Germany
European Championships
Bronze medal – third place	2020 Sigulda	Men
Bronze medal – third place	2024 Sigulda	Men
World Cup
Event	1st	2nd	3rd
Men	0	2	3
Total	0	2	3
- Updated as of 7 February 2025
Junior World Championships
Gold medal – first place	2019 Königssee	Men
Gold medal – first place	2020 Winterberg	Men
Silver medal – second place	2021 St. Moritz	Men
Bronze medal – third place	2018 St. Moritz	Men

Felix Keisinger (born 29 December 1997) is a German Skeleton racer who finished fourth in the standings in the men's singles category of the 2019-20 Skeleton World Cup.

Keisinger is also double Skeleton junior world championships gold medalist having triumphed in that contest in 2019 in Königssee and in 2020 at Winterberg.

During the 2020-21 Skeleton World Cup Keisinger tied for silver with Martins Dukurs of Latvia in the second race of the season at Siguda in Latvia.

== Career results ==
All results are sourced from the International Bobsleigh and Skeleton Federation (IBSF).

=== World Championships ===
Event	Men	Skeleton mixed team	Mixed team
(Canada) 2019 Whistler	13th	—N/a	—
(Germany) 2020 Altenberg	5th	—	—N/a
(Germany) 2021 Altenberg	4th	—	—N/a
(Switzerland) 2023 St. Moritz	12th	7th	—N/a
(Germany) 2024 Winterberg	6th	—	—N/a
(United States) 2025 Lake Placid	14th	—	—N/a

=== World Cup results ===
Season	1	2	3	4	5	6	7	8	Points	Place
2018–19	5	8	–	–	–	11	11	–	616	18th
2019–20	5	3	5	7	7	3	2	4	1506	4th
2020–21	2	6	11	4	4	7	–	–	1074	6th
2021–22										
2022–23	7	4	8	7	8	14	8	5	1304	7th
2023–24	–	7	3	9	5	4	5	13	1200	7th
2024–25	9	8	14	9	6	6	18	6	1192	6th
