= Kim Ji-soo (skeleton racer) =

South Korean skeleton racer (born 1994)

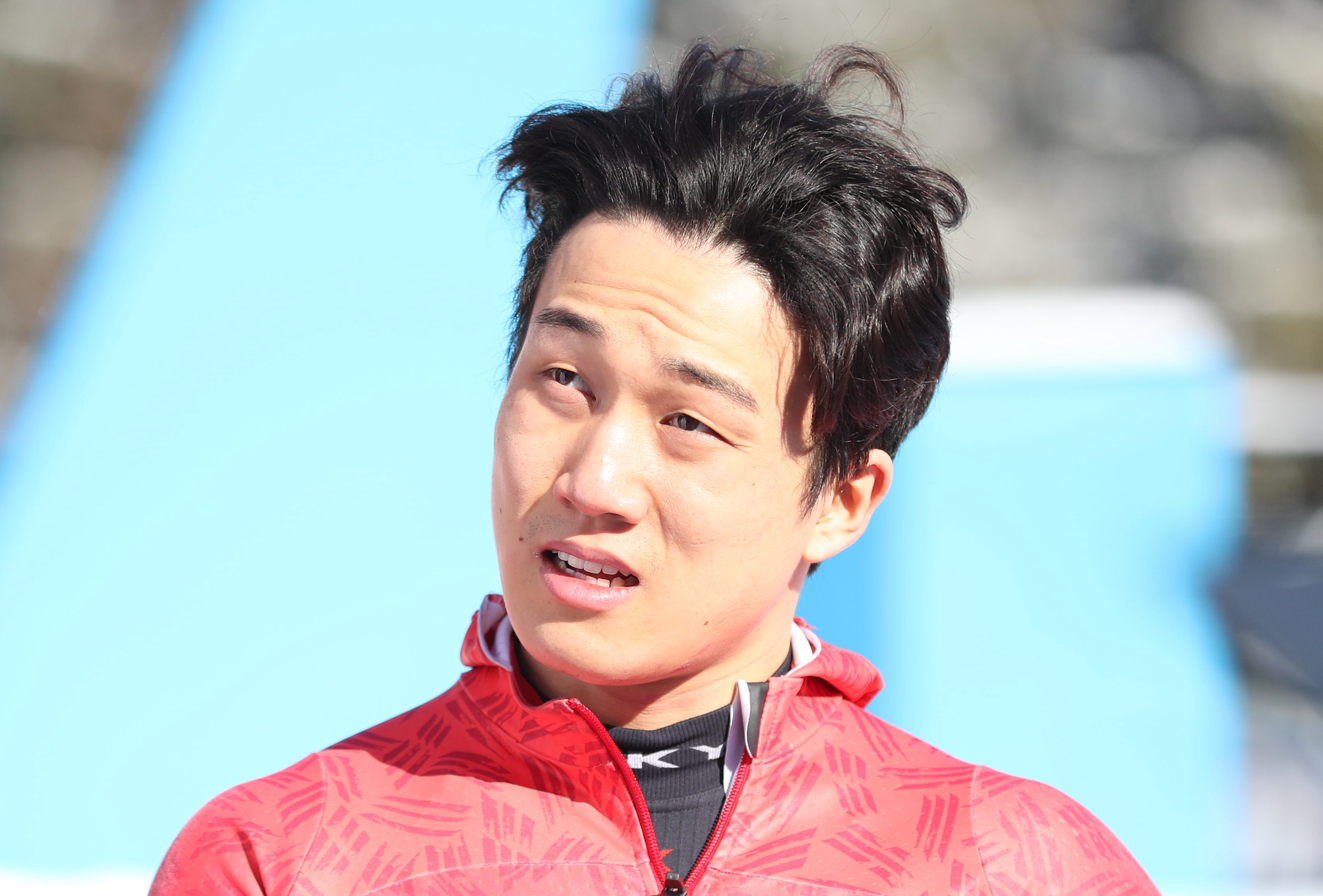

Personal information
- Nationality: South Korean
- Born: 22 July 1994 (age 31)
- Height: 1.77 m (5 ft 10 in)

Sport
- Sport: Skeleton

Kim Ji-soo (Korean: 김지수; born 22 July 1994) is a South Korean skeleton racer. He competed in the 2018 Winter Olympics.

== Competitive Highlights ==
=== Olympic Games ===
Event	Men's Skeleton
Representing South Korea
(South Korea) 2018 PyeongChang	6th
(Italy) 2026 Milano Cortina	16th

=== World Championships ===
Event	Men's Skeleton
Representing South Korea
(Canada) 2019 Whistler	14th
(Germany) 2020 Altenberg	12th
(Germany) 2021 Altenberg	24th
(Switzerland) 2023 St.Moritz	8th
(Germany) 2024 Winterberg	18th
(United States) 2025 Lake Placid	13th

=== Skeleton World Cup ===
Season	Place	Points	1	2	3	4	5	6	7	8
2018–19	37th	96	SIG -	WIN -	ALT -	IGL -	STM -	LPL -	CGR1 -	CGR2; 15
2019–20	9th	1126	LPL1; 16	LPL2; 10	WIN; 6	LPG; 6	IGL; 5	KON; 12	STM; 8	SIG; 21
2020–21	20th	392	SIG1 -	SIG2 -	IGL1 -	IGL2 -	WIN -	STM -	KON; 13	IGL3; 12
2021–22	13th	904	IGL1; 9	IGL2; 14	ALT1; 16	WIN1; 14	ALT2; 17	SIG; 13	WIN2; 14	STM; 14
2022–23	6th	1312	WHI; 11	PCT; 5	LPL; 7	WIN; 5	ALT1; 7	ALT2; 11	IGL; 6	SIG; 8
