= Geng Wenqiang =

Chinese skeleton racer

Geng Wenqian
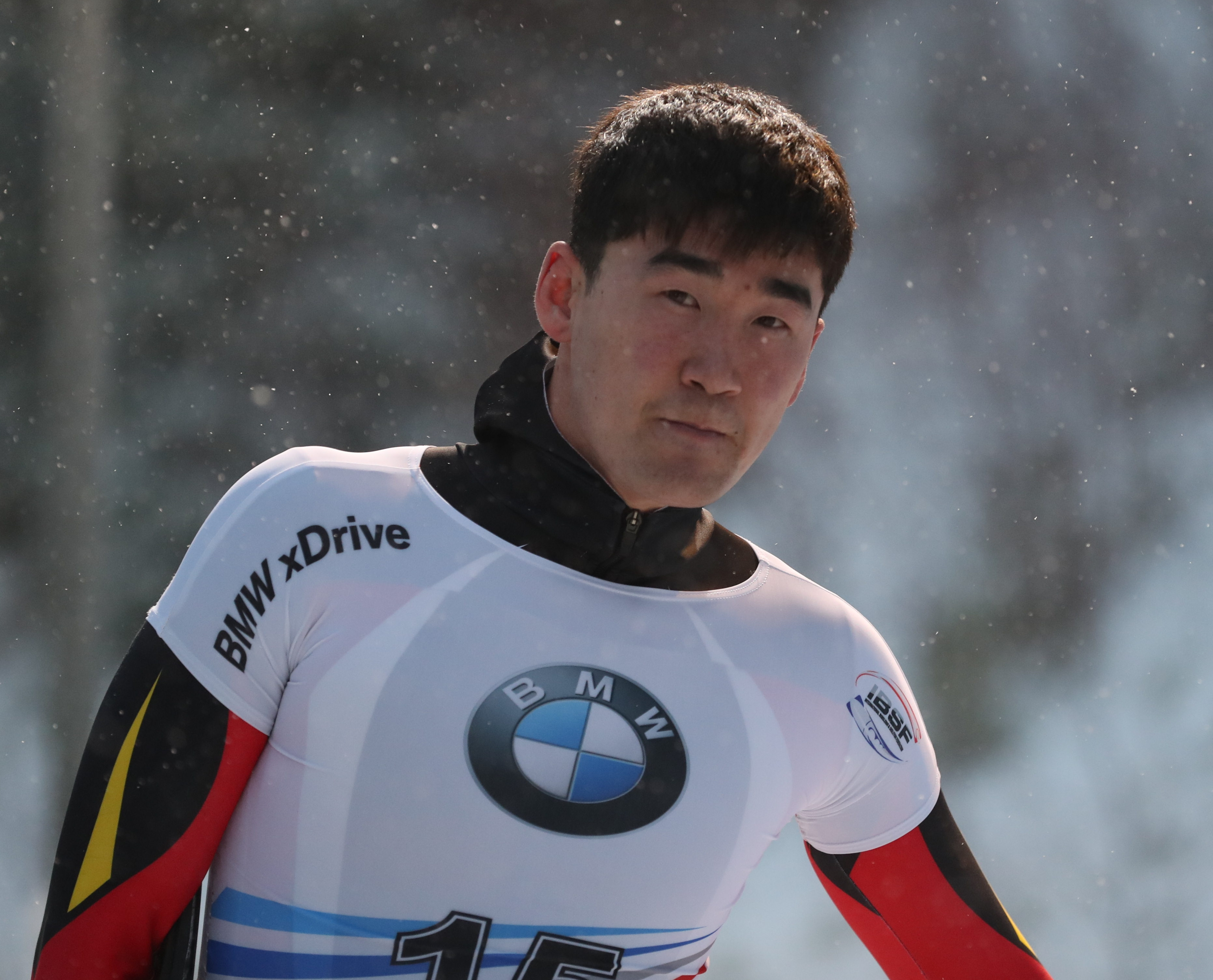
- Men's World Cup race at the 2018/19 Skeleton World Cup in Altenberg

Personal information
- Nationality: Chinese
- Born: 11 September 1995 (age 30)
- Height: 1.83 m (6 ft 0 in)

Sport
- Sport: Skeleton

Geng Wenqiang
- Simplified Chinese: 耿文强
- Traditional Chinese: 耿文強
Transcriptions
Standard Mandarin
- Hanyu Pinyin: Gěng Wénqiáng
- IPA: [kə̀ŋ wə̌n tɕʰjǎŋ]

Geng Wenqiang (Chinese: 耿文强; pinyin: Gěng Wénqiáng; Mandarin pronunciation: [kə̀ŋ wə̌n tɕʰjǎŋ]; born 11 September 1995) is a Chinese skeleton racer. He competed in the 2018 Winter Olympics.
