= Alexander Gassner =

German skeleton racer (born 1989)

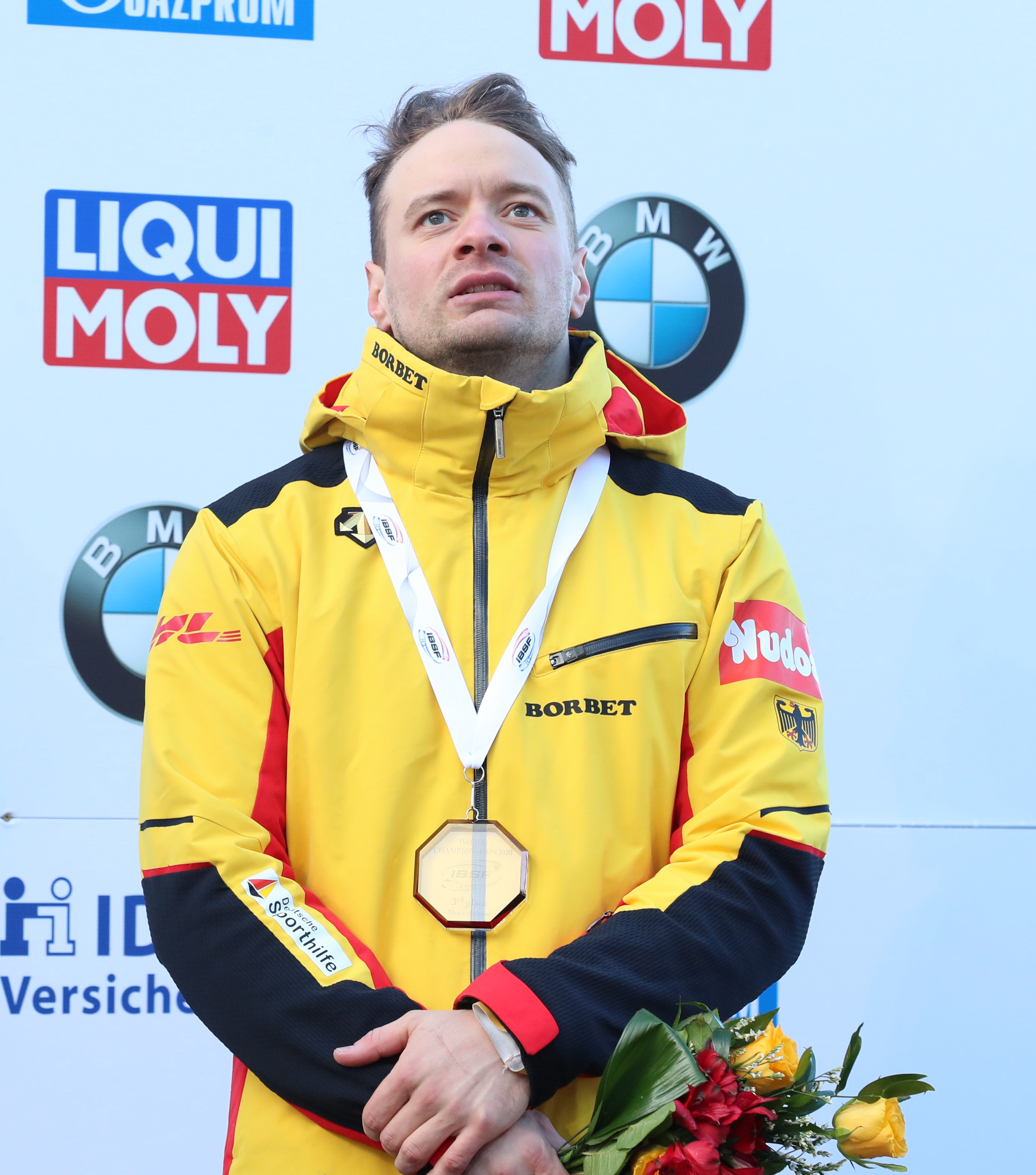
- Gassner in 2020

Personal information
- Nationality: German
- Born: 9 August 1989 (age 36) Prundu Bârgăului, Romania
- Height: 1.73 m (5 ft 8 in)
- Weight: 74 kg (163 lb)

Sport
- Country: Germany
- Sport: Skeleton
- Club: BSC Winterberg
Medal record
World Championships
| Gold medal – first place | 2020 Altenberg | Mixed skeleton |
| Silver medal – second place | 2021 Altenberg | Mixed team |
| Bronze medal – third place | 2017 Königssee | Mixed team |
| Bronze medal – third place | 2020 Altenberg | Men |
| Bronze medal – third place | 2021 Altenberg | Men |
European Championships
| Silver medal – second place | 2022 St. Moritz | Men |
| Bronze medal – third place | 2021 Winterberg | Men |

Alexander Gassner (born 9 August 1989) is a German skeleton racer who has competed since 2004. In 2007, he joined the German national squad. Gassner became Junior World Champion in skeleton in 2010. 2011–12 Skeleton World Cup he finished 6th. He took first place in the 2012 German Skeleton Championship.
