= Sigulda bobsleigh, luge, and skeleton track =

Sports venue in Sigulda, Latvia

Coordinates: 57.152211°N 24.838586°E

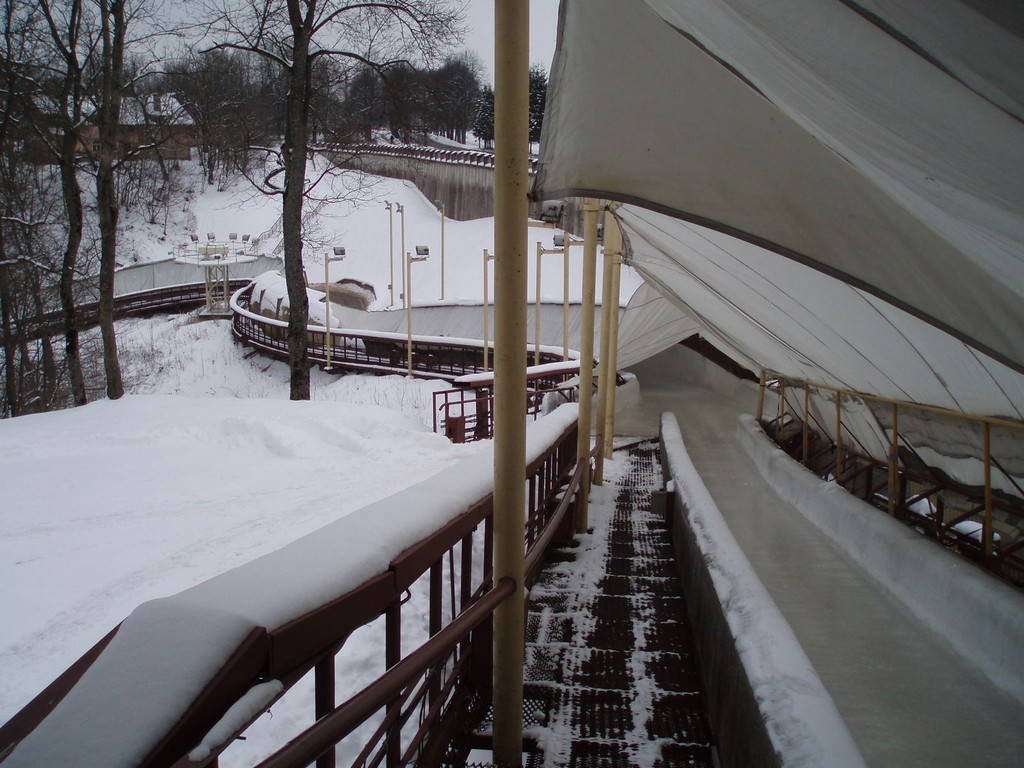
Sigulda bobsleigh, luge, and skeleton track's lower start

The Sigulda Bobsleigh and Luge Track (Latvian: Siguldas bobsleja un kamaniņu trase) is located in Sigulda, Sigulda Municipality, Latvia, built in 1986. Currently, the track manager is Dainis Dukurs, former bobsleigh brakeman and the father of skeleton racers Martins and Tomass Dukurs.

== History ==
Sledding took place in Sigulda as early as 1887. Several alpine skiing venues were held near the track following World War II. By the late 1960s, the city government of Sigulda approved the construction of a new track, designed by the Leipzig Sports Facilities Scientific and Technical Centre in East Germany. Construction began in 1984 with the participation of the Yugoslav company Graming d.o.o. from Bosnia and local builders, and the track was finally completed in 1986. It was built primarily for the needs of Soviet bobsledders and lugers, but after the restoration of the independence of Latvia in 1990, the track became the training center for Latvian wintersport athletes.

Although skeleton wasn't initially in the building plan, Sigulda has hosted World Cup races in skeleton since the 2000s. Also, luge competitions are hosted in Sigulda each year, however, the track can't host four-man bobsleigh races, therefore there haven't been any World Championship races hosted in Sigulda, although in the 2018/2019 season a Bobsleigh World Cup stage will take place in Sigulda. Zintis Ekmanis and the original track designers has designed a new layout which would change two curves and make four-man bobsleigh races possible, though some lugers are not happy with this idea, because this may render the track unusable for women's singles and men's doubles lugers. Also, Dainis Dukurs has said in an interview for Sporta Avīze that there was an experiment involving Juris Šics, Andris Šics, Tomass Dukurs and Martins Dukurs, in which the quartet drove with a four-man bobsleigh without crashing. Dukurs stated that this proves that the track is, in fact, suitable for four-man teams, but to make it perfect for bobsleigh, most of the track should be rebuilt. The track will undergo major renovation after 2014 season. Also, an artificial ice start estacade was built in summer of 2008. It would have been used for bobsled, skeleton, and luge events for the 2026 Winter Olympics had the bid of Stockholm–Åre won.

== Statistics ==
Physical statistics
Sport	Length (meters)	Turns
Two-man bobsleigh and skeleton	1200	16
Luge – men's singles	1200	16
Luge – women's singles and men's doubles	988	13

No vertical drop, percent grading, or turn names were mentioned.

Track records
Sport	Record	Nation – athlete(s)	Date	Time (seconds)
Luge – men's singles	Start	Johannes Ludwig (GER)	24 January 2010	4.285
Luge – men's singles	Track	Albert Demchenko (RUS)	24 January 2010	48.282
Luge – women's singles	Start	Tatjana Hüfner (GER)	15 February 2008	1.799
Luge – women's singles	Track	Tatiana Ivanova (RUS)	23 January 2010	42.679
Luge – men's doubles	Start	Patric Leitner (GER) & Alexander Resch (GER)	6 December 2008	1.698
Luge – men's doubles	Track	Andreas Linger (AUT) & Wolfgang Linger (AUT)	23 January 2010	42.172

== Championships hosted ==
- FIL European Luge Championships: 1996, 2010, 2014, 2018
- FIL World Luge Championships: 2003, 2015
