= Olympic Sliding Centre Innsbruck =

Bobsleigh venue in Igls, Austria

Coordinates: 47.22216°N 11.43004°E

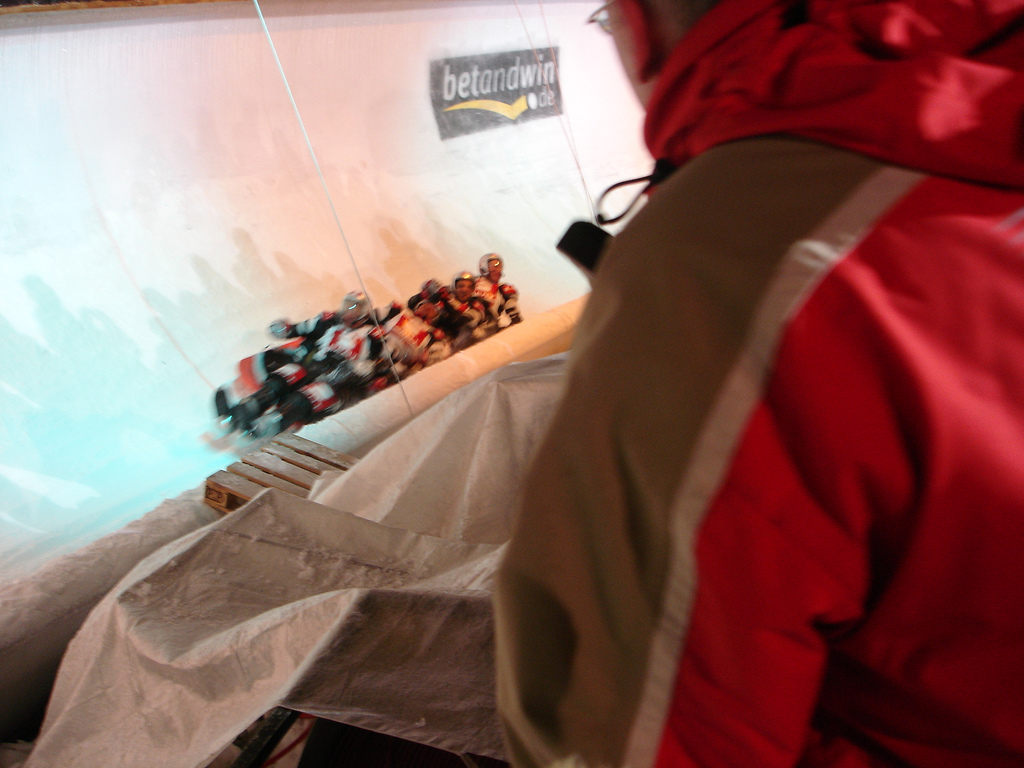
Four-man wok racing at the 2006 World Championships held at the track. Germany's Georg Hackl is among the four-man team on the track.

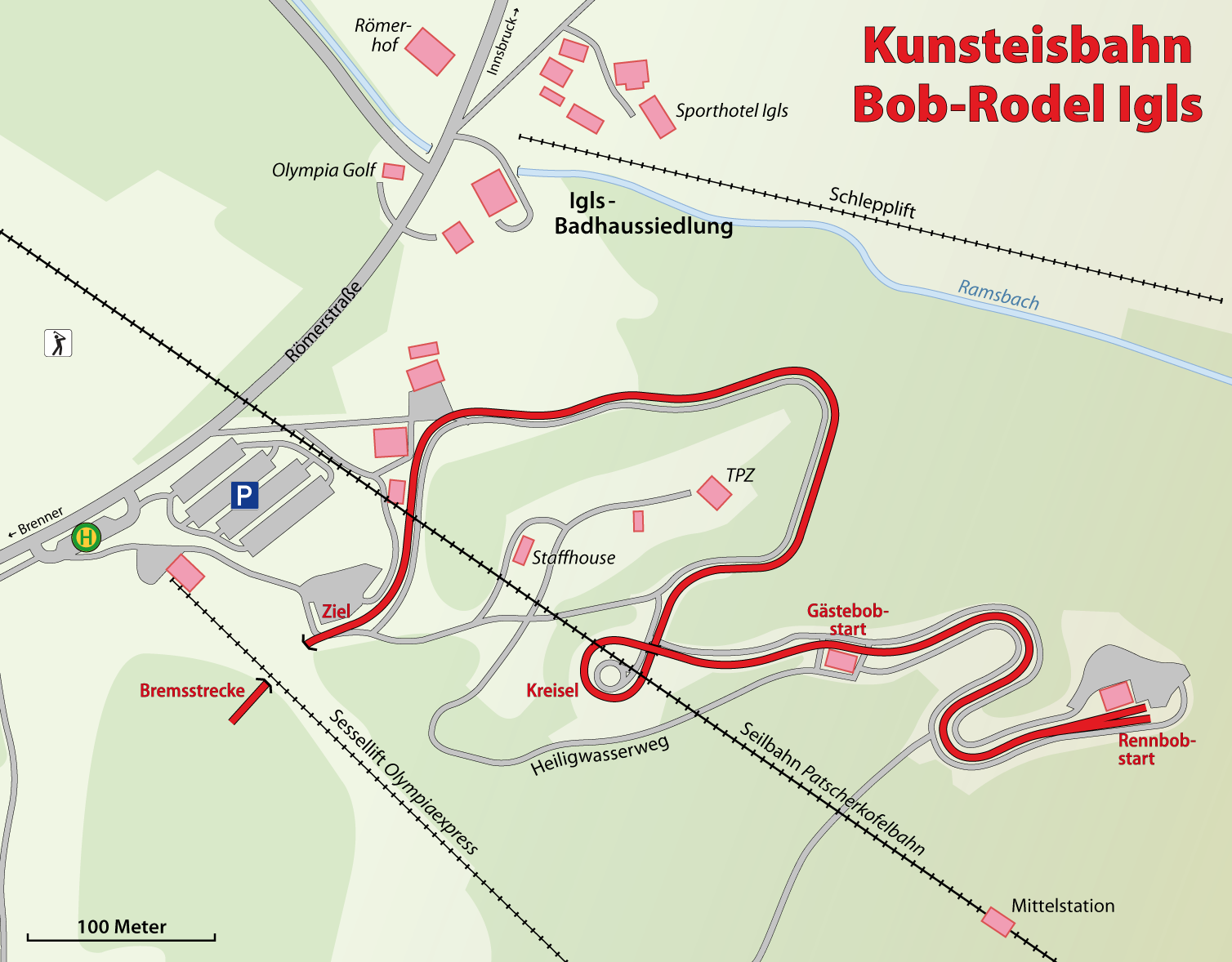
Track map

The Olympic Sliding Centre Innsbruck is a venue for bobsleigh, luge and skeleton located in Igls, Austria (southeast of Innsbruck). The most recent version of the track was completed in 1975 and is the first permanent, combination artificially refrigerated bobsleigh, luge, and skeleton track, serving as a model for other tracks of its kind worldwide. It hosted the bobsleigh, luge, and skeleton competitions for the 2012 Winter Youth Olympics.

== History ==
In 1935, Igls hosted the two-man event of the world bobsleigh championships when the track ran from Römerstrasses to the Patscherkofel valley railroad station. Several fatal accidents at the finishing curve occurred during competition, causing temporarily closure of the track until safety measures were introduced. In 1960, Innsbruck was awarded the 1964 Winter Olympics which led to the construction of separate bobsleigh and luge tracks for the games. Track construction began in September 1961 and was officially completed in July 1963 following test runs of both tracks, including twenty injuries during the 1963 FIBT World Championships on the bobsleigh track. Prior to the start of the 1964 Winter Olympics, British luger Kazimierz Kay-Skrzypeski was killed in a training run on the luge course. When Denver, Colorado, in the United States withdrew in 1972 after being awarded the 1976 Winter Olympics two years earlier for financial reasons, the International Olympic Committee offered the games to 1976 runner-up Whistler, British Columbia in Canada (northeast of Vancouver), but Whistler declined in the wake of the provincial elections in 1972. As a result, the IOC gave the games to Innsbruck. Construction on a new, combined track was started in 1973 under the auspices of the International Bobsleigh and Tobogganing Federation (FIBT) and the International Luge Federation (FIL) and completed the following year. The track was praised by the FIL during testing in 1975 and proved so successful that it fostered a commission with the FIBT and the FIL on construction of combination tracks in 1977 that continues to this day. (Known as homologation, an example of this dual certification process occurred prior to the 2006 Winter Olympics, when adjustments to the track at Cesana Pariol were made following FIL concerns about the run.) The track added a restaurant and was extended in 1981. In 1990–1, the ladies start house at the fifth turn was renovated and the finishing stretch was extended in 1998. The track was part of the OlympiaWorld-Innsbruck in 2004, the same year a general refurbishment was done on the concrete shell. Today, it serves as a training facility for new bobsledders and skeleton racers. It hosted the bobsleigh, luge, and skeleton events for the 2012 Winter Youth Olympics.

== Statistics ==
Modern track
| Sport | Length of track (meters) | Number of turns | Grade |
|---|---|---|---|
| Bobsleigh, skeleton, and Luge - men's singles | 1270 | 14 | 14 |
| Luge - women's singles & men's doubles | 870 | 10 | 8.5% |

The track has a vertical drop of 98.1 meters.

The 1964 Winter Olympic bobsleigh track, designed by former bobsledder and luger Paul Aste, consisted of 14 turns with a total length of 1506.36 meters, a vertical drop of 138 meters, and a maximum grade of 14.04%.

1964 bobsleigh track turns
| Turn Number | Name (German) | Translated name |
|---|---|---|
| 1. | Startkurve | "Start curve" |
| 2., 3. | Hohes S | "High S" curves |
| 4. | Stützenkurve | "Support curve" |
| 5. | Höcker | "Peak" curve |
| 6. | Fuchsloch | "Fox hole" |
| 7. | Hohle Gasses | "Hollow lane" |
| 8. | Schanze | "Dig" |
| 9. | Hexenkessel | "Witch's pot" |
| 10. - 11. | Nadelöhr | "Needle-eye" S curves |
| 12. | Burlepautz | |
| 13. | Weckauf | "Wake on" |
| 14. | Zielkurve | "Finish curve" |

The 1964 Winter Olympic luge track, designed by former bobsledder and luger Paul Aste, consisted of 18 turns with a total length of 1063.76 meters for men singles and a vertical drop of 113.20 meters, and a maximum grade of 18.18%. For women's singles and men's doubles, the length was 910.00 meters with a vertical drop of 86.27 meters

1964 luge track turns
| Turn Number | Name (German) | Translated name |
|---|---|---|
| 1. | Startkurve | |
| 2., 3. | Labyrinth | Two turns in quick succession without a straight (labyrinth) |
| 4. | Waldkurve | "Wood curve" |
| 5. | Stoßwand | "Impact wall" |
| 6. | Gletscherblick | "Glacier view" |
| 7. | Hängematte | "Hammock" |
| 8. | Wasserschlupf | "Water slip" |
| 9. | Promenade | "Promenade" |
| 10. | Fuchsloch | |
| 11. | Koflkehre | - |
| 12. | Schoß | "Shot" |
| 13. - 14. | Mausfalle | "Mouse case" |
| 15. | Olympiakurve | "Olympic curve" |
| 16. | Wassertrog | "Water trough" |
| 17. | Zielgerade | "Finish line curve" |
| 18. | Zielkurve | |

1976 combination track
| Turn Number | Name | Reason named |
|---|---|---|
| 4., 5., 6. | Upper labyrinth | Three turns in quick succession without a straight (labyrinth) |
| 7. | Kreisel | 270-degree Kreisel (circular) curve |
| 11., 12., 13. | Lower labyrinth | Three turns in quick succession without a straight (labyrinth) |

Turns 1–3, 8-10, 14, and 15 have no names listed in the track diagram.

Track records
| Sport | Record | Nation - athlete(s) | Date | Time (seconds) |
|---|---|---|---|---|
| Bobsleigh two-woman | Start | Canada - Kaillie Humphries & Heather Moyse | 22 January 2010 | 5.50 |
| Bobsleigh two-woman | Track | United States - Shauna Rohbock & Michelle Rzepka | 22 January 2010 | 53.47 |
| Luge - men's singles | Start | Johannes Ludwig - Germany | 29 November 2009 | 3.865 |
| Luge - men's singles | Track | David Möller - Germany | 29 November 2008 | 48.533 |
| Luge - women's singles | Start | Tatjana Hüfner - Germany | 28 November 2009 | 2.003 |
| Luge - women's singles | Track | Natalie Geisenberger - Germany | 28 November 2009 | 39.569 |
| Luge - men's doubles | Start | Austria - Markus Schiegl & Tobias Schiegl | 29 November 2008 | 1.927 |
| Luge - men's doubles | Track | Germany - Patric Leitner & Alexander Resch | 28 November 2009 | 39.278 |
| Skeleton - men | Track | Martins Dukurs - Latvia | 3 December 2011 | 52.69 |
| Skeleton - woman | Start | Courtney Yamada - United States; Amy Williams - United Kingdom | 12 December 2008 | 5.33 |
| Skeleton - women | Track | Shelley Rudman - United Kingdom | 12 December 2008 | 54.65 |

== Championships hosted ==
- 1964 Winter Olympics
- 1976 Winter Olympics
- 2012 Winter Youth Olympics
- FIBT World Championships: 1935 (two-man), 1963, 1991 (men's skeleton), 1993 (bobsleigh), 2000 (skeleton), 2016
- FIL European Luge Championships: 1990
- FIL World Luge Championships: 1977, 1987, 1997, 2007, 2017

== See also ==
- Rodelbahn
- OlympiaWorld Innsbruck
