= Matt Weston (skeleton racer) =

English skeleton racer (born 1997)

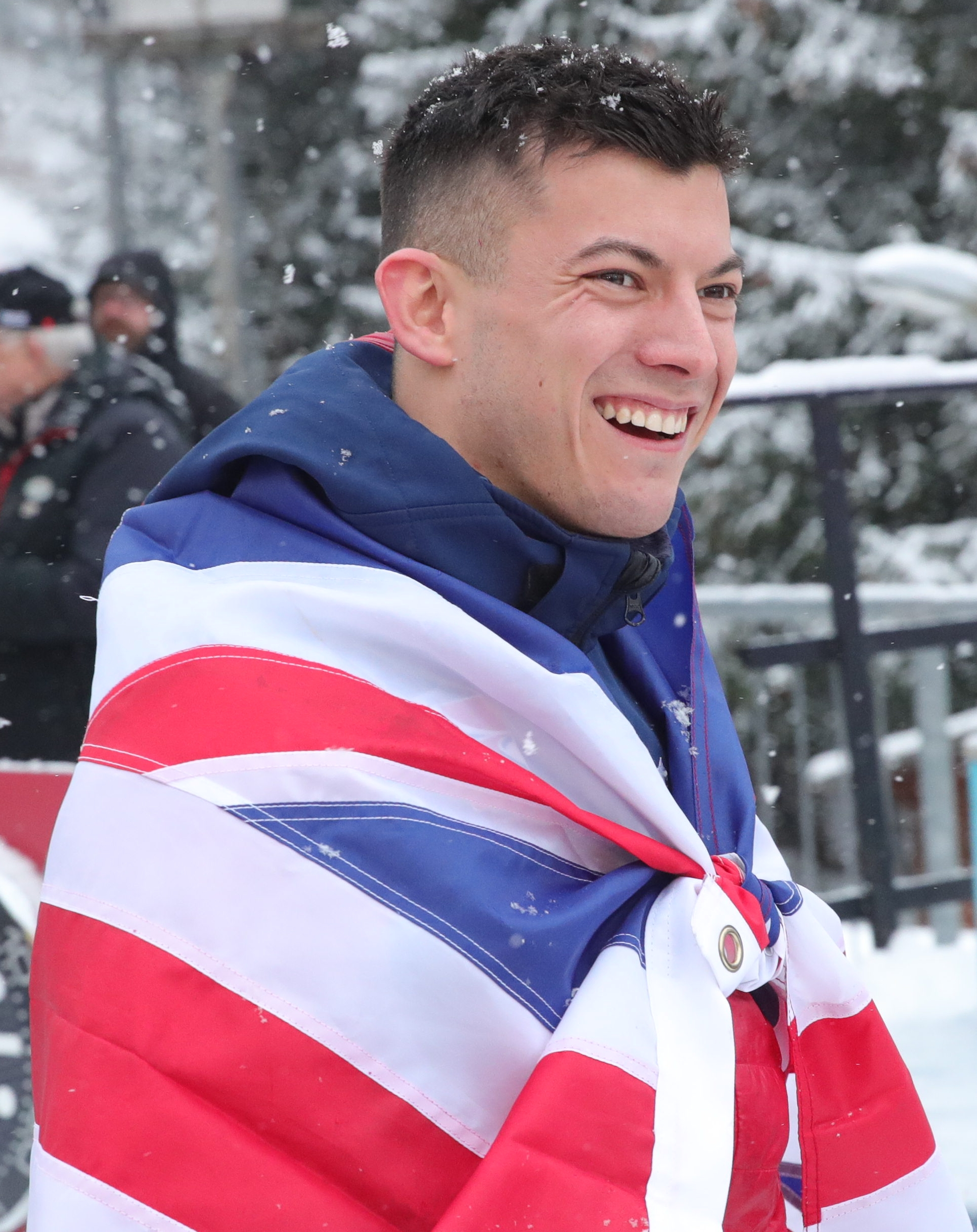
- Weston in 2023

Personal information
- Nationality: British
- Born: 2 March 1997 (age 29) Redhill, Surrey, England
- Height: 182 cm (6 ft 0 in)

Sport
- Sport: Skeleton
Medal record
Skeleton
Representing Great Britain
Olympic Games
Gold medal – first place	2026 Milano Cortina	Men
Gold medal – first place	2026 Milano Cortina	Mixed team
World Championships
Gold medal – first place	2023 St. Moritz	Men
Gold medal – first place	2025 Lake Placid	Men
Silver medal – second place	2023 St. Moritz	Mixed team
Silver medal – second place	2024 Winterberg	Men
Silver medal – second place	2024 Winterberg	Mixed team
Silver medal – second place	2025 Lake Placid	Mixed team
European Championships
Gold medal – first place	2023 Altenberg	Men
Gold medal – first place	2026 St. Moritz	Men
Silver medal – second place	2024 Sigulda	Men
Skeleton World Cup
Gold medal – first place	2023-24 Overall	Men
Gold medal – first place	2024-25 Overall	Men
Gold medal – first place	2025-26 Overall	Men
Silver medal – second place	2022-23 Overall	Men

Matthew Weston (born 2 March 1997) is an English skeleton racer. He is a double Olympic, World and European champion and has won the overall World Cup title on three occasions. Alongside Lizzy Yarnold, Weston is Great Britain's most decorated athlete in Winter Olympic history.

During his youth, Weston competed in taekwondo and rugby before switching to skeleton in 2017 following his participation in UK Sport's Discover your Gold programme. He won his first World Cup race in 2021 and finished in 15th position at the 2022 Winter Olympics. In January 2023, he triumphed in the men's skeleton at the European Championships, and later the same month, won his first world title, becoming the second British man to be crowned world skeleton champion. He won the Skeleton World Cup in 2023–24 and 2024–25, and his victory at the 2025 World Championships made him the first Briton to be a two-time world skeleton champion. In 2026, he won the men's skeleton at the European Championships as well as winning his third overall World Cup title.

Weston won gold in the men's skeleton at the 2026 Winter Olympics in Milano-Cortina. This made him the third Briton, after Amy Williams and Lizzy Yarnold, to win Olympic gold in skeleton. He then won the mixed team event with Tabitha Stoecker, making him the first man to win two Olympic gold medals in skeleton. Weston's successes at the 2026 Games also made him the first British athlete to win more than one gold medal during the same Winter Olympics as well as the first British male athlete to win a gold medal at a Winter Olympics since ice dancer Christopher Dean in 1984. He also became the first British man to win a gold medal in an individual event in any sport at a Winter Olympics since figure skater Robin Cousins in 1980.

== Life and career ==
=== 1997–2018: Early life and introduction to skeleton ===
Weston was born in Redhill, Surrey, and grew up in Crowborough, East Sussex. He attended Bennett Memorial Diocesan School in Royal Tunbridge Wells, Kent, and was a keen rugby player, competing for both Kent and Sevenoaks RFC. Taking inspiration from his father's passion for sports, Weston also competed in taekwondo, entering European and national-level events, where he earned medals at both the 2012 European Cup in Slovakia and the 2014 World Cup event in Brighton. He was forced to quit taekwondo following a stress fracture of the back. In 2017, his fitness coach suggested that he apply for Discover your Gold, a talent identification programme hosted by UK Sport. After undergoing tests, Skeleton was identified as an option for him and he then trained with Royal Marines to test his physical and mental abilities. Weston then trained at the British Bobsleigh and Skeleton Association's centre in Bath, Somerset.

=== 2019–2022: World Cup medals and Olympics disappointment ===
In 2019, Weston competed in skeleton for the first time, and subsequently won two second-tier Europa Cup titles in his first three races. At the 2020 World Championships, he finished in 15th position, 3.65 seconds behind the winner Christopher Grotheer, and at the end of the year, Weston won his first ever Skeleton World Cup medal after securing a silver in Innsbruck. It was his fifth start in a World Cup event and his second-place finish was the highest placing by a British man since Kristan Bromley in 2010. Weston finished 23rd at the 2021 World Championships.

In November 2021, Weston won his first ever World Cup gold medal after finishing in a three-way tie for victory in Innsbruck. He shared victory with German slider Grotheer and Chinese athlete Geng Wenqiang who all recorded the same time. It was the first World Cup victory for a British man since Bromley's win in 2008. Weston was selected to represent Great Britain at the 2022 Winter Olympics in Beijing and arrived at the games as a contender for a medal following a series of top-10 finishes in the lead-up. At the Winter Olympics, he finished in 15th place, 4.23 seconds behind Grotheer in the gold-medal position. After the race, John Jackson, a BBC commentator and former bobsleigh bronze medallist criticised the British teams' sleds as well as the competitors, with Weston himself saying that there would be a review into both his and the teams' performance, stating: "equipment is definitely going to be on the list of the stuff we review." Weston reportedly considered quitting the sport after an Olympic Games where Great Britain failed to win a medal in skeleton having claimed a minimum of one medal at the previous five Games. The appointment of Latvian former world champion Martins Dukurs as a coach by British Skeleton helped convince him to continue.

=== 2022–2026: Double Olympic champion ===
Weston finished third at the season-opening 2022–23 World Cup race in Whistler, before winning a gold medal in the event at Lake Placid. In January, he won a bronze medal in Winterberg, and a gold medal in Altenberg, before triumphing in the European Championships which were also held in Altenberg. There, he finished 0.35 seconds ahead of Grotheer. The following month, he won further races in Innsbruck and Sigulda to finish the World Cup in overall second position. An 18th-place finish earlier in the competition had cost him points as Grotheer claimed overall victory. At the 2023 World Championships in St Moritz, Weston won the men's skeleton world title, becoming Great Britain's second male world champion, and first since Bromley in 2008. He finished the competition 1.79 seconds ahead of Italian slider Amedeo Bagnis. He also finished runner-up in the mixed team event with teammate Laura Deas. The pairing finished the event 0.13 seconds adrift of German gold medallists Grotheer and Susanne Kreher.

In December 2023, Weston finished second at La Plagne in the 2023–24 World Cup, before winning his first World Cup event of the season in Innsbruck. In February, he finished runner-up to Marcus Wyatt at the 2024 European Championships in Sigulda. Weston finished 0.16 seconds behind his compatriot. Later that month, at the 2024 World Championships in Winterberg, Weston finished with silver medals in both the men's skeleton (behind Grotheer), and the mixed team event with Tabby Stoecker (behind Grotheer and Hannah Neise). Later in the World Cup series, he finished third at events in Sigulda and Altenberg. Heading into the final race of the World Cup competition in Lake Placid, Weston trailed Grotheer by 75 points, but a 17th place-finish for the German coupled with a joint-fourth place for Weston gave the Briton the overall World Cup title. He was the first British man to win the series in 16 years. He also became the fourth Briton, after Bromley, Shelley Rudman and Lizzy Yarnold to have won the World Championships, European Championships and the overall World Cup title.

In the 2024–25 World Cup, Weston finished in third position at the first two races that were both held in Pyeongchang. He then won three successive silver medals in the series at Yanqing, Altenberg and Sigulda, before claiming successive victories in Winterberg and St Moritz. He also won a bronze medal in the mixed team event at St Moritz with Amelia Coltman. Arriving at the final race of the competition, Weston needed a top-15 finish to guarantee him the overall World Cup title. He finished eighth, the first race in the series where he failed to finish on the podium, and was crowned the overall World Cup champion for the second successive year. He became the third Briton after Bromley and Alex Coomber to win multiple overall World Cup titles.

In March 2025, Weston was crowned the world champion in Lake Placid; his winning advantage of 1.9 seconds was the second-largest margin in the history of the competition. He recorded the fastest times in both of the first two runs to take a lead of 0.89 seconds at the end of day one. The following day, he set a new track record for the Mt Van Hoevenberg Sliding Center in his third run before securing the title in his fourth. His compatriot Wyatt came second, marking the first time that Great Britain had won two medals in the same event at a skeleton World Championships. He also became the first British skeleton athlete to win two world titles in the sport. He then won a silver medal in the mixed team event with Stoecker. The duo finished 0.1 seconds behind American sliders Ro Mystique and Austin Florian who took gold.

Weston tore a quad muscle eight weeks prior to the beginning of the 2025–26 season, and initially feared that the injury may affect his chances of competing at the forthcoming Olympics. He returned to racing in the World Cup, and won the first race of the series in Cortina to secure his tenth career gold medal in World Cups. He then won another gold at the next leg of the series in Lillehammer, before winning a gold and then a silver at back-to-back events held in Sigulda. In January 2026, Weston set a new track record during his victory in St Moritz, his fourth World Cup win of the season. Later that week, on the same track, Weston won the European Championships for the second time after finishing 0.91 seconds ahead of Bagnis. The event also formed part of the World Cup series. In the final event of the World Cup season in Altenberg, Weston finished joint-second to help secure the overall gold medal for the series and become the first British man to win the competition three times.

At the 2026 Winter Olympics in Milano-Cortina, Weston won the gold medal in the men's skeleton and became the first British man to be an Olympic champion in the sport. He set a new track record in each of his four runs at the Cortina Sliding Centre and finished the event 0.88 seconds ahead of German slider Axel Jungk who finished second. Comparing his gold medal to his previous medals in the sport, Weston said: "winning this blows them all out of the water". Weston also stated that he believed a focus on psychology had been key to his improvement since the previous Olympics, saying: "For me, a lot of the difference is mentality" and explained that he had changed the way he approached races. He said that he has learned to "love the pressure and expectation" that comes with success. His victory was the first by a British man in an individual event at a Winter Olympics since figure skater Robin Cousins won a gold medal in 1980, and the first gold by a British man in any event since Christopher Dean's victory in the ice dance in 1984. His gold medal was the fourth by a British skeleton athlete at an Olympics following Amy Williams success in 2010 and Yarnold's victories in 2014 and 2018.

Weston then won his second medal of the games in the mixed team event where he partnered Stoecker. After Stoecker's run, the duo trailed the German pairing of Jungk and Kreher by 0.18 seconds. Weston successfully made up the deficit as the pair finished 0.17 seconds ahead of the German team with the British duo setting a new track record in the process. He became the first Briton to win two gold medals at a single Games and the second Briton to have won two career gold medals at Winter Olympics after Yarnold who triumphed in both 2014 and 2018. After he had won his second gold medal, it was announced that Weston would undergo surgery on a shoulder injury that he had suffered with during the season. Along with snowboard cross racer Charlotte Bankes, he was named as the flagbearer for Great Britain at the Games' closing ceremony,

Weston was given the freedom of Crowborough to honour his achievements. Weston is engaged and will marry his fiancée in July. In July, the University of Kent announced that they were awarding him an honorary Doctor of the University degree.

== Career results ==
=== Olympic Games ===
Year	Event	Position	Ref
Representing Great Britain
(China) 2022 Beijing	Men's skeleton	15th	
(Italy) 2026 Milano Cortina	Men's skeleton	1st place, gold medalist(s)	
(Italy) 2026 Milano Cortina	Mixed team	1st place, gold medalist(s)	

=== World Championships ===
Event	Men's Skeleton	Mixed Team
Representing Great Britain
(Germany) 2020 Altenberg	15th	4th
(Germany) 2021 Altenberg	23rd	4th
(Switzerland) 2023 St. Moritz	1st	2nd
(Germany) 2024 Winterberg	2nd	2nd
(United States) 2025 Lake Placid	1st	2nd

=== European Championships ===
Year	Event	Location	Position	Ref
2023	Men's skeleton	(Germany) Altenberg	1st	
2024	Men's skeleton	(Latvia) Sigulda	2nd	
2026	Men's skeleton	(Switzerland) St Moritz	1st	

=== Skeleton World Cup ===
Season	Place	Points	1	2	3	4	5	6	7	8
2019–20	34th	120	LKP1 –	LKP2 –	WIN –	LPG –	IGL –	KON –	STM; 13	SIG –
2020–21	9th	994	SIG1; 5	SIG2; 12	IGL1; 4	IGL2; 2	WIN –	STM –	KON; 10	IGL3; 11
2021–22	10th	1073	IGL1; 13	IGL2; 1	ALT1; 12	WIN1; 11	ALT2; 7	SIG; 10	WIN2 –	STM; 9
2022–23	2nd	1605	WHI; 3	PCT; 18	LKP; 1	WIN; 3	ALT1; 1	ALT2; 1	IGL; 1	SIG; 1
2023–24	1st	1523	YAN; 10	LPG; 2	IGL; 1	STM; 4	LIL; 8	SIG; 3	ALT; 3	LKP; 4
2024–25	1st	1640	PYE1; 3	PYE2; 3	YAN; 2	ALT; 2	SIG; 2	WIN; 1	STM; 1	LIL; 8
2025–26	1st	1545	CDA; 1	IGL can.	LIL; 1	SIG; 1	SIG; 2	STM; 1	STM; 1	ALT 2
