= 2023–24 Skeleton World Cup =

Skeleton championship season

Discipline	Men	Women
Overall	(United Kingdom) Matt Weston (1st title)	(Netherlands) Kimberley Bos (2nd title)

Competition
Edition	38th	28th
Locations	8	8

The 2023–24 Skeleton World Cup (official: BMW IBSF Skeleton World Cup) was a multi-race series over a season of skeleton, organised by International Bobsleigh and Skeleton Federation (IBSF). It was the 38th edition for men and 28th edition for women of the highest international race series in skeleton.

The season started on 17 November 2023 in Yanqing, China and ended on 21 March 2024 in Lake Placid, United States.

The highlight of the season was the World Championships in Winterberg, Germany, whose results were not included in the World Cup standings.

Christopher Grotheer from Germany (men's) and Tina Hermann from Germany (women's) were the reigning champions from the previous season.

== Schedule ==
#	Location	Date	Details
1	(China) Yanqing	17 November 2023	
2	(France) La Plagne	8 December 2023	
3	(Austria) Innsbruck-Igls	15 December 2023	
4	(Switzerland) St. Moritz	12 January 2024	
5	(Norway) Lillehammer	26 January 2024	
6	(Latvia) Sigulda	2 February 2024	also European Championships
7	(Germany) Altenberg	16 February 2024	
WCH	(Germany) Winterberg	22–24 February 2024	World Championships (not included in the World Cup)
8	(United States) Lake Placid	21 March 2024	

== Calendar & Standings ==
=== Men ===
#	Place	Winner	Time	Second	Time	Third	Time	R.
1	(China) Yanqing	(Germany) Christopher Grotheer	2:01.20 (1:00.81 / 1:00.39)	(China) Chen Wenhao	2:01.63 (1:00.98 / 1:00.65)	(China) Yan Wengang	2:01.68 (1:00.71 / 1:00.97)	
2	(France) La Plagne	(South Korea) Jung Seung-gi	2:00.61 (1:00.15 / 1:00.46)	(United Kingdom) Matt Weston	2:00.69 (1:00.43 / 1:00.26)	(United Kingdom) Marcus Wyatt (Germany) Christopher Grotheer	2:00.94 (1:00.52 / 1:00.42); 2:00.94 (1:00.23 / 1:00.71)	
3	(Austria) Innsbruck-Igls	(United Kingdom) Matt Weston	1:44.84 (52.56 / 52.28)	(South Korea) Jung Seung-gi	1:44.99 (52.67 / 52.32)	(Germany) Felix Keisinger	1:45.16 (52.78 / 52.38)	
4	(Switzerland) St. Moritz	(Italy) Amedeo Bagnis	2:14.07 (1:07.00 / 1:07.07)	(Germany) Christopher Grotheer	2:14.59 (1:07.56 / 1:07.03)	(South Korea) Jung Seung-gi	2:14.96 (1:07.67 / 1:07.29)	
5	(Norway) Lillehammer	(Germany) Christopher Grotheer	1:42.85 (51.44 / 51.41)	(Germany) Axel Jungk	1:42.93 (51.34 / 51.59)	(Germany) Felix Seibel	1:42.85 (51.34 / 51.61)	
6	(Latvia) Sigulda	(China) Yin Zheng	1:40.82 (50.24 / 50.58)	(United Kingdom) Marcus Wyatt	1:41.00 (50.43 / 50.37)	(United Kingdom) Matt Weston	1:41.16 (50.60 / 50.56)	
7	(Germany) Altenberg	(China) Yin Zheng	1:52.49 (56.29 / 56.20)	(Germany) Christopher Grotheer	1:52.58 (56.25 / 56.33)	(United Kingdom) Matt Weston	1:52.61 (55.83 / 56.78)	
8	(United States) Lake Placid	(China) Yin Zheng	1:46.97 (53.29 / 53.68)	(United Kingdom) Marcus Wyatt	1:47.01 (53.49 / 53.52)	(Italy) Amedeo Bagnis	1:47.34 (53.40 / 53.94)	

==== Overall leaders ====
No.	Holder	Date gained	Place	Date forfeited	Place	Number of competitions
1.	(Germany) Christopher Grotheer	17 November 2023	(China) Yanqing	15 December 2023	(Austria) Innbruck-Igls	2
2.	(South Korea) Jung Seung-gi	15 December 2023	(Austria) Innbruck-Igls	26 January 2024	(Norway) Lillehammer	2
3.	(Germany) Christopher Grotheer	26 January 2024	(Norway) Lillehammer	21 March 2024	(United States) Lake Placid	3
4.	(United Kingdom) Matt Weston	21 March 2024	(United States) Lake Placid	Overall Winner		1

Rank	Racer	Points	(China) YAN	(France) LAP	(Austria) IGL	(Switzerland) STM	(Norway) LIL	(Latvia) SIG	(Germany) ALT	(United States) LAK
1	(United Kingdom) Matt Weston	1523	10	2	1	4	8	3	3	4
2	(Germany) Christopher Grotheer	1494	1	3	5	2	1	9	2	17
3	(China) Yin Zheng	1453	5	19	10	5	4	1	1	1
4	(South Korea) Jung Seung-gi	1269	4	1	2	3	9	17	4	35
5	(United Kingdom) Marcus Wyatt	1254	7	3	9	12	31	2	7	2
6	(Italy) Amedeo Bagnis	1225	13	6	6	1	25	10	10	3
7	(Germany) Felix Keisinger	1200	—	7	3	9	5	4	5	13
8	(Germany) Felix Seibel	1112	—	9	13	7	3	8	6	11
9	(United Kingdom) Craig Thompson	1082	9	5	4	13	12	12	19	15
10	(China) Chen Wenhao	1026	2	18	8	11	11	6	12	—

=== Women ===
#	Place	Winner	Time	Second	Time	Third	Time	R.
1	(China) Yanqing	(Germany) Tina Hermann	2:03.81 (1:01.75 / 1:02.06)	(China) Zhao Dan	2:03.83 (1:01.63 / 1:02.20)	(Canada) Mirela Rahneva	2:03.99 (1:01.90 / 1:02.09)	
2	(France) La Plagne	(United Kingdom) Tabitha Stoecker	2:05.13 (1:02.53 / 1:02.60)	(United States) Mystique Ro	2:05.20 (1:02.70 / 1:02.50)	(Netherlands) Kimberley Bos	2:05.22 (1:02.49 / 1:02.73)	
3	(Austria) Innsbruck-Igls	(Netherlands) Kimberley Bos	1:47.91 (53.93 / 53.98)	(Italy) Valentina Margaglio	1:48.08 (54.02 / 54.06)	(United Kingdom) Tabitha Stoecker	1:48.11 (53.97 / 54.14)	
4	(Switzerland) St. Moritz	(Netherlands) Kimberley Bos	2:18.61 (1:09.81 / 1:08.80)	(Italy) Valentina Margaglio	2:19.34 (1:09.96 / 1:09.38)	(United States) Katie Uhlaender	2:19.45 (1:09.85 / 1:09.60)	
5	(Norway) Lillehammer	(Germany) Hannah Neise	1:45.94 (52.97 / 52.97)	(United States) Mystique Ro	1:45.99 (52.93 / 53.06)	(Netherlands) Kimberley Bos	1:46.00 (53.07 / 52.93)	
6	(Latvia) Sigulda	(Canada) Mirela Rahneva	1:43.10 (51.75 / 51.35)	(Belgium) Kim Meylemans	1:43.38 (51.64 / 51.74)	(Germany) Hannah Neise	1:43.41 (51.87 / 51.54)	
7	(Germany) Altenberg	(Germany) Tina Hermann	1:56.46 (57.90 / 58.56)	(Germany) Susanne Kreher	1:56.56 (58.01 / 58.55)	(United States) Mystique Ro	1:56.70 (58.36 / 58.34)	
8	(United States) Lake Placid	(United States) Mystique Ro	1:50.33 (55.02 / 55.33)	(Belgium) Kim Meylemans	1:50.37 (55.17 / 55.20)	(Netherlands) Kimberley Bos	1:50.55 (55.10 / 55.45)	

==== Overall leaders ====
No.	Holder	Date gained	Place	Date forfeited	Place	Number of competitions
1.	(Germany) Tina Herrmann	17 November 2023	(China) Yanqing	15 December 2023	(Austria) Innbruck-Igls	2
2.	(Netherlands) Kimberley Bos	15 December 2023	(Austria) Innbruck-Igls	Overall Winner		6

Rank	Racer	Points	(China) YAN1	(France) LAP	(Austria) IGL	(Switzerland) STM	(Norway) LIL	(Latvia) SIG	(Germany) ALT	(United States) LAK
1	(Netherlands) Kimberley Bos	1570	8	3	1	1	3	6	5	3
2	(Belgium) Kim Meylemans	1364	5	7	6	13	5	2	14	2
3	(Italy) Valentina Margaglio	1270	9	6	2	2	19	13	9	6
4	(Austria) Janine Flock	1248	6	—	4	7	4	5	7	7
5	(Germany) Tina Hermann	1242	1	9	11	5	14	15	1	15
6	(Germany) Jacqueline Pfeifer	1192	—	4	8	6	9	9	6	5
7	(Germany) Hannah Neise	1177	—	5	9	10	1	3	8	14
8	(United States) Mystique Ro	1175	—	2	19	8	2	16	3	1
9	(Germany) Susanne Kreher	1138	4	DNS	12	4	13	7	2	12
10	(United Kingdom) Tabitha Stoecker	1031	10	14	12	21	3	1	—	8

=== Mixed Team ===
#	Place	Winner	Time	Second	Time	Third	Time	R.
1	(Switzerland) St. Moritz	(Italy) Valentina Margaglio / Amedeo Bagnis	2:22.11 (1:11.95 / 1:10.16)	(Germany) Susanne Kreher / Felix Keisinger	2:23.00 (1:12.17 / 1:10.83)	(Germany) Jacqueline Pfeifer / Felix Seibel	2:23.77 (1:12.66 / 1:11.11)	
2	(Germany) Altenberg	(Germany) Susanne Kreher / Axel Jungk	2:00.92 (1:01.52 / 59.40)	(Czech Republic) Anna Fernstädt / Timon Drahoňovský	2:01.61 (1:01.24 / 1:00.37)	(United States) Katie Uhlaender / Austin Florian (Germany) Hannah Neise / Christopher Grotheer	2:01.66 (1:02.33 / 59.33); 2:01.66 (1:01.77 / 59.89)	

== Podium table by nation ==
Table showing the World Cup podium places (gold–1st place, silver–2nd place, bronze–3rd place) by the countries represented by the athletes.

Rank	Nation	Gold	Silver	Bronze	Total
1	Germany	6	5	6	17
2	China	3	2	1	6
3	Great Britain	2	3	4	9
4	Italy	2	2	1	5
5	Netherlands	2	0	3	5
6	United States	1	2	3	6
7	South Korea	1	1	1	3
8	Canada	1	0	1	2
9	Belgium	0	2	0	2
10	Czech Republic	0	1	0	1
Totals (10 entries)		18	18	20	56

== Points distribution ==
Place	1	2	3	4	5	6	7	8	9	10	11	12	13	14	15	16	17	18	19	20
Men, Women	225	210	200	192	184	176	168	160	152	144	136	128	120	112	104	96	88	80	74	68
