= IBSF World Championships 2023 – Skeleton mixed team =

Skeleton mixed team at the IBSF World Championships 2023
- Venue: St. Moritz-Celerina Olympic Bobrun
- Location: St. Moritz, Switzerland
- Date: 29 January
- Competitors: 36 from 12 nations
- Teams: 18
- Winning time: 2:24.91

Medalists
gold medal	Susanne Kreher; Christopher Grotheer	Germany
silver medal	Laura Deas; Matt Weston	Great Britain
bronze medal	Brogan Crowley; Craig Thompson	Great Britain

The Skeleton mixed team competition at the IBSF World Championships 2023 was held on 29 January 2023.

== Results ==
The race was started at 08:04.

Rank	Bib	Country	Athletes	Time	Behind
1st place, gold medalist(s)	18	Germany 1	Susanne Kreher; Christopher Grotheer	2:24.91	
2nd place, silver medalist(s)	15	Great Britain 1	Laura Deas; Matt Weston	2:25.04	+0.13
3rd place, bronze medalist(s)	13	Great Britain 2	Brogan Crowley; Craig Thompson	2:25.32	+0.41
4	5	Italy 1	Valentina Margaglio; Amedeo Bagnis	2:25.51	+0.60
5	12	China 1	Zhao Dan; Yan Wengang	2:25.83	+0.92
6	14	Canada 1	Mirela Rahneva; Blake Enzie	2:25.98	+1.07
7	17	Germany 2	Tina Hermann; Felix Keisinger	2:26.21	+1.30
8	11	United States 2	Hallie Clarke; Andrew Blaser	2:26.66	+1.75
9	10	China 2	Li Yuxi; Chen Wenhao	2:26.81	+1.90
10	6	Italy 2	Alessia Crippa; Mattia Gaspari	2:26.82	+1.91
11	9	Canada 2	Jane Channell; Evan Neufeldt	2:27.04	+2.13
12	16	United States 1	Kelly Curtis; Austin Florian	2:27.37	+2.46
13	3	Switzerland	Sara Schmied; Basil Sieber	2:27.91	+3.00
14	7	Austria	Anna Saulite; Florian Auer	2:28.54	+3.63
15	2	Australia	Jaclyn Narracott; Peter Makrides	2:29.05	+4.14
16	8	Czech Republic	Anna Fernstädt; Timon Drahoňovský	2:29.45	+4.54
17	4	Liechtenstein	Katharina Eigenmann; Jean Jacques Buff	2:29.84	+4.93
18	1	Spain	Ana Torres-Quevedo; Basil Sieber	2:33.13	+8.22
