= IBSF World Championships 2024 – Men =

Men at the IBSF World Championships 2024
- Venue: Winterberg bobsleigh, luge, and skeleton track
- Location: Winterberg, Germany
- Dates: 22 February (run 1–2); 23 February (run 3–4)
- Competitors: 30 from 18 nations
- Winning time: 3:44.91

Medalists
gold medal	Christopher Grotheer	Germany
silver medal	Matt Weston	Great Britain
bronze medal	Yin Zheng	China

The Men competition at the IBSF World Championships 2024 was held on 22 and 23 February 2024.

== Results ==
The first two runs were started on 22 February at 14:04. The last two runs were held on 23 February at 14:04.

Rank	Bib	Athlete	Country	Run 1	Rank	Run 2	Rank	Run 3	Rank	Run 4	Rank	Total	Behind
1st place, gold medalist(s)	1	Christopher Grotheer	Germany	56.76	1	57.54	4	55.32	1	55.29	2	3:44.91	
2nd place, silver medalist(s)	2	Matt Weston	Great Britain	56.79	2	57.55	5	55.43	2	55.37	3	3:45.14	+0.23
3rd place, bronze medalist(s)	3	Yin Zheng	China	57.40	7	57.63	6	55.50	3	55.39	4	3:45.92	+1.01
4	6	Marcus Wyatt	Great Britain	57.29	6	57.88	13	55.50	3	55.26	1	3:45.93	+1.02
5	10	Axel Jungk	Germany	57.71	10	57.44	2	55.52	5	55.40	5	3:46.07	+1.16
6	5	Felix Keisinger	Germany	57.14	3	58.06	18	55.78	7	55.59	6	3:46.57	+1.66
7	8	Amedeo Bagnis	Italy	57.28	5	57.80	10	55.80	9	55.72	9	3:46.60	+1.69
8	9	Craig Thompson	Great Britain	57.27	4	58.02	17	55.63	6	55.73	10	3:46.65	+1.74
9	15	Austin Florian	United States	57.82	12	57.64	7	55.83	10	55.68	8	3:46.97	+2.06
10	17	Vladyslav Heraskevych	Ukraine	57.82	12	57.50	3	55.86	11	55.82	11	3:47.00	+2.09
11	12	Yan Wengang	China	57.52	8	58.19	22	55.79	8	55.59	6	3:47.09	+2.18
12	7	Chen Wenhao	China	57.94	15	57.36	1	55.94	12	55.87	12	3:47.11	+2.20
13	13	Samuel Maier	Austria	57.77	11	57.65	8	56.01	13	55.96	16	3:47.39	+2.48
14	4	Jung Seung-gi	South Korea	57.62	9	58.30	23	56.02	15	55.90	13	3:47.84	+2.93
15	11	Mattia Gaspari	Italy	57.92	14	57.80	10	56.15	16	55.99	18	3:47.86	+2.95
16	19	Vinzenz Buff	Switzerland	58.35	18	57.77	9	56.01	13	55.98	17	3:48.11	+3.20
16	16	Rasmus Johansen	Denmark	58.07	17	57.84	12	56.28	19	55.92	14	3:48.11	+3.20
18	14	Kim Ji-soo	South Korea	58.03	16	57.90	14	56.21	17	56.10	20	3:48.24	+3.33
19	22	Lucas Defayet	France	58.67	21	57.91	15	56.36	23	56.01	19	3:48.95	+4.04
20	18	Alexander Schlintner	Austria	58.60	20	57.97	16	56.30	21	56.22	21	3:49.09	+4.18
21	21	Livio Summermatter	Switzerland	58.99	23	58.13	19	56.27	18	55.93	15	3:49.32	+4.41
22	20	Daniel Barefoot	United States	58.49	19	58.18	21	56.28	19	56.45	23	3:49.40	+4.49
23	23	Colin Freeling	Belgium	58.69	22	58.35	24	56.33	22	56.44	22	3:49.81	+4.90
24	24	Blake Enzie	Canada	59.13	24	58.14	20	56.53	24	56.47	24	3:50.27	+5.36
25	25	Adrián Rodríguez	Spain	59.67	25	58.73	25	57.19	25	56.91	25	3:52.50	+7.59
26	27	Timon Drahoňovský	Czech Republic	59.80	26	59.85	26	57.42	27	Did not advance			
27	30	Yaroslav Lavreniuk	Ukraine	1:00.22	28	1:00.50	27	57.25	26	Did not advance			
28	26	Akwasi Frimpong	Ghana	59.87	27	1:01.02	30	57.73	28	Did not advance			
29	28	Chiang Chun-hung	Chinese Taipei	1:00.42	29	1:00.81	28	57.80	29	Did not advance			
30	29	Vladyslav Polyvach	Poland	1:00.79	30	1:00.86	29	58.02	30	Did not advance			
	31	Ryan Kuehn	Canada	Did not start									
