= 2022–23 Skeleton World Cup =

Skeleton championship season

Winners
- Men's: Christopher Grotheer (GER) (1)
- Women's: Tina Hermann (GER) (2)

Competitions
- Venues: 7 (8 events)

The 2022–23 Skeleton World Cup was an upcoming multi-race series over a season for skeleton. The season started in Whistler, Canada on 25 November 2022 and finished in Sigulda, Latvia on 17 February 2023. The season sponsor was BMW.

== Calendar ==
Below is the schedule of the 2022/23 season.

| Venue | Date | Details |
|---|---|---|
| (Canada) Whistler | 25 November 2022 | |
| (United States) Park City | 2 December 2022 | |
| (United States) Lake Placid | 16 December 2022 | |
| (Germany) Winterberg | 6 January 2023 | |
| (Germany) Altenberg | 13 January 2023 | |
| (Germany) Altenberg | 20 January 2023 | also European Championships |
| (Switzerland) St. Moritz | 26–28 January 2023 | World Championships (Doesn't count towards the World Cup standings) |
| (Austria) Innsbruck-Igls | 10 February 2023 | |
| (Latvia) Sigulda | 17 February 2023 | |

== Results ==
=== Men ===
| Event: | Gold: | Time | Silver: | Time | Bronze: | Time |
|---|---|---|---|---|---|---|
| (Canada) Whistler | Marcus Wyatt; Great Britain | 1:45.44 (52.86 / 52.58) | Jung Seung-gi; South Korea | 1:45.45 (52.87 / 52.58) | Matt Weston; Great Britain | 1:46.10 (52.84 / 53.26) |
| (United States) Park City | Christopher Grotheer; Germany | 1:36.26 (48.14 / 48.12) | Jung Seung-gi; South Korea | 1:36.43 (48.18 / 48.25) | Marcus Wyatt; Great Britain | 1:36.63 (48.35 / 48.28) |
| (United States) Lake Placid | Matt Weston; Great Britain | 1:48.16 (53.74 / 54.42) | Christopher Grotheer; Germany | 1:48.32 (54.19 / 54.13) | Jung Seung-gi; South Korea | 1:48.40 (54.11 / 54.29) |
| (Germany) Winterberg | Christopher Grotheer; Germany | 1:54.32 (56.88 / 57.44) | Axel Jungk; Germany | 1:54.71 (56.88 / 57.83) | Matt Weston; Great Britain | 1:54.72 (57.12 / 57.60) |
| (Germany) Altenberg 1 | Matt Weston; Great Britain | 1:52.44 (56.19 / 56.25) | Christopher Grotheer; Germany | 1:52.58 (56.11 / 56.47) | Axel Jungk; Germany | 1:52.94 (56.15 / 56.79) |
| (Germany) Altenberg 2 | Matt Weston; Great Britain | 1:54.16 (57.15 / 57.01) | Christopher Grotheer; Germany | 1:54.51 (57.52 / 56.99) | Axel Jungk; Germany | 1:54.54 (57.67 / 56.87) |
| (Austria) Innsbruck | Matt Weston; Great Britain | 1:42.96 (51.55 / 51.41) | Jung Seung-gi; South Korea | 1:43.32 (51.75 / 51.57) | Chen Wenhao; China | 1:43.45 (51.76 / 51.69) |
| (Latvia) Sigulda | Matt Weston; Great Britain | 1:40.39 (50.27 / 50.12) | Marcus Wyatt; Great Britain | 1:40.75 (50.44 / 50.31) | Christopher Grotheer; Germany | 1:41.02 (50.59 / 50.43) |

=== Women ===
| Event: | Gold: | Time | Silver: | Time | Bronze: | Time |
|---|---|---|---|---|---|---|
| (Canada) Whistler | Hannah Neise; Germany | 1:47.40 (53.71 / 53.69) | Hallie Clarke; United States | 1:47.58 (53.45 / 54.13) | none awarded | |
| (Canada) Whistler | Hannah Neise; Germany | 1:47.40 (53.71 / 53.69) | Brogan Crowley; Great Britain | 1:47.58 (53.91 / 53.67) | none awarded | |
| (United States) Park City | Mirela Rahneva; Canada | 1:38.42 (49.12 / 49.30) | Tina Hermann; Germany | 1:38.52 (49.21 / 49.31) | Laura Deas; Great Britain | 1:38.55 (49.41 / 49.14) |
| (United States) Lake Placid | Tina Hermann; Germany | 1:51.06 (55.47 / 55.59) | Susanne Kreher; Germany | 1:51.37 (55.50 / 55.87) | Kelly Curtis; United States | 1:51.39 (55.79 / 55.60) |
| (Germany) Winterberg | Kimberley Bos; Netherlands | 1:57.18 (58.68 / 58.50) | Mirela Rahneva; Canada | 1:57.24 (58.60 / 58.64) | Hannah Neise; Germany | 1:57.34 (58.82 / 58.52) |
| (Germany) Altenberg 1 | Tina Hermann; Germany | 1:56.23 (58.05 / 58.18) | Susanne Kreher; Germany | 1:57.27 (58.67 / 58.60) | Kimberley Bos; Netherlands | 1:57.45 (59.08 / 58.37) |
| (Germany) Altenberg 2 | Tina Hermann; Germany | 1:56.52 (58.34 / 58.18) | Janine Flock; Austria | 1:57.14 (58.51 / 58.63) | Susanne Kreher; Germany | 1:57.15 (58.57 / 58.58) |
| (Austria) Innsbruck | Kimberley Bos; Netherlands | 1:46.35 (53.48 / 52.87) | Hallie Clarke; United States | 1:46.63 (53.18 / 53.45) | Kim Meylemans; Belgium | 1:46.68 (53.37 / 53.31) |
| (Latvia) Sigulda | Tina Hermann; Germany | 1:43.65 (51.49 / 52.16) | Laura Deas; Great Britain | 1:43.70 (51.91 / 51.79) | Kim Meylemans; Belgium | 1:43.88 (51.92 / 51.96) |

== Standings ==
=== Men ===
| Pos. | Racer | (Canada) WHI | (United States) PCT | (United States) LPL | (Germany) WIN | (Germany) ALT 1 | (Germany) ALT 2 | (Austria) IGL | (Latvia) SIG | Points |
|---|---|---|---|---|---|---|---|---|---|---|
| 1 | Christopher Grotheer (GER) | 5 | 1 | 2 | 1 | 2 | 2 | 4 | 3 | 1656 |
| 2 | Matt Weston (GBR) | 3 | 18 | 1 | 3 | 1 | 1 | 1 | 1 | 1605 |
| 3 | Marcus Wyatt (GBR) | 1 | 3 | 4 | 4 | 6 | 5 | 9 | 2 | 1531 |
| 4 | Jung Seung-gi (KOR) | 2 | 2 | 3 | 13 | 4 | 7 | 2 | 7 | 1478 |
| 5 | Axel Jungk (GER) | 4 | 7 | 5 | 2 | 3 | 3 | 7 | 10 | 1466 |
| 6 | Kim Ji-soo (KOR) | 11 | 5 | 7 | 5 | 7 | 11 | 6 | 8 | 1312 |
| 7 | Felix Keisinger (GER) | 7 | 4 | 8 | 7 | 8 | 14 | 8 | 5 | 1304 |
| 8 | Austin Florian (USA) | 9 | 6 | 6 | 9 | 11 | 4 | 13 | 16 | 1200 |
| 9 | Chen Wenhao (CHN) | – | 9 | 10 | 11 | 5 | 6 | 3 | 9 | 1144 |
| 10 | Yin Zheng (CHN) | – | 10 | 9 | 12 | 10 | 8 | 5 | 6 | 1088 |

=== Women ===
| Pos. | Racer | (Canada) WHI | (United States) PCT | (United States) LPL | (Germany) WIN | (Germany) ALT 1 | (Germany) ALT 2 | (Austria) IGL | (Latvia) SIG | Points |
|---|---|---|---|---|---|---|---|---|---|---|
| 1 | Tina Hermann (GER) | 6 | 2 | 1 | 4 | 1 | 1 | 10 | 1 | 1622 |
| 2 | Kimberley Bos (NED) | 5 | 7 | 5 | 1 | 3 | 5 | 1 | 4 | 1562 |
| 3 | Mirela Rahneva (CAN) | 7 | 1 | 8 | 2 | 4 | 4 | 4 | 6 | 1515 |
| 4 | Susanne Kreher (GER) | 10 | 4 | 2 | 6 | 2 | 3 | 7 | 5 | 1484 |
| 5 | Hannah Neise (GER) | 1 | 6 | 6 | 3 | – | 10 | 11 | 7 | 1225 |
| 6 | Kelly Curtis (USA) | 11 | 5 | 3 | 11 | 9 | 7 | 13 | 17 | 1184 |
| 7 | Anna Fernstädt (CZE) | 4 | 11 | 10 | 15 | 7 | 9 | 17 | 10 | 1128 |
| 8 | Jane Channell (CAN) | 8 | 19 | 13 | 10 | 11 | 6 | 14 | 9 | 1074 |
| 9 | Laura Deas (GBR) | 12 | 3 | 11 | – | 5 | DNS | 6 | 2 | 1034 |
| 10 | Brogan Crowley (GBR) | 2 | 13 | 9 | – | 16 | 8 | 12 | 8 | 1026 |

== Medal table ==
| Rank | Nation | Gold | Silver | Bronze | Total |
|---|---|---|---|---|---|
| 1 | Germany | 7 | 7 | 5 | 19 |
| 2 | Great Britain | 6 | 3 | 4 | 13 |
| 3 | Netherlands | 2 | 0 | 1 | 3 |
| 4 | Canada | 1 | 1 | 0 | 2 |
| 5 | South Korea | 0 | 3 | 1 | 4 |
| 6 | United States | 0 | 2 | 1 | 3 |
| 7 | Austria | 0 | 1 | 0 | 1 |
| 8 | Belgium | 0 | 0 | 2 | 2 |
| 9 | China | 0 | 0 | 1 | 1 |
| Totals (9 entries) | | 16 | 17 | 15 | 48 |

== Points ==
| Place | 1 | 2 | 3 | 4 | 5 | 6 | 7 | 8 | 9 | 10 | 11 | 12 | 13 | 14 | 15 | 16 | 17 | 18 | 19 | 20 |
| Individual | 225 | 210 | 200 | 192 | 184 | 176 | 168 | 160 | 152 | 144 | 136 | 128 | 120 | 112 | 104 | 96 | 88 | 80 | 74 | 68 |
