= Skeleton at the 2022 Winter Olympics – Women's =

Skeleton women's at the XXIV Olympic Winter Games
- Skeleton
- Venue: Xiaohaituo Bobsleigh and Luge Track; Beijing
- Date: 11, 12 February 2022
- Competitors: 25 from 17 nations
- Winning time: 4:07.62

Medalists
1st place, gold medalist(s)		Hannah Neise	Germany
2nd place, silver medalist(s)		Jaclyn Narracott	Australia
3rd place, bronze medalist(s)		Kimberley Bos	Netherlands

The women's competition in skeleton at the 2022 Winter Olympics was held on 11 February (runs 1 and 2) and 12 February (runs 3 and 4), at the Xiaohaituo Bobsleigh and Luge Track in Yanqing District of Beijing. Hannah Neise of Germany became the Olympic champion. Jaclyn Narracott of Australia won silver, and Kimberley Bos of the Netherlands bronze. For all of them these were their first Olympic medals, moreover, Narracott's and Bos's medals were the first Olympic medals in skeleton for Australia and the Netherlands. Bos's bronze was the first medal for the Netherlands in an ice sport that doesn't involve any type of skating.

Because Christopher Grotheer won gold in the men's skeleton, Neise's gold meant that Germany swept the golds in Skeleton at these Olympics. This was also the first time in the history of women's skeleton at the Olympics that no British athlete won a medal. A British woman had previously won a medal at every women's skeleton Olympic competition since it was introduced in 2002.

== Background ==
The 2014 and 2018 champion Lizzy Yarnold retired from competitions. The silver medalist, Jacqueline Lölling, and the bronze medalist, Laura Deas, both qualified for the Olympics. Tina Hermann was the 2021 World champion. Lölling and Elena Nikitina are the silver and bronze medalists, respectively. Kimberley Bos won the 2021–22 Skeleton World Cup, followed by Janine Flock and Nikitina.

== Qualification ==
A total of 25 quota spots were available to athletes to compete at the games. A maximum of three athletes could be entered by a NOC.

The World Ranking list as of January 16, 2022 was used to distribute the quotas. Athletes were ranked by their best seven results. A total of two countries in each gender would qualify the maximum of three athletes, while four countries would qualify two athletes and 11 countries would qualify one quota. If the host nation China failed to qualify in an event, the highest ranked sled from the country was to take the last qualification slot. An athlete had to be ranked within the top 55 to be eligible to compete at the games.

== Results ==
Rank	Bib	Athlete	Country	Run 1	Rank 1	Run 2	Rank 2	Run 3	Rank 3	Run 4	Rank 4	Total	Behind
1st place, gold medalist(s)	15	Hannah Neise	Germany	1:02.36	8	1:02.19	1	1:01.44	1	1:01.63	1	4:07.62	–
2nd place, silver medalist(s)	18	Jaclyn Narracott	Australia	1:02.05	2	1:02.29	3	1:01.79	3	1:02.11	4	4:08.24	+0.62
3rd place, bronze medalist(s)	4	Kimberley Bos	Netherlands	1:02.51	10	1:02.22	2	1:01.86	4	1:01.87	2	4:08.46	+0.84
4	7	Tina Hermann	Germany	1:02.28	5	1:02.29	3	1:01.90	5	1:02.26	6	4:08.73	+1.11
5	11	Mirela Rahneva	Canada	1:02.03	1	1:03.14	18	1:01.72	2	1:02.26	6	4:09.15	+1.53
6	16	Katie Uhlaender	United States	1:02.41	9	1:02.46	8	1:02.15	6	1:02.21	5	4:09.23	+1.61
7	19	Anna Fernstädtová	Czech Republic	1:02.35	6	1:02.44	6	1:02.27	10	1:02.26	6	4:09.32	+1.70
8	14	Jacqueline Lölling	Germany	1:02.27	4	1:02.45	7	1:02.22	7	1:02.41	14	4:09.35	+1.73
9	3	Zhao Dan	China	1:02.26	3	1:02.40	5	1:02.53	16	1:02.33	9	4:09.52	+1.90
10	6	Janine Flock	Austria	1:02.64	14	1:02.72	10	1:02.23	8	1:02.45	15	4:10.04	+2.42
11	8	Yulia Kanakina	ROC	1:02.56	11	1:02.95	13	1:02.24	9	1:02.34	10	4:10.09	+2.47
12	9	Valentina Margaglio	Italy	1:02.84	17	1:03.04	15	1:02.45	14	1:02.05	3	4:10.38	+2.76
13	2	Nicole Silveira	Brazil	1:02.58	12	1:02.95	13	1:02.55	17	1:02.40	13	4:10.48	+2.86
14	21	Li Yuxi	China	1:02.64	14	1:02.62	9	1:02.39	12	1:02.94	19	4:10.59	+2.97
15	10	Alina Tararychenkova	ROC	1:02.74	16	1:02.86	11	1:02.43	13	1:02.79	17	4:10.82	+3.20
16	5	Elena Nikitina	ROC	1:02.92	18	1:03.07	17	1:02.51	15	1:02.37	12	4:10.87	+3.25
17	13	Jane Channell	Canada	1:02.59	13	1:03.31	22	1:02.71	19	1:02.34	10	4:10.95	+3.33
18	12	Kim Meylemans	Belgium	1:02.35	6	1:02.92	12	1:02.34	11	1:03.73	20	4:11.34	+3.72
19	1	Laura Deas	Great Britain	1:02.99	21	1:03.15	19	1:02.71	19	1:02.70	16	4:11.55	+3.93
20	23	Endija Tērauda	Latvia	1:02.98	20	1:03.15	19	1:02.65	18	1:02.79	17	4:11.57	+3.95
21	17	Kelly Curtis	United States	1:02.94	19	1:03.05	16	1:03.24	23	Did not advance		3:09.23	N/A
22	20	Brogan Crowley	Great Britain	1:03.32	23	1:03.23	21	1:02.82	21	Did not advance		3:09.37	N/A
23	24	Kim Eun-ji	South Korea	1:03.28	22	1:03.68	23	1:02.83	22	Did not advance		3:09.79	N/A
24	22	Kellie Delka	Puerto Rico	1:04.83	24	1:04.47	24	1:04.55	24	Did not advance		3:13.85	N/A
25	25	Katie Tannenbaum	Virgin Islands	1:06.48	25	1:07.36	25	1:04.84	25	Did not advance		3:18.68	N/A
