= IBSF World Championships 2023 – Men =

Men at the IBSF World Championships 2023
- Venue: St. Moritz-Celerina Olympic Bobrun
- Location: St. Moritz, Switzerland
- Dates: 26–27 January
- Competitors: 36 from 21 nations
- Winning time: 4:28.71

Medalists
gold medal	Matt Weston	Great Britain
silver medal	Amedeo Bagnis	Italy
bronze medal	Jung Seung-gi	South Korea

The Men competition at the IBSF World Championships 2023 was held on 26 and 27 January 2023.

== Results ==
The first two runs were started on 26 January at 09:04 and the last two runs on 27 January at 09:00.

Rank	Bib	Athlete	Country	Run 1	Rank	Run 2	Rank	Run 3	Rank	Run 4	Rank	Total	Behind
1st place, gold medalist(s)	8	Matt Weston	Great Britain	1:07.08	1	1:06.88	1	1:07.81	1	1:06.94	1	4:28.71	
2nd place, silver medalist(s)	20	Amedeo Bagnis	Italy	1:07.55	2	1:07.54	5	1:08.29	3	1:07.12	2	4:30.50	+1.49
3rd place, bronze medalist(s)	6	Jung Seung-gi	South Korea	1:07.88	4	1:07.39	2	1:08.31	4	1:07.59	3	4:31.17	+2.46
4	14	Craig Thompson	Great Britain	1:07.91	5	1:07.43	3	1:08.18	2	1:07.66	5	4:31.18	+2.47
5	9	Marcus Wyatt	Great Britain	1:07.77	3	1:07.49	4	1:08.48	6	1:07.64	4	4:31.38	+2.67
6	1	Yan Wengang	China	1:08.00	7	1:07.66	7	1:08.49	7	1:07.67	6	4:31.82	+3.11
7	18	Mattia Gaspari	Italy	1:08.13	10	1:07.63	6	1:08.39	5	1:07.83	7	4:31.98	+3.27
8	4	Kim Ji-soo	South Korea	1:07.96	6	1:07.82	9	1:08.61	8	1:08.19	10	4:32.58	+3.87
9	2	Chen Wenhao	China	1:08.23	11	1:07.71	8	1:08.68	9	1:08.04	9	4:32.66	+3.95
10	10	Christopher Grotheer	Germany	1:08.04	8	1:07.83	10	1:09.06	18	1:07.92	8	4:32.85	+4.14
11	11	Yin Zheng	China	1:08.30	12	1:07.96	13	1:09.08	19	1:08.22	11	4:33.56	+4.85
12	3	Felix Keisinger	Germany	1:08.45	14	1:08.09	14	1:08.88	10	1:08.38	13	4:33.80	+5.09
13	12	Vladyslav Heraskevych	Ukraine	1:08.50	16	1:08.12	15	1:08.91	12	1:08.31	12	4:33.84	+5.13
14	13	Florian Auer	Austria	1:08.47	15	1:08.31	18	1:08.90	11	1:08.46	14	4:34.14	+5.43
15	22	Basil Sieber	Switzerland	1:08.37	13	1:08.34	19	1:09.18	21	1:08.46	14	4:34.35	+5.64
16	27	Cedric Renner	Germany	1:08.08	9	1:07.93	12	1:09.47	26	1:09.04	19	4:34.52	+5.81
17	21	Samuel Maier	Austria	1:08.77	17	1:08.25	17	1:08.92	13	1:08.65	17	4:34.59	+5.88
18	7	Axel Jungk	Germany	1:09.13	25	1:07.88	11	1:09.03	16	1:08.58	16	4:34.62	+5.91
19	5	Austin Florian	United States	1:08.82	18	1:08.14	16	1:09.35	23	1:08.77	18	4:35.08	+6.37
20	15	Alexander Schlintner	Austria	1:09.12	23	1:08.41	21	1:09.04	17	1:09.43	20	4:36.00	+7.29
21	19	Rasmus Johansen	Denmark	1:09.12	23	1:08.61	23	1:08.96	14	Did not advance			
22	26	Jean Jacques Buff	Liechtenstein	1:08.87	20	1:08.93	24	1:08.98	15	Did not advance			
23	16	Blake Enzie	Canada	1:09.13	25	1:08.53	22	1:09.15	20	Did not advance			
24	34	Vinzenz Buff	Switzerland	1:08.84	19	1:08.94	25	1:09.18	21	Did not advance			
25	17	Andrew Blaser	United States	1:09.09	22	1:08.40	20	1:09.76	28	Did not advance			
26	23	Daniel Barefoot	United States	1:09.06	21	1:09.73	31	1:09.38	24	Did not advance			
27	25	Evan Neufeldt	Canada	1:09.64	29	1:09.20	28	1:09.38	24	Did not advance			
28	24	Lucas Defayet	France	1:09.29	27	1:08.99	26	1:10.64	30	Did not advance			
29	28	Colin Freeling	Belgium	1:10.22	30	1:09.42	29	1:09.75	27	Did not advance			
30	30	Timon Drahoňovský	Czech Republic	1:09.40	28	1:09.69	30	1:10.83	32	Did not advance			
31	33	Adrián Rodríguez	Spain	1:10.47	31	1:09.18	27	1:11.34	33	Did not advance			
32	36	Jonathan Yaw	Malaysia	1:11.35	36	1:10.27	32	1:10.16	29	Did not advance			
33	31	Brendan Doyle	Ireland	1:10.86	33	1:10.36	33	1:10.79	31	Did not advance			
34	35	Peter Makrides	Australia	1:10.99	34	1:10.62	34	1:11.42	34	Did not advance			
35	29	Akwasi Frimpong	Ghana	1:10.84	32	1:11.05	35	1:11.84	35	Did not advance			
36	32	Jeff Bauer	Luxembourg	1:11.12	35	1:11.26	36	1:12.74	36	Did not advance			
