= Skeleton at the 2026 Winter Olympics – Men's =

Skeleton men's at the XXV Olympic Winter Games
- Skeleton
- Venue: Cortina Sliding Centre; Cortina d'Ampezzo
- Date: 12, 13 February 2026
- Competitors: 24 from 15 nations
- Winning time: 3:43:33

Medalists
1st place, gold medalist(s)		Matt Weston	Great Britain
2nd place, silver medalist(s)		Axel Jungk	Germany
3rd place, bronze medalist(s)		Christopher Grotheer	Germany

The men's competition in skeleton at the 2026 Winter Olympics was held on 12 February (runs 1 and 2) and 13 February (runs 3 and 4), at the Cortina Sliding Centre in Cortina d'Ampezzo. Matt Weston of Great Britain won the event, setting a new track record in every run. This was his first Olympic medal. Axel Jungk of Germany won the silver medal, replicating his 2022 performance. His teammate Christopher Grotheer, the defending champion, won bronze. Weston became the third British athlete to win an Olympic title in skeleton after Lizzy Yarnold and Amy Williams and the first male British skeleton athlete to do so. Weston also became the first male British athlete in any winter sport to win an Olympic gold medal in an individual Olympic competition since figure skater Robin Cousins did so in 1980.

== Background ==
The defending champion, Christopher Grotheer, qualified for the event, as did the silver medalist, Axel Jungk. The bronze medalist, Yan Wengang, did not qualify. Matt Weston won the 2025–26 Skeleton World Cup, having won all six events that season. He was also the 2025 World champion.

Ukrainian racer Vladyslav Heraskevych was disqualified before his first run for wearing a helmet depicting Ukrainian athletes killed during Russia's invasion of Ukraine. The International Olympic Committee prohibits any personal messages at the Olympics.

== Results ==
Rank	Bib	Athlete	Country	Run 1	Rank 1	Run 2	Rank 2	Run 3	Rank 3	Run 4	Rank 4	Total	Behind
1st place, gold medalist(s)	1	Matt Weston	Great Britain	56.21 TR	1	55.88 TR	1	55.63 TR	1	55.61 TR	1	3:43:33	–
2nd place, silver medalist(s)	4	Axel Jungk	Germany	56.27	2	56.12	2	55.72	2	56.10	5	3:44:21	+0.88
3rd place, bronze medalist(s)	10	Christopher Grotheer	Germany	56.39	4	56.16	3	55.92	=3	55.93	2	3:44:40	+1.07
4	7	Chen Wenhao	China	56.43	5	56.25	4	55.96	6	55.95	3	3:44:59	+1.26
5	8	Amedeo Bagnis	Italy	56.37	3	56.38	6	55.92	=3	56.07	4	3:44:74	+1.41
6	9	Felix Keisinger	Germany	56.44	6	56.53	8	55.93	5	56.24	=7	3:45:14	+1.81
7	2	Yin Zheng	China	56.56	8	56.66	11	56.08	7	56.25	9	3:45:55	+2.22
8	14	Lin Qinwei	China	56.89	=12	56.33	5	56.21	9	56.18	6	3:45:61	+2.28
9	3	Marcus Wyatt	Great Britain	56.52	7	56.69	12	56.32	10	56.24	=7	3:45:77	+2.44
10	6	Jung Seung-gi	South Korea	56.57	9	56.65	10	56.19	8	56.49	11	3:45:90	+2.57
11	15	Rasmus Vestergaard Johansen	Denmark	56.82	11	56.52	7	56.52	11	56.45	10	3:46:31	+2.98
12	13	Austin Florian	United States	56.95	14	56.59	9	56.54	12	56.51	12	3:46:59	+3.26
13	12	Mattia Gaspari	Italy	56.73	10	56.72	13	56.79	13	56.55	14	3:46:79	+3.46
14	5	Samuel Maier	Austria	56.89	=12	57.23	19	56.55	14	56.53	13	3:47:20	+3.87
15	21	Vinzenz Buff	Switzerland	57.27	16	57.02	16	56.80	15	56.87	16	3:47:96	+4.63
16	17	Kim Ji-soo	South Korea	57.15	15	57.00	15	57.03	16	56.93	17	3:48:11	+4.78
17	22	Florian Auer	Austria	57.53	19	56.91	14	57.06	18	56.86	15	3:48:36	+5.03
18	20	Emīls Indriksons	Latvia	57.29	17	57.11	17	56.95	17	57.15	18	3:48:50	+5.17
19	16	Lucas Defayet	France	57.63	20	57.66	21	57.21	20	57.19	19	3:49:69	+6.36
20	23	Dan Barefoot	United States	57.47	18	57.22	16	57.75	19	57.42	=21	3:49:86	+6.53
21	19	Nicholas Timmings	Australia	58.26	24	57.57	20	57.18	21	57.21	20	3:50:22	+6.89
22	24	Jared Firestone	Israel	58.15	23	57.74	22	57.83	22	57.63	23	3:51:35	+8.02
23	25	Hiroatsu Takahashi	Japan	58.06	21	58.46	24	57.69	24	57.42	=21	3:51:63	+8.30
24	18	Josip Brusic	Canada	58.14	22	58.40	23	57.54	23	58.24	24	3:52:32	+8.99
DSQ	11	Vladyslav Heraskevych	Ukraine										
Official results
