= Kimberley Bos =

Dutch skeleton racer (born 1993)

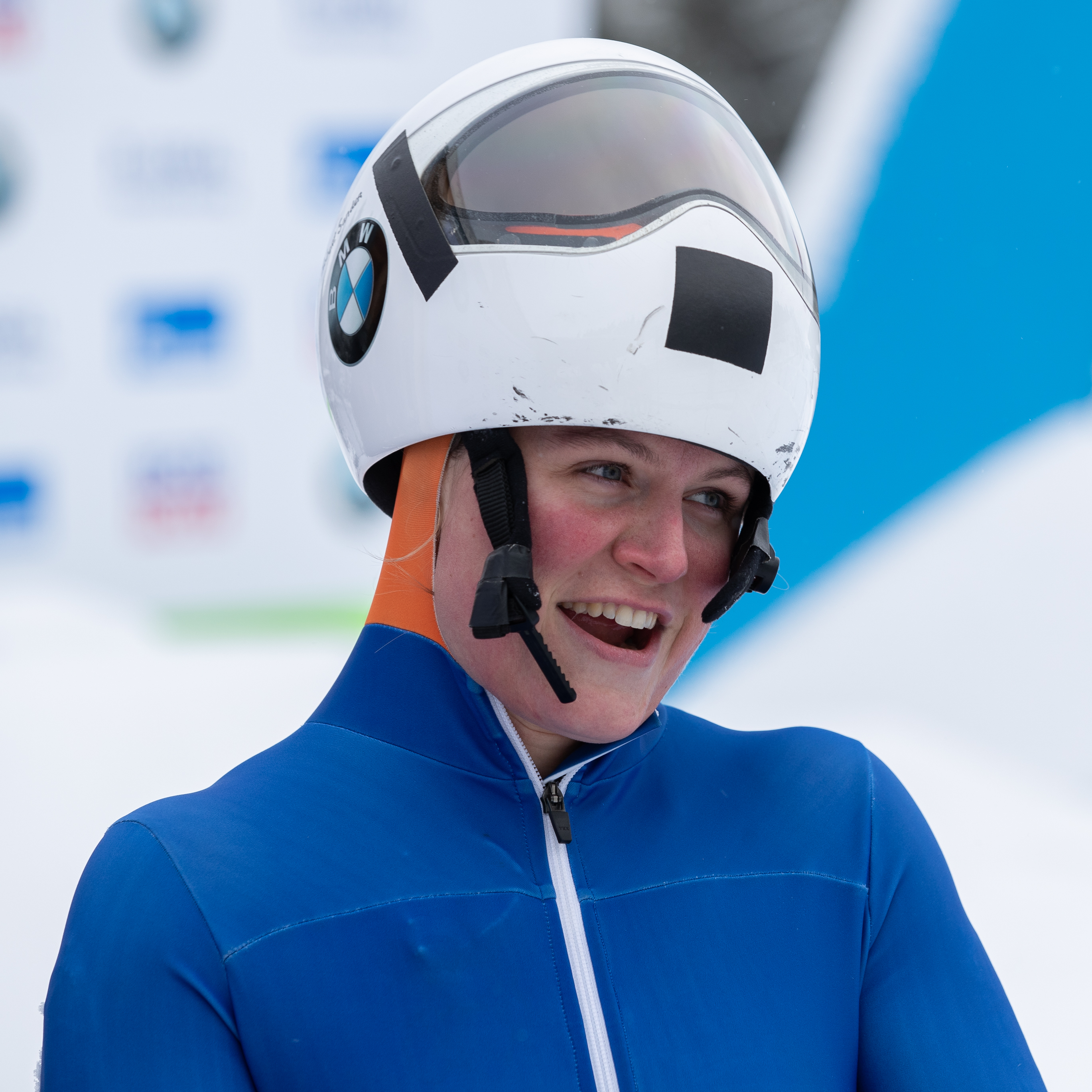
- Bos in 2020

Personal information
- Nationality: Dutch
- Born: 7 October 1993 (age 32) Ede, Netherlands
- Height: 170 cm (5 ft 7 in)
- Weight: 70 kg (154 lb)
- Website: kimberleybos.nl

Sport
- Country: Netherlands
- Sport: Bobsleigh (2010–2013), Skeleton (2013–present)

Achievements and titles
- Olympic finals: 3rd (Beijing 2022)
- World finals: World champion 2025
Medal record
Women's skeleton
Representing the Netherlands
Olympic Games
Bronze medal – third place	2022 Beijing	Women
World Championships
Gold medal – first place	2025 Lake Placid	Women
Silver medal – second place	2023 St. Moritz	Women
European Championships
Gold medal – first place	2022 St. Moritz	Women
Bronze medal – third place	2025 Lillehammer	Women
Junior World Championships
Silver medal – second place	2016 Winterberg	Women
Bobsleigh
Youth Olympic Games
Bronze medal – third place	2012 Innsbruck	Two girls

Kimberley Bos (born 7 October 1993) is a Dutch skeleton racer who competes on the Skeleton World Cup circuit. She started competing internationally in 2009, originally in bobsleigh, and was selected to the Dutch national team in 2010; she switched to skeleton for the 2013–14 European Cup season. Her personal coach is Urta Rozenstruik, and she rides a Bromley sled. Away from the track, Bos is a physiotherapy student, occasionally serving as "unofficial physio" to the other athletes. Bos was the only woman named to represent the Netherlands in skeleton at the 2018 Winter Olympics in Pyeongchang, where she finished eighth. Bos returned for the 2022 Winter Olympics in Beijing, where she won the bronze medal becoming the first Dutch olympic medal winner in a sliding sport.

== Notable results ==
Bos's first official result in international competition was a bobsleigh qualification race for the 2012 Winter Youth Olympics, held the previous November at the Olympic Sliding Centre Innsbruck, in which she and brakewoman Mandy Groot finished fourth. In three subsequent qualification races (with Groot and Sanne Dekker trading off brakewoman duties), she finished second, earning a qualifying spot to the 2012 games. At the games, Bos and Groot earned a bronze medal behind a British sled and the other Dutch team (see Bobsleigh at the 2012 Winter Youth Olympics). Bos and Groot finished 13th later that month at the Bobsleigh Junior World Championships, also at the Innsbruck track, again behind their Dutch teammates.

After a string of poor performances in the 2012–13 season, including five non-results on the Europe and North American Cup tours, Bos switched to skeleton racing for the 2013–14 season. She had much more success in skeleton, making the cut in every single race on the Europe Cup she started, ending her 2015–16 season with four straight gold-medal finishes on North American Cup races at Park City and Lake Placid. Bos also placed in the top 10 in eight of nine Intercontinental Cup races in 2015–16 and won two ICC races at Igls to start the 2016–17 season before moving up to the World Cup level.

Bos finished fifth at the Skeleton Junior World Championships for 2017 in Sigulda, after finishing second at the same event the previous year. At the 2017 Senior World Championships in Königssee, Bos finished 14th, down from 8th the previous year. She finished seventh in the 2017 World Cup race at Winterberg, also the European championships, in which she was fifth after discounting the two non-European competitors ahead of her. Her best finish on the World Cup was a bronze medal in 2017 at the Olympic test event in Pyeongchang, and she finished the 2016–17 season ranked 12th overall. In the 2018 European Championships, held in December 2017 at Igls, Bos again finished fifth.

== World Cup results ==
All results are sourced from the International Bobsleigh and Skeleton Federation (IBSF).

Season	1	2	3	4	5	6	7	8	9	Points	Place
2017–18	LPL; 12	PAC; 10	WHI; 16	WIN; 24	IGL; 7	ALT; 7	STM; 20	KON; 17	—N/a	1306	14th
2018–19	SIG; 9	WIN; 9	ALT; 16	KON; CNX	IGL; 17	STM; 8	LKP; 14	CAL1; 13	CAL2; 15	984	13th
2019–20	LPL 1; 17	LPL 1 DNS	WIN -	LPG -	IGL; 24	KON; 19	STM -	SIG 1; 9	—N/a	359	24th
2020–21	SIG 1; 2	SIG 2; 3	IGL 1; 2	IGL 2; 2	WIN; 7	STM -	KON; 12	IGL 3; 3	—N/a	1326	3rd
2021–22	IGL 1; 2	IGL 2; 2	ALT 1; 6	WIN 1; 1	ALT 2; 10	SIG; 3	WIN 2; 1	STM; 2	—N/a	1600	1st
2022–23	WHI; 5	PAC; 7	LPL; 5	WIN; 1	ALT 1; 3	ALT 2; 5	IGL; 1	SIG; 4	—N/a	1562	2nd
2023–24	YAN; 8	LAP; 3	IGL; 1	STM; 1	LIL; 3	SIG; 6	ALT; 5	LAK; 5	—N/a	1570	1st
2024–25	PYE 1; 9	PYE 2; 8	YAN; 6	ALT; 5	SIG; 1	WIN; 4	STM; 5	LIL; 4	—N/a	1465	2nd
2025–26	COR; 11	IGL; CNX	LIL; 7	SIG1; 5	SIG2; 8	WIN; 24	STM; 9	ALT; 4	—N/a	1037	8th

Olympic Games
Preceded by Femke Bol; Harrie Lavreysen	Flag bearer for the Netherlands; 2026 opening ceremony With: Jens van 't Wout	Succeeded by Jorrit Bergsma; Xandra Velzeboer
