= 2021–22 Skeleton World Cup =

Skeleton competition

Winners
- Men's: Martins Dukurs (LAT) (11)
- Women's: Kimberley Bos (NED) (1)

Competitions
- Venues: 5 (8 events)

The 2021–22 Skeleton World Cup was a multi-race series over a season for skeleton. The season started on 19 November 2021 at Innsbruck-Igls, Austria, and finished at St. Moritz, Switzerland on 14 January 2022.

== Calendar ==
Below is the schedule of the 2021/22 season.

| Venue | Date | Details |
|---|---|---|
| (Austria) Innsbruck-Igls 1 | 19 November 2021 | |
| (Austria) Innsbruck-Igls 2 | 26 November 2021 | |
| (Germany) Altenberg 1 | 3 December 2021 | |
| (Germany) Winterberg 1 | 10 December 2021 | |
| (Germany) Altenberg 2 | 17 December 2021 | |
| (Latvia) Sigulda | 31 December 2021 | |
| (Germany) Winterberg 2 | 7 January 2022 | Due to non-compliance with the sweeping protocol, Men's first run results were cancelled and race was shortened to one (second) run |
| (Switzerland) St. Moritz | 14 January 2022 | also European Championships |

== Results ==
=== Men ===
| Event: | Gold: | Time | Silver: | Time | Bronze: | Time |
|---|---|---|---|---|---|---|
| (Austria) Innsbruck-Igls 1 | Alexander Tretiakov; Russia | 1:45.07 (52.74 / 52.33) | Martins Dukurs; Latvia | 1:45.14 (52.64 / 52.50) | Christopher Grotheer; Germany | 1:45.23 (52.73 / 52.50) |
| (Austria) Innsbruck-Igls 2 | Geng Wenqiang; China | 1:46.04 (53.10 / 52.94) | none awarded | | | |
| (Austria) Innsbruck-Igls 2 | Christopher Grotheer; Germany | 1:46.04 (53.16 / 52.88) | none awarded | | | |
| (Austria) Innsbruck-Igls 2 | Matt Weston; Great Britain | 1:46.04 (53.09 / 52.95) | none awarded | | | |
| (Germany) Altenberg 1 | Axel Jungk; Germany | 1:51.71 (55.87 / 55.84) | Christopher Grotheer; Germany | 1:51.82 (55.77 / 56.05) | Martins Dukurs; Latvia | 1:52.16 (56.05 / 56.11) |
| (Germany) Winterberg 1 | Alexander Tretiakov; Russia | 1:51.05 (55.55 / 55.50) | Axel Jungk; Germany | 1:51.34 (55.67 / 55.67) | Christopher Grotheer; Germany | 1:51.64 (55.94 / 55.70) |
| (Germany) Altenberg 2 | Martins Dukurs; Latvia | 1:53.90 (57.02 / 56.88) | Axel Jungk; Germany | 1:54.09 (56.79 / 57.30) | Christopher Grotheer; Germany | 1:54.31 (57.03 / 57.28) |
| (Latvia) Sigulda | Tomass Dukurs; Latvia | 1:41.36 (50.67 / 50.69) | Martins Dukurs; Latvia | 1:41.42 (50.31 / 51.11) | Jung Seung-gi; South Korea | 1:41.73 (50.64 / 51.09) |
| (Germany) Winterberg 2 | Martins Dukurs; Latvia | 56.36 | Axel Jungk; Germany | 56.37 | Alexander Tretiakov; Russia | 56.41 |
| (Switzerland) St. Moritz | Martins Dukurs; Latvia | 2:14.39 (1:07.01 / 1:07.38) | Alexander Gassner; Germany | 2:14.84 (1:07.46 / 1:07.38) | Christopher Grotheer; Germany | 2:14.90 (1:07.43 / 1:07.47) |

=== Women ===
| Event: | Gold: | Time | Silver: | Time | Bronze: | Time |
|---|---|---|---|---|---|---|
| (Austria) Innsbruck-Igls 1 | Elena Nikitina; Russia | 1:47.49 (53.87 / 53.62) | Kimberley Bos; Netherlands | 1:47.59 (53.87 / 53.72) | Kim Meylemans; Belgium | 1:47.62 (53.75 / 53.87) |
| (Austria) Innsbruck-Igls 2 | Elena Nikitina; Russia | 1:47.83 (53.80 / 54.03) | Kimberley Bos; Netherlands | 1:48.03 (54.03 / 54.00) | Valentina Margaglio; Italy | 1:48.28 (54.30 / 53.98) |
| (Germany) Altenberg 1 | Tina Hermann; Germany | 1:55.36 (57.84 / 57.52) | Alina Tararychenkova; Russia | 1:55.67 (58.05 / 57.62) | Janine Flock; Austria | 1:55.73 (58.12 / 57.61) |
| (Germany) Winterberg 1 | Kimberley Bos; Netherlands | 1:53.68 (56.98 / 56.70) | Tina Hermann; Germany | 1:53.93 (57.02 / 56.91) | Mirela Rahneva; Canada | 1:53.97 (57.08 / 56.89) |
| (Germany) Altenberg 2 | Tina Hermann; Germany | 1:59.03 (59.50 / 59.53) | Valentina Margaglio; Italy | 1:59.14 (59.64 / 59.50) | Yulia Kanakina; Russia | 1:59.45 (59.54 / 59.91) |
| (Latvia) Sigulda | Janine Flock; Austria | 1:44.64 (52.15 / 52.49) | Yulia Kanakina; Russia | 1:44.81 (52.46 / 52.35) | Kimberley Bos; Netherlands | 1:44.98 (52.71 / 52.27) |
| (Germany) Winterberg 2 | Kimberley Bos; Netherlands | 1:56.04 (57.88 / 58.16) | Jacqueline Lölling; Germany | 1:56.28 (58.37 / 57.91) | Elena Nikitina; Russia | 1:56.47 (58.53 / 57.94) |
| (Switzerland) St. Moritz | Jaclyn Narracott; Australia | 2:17.56 (1:08.72 / 1:08.84) | Kimberley Bos; Netherlands | 2:17.62 (1:08.89 / 1:08.73) | Mirela Rahneva; Canada | 2:18.22 (1:09.23 / 1:08.99) |

== Standings ==
=== Men ===
| Pos. | Racer | (Austria) IGL 1 | (Austria) IGL 2 | (Germany) ALT 1 | (Germany) WIN 1 | (Germany) ALT 2 | (Latvia) SIG | (Germany) WIN 2 | (Switzerland) STM | Points |
|---|---|---|---|---|---|---|---|---|---|---|
| 1 | Martins Dukurs (LAT) | 2 | 11 | 3 | 4 | 1 | 2 | 1 | 1 | 1623 |
| 2 | Axel Jungk (GER) | 4 | 5 | 1 | 2 | 2 | 12 | 2 | 4 | 1551 |
| 3 | Christopher Grotheer (GER) | 3 | 1 | 2 | 3 | 3 | 8 | 9 | 3 | 1547 |
| 4 | Nikita Tregubov (RUS) | 10 | 6 | 5 | 6 | 6 | 7 | 7 | 4 | 1384 |
| 5 | Vladislav Semenov (RUS) | 5 | 7 | 4 | 13 | 9 | 8 | 7 | 6 | 1320 |
| 6 | Alexander Gassner (GER) | 8 | 21 | 6 | 5 | 10 | 5 | 4 | 2 | 1312 |
| 7 | Alexander Tretiakov (RUS) | 1 | 9 | 9 | 1 | 4 | – | 3 | 8 | 1306 |
| 8 | Tomass Dukurs (LAT) | 16 | 18 | 7 | 7 | 8 | 1 | 5 | 7 | 1249 |
| 9 | Jung Seung-gi (KOR) | 7 | 4 | 22 | 11 | 16 | 3 | 11 | 13 | 1104 |
| 10 | Matt Weston (GBR) | 13 | 1 | 12 | 11 | 7 | 10 | – | 9 | 1073 |

=== Women ===
| Pos. | Racer | (Austria) IGL 1 | (Austria) IGL 2 | (Germany) ALT 1 | (Germany) WIN 1 | (Germany) ALT 2 | (Latvia) SIG | (Germany) WIN 2 | (Switzerland) STM | Points |
|---|---|---|---|---|---|---|---|---|---|---|
| 1 | Kimberley Bos (NED) | 2 | 2 | 6 | 1 | 10 | 3 | 1 | 2 | 1600 |
| 2 | Janine Flock (AUT) | 6 | 7 | 3 | 7 | 4 | 1 | 8 | 4 | 1481 |
| 3 | Elena Nikitina (RUS) | 1 | 1 | 11 | 6 | 6 | 5 | 3 | 11 | 1458 |
| 4 | Tina Hermann (GER) | 8 | 12 | 1 | 2 | 1 | 6 | 7 | 10 | 1436 |
| 5 | Yulia Kanakina (RUS) | 12 | 5 | 7 | 14 | 3 | 2 | 4 | 16 | 1290 |
| 6 | Valentina Margaglio (ITA) | 5 | 3 | DNF | 8 | 2 | 8 | 6 | 5 | 1274 |
| 7 | Alina Tararychenkova (RUS) | 4 | 4 | 2 | 18 | 11 | 7 | 15 | 13 | 1202 |
| 8 | Mirela Rahneva (CAN) | 14 | 11 | 18 | 3 | 11 | 13 | 5 | 3 | 1168 |
| 9 | Hannah Neise (GER) | 18 | 10 | 4 | 9 | 7 | 16 | 14 | 8 | 1104 |
| 10 | Jacqueline Lölling (GER) | 11 | 21 | 9 | 4 | 13 | 17 | 2 | 12 | 1088 |

== Medal table ==
| Rank | Nation | Gold | Silver | Bronze | Total |
|---|---|---|---|---|---|
| 1 | Germany | 4 | 7 | 4 | 15 |
| 2 | Russia | 4 | 2 | 3 | 9 |
| 3 | Latvia | 4 | 2 | 1 | 7 |
| 4 | Netherlands | 2 | 3 | 1 | 6 |
| 5 | Austria | 1 | 0 | 1 | 2 |
| 6 | Australia | 1 | 0 | 0 | 1 |
| 6 | China | 1 | 0 | 0 | 1 |
| 6 | Great Britain | 1 | 0 | 0 | 1 |
| 9 | Italy | 0 | 1 | 1 | 2 |
| 10 | Canada | 0 | 0 | 2 | 2 |
| 11 | Belgium | 0 | 0 | 1 | 1 |
| 11 | South Korea | 0 | 0 | 1 | 1 |
| Totals (12 entries) | | 18 | 15 | 15 | 48 |

== Points ==
| Place | 1 | 2 | 3 | 4 | 5 | 6 | 7 | 8 | 9 | 10 | 11 | 12 | 13 | 14 | 15 | 16 | 17 | 18 | 19 | 20 |
| Individual | 225 | 210 | 200 | 192 | 184 | 176 | 168 | 160 | 152 | 144 | 136 | 128 | 120 | 112 | 104 | 96 | 88 | 80 | 74 | 68 |
