= Neise =

Neise is a surname. Notable people with the surname include:

- George N. Neise (1917–1996), American actor
- Hannah Neise (born 2000), German skeleton racer
