= IBSF Junior World Championships Skeleton 2025 =

- Venue: St. Moritz-Celerina Olympic Bobrun
- Location: St. Moritz, Switzerland
- Dates: 17–18 January

The IBSF Junior World Championships Skeleton 2025 took place from 17 to 18 January 2025 at the St. Moritz-Celerina Olympic Bobrun in St. Moritz, Switzerland.

== Medal summary ==
Event	Gold		Silver		Bronze	
Men's	Lukas Nydegger; Germany	2:16.72	Rasmus Johansen; Denmark	2:16.90	Livio Summermatter; Switzerland	2:18.42
Women's	Hallie Clarke; Canada	2:19.46	Sara Schmied; Switzerland	2:20.34	Aline Pelckmans; Belgium	2:20.40
Men's U20	Yaroslav Lavreniuk; Ukraine	2:18.70	Emīls Indriksons; Latvia	2:18.72	Valentino Buff; Switzerland	2:19.82
Women's U20	Sara Schmied; Switzerland	2:20.34	Cosima Sebastian; Germany	2:20.57	Sarah Baumgartner; Austria	2:21.32
Mixed team	Germany; Viktoria Hansova; Lukas Nydegger	2:24.57	Switzerland; Sara Schmied; Livio Summermatter	2:25.45	Denmark; Nanna Johansen; Rasmus Johansen	2:25.66

== Medal table ==
* Host nation (Switzerland)

Rank	Nation	Gold	Silver	Bronze	Total
1	Germany	2	1	0	3
2	Switzerland*	1	2	2	5
3	Canada	1	0	0	1
3	Ukraine	1	0	0	1
5	Denmark	0	1	1	2
6	Latvia	0	1	0	1
7	Austria	0	0	1	1
7	Belgium	0	0	1	1
Totals (8 entries)		5	5	5	15
