= IBSF Junior World Championships Skeleton 2026 =

- Venue: Altenberg bobsleigh, luge, and skeleton track
- Location: Altenberg, Germany
- Dates: 12–13 March 2026

The IBSF Junior World Championships Skeleton 2026 took place from 12 to 13 March 2026 at the Altenberg bobsleigh, luge, and skeleton track in Altenberg, Germany.

== Medal summary ==
Event	Gold		Silver		Bronze	
Men's	Yaroslav Lavreniuk; Ukraine	1:53.52	Dāvis Valdovskis; Latvia	1:53.70	Yu Guoqing; China	1:54.28
Women's	Viktoria Hansova; Germany	1:56.16	Marie Angerer; Germany	1:56.20	Cosima Sebastian; Germany	1:56.40
Men's U20	Yaroslav Lavreniuk; Ukraine	1:53.52	Dāvis Valdovskis; Latvia	1:53.70	Yu Guoqing; China	1:54.28
Women's U20	Marie Angerer; Germany	1:56.20	Cosima Sebastian; Germany	1:56.40	Liang Yuxin; China	1:56.91
Mixed team	Germany; Marie Angerer; Martin Buchheim	2:04.75	Latvia; Kamila Krustiņa; Renārs Jumiķis	2:05.53	Individual Neutral Athletes; Polina Knyazeva; Eremei Zykov	2:05.65

== Medal table ==
* Host nation (Germany)

Rank	Nation	Gold	Silver	Bronze	Total
1	Germany*	3	2	1	6
2	Ukraine	2	0	0	2
3	Latvia	0	3	0	3
4	China	0	0	3	3
5	Individual Neutral Athletes	0	0	1	1
Totals (5 entries)		5	5	5	15
