= Susanne Kreher =

German skeleton racer (born 1998)

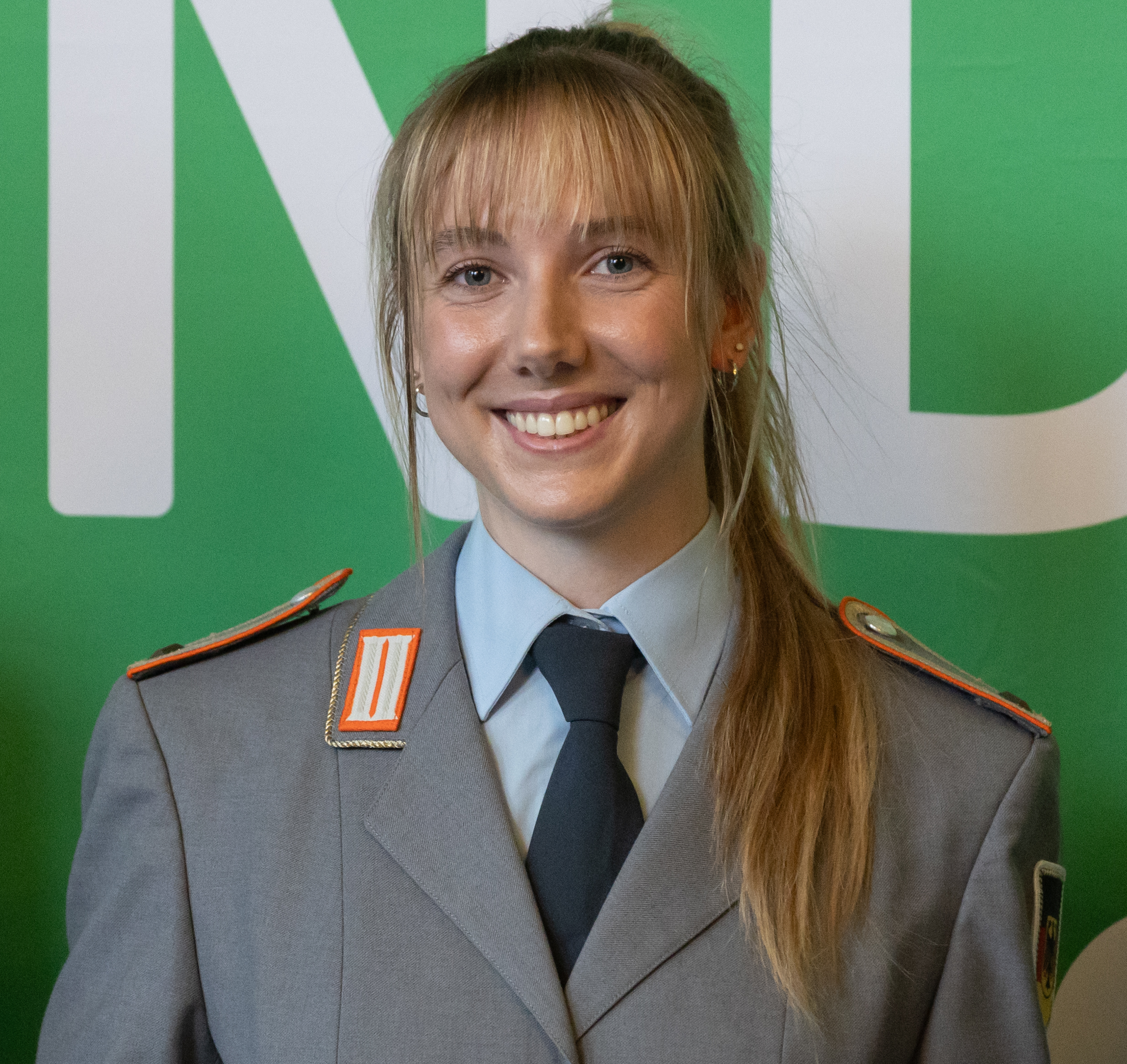
- Kreher in 2026

Personal information
- Nationality: German
- Born: 20 December 1998 (age 27) Meschede, Germany
- Height: 172 cm (5 ft 8 in)
- Weight: 62 kg (137 lb)

Sport
- Country: Germany
- Sport: Skeleton
- Club: BSC Sachsen Oberbärenburg
- Turned pro: 2015
- Coached by: David Friedrich
Medal record
Women's skeleton
Representing Germany
Olympic Games
Silver medal – second place	2026 Milano Cortina	Women
Silver medal – second place	2026 Milano Cortina	Mixed team
World Championships
Gold medal – first place	2023 St. Moritz	Women
Gold medal – first place	2023 St. Moritz	Mixed team
European Championships
Gold medal – first place	2026 St. Moritz	Mixed team
Bronze medal – third place	2023 Altenberg	Women
Junior World Championships
Gold medal – first place	2022 Innsbruck	Women
Silver medal – second place	2020 Winterberg	Women
Silver medal – second place	2021 St. Moritz	Women
Bronze medal – third place	2018 St. Moritz	Women
World Cup
Event	1st	2nd	3rd
Women	0	3	1
Mixed team	1	1	0
Total	1	4	1
- updated as of 17 February 2023

Susanne Kreher (born 20 December 1998) is a German skeleton racer who has competed since 2015. At the 2026 Winter Olympics, she won silver medals in the women's and mixed team events.

== Career ==
Susanne Kreher switched from athletics to skeleton in 2015 and competes for BSC Sachsen Oberbärenburg, where she is trained by David Friedrich, the state coach of Saxony. She made her debut in the European Skeleton Cup on 10 November 2016 in Innsbruck on the Olympia Eiskanal Igls, finishing sixth. Her first and so far only victory in the European Cup was on 12 January 2018 on her home track in Altenberg.

In 2018, she qualified the first time for the Skeleton Junior World Championships, which were held in 2018 at the St. Moritz. She secured the bronze medal behind Anna Fernstädt and Yulia Kanakina. In the 2018/19 season, she started to compete in the Intercontinental Cup and made her debut on 23 November 2018 in Winterberg. She finished sixth in her first competition and she was able to win her third race in the Intercontinental Cup. She won the Park City competition on 19 January 2019 ahead of Anna Fernstädt and Kelly Curtis. She also managed to win the last race of the season on 20 January 2019 in Lake Placid.

Before the 2019/20 season, she secured the bronze medal at the German Skeleton Championships behind Tina Hermann and Jacqueline Lölling on 9 November 2019. In the 2019/20 season she started to compete in the Intercontinental Cup and won the first two competitions on the Olympic track in Sochi. In addition, she also won the race in Winterberg on 7 December 2019 and it was her fifth consecutive victory in the Intercontinental Cup. At the end of the season, she finished second in the 2019–20 Intercontinental Cup standings behind Kelly Curtis.

Susanne Kreher contested her debut in the World Cup on 17 January 2020, because Sophia Griebel was out due to illness. Her debut competition in Innsbruck, she took sixth place and got 176 world cup points. This race was her sole world cup race in this season and she completed 28th place in the overall World Cup. At the Skeleton Junior World Championships 2020, which were held in the Veltins Eisarena in Winterberg, she took second place behind Anna Fernstädt and ahead of Hannah Neise. She sustained an injury during the competition and thus missed the opportunity to qualify for the 2020 Bobsleigh and Skeleton World Championships in Altenberg.

In 2022, Kreher competed and won Gold at the Junior World Championships in Innsbruck, Austria.

== Career results ==
All results are sourced from the International Bobsleigh and Skeleton Federation (IBSF).

=== Olympic Games ===
Event	Women	Skeleton mixed team
(Italy) 2026 Milano Cortina	2nd	2nd

=== World Championships ===
Event	Women	Skeleton mixed team
(Switzerland) 2023 St. Moritz	1st	1st
(Germany) 2024 Winterberg	10th	—
(United States) 2025 Lake Placid	6th	5th

=== World Cup results ===
Season	1	2	3	4	5	6	7	8	Points	Place
2019–20	—	—	—	—	6	—	—	—	176	28th
2020–21	—	—	—	—	—	—	—	11	136	31st
2022–23	10	4	2	6	2	3	7	5	1484	4th
