= Yaroslav Lavreniuk =

Ukrainian skeleton racer

Personal information
- Nationality: Ukrainian
- Born: 1 November 2007 (age 18) Zhytomyr, Ukraine
- Height: 1.80 m (5 ft 11 in)
- Weight: 65 kg (143 lb)

Sport
- Sport: Skeleton
Medal record
Men's skeleton
Representing Ukraine
Winter Youth Olympics
Silver medal – second place	2024 Gangwon	Men's
Junior World Championships
Gold medal – first place	2026 Altenberg	Men's
World U20 Championships
Gold medal – first place	2025 St. Moritz	Men's
Gold medal – first place	2026 Altenberg	Men's
Bronze medal – third place	2024 Lillehammer	Men's
European U20 Championships
Bronze medal – third place	2025 Sigulda	Men's

Yaroslav Lavreniuk (Ukrainian: Ярослав Лавренюк; born 1 November 2007) is a Ukrainian skeleton racer.

== Career ==
Lavreniuk was born in Zhytomyr. In February 2023, he won two silver medals at the OMEGA Youth Series Competition in men's skeleton event.

He competed at the OMEGA Youth Series Competition, held in Innsbruck and Pyongyang in November 2023, where he received silver and bronze medals in men's skeleton event. At this competition he qualified at the 2024 Winter Youth Olympics.

At the 2024 IBSF World Junior Championships, held in Lillehammer, Norway, Yaroslav won a bronze medal in men's skeleton event.

Then he represented Ukraine at the 2024 Winter Youth Olympics, held in Gangwon, South Korea and won a silver medal in men's skeleton event. That is the second medal and a first silver medal in Ukrainian national team at this Winter Youth Olympics. He was also a country's flagbearer with Ukrainian biathlete Valeriia Sheihas during the opening ceremony.

In January 2025, at the next IBSF Junior World Championships in Saint Moritz he won a gold medal in men's skeleton and became a U20 world champion. On 31 January, Lavreniuk won a bronze medal in men's skeleton at the European U20 Championships in Sigulda.
