= Basil Sieber =

Swiss Skeleton Athlete

Basl Sieber
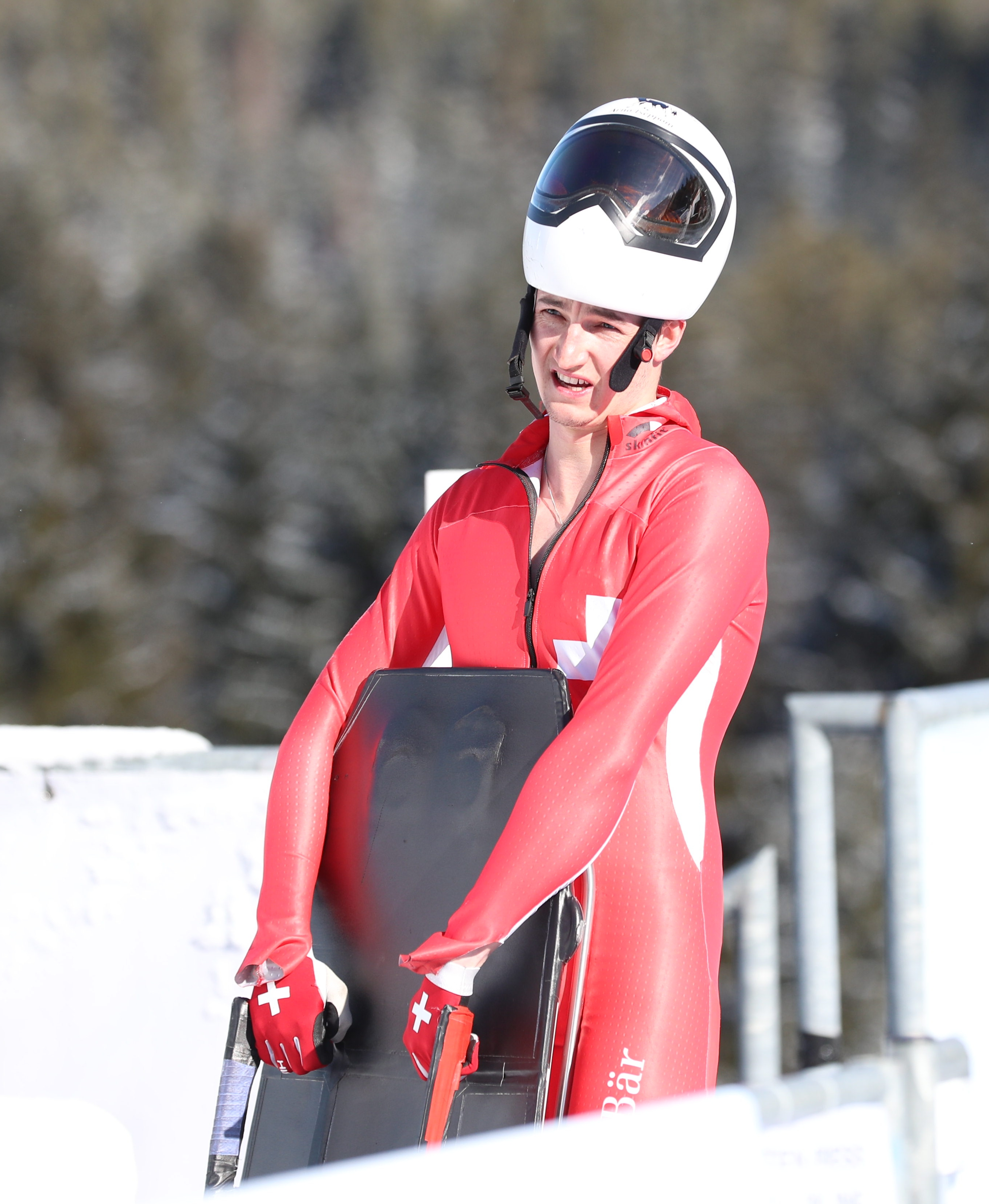
- Sieber in 2020

Personal information
- Nationality: Swiss
- Born: 14 June 1995 (age 31) Samedan, Switzerland

Sport
- Country: Switzerland
- Sport: Skeleton

Basil Sieber (born 27 January 1997) is a Swiss skeleton racer who competed at the 2022 Olympic Winter Games and finished 22nd in the skeleton event.
