= Jung Seung-gi =

South Korean skeleton racer (born 1999)

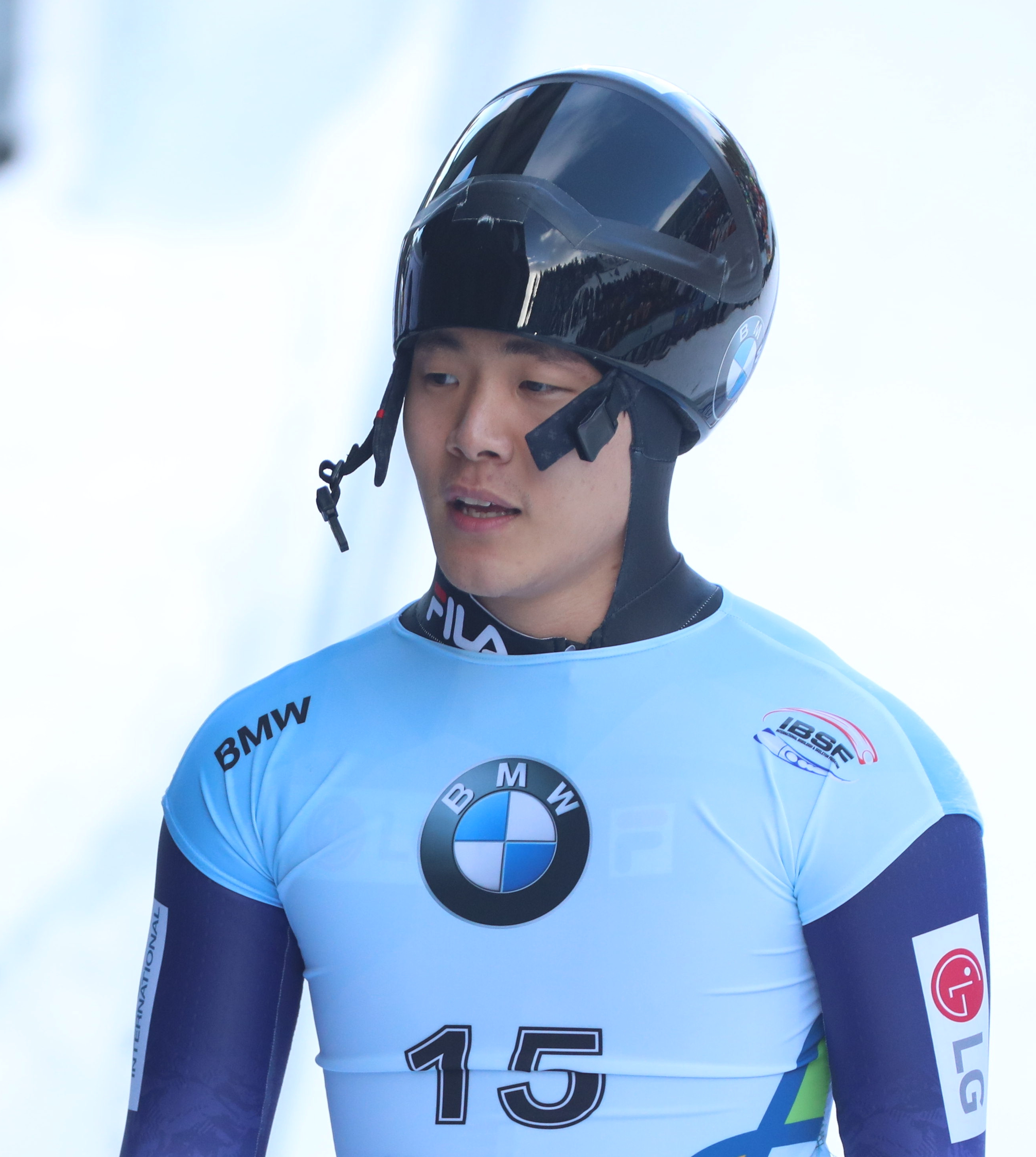
- Jung in 2020

Personal information
- Nationality: South Korean
- Born: 17 March 1999 (age 27) Paju, South Korea
- Height: 1.78 m (5 ft 10 in)
- Weight: 82 kg (181 lb)

Sport
- Country: South Korea
- Sport: Skeleton
- Club: Gangwon Provincial Office
- Turned pro: 2014
- Coached by: Jaemyung Kim; Koshi Kazuhiro; Jeff Pain
Medal record
Men's skeleton
Representing South Korea
World Championships
Bronze medal – third place	2023 St. Moritz	Men

Jung Seung-gi (Korean: 정승기; born 17 March 1999) is a South korean skeleton racer. Jung finished in ninth place in the men's skeleton at the 2019 IBSF World Championships in Whistler, and won a gold medal at the 2018 Intercontinental Cup in Winterberg. He won a bronze medal at the 2023 IBSF World Championships for the first time since Yun Sungbin’s bronze medal back in 2019.

== Early life and education ==
Jung was born on March 17, 1999, in Paju, Gyeonggi Province. In 2014, he was first introduced to the world of Skeleton sport. In 2018, Jung was one of the young Korean athletes who carried the Olympic Flag into the Olympic Stadium at the Opening Ceremony of the 2018 Winter Olympics in Pyeongchang. In 2023, Jung graduated from Catholic Kwandong University with a Bachelor's degree on Sports Rehabilitation.

== Competitive Highlights ==
=== Olympic Games ===
Event	Men's Skeleton	Mixed Team Skeleton
Representing South Korea
(China) 2022 Beijing	10th	—N/a
(Italy) 2026 Milano Cortina	10th	11th

=== World Championships ===
Event	Men's Skeleton
Representing South Korea
(Canada) 2019 Whistler	9th
(Germany) 2020 Altenberg	16th
(Germany) 2021 Altenberg	20th
(Switzerland) 2023 St.Moritz	3rd
(Germany) 2024 Winterberg	14th
(United States) 2025 Lake Placid	22nd

=== Skeleton World Cup ===
Season	Place	Points	1	2	3	4	5	6	7	8
2019–20	12th	904	LPL1; 15	LPL2; 13	WIN; 9	LPG; 11	IGL; 9	KON; 15	STM -	SIG; 11
2020–21	21st	360	SIG1 -	SIG2 -	IGL1 -	IGL2 -	WIN -	STM -	KON; 25	IGL3; 9
2021–22	9th	1104	IGL1; 7	IGL2; 4	ALT1; 22	WIN1; 11	ALT2; 16	SIG; 3	WIN2; 11	STM; 13
2022–23	4th	1478	WHI; 2	PCT; 2	LPL; 3	WIN; 13	ALT1; 4	ALT2; 7	IGL; 2	SIG; 7
