= Hannah Neise =

German skeleton racer (born 2000)

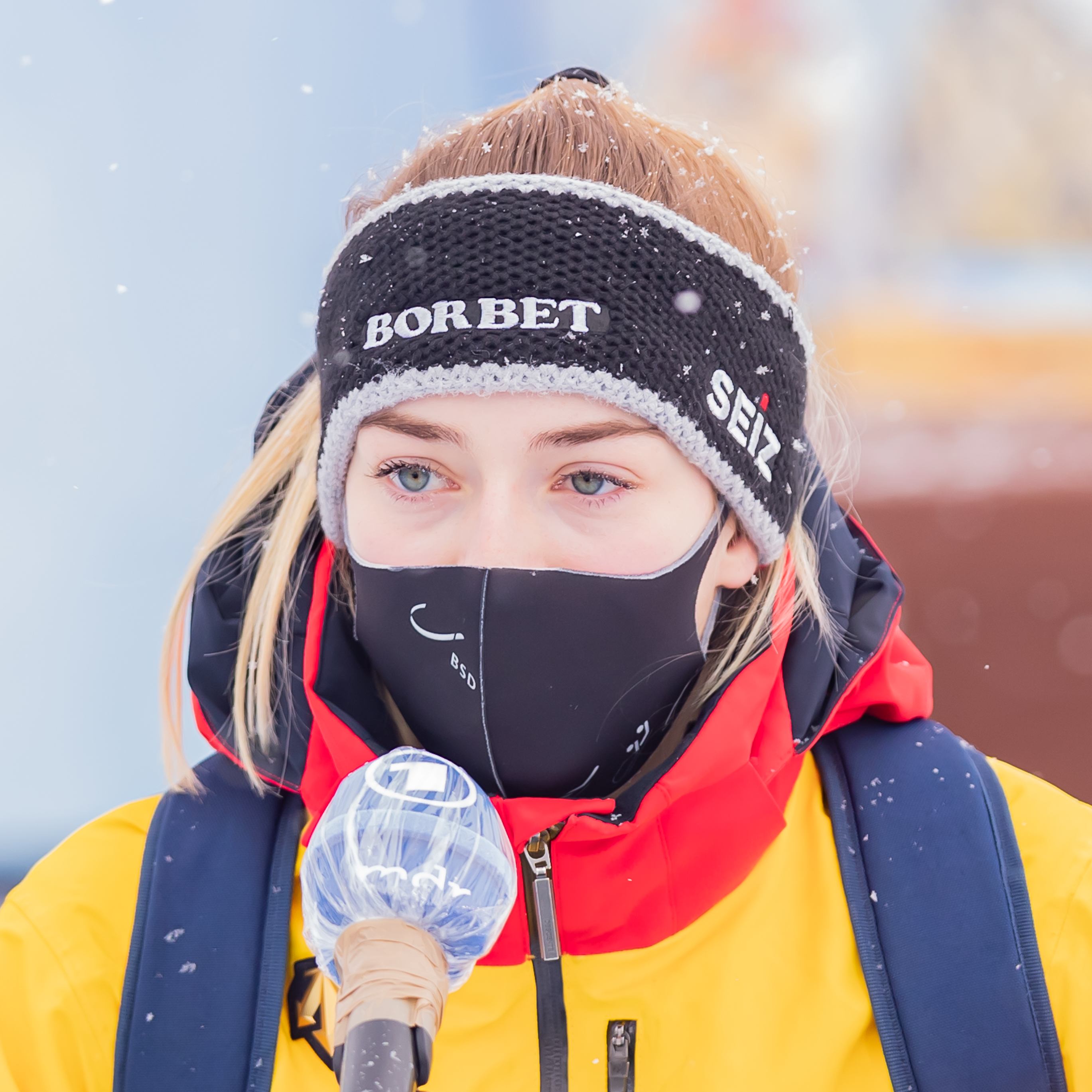
- Neise at the IBSF World Championships 2021

Personal information
- Nationality: German
- Born: 26 May 2000 (age 26) Meschede, Germany
- Height: 168 cm (5 ft 6 in)
- Weight: 60 kg (132 lb)
- Website: Website

Sport
- Country: Germany
- Sport: Skeleton
- Club: BSC Winterberg
- Turned pro: 2014
- Coached by: Heiner Preute
Medal record
Women's skeleton
Representing Germany
Olympic Games
Gold medal – first place	2022 Beijing	Women
World Championships
Gold medal – first place	2024 Winterberg	Mixed team
Bronze medal – third place	2024 Winterberg	Women
European Championships
Silver medal – second place	2024 Sigulda	Women
Youth Olympic Games
Silver medal – second place	2016 Lillehammer	Women
Junior World Championships
Gold medal – first place	2021 St. Moritz	Women
Gold medal – first place	2023 Winterberg	Women
Bronze medal – third place	2020 Winterberg	Women

Hannah Neise (born 26 May 2000) is a German skeleton racer who has competed since 2014.

== Career ==
In 2021, Neise competed and won gold at the Junior World Championships in St. Moritz.

In January 2022, it was announced that Neise would be competing in the 2022 Winter Olympics for Germany. In her first run, she got a time of 1:02.36, putting her at eighth place, but in her second run, she got a time of 1:02.19 putting her in first place of that run and second overall. In her third run, she got a time of 1:01.44, putting her in first place. In the fourth run, Neise placed first with a time of 1:01.63, putting her at a total of 4:07.62 leading her to win the gold medal for Germany. This was Germany's first gold medal in the sport of Skeleton at the Winter Olympics and the first time in sixteen years that a non-British athlete had won the Olympic gold.

== Career results ==
All results are sourced from the International Bobsleigh and Skeleton Federation (IBSF).

=== World Championships ===
Event	Men	Skeleton mixed team
(Germany) 2021 Altenberg	7th	—
(Switzerland) 2023 St. Moritz	15th	—
(Germany) 2024 Winterberg	3rd	1st
(United States) 2025 Lake Placid	17th	

=== World Cup results ===
Season	1	2	3	4	5	6	7	8	Points	Place
2020–21	13	14	8	10	5	4	—	—	912	9th
2021–22	18	10	4	9	7	16	14	8	1104	9th
2022–23	1	6	6	3	—	10	11	7	1225	5th
2023–24	–	5	9	10	1	3	8	14	1177	7th
2024–25	6	2	2	3	4	3	14	9	1452	3rd
2025–26	2	9	6	5	19	St. Moritz	Altenberg	—N/a	796	6th
