= Christopher Grotheer =

German skeleton racer (born 1992)

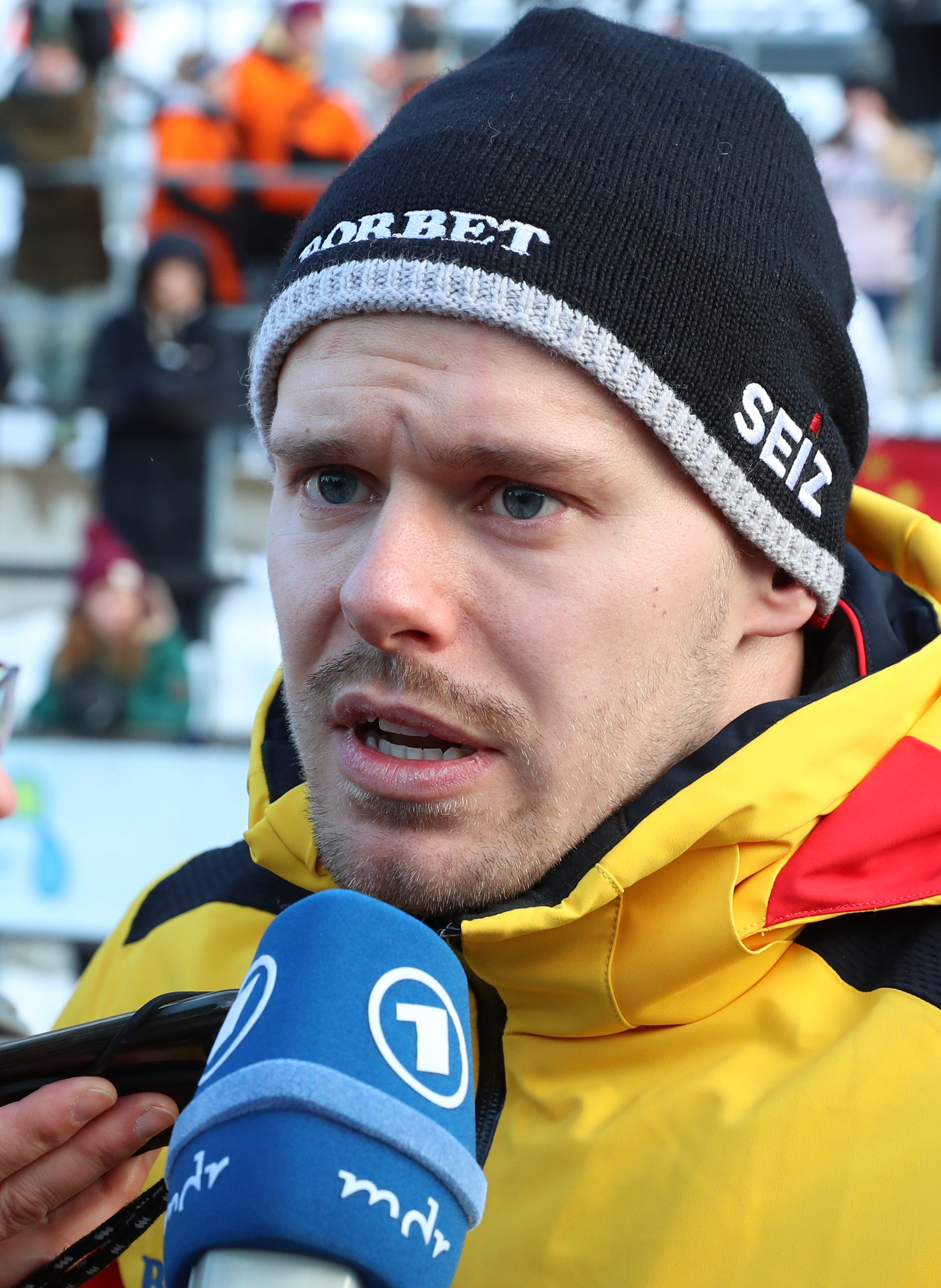
- Grotheer in 2020

Personal information
- Nationality: German
- Born: 30 July 1992 (age 33) Wernigerode, Germany
- Height: 1.80 m (5 ft 11 in)
- Weight: 83 kg (183 lb)

Sport
- Country: Germany
- Sport: Skeleton
- Club: BSR Oberhof
- Turned pro: 2007
Medal record
Men's skeleton
Representing Germany
Olympic Games
Gold medal – first place	2022 Beijing	Men
Bronze medal – third place	2026 Milano Cortina	Men
Bronze medal – third place	2026 Milano Cortina	Mixed team
World Championships
Gold medal – first place	2019 Whistler	Mixed team
Gold medal – first place	2020 Altenberg	Men
Gold medal – first place	2021 Altenberg	Men
Gold medal – first place	2021 Altenberg	Mixed team
Gold medal – first place	2023 St. Moritz	Mixed team
Gold medal – first place	2024 Winterberg	Men
Gold medal – first place	2024 Winterberg	Mixed team
Silver medal – second place	2015 Winterberg	Mixed team
Silver medal – second place	2017 Königssee	Mixed team
European Championships
Silver medal – second place	2023 Altenberg	Men
Bronze medal – third place	2022 St. Moritz	Men
Bronze medal – third place	2026 St. Moritz	Men

Christopher Grotheer (born 30 July 1992) is a German skeleton racer who has competed since 2007. His debut at the European Cup was in November 2010. Grotheer's best Skeleton World Cup finish was 3rd in season 2012–13. He won the Gold medal in Men's Skeleton Singles contest at the 2022 Winter Olympics in Beijing, Germany's first ever in the event.

== Career results ==
All results are sourced from the International Bobsleigh and Skeleton Federation (IBSF).

=== Olympic Games ===
Event	Men	Skeleton mixed team
(South Korea) 2018 Pyeongchang	8th	—N/a
(China) 2022 Beijing	1st	—N/a
(Italy) 2026 Milano Cortina	3rd	3rd

=== World Championships ===
Event	Men	Skeleton mixed team	Mixed team
(Switzerland) 2013 St. Moritz	16th	—N/a	—
(Germany) 2015 Winterberg	5th	—N/a	2nd
(Germany) 2017 Königssee	6th	—N/a	2nd
(Canada) 2019 Whistler	4th	—N/a	1st
(Germany) 2020 Altenberg	1st	5th	—N/a
(Germany) 2021 Altenberg	1st	1st	—N/a
(Switzerland) 2023 St. Moritz	10th	1st	—N/a
(Germany) 2024 Winterberg	1st	1st	—N/a
(United States) 2025 Lake Placid	7th	4th	—N/a

=== World Cup results ===
Season	1	2	3	4	5	6	7	8	9	Points	Place
2012–13	14	12	13	3	–	5	9	7	7	1232	8th
2013–14	–	–	–	15	12	23	–	–	—N/a	282	27th
2014–15	15	4	12	11	9	4	5	–	—N/a	1088	8th
2015–16	7	5	5	DNS	–	–	–	–	—N/a	536	18th
2016–17	9	7	1	4	8	5	5	8	—N/a	1425	5th
2017–18	10	4	4	10	5	3	7	5	—N/a	1408	6th
2018–19	–	–	4	12	6	6	9	DNS	—N/a	824	12th
2020–21	11	6	7	3	8	6	6	–	—N/a	1192	4th
2021–22	3	1	2	3	3	8	9	3	—N/a	1547	3rd
2022–23	5	1	2	1	2	2	4	3	—N/a	1656	1st
2023–24	1	3	5	2	1	9	2	17	—N/a	1494	2nd
2024–25	1	1	1	1	DNS	3	2	9	—N/a	1462	3rd
2025–26	15	21	16	5	3	4	Altenberg	—N/a		838	9th
