= Mirela Rahneva =

Canadian skeleton racer

Mirela Rahneva OLY
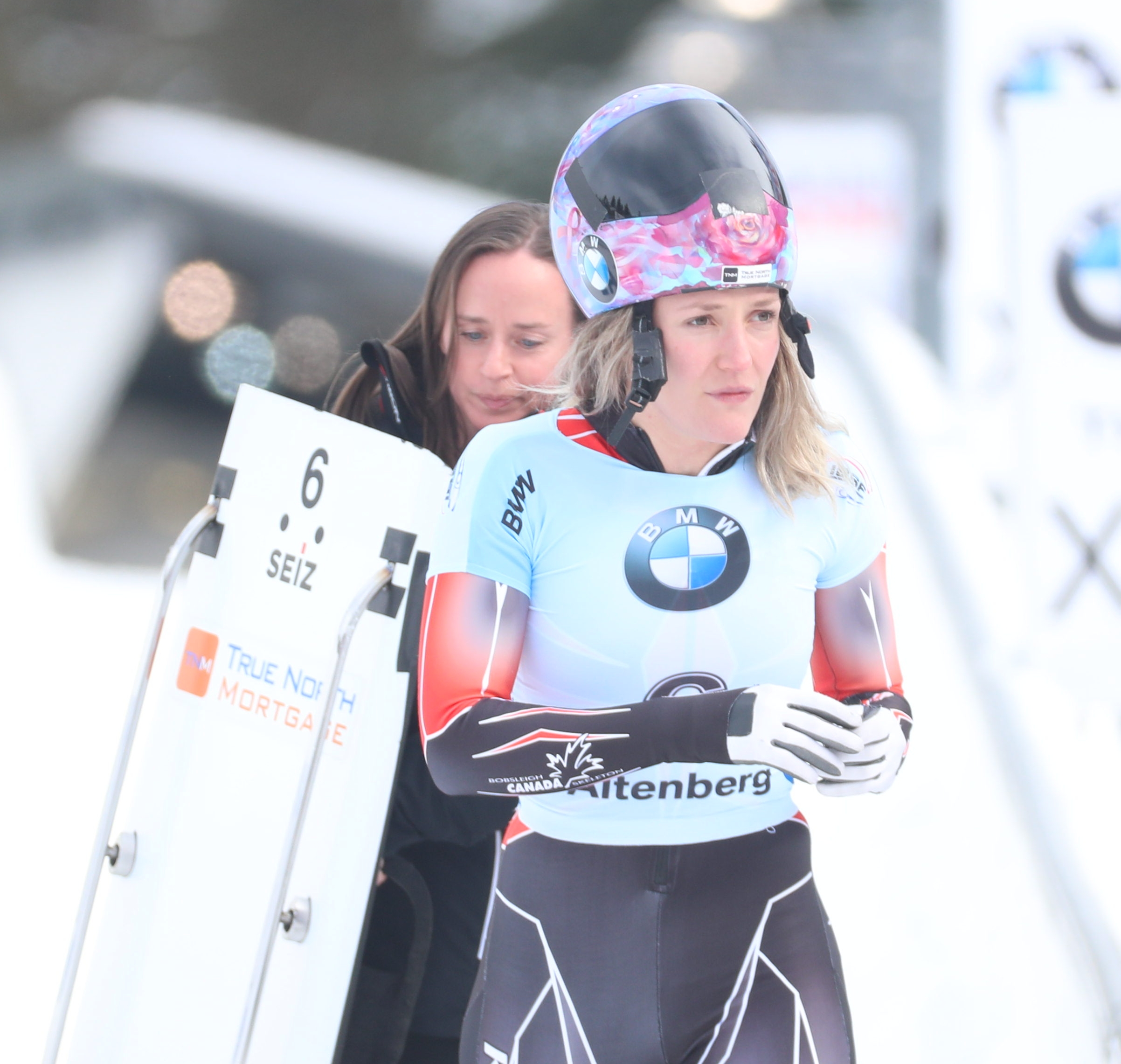
- Rahneva in 2020

Personal information
- Nickname: Mimi
- National team: Canada
- Born: 26 July 1988 (age 38) Ruse, Bulgaria
- Education: University of Guelph
- Height: 1.65 m (5 ft 5 in)
- Weight: 65 kg (143 lb)

Sport
- Country: Canada
- Sport: Skeleton
- Turned pro: 2012

Achievements and titles
- Olympic finals: 12th (Pyeongchang 2018); 5th (Beijing 2022)
Medal record
Women's skeleton
Representing Canada
World Championships
| Silver medal – second place | 2019 Whistler | Mixed team |
| Bronze medal – third place | 2023 St. Moritz | Women |

Mirela "Mimi" Rahneva (born July 26, 1988) is a Canadian skeleton racer. Her family immigrated to Canada in 1997; her father, Stoyan, was a competitive gymnast, and her mother was an elite sprinter. After playing rugby in high school and at the University of Guelph, she began competing in skeleton in 2012 and was selected to the Canadian national team in 2016. She is coached by Quin Sekulich and rides a Bromley sled. She was named one of the three women to represent Canada in skeleton at the 2018 Winter Olympics in Pyeongchang after earning eighth on the World Cup season standings for 2017–18.

In January 2022, Rahneva was named to Canada's 2022 Olympic team.

== Notable results ==
Rahneva's best finish on the World Cup circuit was at St. Moritz in January 2017, her first season on the World Cup, which she won by a remarkable 1.83 seconds. Prior to entering top-level competition, she won the overall North American Cup for 2015. She finished in eighth place at the IBSF World Championships 2017 in Königssee, and was part of a team that finished ninth at the combined bobsleigh-skeleton team competition at the same championships.
