= Altenberg bobsleigh, luge, and skeleton track =

Sports venue in Altenberg, Saxony, Germany

Coordinates: 50°47′7.5″N 13°43′33.3″E

Location in Germany

Altenberg track map

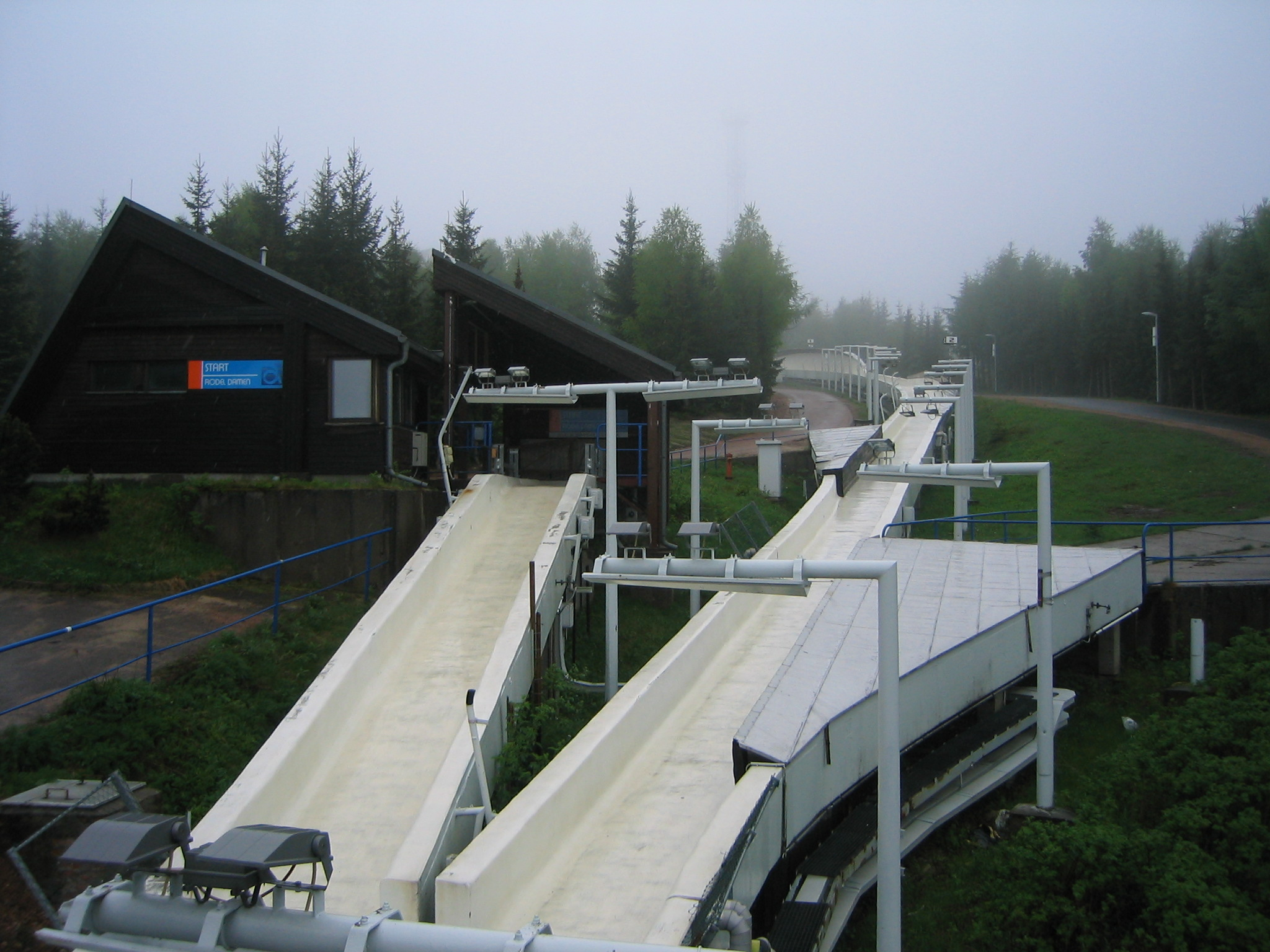
Woman's single luge start house (left). Track (right) leads uphill through turns #2 and #1 to men's single luge and bobsleigh-skeleton start houses.

The Altenberg bobsleigh, luge, and skeleton track is a venue in Germany for bobsleigh, luge, and skeleton. Located in Saxony in eastern Germany, it is northwest of Altenberg, near the border with the Czech Republic.

== History ==
Altenberg raced bobsleigh as early as 1908 on a natural track going downhill. By the late 1970s, the East Germans were already successful in luge, and had increasing success in bobsleigh. This included a total of six Winter Olympic medals in bobsleigh in 1976 and 1980, along with five world bobsleigh championship medals between 1977 and 1979. In order to increase East Germany's effort to win more bobsleigh and luge medals both at the Winter Olympics and their respective sport's world championships, a track was constructed. The track at Altenberg was constructed under the order of then-Stasi (Ministry for State Security in East Germany) Minister Erich Mielke.

Construction began in 1981 under restrictive access with a wire fence and armed patrols from the Landstreitkräfte (East German National People's Army) on orders from Mielke. By 1983, construction was completed though trials were less than successful. This would result in turns 11 and 12 being destroyed and rebuilt. It was not until late 1986 when the track was officially completed with homologation received from both the International Bobsleigh and Tobogganing Federation (FIBT) and the International Luge Federation (FIL) the following year. The track was part of the training used by SG Dynamo Zinnwald/ SV Dynamo until the 1990 German reunification. Men's skeleton first competed in 1992.

In 1997, the women's single luge start house was created before turn three after being shared with the men's double luge start house before turn seven from 1989 to 1996. Women's skeleton first began competition in 1999 while women's bobsleigh first started the following year. An 18th curve was modified during the summer of 2007 with the addition of a finish curve and straightaway.

Over the weekend of 1–3 February 2008, the track hosted the 200th FIL Luge World Cup event, which began in December 1977. The track was awarded the 2012 FIL World Luge Championships at the 2008 FIL Congress in Calgary, Canada, on 28 June of that year, following Whistler's bid withdrawal. Refurbishment of the track for the 2012 World Luge Championships was projected to cost €1.4 million, which included modernizing the electronics and refrigeration system and renovation of the women's and junior start houses.

== Track technical details ==
The track is powered by four refrigeration condensers each with a 200 kW (268 hp) capacity which combined can keep the track frozen at ambient conditions up to 20 °C (68 °F). Its storage tanks hold up to 45 metric tons (50 short tons) of ammonia, generating the equivalent of 12,000 household refrigerators. There a total of fifty sensors located throughout the track with its staff contacted at a moment's notice if anything bad occurs. Monitoring is done by closed-circuit television to further enhance track security The icing of the track starts in October, taking eight workers one week to evenly ice the track to a layer of 2–6 cm (0.8–2.4 in) at a temperature of −13 °C (9 °F).

== Statistics ==
Physical statistics
Sport	Length	Turns
Bobsleigh and skeleton	1,413 m (0.88 mi)	17
Luge - men's singles	1,387 m (0.86 mi)	17
Luge - women's singles	1,220 m (0.76 mi)	15
Luge - men's doubles, team relay and junior	996 m (0.62 mi)	11

The vertical drop is 122.22 metres (401 ft) from the bobsleigh start, with a maximum grade of 15% and an average grade of 8.66%. The elevation at the base is 660 m (2,165 ft) above sea level.

Image	Turn number	Name	Reason named
Omega Kurve	3, 4, 5	Omega	After the Omega shape.
Image not found	6, 7, 8, 9	Labyrinth	Four turns in quick succession without a straight (labyrinth)
Spirale turn	10.	Kreisel	320-degree Kreisel (circular) curve.
.	15, 16, 17	Zielkreisel	"Finish curve" in (in German). Also a Kreisel curve.

Turns 1, 2, 11–14, and 18 have no names listed in the track diagram. Turn 18 is followed by a Bremshang, a finish/braking straight.

Track records (all records from unless noted)
Sport	Record	Nation - athlete(s)	Date	Time (seconds)
Bobsleigh two-man	Start	Germany - André Lange & Kevin Kuske	20 December 2003	5.12
Bobsleigh two-man	Track	Russia - Alexandre Zoubkov & Alexey Voevoda	7 January 2017	54.48
Bobsleigh four-man	Start	Germany - Christoph Langen, Sven Rühr, Markus Zimmermann, & Olav Hampel	12 January 1996	5.04
Bobsleigh four-man	Track	Germany - André Lange, René Hoppe, Kevin Kuske, & Martin Putze	24 February 2008	53.17
Bobsleigh two-woman	Start	Canada - Kaillie Humphries & Heather Moyse	19 December 2009	5.74
Bobsleigh two-woman	Track	Canada - Helen Upperton & Jennifer Ciochetti	19 December 2009	56.79
Skeleton - men's	Start	Aleksandr Tretyakov - Russia	10 February 2007	4.90
Skeleton - men's	Track	Christopher Grotheer - Germany	7 January 2017	56.20
Skeleton - women's	Start	Kerstin Jürgens - Germany	8 January 2005	5.51
Skeleton - women's	Track	Anja Huber - Germany	5 January 2008	58.86
Luge - men's singles	Start	Johannes Ludwig - Germany	5 December 2009	7.555
Luge - men's singles	Track	Albert Demtschenko - Russia	26 November 2005	54.222
Luge - women's singles	Start	Natalie Geisenberger - Germany	6 December 2009	6.054
Luge - women's singles	Track	Sylke Otto - Germany	27 November 2005	53.091
Luge - men's doubles	Start	Germany - Tobias Wendl & Tobias Arlt	22 January 2009	6.202
Luge - men's doubles	Track	Germany - Tobias Wendl & Tobias Arlt	2 February 2008	42.109

== Championships hosted ==
- FIBT World Championships: 1991 (bobsleigh), 1994 (men's skeleton), 2000 (men's bobsleigh), 2008
- FIL European Luge Championships: 2002, 2016
- FIL World Luge Championships: 1996 2012, 2024
