= Amedeo Bagnis =

Italian skeleton racer (born 1999)

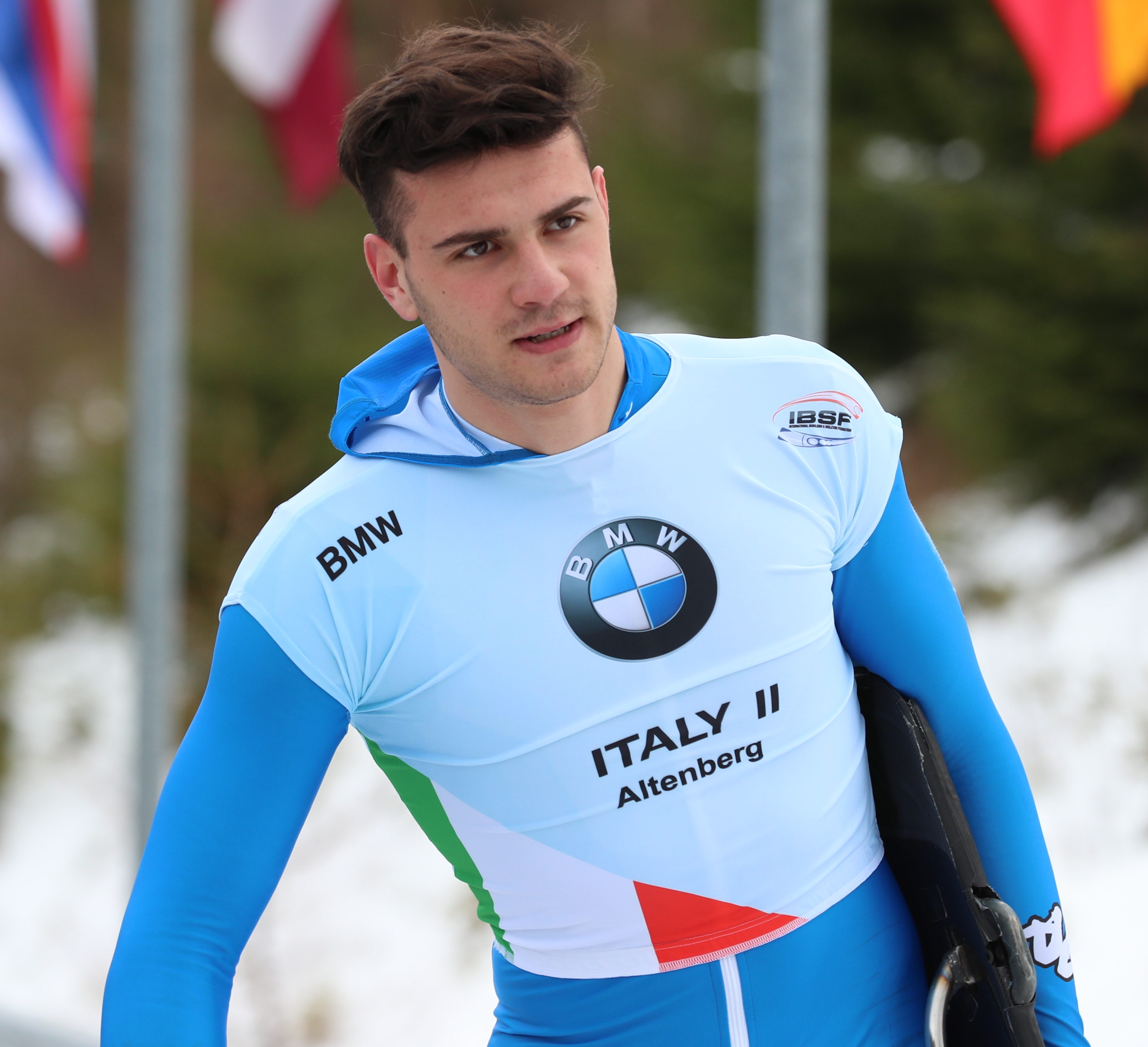
- Bagnis in 2020

Personal information
- Nationality: Italian
- Born: 11 November 1999 (age 26) Vercelli, Italy
- Height: 185 cm (6 ft 1 in)

Sport
- Country: Italy
- Sport: Skeleton
- Club: Bob Club Cortina
Medal record
Men's skeleton
Representing Italy
World Championships
Silver medal – second place	2023 St. Moritz	Men
European Championships
Silver medal – second place	2026 St. Moritz	Men
Silver medal – second place	2026 St. Moritz	Mixed team

Amedeo Bagnis (born 11 November 1999) is an Italian skeleton racer who competed at the 2022 Winter Olympics in Beijing. He lives in Tricerro between Milano and Torino. At the IBSF Junior World Championships 2022 in Innsbruck he won the skeleton bronze medal.
