= St. Moritz-Celerina Olympic Bobrun =

Swiss bobsleigh run

Coordinates: 46.501516°N 9.847418°E

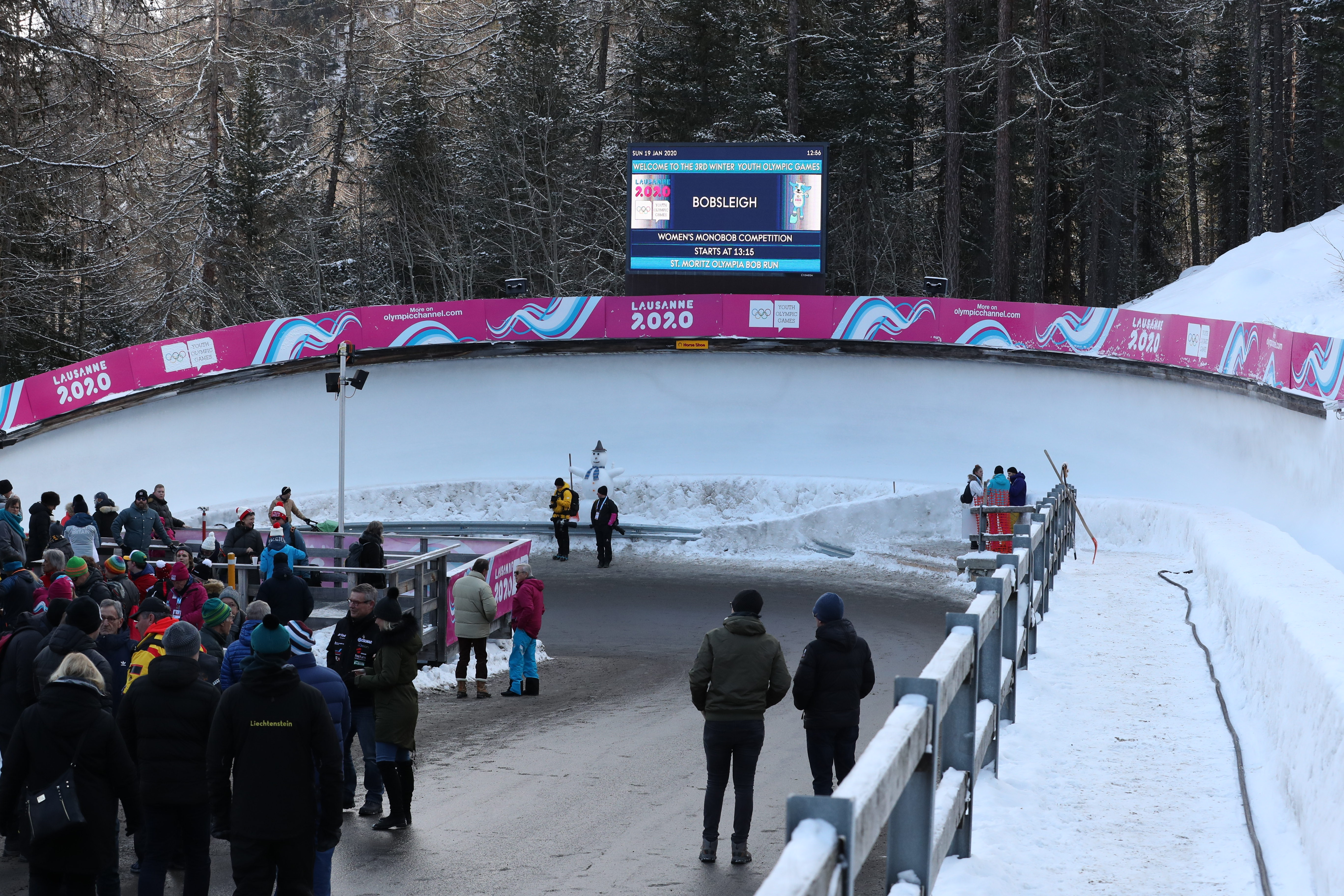
The track as seen during the 2020 Winter Youth Olympics.

The Olympia Bob Run St. Moritz-Celerina is a bobsleigh track located in the Engadin Valley, Switzerland. It officially opened on New Year's Day 1904 and is the oldest bobsleigh track in the world. It is also the only one that is naturally refrigerated. It is used for other sliding sports, including skeleton and luge.

== History ==
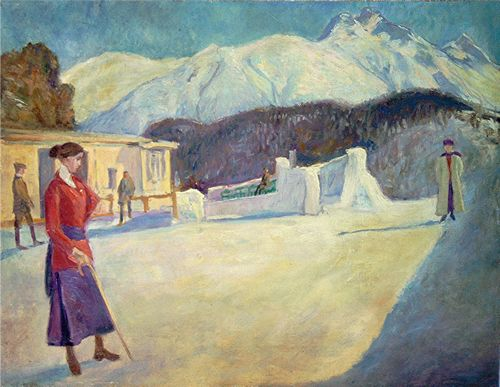
Johannes Martini portrait of the start of the St. Moritz-Celerina Olympic Bobrun in 1905.

The track was initially created for winter guests from Great Britain who invented bobsleigh. In 1897, the St. Moritz Bobsleigh Club was created. Because of the popularity of the sport, fund raising for the track was completed in 1903 with CHF 11,000 raised. The track served as host to the bobsleigh events for both the 1928 and the 1948 Winter Olympics. Track modifications have been made several times since the 1948 games, especially in the lower part of the track to adapt on higher speeds of the sleds and the increased braking issues after the end of the run. The horse-shoe corner, constructed of natural stones, was strengthened and its height and radius increased during the winters of 1995 and 1996. This was also important with the addition of guest rides to the program in 1973. In 1972, the Dracula Start House (Starthaus Dracula (in German)) was demolished and a new structure was created to meet the needs of the bobsleigh organizers with further renovations done in 1992, 1993, and 2002. The last additional modification took place in 2002 with the addition of a runoff after the Portago curve that lead to the Frizzoni's Finish lodge.

== Current track turns and length ==
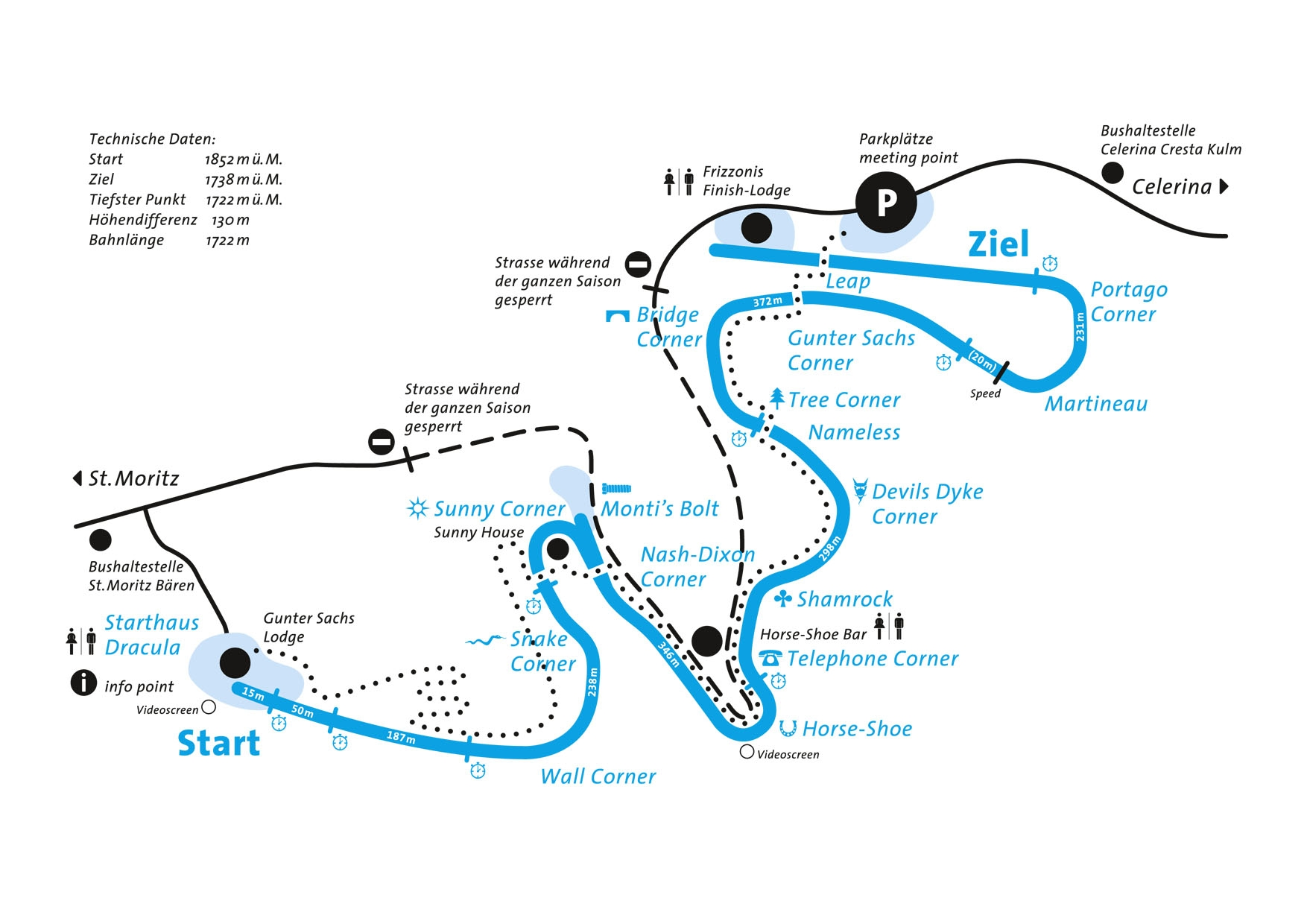
OBR Bob Run Plan

The track, with 19 curves, is 1,722 meters long with an elevation difference of 130 meters and an average grade of 8.14%. The curves were given most of their names by the British and remain to this day.

Turns
Turn Number	Name	Reason named
1.	(Start)	Start at the start house "Dracula", after founder of the Dracula Club created by former St. Moritz Bobsleigh Club president Gunter Sachs (1969–2011).
2.	Wall Corner	Named after a wall used to support the bobsleigh and skeleton turn.
3.	Snake Corner	Curvy like a snake.
4.	Sunny Corner	Sunniest part of the track.
4a.	Monti's Bolt	Named after Italian bobsledder Eugenio Monti who, during the two-man event at the 1964 Winter Olympics in Innsbruck, gave a bolt from his sled to British bobsledders Anthony Nash and Robin Dixon to repair their sled. Nash and Dixon would win gold in the event at those games. This turn serves as the start point to luge for the women's singles and men's doubles event.
5.	Nash-Dixon Corner	Named for British bobsledders Nash and Dixon, gold medalists in the two-man event at the 1964 Winter Olympics in Innsbruck, the only members of the St. Moritz Bobsleigh Club to ever do so.
6.	Horse-Shoe Corner	Omega curve shaped like a horse shoe.
7.	Telephone Corner	Where the first track telephone was installed.
8.	Shamrock	
9.	Devils Dyke Corner	
10.	Tree Corner	There is a tree in the short wall of this corner
11.	Bridge Corner	When you exit this corner you can see the train bridge.
12.	Leap	
13.	Gunter Sachs Corner	After the president of the St. Moritz Bobsleigh Club from 1969 to 2011.
14.	Martineau	After Hubert de Martineau, a Major in the Swiss Army, who was president of the St. Moritz Bobsleigh Club from 1922 to 1969.
15.	Portago Corner	After Alfonso de Portago (1929–57), who won the bronze medal for Spain in the two-man event at the 1957 FIBT World Championships held in St. Moritz only to die later that year during the Mille Miglia race in Italy. A foundation in his name was important in the renovation of the lower part of the track.
16.	(run-out)	

== Track construction ==
The track is constructed out of ice-covered snow, and as such, the track is not exactly identical from year to year. The track construction begins around the middle of November and takes a crew of fifteen ice workers a total of three weeks to construct the track. Construction follows the entire length of the track from start to finish. Because it is a natural track, length and elevation changes occur annually during construction. Once construction is completed, the fifteen workers split up into respective sections to maintain their area during the season which is done every afternoon and can take up to four hours. Once the bobsleigh and skeleton season concludes in early March, track dismantling begins.
