= 2024 in ice sports =

== Bandy ==
=== World Championships ===
- January 19–21: 2024 World Championship in Bandy for Boys 19 in (Norway) Oslo
  - Winner: Sweden
- January 19–21: 2024 World Championship in Bandy for Boys 17 in Mikkeli
  - Winner: Finland

== Bobsleigh & skeleton ==
=== World & Continental Championships ===
- January 7: 2024 IBSF Skeleton Junior World Championships in (Norway) Lillehammer
  - U20 winners: (Latvia) Dāvis Valdovskis (m) / (Germany) Viktoria Hansova (f)
  - Junior winners: (Germany) Lukas David Nydegger (m) / (Germany) Viktoria Hansova (f)
- January 20–21: 2024 IBSF Bobsleigh Junior World Championships in (Switzerland) St. Moritz
  - 2-man Bobsleigh winners: (Germany) Maximilian Illmann & Erik Leypold (junior) / (Germany) Alexander Czudaj & Jörn Wenzel (u23)
  - 4-man Bobsleigh winners: (Germany) (Maximilian Illmann, Henrik Proske, Felix Dahms, Paul Walschburger) (junior) / (Romania) (Andrei Nica, Theodor Asurdoaie, Alexandru Oleinic, Rareș Dincă) (u23)
  - Women's monobob winners: (Switzerland) Debora Annen (junior) / (Switzerland) Debora Annen (u23)
  - 2-woman Bobsleigh winners: (Germany) Charlotte Candrix & Cynthia Kwofie (junior) / (Germany) Charlotte Candrix & Cynthia Kwofie (u23)
- January 22–23: 2024 Winter Youth Olympics in (South Korea) Gangwon
  - Monobob winners: (South Korea) So Jae-hwan (m) / (Denmark) Maja Voigt (w)
  - Skeleton winners: (Latvia) Emīls Indriksons (m) / (Germany) Maria Votz (w)
- February 2–4: IBSF European Championships 2024 in (Latvia) Sigulda
  - 2-man Bobsleigh winners: (Germany) Adam Ammour & Issam Ammour
  - 4-man Bobsleigh winners: Germany (Francesco Friedrich, Candy Bauer, Alexander Schüller, Felix Straub)
  - Women's monobob winner: (Germany) Lisa Buckwitz
  - 2-woman Bobsleigh winners: (Germany) Laura Nolte & Neele Schuten
  - Skeleton winners: (United Kingdom) Marcus Wyatt (m) / (Belgium) Kim Meylemans (f)
- February 22–March 2: IBSF World Championships 2024 in Winterberg
  - 2-man Bobsleigh winners: (Germany) Francesco Friedrich & Alexander Schüller
  - 4-man Bobsleigh winners: Germany (Francesco Friedrich, Thorsten Margis, Alexander Schüller, Felix Straub)
  - Women's monobob winner: (Germany) Laura Nolte
  - 2-woman Bobsleigh winners: (Germany) Lisa Buckwitz & Vanessa Mark
  - Skeleton winners: (Germany) Christopher Grotheer (m) / (Canada) Hallie Clarke (f)
  - Skeleton Mixed relay winners: (Germany) Hannah Neise & Christopher Grotheer
- March 4–10: 2024 IBSF Asian Championships in (South Korea) PyeongChang
- March 9–10: 2024 IBSF Para Sport World Championships in (Norway) Lillehammer
  - Winner: (United States) Robert Balk

=== 2023–24 Bobsleigh World Cup ===
- November 17–19, 2023: WC #1 in (China) Yanqing
  - 2-man Bobsleigh winners: (Germany) Johannes Lochner & Georg Fleischhauer
  - 4-man Bobsleigh winners: Germany (Johannes Lochner, Georg Fleischhauer, Erec Bruckert, Florian Bauer) (1st) / Germany (Johannes Lochner, Georg Fleischhauer, Joshua Tasche, Florian Bauer) (2nd)
- December 9–10, 2023: WC #2 in (France) La Plagne
  - 2-man Bobsleigh winners: (Switzerland) Michael Vogt & Sandro Michel
  - 4-man Bobsleigh winners: Germany (Francesco Friedrich, Thorsten Margis, Alexander Schüller, Felix Straub)
  - Women's Monobob winner: (United States) Kaysha Love
  - 2-woman Bobsleigh winners: (Germany) Laura Nolte & Neele Schuten
- December 16–17, 2023: WC #3 in (Austria) Innsbruck
  - 2-man Bobsleigh winners: (Germany) Johannes Lochner & Georg Fleischhauer
  - 4-man Bobsleigh winners: Germany (Francesco Friedrich, Candy Bauer, Alexander Schüller, Felix Straub)
  - Women's Monobob winners: (Germany) Lisa Buckwitz (2 times)
  - 2-woman Bobsleigh winners: (Germany) Lisa Buckwitz & Vanessa Mark
- January 13–14: WC #4 in (Switzerland) St. Moritz
  - 2-man Bobsleigh winners: (Germany) Johannes Lochner & Georg Fleischhauer
  - 4-man Bobsleigh winners: Germany (Johannes Lochner, Florian Bauer, Erec Bruckert, Georg Fleischhauer)
  - Women's Monobob winners: (Germany) Lisa Buckwitz
  - 2-woman Bobsleigh winners: (Germany) Laura Nolte & Neele Schuten
- January 27–28: WC #5 in (Norway) Lillehammer
  - 2-man Bobsleigh winners: (Germany) Johannes Lochner & Georg Fleischhauer
  - 4-man Bobsleigh winners: Germany (Francesco Friedrich, Thorsten Margis, Alexander Schüller, Felix Straub)
  - Women's Monobob winners: (United States) Kaysha Love
  - 2-woman Bobsleigh winners: (Germany) Kim Kalicki & Leonie Fiebig
- February 2–4: WC #6 in (Latvia) Sigulda
  - 2-man Bobsleigh winners: (Germany) Adam Ammour & Benedikt Hertel
  - Women's Monobob winners: (Germany) Lisa Buckwitz
  - 2-woman Bobsleigh winners: (Germany) Kim Kalicki & Leonie Fiebig (1st) / (Germany) Laura Nolte & Neele Schuten (2nd)
- February 17–18: WC #7 in Altenberg
  - 2-man Bobsleigh winners: (Germany) Adam Ammour & Costa Laurenz
  - 4-man Bobsleigh winners: Germany (Francesco Friedrich, Candy Bauer, Alexander Schüller, Felix Straub) & Latvia (Emīls Cipulis, Dāvis Spriņģis, Matīss Miknis, Krists Lindenblats)
  - Women's Monobob winners: (Germany) Laura Nolte
  - 2-woman Bobsleigh winners: (Germany) Laura Nolte & Deborah Levi
- March 22–23: WC #8 in (United States) Lake Placid

=== 2023–24 Skeleton World Cup ===
- November 17–19, 2023: WC #1 in (China) Yanqing
  - Men's winner: (Germany) Christopher Grotheer
  - Women's winner: (Germany) Tina Hermann
- December 9–10, 2023: WC #2 in (France) La Plagne
  - Men's winner: (South Korea) Jung Seung-gi
  - Women's winner: (United Kingdom) Tabitha Stoecker
- December 16–17, 2023: WC #3 in (Austria) Innsbruck
  - Men's winner: (United Kingdom) Matt Weston
  - Women's winner: (Netherlands) Kimberley Bos
- January 12–13: WC #4 in (Switzerland) St. Moritz
  - Men's winner: (Italy) Amedeo Bagnis
  - Women's winner: (Netherlands) Kimberley Bos
  - Mixed relay winner: (Italy) Valentina Margaglio & Amedeo Bagnis
- January 27–28: WC #5 in (Norway) Lillehammer
  - Men's winner: (Germany) Christopher Grotheer
  - Women's winner: (Germany) Hannah Neise
- February 2–4: WC #6 in (Latvia) Sigulda
  - Men's winner: (China) Yin Zheng
  - Women's winner: (Canada) Mirela Rahneva
- February 17–18: WC #7 in (Germany) Altenberg
  - Men's winner: (China) Yin Zheng
  - Women's winner: (Germany) Tina Hermann
- March 22–23: WC #8 in (United States) Lake Placid

=== 2023–24 Para Sport World Cup ===
- November 30 – December 1, 2023: Para Sport WC #1 in (Norway) Lillehammer
  - Men's Para Bobsleigh winners: (Latvia) Arturs Klots (1st) / (United States) Guillermo Castillo (2nd)
- December 16–17, 2023: Para Sport WC #2 in (Latvia) Sigulda
  - Men's Para Bobsleigh winners: (Latvia) Arturs Klots (2 times)
- February 29 – March 1: Para Sport WC #3 in (Switzerland) St. Moritz
  - Men's Para Bobsleigh winner: (Switzerland) Christopher Stewart
- March 8: Para Sport WC #4 in (Norway) Lillehammer
  - Men's Para Bobsleigh winner: (United Kingdom) Corie Mapp
- March 23–24: Para Sport WC #4 in (France) La Plagne
  - Men's Para Bobsleigh winners: (United States) Robert Balk (1st) / (Switzerland) Christopher Stewart & (Latvia) Arturs Klots (2nd)
- Overall World Cup winner: (United Kingdom) Corie Mapp

=== 2023–24 IBSF Bobsleigh European Cup ===
- November 27 – December 6, 2023: EC #1 in (Norway) Lillehammer
  - 2-man Bobsleigh winners: (Switzerland) Timo Rohner & Mathieu Hersperger (1st) / (Germany) Alexander Czudaj & Jörn Wenzel (2nd) & (3rd)
  - 4-man Bobsleigh winners: Germany (Nico Semmler, Christian Ebert, Felix Dahms, Max Neumann) (1st) / Germany (Hans-Peter Hannighofer, Marcel Kornhardt, Henrik Bosse, Tim Gessenhardt) (2nd) & (3rd)
  - Women's Monobob winners: (Romania) Andreea Grecu (1st) / (Germany) Maureen Zimmer (2nd) / (Switzerland) Inola Blatty (3rd)
  - 2-woman Bobsleigh winners: (Austria) Katrin Beierl & Anna Schenk / (Austria) Katrin Beierl & Isabela Indruchova (2nd) / (Germany) Maureen Zimmer & Cynthia Kwofie (3rd)
- December 12–17, 2023: EC #2 in (Latvia) Sigulda
  - 2-man Bobsleigh winners: (Germany) Laurin Zern & Alexander Schaller (1st) / (Germany) Alexander Czudaj & Jörn Wenzel (2nd)
  - Women's Monobob winner: (Germany) Diana Filipszki
  - 2-woman Bobsleigh winners: (Belgium) Kelly Van Petegem & Jienity de Kler
- January 3–9: EC #3 in Altenberg
  - 2-man Bobsleigh winners: (Germany) Hans-Peter Hannighofer & Tim Becker
  - 4-man Bobsleigh winners: Germany (Hans-Peter Hannighofer, Marcel Kornhardt, Henrik Bosse, Tim Gessenhardt) (1st) / Germany (Hans-Peter Hannighofer, Theo Hempel, Erik Leypold, Tim Becker) (2nd)
  - Women's Monobob winners: (Germany) Maureen Zimmer (1st) / (Belgium) Kelly Van Petegem (2nd)
  - 2-woman Bobsleigh winners: (Germany) Diana Filipszki & Lena Brunnhubner
- January 14–19: EC #4 in St. Moritz
  - 2-man Bobsleigh winners: (Germany) Maximilian Illmann & Henrik Proske
  - 4-man Bobsleigh winners: Switzerland (Timo Rohner, Julien Matthys, Dusan Novakovic, Mathieu Hersperger)
  - Women's Monobob winners: (Switzerland) Debora Annen
  - 2-woman Bobsleigh winners: (United Kingdom) Adele Nicoll & Kya Placide
- January 28 – February 3: EC #5 in (Austria) Innsbruck
  - 2-man Bobsleigh winners: (Germany) Maximilian Illmann & Costa Laurenz
  - 4-man Bobsleigh winners: Germany (Hans-Peter Hannighofer, Marcel Kornhardt, Henrik Bosse, Tim Gessenhardt)
  - Women's Monobob winners: (United States) Sylvia Hoffman
  - 2-woman Bobsleigh winners: (Germany) Diana Filipszki & Cynthia Kwofie

=== 2023–24 IBSF Skeleton European Cup ===
- December 1–2, 2023: EC #1 in (Austria) Bludenz
  - Men's winner: (Germany) Stefan Roettig
  - Women's winner: (Germany) Sarah Schwab
  - Second men's and women's races were cancelled
- December 15, 2023: EC #2 in (Germany) Winterberg
  - Men's winner: (Germany) Lukas David Nydegger
  - Women's winner: (Germany) Corinna Leipold
- December 20–21, 2023: EC #3 in (Germany) Altenberg
  - Men's winners: (Germany) Cedric Renner (2 times)
  - Women's winners: (Germany) Corinna Leipold (1st) / (Germany) Viktoria Hansova (2nd)
- January 11–12: EC #4 in (Norway) Lillehammer
  - Men's winners: (China) Lin Qinwei (1st) / (Germany) Lukas David Nydegger (2nd)
  - Women's winners: (Germany) Corinna Leipold (2 times)
- February 9–10: EC #5 in (Austria) Innsbruck
  - Men's winners: (Germany) Lukas David Nydegger (2 times)
  - Women's winners: (Germany) Corinna Leipold (#1) / (Germany) Viktoria Dönicke (#2)

=== 2023–24 IBSF Bobsleigh North American Cup ===
- November 12–19, 2023: NAC #1 in Lake Placid
  - 2-man Bobsleigh winners: (United States) Frank Del Luca & Joshua Williamson (1st) / (United States) Frank Del Luca & Manteo Mitchell (2nd)
  - 4-man Bobsleigh winners: Canada (Pat Norton, Davidson de Souza, Keaton Bruggeling, Chris Ashley) (1st) / United States (Kristopher Horn, Adrian Adams, Jace Johnson, David Simon) (2nd)
  - Women's Monobob winners: (Australia) Breeana Walker (1st) / (United States) Kaysha Love (2nd)
  - 2-woman Bobsleigh winners: (United States) Kaysha Love & Jestena Mattson (1st) / (United States) Kaysha Love & Azaria Hill (2nd)
- November 26 – December 3, 2023: NAC #2 in (Canada) Whistler
  - 2-man Bobsleigh winners: (Canada) Carter Malyk & Sam Cuciz (2 times)
  - 4-man Bobsleigh winners: Event not held
  - Women's Monobob winners: (Canada) Melissa Lotholz (2 times)
  - 2-woman Bobsleigh winners: (Slovakia) Viktória Čerňanská & Lucia Mokrášová (1st) / (Canada) Melissa Lotholz & Alex Klein (2nd)
- December 7–16, 2023: NAC #3 in (United States) Park City
  - 2-man Bobsleigh winners: (South Korea) Kim Jin-su & Kim Sun-wook (1st) / (Canada) Pat Norton & Keaton Bruggeling (2nd)
  - 4-man Bobsleigh winners: Canada (Pat Norton, Mike Evelyn, Keaton Bruggeling, Shaq Murray-Lawrence) (2 times)
  - Women's Monobob winners: (Canada) Melissa Lotholz (1st) / (Canada) Kristen Bujnowski (2nd)
  - 2-woman Bobsleigh winners: (United States) Lauren Brzozowski & Sydney Milani (1st) / (Canada) Melissa Lotholz & Alex Klein (2nd)
- March 3–10: NAC #4 in (United States) Lake Placid
  - 2-man Bobsleigh winners: (South Korea) Kim Jin-su & Kim Hyeong-geun (1st) / (South Korea) Kim Jin-su & Lee Kyung-yeon (2nd)
  - 4-man Bobsleigh winners: South Korea (Suk Young-jin, Lee Kyung-yeon, Park Jong-hee, So Jae-hwan) (1st) / South Korea (Kim Jin-su, Lee Kyung-yeon, Park Jong-hee, So Jae-hwan) (2nd)
  - Women's Monobob winners: (Canada) Melissa Lotholz (2 times)
  - 2-woman Bobsleigh winners: (United States) Kaysha Love & Sydney Milani (1st) / (United States) Kaysha Love & Azaria Hill (2nd)
- Overall 2-man Bobsleigh winner: (United States) Kristopher Horn
- Overall 4-man Bobsleigh winner: (United States) Kristopher Horn
- Overall Women's Monobob winner: (Canada) Melissa Lotholz
- Overall 2-woman Bobsleigh winner: (Canada) Melissa Lotholz

=== 2023–24 IBSF Skeleton North American Cup ===
- November 17–18, 2023: NAC #1 in (United States) Lake Placid
  - Men's winners: (Canada) Blake Enzie (2 times)
  - Women's winners: (Puerto Rico) Kellie Delka (1st) / (United States) Katie Uhlaender (2nd)
- December 1–2, 2023: NAC #2 in (Canada) Whistler
  - Men's winners: (Canada) Ryan Kuehn (1st) / (Canada) Mark Lynch (2nd)
  - Women's winners: (Canada) Tirza Lara (2 times)
- December 9–10, 2023: NAC #3 in (United States) Park City
  - Men's winners: (South Korea) Sim Hyung-jun (2 times)
  - Women's winners: (United States) Katie Uhlaender (2 times)
- March 7–8: NAC #4 in (United States) Lake Placid
  - Men's winners: (China) Zheng Yin (1st) / (China) Chen Wenhao (2nd)
  - Women's winners: (United States) Mystique Ro (1st) / (Netherlands) Kimberley Bos (2nd)
- Overall Men's winner: (Republic of Ireland) Brendan Doyle
- Overall Women's winner: (United States) Katie Uhlaender

== Figure skating ==
=== ISU Championships ===
- January 8–14: 2024 European Figure Skating Championships in (Lithuania) Kaunas
  - Men's champion: (France) Adam Siao Him Fa
  - Women's champion: (Belgium) Loena Hendrickx
  - Pairs champions: (Italy) Lucrezia Beccari / Matteo Guarise
  - Ice dance champions: (Italy) Charlène Guignard / Marco Fabbri
- January 27 – February 1: 2024 Winter Youth Olympics in Gangwon
  - Men's champion: (South Korea) Kim Hyun-gyeom
  - Women's champion: (Japan) Mao Shimada
  - Pairs champions: (Canada) Annika Behnke / Kole Sauve
  - Ice dance champions: (France) Ambre Perrier-Gianesini / Samuel Blanc-Klaperman
  - Team event champions: South Korea
- January 29 – February 4: 2024 Four Continents Figure Skating Championships in (China) Shanghai
  - Men's champion: (Japan) Yuma Kagiyama
  - Women's champion: (Japan) Mone Chiba
  - Pairs champions: (Canada) Deanna Stellato-Dudek / Maxime Deschamps
  - Ice dance champions: (Canada) Piper Gilles / Paul Poirier
- February 26 – March 3: 2024 World Junior Figure Skating Championships in (Chinese Taipei) Taipei
  - Men's champion: (South Korea) Seo Min-kyu
  - Women's champion: (Japan) Mao Shimada
  - Pairs champions: (Georgia (country)) Anastasiia Metelkina / Luka Berulava
  - Ice dance champions: (United States) Leah Neset / Artem Markelov
- March 18–24: 2024 World Figure Skating Championships in (Canada) Montreal, Quebec

== Ice climbing ==
- Full 2023–24 Ice Climbing Events Database here.

=== World Championships ===
- January 18–20: 2024 UIAA Ice Climbing World Youth Championships in (France) Champagny-en-Vanoise
  - Speed men winners: (Mongolia) Batzorig Munkhbaatar (u20) / (Switzerland) Lars Erik Dolf (u18) / (United States) Landers Gaydosh (u16)
  - Speed women winners: (Liechtenstein) Lorena Beck (u20) / (Netherlands) Mirre Wijnen (u18) / (Finland) Lili Boijer-Spoof (u16)
  - Lead men winners: (Switzerland) Tim Ziegler (u20) / (Spain) Lucas Pérez Nieto (u18) / (United States) Landers Gaydosh (u16)
  - Lead women winners: (Liechtenstein) Lorena Beck (u20) / (United Kingdom) Kasha Ogilvie (u18) / (Switzerland) Jill Zollinger (u16)
- February 16–18: 2024 UIAA Ice Climbing World Championships in (Canada) Edmonton
  - Speed winners: (Iran) Mohammad Reza Safdarian (m) / (Czech Republic) Aneta Loužecká (f)
  - Lead winners: (South Korea) Lee Young-geon (m) / (South Korea) Shin Woon-seon (f)

=== 2023–24 UIAA Ice Climbing World Cup ===
- January 12–14: World Cup #1 in (South Korea) Cheongsong
  - Speed winners: (Mongolia) Kherlen Nyamdoo (m) / (Czech Republic) Aneta Loužecká (f)
  - Lead winners: (South Korea) Kwon Young-hye (m) / (South Korea) Shin Woon-seon (f)
- January 25–27: World Cup #2 in (Switzerland) Saas-Fee
  - Speed winners: (Mongolia) Mandakhbayar Chuluunbaatar (m) / (Liechtenstein) Lorena Beck (f)
  - Lead winners: (France) Virgile Devin (m) / (South Korea) Shin Woon-seon (f)
- February 16–18: World Cup #3 in (Canada) Edmonton
  - Speed winners: (Iran) Mohammad Reza Safdarian (m) / (Czech Republic) Aneta Loužecká (f)
  - Lead winners: (South Korea) Lee Young-geon (m) / (South Korea) Shin Woon-seon (f)

=== 2023–24 UIAA Ice Climbing Continental Open ===
- November 25, 2023: Continental Open #1 in (Slovakia) Žilina
  - Lead winners: (Spain) Jorge Veiga Rodríguez (m) / (Netherlands) Marianne van der Steen (f)
- December 2, 2023: Continental Open #2 in (Czech Republic) Brno
  - Lead winners: (Switzerland) Benjamin Bosshard (m) / (Czech Republic) Aneta Loužecká (f)
- December 16, 2023: Continental Open #3 in (Netherlands) Utrecht
  - Lead winners: (Spain) Javier Cano Blázquez (m) / (Netherlands) Marianne van der Steen (f)
- January 18–20: Continental Open #4 in (United States) Ouray
  - Lead winners: (United States) Tyler Kempney (m) / (United States) Catalina Shirley (f)
- January 20–21: Continental Open #5 in (France) Champagny-en-Vanoise
  - Lead winners: (France) Louna Ladevant (m) / (South Korea) Shin Woon-seon (f)
- February 3: Continental Open #6 in (Finland) Oulu
  - Lead winners: (Spain) Jorge Veiga Rodríguez (m) / (Liechtenstein) Lorena Beck (f)
- February 10: Continental Open #7 in (United Kingdom) Sunderland
  - Lead winners: (Slovenia) Gregor Šegel (m) / (Poland) Olga Kosek (f)

== Ice cross downhill ==
=== 2023–24 ATSX Ice Cross World Championship ===
- January 19–20: WC #1 in (Austria) Winterleiten
  - Winners: (Poland) Łukasz Korzestański (m) / (Austria) Veronika Windisch (w) / (Austria) Niklas Begander (juniors)
- January 26–27: WC #2 in (France) Pra Loup
  - Race cancelled
- February 9–10: WC #3 in (Finland) Rautalampi
  - Winners: (Switzerland) Patrik Merz (m) / (Austria) Veronika Windisch (w) / (Austria) Niklas Begander (juniors)
- February 16–17: WC #4 in (Canada) Sainte-Angèle-de-Mérici
  - Winners: (Canada) Rob Worling (m) / (Austria) Veronika Windisch (w) / (United States) Jack Beatson (juniors)
- February 23–24: WC #5 in (United States) Lost Valley
  - Winners: (Czech Republic) Michael Urban (m) / (Latvia) Justīne Zonne (w) / (United States) Wesley Clements (juniors)
- Overall winners: (Canada) Rob Worling (m) / (Austria) Veronika Windisch (w) / (Austria) Niklas Begander (juniors)

== Ice stock sport ==
- Full Ice stock sport results here.

=== International Championships ===
- November 24–26, 2023: European Cup (Women) in (Germany) Regen
  - Winner : (Germany) TSV Kühbach
- November 17–19, 2023: European Cup (Men) in (Germany) Regen
  - Winner : (Germany) EC Moitzerlitz Regen
- January 26–28: Open European Championships 2024 in the distance competition in Goggausee
  - Men's winners: (Germany) Michael Späth / Austria (team)
  - Women's winners: (Germany) Kathleen Neumayer / Austria (team)
  - Mixed winners: (Germany) Annalena Leitner & Alexander Anzinger
  - U23 winners: Peter Neubauer / Austria (team)
  - U19 winners: (Lithuania) Rytis Petruškevičius / Germany (team)
  - U16 winners: (Austria) Maximilian Moser / Germany (team)
- February 20–25: 2024 Junior European Championships in team and target competition for all classes in (Italy) Brunico
  - Target competition men u16 & u19 winners: (Austria) Florian Kreuzeder (u16) / (Austria) Andreas Scharrer (u19)
  - Target competition u23 winners: (Germany) Florian Marchl (m) / (Germany) Alina Mayer (w)
  - Target competition team men u16 & u19 winners: Austria (u16) / Germany (u19)
  - Target competition team u23 winners: Austria (m) / Austria (w) / Austria (mixed)
  - Team competition winners: Austria (u16) / Austria (u19) / Austria (u23)
- March 5–10: 2024 Open European Championships Women & Men in Waldkraiburg
  - Target competition winners: (Germany) Stefan Zellermayer (m) / (Austria) Sophie Schmutzer (w)
  - Target competition team winners: Germany (m) / Germany (w) / Austria (mixed)
  - Team competition winners: Austria (m) / Italy (w)
- June 28–30: 10th Africa Cup for Women and Men in Team-game and Target competition in (Gabon) Libreville

== Luge ==
- Full FIL 2023/24 Calendar here.

=== Artificial Track ===
World & Continental Championships

- December 8–9, 2023: 2023 FIL Asian Championships in (South Korea) PyeongChang
  - Singles winners: (Japan) Seiya Kobayashi (m) / (South Korea) Jung Hye-sun (f)
  - Doubles winners: (South Korea) Park Jin-yong & Cho Jung-myung (m)
- December 8–9, 2023: 2023 FIL Junior America-Pacific-Championships in (Canada) Whistler
  - Singles winners: (Canada) Dylan Morse (m) / (Canada) Embyr-Lee Susko (f)
  - Doubles winners: (United States) Marcus Mueller & Ansel Haugsjaa (m) / (Canada) Embyr-Lee Susko & Beattie Podulsky (f)
- December 8–9, 2023: 2023 FIL America-Pacific Championships in (Canada) Whistler
  - Singles winners: (United States) Tucker West (m) / (United States) Emily Sweeney (f)
  - Doubles winners: (Canada) Devin Wardrope & Cole Zajanski (m) / (United States) Chevonne Chelsea Forgan & Sophia Kirkby (f)
- January 12–14: 2024 FIL European Luge Championships in Innsbruck
  - Singles winners: (Austria) Jonas Müller (m) / (Austria) Madeleine Egle (f)
  - Doubles winners: (Austria) Thomas Steu & Wolfgang Kindl (m) / (Germany) Jessica Degenhardt & Cheyenne Rosenthal (f)
  - Team Relay winners: Austria
- January 20–23: 2024 Winter Youth Olympics in (South Korea) Gangwon
  - Singles winners: (Italy) Leon Haselrieder (m) / (Germany) Antonia Pietschmann (f)
  - Doubles winners: (Italy) Philipp Brunner & Manuel Weissensteiner (m) / (Italy) Alexandra Oberstolz & Katharina Sofie Kofler (f)
- January 26–28: 2024 FIL World Luge Championships in Altenberg
  - Singles winners: (Germany) Max Langenhan (m) / (Austria) Lisa Schulte (f)
  - Doubles winners: (Austria) Juri Gatt & Riccardo Schöpf (m)/ (Austria) Selina Egle & Lara Kipp (f)
  - Singles Sprint winners: (Austria) David Gleirscher (m) / (Germany) Julia Taubitz (f)
  - Doubles Sprint winners: (Latvia) Mārtiņš Bots & Roberts Plūme (m) / (Italy) Andrea Vötter & Marion Oberhofer (f)
  - Team Relay winners: Germany
- February 2–3: 2024 FIL Junior European Championships in (Switzerland) St. Moritz
  - Singles winners: (Latvia) Kaspars Rinks (m) / (Germany) Anka Jänicke (f)
  - Doubles winners: (Latvia) Raimonds Baltgalvis & Vitalijs Jegorovs (m) / (Germany) Elisa-Marie Storch & Pauline Patz (f)
  - Team Relay winners: Latvia
- February 16–17: 2024 FIL Junior World Championships in (Norway) Lillehammer
  - Singles winners: (Germany) Marco Leger (m) / (Germany) Antonia Pietschmann (f)
  - Doubles winners: (United States) Marcus Mueller & Ansel Haugsjaa (m) / (Germany) Elisa-Marie Storch & Pauline Patz (f)
  - Team Relay winners: Germany

==== 2023–24 Luge World Cup ====
- December 8–9, 2023: World Cup #1 in (United States) Lake Placid
  - Singles winners: (Germany) Max Langenhan (m) / (Austria) Madeleine Egle (f)
  - Singles Sprint winners: (Germany) Max Langenhan (m) / (Germany) Julia Taubitz (f)
  - Doubles winners: (United States) Zachary DiGregorio & Sean Hollander (m) / (Austria) Selina Egle & Lara Michaela Kipp (f)
  - Doubles Sprint winners: (Latvia) Mārtiņš Bots & Roberts Plūme (m) / (Austria) Selina Egle & Lara Michaela Kipp (f)
  - Team Relay winners: Germany
- December 15–16, 2023: World Cup #2 in (Canada) Whistler
  - Singles winners: (Germany) Max Langenhan (m) / (Germany) Julia Taubitz (f)
  - Doubles winners: (Germany) Tobias Wendl & Tobias Arlt (m) / (Germany) Jessica Degenhardt & Cheyenne Rosenthal (f)
- January 6–7: World Cup #3 in Winterberg
  - Singles winners: (Germany) Max Langenhan (m) / (Austria) Madeleine Egle (f)
  - Doubles winners: (Austria) Juri Gatt & Riccardo Schöpf (m) / (Germany) Jessica Degenhardt & Cheyenne Rosenthal (f)
  - Team Relay winners: Germany
- January 13–14: World Cup #4 in Innsbruck
  - Singles winners: (Austria) Jonas Müller (m) / (Austria) Madeleine Egle (f)
  - Doubles winners: (Austria) Thomas Steu & Wolfgang Kindl (m) / (Germany) Jessica Degenhardt & Cheyenne Rosenthal (f)
  - Team Relay winners: Austria
- February 3–4: World Cup #5 in (Germany) Altenberg
  - Singles winners: (Germany) Max Langenhan (m) / (Germany) Julia Taubitz (f)
  - Doubles winners: (Austria) Juri Gatt & Riccardo Schöpf (m) / (Italy) Andrea Vötter & Marion Oberhofer (f)
- February 10–11: World Cup #6 in (Germany) Oberhof
  - Singles winners: (Latvia) Kristers Aparjods (m) / (Germany) Merle Fräbel (f)
  - Doubles winners: (Austria) Thomas Steu & Wolfgang Kindl (m) / (Germany) Jessica Degenhardt & Cheyenne Rosenthal (f)
- February 17–18: World Cup #7 in (Germany) Oberhof
  - Singles winners: (Austria) Jonas Müller (m) / (Germany) Julia Taubitz (f)
  - Singles Sprint winners: (Germany) Max Langenhan (m) / (Germany) Julia Taubitz (f)
  - Doubles winners: (Austria) Thomas Steu & Wolfgang Kindl (m) / (Germany) Dajana Eitberger & Saskia Schirmer (f)
  - Doubles Sprint winners: (Germany) Hannes Orlamünder & Paul Constantin Gubitz (m) / (Austria) Selina Egle & Lara Michaela Kipp (f)
- February 24–25: World Cup #8 in (Latvia) Sigulda
  - Singles winners: (Germany) Felix Loch (m) / (Germany) Anna Berreiter (f)
  - Singles Sprint winners: (Germany) Felix Loch (m) / (Germany) Julia Taubitz (f)
  - Doubles winners: (Latvia) Mārtiņš Bots & Roberts Plūme (m) / (Germany) Jessica Degenhardt & Cheyenne Rosenthal (f)
  - Doubles Sprint winners: (Latvia) Mārtiņš Bots & Roberts Plūme (m) / (Italy) Andrea Vötter & Marion Oberhofer (f)
- March 1–2: World Cup #9 in (Latvia) Sigulda
  - Singles winners: (Latvia) Kristers Aparjods (m) / (Latvia) Elīna Ieva Vītola (f)
  - Doubles winners: (Latvia) Mārtiņš Bots & Roberts Plūme (m) / (Germany) Jessica Degenhardt & Cheyenne Rosenthal (f)
  - Team Relay winners: Germany

==== 2023–24 Junior Luge World Cup ====
- December 1–2, 2023: World Cup #1 in (United States) Park City
  - Singles winners: (Germany) Marco Leger (m) / (Canada) Embyr-Lee Susko (f)
  - Doubles winners: (Germany) Moritz Jager & Valentin Steudte (m) / (Ukraine) Natasha Khytrenko & Viktoriia Koval (f)
  - Team Relay winners: Germany
- December 2–3, 2023: World Cup #2 in Park City
  - Singles winners: (Germany) Timon Grancagnolo (m) / (Canada) Embyr-Lee Susko (f)
  - Doubles winners: (Germany) Moritz Jager & Valentin Steudte (m) / (Germany) Elisa-Marie Storch & Pauline Patz (f)
  - Team Relay winners: United States
- December 9–10, 2023: World Cup #3 in (Canada) Whistler
  - Singles winners: (Germany) Marco Leger (m) / (Canada) Embyr-Lee Susko (f)
  - Doubles winners: (United States) Marcus Mueller & Ansel Haugsjaa (m) / (Germany) Elisa-Marie Storch & Pauline Patz (f)
  - Team Relay winners: Germany
- January 12: World Cup #4 in (Germany) Winterberg
  - Singles winners: (Austria) Noah Kallan (m) / (Germany) Laura Koch (f)
  - Doubles winners: (Germany) Pascal Kunze & Max Trippner (m)
- January 19–20: World Cup #5 in (Austria) Bludenz
  - Singles winners: (Germany) Marco Leger (m) / (Germany) Alina Bräutigam (f)
  - Doubles winners: (Germany) Pascal Kunze & Max Trippner (m) / (Germany) Noemi Lietz & Regina Goldbrunner (f)
- February 2–3: World Cup #6 in (Switzerland) St. Moritz
  - Singles winners: (Latvia) Kaspars Rinks (m) / (Germany) Anka Jänicke (f)
  - Doubles winners: (United States) Marcus Mueller & Ansel Haugsjaa (m) / (Germany) Elisa-Marie Storch & Pauline Patz (f)
  - Team Relay winners: Latvia

=== Natural Track ===
World & Continental Championships

- February 3–4: 2024 FIL European Luge Natural Track Championships in Jaufental
  - Singles winners: (Italy) Patrick Pigneter (m) / (Italy) Evelin Lanthaler (f)
  - Doubles winners: (Austria) Maximilian Pichler & Nico Edlinger
  - Team competition winners: Italy
  - U23 Singles winners: (Italy) Fabian Brunner (m) / (Austria) Riccarda Rütz (f)
  - U23 Doubles winners: (Italy) Tobias Paur & Andreas Hofer
- February 9–11: 2024 FIL World Junior Luge Natural Track Championships in (Austria) Obdach-Winterleiten
  - Singles winners: (Italy) Tobias Paur (m) / (Austria) Riccarda Rütz (f)
  - Doubles winners: (Italy) Tobias Paur & Andreas Hofer
  - Team competition winners: Italy

2023–24 FIL Luge World Cup on Natural Track

- December 16–17, 2023: World Cup #1 in (Austria) Kühtai
  - Singles winners: (Italy) Patrick Pigneter (m) / (Italy) Evelin Lanthaler (f)
  - Doubles winners: (Italy) Peter Lambacher & Matthias Lambacher
- January 6–7: World Cup #2 in (Italy) Laas
  - Singles winners: (Italy) Daniel Gruber (m) / (Italy) Evelin Lanthaler (f)
  - Doubles winners: (Italy) Peter Lambacher & Matthias Lambacher
- January 19–21: World Cup #3 + Eliminator in (Austria) Umhausen
  - Singles winners: (Italy) Patrick Pigneter (m) / (Italy) Evelin Lanthaler (f)
  - Doubles winners: (Italy) Peter Lambacher & Matthias Lambacher
  - Eliminator Singles winners: (Italy) Patrick Pigneter (m) / (Italy) Evelin Lanthaler (f)
  - Eliminator Doubles winners: (Austria) Maximilian Pichler & Nico Edlinger
- February 1–2: World Cup #4 in (Italy) Jaufental
  - Singles winners: (Italy) Patrick Pigneter (m) / (Italy) Evelin Lanthaler (f)
  - Doubles winners: (Italy) Peter Lambacher & Matthias Lambacher
- February 15–16: World Cup #5 in (Romania) Vatra Dornei
  - Singles winners: (Italy) Fabian Brunner (m) / (Italy) Evelin Lanthaler (f)
  - Doubles winners: (Italy) Tobias Paur & Andreas Hofer
- February 17–18: World Cup #6 in (Romania) Vatra Dornei
  - Singles winners: (Italy) Patrick Pigneter (m) / (Italy) Evelin Lanthaler (f)
  - Doubles winners: (Italy) Peter Lambacher & Matthias Lambacher
- Overall Singles winners: (Italy) Patrick Pigneter (m) / (Italy) Evelin Lanthaler (f)
- Overall Doubles winners: (Italy) Peter Lambacher & Matthias Lambacher
- Overall Nations ranking winners: Italy

2023–24 FIL Junior Luge World Cup on Natural Track

- December 30–31, 2023: World Cup #1 in (Austria) Obdach-Winterleiten
  - Singles winners: (Italy) Alex Oberhofer (m) / (Austria) Riccarda Rütz (f)
  - Doubles winners: (Italy) Tobias Paur & Andreas Hofer
- January 4–5: World Cup #2 in (Italy) Ulten
  - Singles winners: (Slovenia) Žiga Kralj (m) / (Austria) Riccarda Rütz (f)
  - Doubles winners: (Italy) Tobias Paur & Andreas Hofer
- January 13–14: World Cup #3 in (Italy) Latsch
  - Singles winners: (Italy) Alex Oberhofer (m) / (Italy) Jenny Castiglioni (f)
  - Doubles winners: (Italy) Tobias Paur & Andreas Hofer
- January 27–28: World Cup #4 in (Austria) Umhausen
  - Singles winners: (Italy) Anton Gruber Genetti (m) / (Austria) Riccarda Rütz (f)
  - Doubles winners: (Italy) Tobias Paur & Andreas Hofer
- Overall Men's Singles winner: (Italy) Alex Oberhofer
- Overall Women's Singles winner: (Austria) Riccarda Rütz
- Overall Doubles winners: (Italy) Tobias Paur & Andreas Hofer

== Short track ==
- For Other 2023 / 2024 season results here.

=== World & Continental Championships ===
- November 3–5, 2023: 2024 Four Continents Short Track Speed Skating Championships in Laval
  - 500 m winners: (Canada) Steven Dubois (m) / (United States) Kristen Santos-Griswold (f)
  - 1000 m winners: (Canada) William Dandjinou (m) / (United States) Kristen Santos-Griswold (f)
  - 1500 m winners: (South Korea) Park Ji-won (m) / (United States) Kristen Santos-Griswold (f)
  - Relay winners: South Korea (m) / Canada (f)
  - Mixed relay winners: Canada
- January 12–14: 2024 European Short Track Speed Skating Championships in (Poland) Gdańsk
  - 500 m winners: (Italy) Pietro Sighel (m) / (Netherlands) Xandra Velzeboer (f)
  - 1000 m winners: (Italy) Pietro Sighel (m) / (Belgium) Hanne Desmet (f)
  - 1500 m winners: (Italy) Pietro Sighel (m) / (Italy) Elisa Confortola (f)
  - Relay winners: Netherlands (m) / Netherlands (f)
  - Mixed relay winners: Netherlands
- January 20–23: 2024 Winter Youth Olympics in (South Korea) Gangwon
  - 500 m winners: (United States) Sean Shuai (m) / (Poland) Anna Falkowska (w)
  - 1000 m winners: (China) Zhang Xinzhe (m) / (China) Li Jinzi (w)
  - 1500 m winners: (South Korea) Joo Jae-hee (m) / (China) Yang Jingru (w)
  - Mixed relay winners: China
- February 22–25: 2024 World Junior Short Track Speed Skating Championships in (Poland) Gdańsk
  - 500 m winners: (South Korea) Shin Dong-min (m) / (China) Wang Ye (f)
  - 1000 m winners: (South Korea) Shin Dong-min (m) / (China) Wang Ye (f)
  - 1500 m winners: (South Korea) Rim Jong-un (m) / (Hungary) Maja Dora Somodi (f)
  - Relay winners: South Korea (m) / Hungary (f)
  - Mixed relay winners: China
- March 15–17: 2024 World Short Track Speed Skating Championships in Rotterdam
  - 500 m winners: (China) Lin Xiaojun (m) / (Canada) Kim Boutin (f)
  - 1000 m winners: (Canada) William Dandjinou (m) / (United States) Kristen Santos-Griswold (f)
  - 1500 m winners: (China) Sun Long (m) / (South Korea) Kim Gil-li (f)
  - Relay winners: China (m) / Netherlands (f)
  - Mixed relay winners: China

=== 2023–24 ISU Short Track Speed Skating World Cup ===
- October 20–22, 2023: World Cup #1 in Montréal
  - 500 m winners: (China) Liu Shaoang (m) / (Netherlands) Xandra Velzeboer (f)
  - 1000 m (1) winners: (South Korea) Park Ji-won (m) / (United States) Kristen Santos-Griswold (f)
  - 1000 m (2) winners: (South Korea) Kim Gun Woo (m) / (South Korea) Kim Gil-li (f)
  - 1500 m winners: (South Korea) Hwang Dae-heon (m) / (Belgium) Hanne Desmet (f)
  - Relay winners: Canada (m) / Canada (f)
  - Mixed relay winners: China
- October 27–29, 2023: World Cup #2 in (Canada) Montréal
  - 500 m winners: (Canada) Jordan Pierre-Gilles (m) / (Canada) Rikki Doak (f)
  - 1000 m winners: (Netherlands) Jens van 't Wout (m) / (South Korea) Seo Whimin (f)
  - 1500 m (1) winners: (Canada) William Dandjinou (m) / (South Korea) Kim Gil-li (f)
  - 1500 m (2) winners: (South Korea) Park Ji-won (m) / (Belgium) Hanne Desmet (f)
  - Relay winners: China (m) / Netherlands (f)
  - Mixed relay winners: China
- December 8–10, 2023: World Cup #3 in (China) Beijing
  - 500 m (1) winners: (Canada) Jordan Pierre-Gilles (m) / (United States) Kristen Santos-Griswold (f)
  - 500 m (2) winners: (Canada) Jordan Pierre-Gilles (m) / (Netherlands) Xandra Velzeboer (f)
  - 1000 m winners: (China) Liu Shaoang (m) / (United States) Kristen Santos-Griswold (f)
  - 1500 m winners: (South Korea) Kim Gun Woo (m) / (South Korea) Kim Gil-li (f)
  - Relay winners: Canada (m) / Netherlands (f)
  - Mixed relay winners: Netherlands
- December 15–17, 2023: World Cup #4 in (South Korea) Seoul
  - 500 m winners: (China) Liu Shaoang (m) / (Netherlands) Xandra Velzeboer & (Netherlands) Selma Poutsma (f)
  - 1000 m winners: (Canada) Steven Dubois (m) / (Belgium) Hanne Desmet (f)
  - 1500 m (1) winners: (South Korea) Park Ji-won (m) / (South Korea) Kim Gil-li (f)
  - 1500 m (2) winners: (Canada) William Dandjinou (m) / (South Korea) Kim Gilli (f)
  - Relay winners: China (m) / Netherlands (f)
  - Mixed relay winners: Netherlands
- February 9–11: World Cup #5 in (Germany) Dresden
  - 500 m winners: (Canada) Félix Roussel (m) / (Netherlands) Xandra Velzeboer (f)
  - 1000 m (1) winners: (South Korea) Park Ji-won (m) / (South Korea) Kim Gilli (f)
  - 1000 m (2) winners: (South Korea) Park Ji-won (m) / (South Korea) Kim Gilli (f)
  - 1500 m winners: (Canada) William Dandjinou (m) / (Belgium) Hanne Desmet (f)
  - Relay winners: South Korea (m) / Netherlands (f)
  - Mixed relay winners: United States
- February 16–18: World Cup #6 in (Poland) Gdańsk
  - 500 m (1) winners: (South Korea) Seo Yi-ra (m) / (Netherlands) Selma Poutsma (f)
  - 500 m (2) winners: (Canada) Steven Dubois (m) / (Netherlands) Xandra Velzeboer (f)
  - 1000 m winners: (South Korea) Park Ji-won (m) / (United States) Kristen Santos-Griswold (f)
  - 1500 m winners: (Canada) Pascal Dion (m) / (United States) Kristen Santos-Griswold (f)
  - Relay winners: Canada (m) / Netherlands (f)
  - Mixed relay winners: Netherlands

=== 2023–24 ISU Junior Short Track Speed Skating World Cup ===
- November 25–26, 2023: World Cup #1 in (Netherlands) Leeuwarden
  - 500 m winners: (South Korea) Shin Dong-min (m) / (China) Zhang Jianing (f)
  - 1000 m (1) winners: (China) Li Kun (m) / (China) Lyu Wanyu (f)
  - 1000 m (2) winners: (South Korea) Rim Jong-un (m) / (China) Li Jinzi (f)
  - 1500 m winners: (South Korea) Rim Jong-un (m) / (South Korea) Oh Song-mi (f)
  - Mixed 2000 m relay winners: China
- December 2–3, 2023: World Cup #2 in (Netherlands) Leeuwarden
  - 500 m (1) winners: (South Korea) Shin Dong-min (m) / (China) Song Jiarui (f)
  - 500 m (2) winners: (South Korea) Shin Dong-min (m) / (South Korea) Yu Su-min (f)
  - 1000 m winners: (South Korea) Han Byeong-chan (m) / (China) Li Jinzi (f)
  - 1500 m winners: (South Korea) Rim Jong-un (m) / (South Korea) Yu Su-min (f)
  - 3000 m relay winners: China (m) / South Korea (f)
  - Mixed 2000 m relay winners: China
- February 17–18: World Cup #3 in (Netherlands) Heerenveen
  - 500 m winners: (United States) Sean Shuai (m) / (South Korea) Chung Jae-hee (f)
  - 1000 m winners: (South Korea) Rim Jong-un (m) / (South Korea) Chung Jae-hee (f)
  - 1500 m (1) winners: (South Korea) Shin Dong-min (m) / (South Korea) Yu Su-min (f)
  - 1500 m (2) winners: (South Korea) Rim Jong-un (m) / (China) Yang Jingru (f)
  - 3000 m relay winners: Canada (m) / South Korea (f)
  - Mixed 2000 m relay winners: South Korea

== Speed skating ==
- For Full 2023/2024 Season Results here.

=== World & Continental Championships ===
- January 5–7: 2024 European Speed Skating Championships in Heerenveen
  - 500 m winners: (Netherlands) Jenning de Boo (m) / (Netherlands) Femke Kok (f)
  - 1000 m winners: (Netherlands) Kjeld Nuis (m) / (Netherlands) Jutta Leerdam (f)
  - 1500 m winners: (Norway) Peder Kongshaug (m) / (Netherlands) Antoinette Rijpma-de Jong (f)
  - 3000 m women winner: (Netherlands) Marijke Groenewoud
  - 5000 m men winner: (Netherlands) Patrick Roest
  - Mass start winners: (Belgium) Bart Swings (m) / (Netherlands) Marijke Groenewoud (f)
  - Team pursuit winners: Norway (m) / Netherlands (f)
  - Team sprint winners: Poland (m) / Netherlands (f)
- January 19–21: 2024 ISU Four Continents Speed Skating Championships in Salt Lake City
  - 500 m winners: (Canada) Laurent Dubreuil (m) / (United States) Erin Jackson (f)
  - 1000 m winners: (United States) Jordan Stolz (m) / (Japan) Miho Takagi (f)
  - 1500 m winners: (Canada) Connor Howe (m) / (Japan) Miho Takagi (f)
  - 3000 m women winner: (Canada) Valerie Maltais
  - 5000 m men winner: (United States) Casey Dawson
  - Mass start winners: (South Korea) Chung Jae-Won (m) / (Canada) Ivanie Blondin (f)
  - Team pursuit winners: United States (m) / Canada (f)
  - Team sprint winners: Canada (m) / Japan (f)
- January 22–26: 2024 Winter Youth Olympics in (South Korea) Gangwon
  - 500 m winners: (Germany) Finn Sonnekalb (m) / (Netherlands) Angel Daleman (f)
  - 1500 m winners: (Germany) Finn Sonnekalb (m) / (Netherlands) Angel Daleman (f)
  - Mass start winners: (Germany) Finn Sonnekalb (m) / (Netherlands) Angel Daleman (f)
  - Team sprint winners: China
- February 9–11: 2024 World Junior Speed Skating Championships in Hachinohe
  - 500 m winners: (South Korea) Koo Kyung-min (m) / (Netherlands) Angel Daleman (f)
  - 1000 m winners: (South Korea) Koo Kyung-min (m) / (Netherlands) Angel Daleman (f)
  - 1500 m winners: (Norway) Didrik Eng Strand (m) / (Netherlands) Angel Daleman (f)
  - 3000 m women winner: (Norway) Aurora Grinden Løvås
  - 5000 m men winner: (Norway) Sigurd Henriksen
  - Mass start winners: (Japan) Yuta Fuchigami (m) / (Netherlands) Angel Daleman (f)
  - Team pursuit winners: Canada (m) / Japan (f)
  - Team sprint winners: Norway (m) / Netherlands (f)
- February 15–18: 2024 World Single Distances Speed Skating Championships in Calgary
  - 500 m winners: (United States) Jordan Stolz (m) / (Netherlands) Femke Kok (f)
  - 1000 m winners: (United States) Jordan Stolz (m) / (Japan) Miho Takagi (f)
  - 1500 m winners: (United States) Jordan Stolz (m) / (Japan) Miho Takagi (f)
  - 3000 m women winner: (Netherlands) Irene Schouten
  - 5000 m winners: (Netherlands) Patrick Roest (m) / (Netherlands) Joy Beune (f)
  - 10000 m men winner: (Italy) Davide Ghiotto
  - Mass start winners: (Belgium) Bart Swings (m) / (Netherlands) Irene Schouten (f)
  - Team pursuit winners: Italy (m) / Netherlands (f)
  - Team sprint winners: Canada (m) / Canada (f)
- March 7–8: 2024 World Sprint Speed Skating Championships in (Germany) Inzell
  - Winners: (China) Ning Zhongyan (m) / (Japan) Miho Takagi (f)
- March 9–10: 2024 World Allround Speed Skating Championships in (Germany) Inzell
  - Winners: (United States) Jordan Stolz (m) / (Netherlands) Joy Beune (f)

=== 2023–24 ISU Speed Skating World Cup ===
- November 10–12, 2023: World Cup #1 in Obihiro
  - 500 m #1 winners: (Japan) Tatsuya Shinhama (m) / (United States) Kimi Goetz (f)
  - 500 m #2 winners: (Japan) Wataru Morishige (m) / (Netherlands) Femke Kok (f)
  - 1000 m winners: (Japan) Masaya Yamada (m) / (Netherlands) Jutta Leerdam (f)
  - 1500 m winners: (Japan) Masaya Yamada (m) / (Japan) Miho Takagi (f)
  - 3000 m women winner: (Norway) Ragne Wiklund
  - 5000 m men winner: (Netherlands) Patrick Roest
  - Mass start winners: (Netherlands) Bart Hoolwerf (m) / (Canada) Ivanie Blondin (f)
  - Team pursuit winners: Norway (m) / Japan (f)
  - Mixed gender relay winners: Netherlands
- November 17–19, 2023: World Cup #2 in (China) Beijing
  - 500 m #1 winners: (Japan) Wataru Morishige (m) / (United States) Erin Jackson (f)
  - 500 m #2 winners: (Japan) Wataru Morishige (m) / (United States) Erin Jackson (f)
  - 1000 m winners: (Netherlands) Kjeld Nuis (m) / (Japan) Miho Takagi (f)
  - 1500 m winners: (Netherlands) Kjeld Nuis (m) / (Japan) Miho Takagi (f)
  - 3000 m women winner: (Norway) Ragne Wiklund
  - 5000 m men winner: (Netherlands) Patrick Roest
  - Mass start winners: (Italy) Andrea Giovannini (m) / (Netherlands) Marijke Groenewoud (f)
  - Team sprint winners: United States (m) / Netherlands (f)
- December 1–3, 2023: World Cup #3 in Stavanger
  - 500 m winners: (Japan) Wataru Morishige (m) / (South Korea) Kim Min-sun (f)
  - 1000 m winners: (Netherlands) Kjeld Nuis (m) / (Netherlands) Jutta Leerdam (f)
  - 1500 m winners: (United States) Jordan Stolz (m) / (Japan) Miho Takagi (f)
  - 3000 m women winner: (Czech Republic) Martina Sábliková
  - 10000 m men winner: (Italy) Davide Ghiotto
  - Mass start winners: (Netherlands) Marcel Bosker (m) / (Netherlands) Irene Schouten (f)
  - Team sprint winners: Norway (m) / United States (f)
- December 8–10, 2023: World Cup #4 in (Poland) Tomaszów Mazowiecki
  - 500 m #1 winners: (China) Gao Tingyu (m) / (South Korea) Kim Min-sun (f)
  - 500 m #2 winners: (Canada) Laurent Dubreuil (m) / (United States) Erin Jackson (f)
  - 1000 m winners: (United States) Jordan Stolz (m) / (Japan) Miho Takagi (f)
  - 1500 m winners: (Norway) Peder Kongshaug (m) / (Japan) Miho Takagi (f)
  - 3000 m women winner: (Norway) Ragne Wiklund
  - 5000 m men winner: (Netherlands) Patrick Roest
  - Mass start winners: (Italy) Andrea Giovannini (m) / (Netherlands) Irene Schouten (f)
  - Team pursuit winners: United States (m) / Japan (f)
- January 26–28: World Cup #5 in Salt Lake City
  - 500 m winners: (United States) Jordan Stolz (m) / (United States) Erin Jackson (f)
  - 1000 m 1# winners: (United States) Jordan Stolz (m) / (Japan) Miho Takagi (f)
  - 1000 m 2# winners: (United States) Jordan Stolz (m) / (United States) Kimi Goetz (f)
  - 1500 m winners: (United States) Jordan Stolz (m) / (Japan) Miho Takagi (f)
  - 3000 m women winner: (Netherlands) Joy Beune
  - 5000 m men winner: (Netherlands) Patrick Roest
  - Mass start winners: (South Korea) Chung Jae-won (m) / (Canada) Ivanie Blondin (f)
  - Team pursuit winners: United States (m) / Canada (f)
  - Mixed relay winner: China
- February 2–4: World Cup #6 in (Canada) Quebec City
  - 500 m #1 winners: (United States) Jordan Stolz (m) / (South Korea) Kim Min-sun (f)
  - 500 m #2 winners: (United States) Jordan Stolz (m) / (Netherlands) Femke Kok (f)
  - 1000 m winners: (United States) Jordan Stolz (m) / (Japan) Miho Takagi (f)
  - 1500 m winners: (United States) Jordan Stolz (m) / (Netherlands) Joy Beune (f)
  - 3000 m women winner: (Netherlands) Irene Schouten
  - 5000 m men winner: (Canada) Ted-Jan Bloemen
  - Mass start winners: (Japan) Shomu Sasaki (m) / (Belgium) Sandrine Tas (f)
  - Team sprint winners: Poland (m) / Netherlands (f)

=== 2023–24 ISU Junior Speed Skating World Cup ===
- November 25–26, 2023: World Cup #1 in Baselga di Piné
  - 500 m winners: (Japan) Issa Gunji (mj) / (Japan) Hana Noake (wj) / (South Korea) Oh Sang-hun (men neo-seniors) / (Kazakhstan) Inessa Shumekova (women neo-seniors)
  - 1000 m winners: (Japan) Issa Gunji (mj) / (Poland) Wiktoria Dąbrowska (wj) / (South Korea) Oh Sang-hun (men neo-seniors) / (Italy) Serena Pergher (women neo-seniors)
  - 1500 m winners: (Germany) Finn Sonnekalb (mj) / (Netherlands) Meike Veen (wj) / (Norway) Kasper Tveter (men neo-seniors) / (Italy) Laura Peveri (women neo-seniors)
  - 3000 m winners: (Czech Republic) Metoděj Jílek (mj) / (Norway) Aurora Grinden Løvås (wj) / (Germany) Bogdan Brauer (men neo-seniors) / (Italy) Laura Peveri (women neo-seniors)
  - Mass start winners: (Czech Republic) Metoděj Jílek (mj) / (South Korea) Cho Seo-yeon (wj) / (Germany) Gabriel Groß (men neo-seniors) / (Belgium) Fran Vanhoutte (women neo-seniors)
  - Team pursuit winners: Germany (mj) / Netherlands (wj) / Italy (men neo-seniors) / Norway (women neo-seniors)
- December 2–3, 2023: World Cup #2 in Collalbo
  - 500 m winners: (Japan) Issa Gunji (mj) / (South Korea) Jung Hui-dan (wj) / (South Korea) Oh Sang-hun (men neo-seniors) / (Kazakhstan) Margarita Artemjeva (women neo-seniors)
  - 1000 m winners: (South Korea) Koo Kyung-min (mj) / (Netherlands) Meike Veen (wj) / (South Korea) Kim Kyung-rae (men neo-seniors) / (Kazakhstan) Inessa Shumekova (women neo-seniors)
  - 1500 m winners: (Czech Republic) Metoděj Jílek (mj) / (Netherlands) Meike Veen (wj) / (Norway) Sigurd Holbø Dyrset (men neo-seniors) / (Italy) Laura Peveri (women neo-seniors)
  - 3000 m winners: (Czech Republic) Metoděj Jílek (mj) / (Norway) Aurora Grinden Løvås (wj) / (Germany) Gabriel Groß (men neo-seniors) / (Italy) Laura Peveri (women neo-seniors)
  - Mass start winners: (Czech Republic) Metoděj Jílek (mj) / (Japan) Hana Noake (wj) / (Norway) Sigurd Holbø Dyrset (men neo-seniors) / (Italy) Laura Peveri (women neo-seniors)
  - Mixed relay winners: Netherlands (Juniors) / Italy (Neo-seniors)
- February 3–4: World Cup #3 in (Japan) Hachinohe
  - 500 m winners: (Japan) Yuta Hirose (mj) / (Netherlands) Angel Daleman (wj) / (South Korea) Oh Sang-hun (men neo-seniors) / (Kazakhstan) Margarita Artemjeva (women neo-seniors)
  - 1000 m winners: (Japan) Issa Gunji (mj) / (Netherlands) Meike Veen (wj) / (South Korea) Kim Kyung-rae (men neo-seniors) / (Spain) Sara Cabrera (women neo-seniors)
  - 1500 m winners: (Czech Republic) Metoděj Jílek (mj) / (Netherlands) Meike Veen (wj) / (Estonia) Joonas Valge (men neo-seniors) / (Italy) Laura Peveri (women neo-seniors)
  - 3000 m winners: (Norway) Sigurd Henriksen (mj) / (Norway) Aurora Grinden Løvås (wj) / (Spain) Manuel Robla (men neo-seniors) / (Italy) Laura Peveri (women neo-seniors)
  - Mass start winners: (Czech Republic) Metoděj Jílek (mj) / (Japan) Hana Noake (wj) / (Estonia) Joonas Valge (men neo-seniors) / (Italy) Laura Peveri (women neo-seniors)
  - Team Sprint winners: Germany (mj) / Netherlands (wj) / Spain (men neo-seniors) / Kazakhstan (women neo-seniors)

== Synchronized skating ==
- 2023-24 Synchronized Skating Schedule here.

=== World Championships ===
- March 15–16: 2024 World Junior Synchronized Skating Championships in (Switzerland) Neuchâtel
  - Winners: (Canada) Team Les Supremes Junior
- April 5–6: 2024 World Synchronized Skating Championships in (Croatia) Zagreb
  - Winners: (Canada) Team Les Suprêmes

=== ISU Challenger Series ===
- January 11–14: 2024 CS Lumière Cup in (Netherlands) Eindhoven
  - Winners: (Finland) Team Marigold Ice Unity
- January 20–22: 2024 CS Budapest Cup in (Hungary) Budapest
  - Winners: (Canada) Team Les Suprêmes
- January 26–27: 2024 CS Trophy D'Ecosse in (United Kingdom) Dumfries
  - Winners: (Finland) Team Valley Bay Synchro Junior
- February 2–4: 2024 CS Hevelius Cup in (Poland) Gdańsk
  - Winners: (United States) Team Haydenettes
- February 10–11: 2024 CS Marie Lundmark Trophy in (Finland) Helsinki
  - Winners: (Finland) Team Helsinki Rockettes

=== Other ISU Events ===
- September 15–17, 2023: 2023 Sydney Synchronized Festival in (Australia) Sydney
  - Winners: (Queensland) Ice Storm Senior
- October 3–5, 2023: 2023 Shanghai Trophy in (China) Shanghai
  - Winners: (Germany) Team Berlin 1
- October 4–8, 2023: 2023 Finlandia Trophy in (Finland) Espoo
  - Winners: (Finland) Team Helsinki Rockettes
- December 14–17, 2023: 2023 Riga Amber Cup in (Latvia) Riga
  - Event was cancelled
- December 16–17, 2023: 2023 Santa Claus Cup in (Czech Republic) Brno
  - Winners: (Hungary) Team Passion
- December 13–14: 2023 Britannia Cup in TBD
  - Event was cancelled
- January 18–20: 2024 Mozart Cup in (Austria) Salzburg
  - Winners: (Finland) Marigold Ice Unity
- January 25–28: 2024 Leon Lurje Trophy in (Sweden) Gothenburg
  - Event was cancelled
- February 1–3: 2024 French Cup in (France) Rouen
  - Winners: (Finland) Helsinki Rockettes
- February 8–10: 2024 Open International in (France) Lyon
  - Event was cancelled
- February 9–10: 2024 Zagreb Snowflakes Trophy in (Croatia) Zagreb
  - Event was cancelled
- February 16–18: 2024 Spring Cup in (Italy) Sesto San Giovanni
  - Event was cancelled
- February 23–24: 2024 Dresden Cup in (Germany) Dresden
  - Winners: (Germany) Team Berlin 1
- March 1–3: 2024 Steel City Trophy in (United Kingdom) Sheffield
  - Winners: (United Kingdom) Team Icicles Senior

=== United States Synchro Events ===
- January 18–20: 2024 Eastern Synchronized Skating Sectional Championships in (United States) Durham
  - Winners: (United States) Ocean Blades, Warwick Figure Skaters
- January 18–20: 2024 Pacific Coast Synchronized Skating Sectional Championships in (United States) Irvine
  - Winners: (United States) Matrix (OAT), Glacier Falls FSC, Inc.
- January 24–28: 2024 Midwestern Synchronized Skating Sectional Championships in (Netherlands) Wichita
  - Winners: (United States) Austintatious Stars, Individual Member
- February 21–24: 2024 U.S. Synchronized Skating Championships in (United States) Las Vegas
  - Winners: (United States) Team Haydenettes (ST), SC of Boston
