= IBSF Junior World Championships 2022 =

- Venue: Olympic Sliding Centre Innsbruck
- Location: Innsbruck, Austria
- Dates: 21–23 January

The 2022 IBSF Junior World Championships in bobsleigh and skeleton took place in Innsbruck, Austria, from 21 to 23 January 2022.

== Schedule ==
Twelve events took place.

All times are local (UTC+1).

Bobsleigh

| Date | Time | Event |
|---|---|---|
| 22 January | 10:00 | Junior two-man |
| 22 January | 10:00 | U23 two-man |
| 22 January | 10:00 | Junior women's monobob |
| 22 January | 10:00 | U23 women's monobob |
| 23 January | 10:00 | Junior four-man |
| 23 January | 10:00 | U23 four-man |
| 23 January | 10:00 | Junior two-woman |
| 23 January | 10:00 | U23 two-woman |

Skeleton

| Date | Time | Event |
|---|---|---|
| 21 January | 09:00 | Junior women |
| 21 January | 09:00 | U20 women |
| 21 January | 13:30 | Junior men |
| 21 January | 13:30 | U20 men |

== Medal summary ==
=== Medal table ===
* Host nation (Austria)

| Rank | Nation | Gold | Silver | Bronze | Total |
|---|---|---|---|---|---|
| 1 | Germany | 6 | 4 | 3 | 13 |
| 2 | Russia | 4 | 4 | 2 | 10 |
| 3 | Slovakia | 1 | 1 | 1 | 3 |
| 4 | Latvia | 1 | 0 | 0 | 1 |
| 5 | Austria* | 0 | 1 | 1 | 2 |
| 5 | Romania | 0 | 1 | 1 | 2 |
| 7 | Switzerland | 0 | 1 | 0 | 1 |
| 8 | Belgium | 0 | 0 | 1 | 1 |
| 8 | Italy | 0 | 0 | 1 | 1 |
| 8 | Poland | 0 | 0 | 1 | 1 |
| Totals (10 entries) | | 12 | 12 | 11 | 35 |

=== Bobsleigh ===
==== Junior ====
| Event | Gold | | Silver | | Bronze | |
|---|---|---|---|---|---|---|
| Two-man | Germany; Maximilian Illmann; Lukas Koller | 1:44.16 | Switzerland; Timo Rohner; Luca Rolli | 1:44.38 | Germany; Jonas Jannusch; Benedikt Hertel | 1:44.44 |
| Four-man | Latvia; Dāvis Kaufmanis; Lauris Kaufmanis; Arnis Bebrišs; Ivo Dans Kleinbergs | 1:42.34 | Germany; Maximilian Illmann; Hannes Schenk; Lukas Koller; Henrik Proske | 1:42.36 | Germany; Jonas Jannusch; Benedikt Hertel; Felix Dahms; Christian Röder | 1:42.46 |
| Women's monobob | Maureen Zimmer; Germany | 1:52.17 | Lubov Chernykh; Russia | 1:52.60 | Viktória Čerňanská; Slovakia | 1:52.87 |
| Two-woman | Russia; Lubov Chernykh; Anastasia Kurysheva | 1:47.34 | Germany; Maureen Zimmer; Anabel Galander | 1:47.65 | Germany; Charlotte Candrix; Vanessa Mark | 1:47.89 |

==== U23 ====
| Event | Gold | | Silver | | Bronze | |
|---|---|---|---|---|---|---|
| Two-man | Germany; Laurin Zern; Rupert Schenk | 1:44.81 | Russia; Stepan Dubinko; Aleksei Kislitsa | 1:44.93 | Austria; Jakob Mandlbauer; Daiyehan Nichols-Bardi | 1:45.66 |
| Four-man | Russia; Stepan Dubinko; Nikita Ivanov; Aleksei Kislitsa; Egor Gryaznov | 1:42.73 | Austria; Markus Kaiser; Daiyehan Nichols-Bardi; Luca Volgger; Dominik Hanschitz | 1:44.45 | Only two sleds entered | |
| Women's monobob | Viktória Čerňanská; Slovakia | 1:52.87 | Georgeta Popescu; Romania | 1:53.07 | Julia Słupecka; Poland | 1:54.11 |
| Two-woman | Germany; Diana Filipszki; Lauryn Siebert | 1:48.50 | Slovakia; Viktória Čerňanská; Patrícia Tajcnárová | 1:48.93 | Romania; Georgeta Popescu; Antonia Sârbu | 1:49.48 |

=== Skeleton ===
==== Junior ====
| Event | Gold | | Silver | | Bronze | |
|---|---|---|---|---|---|---|
| Men | Evgeniy Rukosuev; Russia | 1:44.71 | Lukas David Nydegger; Germany | 1:45.35 | Amedeo Bagnis; Italy | 1:45.67 |
| Women | Susanne Kreher; Germany | 1:48.82 | Tabitha Stoecker; Great Britain | 1:49.46 | Anastasiia Tsyganova; Russia | 1:49.69 |

==== U20 ====
| Event | Gold | | Silver | | Bronze | |
|---|---|---|---|---|---|---|
| Men | Lukas David Nydegger; Germany | 1:45.35 | Dmitrii Grevtsev; Russia | 1:46.05 | Bogdan Popov; Russia | 1:46.16 |
| Women | Anastasiia Tsyganova; Russia | 1:49.69 | Polina Tiurina; Russia | 1:50.01 | Aline Pelckmans; Belgium | 1:50.41 |
