= Ellie Kleinheinz =

American luger and 2024 Youth Olympian

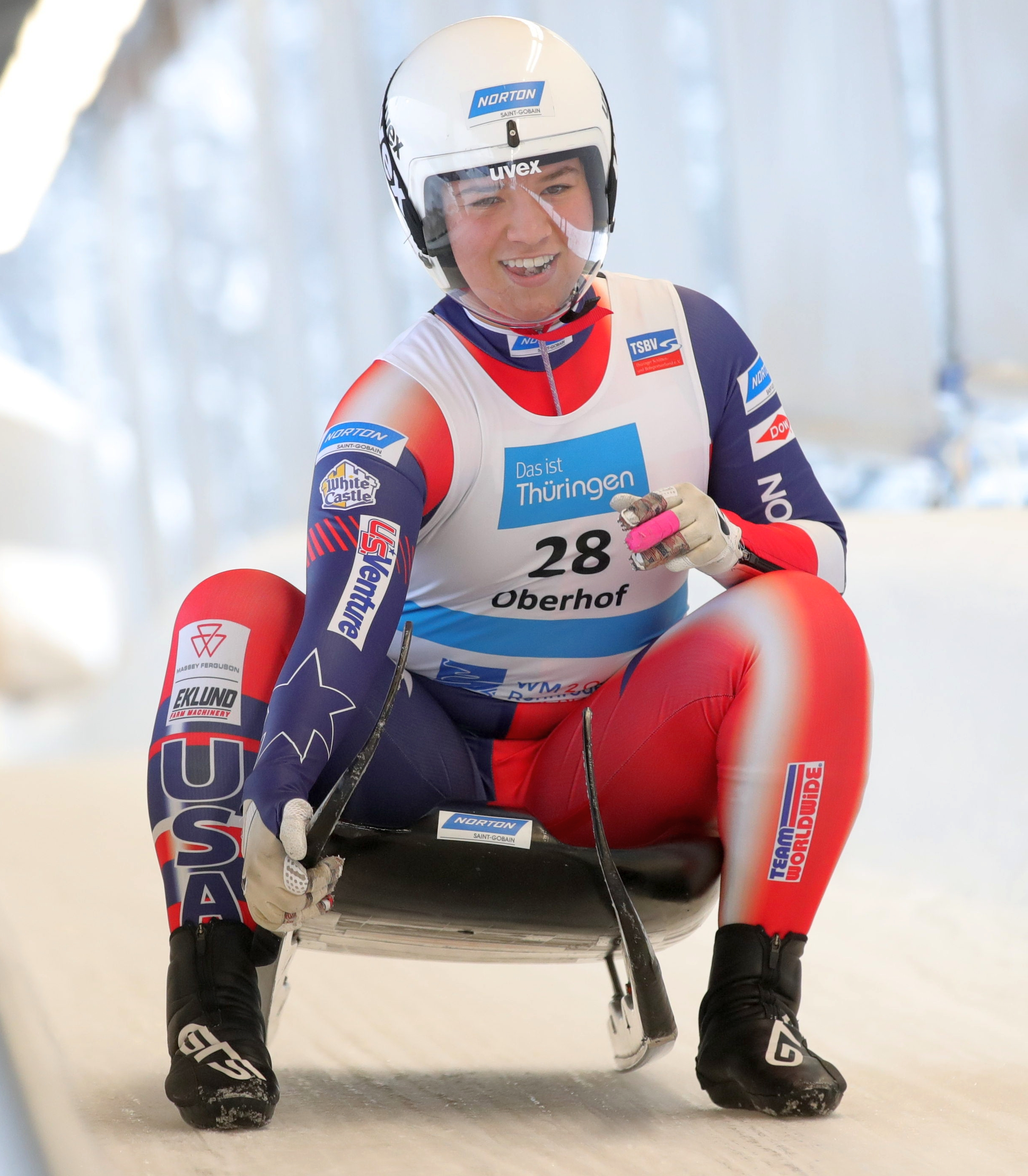
- Ellie Kleinheinz in 2023

Personal information
- Nationality: American
- Born: September 8, 2007 (age 19)
- Home town: Santa Clara, California, U.S.A.
- Height: 5 ft 5 in (1.64 m)

Sport
- Sport: Luge
- Event: Singles
Medal record
Women's Luge
Representing the United States
US National Championships
Gold medal – first place	2026 Junior Nationals	Women's singles
Gold medal – first place	2025 Junior Nationals	Women's singles
Gold medal – first place	2023 Youth Nationals	Women's singles
Gold medal – first place	2020 Youth Nationals	Women's singles
Junior World Cup
Bronze medal – third place	2026 Lillehammer, Norway	Team Relay
Junior America Pacific Championships
Gold medal – first place	2026 Lillehammer, Norway	Women's singles
Empire State Games
Gold medal – first place	2022 Lake Placid, NY	Women's singles
Gold medal – first place	2020 Lake Placid, NY	Women's singles

Elizabeth "Ellie" Kleinheinz (born September 8, 2007) is an American luger and four-time U.S. national champion (Youth 2022 & 2023, Junior 2025 & 2026).

She represented the United States in the 2024 Winter Youth Olympics in Pyeongchang, South Korea and is currently active on the Junior World Cup circuit.

Kleinheinz attended Archbishop Mitty High School in San Jose, California, where she was a member of the Monarchs' field hockey and softball teams. She graduated as part of the class of 2025. In the fall of 2025 she enrolled at Salem State University in Salem, Massachusetts where she plays collegiate softball for the Salem Vikings Softball Team.

== Luge Beginnings ==
Kleinheinz began her luge career at the age of 11 after attending a White Castle Slider Search in Palo Alto, CA put on by USA Luge. She was taught the basics of riding a luge sled, including positioning, steering and stopping. After showing promise in the summer program she was invited to Lake Placid, NY, in the winter of 2019 to try luge on ice at the USA Luge training facility at Mount Van Hovenberg. As one of the top young athletes from the Slide Search groups she was selected for the U.S. Development Team (previously known as the D Team).

== Youth Career ==
Ellie won her first individual luge medal, gold, at the 2020 Empire State Games held in Lake Placid, NY. She returned to Lake Placid in 2022 to claim a second gold medal at the same event.

In 2020, Kleinheinz captured her first national title by winning the USA Luge Youth B (ages 13 and under) National Championship. Her performance earned her a promotion to the U.S. Candidate Team (previously known as the C Team), a developmental tier within USA Luge. As part of her advancement, at the age of 15, she traveled internationally to train and compete in Bludenz, Austria, and Sigulda, Latvia. Upon returning to the United States, she was one of three female athletes to qualify for the 2023 Asian Continental Cup in South Korea, based on her accumulated points.

In 2023, Kleinheinz continued her winning streak by securing the Youth A National Championship (14–18 age group). She went on to represent the United States in the women’s singles luge event at the 2024 Winter Youth Olympics in Pyeongchang, South Korea, where she led the U.S. women's squad finishing 18th.

== Junior Career ==
Prior to the 2024–25 luge season, Kleinheinz was officially named to the USA Luge Junior National Team, recognizing her consistent performance and potential for future international success. She competed in the Junior World Cup, racing on tracks in Winterberg and Oberhof, Germany, as well as Sigulda, Latvia. She participated in both the women’s singles and the team relay events, gaining valuable international experience against top junior athletes from across Europe.

At age 17, Kleinheinz won the 2025 Norton Junior National Championship in the women’s division (under 21 years old) in Park City, Utah. Her victory marked a historic milestone, as she became one of the few athletes to win gold in every national category she had entered—Youth B, Youth A, and Junior. Her four-run combined time of 3:00.871 secured her place at the top of the junior standings.

Kleinheinz returned to the U.S. Junior National Team for the 2025-26 season. Despite the U.S. not participating in the first two Junior World Cup Events, Kleinheinz finished in the Top 20 overall in the Junior World Cup Points standings. In February 2026, Ellie combined with Logan Barnes (men's singles) and the doubles team of Nate Bivins and Wolfgang Lux to win the bronze medal in the team relay event at the Olympic track in Lillehammer, Norway—her first team international medal. Kleinheinz capped off the season by winning the gold medal and the 2026 Norton Junior National Championship in Lake Placid on March 15, 2026.
