= Lauris Kaufmanis =

Latvian bobsledder (born 1998)

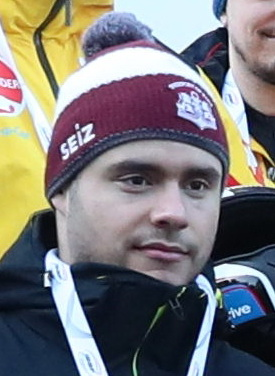
- Kaufmanis in 2020

Personal information
- Born: 16 April 1998 (age 28) Bauska, Latvia
- Height: 184 cm (6 ft 0 in)
- Weight: 102 kg (225 lb)

Sport
- Country: Latvia
- Sport: Bobsleigh
- Event: Four-man
Medal record
Men's bobsleigh
Representing Latvia
Junior World Championships
Gold medal – first place	2022 Innsbruck	Four-man
Junior European Championships U23
Silver medal – second place	2019 Innsbruck	Four-man

Lauris Kaufmanis (born 16 April 1998) is a Latvian bobsledder. He represented Latvia at the 2026 Winter Olympics.

== Career ==
Kaufmanis began in sports as a track and field athlete, specializing in shot put and discus throw. He broke multiple national junior records in these sports while competing. He competed at the 2017 European Athletics U20 Championships, where he finished 12th in shot put. He also participated in discus throw at the event, but did not advance from his qualifying group.

Kaufmanis began competing in bobsleigh in 2018 as a push athlete, pushing for the team of his brother Dāvis. He made his debut in the Bobsleigh World Cup the following year pushing for Oskars Ķibermanis, and earned his first World Cup medal at the four-man event at Lake Placid. He has since won four additional medals in World Cup competition. In 2022, Kaufmanis earned a gold medal in four-man at the Junior World Championships as a pushman for his brother Dāvis' team.

In 2026, Kaufmanis was selected to represent Latvia at the Winter Olympics, pushing for the team of Jēkabs Kalenda in four-man. The team placed 10th in the event.

== Bobsleigh results ==
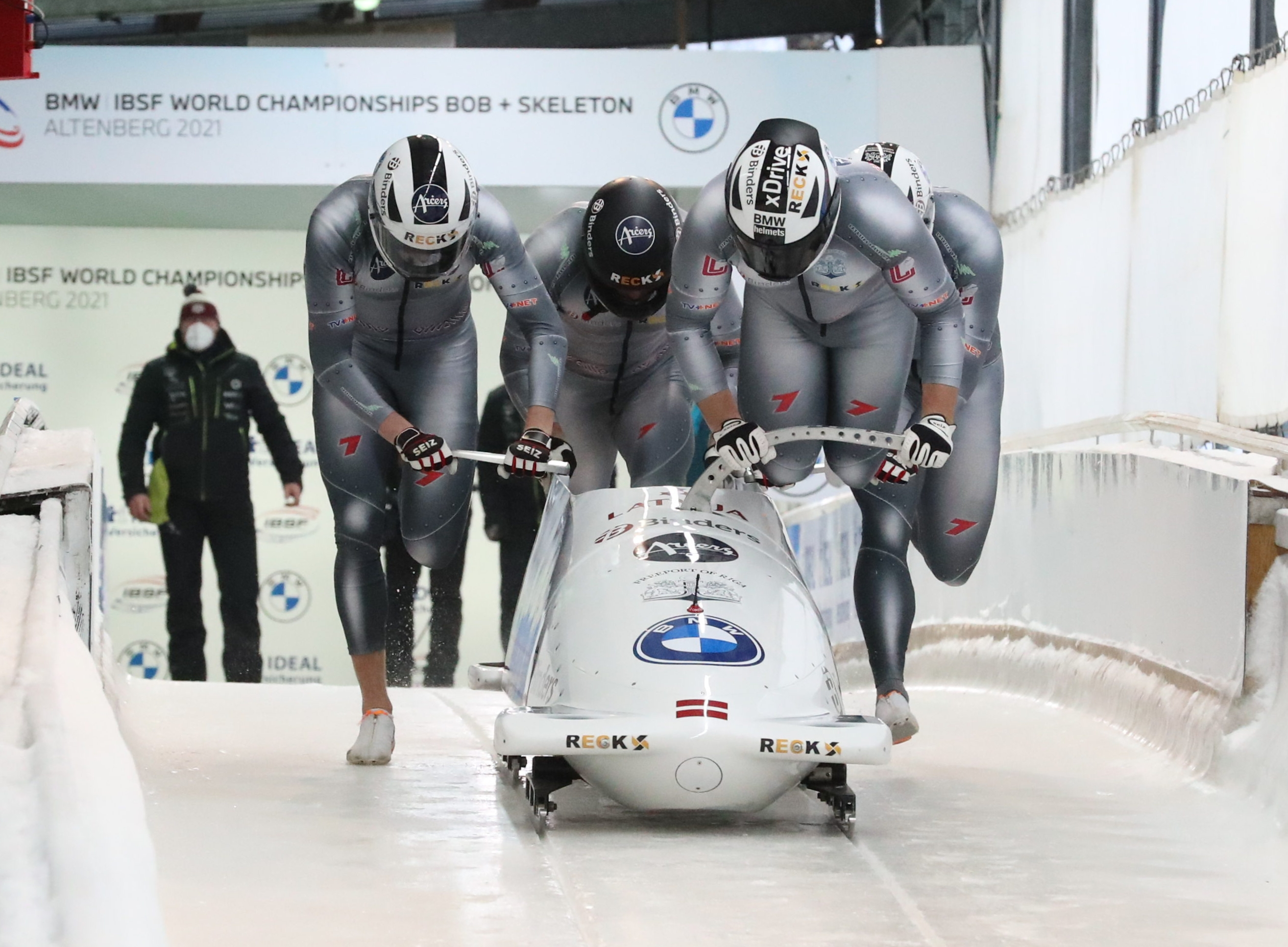
Kaufmanis pushing for the team of Oskars Melbārdis at Altenberg in 2021.

All results are sourced from the International Bobsleigh and Skeleton Federation (IBSF).

=== Olympic Games ===
Event	Four-man
(Italy) 2026 Milano Cortina	10th

=== World Championships ===
Event	Four-man
(Germany) 2020 Altenberg	4th
(Germany) 2021 Altenberg	8th
(Switzerland) 2023 St. Moritz	DNF
