= 2025 Junior World Luge Championships =

- Venue: St. Moritz-Celerina Olympic Bobrun
- Location: St. Moritz, Switzerland
- Dates: 1–2 February

The 40th Junior World Luge Championships took place under the auspices of the International Luge Federation in St. Moritz, Switzerland from 1 to 2 February 2025.

== Schedule ==
Five events were held.

All times are local (UTC+1).

Date	Time	Events
1 February	8:30	Junior women 1st run
1 February	8:30	Junior women 2nd run
1 February	11:00	Junior doubles women 1st run
1 February	11:00	Junior doubles women 2nd run
1 February	11:00	Junior doubles men 1st run
1 February	11:00	Junior doubles men 2nd run
2 February	8:30	Junior men 1st run
2 February	8:30	Junior men 2nd run
2 February	11:00	Team relay

== Medalists ==
Event	Gold		Silver		Bronze	
Junior men's singles	Paul Socher; Austria	2:20.113	Marco Leger; Germany	2:20.236	Noah Kallan; Austria	2:20.393
Junior women's singles	Margita Sirsniņa; Latvia	1:51.159	Josephine Buse; Germany	1:51.191	Antonia Pietschmann; Germany	1:51.280
Junior men's doubles	Germany; Silas Sartor; Liron Raimer	1:50.278	Germany; Louis Grünbeck; Maximilian Kührt	1:50.378	Latvia; Raimonds Baltgalvis; Uldis Jakseboga	1:50.591
Junior women's doubles	Germany; Elisa-Marie Storch; Pauline Patz	1:52.410	Italy; Alexandra Oberstolz; Katharina Sofie Kofler	1:52.886	Germany; Sarah Pflaume; Lina Peterseim	1:54.247
Team relay	Austria; Annina Grundböck; Paul Socher; Johannes Scharnagl / Moritz Schiegl	2:45.519	Germany; Josephine Buse; Marco Leger; Silas Sartor / Liron Raimer	2:46.015	Latvia; Margita Sirsniņa; Edvards Marts Markitāns; Raimonds Baltgalvis / Uldis Jakseboga	2:47.450

== Medal table ==
* Host nation (Switzerland)

Rank	Nation	Gold	Silver	Bronze	Total
1	Germany	2	4	2	8
2	Austria	2	0	1	3
3	Latvia	1	0	2	3
4	Italy	0	1	0	1
Totals (4 entries)		5	5	5	15
