= IBSF Junior World Championships 2021 =

- Venue: St. Moritz-Celerina Olympic Bobrun
- Location: St. Moritz, Switzerland
- Dates: 22–24 January 2021

The 2021 IBSF Junior World Championships in bobsleigh and skeleton took place in St. Moritz, Switzerland, from 22 to 24 January 2021.

== Schedule ==
Ten events took place.

All times are local (UTC+1).

Bobsleigh

Date	Time	Event
22 January	09:00	Junior two-woman
22 January	09:00	Under-23 two-woman
22 January	13:30	Junior two-man
22 January	13:30	Under-23 two-man
24 January	09:00	Junior four-man
24 January	09:00	Under-23 four-man

Skeleton

Date	Time	Event
23 January	09:00	Junior women
23 January	09:00	Under-20 women
23 January	13:30	Junior men
23 January	13:30	Under-20 men

== Medal summary ==
=== Medal table ===
* Host nation (Switzerland)

Rank	Nation	Gold	Silver	Bronze	Total
1	Germany	4	5	1	10
2	Russia	3	1	1	5
3	Switzerland*	1	2	2	5
4	Romania	1	0	1	2
5	France	1	0	0	1
6	Latvia	0	2	0	2
7	Austria	0	0	1	1
7	Great Britain	0	0	1	1
7	Slovakia	0	0	1	1
Totals (9 entries)		10	10	8	28

=== Bobsleigh ===
==== Junior ====
Event	Gold		Silver		Bronze	
Two-man	Germany; Hans-Peter Hannighofer; Christian Röder	2:15.17	Switzerland; Michael Vogt; Sandro Michel	2:15.47	Romania; Mihai Cristian Tentea; Nicolae Ciprian Daroczi	2:16.19
Four-man	Switzerland; Michael Vogt; Silvio Weber; Sandro Michel; Andreas Haas	2:10.25	Germany; Jonas Jannusch; Henrik Bosse; Max Neumann; Bastian Heber	2:11.11	Germany; Maximilian Illmann; Hannes Schenk; Eric Strauß; Felix Dahms	2:11.25
Two-woman	Germany; Laura Nolte; Deborah Levi	2:19.55	Germany; Lisa Buckwitz; Cynthia Kwofie	2:20.02	Switzerland; Melanie Hasler; Nadja Pasternack	2:20.51

==== Under-23 ====
Event	Gold		Silver		Bronze	
Two-man	Romania; Mihai Cristian Tentea; Nicolae Ciprian Daroczi	2:16.19	Latvia; Dāvis Kaufmanis; Ivo Dans Kleinbergs	2:18.08	Russia; Vyacheslav Popov; Egor Gryaznov	2:18.83
Four-man	Russia; Vyacheslav Popov; Dmitrii Abramov; Andrey Andriyanov; Egor Gryaznov	2:13.32	Only one sled entered			
Two-woman	France; Margot Boch; Madison Stringer	2:21.92	Russia; Anastasiia Makarova; Anastasia Kurysheva	2:22.12	Slovakia; Viktória Čerňanská; Patrícia Horváthová	2:24.55

=== Skeleton ===
==== Junior ====
Event	Gold		Silver		Bronze	
Men	Evgeniy Rukosuev; Russia	2:16.63	Felix Keisinger; Germany	2:16.75	Samuel Maier; Austria	2:17.34
Women	Hannah Neise; Germany	2:22.03	Susanne Kreher; Germany	2:22.39	Ashleigh Fay Pittaway; Great Britain	2:22.83

==== Under-20 ====
Event	Gold		Silver		Bronze	
Men	Lukas David Nydegger; Germany	2:18.75	Elvis Veinbergs; Latvia Livio Summermatter; Switzerland	2:20.52	Not awarded	
Women	Anastasiia Tsyganova; Russia	2:23.20	Stefanie Votz; Germany	2:23.63	Jill Gander; Switzerland	2:24.62

== See also ==
- IBSF World Championships 2021
- IBSF European Championships 2021
