= IBSF World Championships 2021 – Two-man =

Two-man at the IBSF World Championships 2021
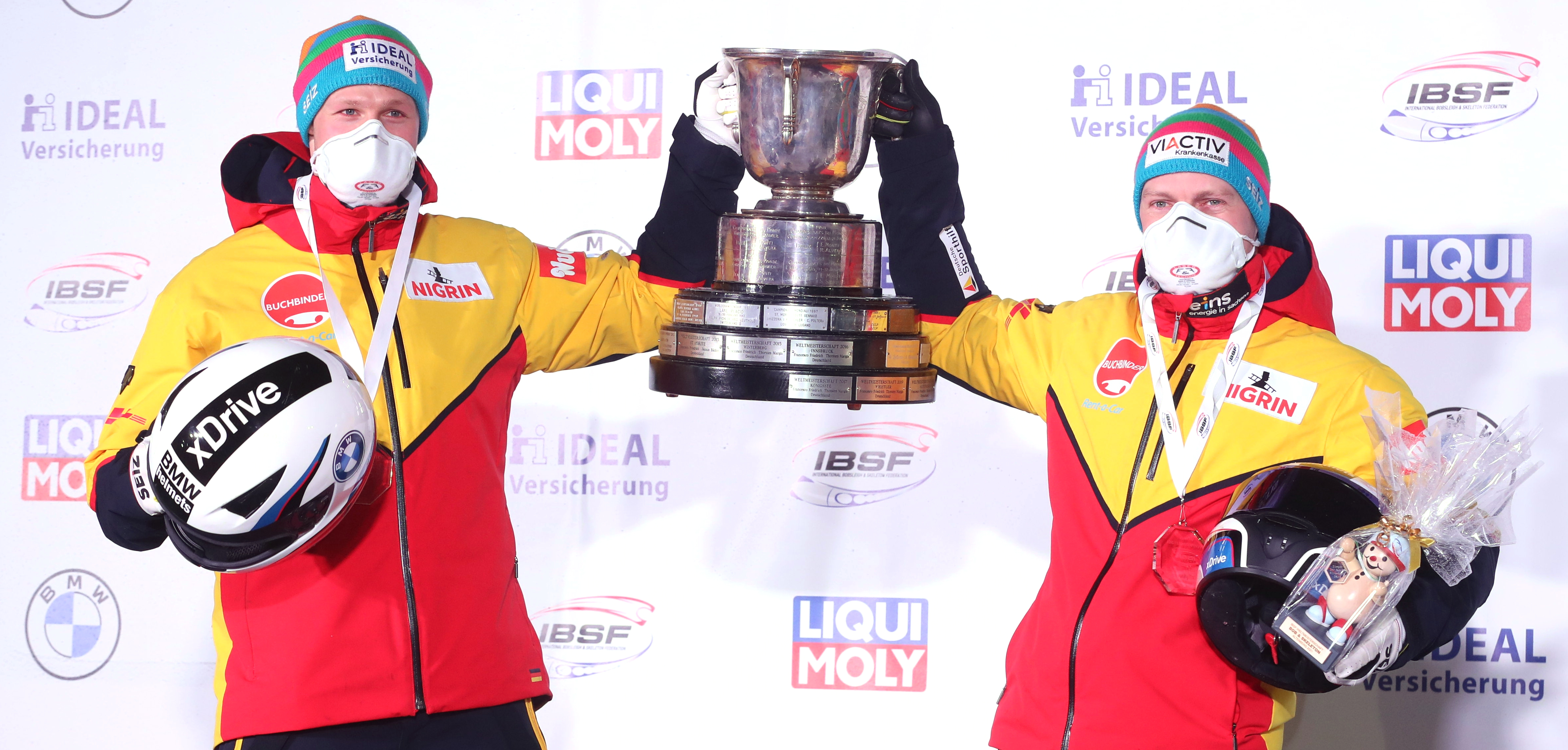
- Two-man bobsleigh Medal Ceremony (Bobsleigh & Skeleton World Championships Altenberg 2021)
- Venue: Altenberg bobsleigh, luge, and skeleton track
- Location: Altenberg, Germany
- Dates: 6–7 February
- Competitors: 53 from 14 nations
- Teams: 25
- Winning time: 3:39.78

Medalists
gold medal	Francesco Friedrich; Alexander Schüller	Germany
silver medal	Johannes Lochner; Eric Franke	Germany
bronze medal	Hans-Peter Hannighofer; Christian Röder	Germany

The Two-man competition at the IBSF World Championships 2021 was held on 6 and 7 February 2021.

== Results ==
The first two runs were started on 6 February at 10:00 and the last two runs on 7 February at 14:30.

Rank	Bib	Country	Athletes	Run 1	Rank	Run 2	Rank	Run 3	Rank	Run 4	Rank	Total	Behind
1st place, gold medalist(s)	4	Germany	Francesco Friedrich; Alexander Schüller	54.83	1	55.41	1	54.64	1	54.90	1	3:39.78	
2nd place, silver medalist(s)	5	Germany	Johannes Lochner; Eric Franke	55.37	3	55.75	2	55.24	2	55.47	3	3:41.83	+2.05
3rd place, bronze medalist(s)	18	Germany	Hans-Peter Hannighofer; Christian Röder	55.46	5	55.81	3	55.33	3	55.41	2	3:42.01	+2.23
4	9	Switzerland	Simon Friedli; Andreas Haas	55.51	6	55.88	5	55.35	4	55.63	5	3:42.37	+2.59
5	8	Switzerland	Michael Vogt; Sandro Michel	55.35	2	55.82	4	55.43	5	55.81	10	3:42.41	+2.63
6	7	Latvia	Oskars Ķibermanis; Matīss Miknis	55.42	4	56.01	11	55.53	6	55.76	6	3:42.72	+2.94
7	11	Germany	Christoph Hafer; Christian Hammers	55.55	8	55.93	8	55.58	7	55.76	6	3:42.82	+3.04
8	13	France	Romain Heinrich; Dorian Hauterville	55.55	8	55.96	9	55.62	8	55.88	15	3:43.01	+3.23
9	22	Canada	Christopher Spring; Mike Evelyn	55.78	13	56.04	12	55.70	10	55.61	4	3:43.13	+3.35
10	21	Canada	Justin Kripps; Cameron Stones	55.76	12	55.92	6	55.71	11	55.86	14	3:43.25	+3.47
11	14	Great Britain	Brad Hall; Greg Cackett	55.65	10	56.13	14	55.86	14	55.84	13	3:43.48	+3.70
12	10	Latvia	Oskars Melbārdis; Krists Lindenblats	55.52	7	56.14	15	55.68	9	56.15	19	3:43.49	+3.71
13	20	Austria	Markus Treichl; Sebastian Mitterer	55.83	15	56.00	10	55.95	16	55.77	8	3:43.55	+3.77
14	12	Bobsleigh Federation of Russia	Rostislav Gaitiukevich; Ilya Malykh	55.73	11	56.25	16	55.83	13	55.79	9	3:43.60	+3.82
15	24	South Korea	Won Yun-jong; Seo Young-woo (Run 1–2); Jung Hyun-woo (Run 3–4)	55.89	18	55.92	6	55.94	15	55.90	17	3:43.65	+3.87
15	6	Czech Republic	Dominik Dvořák; Jakub Nosek	55.81	14	56.26	17	55.77	12	55.81	10	3:43.65	+3.87
17	15	Romania	Mihai Cristian Tentea; Nicolae Ciprian Daroczi (Run 1–2); Raul Constantin Dobre (Run 3–4)	56.02	21	56.37	19	56.01	18	55.83	12	3:44.23	+4.45
18	2	Italy	Patrick Baumgartner; Eric Fantazzini	55.94	19	56.10	13	56.15	19	56.05	18	3:44.24	+4.46
19	19	Bobsleigh Federation of Russia	Alexey Stulnev; Vladislav Zharovtsev	56.23	22	56.35	18	55.95	16	55.88	15	3:44.41	+4.63
20	1	Great Britain	Lamin Deen; James Dasaolu	55.86	17	56.41	20	56.35	21	56.29	20	3:44.91	+5.13
21	23	Latvia	Emīls Cipulis; Arnis Bebrišs	56.29	23	56.96	22	56.40	22	Did not advance			
22	3	South Korea	Suk Young-jin; Jang Ki-kun	56.40	24	57.18	23	56.25	20	Did not advance			
23	17	Netherlands	Ivo de Bruin; Janko Franjic	55.96	20	56.69	21	1:01.98	24	Did not advance			
24	25	Australia	Evan O'Hanlon; Joseph Williamson (Run 1–2); Dylan Sorensen (Run 3)	58.52	25	58.90	24	58.28	23	Did not advance			
	16	Austria	Benjamin Maier; Markus Sammer	55.84	16	1:03.29	25	Did not start					
