= Bobsleigh at the 2020 Winter Youth Olympics – Girls' monobob =

Girls' monobob at the III Winter Youth Olympic Games
- Venue: St. Moritz-Celerina Olympic Bobrun
- Dates: 19 January
- Competitors: 18 from 15 nations
- Winning time: 2:26.84

Medalists
1st place, gold medalist(s)		Georgeta Popescu	Romania
2nd place, silver medalist(s)		Viktória Čerňanská	Slovakia
3rd place, bronze medalist(s)		Celine Harms	Germany

The girls' monobob competition at the 2020 Winter Youth Olympics took place on 19 January at the St. Moritz-Celerina Olympic Bobrun.

== Results ==
The first run was held at 12:00 and the second run at 13:15.

Rank	Start No.	Sled No.	Athlete	Country	Run 1	Rank 1	Run 2	Rank 2	Total	Behind
1st place, gold medalist(s)	5	4	Georgeta Popescu	Romania	1:13.44	1	1:13.40	1	2:26.84	
2nd place, silver medalist(s)	1	5	Viktória Čerňanská	Slovakia	1:13.83	3	1:13.52	2	2:27.35	+0.51
3rd place, bronze medalist(s)	7	2	Celine Harms	Germany	1:13.68	2	1:13.68	3	2:27.36	+0.52
4	8	1	Maja Wagner	Germany	1:13.87	4	1:13.80	4	2:27.67	+0.83
5	2	11	Camila Copain	France	1:14.23	5	1:13.87	5	2:28.10	+1.26
6	11	9	Emily Kilburn	Switzerland	1:14.66	6	1:14.14	6	2:28.80	+1.96
7	17	16	Loreta Beķerniece	Latvia	1:14.95	8	1:14.65	8	2:29.60	+2.76
8	16	17	Simone Zanghellini	Liechtenstein	1:15.00	9	1:14.64	7	2:29.64	+2.80
9	6	13	Joo Hyeong-won	South Korea	1:15.25	12	1:14.73	9	2:29.98	+3.14
10	12	8	Emma Sofie Brumoen	Norway	1:14.83	7	1:15.24	12	2:30.07	+3.23
11	13	15	Sara Snyder	Switzerland	1:15.14	10	1:14.94	11	2:30.08	+3.24
12	15	6	Charlotte Longden	Great Britain	1:15.45	13	1:14.75	10	2:30.20	+3.36
13	14	3	Antonia Sârbu	Romania	1:15.20	11	1:15.51	13	2:30.71	+3.87
14	3	12	Maddy Cohen	United States	1:16.06	15	1:15.91	15	2:31.97	+5.13
15	10	7	Maude Crossland	Colombia	1:15.89	14	1:16.26	16	2:32.15	+5.31
16	18	18	Elvira Moiseenko	Russia	1:16.23	16	1:16.38	17	2:32.61	+5.77
17	9	14	Emma Johnsen	Canada	1:16.88	17	1:15.75	14	2:32.63	+5.79
18	4	10	Lin Yu-hsin	Chinese Taipei	1:16.98	18	1:16.49	18	2:33.47	+6.63
