= Shanwayne Stephens =

Jamaican bobsledder (born 1990)

Personal information
- Born: October 19 1990 Port Antonio, Jamaica
- Height: 1.7 m (5 ft 7 in)
- Weight: 187 lb (85 kg; 13 st 5 lb)

Sport
- Country: Jamaica
- Sport: Bobsleigh
- Event(s): Two-man; Four-man

Lance Corporal Shanwayne Stephens (born 19 October 1990) is a Jamaican bobsledder who competed at the 2022 Winter Olympics in both the two and four-man bobsleigh events for Jamaica. His teams placed last in both events.

Stephens' family moved to the United Kingdom in 2002, when he was 11 and took up bobsleigh in 2014 with the RAF before he started training with the Jamaican bobsled team in 2017. He is currently based in Peterborough.

His teammates in the four-man bobsleigh at the 2022 Winter Olympics were Ashley Watson, Rolando Reid and Matthew Wekpe. In the two-man he competed alongside Nimroy Turgott.
