= Luge at the 2024 Winter Youth Olympics – Women's singles =

Women's singles at the IV Winter Youth Olympic Games
- Venue: Alpensia Sliding Centre
- Dates: 20 January
- Competitors: 31 from 20 nations
- Winning time: 1:35.774

Medalists
1st place, gold medalist(s)		Antonia Pietschmann	Germany
2nd place, silver medalist(s)		Alexandra Oberstolz	Italy
3rd place, bronze medalist(s)		Marie Riedl	Austria

The women's singles luge at the 2024 Winter Youth Olympics will take place on 20 January at the Alpensia Sliding Centre.

== Results ==
The first run was held at 08:30 and the second run at 09:40.

Rank	Bib	Athlete	Country	Run 1	Rank 1	Run 2	Rank 2	Total	Behind
1st place, gold medalist(s)	12	Antonia Pietschmann	Germany	47.985	1	47.789	1	1:35.774	
2nd place, silver medalist(s)	6	Alexandra Oberstolz	Italy	48.205	2	48.121	2	1:36.326	+0,552
3rd place, bronze medalist(s)	5	Marie Riedl	Austria	48.250	3	48.678	5	1:36.928	+1.154
4	7	Melina Hänsch	Germany	48.356	4	48.691	7	1:37.047	+1.273
5	10	Margita Sirsniņa	Latvia	48.739	7	48.379	3	1:37.118	+1.344
6	1	Amanda Ogorodņikova	Latvia	48.664	6	48.683	6	1:37.347	+1.573
7	3	Emilia Nosal	Poland	48.504	5	48.886	8	1:37.390	+1.616
8	11	Viktoria Gasser	Austria	48.878	8	48.525	4	1:37.403	+1.629
9	2	Kim So-yoon	South Korea	49.103	12	48.899	9	1:38.002	+2.228
10	28	Oliwia Dawidowska	Poland	49.006	10	49.235	13	1:38.241	+2.467
11	29	Maya Yuen	Canada	49.288	15	48.989	10	1:38.277	+2.503
12	30	Park Ji-ye	South Korea	49.194	13	49.176	11	1:38.370	+2.596
13	27	Kaia Hatton	Great Britain	49.312	16	49.215	12	1:38.527	+2.753
14	19	Xin Lihui	China	49.283	14	49.344	14	1:38.627	+2.853
15	9	Katharina Sofie Kofler	Italy	48.971	9	49.785	17	1:38.756	+2.982
16	15	Ana Cezara Teodorescu	Romania	49.626	18	49.538	15	1:39.164	+3.390
17	26	Daryna Fedorchuk	Ukraine	49.529	17	50.092	21	1:39.621	+3.847
18	8	Elizabeth Kleinheinz	United States	50.345	23	49.669	16	1:40.014	+4.240
19	31	Dariia Nekotienieva	Ukraine	49.983	20	50.166	22	1:40.149	+4.375
20	17	Johanna Kohala	Sweden	50.393	24	49.907	19	1:40.300	+4.526
21	16	Maggie Dowling	New Zealand	50.256	22	50.051	20	1:40.307	+4.533
22	20	Ionela Mădălina Dobrean	Romania	49.756	19	50.612	24	1:40.368	+4.594
23	4	Tai Wei-chen	Chinese Taipei	50.674	25	49.855	18	1:40.529	+4.755
24	13	Thiméa Ginet	France	50.253	21	50.364	23	1:40.617	+4.843
25	22	Viktória Praxová	Slovakia	50.757	26	51.837	28	1:42.594	+6.820
26	23	Sunita Chaiyapantho	Thailand	51.407	28	51.504	27	1:42.911	+7.137
27	21	Lily Cooke	Ireland	52.149	30	50.833	25	1:42.982	+7.208
28	24	Ava Lucia Huerta	Canada	51.087	27	51.998	30	1:43.085	+7.311
29	18	Desana Špitzová	Slovakia	52.008	29	51.207	26	1:43.215	+7.441
30	25	Isabela Aponte	Puerto Rico	53.328	31	51.854	29	1:45.182	+9.408
31	14	Talia Tonn	United States	49.064	11	Did not finish			
