= Roberts Plūme =

Latvian cyclist and skier (1897–1956)

Personal information
- Born: 16 May 1897 Jaunjelgava, Latvia
- Died: 25 August 1956 (aged 59) Toronto, Canada

Cycling career
- Sport: Cycling

Roberts Plūme (16 May 1897 – 25 August 1956) was a Latvian cyclist and cross-country skier. He competed as a cyclist at the 1924 and 1928 Summer Olympics and as a skier at the 1924 Winter Olympics.
