= Kelly Van Petegem =

Belgian bobsledder (born 1999)

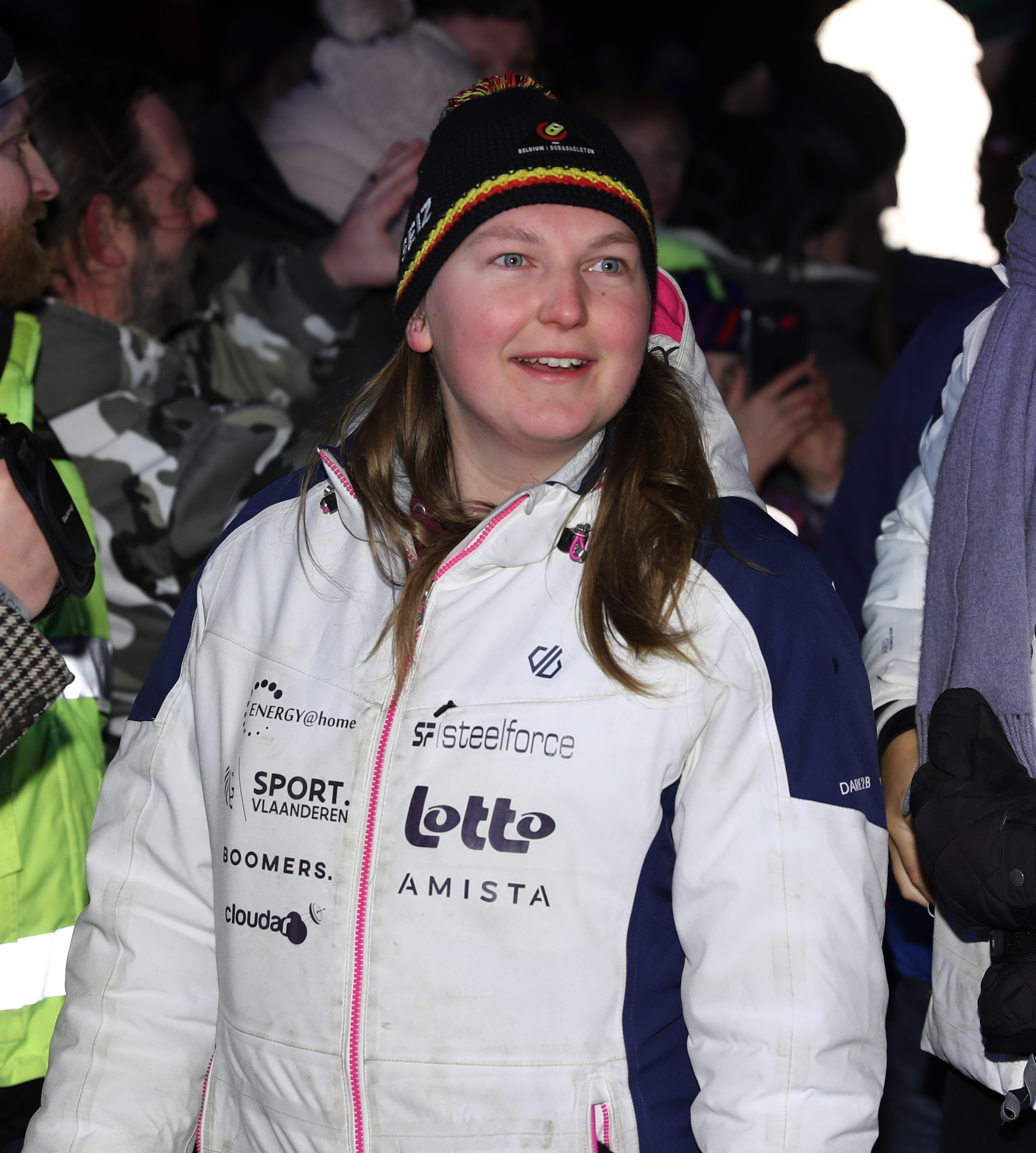
- Van Petegem at the IBSF World Championships 2020

Personal information
- Nationality: Belgian
- Born: 3 December 1999 (age 26) Wetteren, Belgium
- Height: 169 cm (5.54 ft)

Sport
- Country: Belgium
- Sport: Bobsleigh
- Events: Monobob, Two-woman
- Turned pro: 2019
Medal record
Women's bobsleigh
Representing Belgium
Junior European Championships
Silver medal – second place	2024 Altenberg	Monobob
Junior World Championships U23
Bronze medal – third place	2023 Winterberg	Two-woman
Junior European Championships U23
Silver medal – second place	2023 Winterberg	Monobob

Kelly Van Petegem (born 3 December 1999) is a Belgian bobsledder. She represented Belgium at the 2026 Winter Olympics.

== Career ==
Van Petegem initially competed in track and field events as a sprinter. She eventually transitioned to throwing events, such as javelin and shot put. At age 18, she participated in a bobsleigh test event in Oordegem, and was recruited to Belgium's bobsleigh team afterwards. She participated as a brakewoman in two-woman and as a pilot in monobob. At the 2022 Winter Olympics, she was a reserve brakewoman for the team of An Vannieuwenhuyse. When Vannieuwenhuyse retired after 2022, Van Petegem became a pilot in the two-woman. She found success in the IBSF's Europe Cup during the 2023–24 season, winning two events and taking multiple medals. Beginning with the 2024–25 season, she has competed primarily in the Bobsleigh World Cup.

Van Petegem qualified for the 2026 Winter Olympics, earning the last available spot in monobob with her performance at the World Cup event at Alternberg, despite her suffering from a hamstring injury. She did not qualify for two-woman, in part due to an error in which the team was accidentally entered in to a wrong event, forcing them to miss points at their intended race. In the Olympics, Van Petegem finished 19th.

== Personal life ==
Van Petegem studied Biochemistry Laboratory Techniques at Hogeschool Gent.

== Bobsleigh results ==
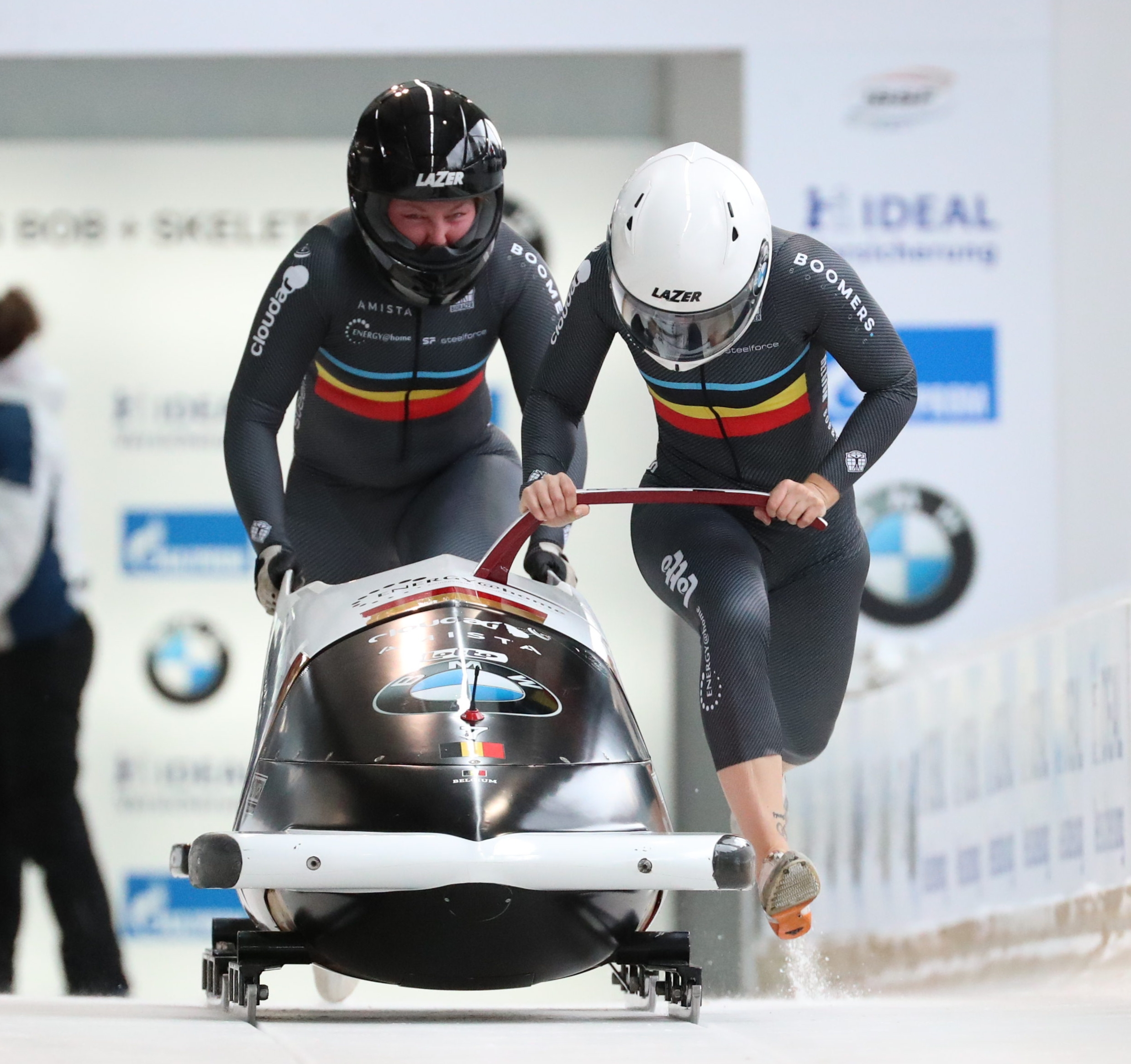
Van Petegem with pilot An Vannieuwenhuyse competing at the IBSF World Championships 2020.

All results are sourced from the International Bobsleigh and Skeleton Federation (IBSF).

=== Olympic Games ===
Event	Monobob
(Italy) 2026 Milano Cortina	19th

=== World Championships ===
Event	Monobob	Two-woman
(Germany) 2020 Altenberg	—	11th
(Germany) 2024 Winterberg	18th	18th
