= Antonia Pietschmann =

German luger (born 2006)

- Pietschmann in 2026

Personal information
- Nationality: German
- Born: 2 November 2006 (age 19) Ilmenau, Thuringia, Germany

Sport
- Sport: Luge
Medal record
Women's luge
Representing Germany
Winter Youth Olympics
Gold medal – first place	2024 Gangwon	Singles
Junior World Championships
Gold medal – first place	2024 Lillehammer	Singles
Bronze medal – third place	2025 St. Moritz	Singles

Antonia Pietschmann (born 2 November 2006) is a German luger.

== Career ==
In January 2024, she represented Germany at the 2024 Winter Youth Olympics and won a gold medal in the singles event with a time of 1:35.774. This was Germany's first gold medal of the 2024 Winter Youth Olympics. The next month she competed at the 2024 Junior World Luge Championships and won a gold medal in the singles event.

In February 2025, she competed at the 2025 Junior World Luge Championships and won a bronze medal in the singles event with a time of 1:51.280.
