= Goggausee =

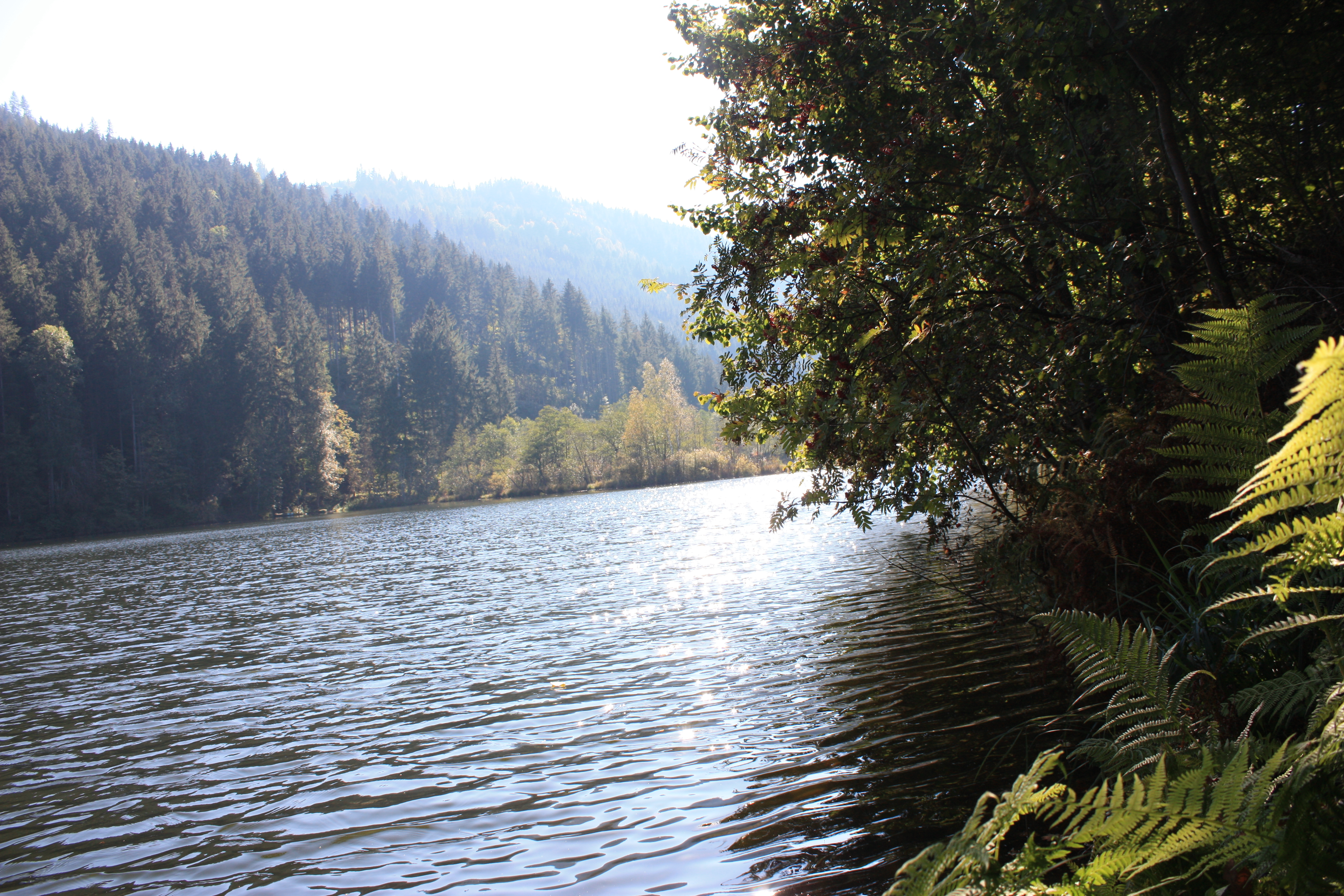

- Location within Austria
- Location: Carinthia, Austria
- Coordinates: 46°47′55″N 14°09′12″E
- Type: lake

Goggausee is a lake of Carinthia, Austria.The Goggausee lies in the area of the Gurktaler Alps, north of Feldkirchen in Carinthia, in a very windless pool. Due to the sheltered location, the water is not mixed well and is oxygen‐poor after a few metres.

The water quality is considered good despite partially low visibility. The small lake of elongated, rectangular shape is known in the region as a cooler bathing lake. The water has an outlet over a moor in the Wimitzbach. The area around the lake is sparsely populated, especially the almost deserted Wimitz Valley. The lake is located in the municipality of Steuerberg. The nearest towns Steuerberg and Rennweg are about 2 km away.

The lake is located in the 100-hectare conservation area Goggausee (LGBl. No. 80/1970).

== Fish in Goggausee ==
In Goggausee, the following 10 fish species can be found:

- Perch (Perca fluviatilis)
- Bream (Abramis brama)
- Pike (Esox lucius)
- Carp (Cyprinus carpio)
- Bleak (Alburnus alburnus)
- Roach (Rutilus rutilus)
- Rudd (Scardinius erythrophthalmus)
- Tench (Tinca tinca)
- Catfish (Silurus glanis)
- Zander (Sander lucioperca)

Catfish and perch thrive here, and are numerous. Goggausee also houses a dense population of crayfish (Astacus astacus).
