= Christian Röder =

German bobsledder

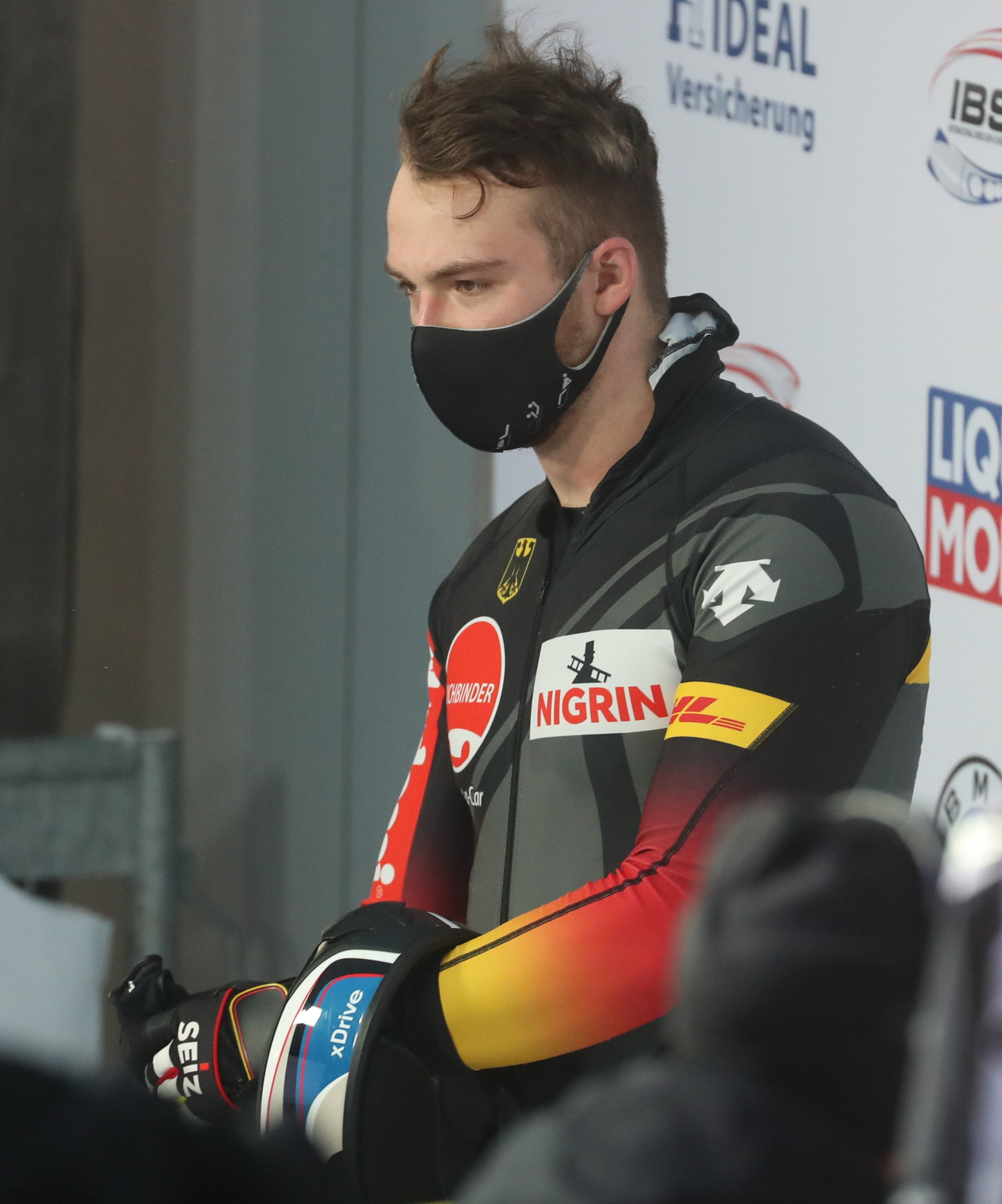
- Röder in 2021

Personal information
- Nationality: German
- Born: 23 January 1997 (age 29)
- Height: 1.85 m (6 ft 1 in)
- Weight: 94 kg (207 lb)

Sport
- Country: Germany
- Sport: Bobsleigh
- Event: Two-man
- Club: BRC Thüringen
Medal record
World Championships
Bronze medal – third place	2021 Alternberg	Two-man
Junior World Championships
Gold medal – first place	2021 St. Moritz	Two-man

Christian Röder (born 23 January 1997) is a German bobsledder.

He won a bronze medal at the IBSF World Championships 2021 in the two-man event.
