= Hans-Peter Hannighofer =

German bobsledder

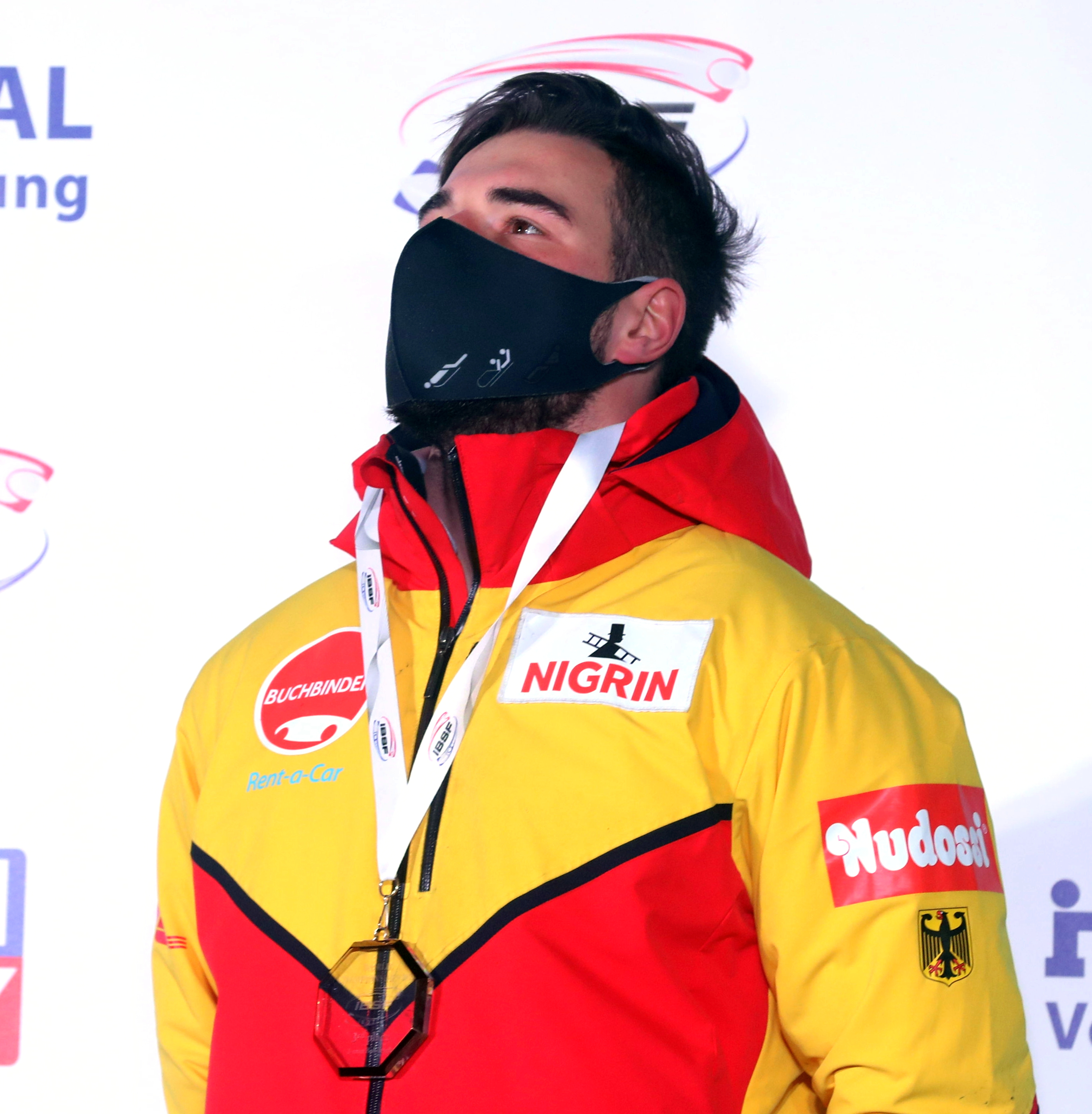
- Hannighofer in 2021

Personal information
- Nationality: German
- Born: 17 October 1997 (age 28)
- Height: 1.90 m (6 ft 3 in)
- Weight: 100 kg (220 lb)

Sport
- Country: Germany
- Sport: Bobsleigh
- Event: Two-man
- Club: BRC Thüringen
Medal record
World Championships
Bronze medal – third place	2021 Alternberg	Two-man
Junior World Championships
Gold medal – first place	2021 St. Moritz	Two-man

Hans-Peter Hannighofer (born 17 October 1997) is a German bobsledder.

He won a bronze medal at the IBSF World Championships 2021 in the two-man event.
