= Alex Klein (athlete) =

Canadian athlete and basketball player

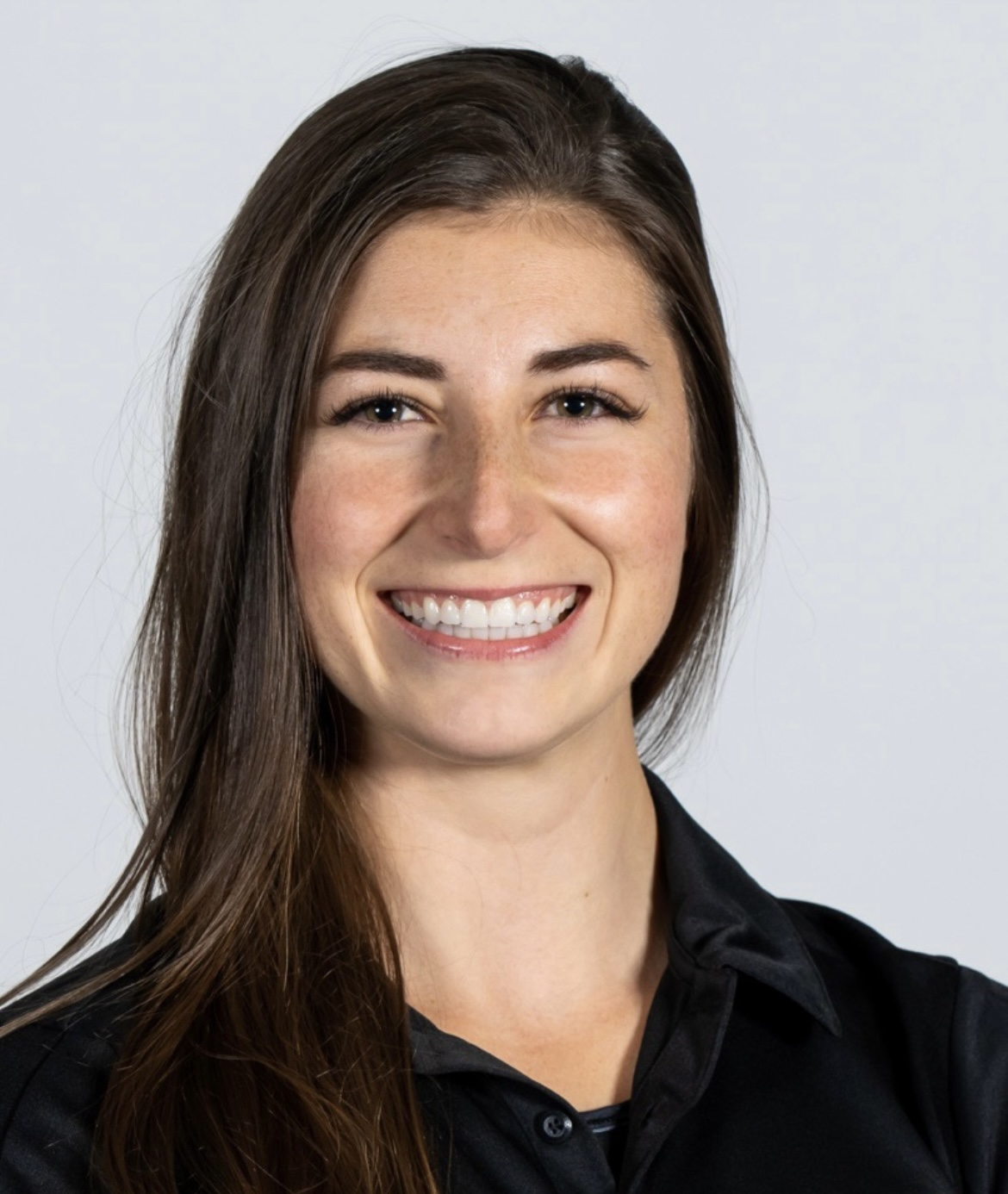

Personal information
- Born: December 6, 1994 (age 30) Kitchener, Ontario, Canada
- Education: Business degree, Bryant University
- Occupation(s): Athlete, Entrepreneur
- Height: 6 ft 1 in (185 cm)
- Website: groupofgrit.com

Sport
- Sport: Basketball, Bobsleigh
- Team: Europe Basketball League, National Bobsleigh Team

Alexandra Mary Klein (born December 6, 1994) is a Canadian professional athlete, and former professional basketball player who later transitioned to bobsleigh.

== Early life and education ==
Klein was born in Kitchener, Ontario. She attended St. John's Kilmarnock School (grades 1–9), later transferring to Waterloo Collegiate Institute to finish her high school education and athletic pursuits. Klein excelled as a four-sport athlete. She later pursued a business degree in marketing at Bryant University in Rhode Island on a full athletic scholarship. A standout basketball player, she graduated in 2017 with accolades including Female Athlete of the Year and First Team All-Conference honors.

== Career ==
Klein's basketball career in Europe was cut short after she was diagnosed with ulcerative colitis.

In 2020, Klein met an individual affiliated with Bobsleigh Canada Skeleton, who suggested she try the sport. After initially dismissing the idea, she eventually sought training from Joey Nemet, a former World Cup bobsleigh competitor. Klein successfully passed the national testing camp in 2022, earning her place on the team.

That same year, Klein re-trained her body to meet the demands of bobsleigh and attended her first National Testing Camp for Team Canada.

Paired with veteran pilot Melissa Lotholz, Klein achieved notable success during the 2023–24 North American Cup season, including multiple podium finishes and securing the 2-woman North American Cup title.

In 2024, she began training with Olaf Hampel.
