= Viktória Čerňanská =

Slovak bobsledder (born 2002)

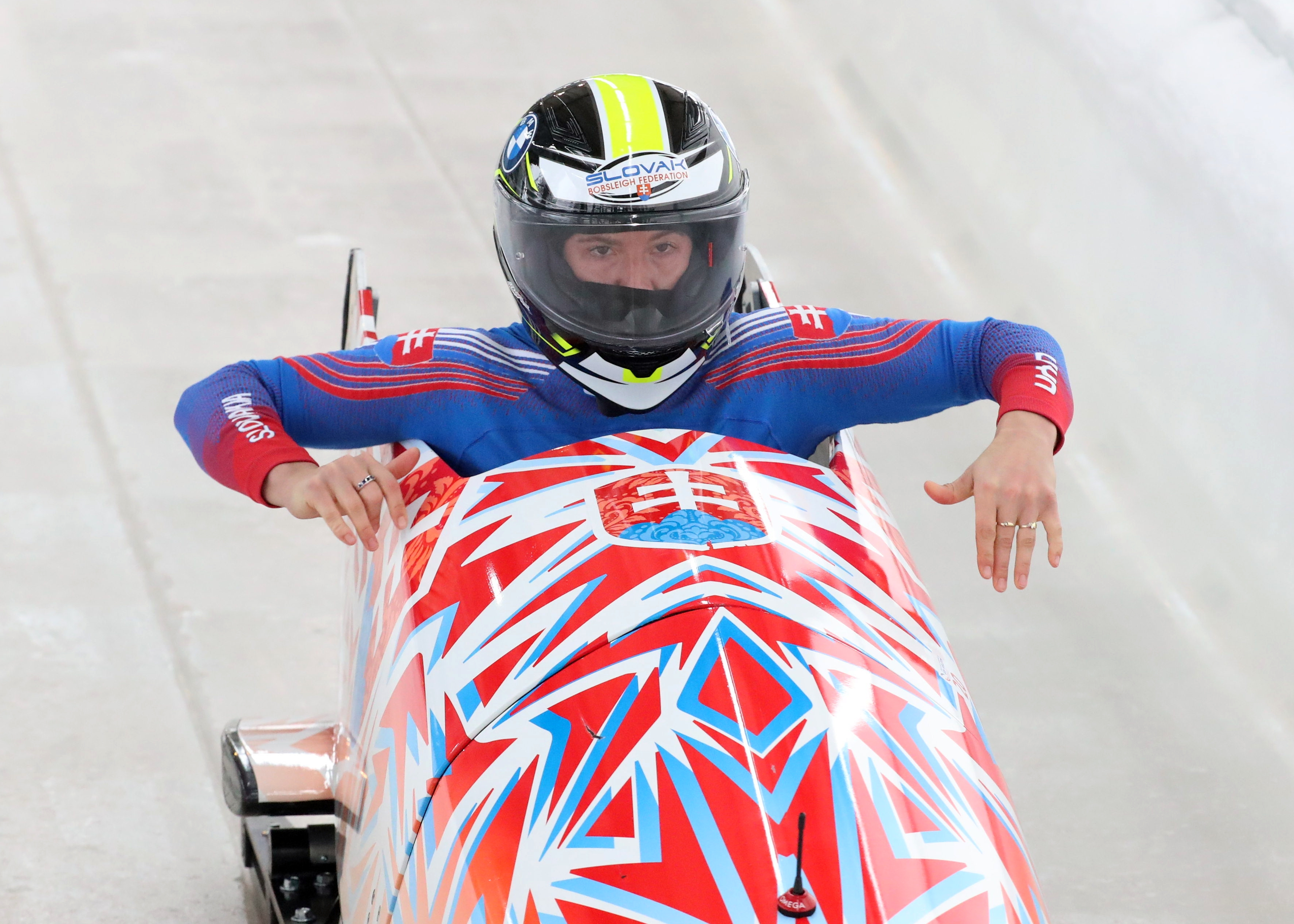
- Čerňanská in 2021

Personal information
- Born: 29 March 2002 (age 24) Bratislava, Slovakia

Sport
- Country: Slovakia
- Sport: Bobsleigh
Medal record
Women's bobsleigh
Representing Slovakia
IBSF Junior World Championships
Gold medal – first place	2022 Innsbruck	Monobob (U23)
Silver medal – second place	2022 Innsbruck	Two-woman (U23)
Bronze medal – third place	2021 St. Moritz	Two-woman (U23)
Youth Olympic Games
Silver medal – second place	2020 Lausanne	Monobob

Viktória Čerňanská (born 29 March 2002) is a Slovak bobsledder who competed at the 2022 and 2026 Winter Olympics.

== Early life ==
Čerňanská was involved in sports as a child when her coach pushed her to try bobsleigh. She immediately became interested in this sport and began to devote herself to it. Čerňanská completed demanding trainings year-round outside her homeland.

== Career ==
Čerňanská represented Slovakia at the 2020 Winter Youth Olympics in the monobob event and won a silver medal.

Čerňanská competed at the 2022 IBSF Junior World Championships where she won a gold medal in the U23 monobob, and a silver medal in the two-woman event.

Čerňanská represented Slovakia at the 2022 Winter Olympics in the monobob event. She finished second place at the 2023–24 Bobsleigh World Cup in Whistler, Canada, behind Melissa Lotholz from said country. Čerňanská finished 21st place during the women's monobob event at the IBSF World Championships 2024 in Winterberg, Germany, her lowest position to date.
