= Rimsting station =

Railway station in Rimsting, Germany

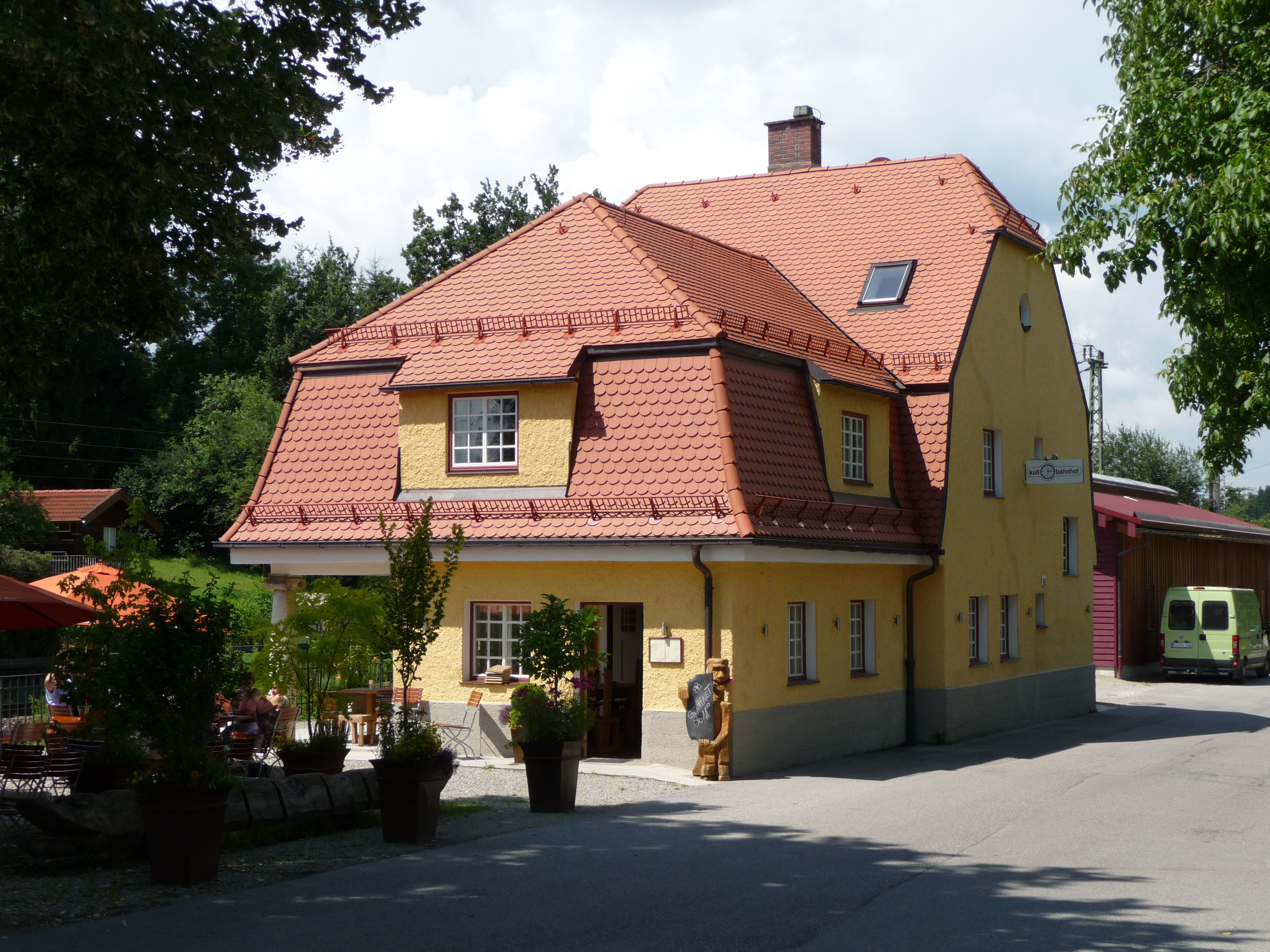
- Cultural centre at the old Rimsting station

General information
- Location: Rimsting, Bavaria; Germany
- Coordinates: 47°53′32″N 12°20′38″E
- System: Through station
- Lines: Rosenheim–Salzburg (KBS 951)

Other information
- Station code: n/a
- DS100 code: MRG

History
- Opened: 1881
Location
- Location within Bavaria

Rimsting station is a former railway station in the Upper Bavarian district of Rimsting on the Rosenheim–Salzburg railway in southern Germany. The first halt was installed in 1881 for the Bavarian King Ludwig II, who wanted to visit the construction site for his next palace, Schloss Herrenchiemsee. The present-day station building was erected in 1911. In 1981 the station was closed to passenger services; a siding is still in use for the delivery of liquid gas.

Since 2006 a cultural meeting place has been housed in the station building.

== Location ==
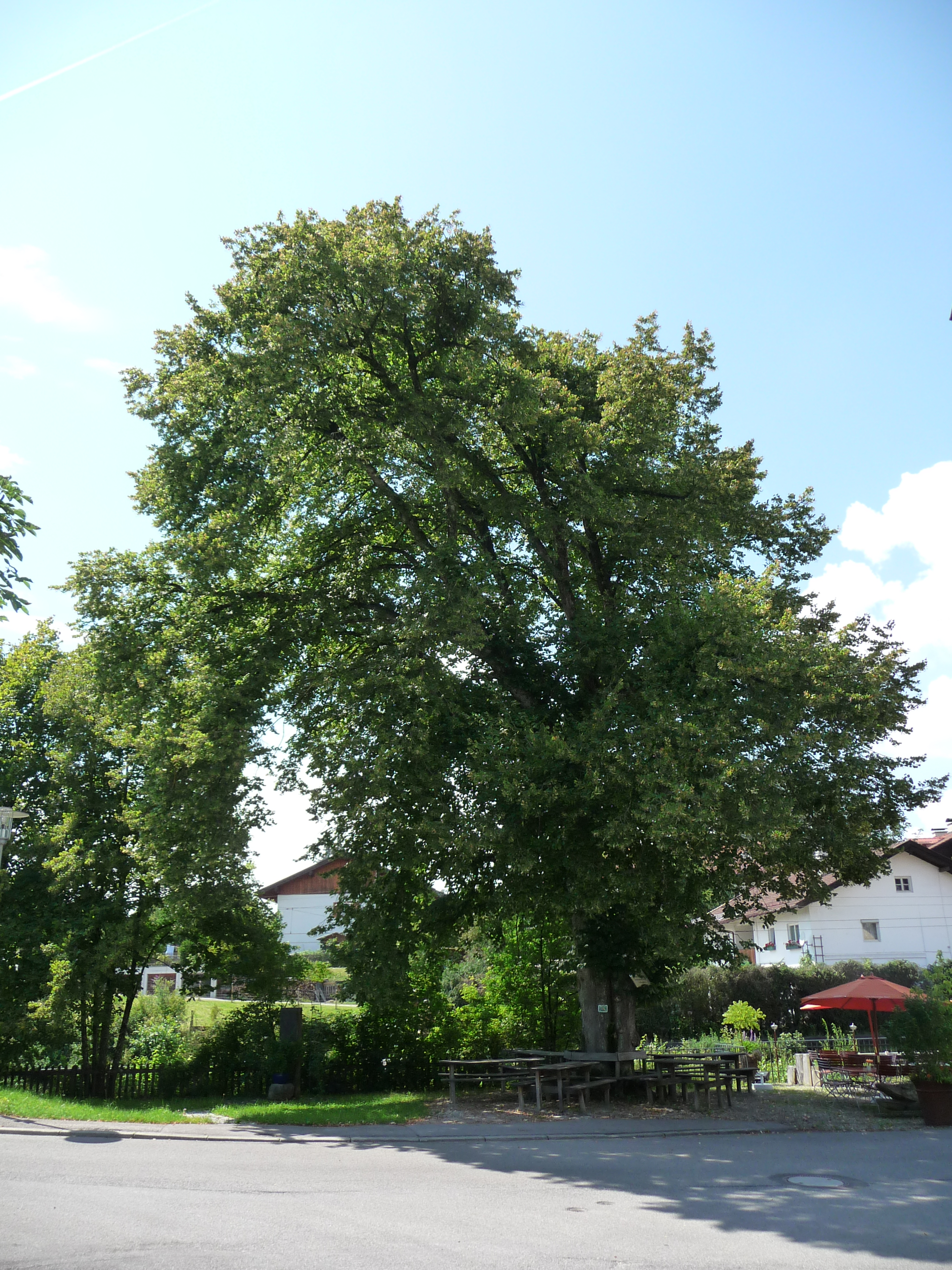
Rimsting station: the King's lime tree

The station was built at kilometre marker 85.5 on the Munich–Salzburg line, which passes Rimsting to the east and whose trackway splits the village from the west bank of the Chiemsee. The perimeter location was planned by the town and opened up the neighbouring communities of Breitbrunn, Gstadt, Eggstätt and Hemhof via linking roads, which for a long time were the only means of public transport. From the station, tracks lead to the peninsula of Urfahrn and the so-called Rimstiger Überfahrt (Rimsting crossing) to the islands of Fraueninsel and Herreninsel.
