= Simssee =

Lake in Bavaria

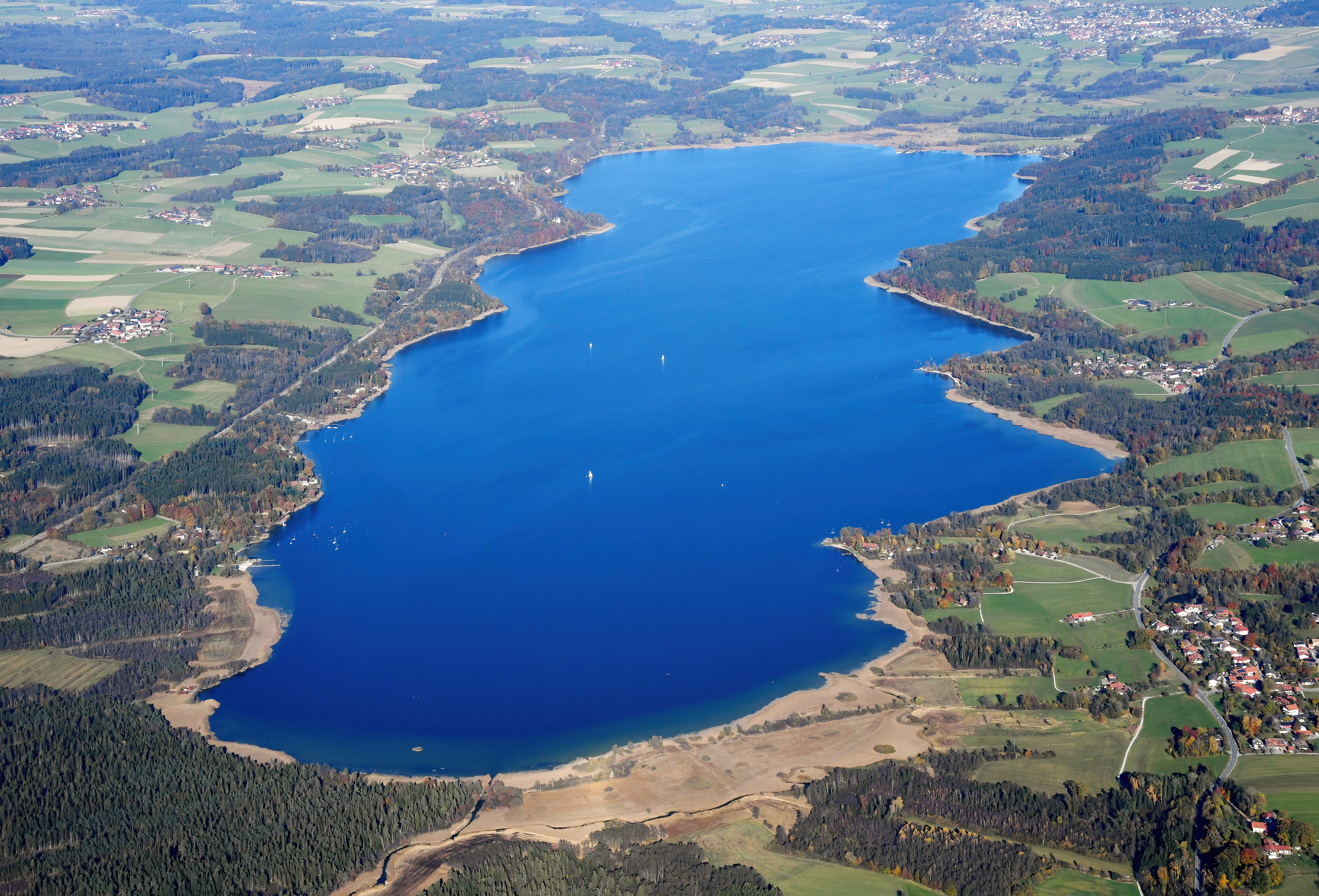

- Location within Bavaria
- Location: Alpine foothills, Bavaria
- Coordinates: 47°52′22″N 12°14′22″E
- Primary inflows: Thalkirchner Achen, Antworter Achen, Weidmoos-Graben
- Primary outflows: Sims
- Basin countries: Germany
- Surface area: 6.5 km^{2} (2.5 sq mi)
- Average depth: 13.41 m (44.0 ft)
- Max. depth: 22 m (72 ft)
- Water volume: 8,700,000 m^{3} (310,000,000 cu ft)
- Shore length^{1}: 14 km (8.7 mi)
- Surface elevation: 470.1 m (1,542 ft)
- Islands: 0
- ^{1} Shore length is not a well-defined measure.

Simssee is a lake in the Alpine foothills of Bavaria, Germany. It has an elevation of 470.1 metres and a surface area of 6.5 km^{2,} making it the largest lake in the Rosenheim district. The maximum depth of the lake is 22.5 m. It drains into the river Sims. The retention period of the Simssee is about one and a half years and its catchment area covers 59.51 km^{2}. It is the last remain of Lake Rosenheim, which stretched over the area at the end of the Würm glaciation. The lake is a popular recreational spot for local visitors.

The lake is part of the following municipalities:

- Bad Endorf
- Stephanskirchen
- Riedering
- Prutting
- Söchtenau

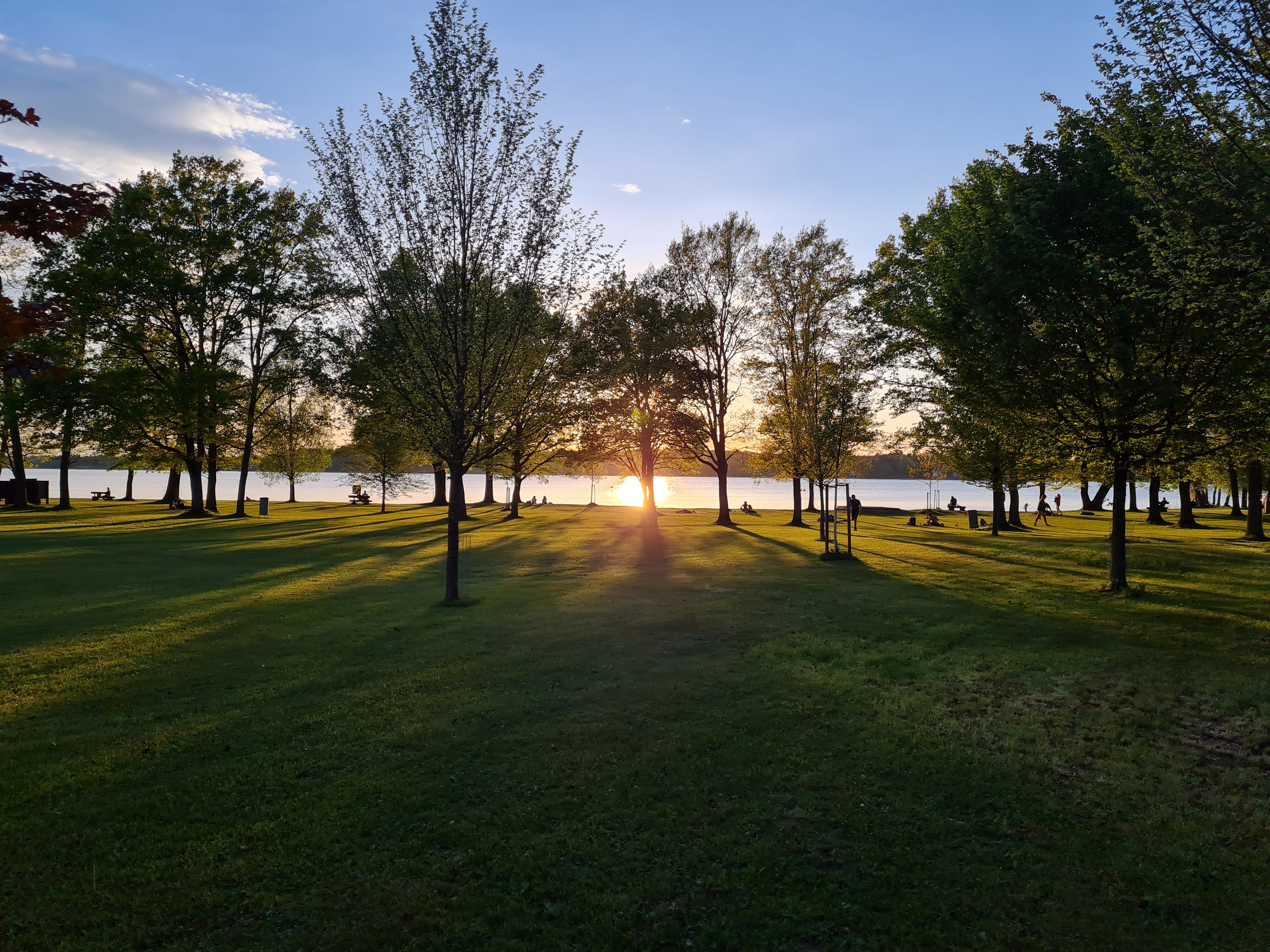
Sunset at Simssee

== See also ==
- List of lakes in Bavaria
