= Sims (river) =

River in Germany

Coordinates: 47°51′N 12°13′E

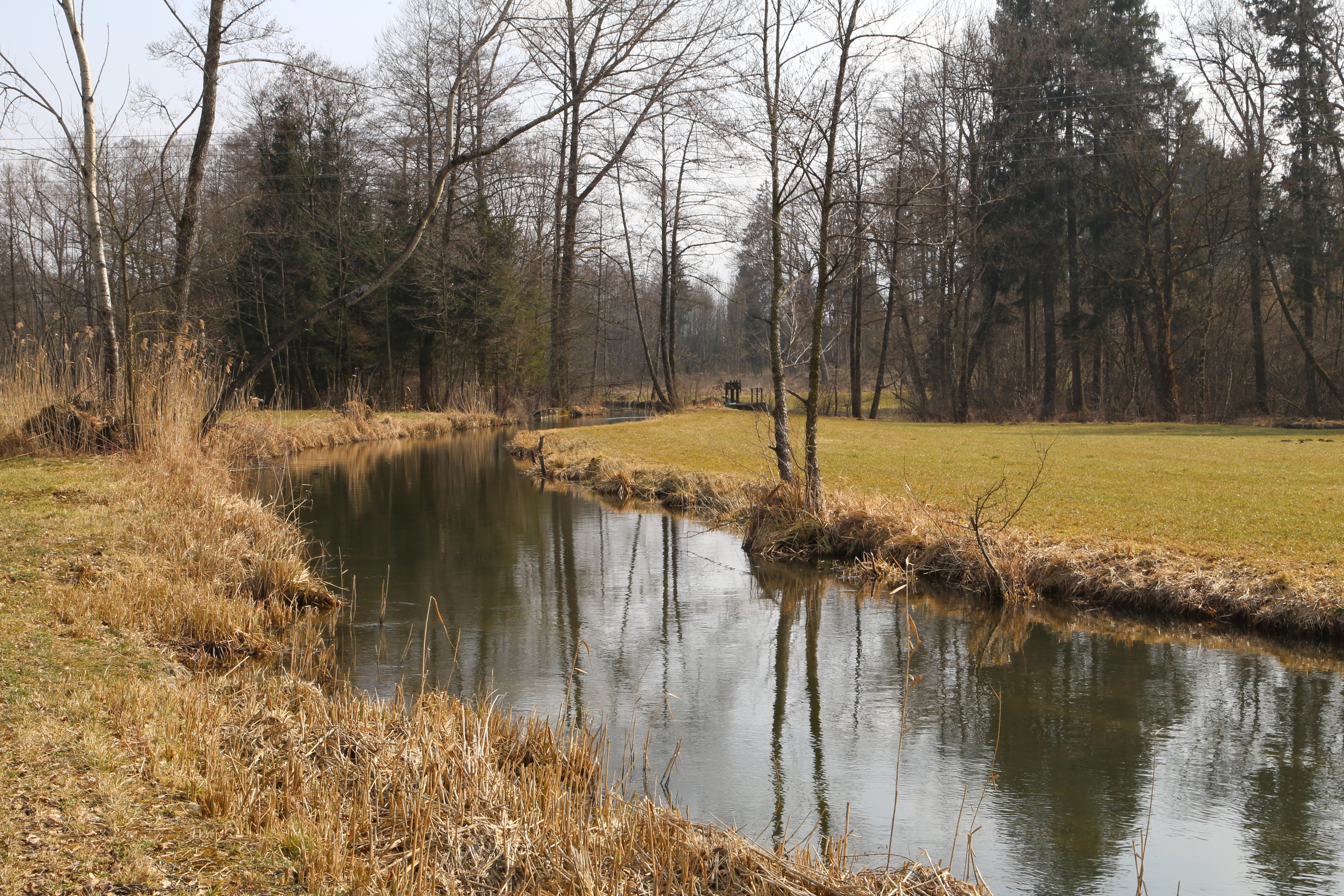
- The Sims near Krottenhausmühle, Stephanskirchen

- Location within Bavaria

Location
- Country: Germany
- State: Bavaria

Physical characteristics
- Source
  - location: Simssee
  - elevation: 470 m (1,540 ft)
- Mouth
  - location: into the Rohrdorfer Achen near Rosenheim
  - elevation: 443 m (1,453 ft)
- Length: 6 km (3.7 mi)
- Basin size: 97 km^{2} (37 sq mi)

Basin features
- Progression: Rohrdorfer Achen→ Inn→ Danube→ Black Sea

The Sims is a river of Bavaria, Germany, near the country's southern border. A right tributary of the Inn, the Sims is approximately eight kilometers long, and is fed by the Simssee, a small lake. It flows into the Rohrdorfer Achen, close to its confluence with the Inn, near Rosenheim in the municipality of Stephanskirchen. Initially, it runs along the edge of the municipal area from Stephanskirchen to that of Riedering.

== Geography ==
=== Course ===
At its southern end, the Sims flows out of the Simssee to the north of Riedering at 470 m above sea level and immediately heads west through the wet Achalterwiesen meadows in the nature reserve on the southern shore of the Simssee. Here it picks up a second short outflow of the lake from the right, runs a good distance through the nature reserve and then touches the district of Eitzing on its southern edge at the mill Krottenhausmühle. Further downstream, it runs through the Kohlhaufmühle and Pulvermühle mill sites before entering the forest area around the Lauterbacher Filze, where it picks up the Röthbach flowing in from Riedering-Niedermoosen in the south and then loops around another Pulvermühle mill of Stephanskirchen. In the adjoining Röthbachholz, its longest mill channel branches off to the right to the Landlmühle mill, which it then picks up again after crossing under the railroad line from Rohrdorf to Landl in the industrial area south of Landl. After the small river has also crossed under the street Miesbacher Straße (St 2095) and passed through Murnau, it joins the Rohrdorfer Achen, which runs parallel to the Inn, on its western edge to the wedge-shaped alluvial forest along the Inn, and which joins the Inn from the right just 300 meters further on.

=== Tributaries ===
From Lake Simssee, from the upper end of the lake in the northeast to the southwest to the outlet of the Sims:

- Antworter Achen, from the east in the Seemoos near Söchtenau-Eichen on the Simssee
- Thalkirchner Achen, from the south in the Seemoos near Bad Endorf-Thalkirchen
- Labenbach, from the southeast near Riedering-Moosen
- Fellbach, from the southeast near Riedering-Pietzing
- Angerbach, Bavaria, from the southeast near Riedering-Beuerberg

From the ledge at the origin of the lake to the mouth:

- Neue Achen, from the right and northeast from the Simssee. Another short drainage.
- Schlierbach, from the left and southeast north of Riedering
- Rothbach (!), from the left and south north of Riedering
- Großer Filsgraben, from the right and north
- Kleines Wasser, from the left and southeast at the Kohlhaufmühle into left branch there
- Röthbach (!), from the left and south west of Riedering

== See also ==
- List of rivers of Bavaria
