= Edling (disambiguation) =

Edling is an obsolete Welsh title. Edling may also refer to:

- Edling, Germany, a village
- Edling, a commune in the Moselle department in northeastern France
- Edling (surname)
