= Marc O'Polo =

Swedish-German fashion label

Marc O'Polo SE
- Company type: Aktiengesellschaft (AG)
- Industry: Apparel; Accessories
- Founded: 1967 in Stockholm, Sweden
- Founders: Rolf Lind, Göte Huss, Jerry O.Sheets
- Headquarters: Stephanskirchen, Bavaria, Germany
- Number of locations: 2,727 (2014)
- Key people: Werner Böck (chairman); Dieter Holzer (CEO); Maximilian Böck (Co-CEO); Markus Staude-Skowronek (CFO)
- Products: Clothing, shoes, bags, small leather goods, eyewear, home furnishings, underwear, beachwear
- Revenue: €472 million (2018/2019)
- Number of employees: 1,899 (2014)
- Website: www.marc-o-polo.com

Marc O’Polo is a Swedish-German fashion label founded in 1967 by Rolf Lind, Göte Huss and Jerry O'Sheets.

== History ==
=== Founding ===
Marc O’Polo was founded in Stockholm in 1967 by Rolf Lind, Göte Huss, and Jerry O'Sheets.

In 1972, the label introduced logo-imprinted cotton t-shirts, and launched a unisex sweatshirt. The first Marc O’Polo store opened in Düsseldorf in 1979.

=== Expansion ===
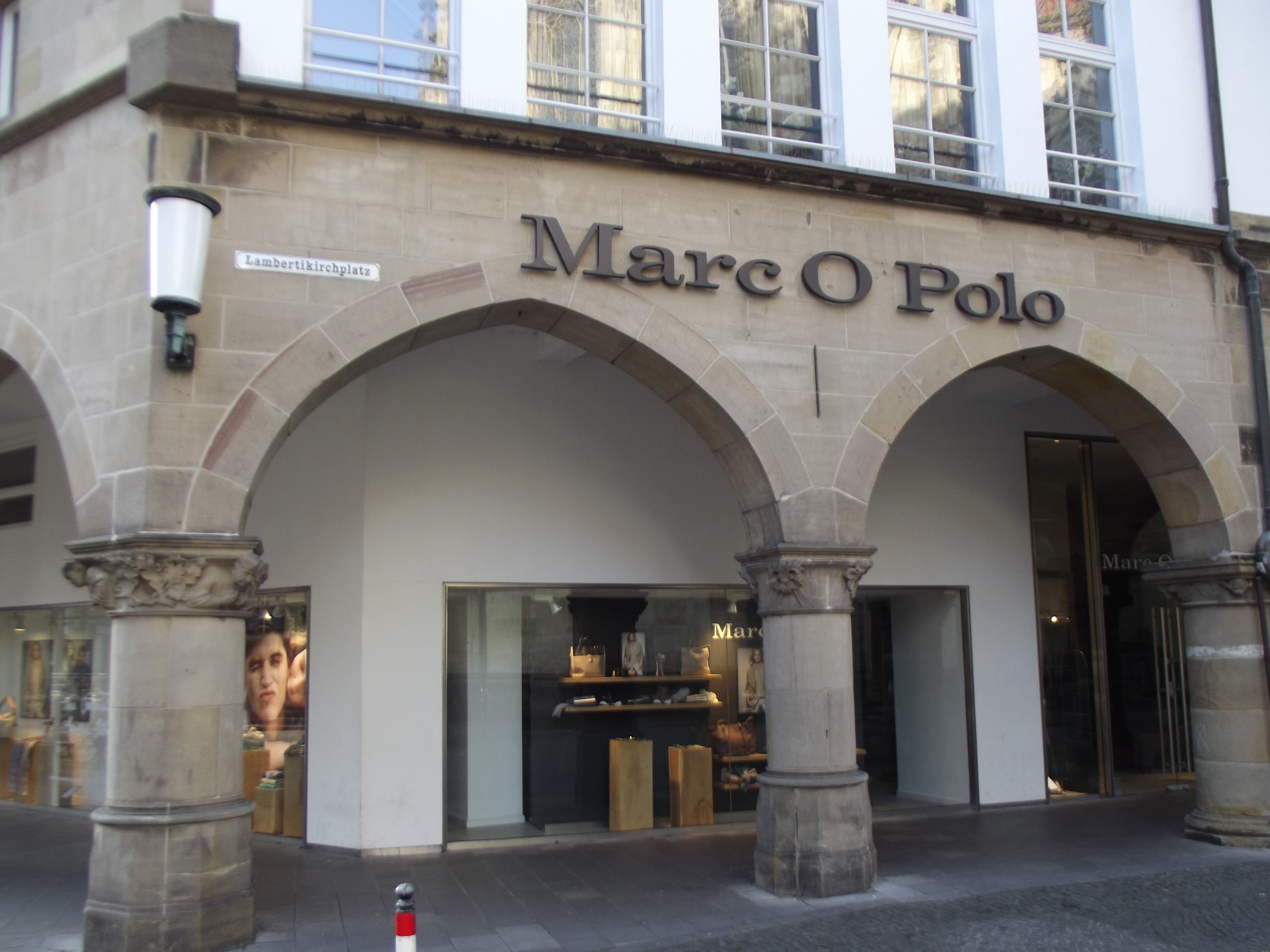
Marc O'Polo store, Münster, Germany

In 1997, the company's original distribution partner for Germany, Werner Böck, expanded his shareholdings founding Marc O’Polo International GmbH, which is responsible for all the company operations including design, production, distribution and marketing. On the same year Marc O’Polo relocated its headquarters from Stockholm to Stephanskirchen in the district of Rosenheim.

From 1997 Marc O’Polo began to produce bags and small leather goods, the next year in 1998 they launched beachwear and children's clothing. In 2003, a flagship Marc O’Polo store opened in Munich's Theatinerstraße and simultaneously opened an online store.

Since 2008, with the opening of the first Marc O’Polo store in Asia (in Singapore's Changi Airport), the company has invested in international expansion. The first Marc O’Polo stores in China opened in 2014.

== Ethical sourcing ==
In 2025, Marc O'Polo signed a brand letter of intent calling on the Australian wool industry to end the practice of mulesing.

== Partnerships ==
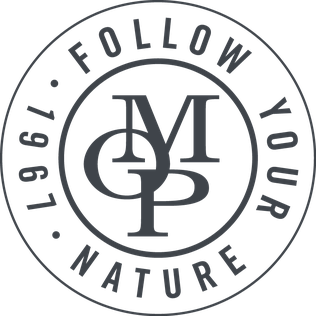
'Follow your Nature'

In 2013, Marc O’Polo introduced a new claim, ‘Follow your Nature,’ and began featuring celebrities in its campaigns. The actor Jeff Bridges was featured in campaigns for the company's menswear collections. In 2013 and Spring 2014, the campaign introduced Amber Valletta, followed by Uma Thurman in Fall/Winter 2014 in campaigns photographed by Mario Sorrenti.

For the Fall/Winter 2013 and Spring/Summer 2014 seasons, Marc O’Polo co-created collections with the fashion illustrator Garance Doré, and for the Fall/Winter 2014 season with the graffiti artist André Saraiva.

Since 2011, the company has sponsored the Marc O’Polo Design Award which honors innovative approaches to design among the students of Beckmans College of Design in Stockholm, Sweden.

Marc O'Polo has also supported specific creative ventures by a range of international artists, such as the 2013 publication of a bilingual (German-English) edition of photographer Werner Eisele's chronicle of auto racing in the '60s and '70s, Formula 1 Legends; floral artist Thierry Boutemy's installation ‘A Piece of Art’ exhibited in the Marc O'Polo store in Brussels during the 2014 Art Brussels contemporary art fair; the 2014 photo::vienna exhibition of contemporary Austrian photography at Vienna’s Museum of Applied Arts (MAK); and artist Stefan Gbureck's 2014 motorcycle ride from Berlin to Rio de Janeiro.
