= Griesstätt =

- Municipality
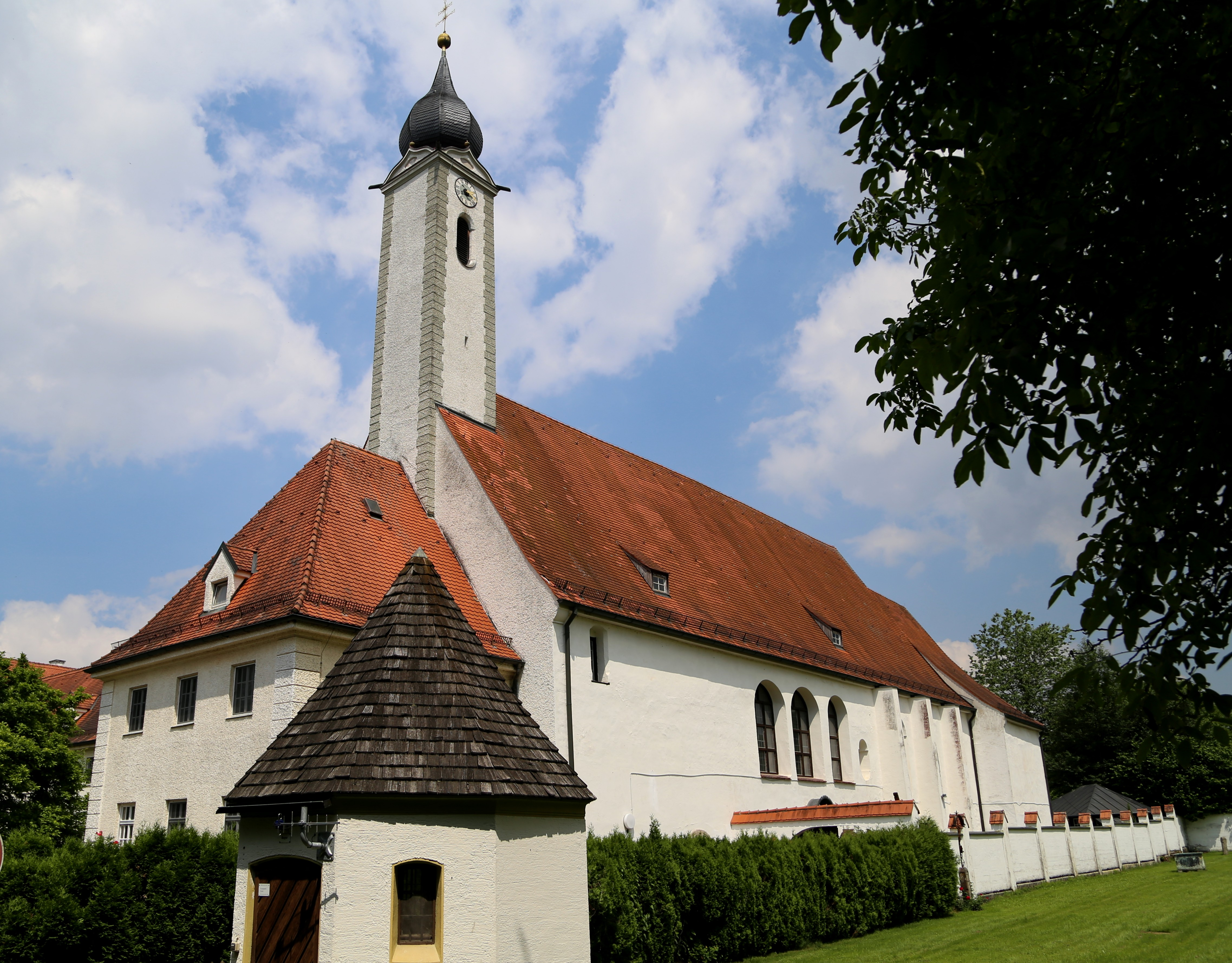
- Church of Saints Peter and Paul at Altenhohenau Abbey

- Coat of arms

- Location of Griesstätt within Rosenheim district
- Interactive map of Griesstätt
- Location within Germany Location within Bavaria
- Coordinates: 48°0′N 12°11′E
- Country: Germany
- State: Bavaria
- Admin. region: Oberbayern
- District: Rosenheim

Government
  - Mayor (2020–26): Robert Aßmus

Area
  - Total: 29.53 km^{2} (11.40 sq mi)
- Elevation: 492 m (1,614 ft)

Population (2025-12-31)
  - Total: 2,758
  - Density: 93.40/km^{2} (241.9/sq mi)
- Time zone: UTC+01:00 (CET)
  - Summer (DST): UTC+02:00 (CEST)
- Postal codes: 83556
- Dialling codes: 08039
- Vehicle registration: RO
- Website: www.griesstaett.de

Griesstätt (German pronunciation: [ˈɡʁiːsʃtɛt]; Central Bavarian: Griasstätt) is a municipality in the district of Rosenheim in Bavaria, Germany. It lies on the river Inn.
