= Breitbrunn am Chiemsee (Verwaltungsgemeinschaft) =

- Verwaltungsgemeinschaft
- Location of Breitbrunn am Chiemsee within Rosenheim district
- Interactive map of Breitbrunn am Chiemsee
- Location within Germany Location within Bavaria
- Coordinates: 47°54′N 12°24′E
- Country: Germany
- State: Bavaria
- Admin. region: Upper Bavaria
- District: Rosenheim
- Seat: Breitbrunn am Chiemsee
- Subdivisions: 3 municipalities

Area
  - Total: 21.39 km^{2} (8.26 sq mi)

Population (2025-12-31)
  - Total: 2,721
  - Density: 127.2/km^{2} (329.5/sq mi)
- Time zone: UTC+01:00 (CET)
  - Summer (DST): UTC+02:00 (CEST)
- Website: www.vg-breitbrunn.de

Breitbrunn am Chiemsee is a Verwaltungsgemeinschaft (municipal association) in the district of Rosenheim in Bavaria, Germany. Its seat is in Breitbrunn am Chiemsee.

It consists of the following municipalities:

1. Breitbrunn am Chiemsee
2. Chiemsee
3. Gstadt am Chiemsee
