= Rimsting =

- Municipality
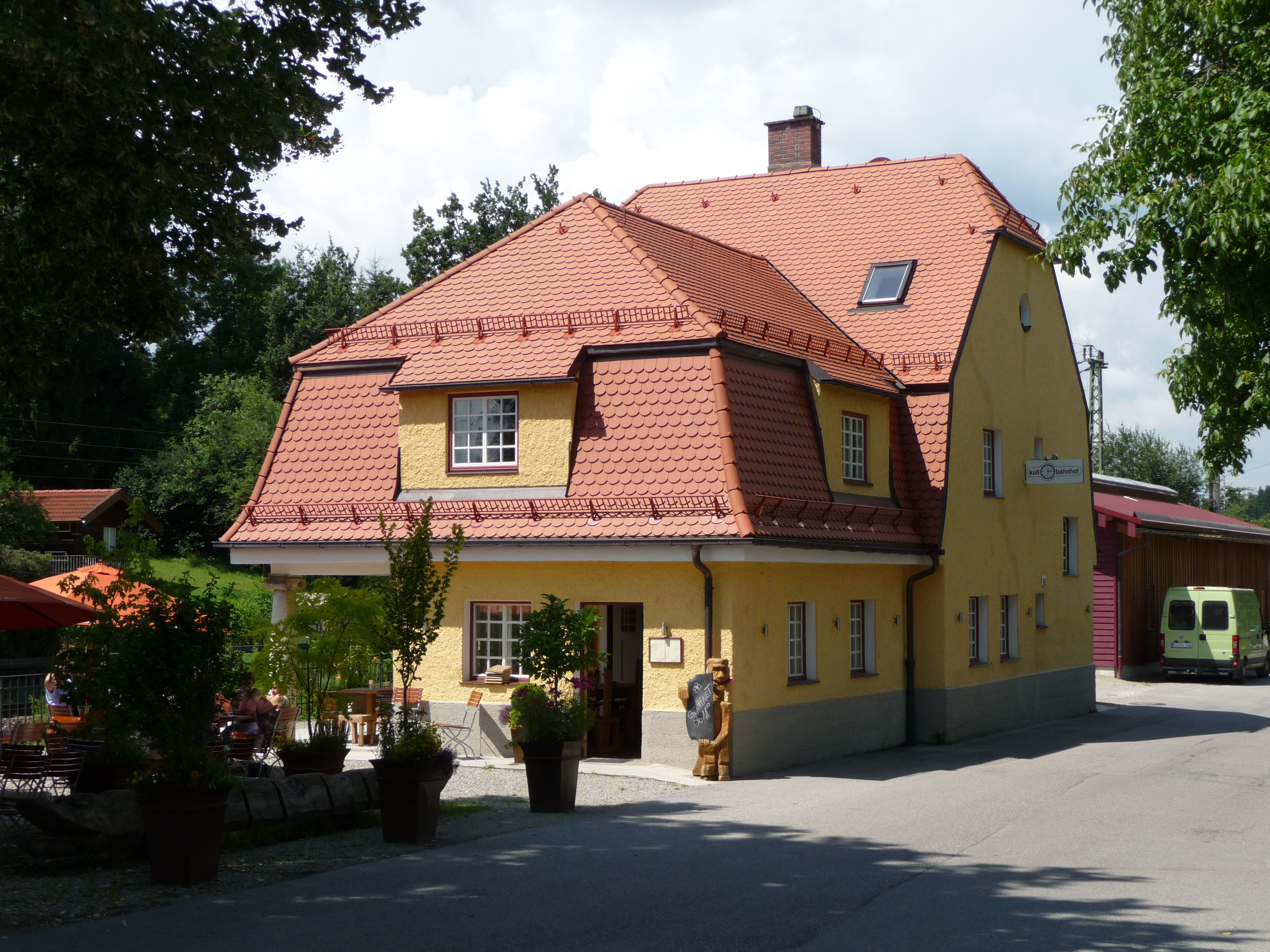
- Train station

- Coat of arms

- Location of Rimsting within Rosenheim district
- Interactive map of Rimsting
- Location within Germany Location within Bavaria
- Coordinates: 47°53′N 12°20′E
- Country: Germany
- State: Bavaria
- Admin. region: Oberbayern
- District: Rosenheim

Government
  - Mayor (2020–26): Andreas Fenzl (CSU)

Area
  - Total: 20 km^{2} (7.7 sq mi)
- Elevation: 518–699 m (1,699–2,293 ft)

Population (2025-12-31)
  - Total: 3,756
  - Density: 190/km^{2} (490/sq mi)
- Time zone: UTC+01:00 (CET)
  - Summer (DST): UTC+02:00 (CEST)
- Postal codes: 83253
- Dialling codes: 08051
- Vehicle registration: RO
- Website: www.rimsting.de

Rimsting (German pronunciation: [ˈʁɪmstɪŋ]) is a municipality in the district of Rosenheim in Bavaria in Germany. It lies on the shore of Lake Chiemsee between the municipalities of Prien am Chiemsee and Bad Endorf.
