= Stephanskirchen =

- Municipality
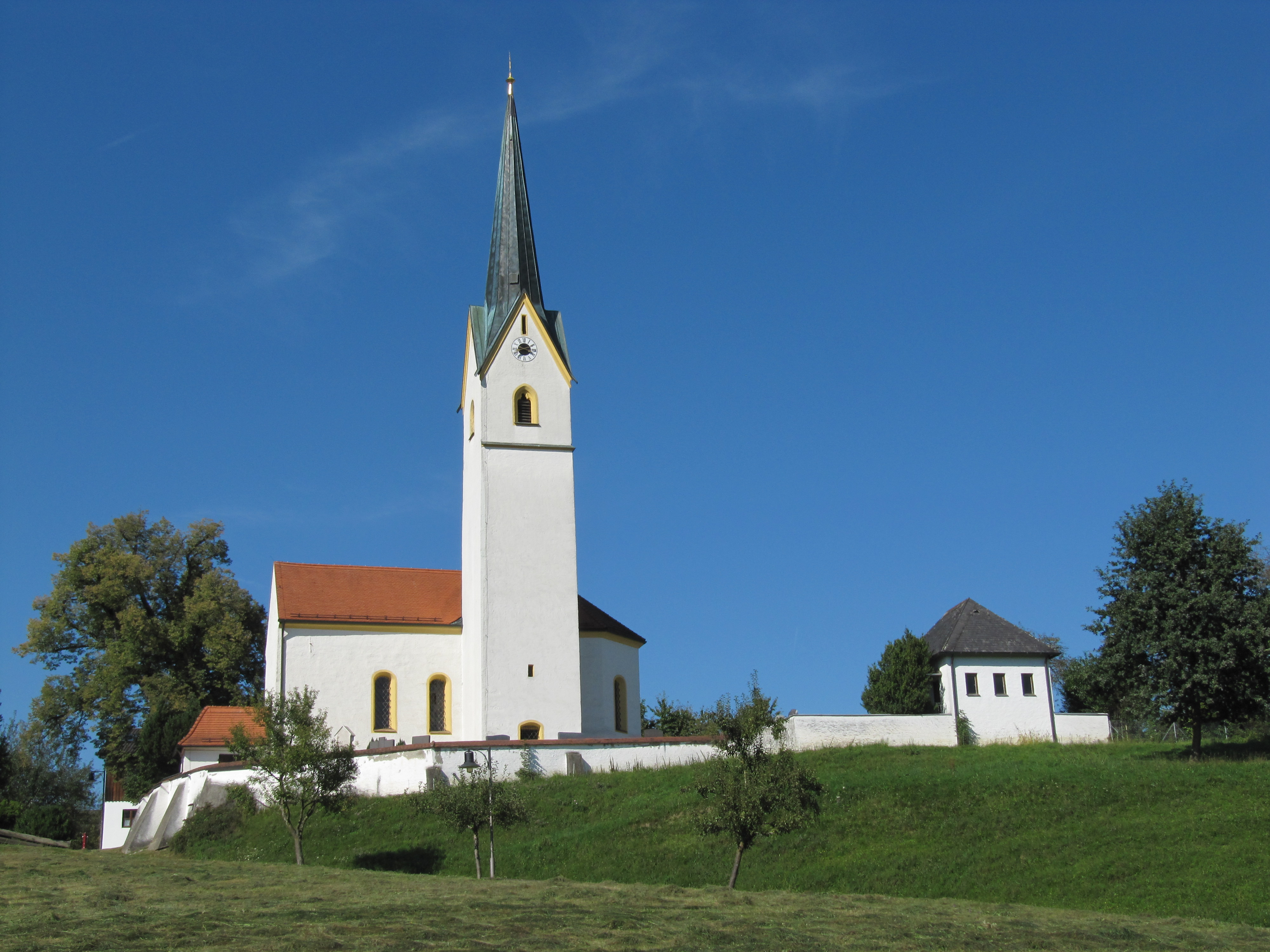
- Pilgrimage Church of Saint Leonhard

- Coat of arms

- Location of Stephanskirchen within Rosenheim district
- Interactive map of Stephanskirchen
- Location within Germany Location within Bavaria
- Coordinates: 47°51′N 12°11′E
- Country: Germany
- State: Bavaria
- Admin. region: Oberbayern
- District: Rosenheim

Government
  - Mayor (2020–26): Karl Mair

Area
  - Total: 26.51 km^{2} (10.24 sq mi)
- Elevation: 476–502 m (1,562–1,647 ft)

Population (2025-12-31)
  - Total: 10,695
  - Density: 403.4/km^{2} (1,045/sq mi)
- Time zone: UTC+01:00 (CET)
  - Summer (DST): UTC+02:00 (CEST)
- Postal codes: 83071
- Dialling codes: 08031, 08036
- Vehicle registration: RO
- Website: www.stephanskirchen.de

Stephanskirchen (German pronunciation: [ʃtɛfansˈkɪʁçn̩]; Central Bavarian: Steffeskirch) is a municipality in the district of Rosenheim, Upper Bavaria in Germany.

== Geography ==
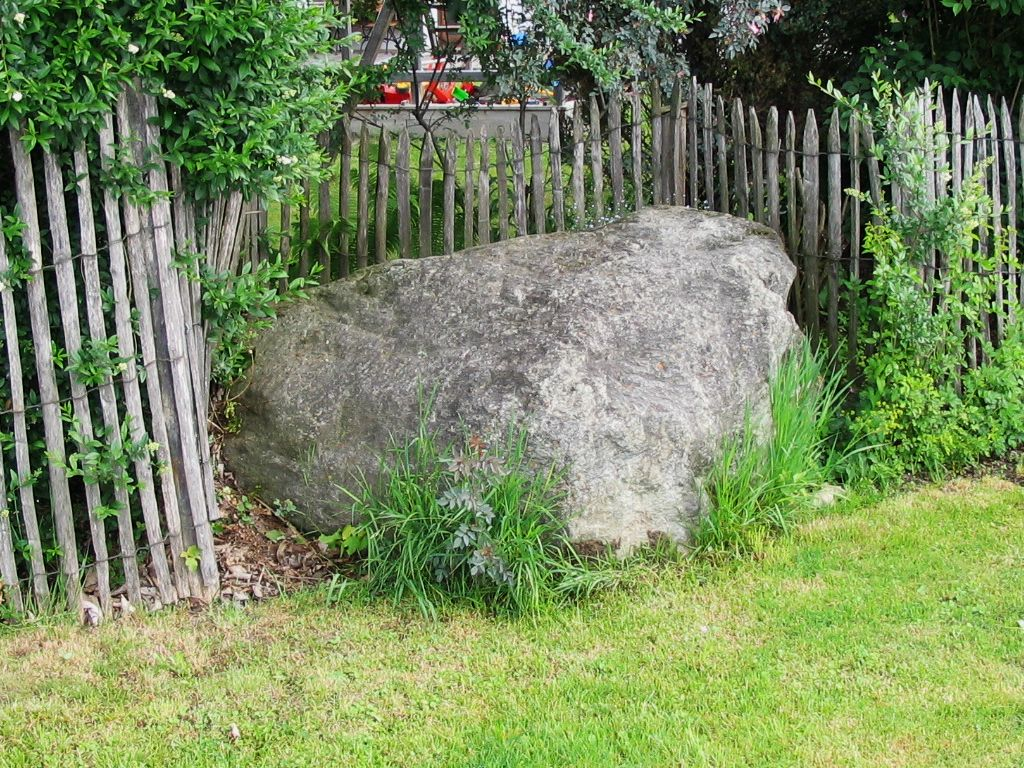
fence, encircling an erratic boulder

Stephanskirchen is located on a glacially formed plateau. The Inn river on the west and the lake Simssee are natural boundaries. The valley of the Sims river is a natural border at the south. North to Stephanskirchen are several forests and small lakes. The municipality is located within the Rosenheim-basin in the area of the former Inn Glacier. Therefore, numerous erratic boulders can be found here.

=== Subdivisions ===
The municipality is by population the third largest in the district of Rosenheim and consists of 48 parts (Ortsteile). Major settlements are Schloßberg and Haidholzen. Further settlements are: Baierbach, Eckenholz, Eichbichl, Eitzing, Entleiten, Fussen, Gehering, Graben, Grasweg, Haiden, Hofau, Hofleiten, Hofmühle, Högering, Höhensteig, Innleiten, Kieling, Kleinholzen, Kohlhaufmühle, Kragling, Kreut, Kronstauden, Krottenhausmühle, Kuglmoos, Lack, Landl, Landlmühle, Lauterbacherfilze, Leiten, Leonhardspfunzen, Murnau, Neumühle, Oed, Pulvermühle, Puster, Reikering, Schömering, Sims, Simserfilze, Simssee, Sonnenholz, Stephanskirchen, Waldering, Weinberg, Westerndorf, Westerndorferfilze and Ziegelberg.

== Emblem ==
The emblem of Stephanskirchen was created in 1954 and indicates the historic dispartment: The holy Stephanus at the top symbolizes with his holy halo the area of Stephanskirchen. He holds a golden missal with tree golden stones in his left arm. The lower part of the emblem reminds of a dinghy, a so called "Mutze". This is because in the past the major source of income in Schloßberg, Hofleiten and close to the inn-shore was fishing and shipping. The dominant green color within the emblem points to the agricultural structure of Stephanskirchen.

== History ==
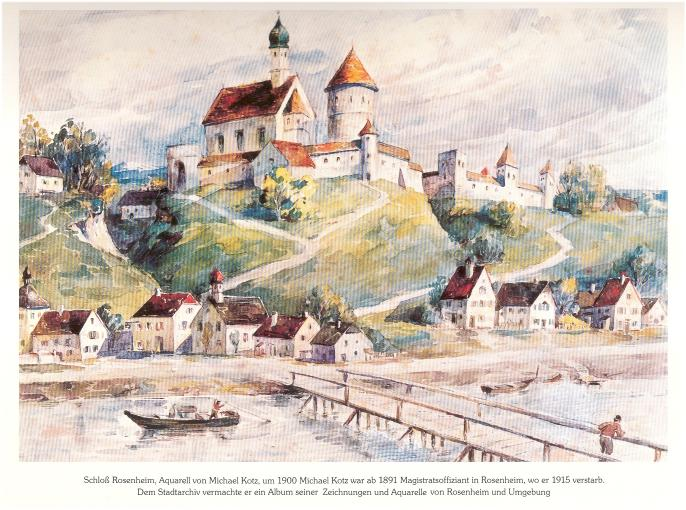
water colour of Rosenheim castle, painted around 1900 by Michael Kotz, based on old templates

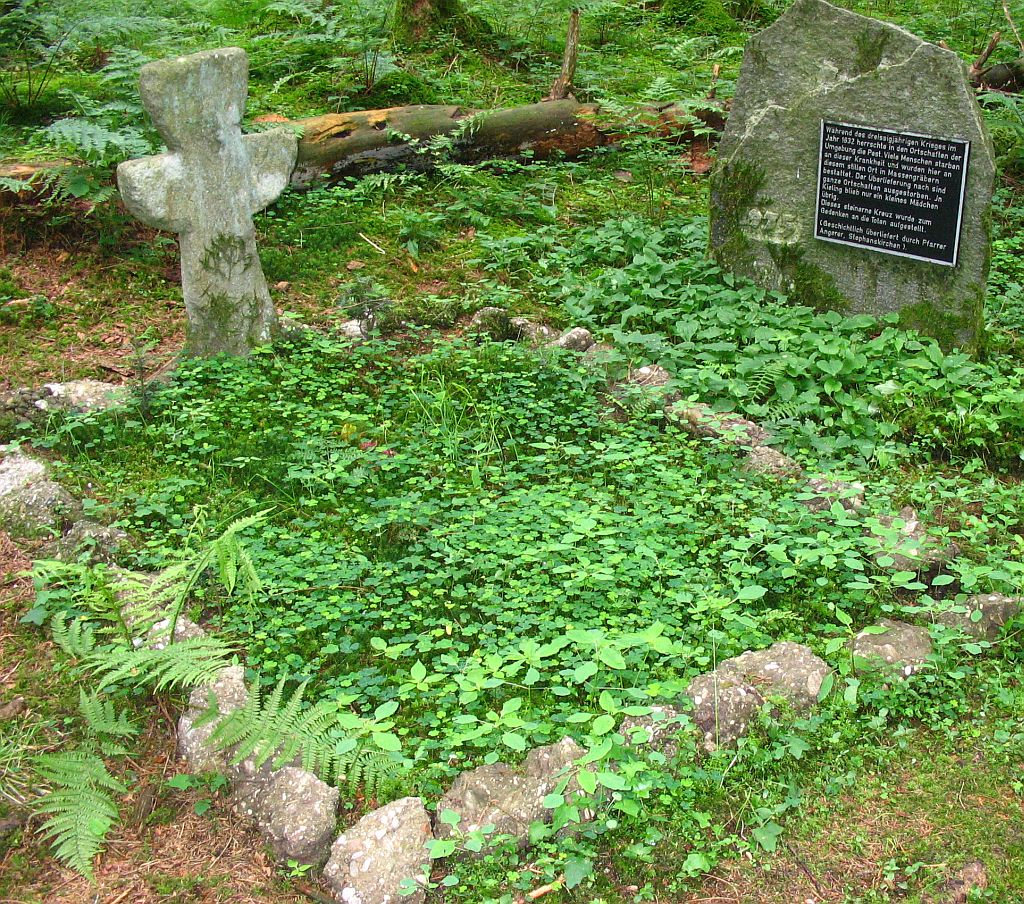
The "Pestkreuz" in the forest of Kieling

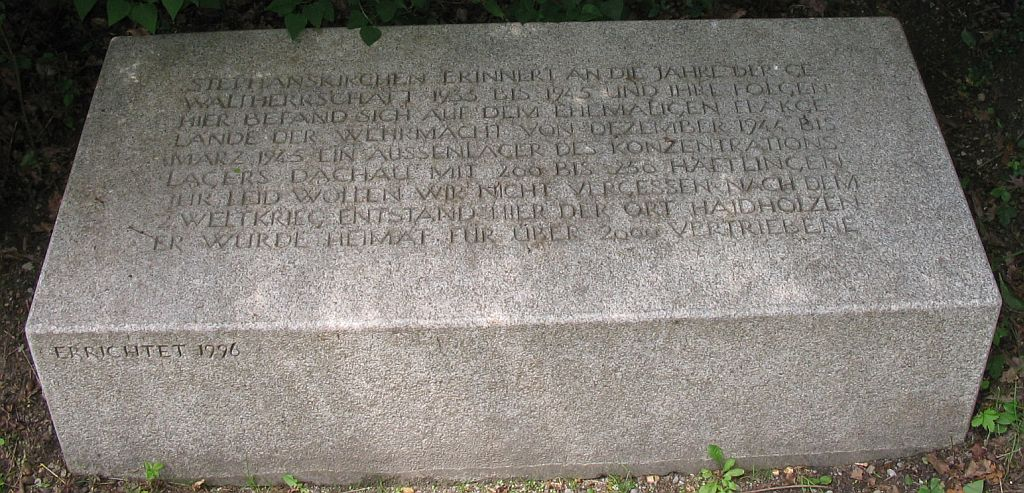
Memorial stone, reminding of those who were imprisoned here during world war two

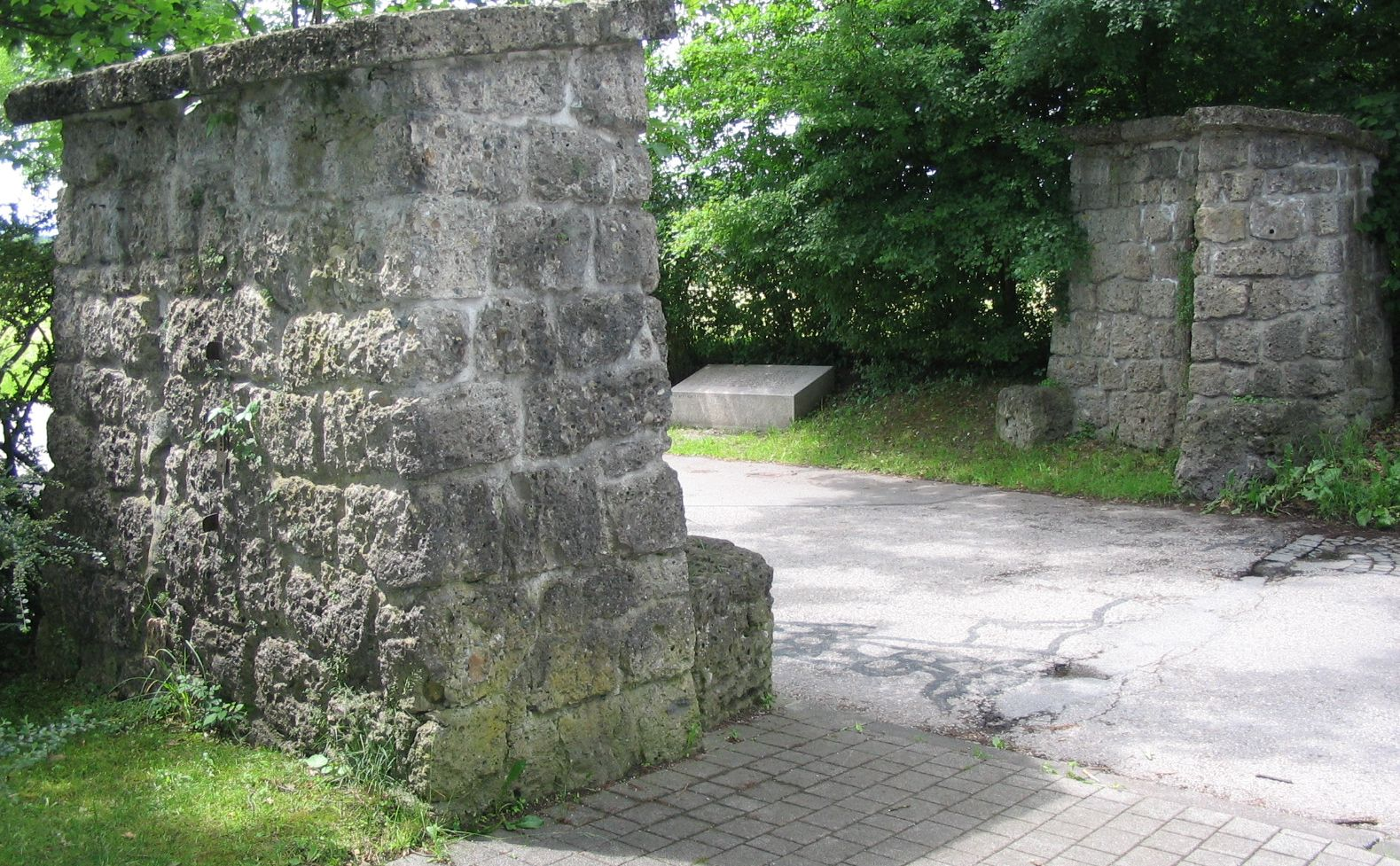
Entrance doors to the former Flak-Casern

The oldest traces were dated third and fourth century BC and can be found in the Doblergraben and at the Ziegelberg. An old Roman road crossed the River Inn at Leonhardspfunzen. The bridge was called "pons aeni" and headed westwards towards Augsburg. The first reports of a Christian church in the area around Sims are dated at 790 AD (ecclesia ad sinsa). Stephanskirchen was first mentioned in a record in the year 1130 where it was named "stevenchirgen". On the Schlossberg there was the Rosenheim castle which was first mentioned in the year 1234. It was used for administration and as a legal court of the Wittelsbacher; at the beginning of the 19th century it deteriorated.

Plague epidemic of the Middle Ages took their toll in Stephanskirchen, too. In the forest between Kieling and Baierbach a memorial stone can be found which got placed in memory of those who got buried there. The inscription reads:

Während des Dreißigjährigen Krieges im Jahr 1632 herrschte in den Ortschaften der Umgebung die Pest. Viele Menschen starben an dieser Krankheit und wurden hier an diesem stillen Ort in Massengräbern bestattet. Der Überlieferung nach sind ganze Ortschaften ausgestorben. In Kieling blieb nur ein kleines Mädchen übrig. Dieses steinerne Kreuz wurde zum Gedenken an die Toten aufgestellt. (Geschichtlich überliefert durch Pfarrer Angerer, Stephanskirchen).

Translated it says:
In the year 1632 during the Thirty Years' War a plague epidemic ruled in the surrounding villages. Many humans died due to that disease and got buried in mass graves at this silent place. According to historical tradition, entire villages have died out. In Kieling only a little girl survived. This stone cross was erected to commemorate the dead. (Historically handed down by Pastor Angerer, Stephanskirchen).

Rural structures were predominant in the ancestor areas of the municipality Stephanskirchen up to the 18th century. Stephanskirchen and the newly developed workers and day labourer housing estate Hofleiten became autonoumous political communities through the Bavarian administrative reform of the year 1818. In 1854 Hofleiten and Stephanskirchen got unified. Due to the social differences fierce conflicts between parts of the community persisted until the late 19th century. Since 1900 Schloßberg became the largest part of the municipality due to its vicinity to Rosenheim.

Between 1944 and March 31, 1945 in the district Haidholzen there was a subcamp of the Dachau concentration camp housing around 6000 prisoners. Polish (Jewish), Russian and French concentration camp prisoners were captured in a large barrack settlement within the area. One main building of this concentration camp exists until today; since 1947 there are manufacturing facilities of a candy factory. The prisoners worked for regional contractors and for the "Chiemgauer Vertriebsgesellschaft O.H.G.", which was a subsidiary of the company BMW. They produced plane engines there but never fully went into production. Several independent sources report about homicides of the imprisoned people. By the end of 1944 the production plant became a target of air attacks during which two employees were killed. 30% of the buildings and 20% of the machinery were destroyed, the created damage was rated 250,000 ℛ︁ℳ︁. By command of Heinrich Himmler an evacuation into rearward concentration camps started in March and April 1945 during which many prisoners died due to exhaustion or being shot by the SS.

After the end of World War II around 1500 refugees and expellees came to Stephanskirchen and founded the settlement Haidholzen close to the former so called "flak casern" (propaganda term, even used after WWII). Streets named "Schlesierstraße" or "Sudetenlandstraße" remind up to today of the origin of these people.

== Famous people ==
- Otfried Preußler (20 October 1923 – 18 February 2013), author of many children's books ("The Satanic Mill", "The Little Witch", "The Robber Hotzenplotz")
- Nikolaus Burggraf und Graf zu Dohna-Schlodien (5 April 1879 – 21 August 1956), German naval officer and author.

== Companies and infrastructure ==
Two internationally known companies can be found in Stephanskirchen: Marc O'Polo, which has its international headquarters there, and ARRI.

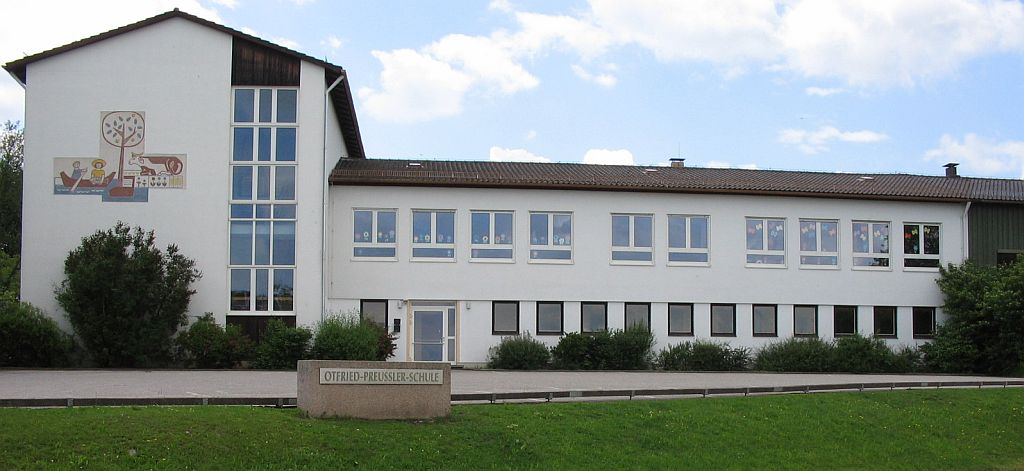
Otfried-Preußler-Schule

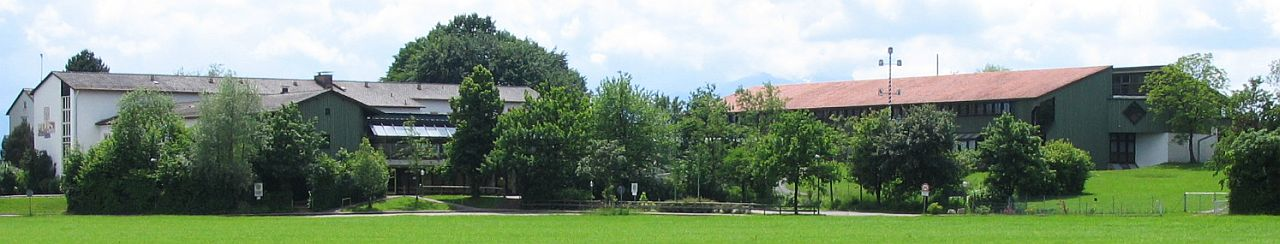
Otfried-Preußler-Schule

In 1978 an elementary school was opened in Stephanskirchen; like 7 other schools in Germany it is named in honor of the author Otfried Preußler, who lives in Haidholzen. The Otfried-Preußler-Schule is the only currently participating UNESCO project school of all schools in Bavaria. Around 550 pupils are spread amongst 25 classes. The elementary school has 8 classes and the "Hauptschule" has 17 classes; of those, 6 lead to a secondary school level certificate. An after-school supervision is offered by the "Arche"-association.

In Schloßberg there is the "Volksschule Schloßberg", an elementary school hosting about 200 pupils.

There are four Kindergartens in Stephanskirchen. The Catholic Kindergarten "St. Georg" in Schloßberg, the Catholic Kindergarten "Sonnenschein" in Haidholzen, the Catholic Church Kindergarten "Bärenstube" in Stephanskirchen and the Protestant Kindergarten "Regenbogen" in Schloßberg.

In 2003 a new town hall was opened in Schloßberg.

== Tourist attractions ==
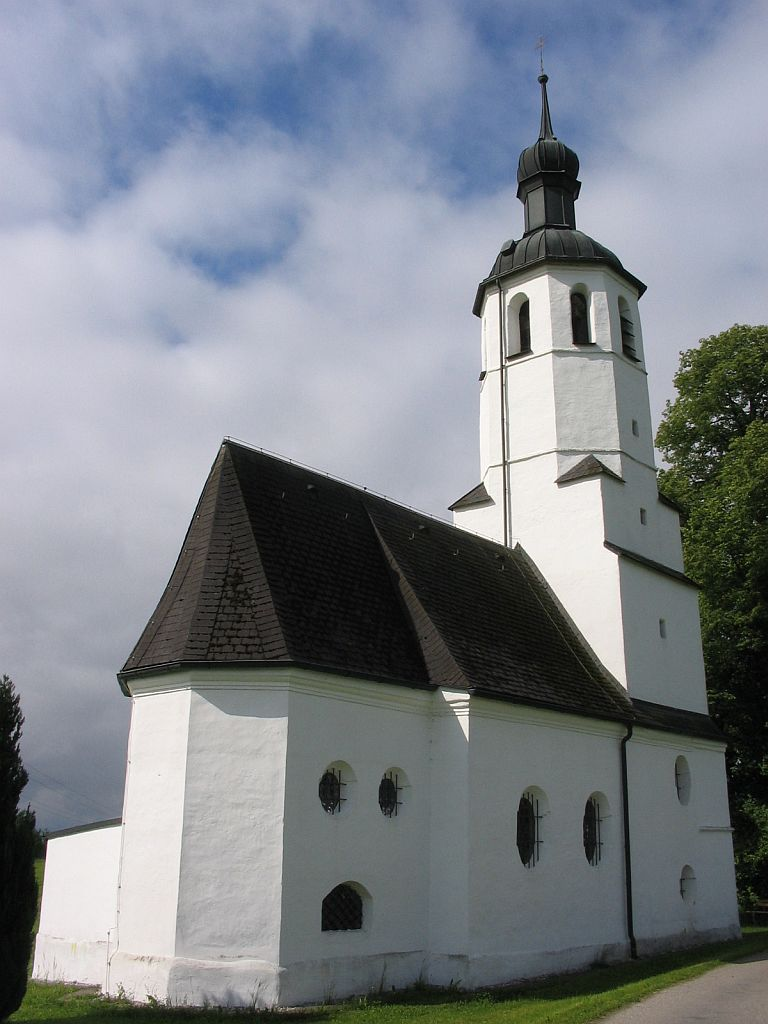
Church "Zu den heiligen 14 Nothelfern"; Kleinholzen, Gemeinde Stephanskirchen

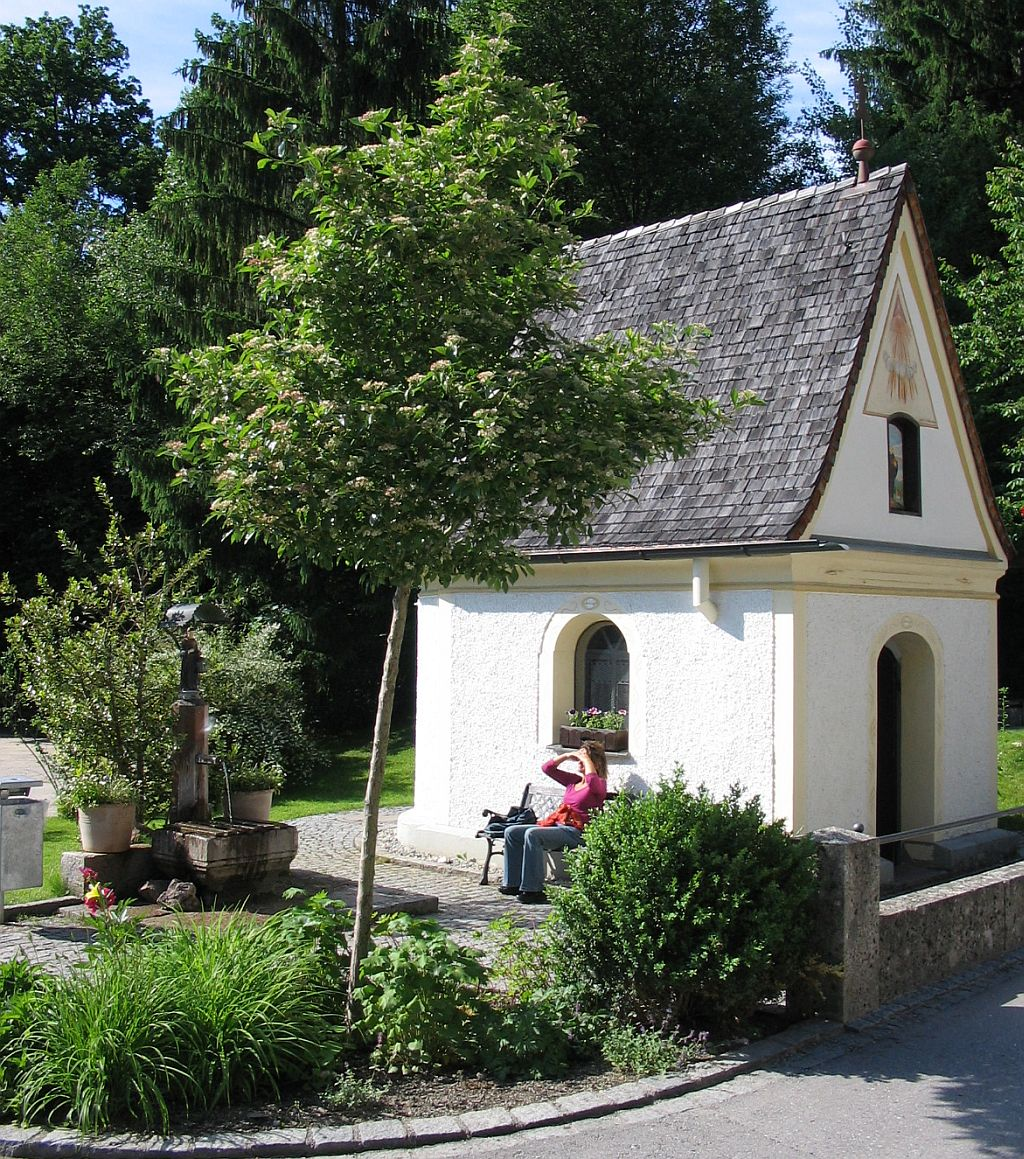
Fountain chapel und fountain; St. Leonhard, Gemeinde Stephanskirchen

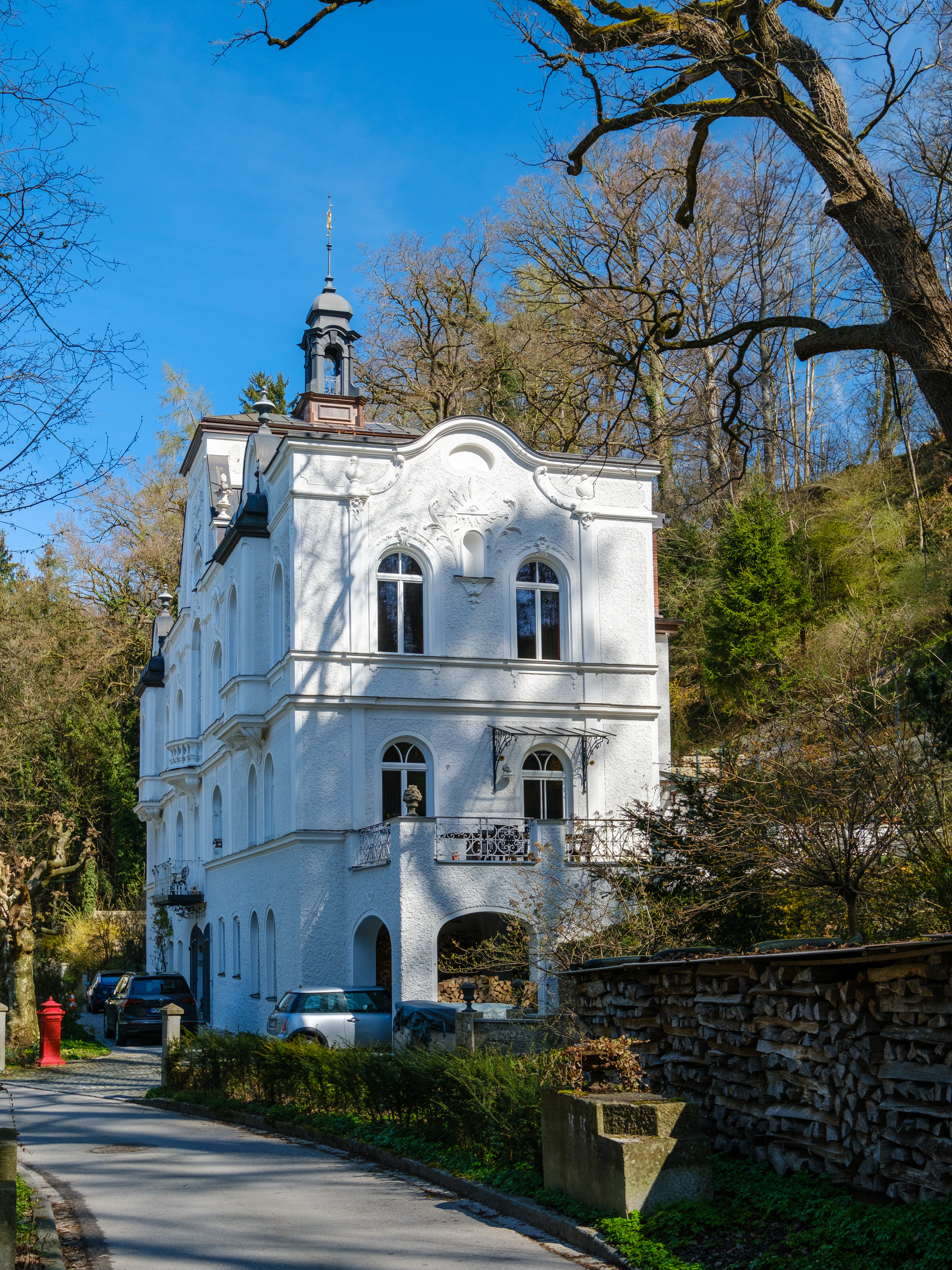
Innleiten castle
- The world's largest art-clock in the wine tavern of the restaurant Gocklwirt (constructor: Josef Kreß 1880-1886)
- Church St. Magdalena in Baierbach
- Church "zu den heiligen 14 Nothelfern" in Kleinholzen
- St. Leonhards church in Leonhardspfunzen
- fountain chapel in Leonhardspfunzen
- Innleiten castle, built in 1894 by Thomas Gillizer; it was built in new baroque style in settlement Innleiten
