= Vogtareuth =

- Municipality
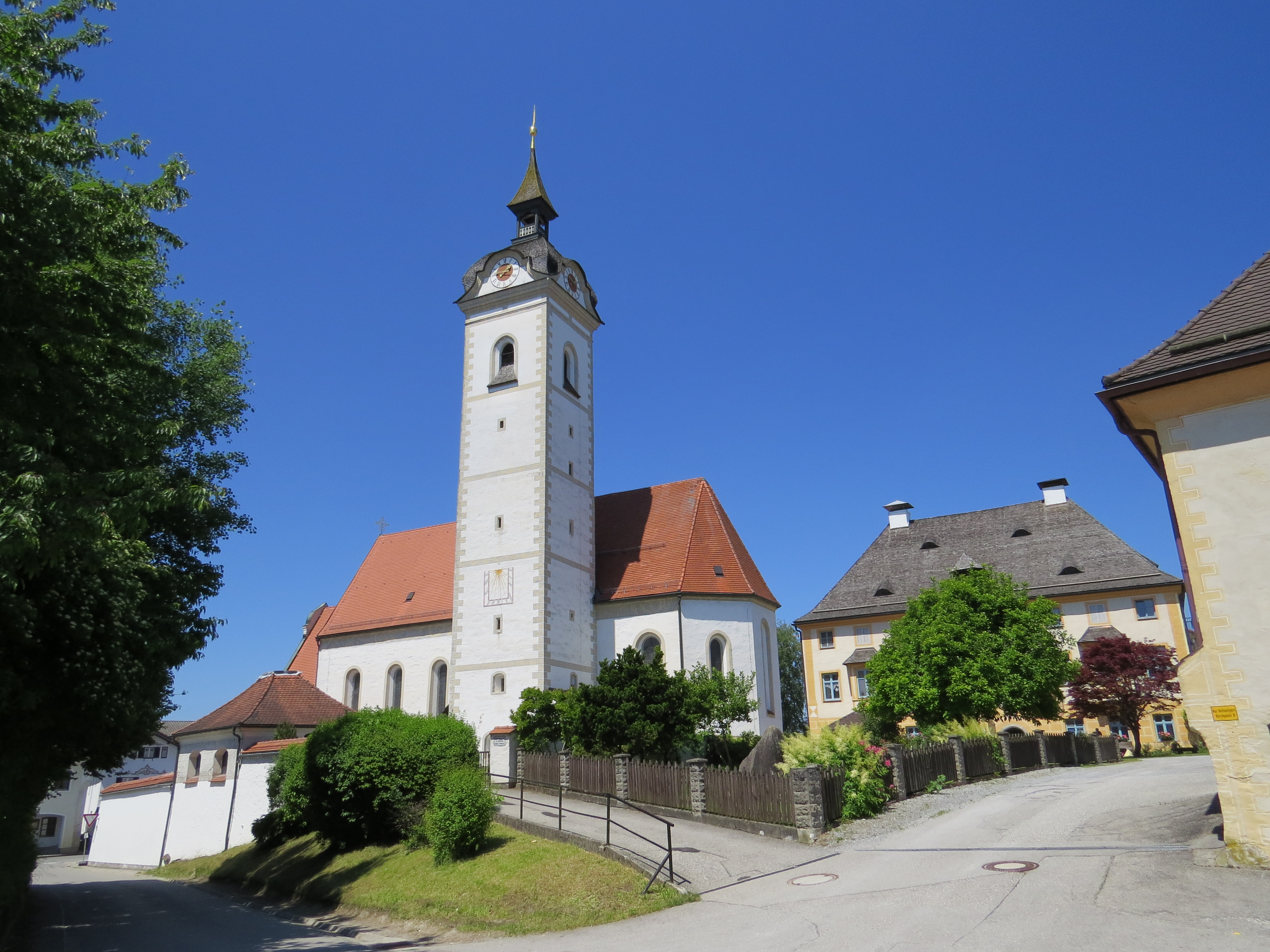
- Church of Saint Emmeram

- Coat of arms

- Location of Vogtareuth within Rosenheim district
- Interactive map of Vogtareuth
- Location within Germany Location within Bavaria
- Coordinates: 47°57′N 12°11′E
- Country: Germany
- State: Bavaria
- Admin. region: Oberbayern
- District: Rosenheim

Government
  - Mayor (2020–26): Rudolf Leitmannstetter

Area
  - Total: 34.23 km^{2} (13.22 sq mi)
- Elevation: 484 m (1,588 ft)

Population (2025-12-31)
  - Total: 3,097
  - Density: 90.48/km^{2} (234.3/sq mi)
- Time zone: UTC+01:00 (CET)
  - Summer (DST): UTC+02:00 (CEST)
- Postal codes: 83569
- Dialling codes: 08038
- Vehicle registration: RO
- Website: www.vogtareuth.de

Vogtareuth (Central Bavarian: Vogtareith) is a municipality in the district of Rosenheim in Bavaria in Germany. It lies on the river Inn.
