= Schechen =

- Municipality
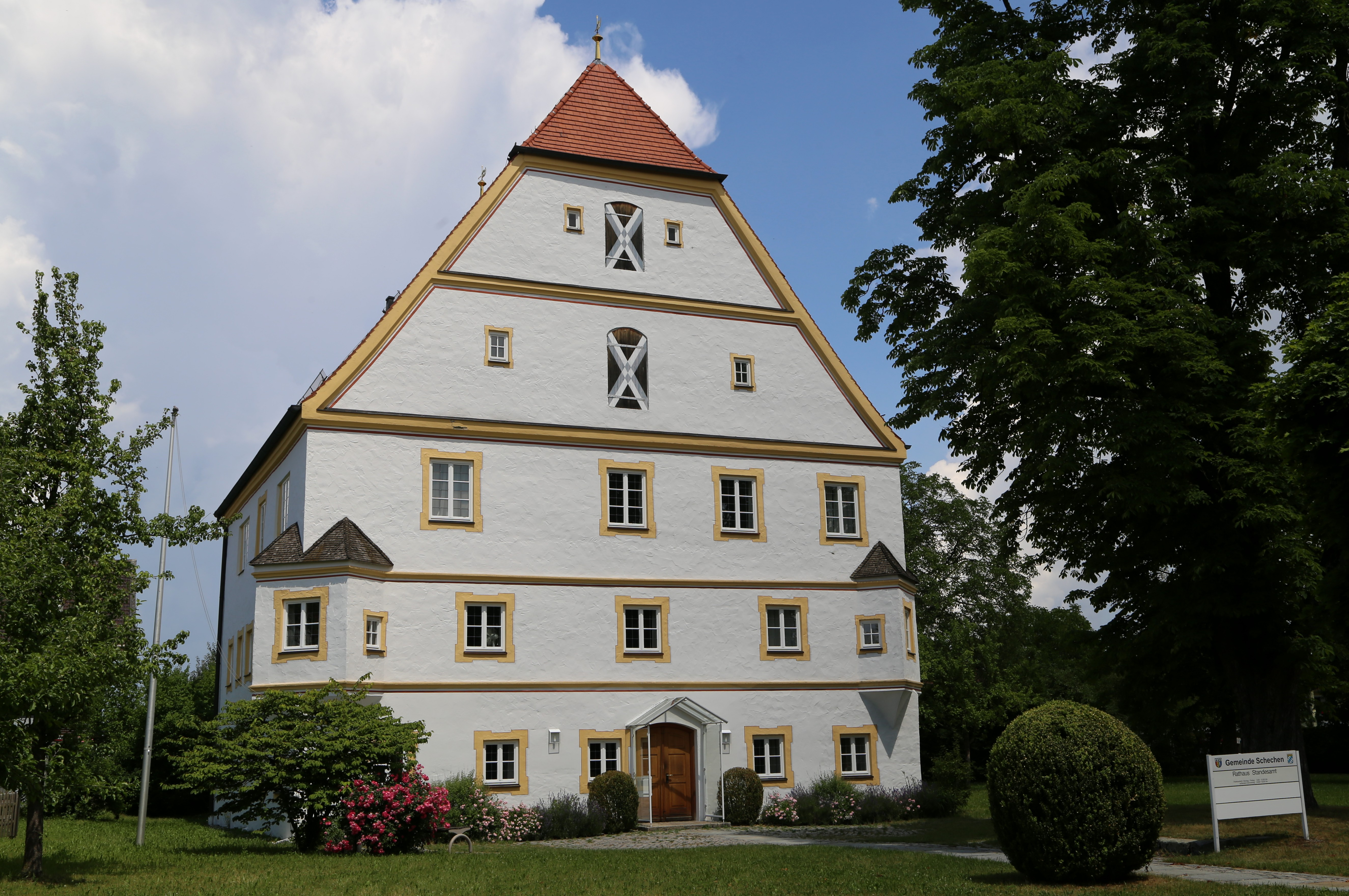
- Town hall

- Coat of arms

- Location of Schechen within Rosenheim district
- Interactive map of Schechen
- Location within Germany Location within Bavaria
- Coordinates: 47°55′44″N 12°07′31″E
- Country: Germany
- State: Bavaria
- Admin. region: Oberbayern
- District: Rosenheim

Government
  - Mayor (2020–26): Stefan Adam (CSU)

Area
  - Total: 31.53 km^{2} (12.17 sq mi)
- Elevation: 440 m (1,440 ft)

Population (2025-12-31)
  - Total: 5,380
  - Density: 171/km^{2} (442/sq mi)
- Time zone: UTC+01:00 (CET)
  - Summer (DST): UTC+02:00 (CEST)
- Postal codes: 83135
- Dialling codes: 08031, 08039, 08067
- Vehicle registration: RO
- Website: www.schechen.de

Schechen (German pronunciation: [ˈʃɛçn̩]; Central Bavarian: Schecha) is a municipality in the district of Rosenheim in Bavaria in Germany. It lies on the river Inn.

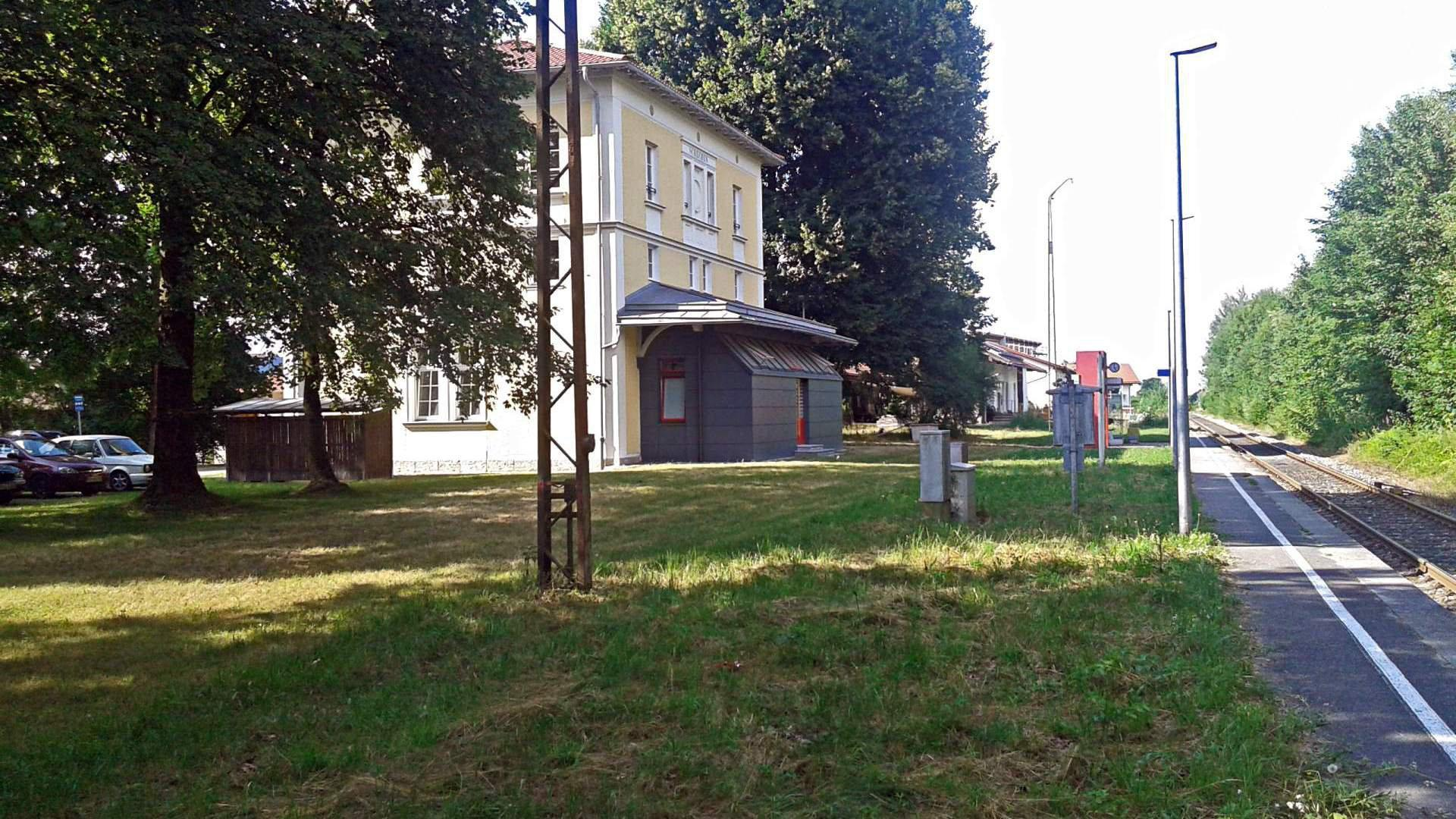
Schechen station

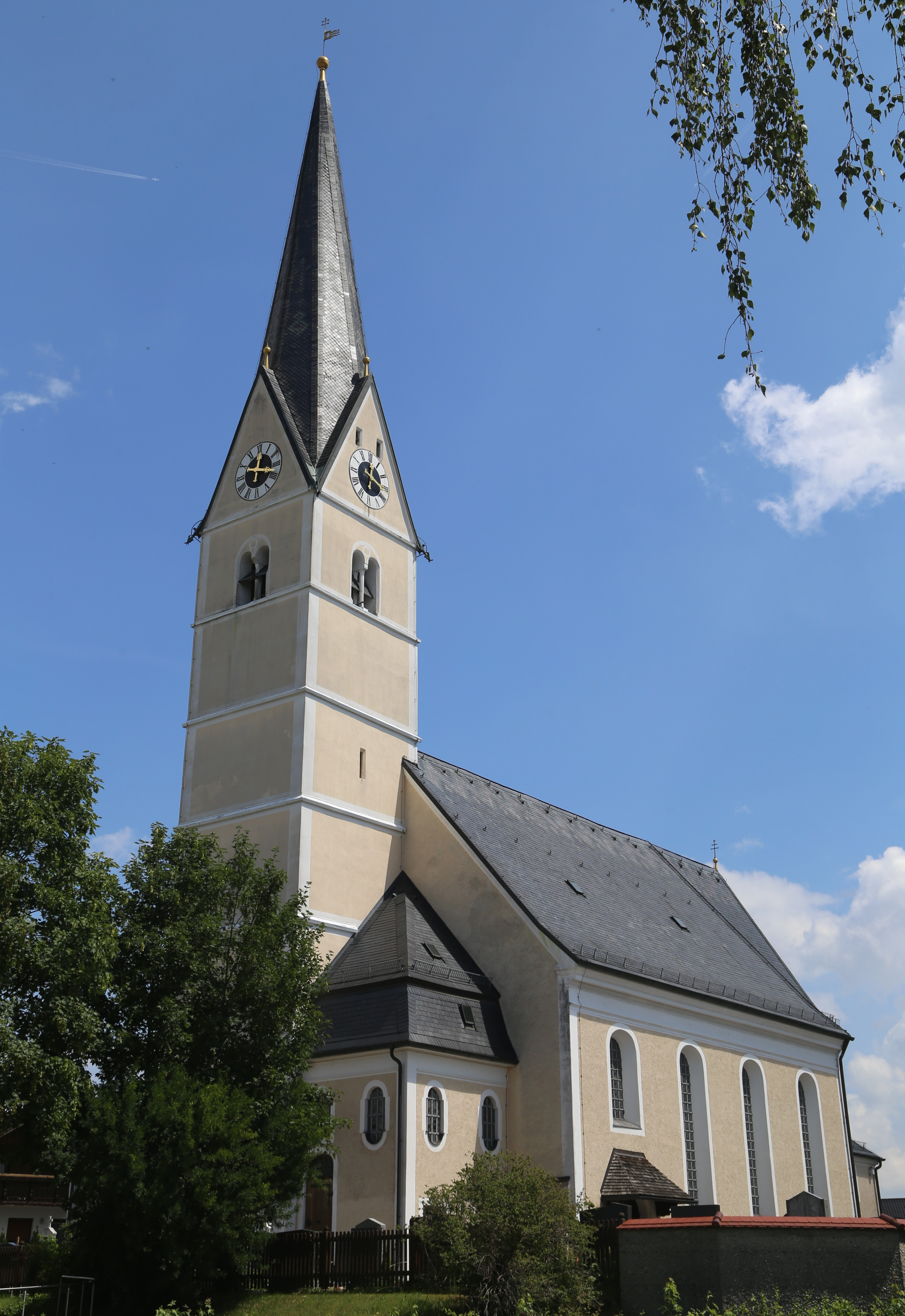
Church St. Laurentius

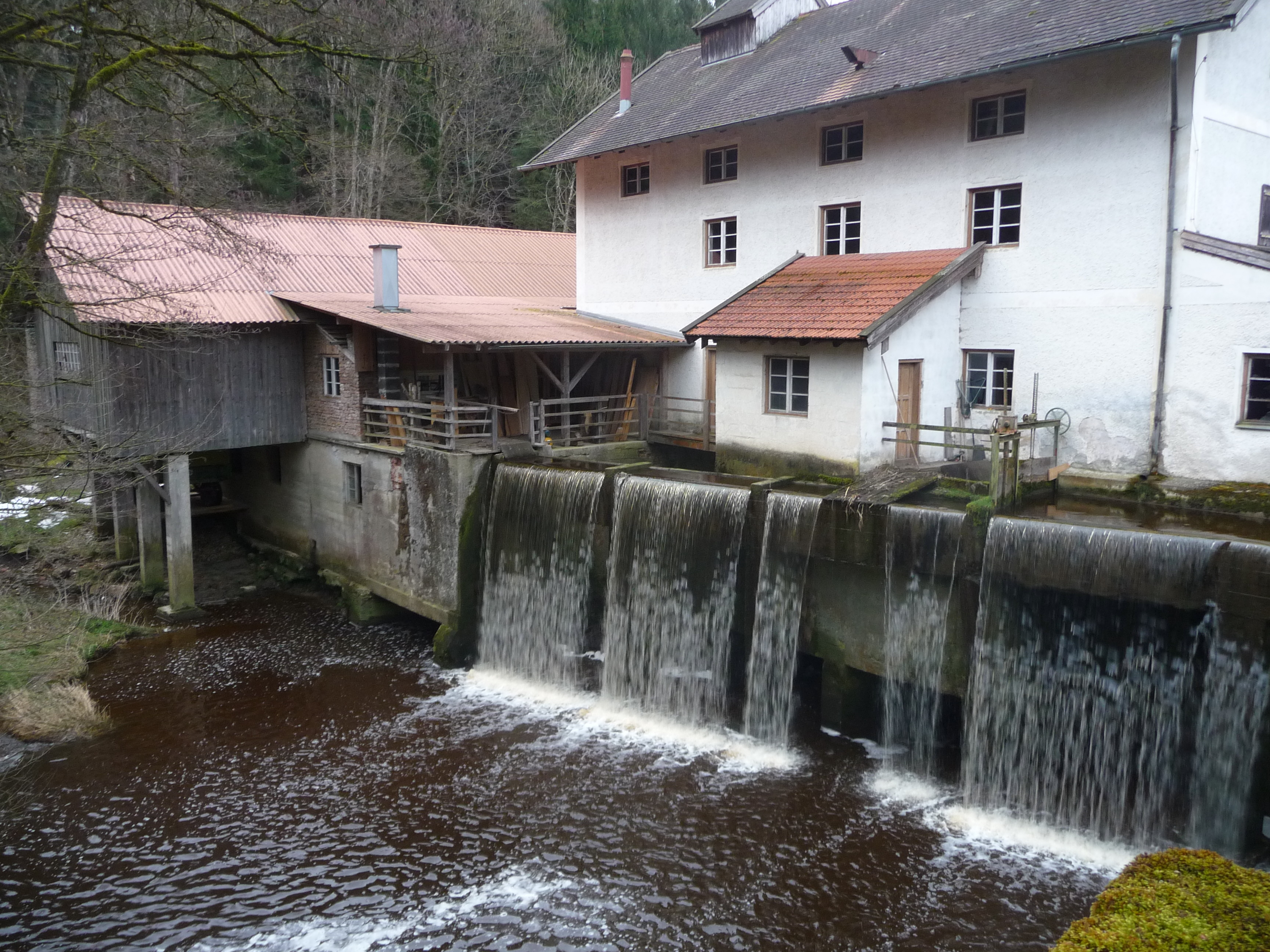
Rottmühle, a mill at the Rott
