= Eiselfing =

- Municipality
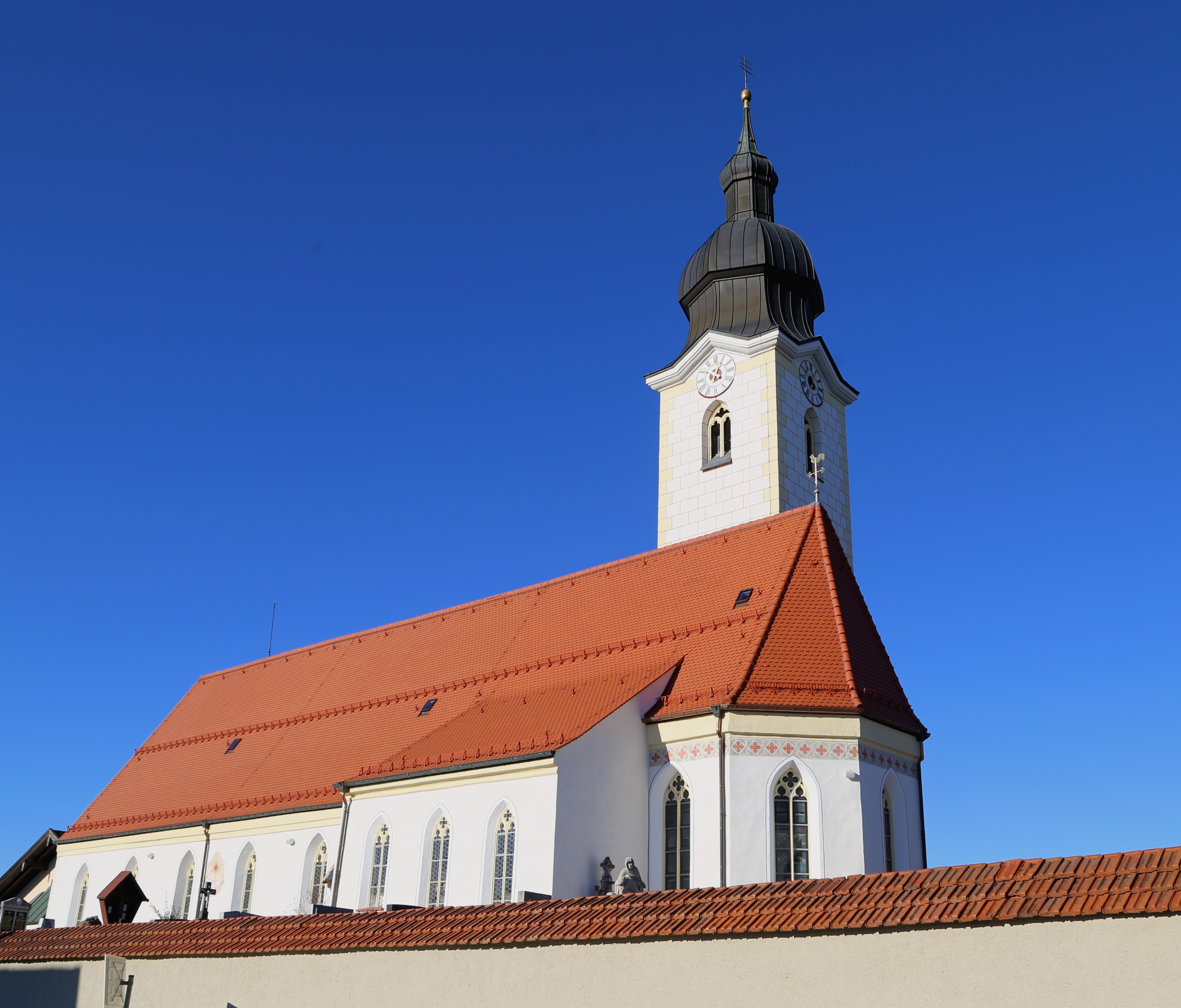
- Church of Saint Rupert

- Coat of arms

- Location of Eiselfing within Rosenheim district
- Interactive map of Eiselfing
- Location within Germany Location within Bavaria
- Coordinates: 48°3′N 12°14′E
- Country: Germany
- State: Bavaria
- Admin. region: Oberbayern
- District: Rosenheim

Government
  - Mayor (2020–26): Georg Reinthaler (Greens)

Area
  - Total: 34.89 km^{2} (13.47 sq mi)
- Elevation: 470 m (1,540 ft)

Population (2025-12-31)
  - Total: 3,314
  - Density: 94.98/km^{2} (246.0/sq mi)
- Time zone: UTC+01:00 (CET)
  - Summer (DST): UTC+02:00 (CEST)
- Postal codes: 83549
- Dialling codes: 08071
- Vehicle registration: RO
- Website: www.eiselfing.eu

Eiselfing (German pronunciation: [ˈaɪzl̩fɪŋ]; Central Bavarian: Oaslfing) is a municipality in the district of Rosenheim in Bavaria in Germany.
