= Babensham =

- Municipality
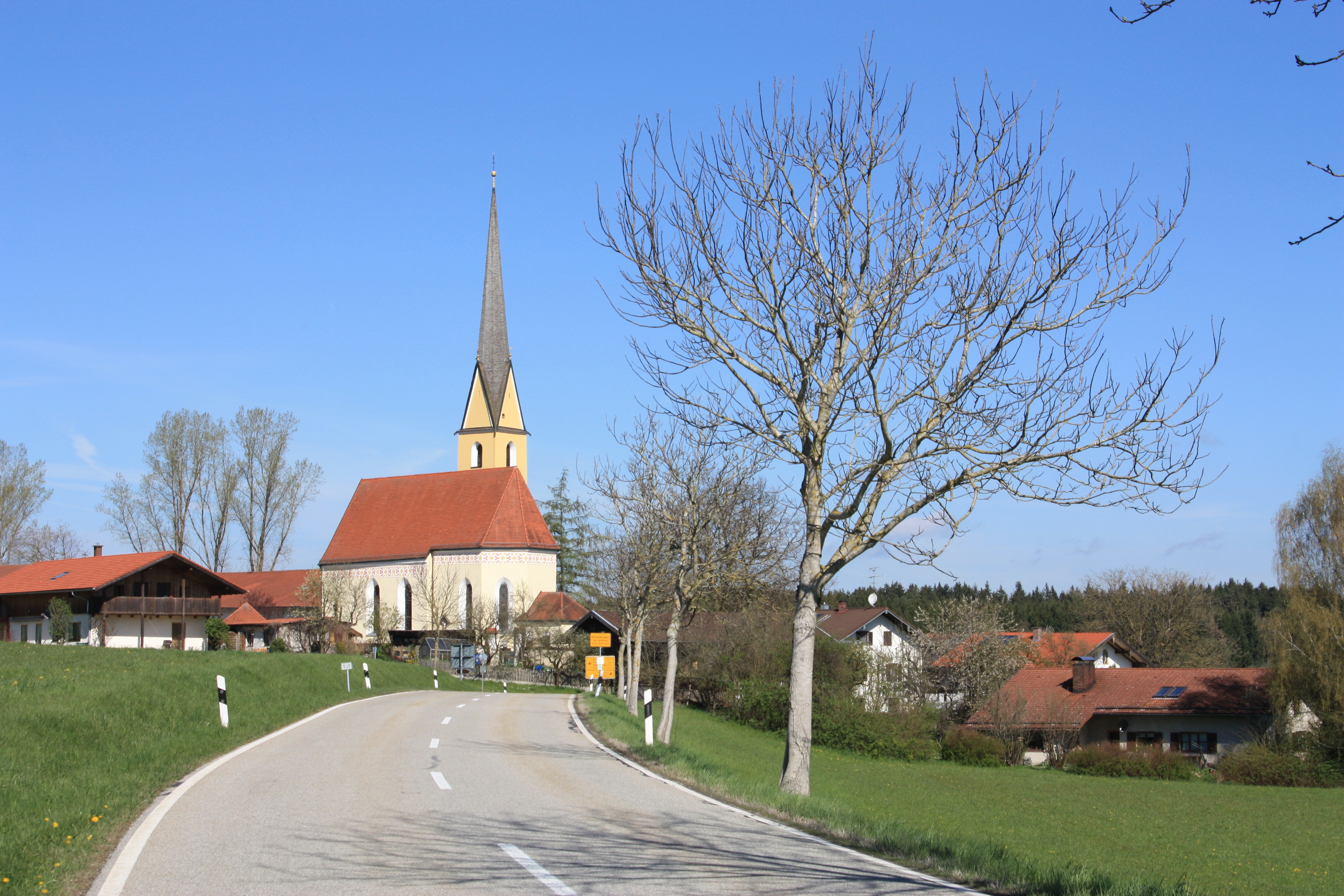
- Kirchloibersdorf, part of Babensham

- Coat of arms

- Location of Babensham within Rosenheim district
- Interactive map of Babensham
- Location within Germany Location within Bavaria
- Coordinates: 48°5′N 12°16′E
- Country: Germany
- State: Bavaria
- Admin. region: Oberbayern
- District: Rosenheim

Government
  - Mayor (2020–26): Josef Huber

Area
  - Total: 54.33 km^{2} (20.98 sq mi)
- Elevation: 488 m (1,601 ft)

Population (2025-12-31)
  - Total: 3,145
  - Density: 57.89/km^{2} (149.9/sq mi)
- Time zone: UTC+01:00 (CET)
  - Summer (DST): UTC+02:00 (CEST)
- Postal codes: 83547
- Dialling codes: 08071
- Vehicle registration: RO
- Website: www.babensham.de

Babensham (Central Bavarian: Bomsham /bɔms'ham/) is a municipality in the district of Rosenheim in Bavaria in Germany. It lies on the river Inn.

== Heraldry ==
Babensham	Blazon: "Divided per pale argent and azure, in the dexter a black lion with a red tongue and a red sword in its paws, in the sinister a silver lion rampant."
