= Bad Endorf =

- Municipality
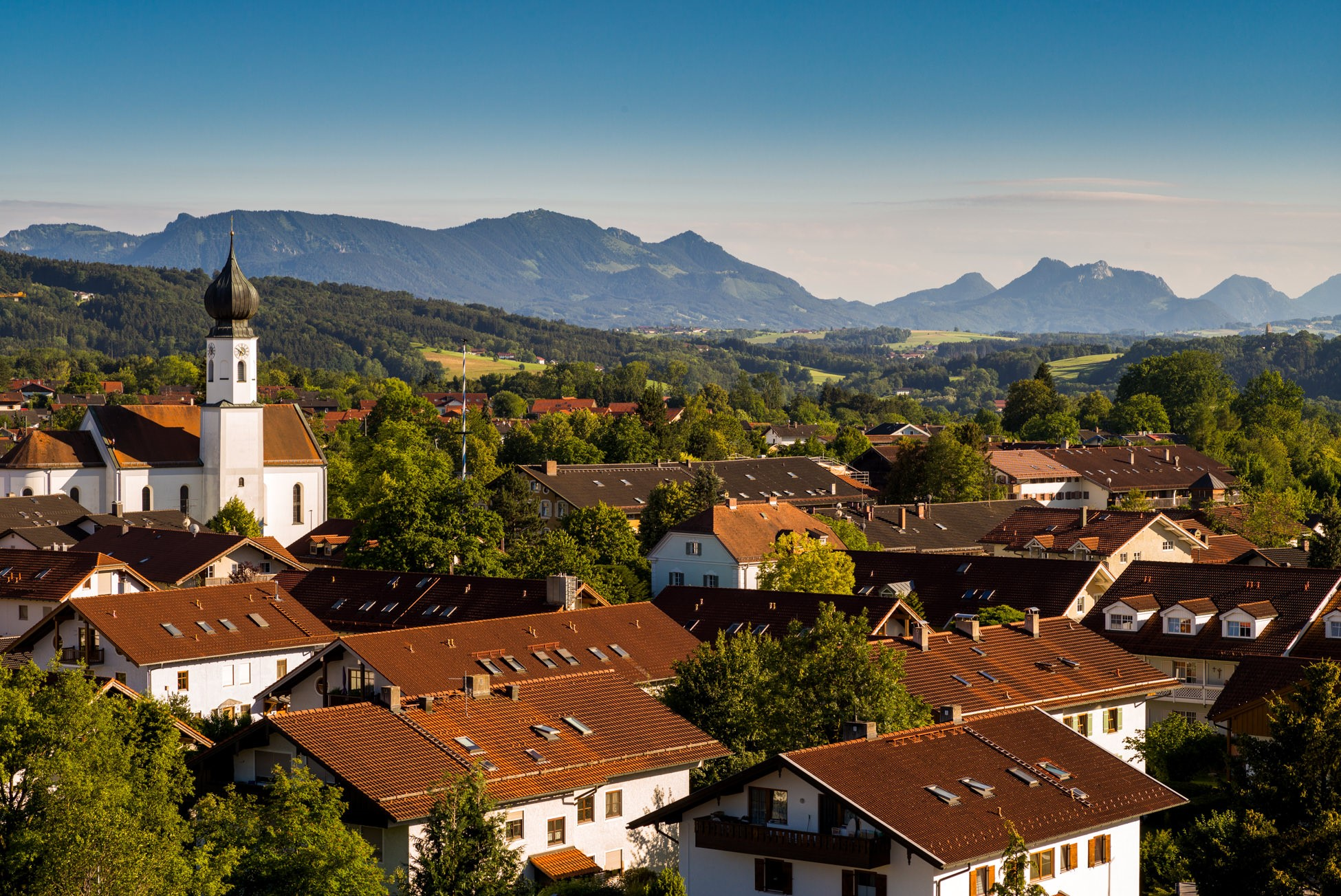
- View of Bad Endorf

- Coat of arms

- Location of Bad Endorf within Rosenheim district
- Interactive map of Bad Endorf
- Location within Germany Location within Bavaria
- Coordinates: 47°54′N 12°18′E
- Country: Germany
- State: Bavaria
- Admin. region: Oberbayern
- District: Rosenheim

Government
  - Mayor (2020–26): Alois Loferer

Area
  - Total: 40.1 km^{2} (15.5 sq mi)
- Elevation: 525–600 m (1,722–1,969 ft)

Population (2025-12-31)
  - Total: 8,207
  - Density: 205/km^{2} (530/sq mi)
- Time zone: UTC+01:00 (CET)
  - Summer (DST): UTC+02:00 (CEST)
- Postal codes: 83093
- Dialling codes: 08053
- Vehicle registration: RO
- Website: www.bad-endorf.de

Bad Endorf (German pronunciation: [baːt ˈʔɛndɔʁf]) is a municipality and a village in the district of Rosenheim in Bavaria in Germany. The market town is located about 15 km outside of Rosenheim and is in close proximity to Lake Simssee and Chiemsee lake and its larger shore towns, Prien, Gstadt, and Seebruck.

The town is home to a large health spa, as well as the German Federal Police winter sports training center which is famous for "producing" medal winners at the Winter Olympics such as female speed skater Claudia Pechstein.

Bad Endorf has one main bus station and several minor ones located around the town for regional destinations. The town also has a Deutsche Bahn railway station on the Rosenheim–Salzburg line with service to minor towns in the area as well as Rosenheim, Munich, and Salzburg, Austria.
