= Edling, Germany =

Edling
- Municipality
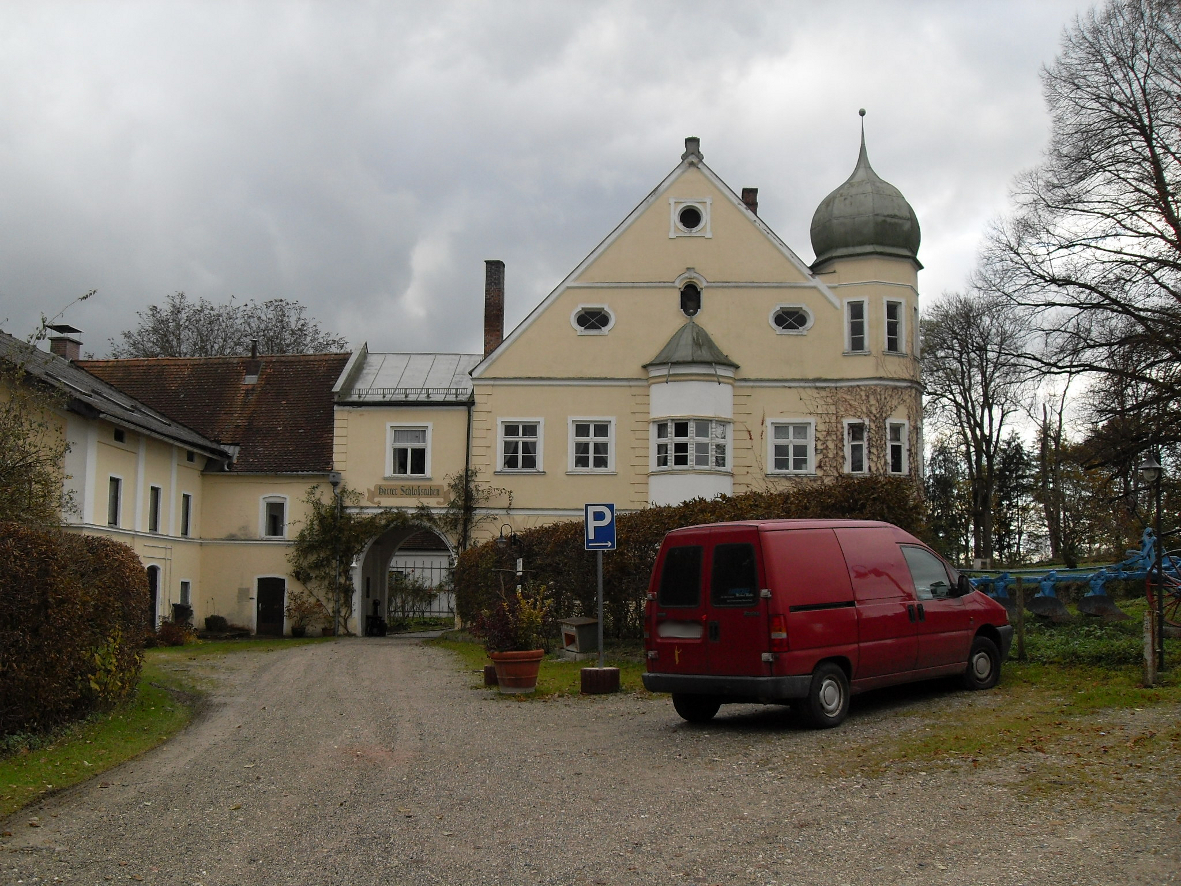
- Hart Castle

- Coat of arms

- Location of Edling within Rosenheim district
- Interactive map of Edling
- Location within Germany Location within Bavaria
- Coordinates: 48°4′N 12°10′E
- Country: Germany
- State: Bavaria
- Admin. region: Oberbayern
- District: Rosenheim

Government
  - Mayor (2020–26): Matthias Schnetzer (CSU)

Area
  - Total: 20.04 km^{2} (7.74 sq mi)
- Elevation: 477 m (1,565 ft)

Population (2025-12-31)
  - Total: 4,281
  - Density: 213.6/km^{2} (553.3/sq mi)
- Time zone: UTC+01:00 (CET)
  - Summer (DST): UTC+02:00 (CEST)
- Postal codes: 83533
- Dialling codes: 08071
- Vehicle registration: RO
- Website: www.edling.de

Edling is a village and a municipality in the district of Rosenheim in Bavaria in Germany.
