= Prutting =

- Municipality
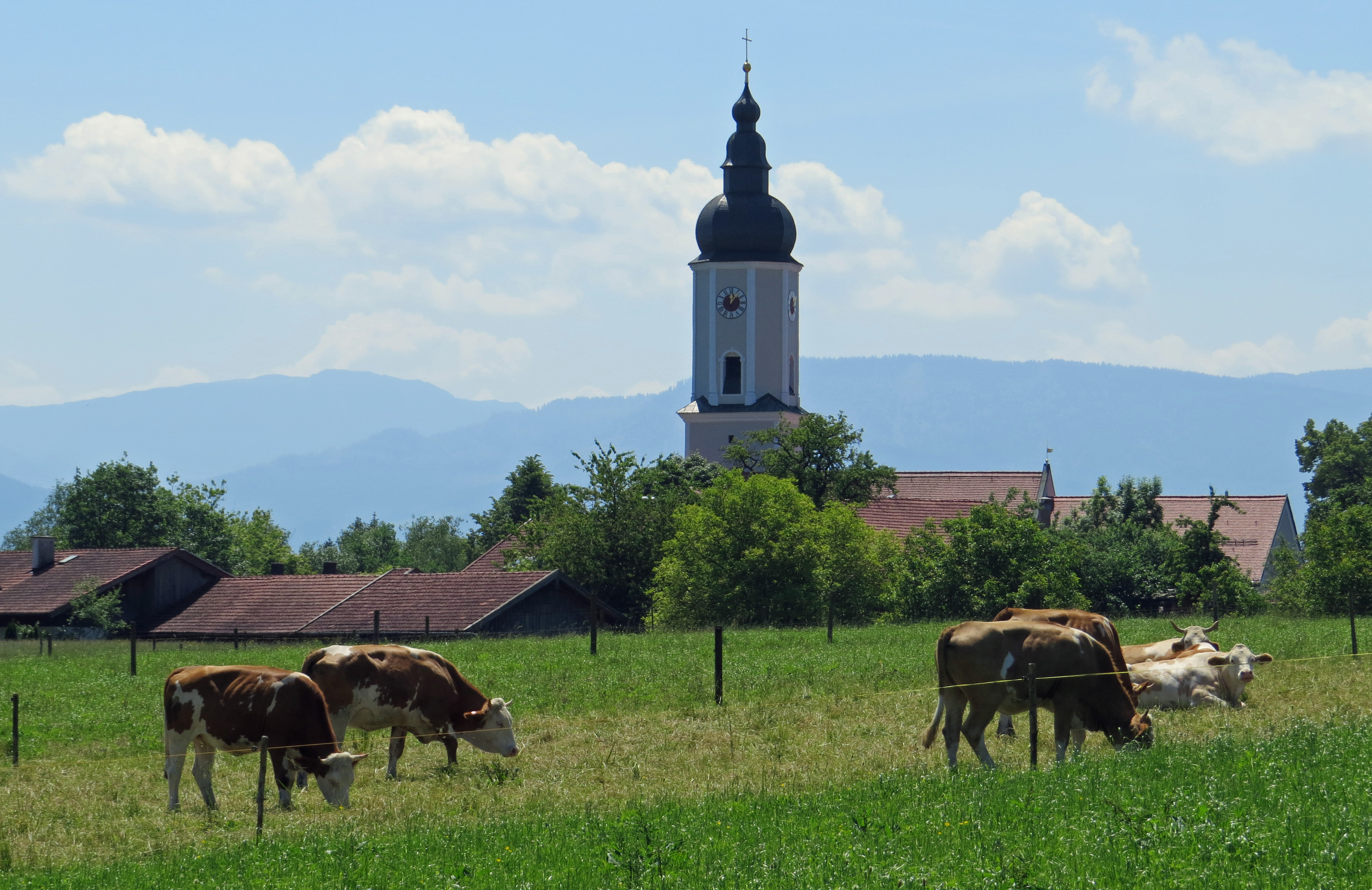
- Prutting seen from the north

- Coat of arms

- Location of Prutting within Rosenheim district
- Interactive map of Prutting
- Location within Germany Location within Bavaria
- Coordinates: 47°54′N 12°12′E
- Country: Germany
- State: Bavaria
- Admin. region: Oberbayern
- District: Rosenheim

Government
  - Mayor (2020–26): Johannes Thusbaß

Area
  - Total: 16.22 km^{2} (6.26 sq mi)
- Elevation: 496 m (1,627 ft)

Population (2025-12-31)
  - Total: 2,918
  - Density: 179.9/km^{2} (465.9/sq mi)
- Time zone: UTC+01:00 (CET)
  - Summer (DST): UTC+02:00 (CEST)
- Postal codes: 83134
- Dialling codes: 08036
- Vehicle registration: RO
- Website: www.prutting.de

Prutting (German pronunciation: [ˈpʁʊtɪŋ]) is a municipality in the district of Rosenheim in Bavaria in Germany.
