= Eggstätt =

- Municipality
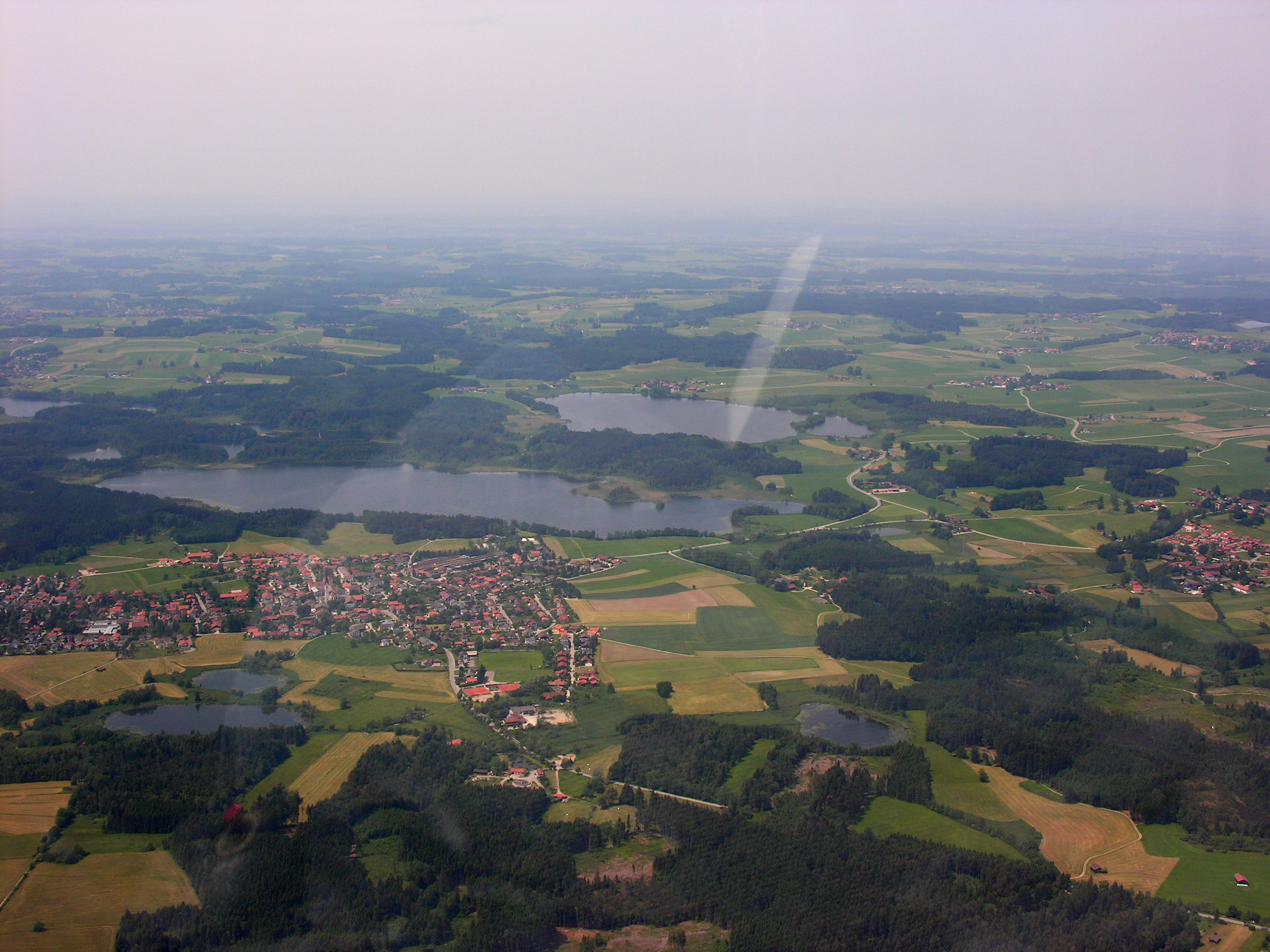
- Aerial view

- Coat of arms

- Location of Eggstätt within Rosenheim district
- Interactive map of Eggstätt
- Location within Germany Location within Bavaria
- Coordinates: 47°56′N 12°23′E
- Country: Germany
- State: Bavaria
- Admin. region: Oberbayern
- District: Rosenheim

Government
  - Mayor (2023–29): Christoph Kraus

Area
  - Total: 24.29 km^{2} (9.38 sq mi)
- Elevation: 539 m (1,768 ft)

Population (2025-12-31)
  - Total: 2,831
  - Density: 116.6/km^{2} (301.9/sq mi)
- Time zone: UTC+01:00 (CET)
  - Summer (DST): UTC+02:00 (CEST)
- Postal codes: 83125
- Dialling codes: 08056
- Vehicle registration: RO
- Website: www.eggstaett.de

Eggstätt (German pronunciation: [ˈɛkʃtɛt]) is a municipality in the district of Rosenheim in Bavaria in Germany.

Eggstätt is situated on a flat ridge (539 m) between a forested, undulating region and the wetland area to the northwest of Lake Chiemsee. The Eggstätt-Hemhof Lakes District contains 17 smaller and larger lakes surrounding the township. There is evidence of human settlement in the area dating back to the Bronze Age; the name Eggstaett (“Echistat”) was first documented in the year 925 AD.
