= Breitbrunn am Chiemsee =

- Municipality
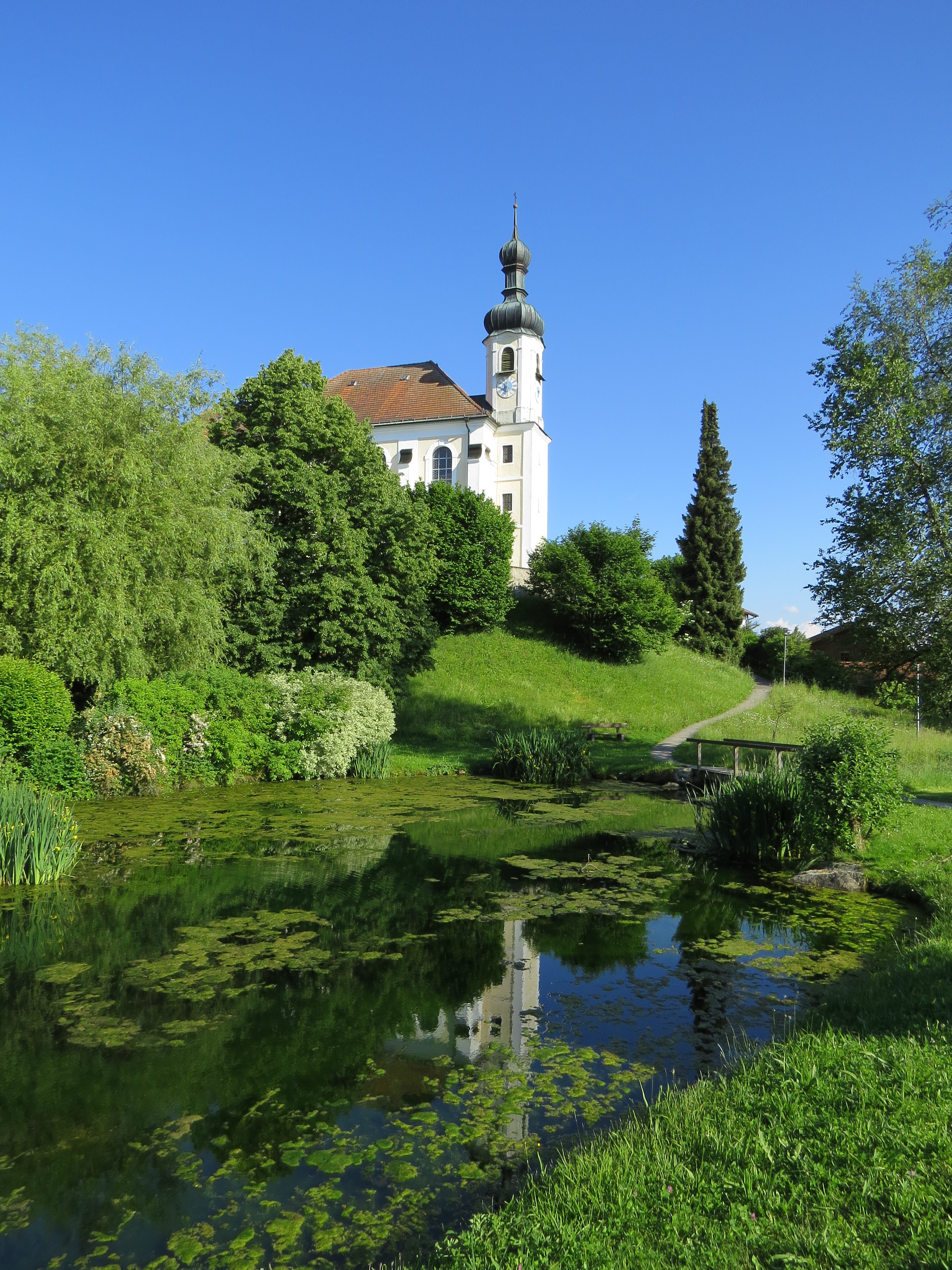
- Church of Saint John the Baptist in Breitbrunn

- Coat of arms

- Location of Breitbrunn am Chiemsee within Rosenheim district
- Interactive map of Breitbrunn am Chiemsee
- Location within Germany Location within Bavaria
- Coordinates: 47°53′N 12°24′E
- Country: Germany
- State: Bavaria
- Admin. region: Oberbayern
- District: Rosenheim
- Municipal assoc.: Breitbrunn am Chiemsee

Government
  - Mayor (2020–26): Anton Baumgartner

Area
  - Total: 8.12 km^{2} (3.14 sq mi)
- Elevation: 536 m (1,759 ft)

Population (2025-12-31)
  - Total: 1,439
  - Density: 177/km^{2} (459/sq mi)
- Time zone: UTC+01:00 (CET)
  - Summer (DST): UTC+02:00 (CEST)
- Postal codes: 83254
- Dialling codes: 08054
- Vehicle registration: RO
- Website: www.vg-breitbrunn.de

Breitbrunn am Chiemsee (German pronunciation: [ˈbʁaɪtbʁʊn ʔam ˈkiːmzeː], lit. 'Breitbrunn on the Chiemsee') is a municipality in the district of Rosenheim in Bavaria in Germany.
