= Edling (surname) =

Edling is a Swedish surname. Notable people with the surname include:

- Dina Edling (1854–1935), Swedish opera singer
- Leif Edling (born 1963), songwriter and bass player of the Swedish doom metal band Candlemass
- Rolf Edling (born 1943), Swedish fencer
