= Gstadt am Chiemsee =

Gstadt a.Chiemsee
- Municipality
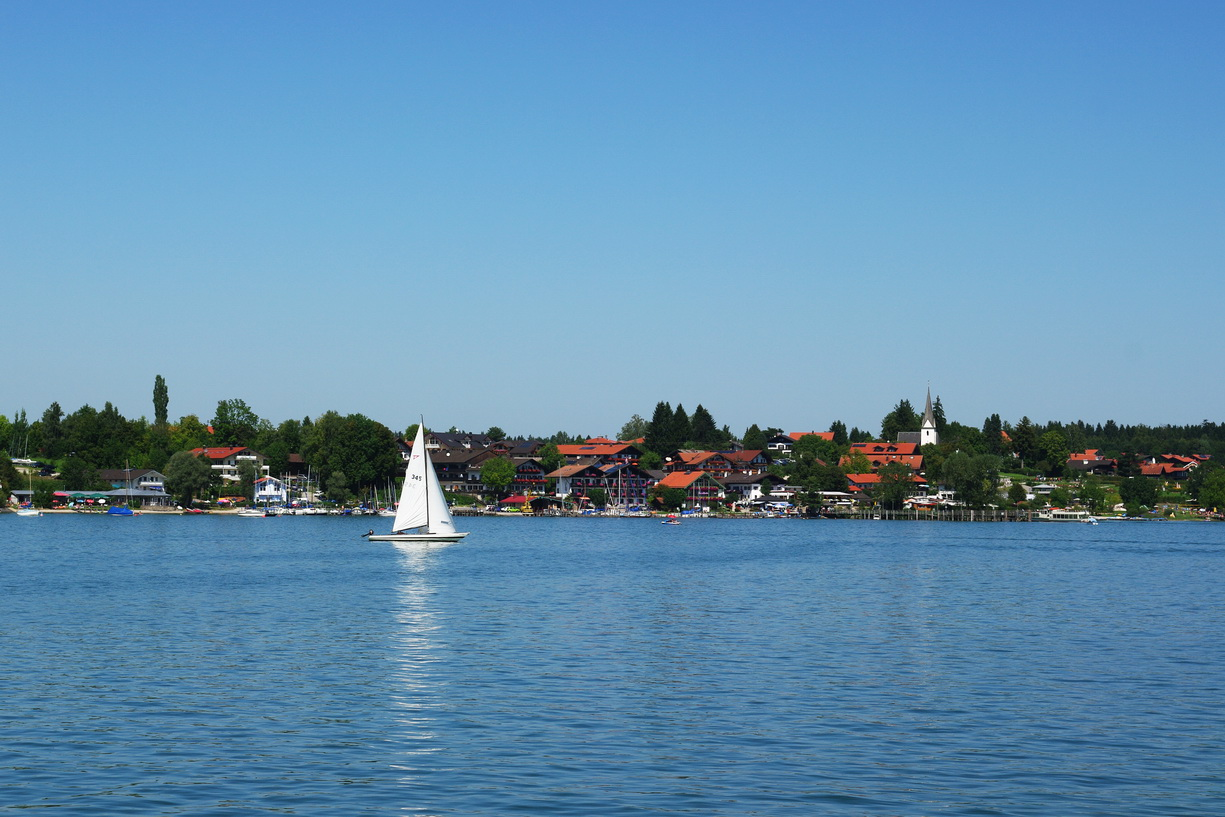
- Gstadt am Chiemsee

- Coat of arms

- Location of Gstadt a.Chiemsee within Rosenheim district
- Interactive map of Gstadt a.Chiemsee
- Location within Germany Location within Bavaria
- Coordinates: 47°53′N 12°25′E
- Country: Germany
- State: Bavaria
- Admin. region: Oberbayern
- District: Rosenheim
- Municipal assoc.: Breitbrunn am Chiemsee

Government
  - Mayor (2020–26): Bernhard Hainz (FW)

Area
  - Total: 10.7 km^{2} (4.1 sq mi)
- Elevation: 538 m (1,765 ft)

Population (2025-12-31)
  - Total: 1,141
  - Density: 107/km^{2} (276/sq mi)
- Time zone: UTC+01:00 (CET)
  - Summer (DST): UTC+02:00 (CEST)
- Postal codes: 83257
- Dialling codes: 08054
- Vehicle registration: RO
- Website: www.gstadt.de

Gstadt am Chiemsee (German pronunciation: [ˈkʃtat ʔam ˈkiːmzeː], lit. 'Gstadt on the Chiemsee') is a municipality and a village in the district of Rosenheim, Bavaria, Germany. It is located on Lake Chiemsee.

== Municipal parts ==
municipal parts are

- Gollenshausen
- Gstadt
- Aich
- Aiglsbuch
- Aisching
- Ed
- Lienzing
- Lienzinger Moos
- Loiberting
- Mitterndorf
- Plötzing
- Preinersdorf
- Schalchen
- Söll
- Weingarten

== History ==
Gstadt am Chiemsee belonged to the monastery of Frauenchiemsee. After the administrative reform of Bavaria in 1818 it became a municipality. The earliest evidence of settlements, such as commodities or remains of lake dwellings, point to the Stone and Bronze Age from 5000 - 500 BC. The findings can be viewed in Bedaium Museum in Seebruck and Museum in Traunstein. In the Middle Ages, Bavarians from the Elbe river area settled in the region. Gstadt is located on the north side of lake Chiemsee, the largest lake in Bavaria (84 km^{2}), and is also called "Bayerisches Meer" (Bavarian Sea). Gstadt (original name "Gestadte") located in the "Chiemgau" region (a former Roman province of Noricum) was first documented in 1168 and was the departure point for boats crossing to the monastery of Frauenchiemsee. Later in the 19th century, the town was frequently visited by poets, writers and painters arriving on stagecoaches from Munich on their way to the islands. Through the centuries Gstadt remained loyal to agriculture and started to cater to tourism after World War II.
