= Riedering =

- Municipality
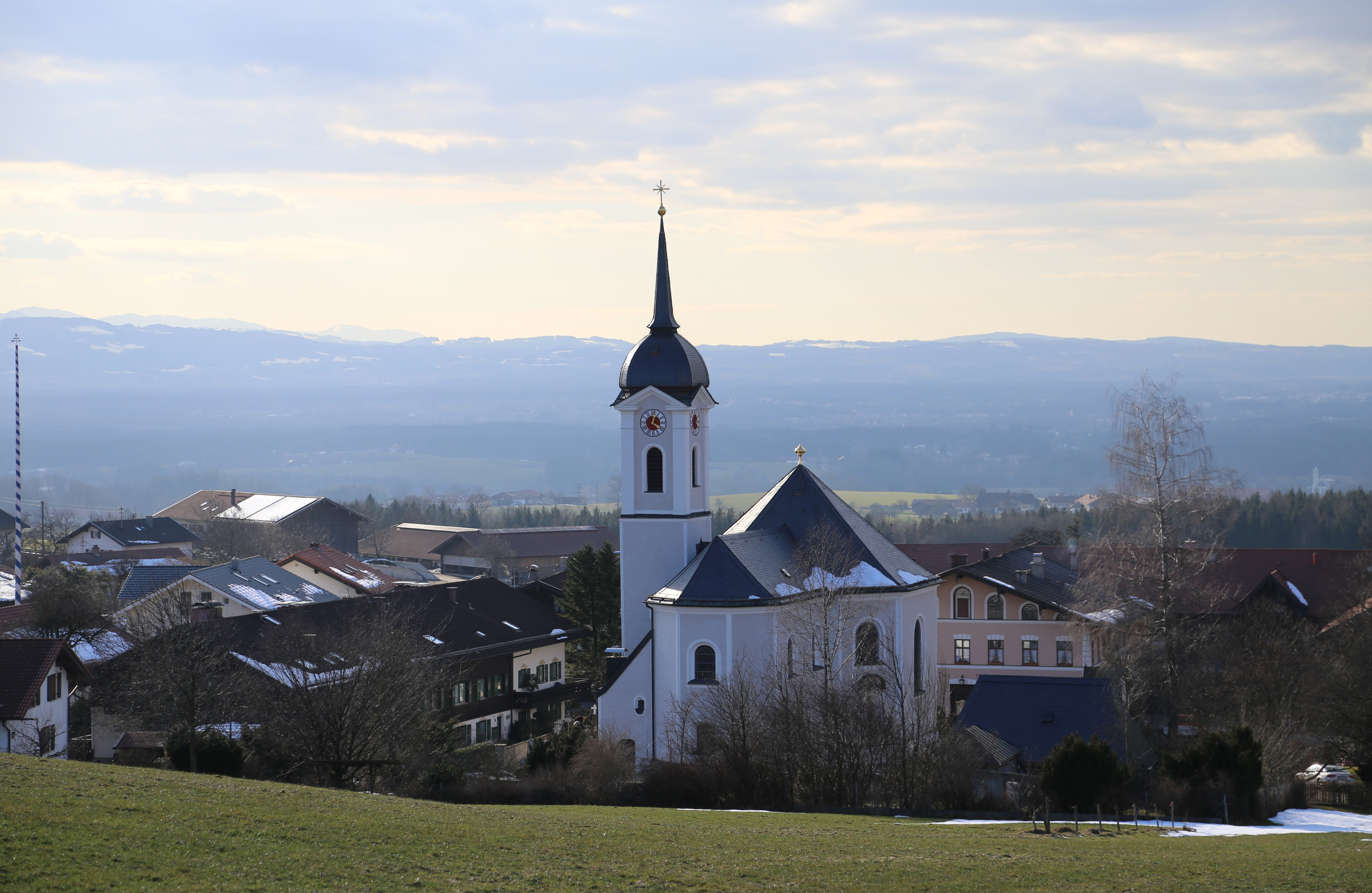
- Church of Saints Rupert and Martin in Söllhuben

- Coat of arms

- Location of Riedering within Rosenheim district
- Interactive map of Riedering
- Location within Germany Location within Bavaria
- Coordinates: 47°50′N 12°12′E
- Country: Germany
- State: Bavaria
- Admin. region: Oberbayern
- District: Rosenheim

Government
  - Mayor (2020–26): Christoph Vodermaier

Area
  - Total: 37.95 km^{2} (14.65 sq mi)
- Elevation: 493 m (1,617 ft)

Population (2025-12-31)
  - Total: 5,623
  - Density: 148.2/km^{2} (383.8/sq mi)
- Time zone: UTC+01:00 (CET)
  - Summer (DST): UTC+02:00 (CEST)
- Postal codes: 83083
- Dialling codes: 08036
- Vehicle registration: RO
- Website: www.riedering.de

Riedering (German pronunciation: [ˈʁiːdəʁɪŋ]) is a municipality in the district of Rosenheim in Bavaria in Germany.
