= Söchtenau =

- Municipality
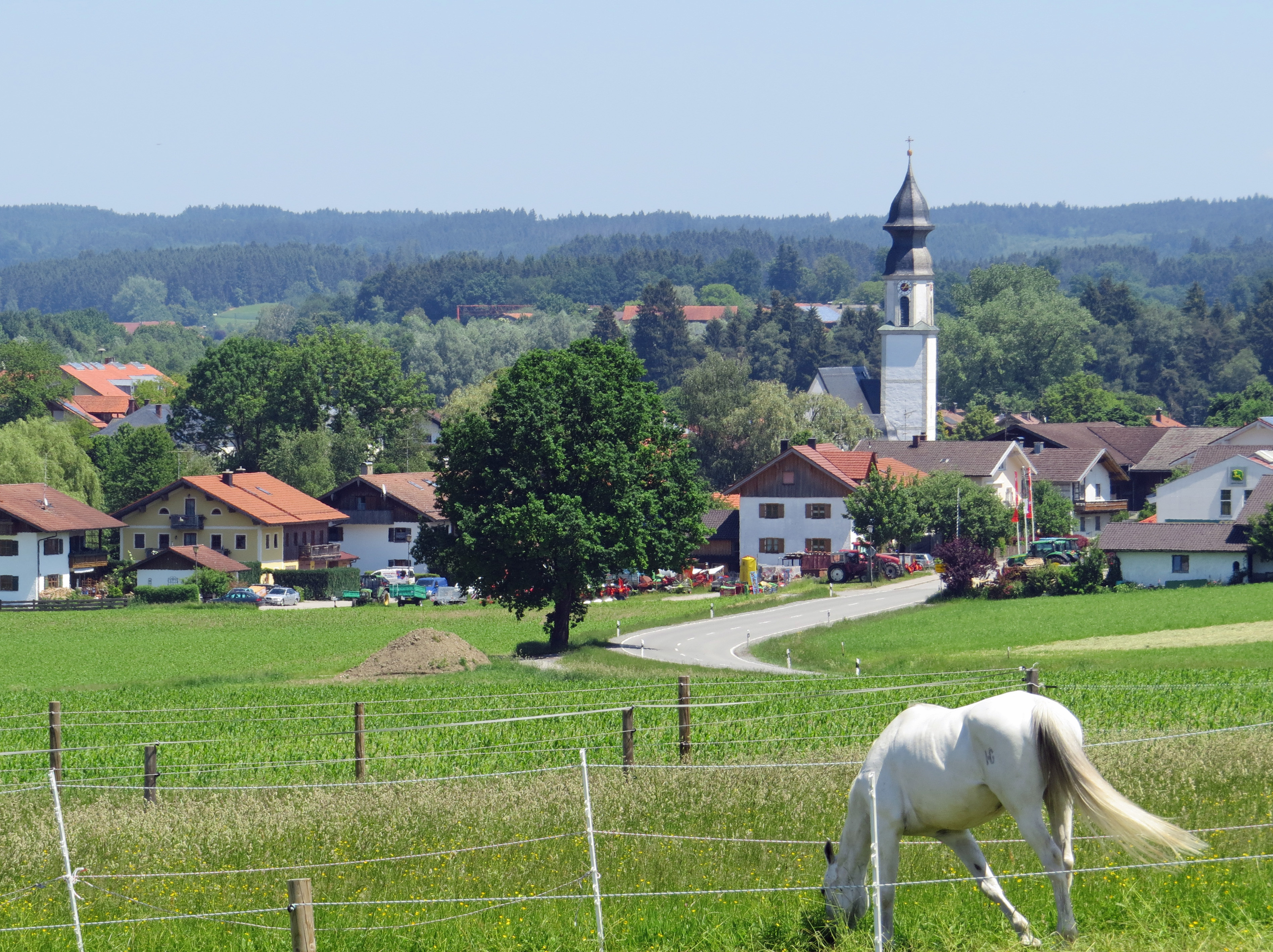
- Söchtenau seen from the southwest

- Coat of arms

- Location of Söchtenau within Rosenheim district
- Interactive map of Söchtenau
- Location within Germany Location within Bavaria
- Coordinates: 47°56′N 12°14′E
- Country: Germany
- State: Bavaria
- Admin. region: Oberbayern
- District: Rosenheim

Government
  - Mayor (2020–26): Bernhard Summerer

Area
  - Total: 25.62 km^{2} (9.89 sq mi)
- Elevation: 480 m (1,570 ft)

Population (2025-12-31)
  - Total: 2,676
  - Density: 104.4/km^{2} (270.5/sq mi)
- Time zone: UTC+01:00 (CET)
  - Summer (DST): UTC+02:00 (CEST)
- Postal codes: 83139
- Dialling codes: 08055
- Vehicle registration: RO
- Website: www.soechtenau.de

Söchtenau (German pronunciation: [ˈzœçtənaʊ]) is a municipality in the district of Rosenheim in Bavaria in Germany.
