= Rosenheim (district) =

Coordinates: 47°55′N 12°10′E

Landkreis Rosenheim
- District
- Flag Coat of arms
- Country: Germany
- State: Bavaria
- Adm. region: Upper Bavaria
- Capital: Rosenheim

Government
  - District admin.: Otto Lederer (CSU)

Area
  - Total: 1,439.4 km^{2} (555.8 sq mi)

Population (31 December 2025)
  - Total: 258,824
  - Density: 179.81/km^{2} (465.72/sq mi)
- Time zone: UTC+01:00 (CET)
  - Summer (DST): UTC+02:00 (CEST)
- Vehicle registration: RO
- Website: landkreis-rosenheim.de

Rosenheim is a Landkreis (district) in the south of Bavaria, Germany. Neighboring districts are, clockwise from the west, Miesbach, Munich, Ebersberg, Mühldorf, and Traunstein, with the Austrian province Tirol across the southern border. The district entirely surrounds the city of Rosenheim, which is independently administered but hosts the district's administration; both the city and the district share the "RO" designation for their license plates.

== History ==
The district was created in 1972 when the former districts Rosenheim, Bad Aibling, and parts of Wasserburg am Inn were merged.

== Geography ==
The Rosenheim district is located in the foothills of the Alps, the Chiemgau. The landscape is dominated by moraines created by the Inn Glacier in the last glacial period, including many lakes. To the east of the district is the largest of these lakes, the Chiemsee. The main rivers in the district are the Inn and the Mangfall, which meet in the city of Rosenheim.

Mountain ranges in the south of the district include the Chiemgauer Alpen and the Mangfallgebirge, which also contains the Wendelstein, at 1,838 metres (6,030 ft), the highest elevation in the district.

== Coat of arms ==
The coat of arms includes the distinctive Bavarian fusilly pattern at the top. The crossed leaves of the water lily on the left are taken from the Frauenchiemsee coat of arms, symbolizing the Chiemsee area of the district, and the red lion represents the city of Wasserburg. The coat of arms was granted in 1976.

== Towns and municipalities ==
Clickable map of towns and municipalities in the district

Towns
1. Bad Aibling
2. Kolbermoor
3. Wasserburg am Inn

Markt

1. Bad Endorf
2. Bruckmühl
3. Neubeuern
4. Prien am Chiemsee
Municipalities
1. Amerang
2. Aschau im Chiemgau
3. Babensham
4. Bad Feilnbach
5. Bernau am Chiemsee
6. Brannenburg
7. Edling
8. Eggstätt
9. Eiselfing
10. Feldkirchen-Westerham
11. Flintsbach
12. Frasdorf
13. Griesstätt
14. Großkarolinenfeld
15. Kiefersfelden

16. Nußdorf am Inn
17. Oberaudorf
18. Prutting
19. Raubling
20. Riedering
21. Rimsting
22. Rohrdorf
23. Samerberg
24. Schechen
25. Söchtenau
26. Soyen
27. Stephanskirchen
28. Tuntenhausen
29. Vogtareuth

Verwaltungsgemeinschaften
1. Breitbrunn am Chiemsee; 1. Breitbrunn am Chiemsee^{1}; 2. Chiemsee; 3. Gstadt am Chiemsee	2. Halfing; 1. Halfing^{1}; 2. Höslwang; 3. Schonstett	3. Pfaffing; 1. Albaching; 2. Pfaffing^{1}	4. Rott am Inn; 1. Ramerberg; 2. Rott am Inn^{1}
^{1}seat of the Verwaltungsgemeinschaft
