= Krautinsel =

Island in Chiemsee lake, Bavaria, Germany

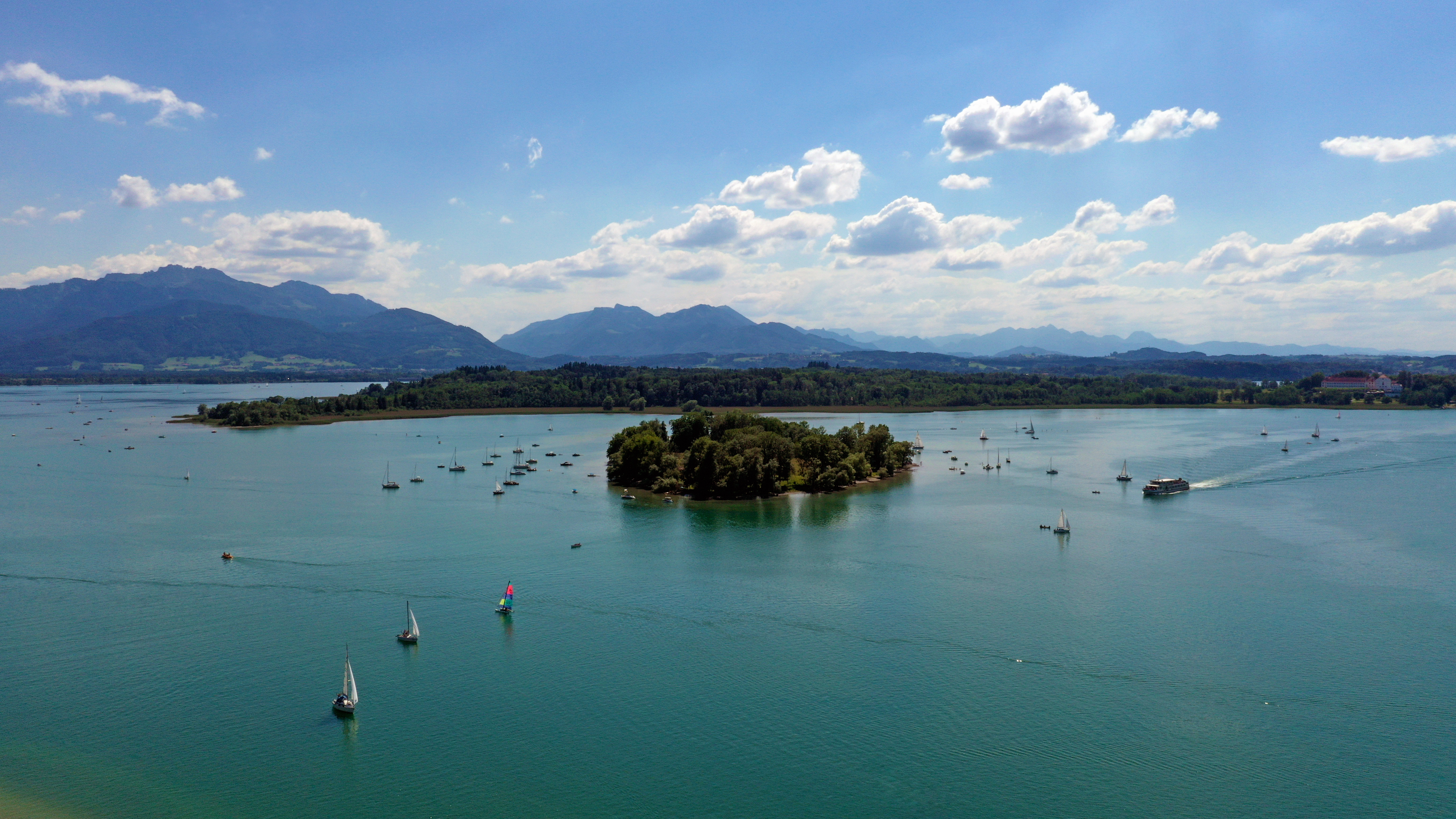

- Location within Bavaria

Geography
- Location: Chiemsee
- Coordinates: 47°52′6″N 12°24′59″E
- Area: 3.5 ha (8.6 acres)
- Length: 366 m (1201 ft)
- Width: 171 m (561 ft)

Administration
- Germany
- State: Bavaria
- District: Rosenheim
- Municipality: Chiemsee

Krautinsel is an island located in Chiemsee lake. With an area of 3.5 hectares, it is the smallest of the three islands in the Chiemsee (apart from the tiny artificial island of Schalch west of Frauenchiemsee, a.k.a. Fraueninsel). The island received its name because vegetables and herbs were grown there in the Middle Ages. Politically, it belongs to the municipality of Chiemsee in the Rosenheim district.

Two nameless small islands 54 and 80 meters south of the herb island form its southern foothills. They are connected to one another by a gravel bank. They each have only a few square meters of space and only offer space for one tree or shrub. These foothills no longer belong to the municipality of Chiemsee like the herb island, but to the unincorporated area of Chiemsee in the district of Traunstein.

== Usage ==
In contrast to the neighboring island of Frauenchiemsee, Krautinsel is uninhabited. In summer it serves as pasture for the cattle of the farmers around Chiemsee. In autumn the cattle are brought back to the mainland by ship. In the Middle Ages, nuns from the Frauenwörth Benedictine convent (Frauenchiemsee) grew vegetables and herbs on the herb island.

== Finds from the Stone Age ==
Traces of Neolithic settlement were found on the herb island for the first time in 1930. Follow-up examinations from 1993 onwards also brought stone tools from the Paleolithic to light. Among the finds are knives, blades and arrowheads made of flint, flat hatchets made of stone and a flat hatchet made of copper.

== See also ==
- List of islands of Germany
