= Herreninsel =

Island in Bavaria's largest lake, the Chiemsee

Coordinates: 47°51′45″N 12°23′51″E

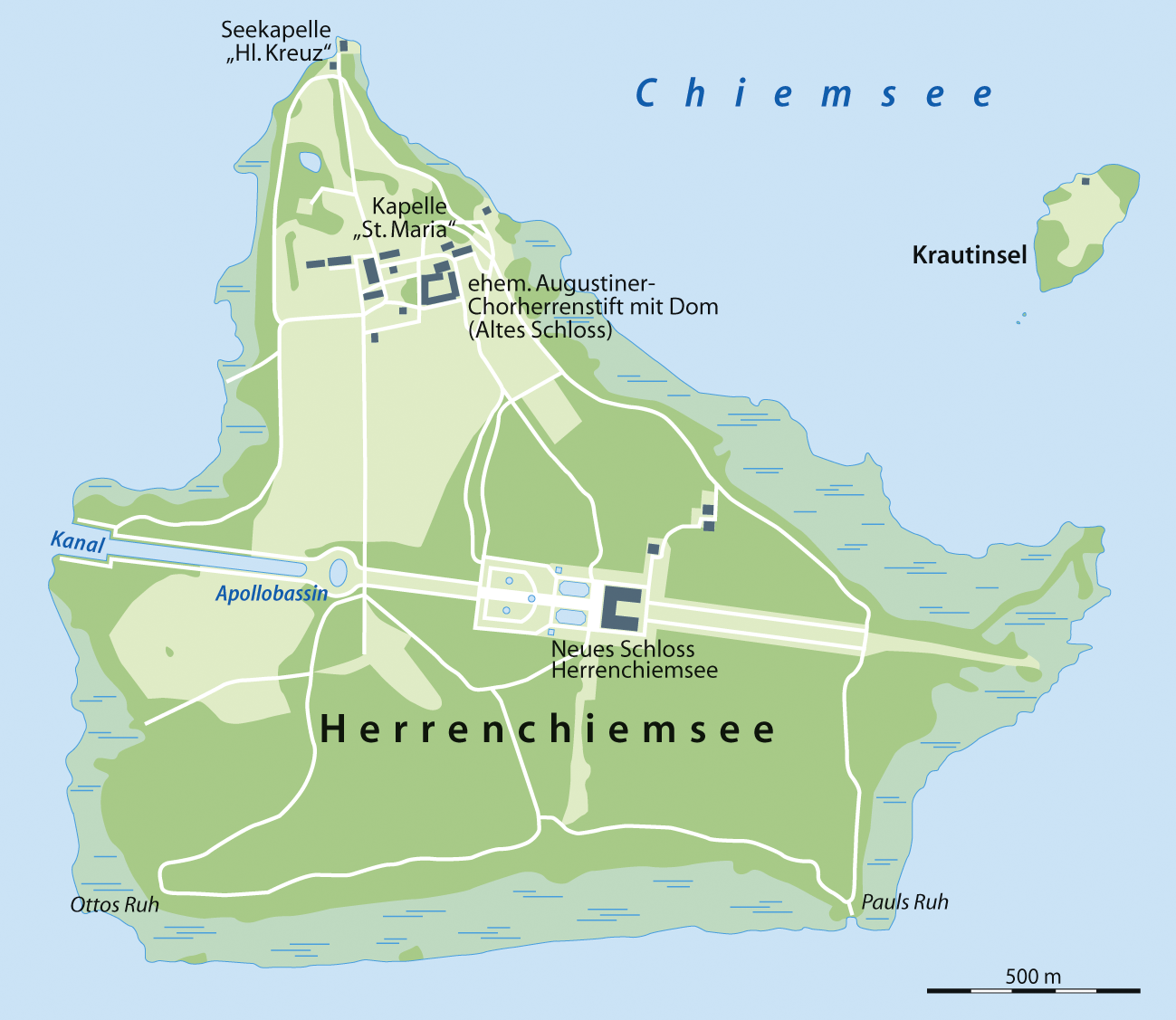
Map

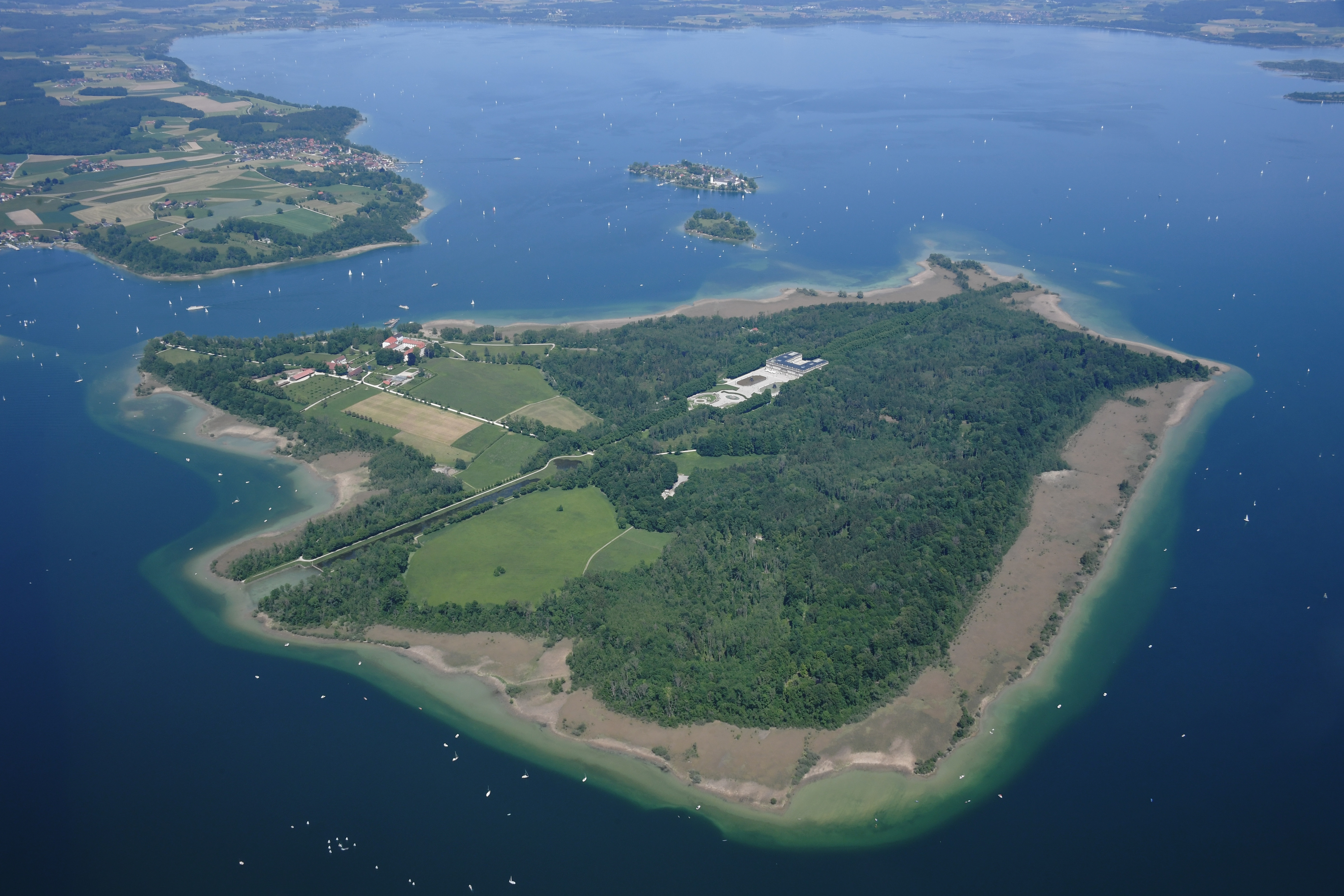
Aerial image of the Herreninsel

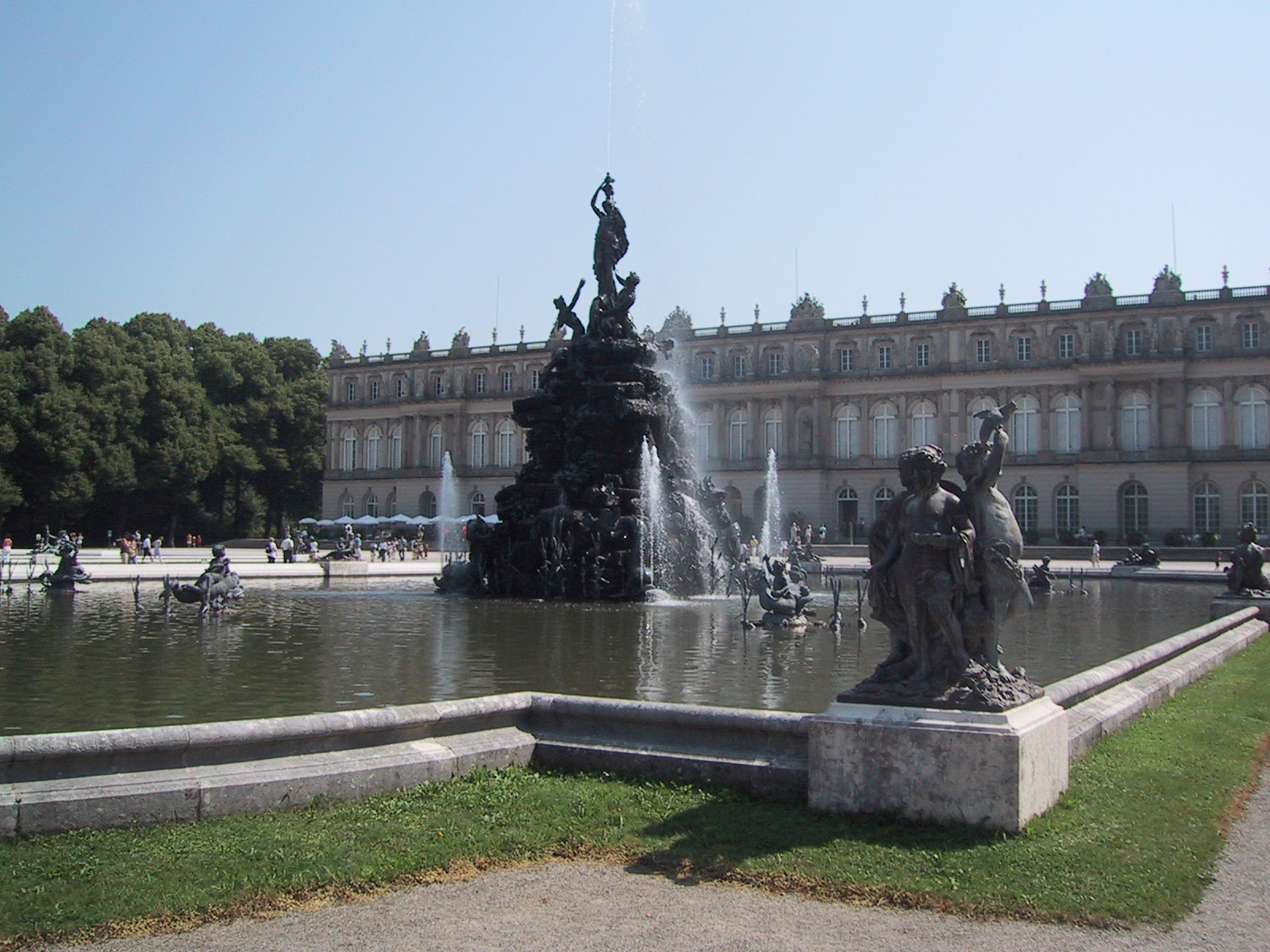
Schloss Herrenchiemsee

Herreninsel (German pronunciation: [ˈhɛʁənˌʔɪnzl̩]; old name: Herrenwörth) is a 238 hectare island in Bavaria's largest lake, Chiemsee. It is the biggest of the lake's three main islands, Fraueninsel and Krautinsel joining it to form the municipality of Chiemsee.

Herreninsel is famous for the Herrenchiemsee palace of Ludwig II of Bavaria. Never completed, it was only inhabited by the king for nine or ten nights before he mysteriously died of drowning at age 40.

The island is inhabited by about 30 people, Frauenchiemsee some 300. It is also the site of a previous royal home, the Old Palace Herrenchiemsee, a former Augustinian monastery (Monastery Herrenchiemsee).

The island can be reached all year round by the Chiemsee-Schifffahrt liner, by water taxi or by private boat (mainly from Gstadt and Prien as well as from Fraueninsel). The island is car-free. In the summer months, paid horse-drawn carriages shuttle visitors between the jetty and the castle.
