= Monastery of Chiemsee =

Monastery of Chiemsee may refer to:

- Frauenchiemsee, monastery for women founded around 782 on an island in Chiemsee lake
- Herrenchiemsee, Benedictine monastery for men founded around 765 on an island in Chiemsee lake, later an Augustinian canonry
