= List of islands of Germany =

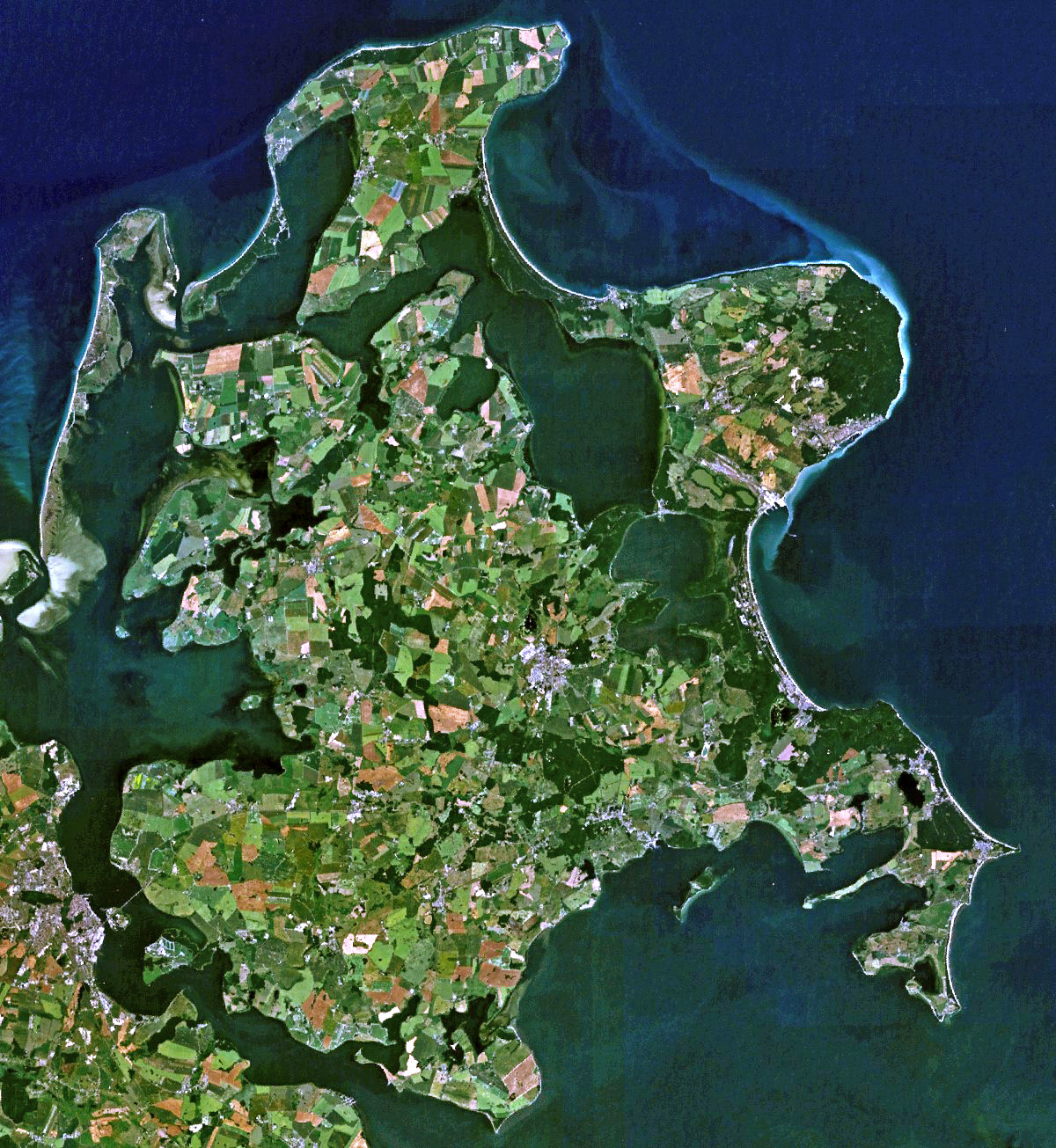
Satellite photograph of Rügen

This is a list of all offshore islands that belong to Germany, which are found in the North and Baltic Seas. In addition, some islands in inland waters are also listed.

== Largest islands ==
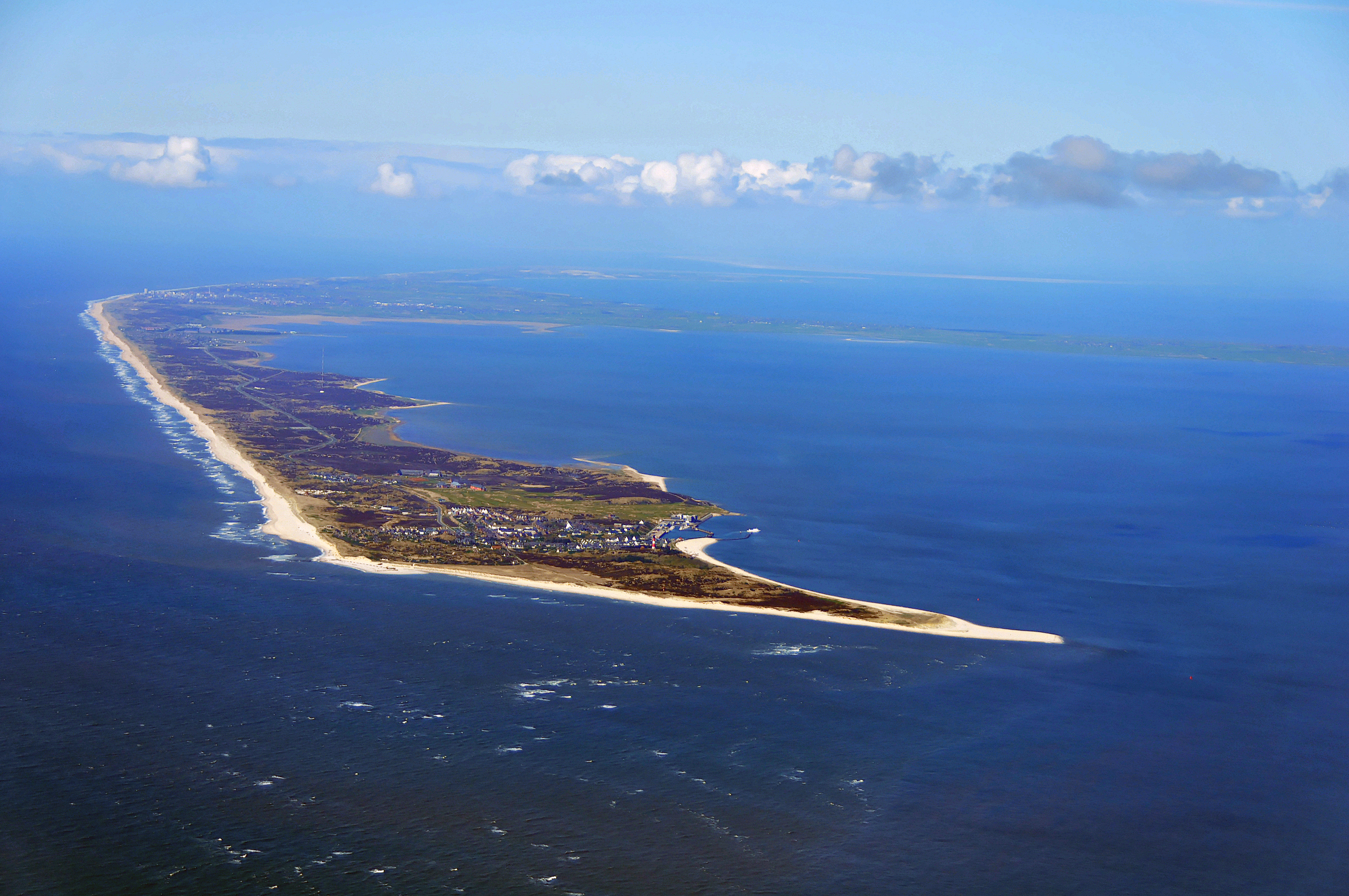
Sylt

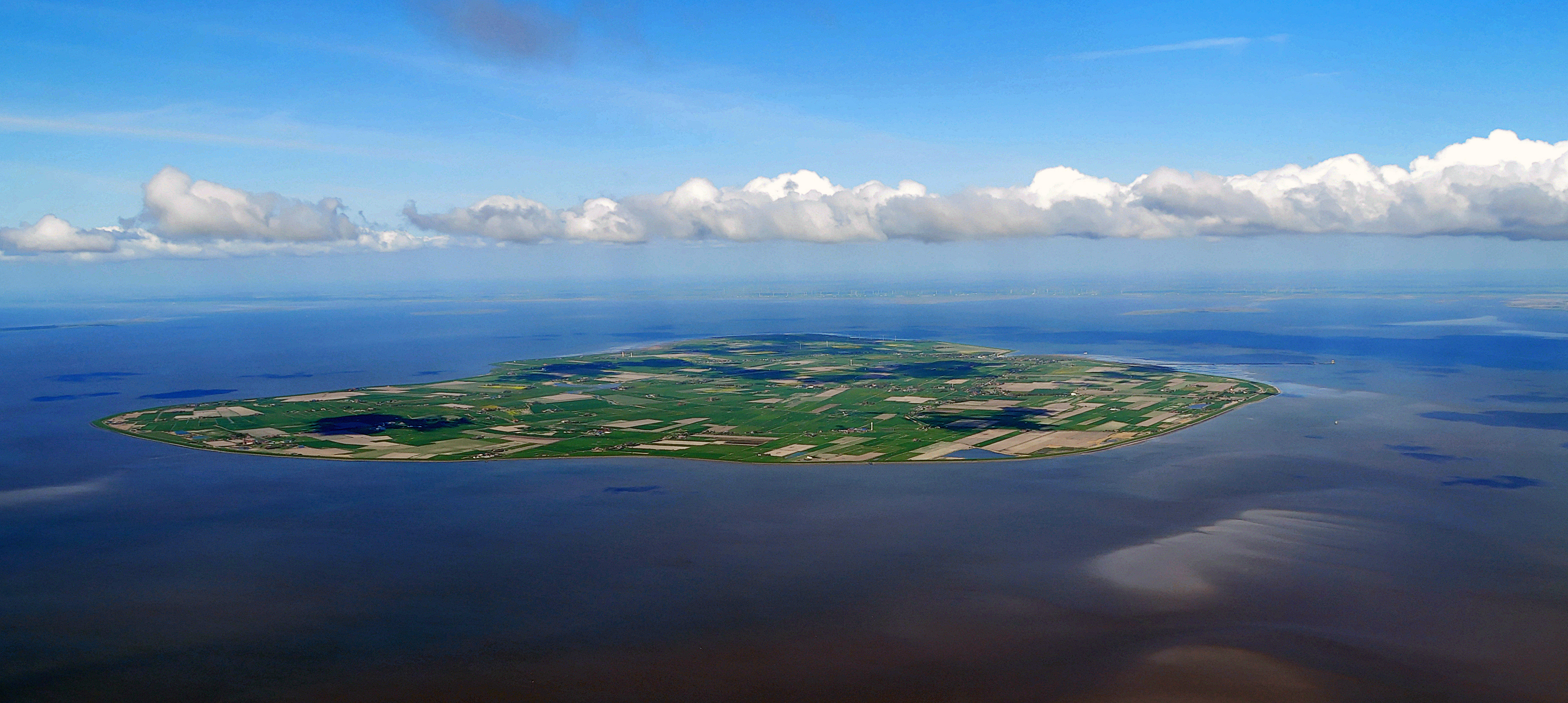
Pellworm

Largest islands of Germany
#	Island	Sea	Federal State	Area (km^{2})
1	Rügen	Baltic	Mecklenburg-Vorpommern	926
2	Usedom	Baltic	Mecklenburg-Vorpommern	373 (445 km^{2}^{[a]})
3	Fehmarn	Baltic	Schleswig-Holstein	185
4	Sylt	North Sea	Schleswig-Holstein	99
5	Föhr	North Sea	Schleswig-Holstein	82
6	Pellworm	North Sea	Schleswig-Holstein	37
7	Poel	Baltic	Mecklenburg-Vorpommern	36
8	Borkum	North Sea	Niedersachsen	31
9	Norderney	North Sea	Niedersachsen	26
10	Amrum	North Sea	Schleswig-Holstein	20.46

^a 72 km^{2} are part of Poland

== Islands of the Baltic Sea ==
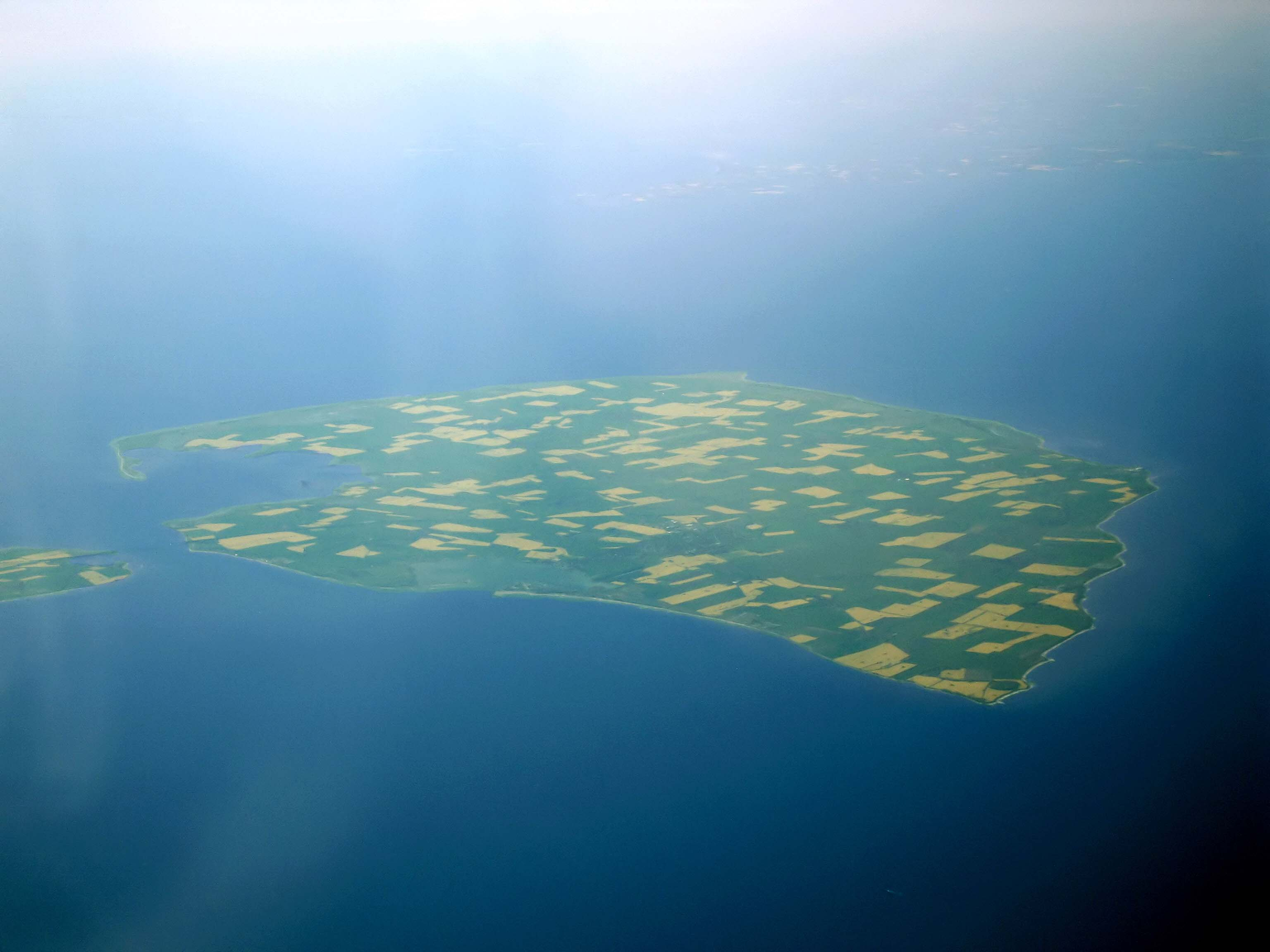
Fehmarn

- Fehmarn
- Poel
- Walfisch island
- Langenwerder
- Hiddensee
- Rügen
- Dänholm
- Vilm
- Greifswalder Oie
- Ruden
- Ummanz
- Usedom (partly belonging to Poland)

== Islands of the North Sea ==
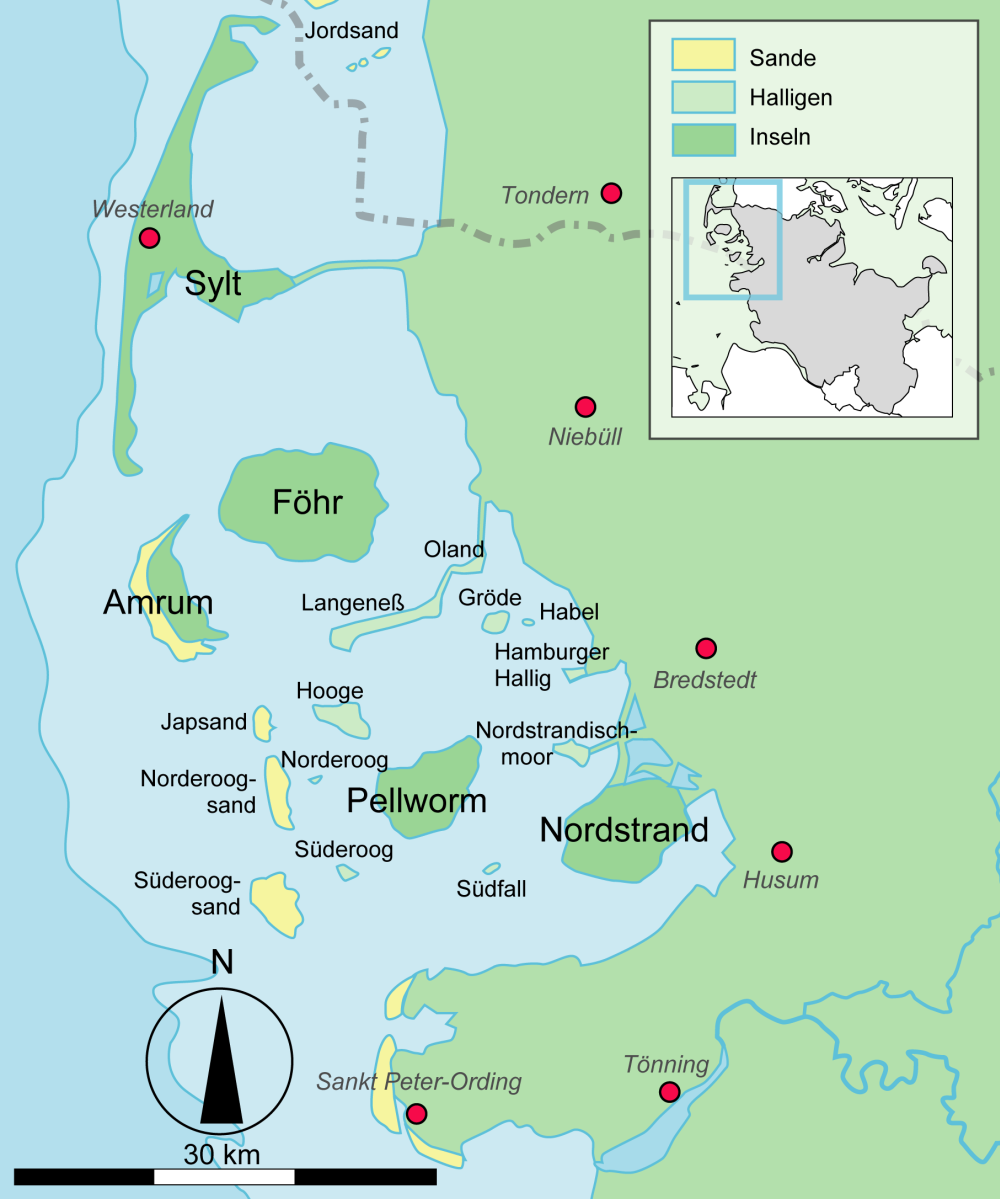
The North Frisian Islands

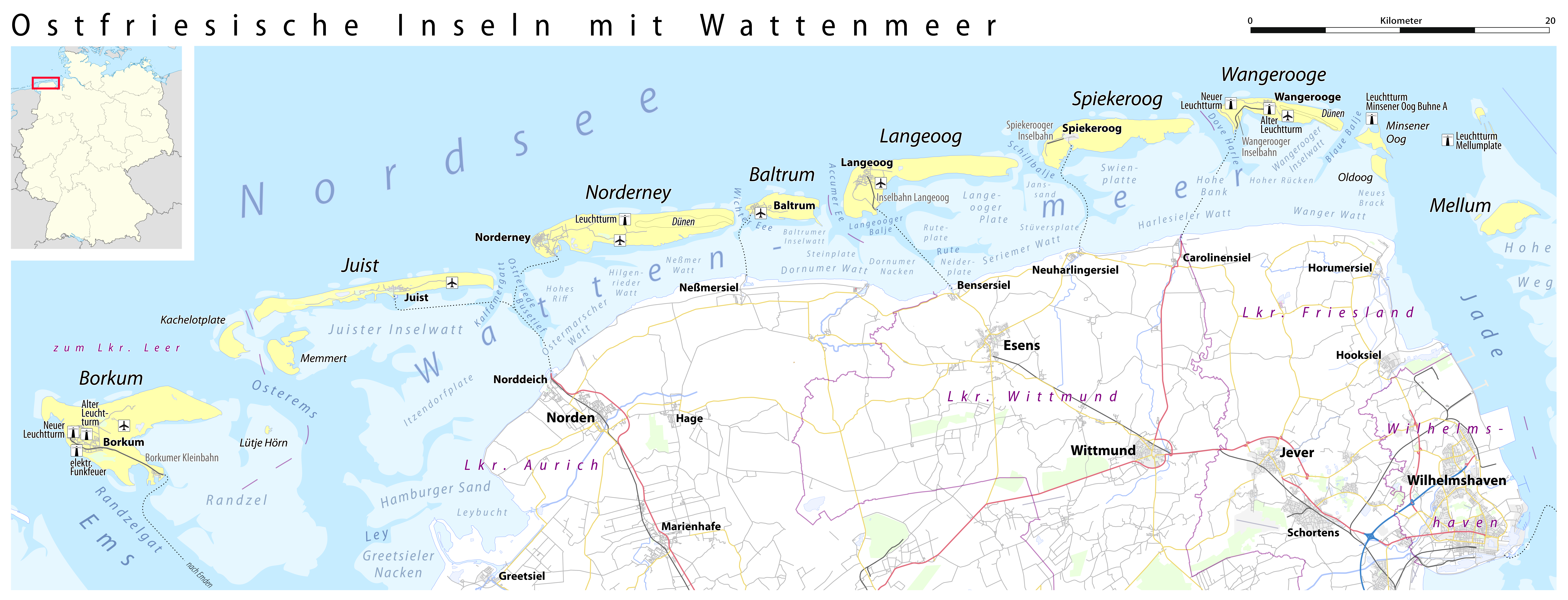
The East Frisian Islands

- Heligoland
- East Frisian Islands (in the Wadden Sea)
  - Borkum
  - Buise (former island, disappeared)
  - Lütje Hörn
  - Kachelotplate
  - Memmert
  - Juist
  - Norderney
  - Baltrum
  - Langeoog
  - Spiekeroog
  - Wangerooge
  - Mellum
- Neuwerk
- Scharhörn
- Nigehörn
- Trischen
- North Frisian Islands
  - Sylt
  - Föhr
  - Amrum
  - Pellworm
  - Nordstrand (former island, now peninsula)
- Halligen (also part of North Frisian Islands)
  - Langeneß
  - Norderoog
  - Süderoog
  - Nordstrandischmoor
  - Oland (German island)
  - Südfall
  - Gröde-Appelland
  - Hooge
  - Hallig Habel
  - Hamburger Hallig

== Islands of Elbe River ==
- Lühesand

== Islands of Weser River ==
- Harriersand

== Islands of Lake Constance ==
- Mainau Island
- Reichenau Island
- Lindau

== Islands of Chiemsee ==
- Herrenchiemsee
- Frauenchiemsee
- Krautinsel

== See also ==
- Weiße Insel des Südens
- List of islands in the Baltic Sea
- List of islands
