= Chiemsee (municipality) =

- Municipality
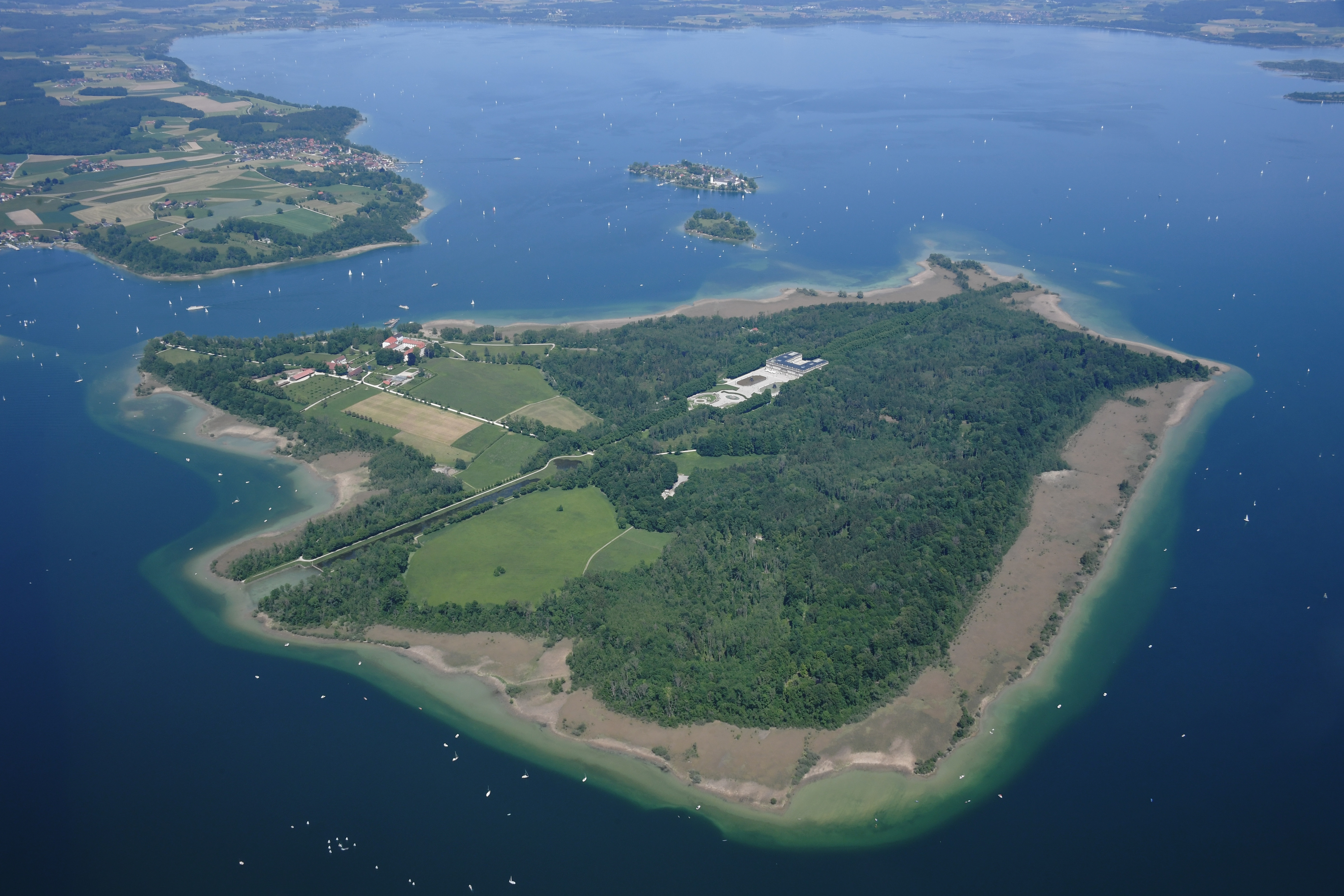
- Aerial image of the Chiemsee municipality with the islands Frauenchiemsee, Krautinsel, and Herrenchiemsee (from top to bottom)

- Coat of arms

- Location of Chiemsee within Rosenheim district
- Interactive map of Chiemsee
- Location within Germany Location within Bavaria
- Coordinates: 47°52′N 12°25′E
- Country: Germany
- State: Bavaria
- Admin. region: Oberbayern
- District: Rosenheim
- Municipal assoc.: Breitbrunn am Chiemsee

Government
  - Mayor (2020–26): Armin Krämmer (FW)

Area
  - Total: 2.57 km^{2} (0.99 sq mi)
- Elevation: 523 m (1,716 ft)

Population (2025-12-31)
  - Total: 141
  - Density: 54.9/km^{2} (142/sq mi)
- Time zone: UTC+01:00 (CET)
  - Summer (DST): UTC+02:00 (CEST)
- Postal codes: 83256
- Dialling codes: 08054
- Vehicle registration: RO
- Website: www.vg-breitbrunn.de

Chiemsee (German pronunciation: [ˈkiːmzeː]) is a municipality in the district of Rosenheim in Bavaria in Germany, named after the lake Chiemsee. It is Bavaria's smallest municipality by area and the second smallest (after Balderschwang) by population.

The municipal area comprises not the lake itself but the islands of Herrenchiemsee (Herreninsel) with its Palaces, Frauenchiemsee and the uninhabited Krautinsel. While the island of Herrenchiemsee with 2.38 km^{2} (0.92 sq mi) is by far the largest, most of Chiemsee's inhabitants live on 0.15 km^{2} (0.058 sq mi) Frauenchiemsee.
