= Harriersand =

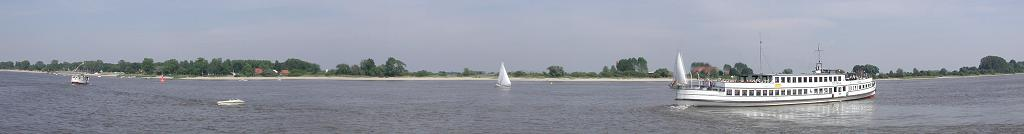

- Location within Germany

Geography
- Location: Weser
- Coordinates: 53°18′N 8°30′E
- Area: 6 km^{2} (2.3 sq mi)
- Length: 11 km (6.8 mi)

Administration
- Germany

Demographics
- Population: 69 (2022)

Harriersand is a river island located in the lower reaches of the Weser in Lower Saxony, Germany.

Harriersand faces the town of Brake, but it has been part of the municipality of Schwanewede since 1 March 1974, following municipal reform, as it is more easily accessible from the eastern bank of the river. Since 1965, a bridge has connected the island to the mainland near the hamlet of Rade. Prior to 1974, Harriersand was administered by the town of Brake.

The island is approximately 11 km (6.8 mi) long and has an area of 6 km^{2} (2.3 sq mi), making it one of the longest river islands in Europe. In recent years, Harriersand has had a permanent population of around 70 residents, in addition to numerous holiday and weekend homes.

== See also ==
- List of islands of Germany
