= Herrenchiemsee =

Royal building complex in Bavaria, Germany

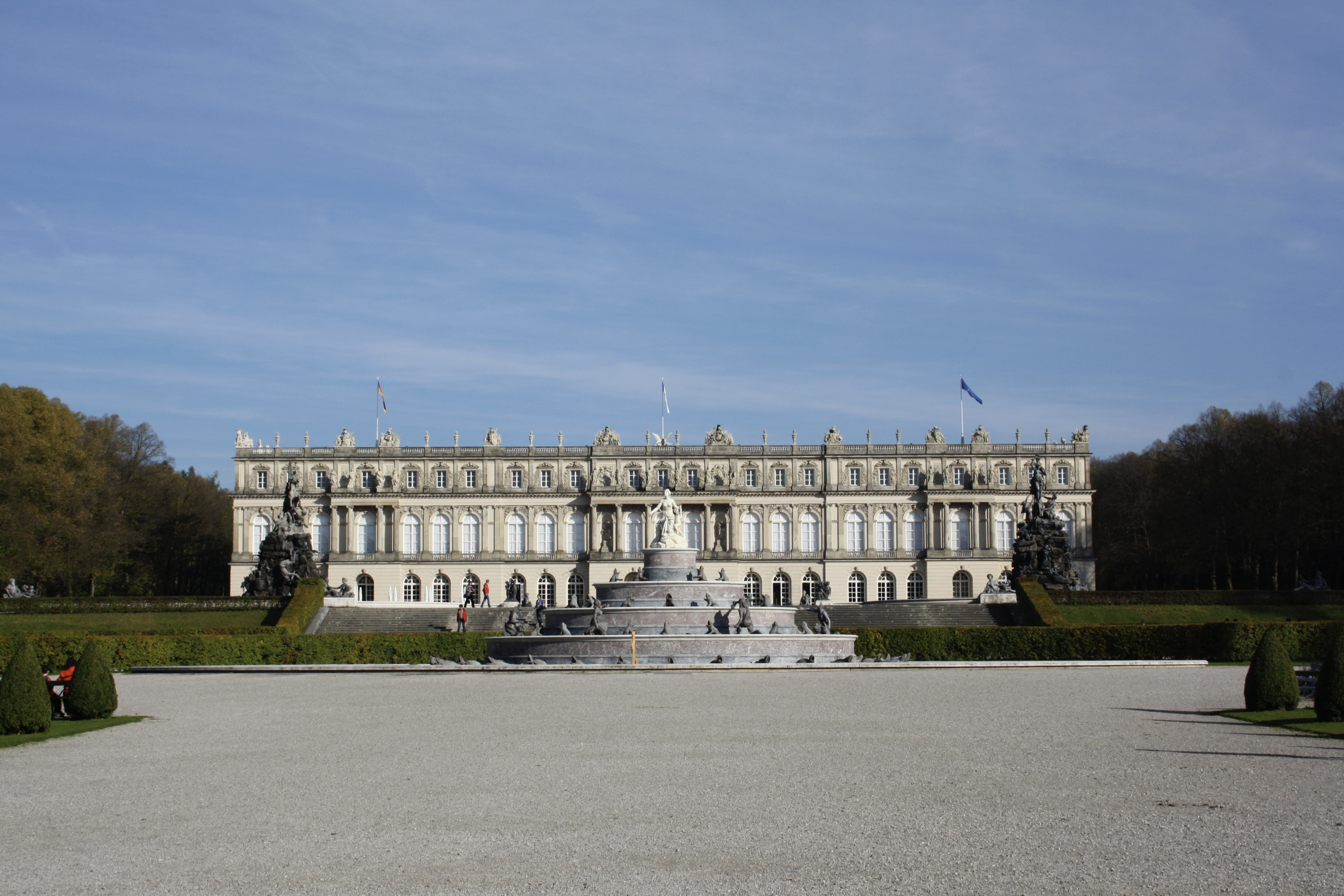
- New Palace from the West

General information
- Location: Herreninsel, Germany
- Coordinates: 47°51′38″N 12°23′53″E

UNESCO World Heritage Site
- Part of: The Palaces of King Ludwig II of Bavaria: Neuschwanstein, Linderhof, Schachen and Herrenchiemsee
- Criteria: Cultural: iv
- Reference: 1726-004
- Inscription: 2025 (47th Session)
- Area: 18 ha (44 acres)
- Buffer zone: 222 ha (550 acres)

Herrenchiemsee is a complex of royal buildings on Herreninsel, the largest island in the Chiemsee lake, in southern Bavaria, Germany. Together with the neighbouring isle of Frauenchiemsee and the uninhabited Krautinsel, it forms the municipality of Chiemsee, located about 60 kilometres (37 mi) southeast of Munich in the district of Rosenheim.

The island, formerly the site of an Augustinian monastery, was purchased by King Ludwig II of Bavaria in 1873. The king had the premises converted into a residence, known as the Old Palace (Altes Schloss). From 1878 onwards, he had the New Herrenchiemsee Palace (Neues Schloss) erected, based on the model of Versailles. It was the largest, but also the last of his building projects, and remained incomplete. Today maintained by the Bavarian Administration of State-Owned Palaces, Gardens and Lakes, Herrenchiemsee is accessible to the public and a major tourist attraction.

== Old Palace (Herrenchiemsee Abbey) ==
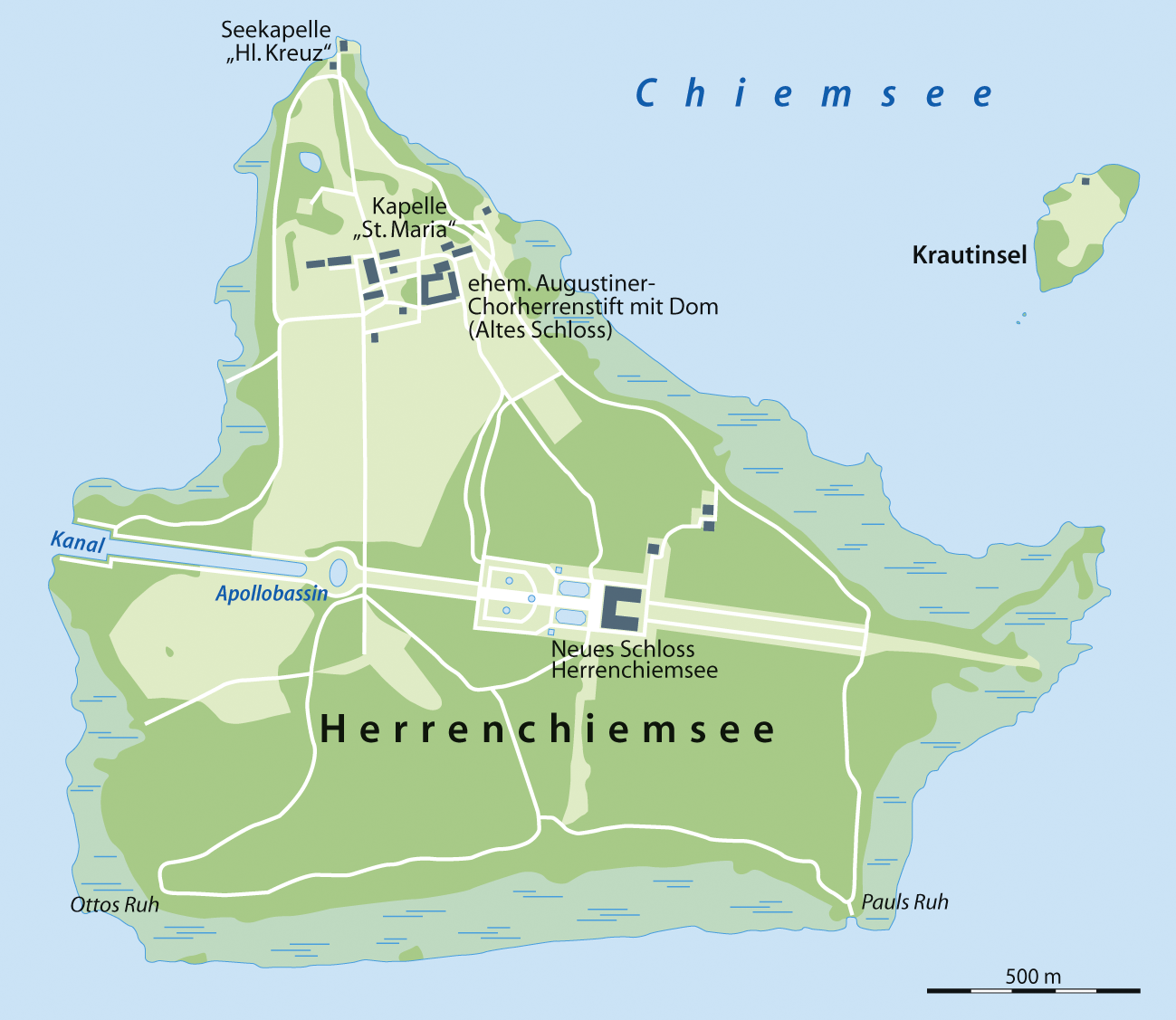
Map of the island with the Old and the New Palace

According to tradition, the Benedictine abbey of Herrenchiemsee was established about 765 AD by the Agilolfing duke Tassilo III of Bavaria at the northern tip of the Herreninsel. New findings however indicate an even earlier foundation between 620 and 629 by the Burgundian missionary Saint Eustace of Luxeuil, making it the oldest monastery in the Duchy of Bavaria, established some 70 years earlier than St Peter's Abbey in Salzburg.

In 969, Emperor Otto I consigned the abbey to the Archbishops of Salzburg. Initially a Benedictine monastery, Herrenchiemsee about 1130 was re-established as a convent of Canons regular living under the Rule of St. Augustine. The construction of a new Romanesque basilica, dedicated to Sts Sixtus and Sebastian, was completed in 1158.

In 1215, with the approval of Pope Innocent III, the Salzburg archbishop Eberhard von Regensburg made the monastery church the cathedral of a suffragan diocese in its own right, the Bishopric of Chiemsee, including several parishes on the mainland and in Tyrol. The Augustinian convent acted as cathedral chapter, while the auxiliary bishops retained their seat at the Chiemseehof palace in Salzburg. The Herrenchiemsee chapter was headed by provosts who from 1218 also held the position of an archdeacon. They even obtained pontifical vestments and the right of papal count palatines in the 15th century.

The present-day Baroque monastery complex was erected between 1642 and 1731. In the course of the German Mediatisation, Herrenchiemsee Abbey was secularised in 1803, the cathedral desecrated in 1807, and the Chiemsee diocese finally dissolved in 1808. The island was then sold; various owners demolished the cathedral, sold the interior, and even turned the abbey into a brewery. King Ludwig II of Bavaria warded off plans for the complete deforestation of the island by a Württemberg timber trade company by acquiring it in 1873. He had the leftover buildings converted for his private use, the complex that later became known as the "Old Palace", where he stayed surveying the construction of the New Herrenchiemsee Palace.

From 10 to 23 August 1948, the representatives of eleven German states of the Western Zones and West Berlin met at the Old Palace as the Verfassungskonvent (Constitutional Convention) to prepare the work for drafting the Basic Law (Grundgesetz) with a view to the founding of the Federal Republic of Germany.

== New Palace ==
=== Construction ===
In 1867, the young king Ludwig II had traveled to France but had to return to Bavaria when he heard of the death of his uncle Otto, without an opportunity to visit the Palace of Versailles. He nevertheless was concerned with the residence of King Louis XIV and had plans for a similar retreat drafted by his court architect Georg von Dollmann (1830–1895). A possible building site was chosen in the Graswang valley near Ettal, the later site of Linderhof Palace.

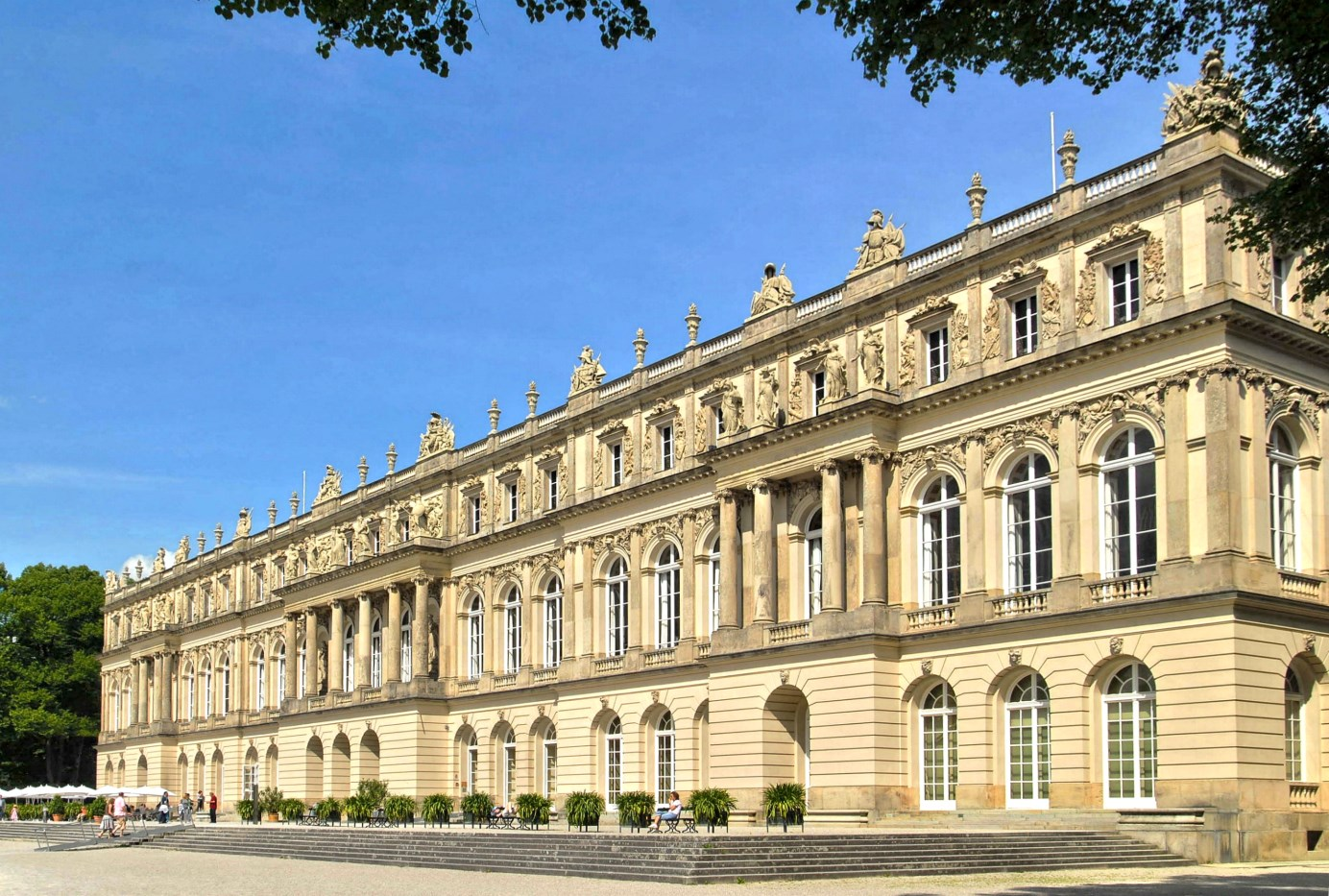
The garden façade

After several revisions, Dollmann's designs for a former pavilion resembling Grand Trianon or the Château de Marly had grown to a large palace, including a copy of the Versailles Hall of Mirrors. Construction was halted by the outbreak of the Franco-Prussian War in 1870. In the following years, Ludwig concentrated on construction of Linderhof. He resumed his former plans after finally visiting Versailles in summer 1874, being received with honors by the French government on his birthday on 25 August. Herrenchiemsee became the designated site for the large New Palace around a central corps de logis, designed by Dollmann, Christian Jank, and Franz von Seitz.

Construction began on 21 May 1878. Ludwig himself regularly supervised the building progress, while he stayed at the Old Place nearby. Meant as a homage to the adored King Louis XIV and his divine right, Herrenchiemsee arose as a private, yet vast residence, which resembled Versailles but was never designed to host a thousand-head royal household. Ludwig only had an opportunity to stay at the Palace for a few days in September 1885, with a handful of rooms richly decorated and the unfinished parts covered by colorful canvasses.

After the king's death in the following year, all construction work was discontinued. During the period between 1863 and 1886, 16,579,674 Marks were spent. Using a 0.2304 troy ounce (7.171 g) 1890 '20 Mark' gold coin as a benchmark, this equates to 190,998 oz of gold, which at October 2013 prices was worth approximately £154,000,000 (US$250,100,000), more than the total construction cost of Linderhof and Neuschwanstein Castle together. The expenses brought the royal finances to the verge of bankruptcy, though they had a strong stimulus on the local economy.

Only a few weeks after Ludwig's death the building was opened for the public. In 1907 the unfinished North Wing was demolished, whilst the corresponding South Wing was never built. After the November Revolution, Crown Prince Rupprecht ceded Herrenchiemsee to the State of Bavaria in 1923.

=== Architecture ===
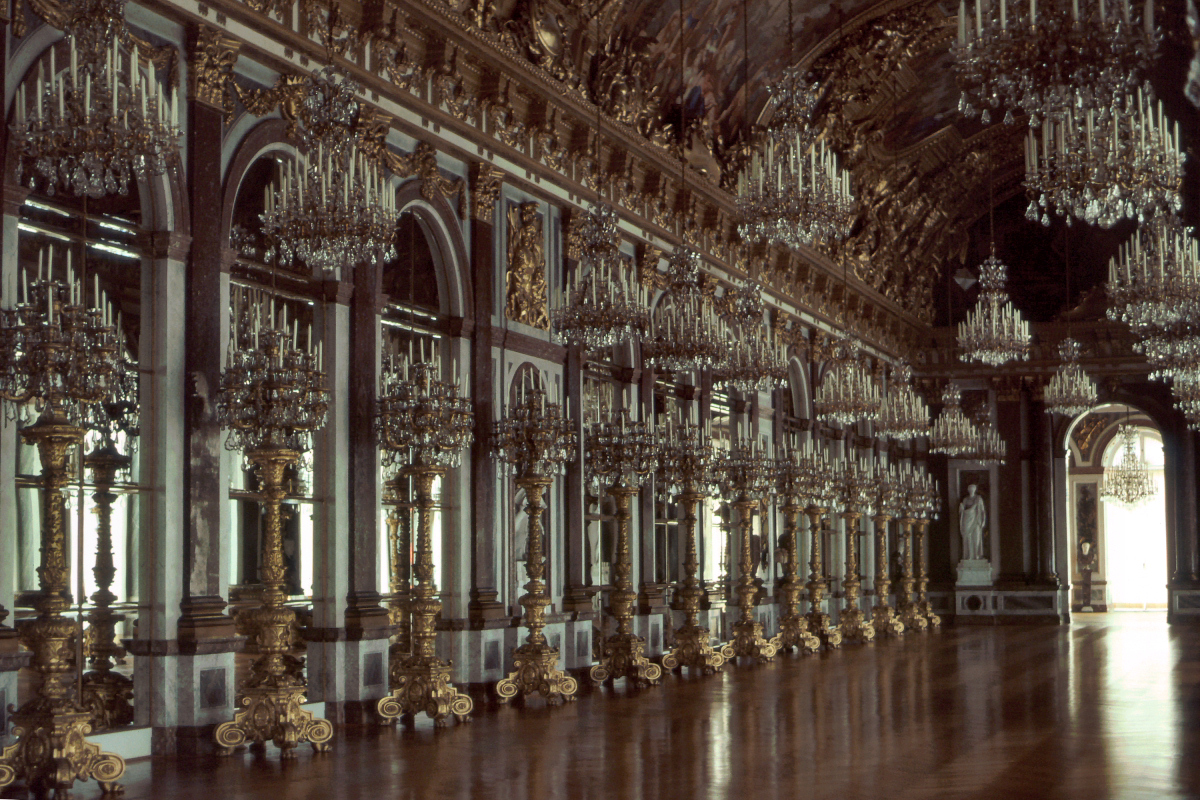
Spiegelgalerie ("Hall of Mirrors") at Herrenchiemsee

Unlike the medieval themed Neuschwanstein, begun in 1869, the Neo-Baroque New Palace stands as a monument to Ludwig's admiration of King Louis XIV of France. Its great Hall of Mirrors' ceiling is painted with 25 frescoes showing Louis XIV at his best.

The palace was shaped in a 'W' with wings flanking the central edifice. Only 16 of the 70 rooms were on the ground floor. Though it was to have been an equivalent to the Palace of Versailles, only the central portion was built before the king died and construction was discontinued with 50 of the 70 rooms still incomplete. It was never intended to be a perfectly exact replica of the French royal palace. Like Versailles, the Hall of Mirrors has 17 arches, the Hall of Peace and the Hall of War on either side have six windows each. The window niches at Herrenchiemsee are slightly wider than those at Versailles, making its central façade a few metres wider. The dining room features an elevator table and the world's largest Meissen porcelain chandelier. Technologically, the building also benefits from nearly two centuries of progress. The original Versailles palace lacked toilets, water, and central heating, while the New Palace has all of these, including a large heated bathtub.

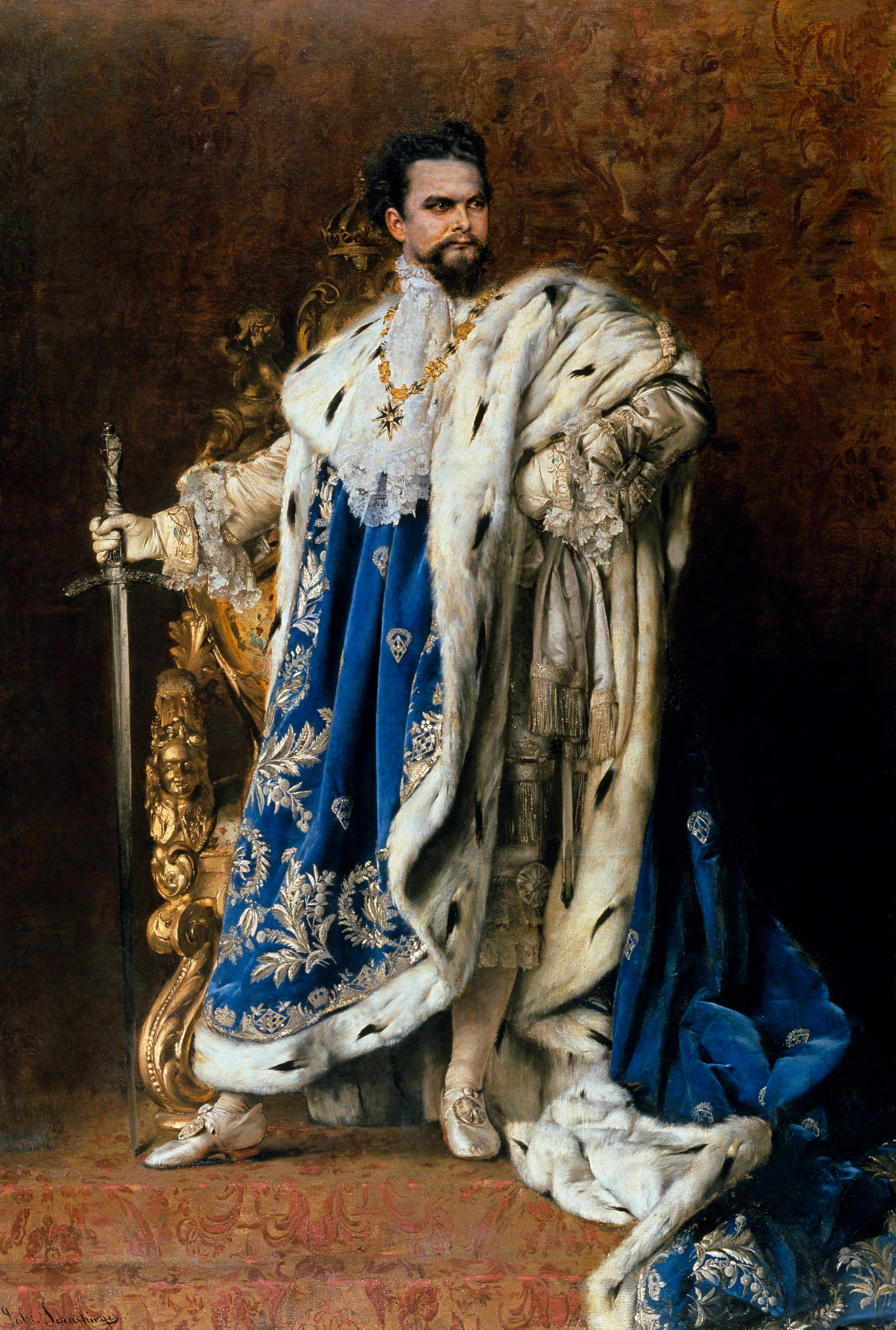
Ludwig II by Gabriel Schachinger. The posthumously finished painting is based on the famous Portrait of Louis XIV by Hyacinthe Rigaud and is exhibited in the Palace.

The palace was constructed on a remote lake island accessible by boat only – today via a system of small steamboats. The nearby chain of the Chiemgau Alps may have been considered less appealing than Neuschwanstein's spectacularly impressive alpine backdrop near Füssen. Herrenchiemsee's interior and exterior were left even more unfinished than Neuschwanstein's. The latter's international popularity, propelled by the inspiration Disney drew from it – say: "Cinderella Castle" – may only have added to the attention the two venues enjoy with tourists. From Munich, Linderhof is located somewhat close to Neuschwanstein, towards Tyrol and Swabia, so tourists often choose to visit both places within a day trip. Chiemsee lies on the way to Salzburg, i.e. almost in an opposite direction.

=== Gardens ===
The formal garden is filled with fountains, a copy of the Versailles Latona Fountain, and statues in both the classical style typical of the gardens of Versailles and the fantastic Romanticism favored by King Ludwig. Statues reminiscent of antiquity are found throughout the gardens, overwrought in the grand style of Richard Wagner's romantic operas.

== Conservation ==
In 2025, the site was designated as a World Heritage Site by UNESCO.

== Gallery ==
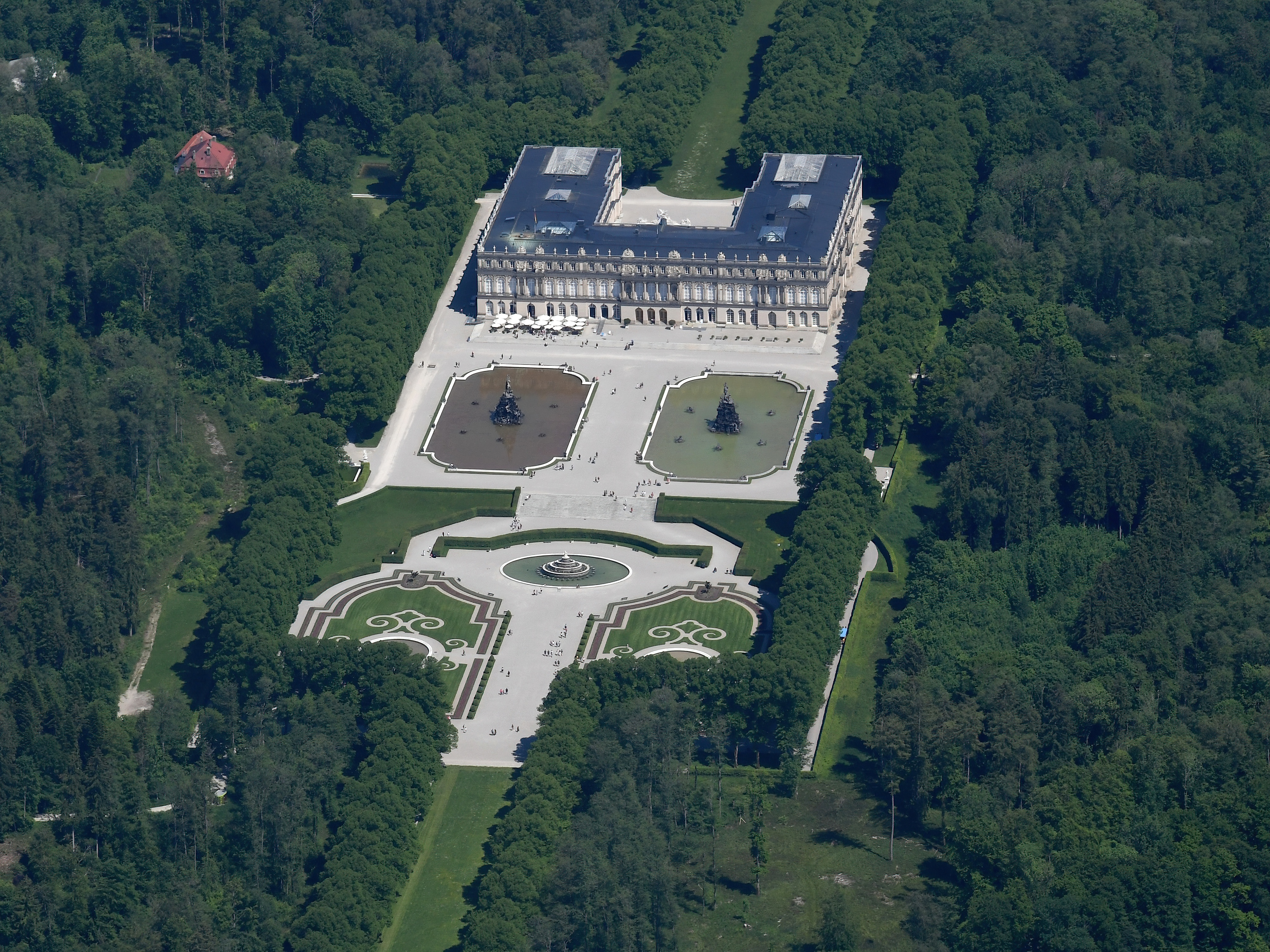
New Palace from the west

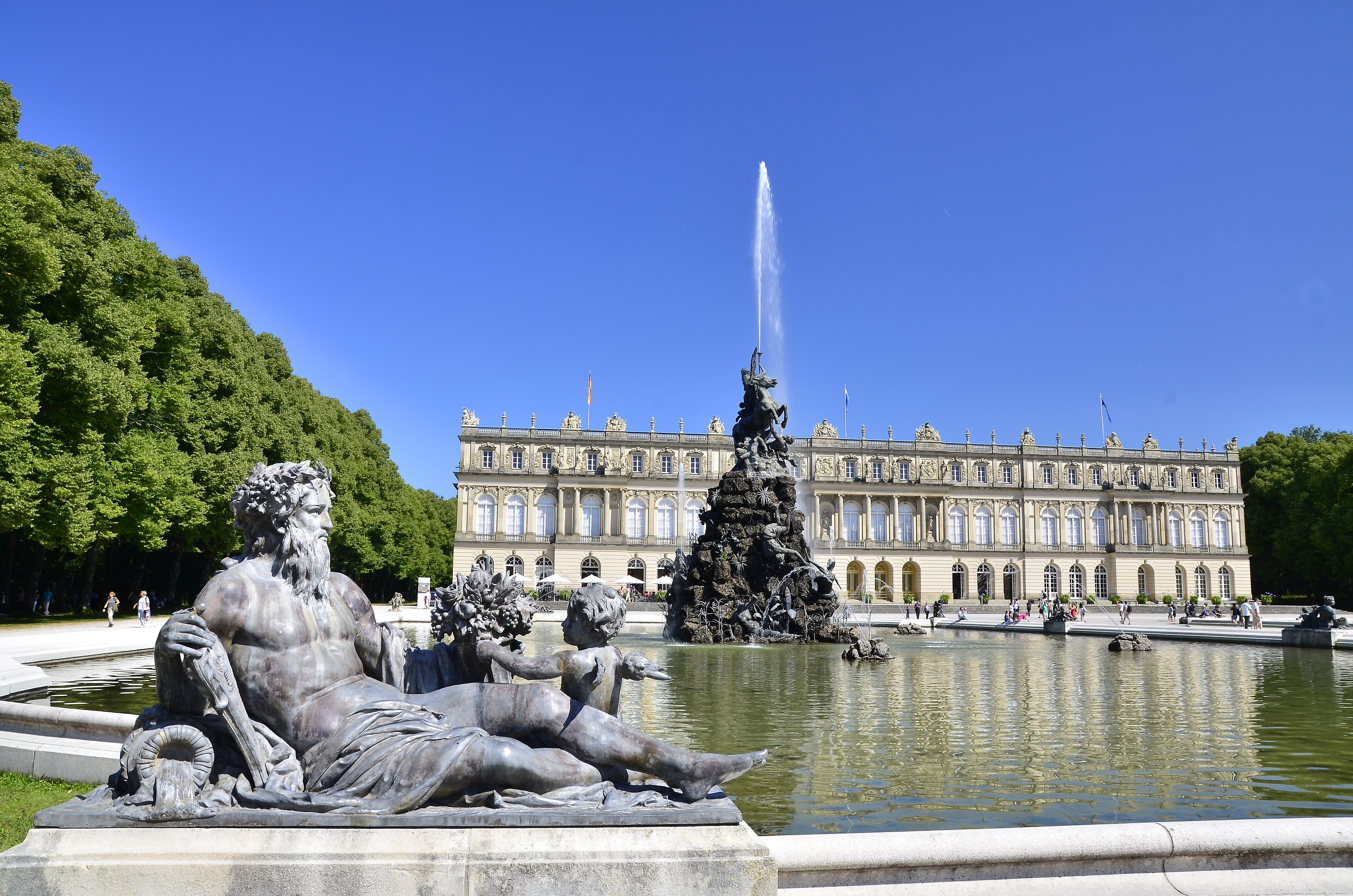
Formal garden with fountains to the west of the New Palace

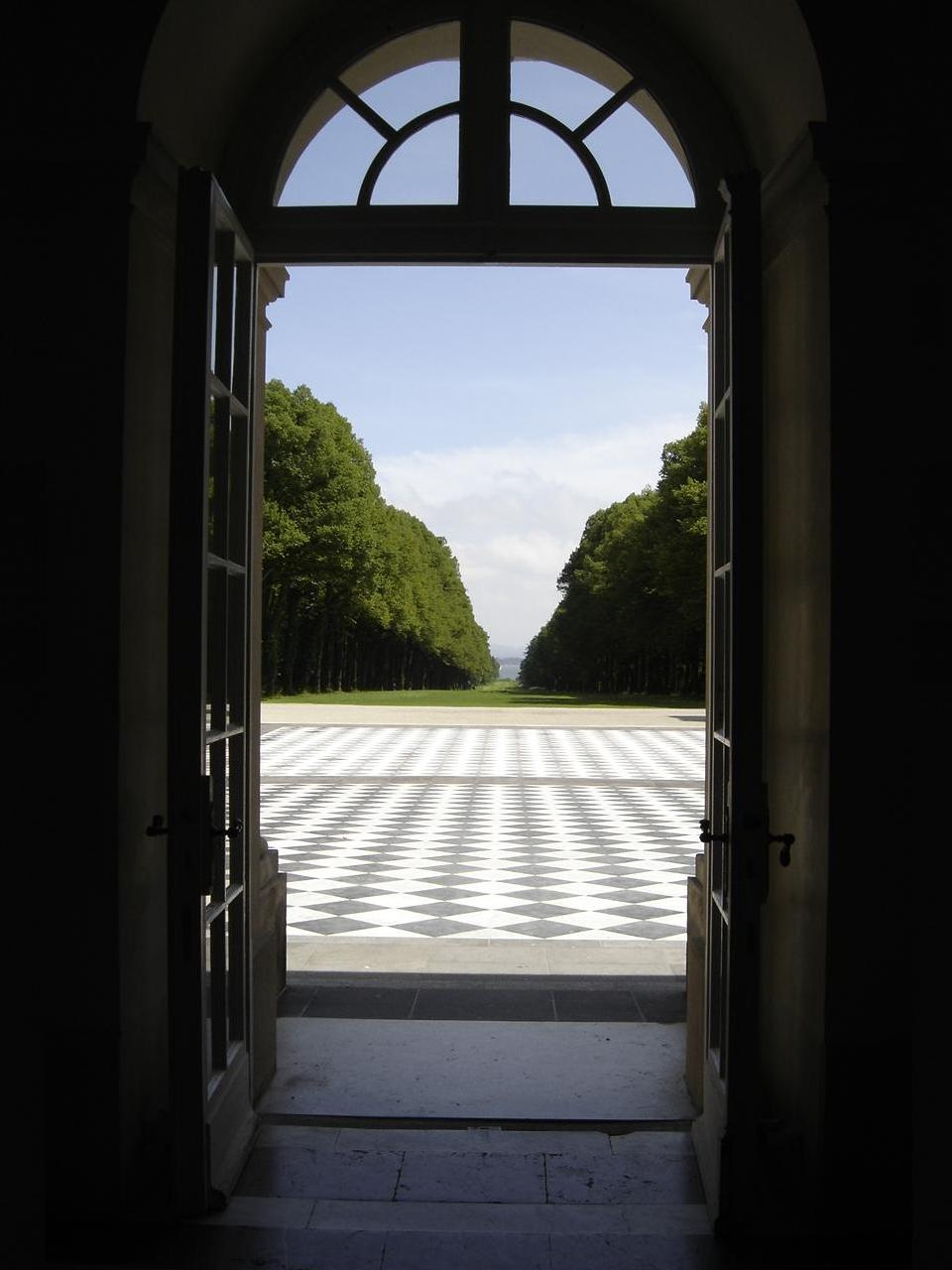
View from the palace to the east

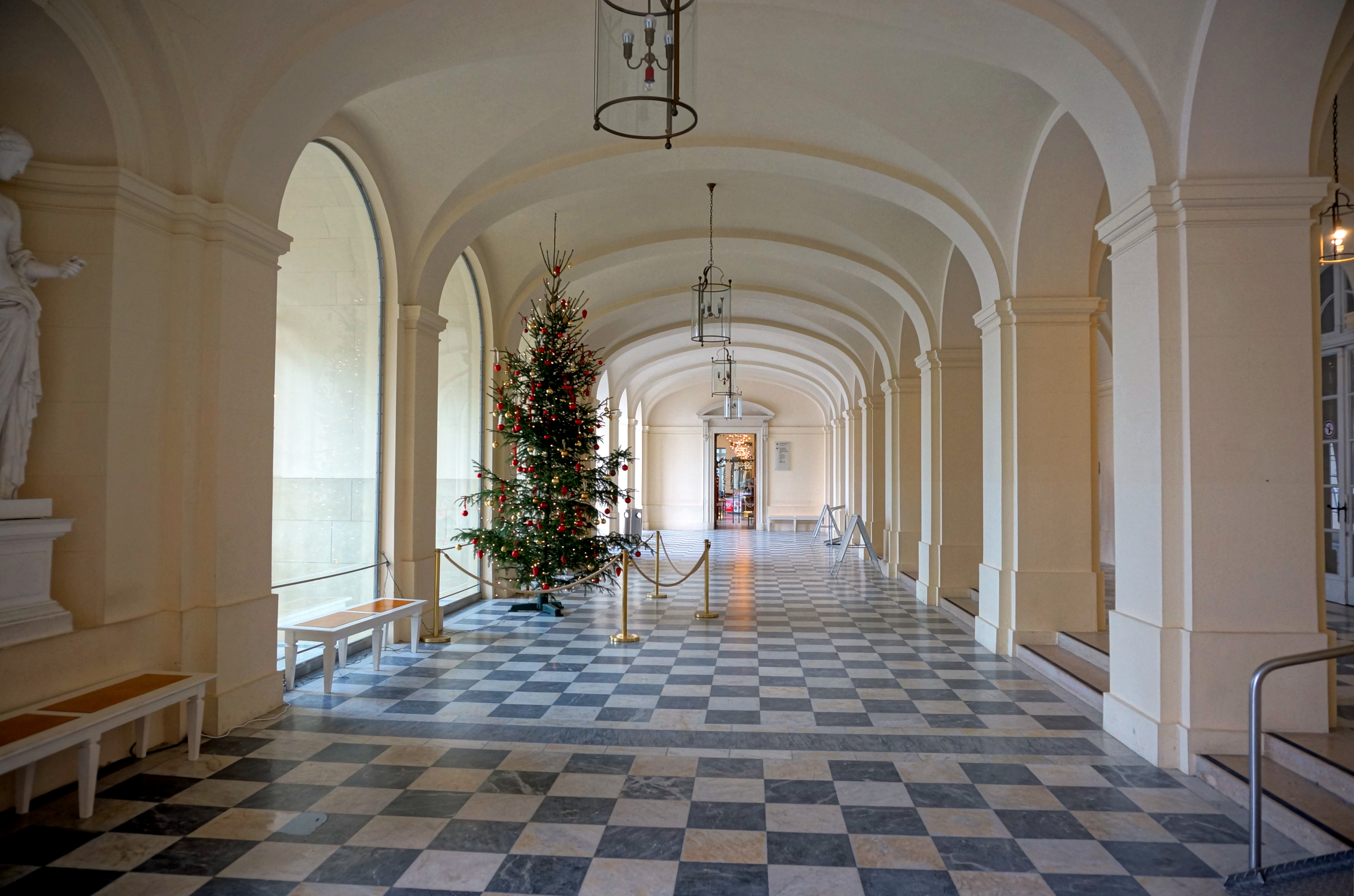
The vestibule

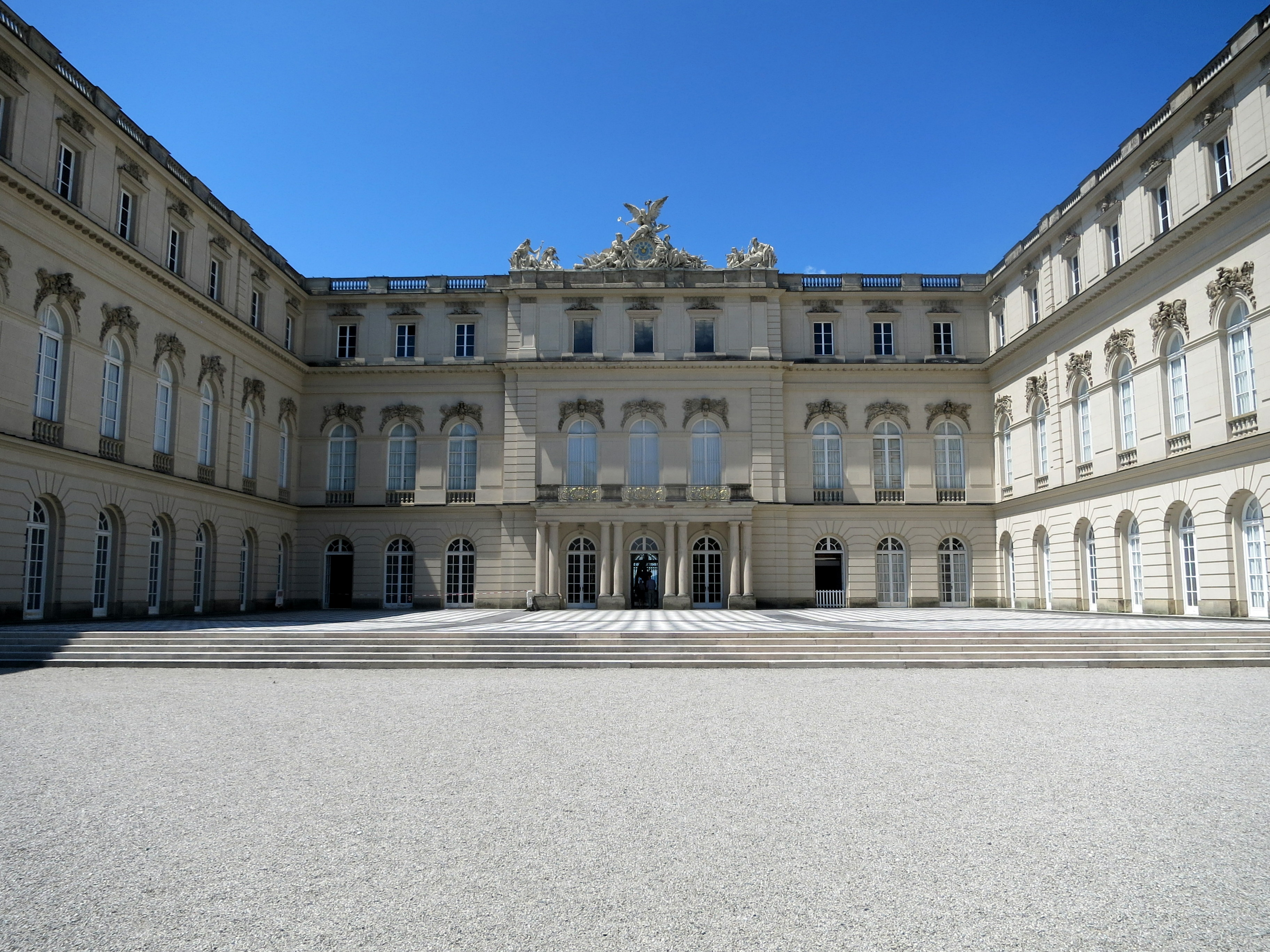
The court of honor

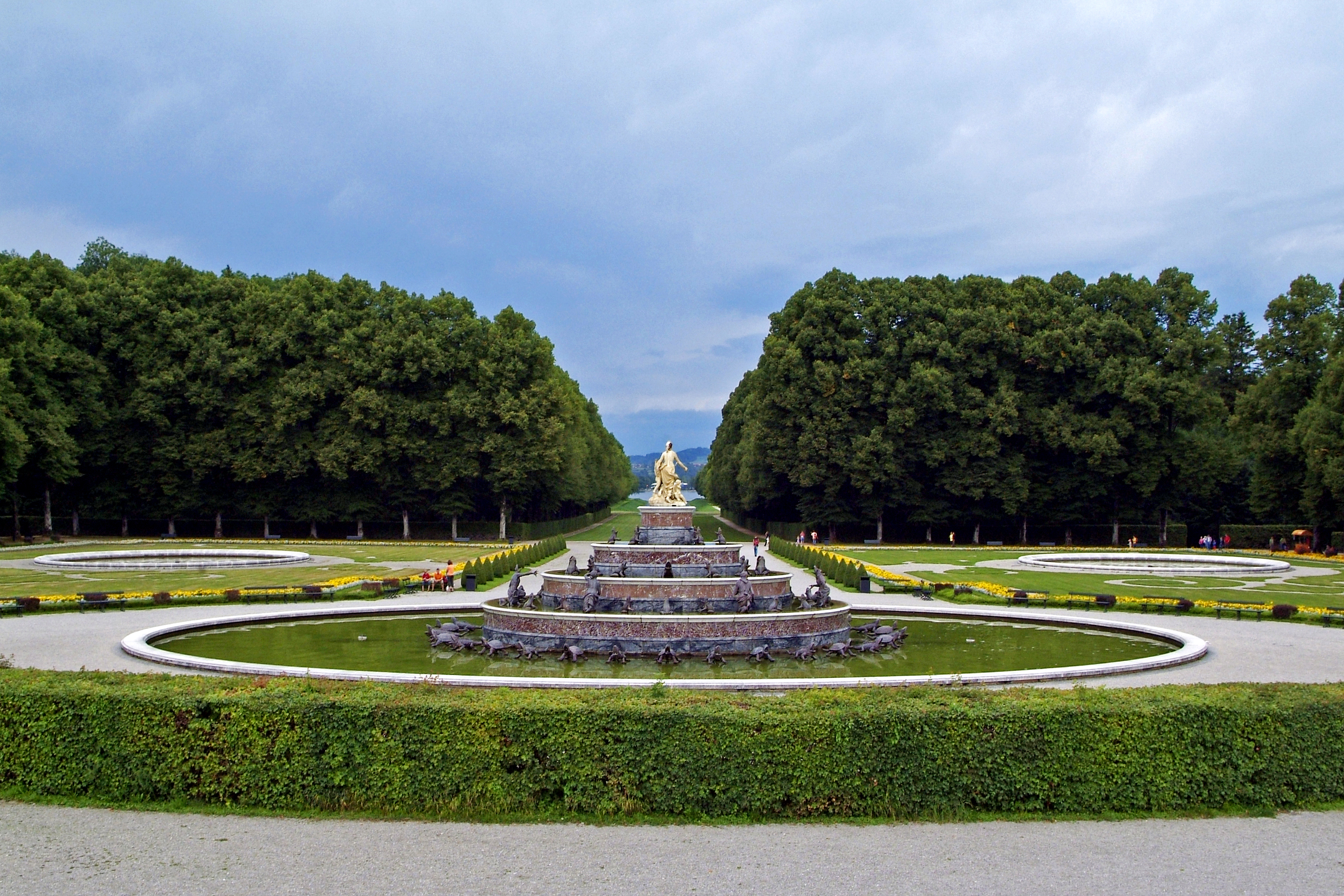
The central axis across the Latona fountain to Chiemsee mimics the Versailles view to the Grand Canal.

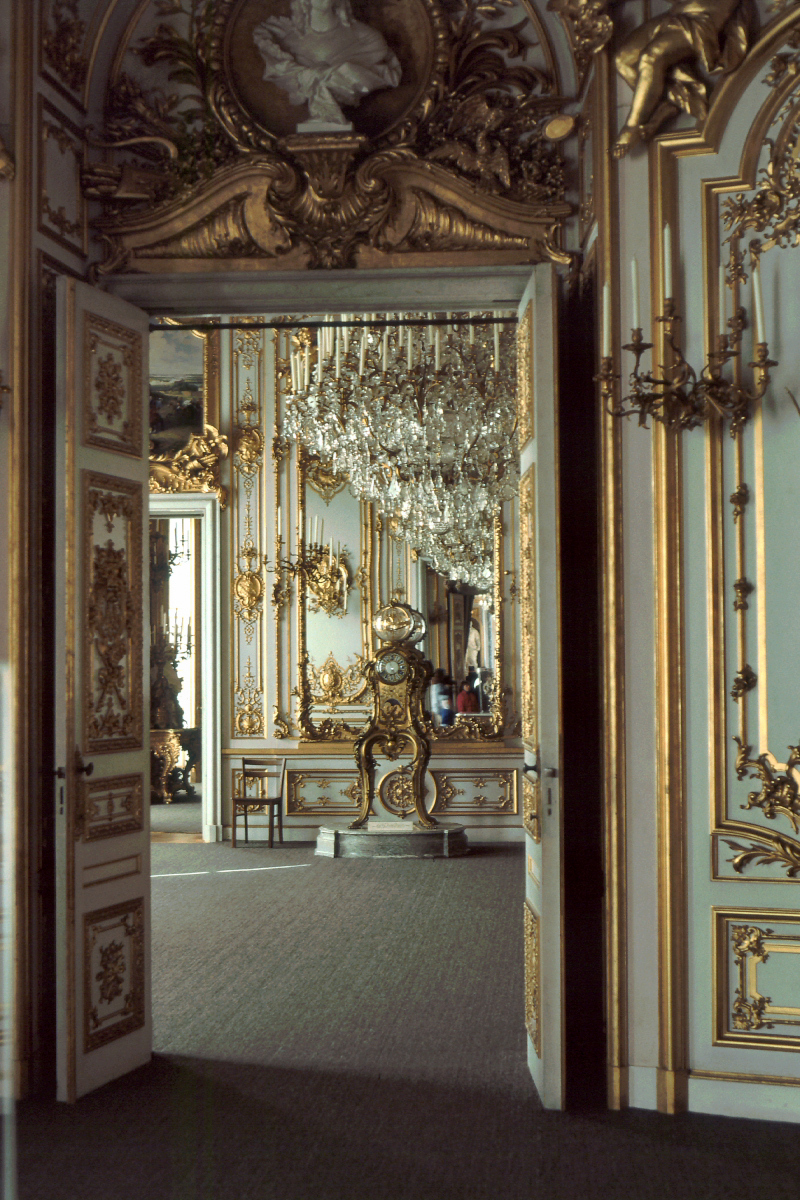
Ludwig's unused Arbeitzimmer reflects Louis XV's Cabinet de travail

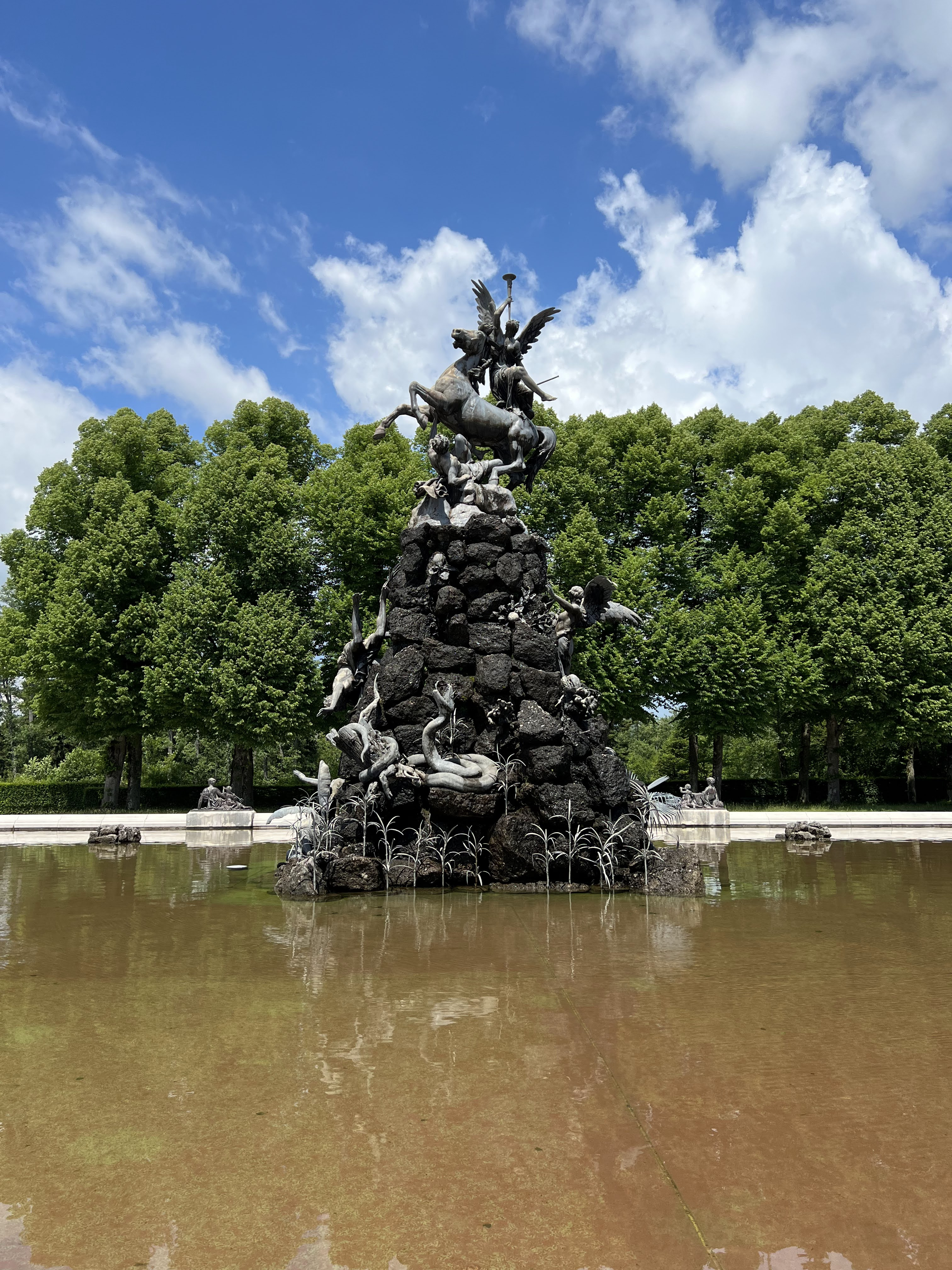
Fountain work

== See also ==
- List of Baroque residences
