= Chiemsee =

Freshwater lake in Bavaria, Germany

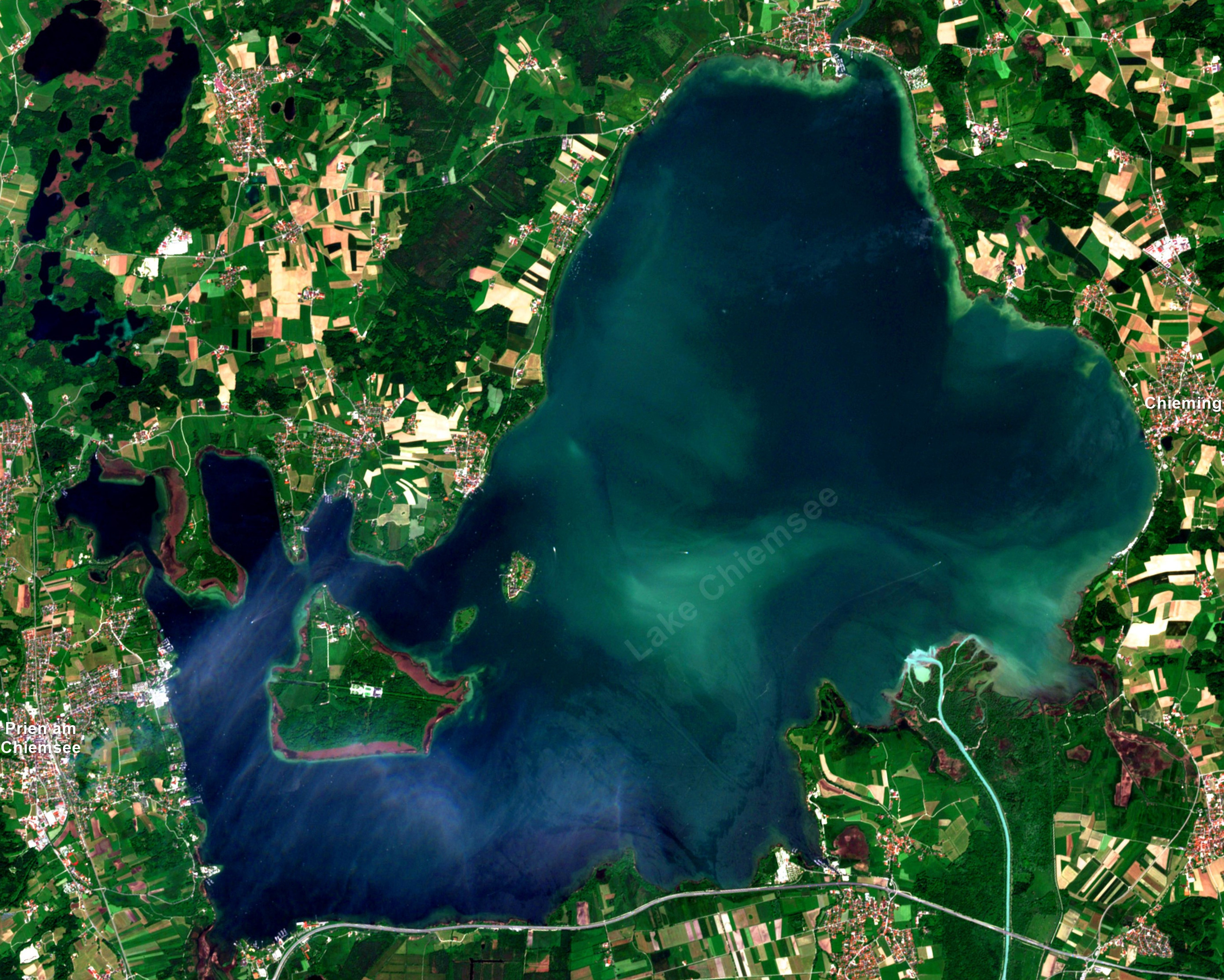
- Satellite view of the Chiemsee

- Location within Bavaria
- Location: Bavaria
- Coordinates: 47°53′24″N 12°28′12″E
- Type: Natural lake
- Primary inflows: Tiroler Achen, Prien
- Primary outflows: Alz
- Basin countries: Germany
- Surface area: 79.9 km^{2} (30.8 sq mi)
- Max. depth: 72.7 m (239 ft)
- Water volume: 2,048×10^{6} m^{3} (72.3×10^{9} cu ft)
- Shore length^{1}: 63.96 km (39.74 mi)
- Surface elevation: 518.19 m (1,700.1 ft)
- Islands: Herreninsel, Fraueninsel, Krautinsel, Schalch

Ramsar Wetland
- Designated: 26 February 1976
- Reference no.: 95
- ^{1} Shore length is not a well-defined measure.

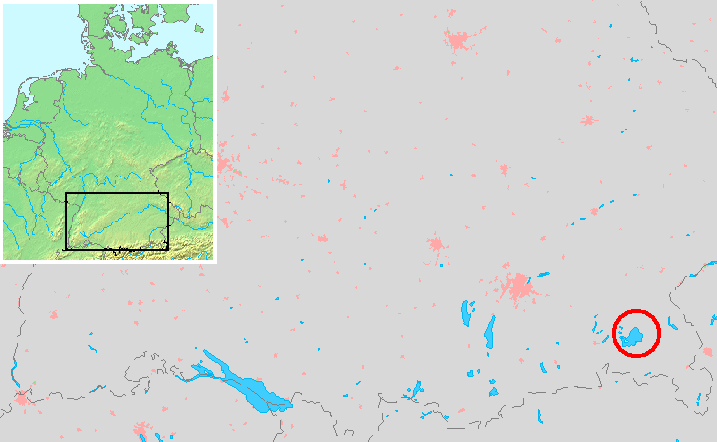
Location of Chiemsee in South Germany

Chiemsee (German pronunciation: [ˈkiːmzeː]) is a freshwater lake in Bavaria, Germany, near Rosenheim. It is often called "the Bavarian Sea". The rivers Tiroler Achen and Prien flow into the lake from the south, and the river Alz flows out towards the north. The Alz flows into the Inn which then merges with the Danube. The Chiemsee is divided into the bigger, north section, in the northeast, called Weitsee, and the Inselsee, in the southwest.

The Chiemgau, the region surrounding the Chiemsee, is a popular recreation area.

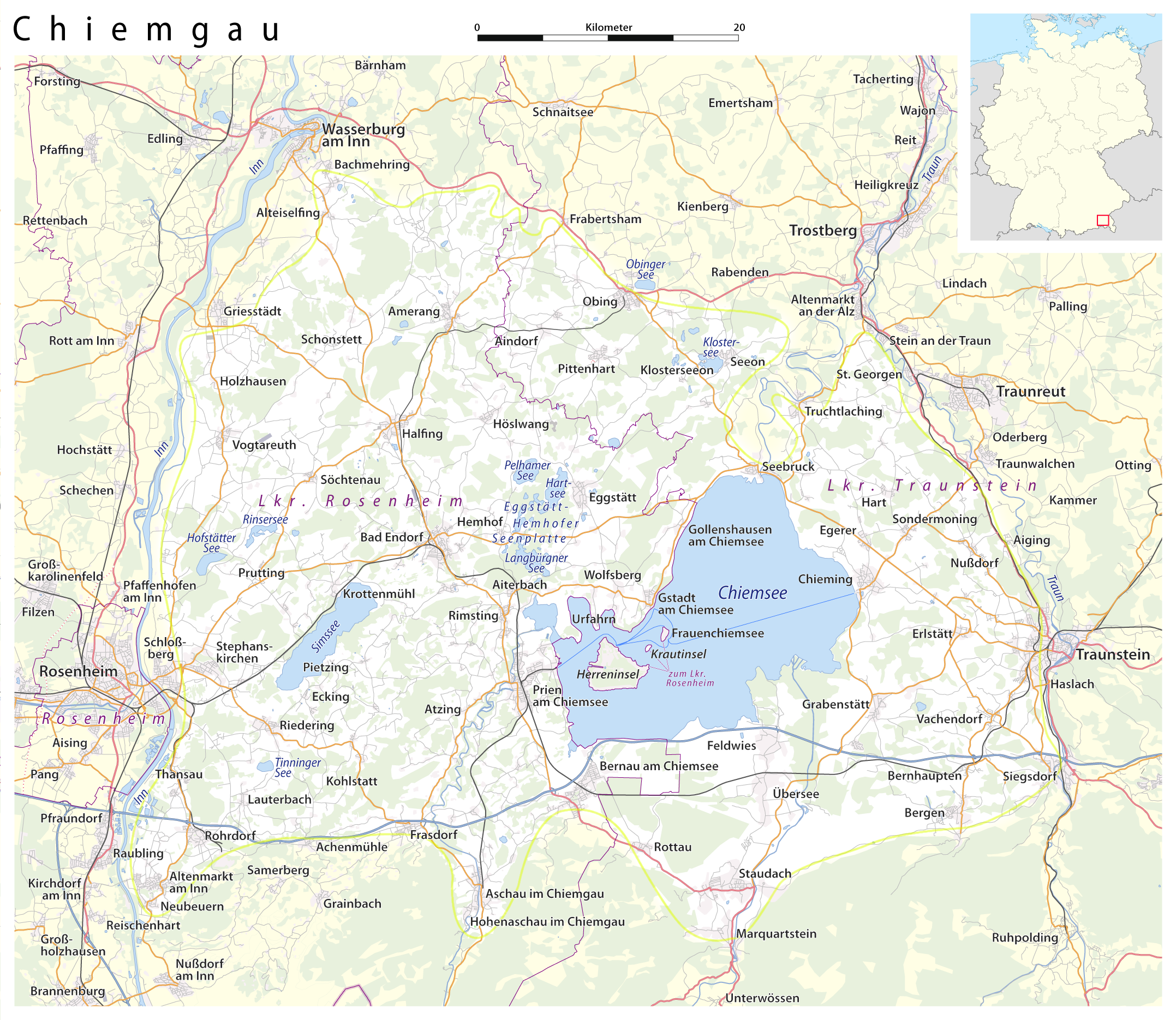
High resolution map of the lake within its surrounding region, Chiemgau

== Origin ==
The Chiemsee was formed, like many other pre-alpine lakes, at the end of the last ice age about 10,000 years ago from a hollow carved out by a glacier (a Zungenbecken). Originally the lake covered an area of almost 240 km^{2} (93 sq mi), which is about three times its present area. Within 10,000 years its area had shrunk to around 80 km^{2} (31 sq mi). Before 1904 the water level was lowered by about a metre. As a result, large areas of dry land were reclaimed.

== Islands ==
There are three main islands on the lake: Herreninsel ("gentlemen's island"), the largest, with an area of 238 hectares (590 acres); Frauenchiemsee, 15.5 ha (38 acres), also called Fraueninsel ("ladies' island"); and the uninhabited Krautinsel ("cabbage island"), 3.5 ha (8.6 acres), called by this name because in the Middle Ages it was cultivated with cabbages and other vegetables.

- Herreninsel has a palace built by King Ludwig II in 1878 called Herrenchiemsee, which was never completed but was meant to be a replica of the Palace of Versailles. Many of its rooms are open to tourists; tours of the palace and its extensive grounds are conducted throughout the summer.
- Frauenchiemsee, the smaller of the two main islands, houses a Benedictine nunnery, built in 782, as well as a small village. The nuns make a liquor called Klosterlikör ("cloister liquor") and marzipan (almond paste).

The smallest island in the lake is the Schalch 66 m (217 ft) west of Frauenchiemsee, which is of square outline, with a side length of only 4.7 m (15 ft) or an area of 22 m^{2} (240 sq ft). This tiny island had probably been created artificially to mark a shallow spot for sailboats. There is a willow on the island, originally planted in 1935, and replaced by a young tree in the 2000s.

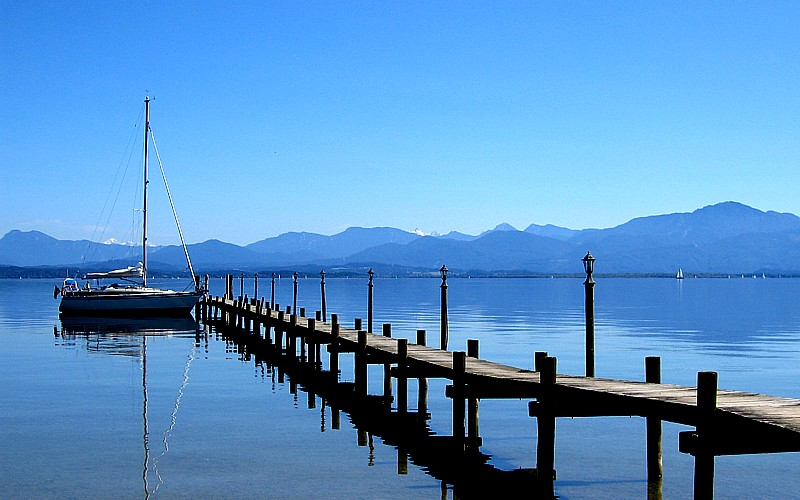
View across the Chiemsee with the Chiemgau Alps in the background

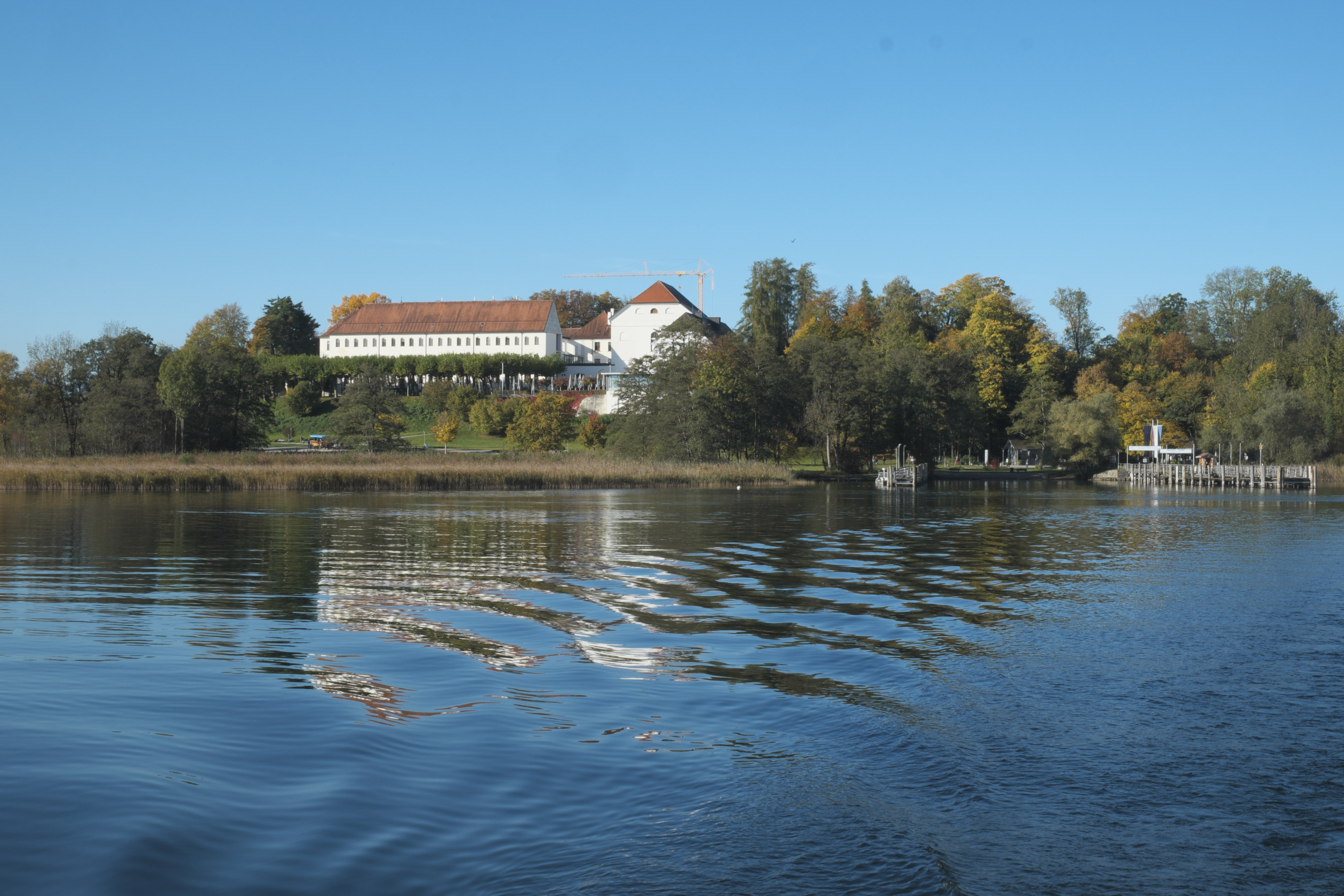
Herreninsel with the former Monastery "Kloster Herrenchiemsee"

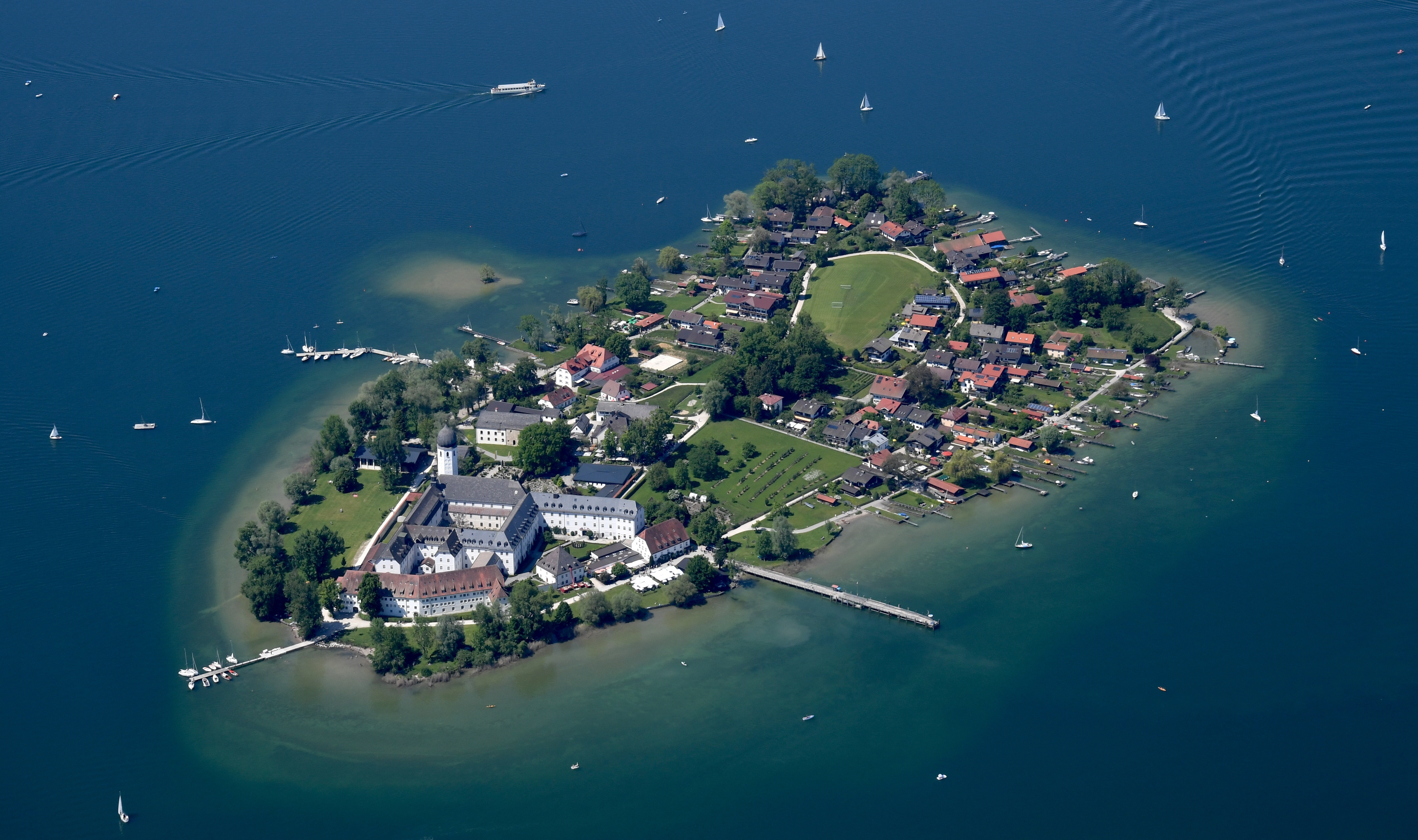
Fraueninsel with Monastery "Frauenchiemsee" in the foreground

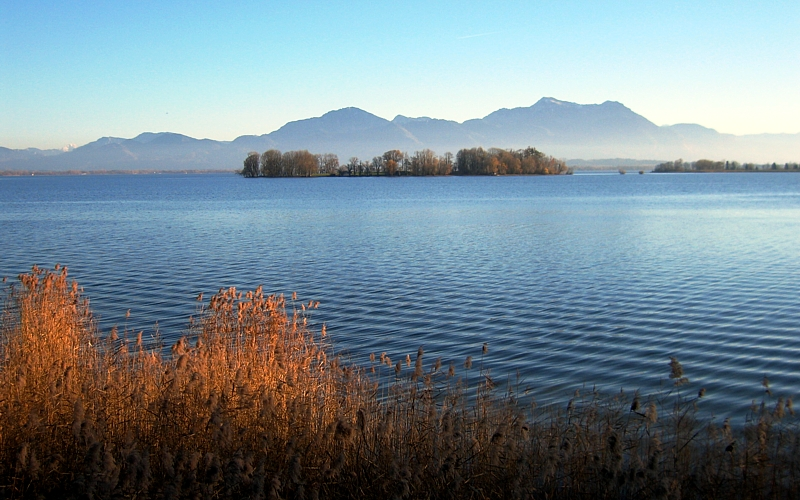
Krautinsel with (right) a small part of the Herreninsel island and in the background the Chiemgau Alps

== AFRC Lake Hotel ==
On 1 September 1938 the first Autobahn rest house opened on the A8 on the outskirts of Bernau am Chiemsee on the lake's southern shore. From 1945 until 2 September 2003 the building served as an Armed Forces Recreation Center for the US military, called the Lake Hotel. The building is now an orthopaedic clinic.
