= Frauenchiemsee =

Island in Bavaria, Germany

Coordinates: 47°52′N 12°26′E

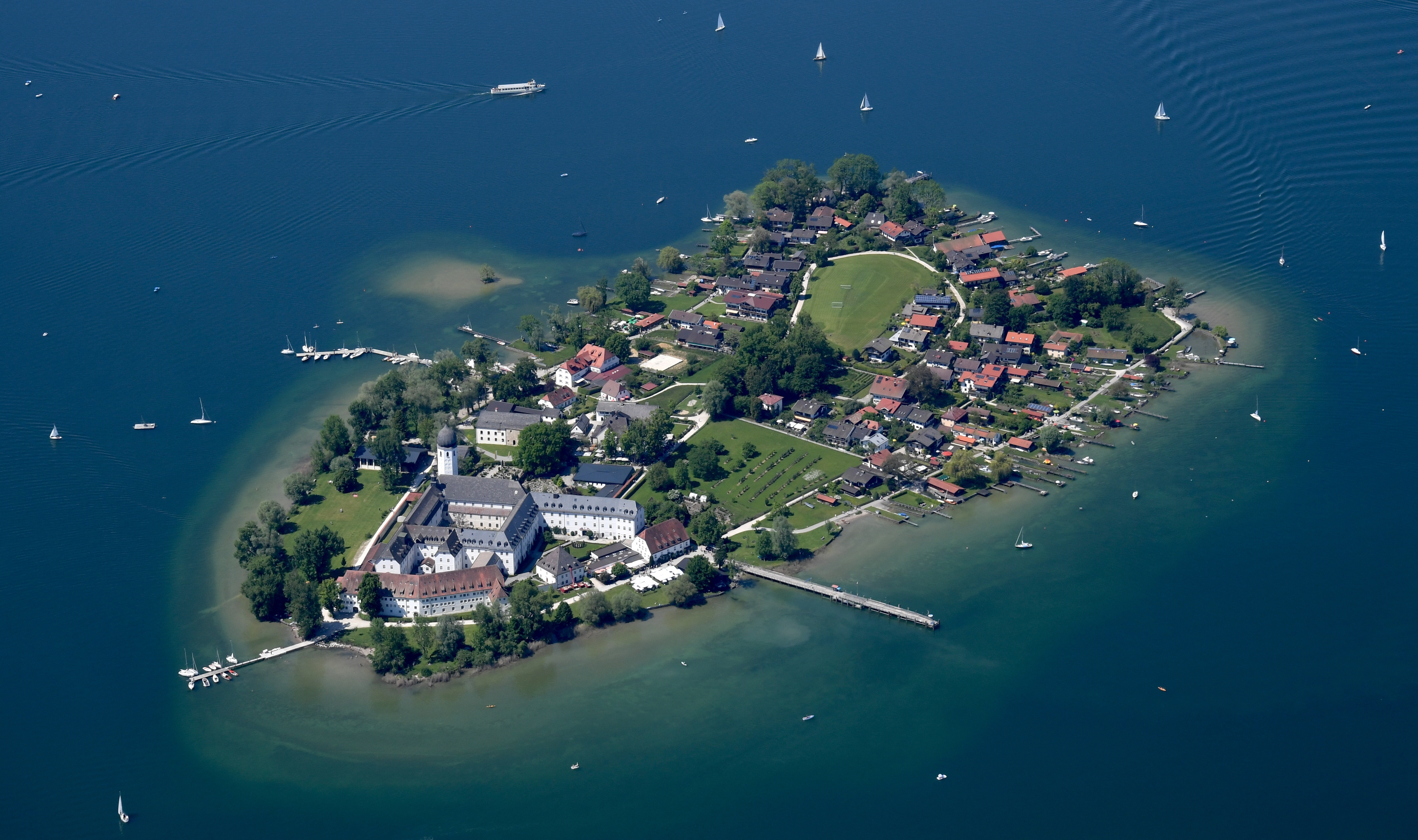
Aerial image of the Fraueninsel (2021)

The island Frauenchiemsee, often called Fraueninsel (German pronunciation: [ˈfʁaʊ̯ənˌʔɪnzl̩]), is the second largest of the three islands in Chiemsee lake, Germany. It belongs to the municipality of Chiemsee in the Upper Bavarian district of Rosenheim, which is the smallest municipality in all of Bavaria. The 15.5-hectare (38-acre) large and car-free Fraueninsel houses a convent of Benedictine nuns, which is usually called Frauenwörth, as well as 300 permanent residents.

== History ==
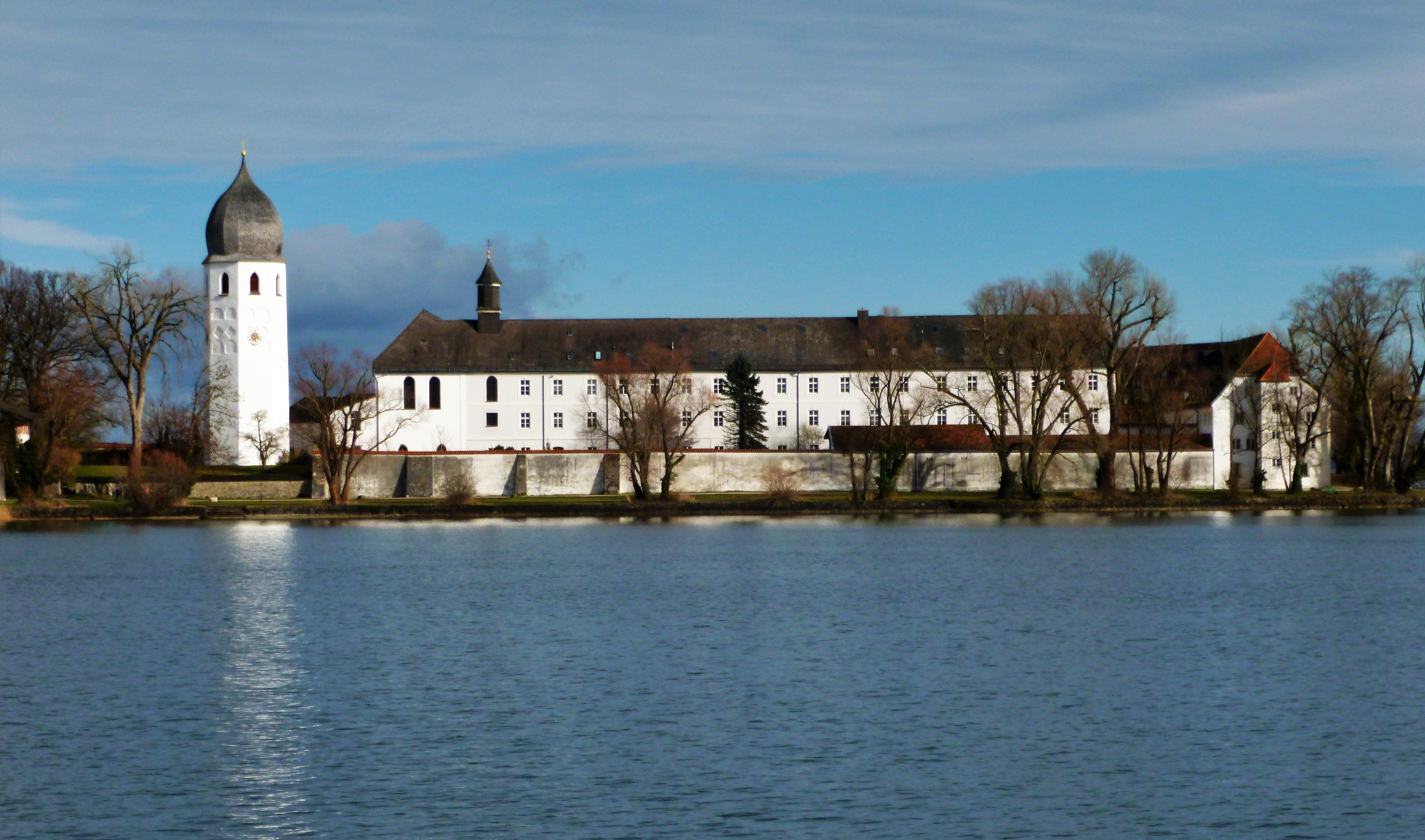
Frauenwörth abbey

The monastery was founded in 782 by Tassilo III, Duke of Bavaria, making Frauenwörth the eldest German speaking convent beyond the Alps. It was called Schönau in the Notitia de servitio monasteriorum. In 850, Blessed Irmengard was the first known abbess. The minster is dedicated to the Purification of the Blessed Virgin Mary.

After the destruction of the Hungarian incursions, the monastery's heyday was between the 11th and 15th centuries. In 1254 the Bavarian dukes finally obtained the rights to Frauenwörth. As the remainder of the old imperial immediacy, the abbey retained the designation Königliches Stift ("Royal Monastery") until the secularization of 1803 and was reserved for the daughters of the nobility.

The monastery buildings were rebuilt between 1728 and 1732. In the course of the German Mediatisation the monastery was secularized between 1803 and 1835; only five nuns were allowed to stay due to their age. In 1837 King Ludwig I of Bavaria rebuilt the monastery for the Benedictine nuns and allowed them to receive new candidates on the condition that the nuns created their livelihood by opening schools. Henceforth, a grammar school, called Irmengard Gymnasium, existed on the site until 1995. Furthermore, the Benedictines ran a vocational school for nursery teachers, housekeepers et cetera. In 1901 the convent was declared an abbey again. As of 2016 the monastery has 21 sisters, the abbess is Johanna Mayer OSB.

== Architecture and landmarks ==
=== Island cathedral ===
The island cathedral stands on Carolingian foundations, and the current church building, dedicated to the Presentation of Mary, dates back to the 11th century. Between 1468 and 1476, a net rib vault was installed. Between 1688 and 1702, it was furnished with the Baroque altars that are still preserved today. The campanile, a free-standing bell tower located northwest of the church, is one of the landmarks of the Chiemgau region and probably dates back to the 12th century; its Baroque onion dome was added in 1626.

=== Island cemetery ===
Many artists and scholars are buried in the island cemetery north of the monastery church, including the Chiemsee painter Max Haushofer and the writers Wilhelm Jensen and Felix Schlagintweit. The latter gave a literary description of the cemetery in his 1943 novel Ein verliebtes Leben (A Life in Love). Several members of the Eichendorff noble family are also buried there.

=== Carolingian gate hall ===
The Carolingian gate hall is from the early days of the monastery, which dates back to 850. It is a rectangular building made of gray-brown Nagelfluh stone with a square extension on the east side. Its ground floor once housed a small St. Nicholas Chapel. During restoration work, almost life-size depictions of angels were uncovered here. Of these six red outline drawings, which are impressive in their simplicity, two are still almost completely preserved. They were previously dated to the 9th century, but are now believed to be later. A large barrel-vaulted passageway runs through the center of the ground floor of the gate hall, bordered on both sides by an open row of arcades with three arches each. The Baroque vicarage adjoins the west side.

=== Lime grove and ancient trees ===
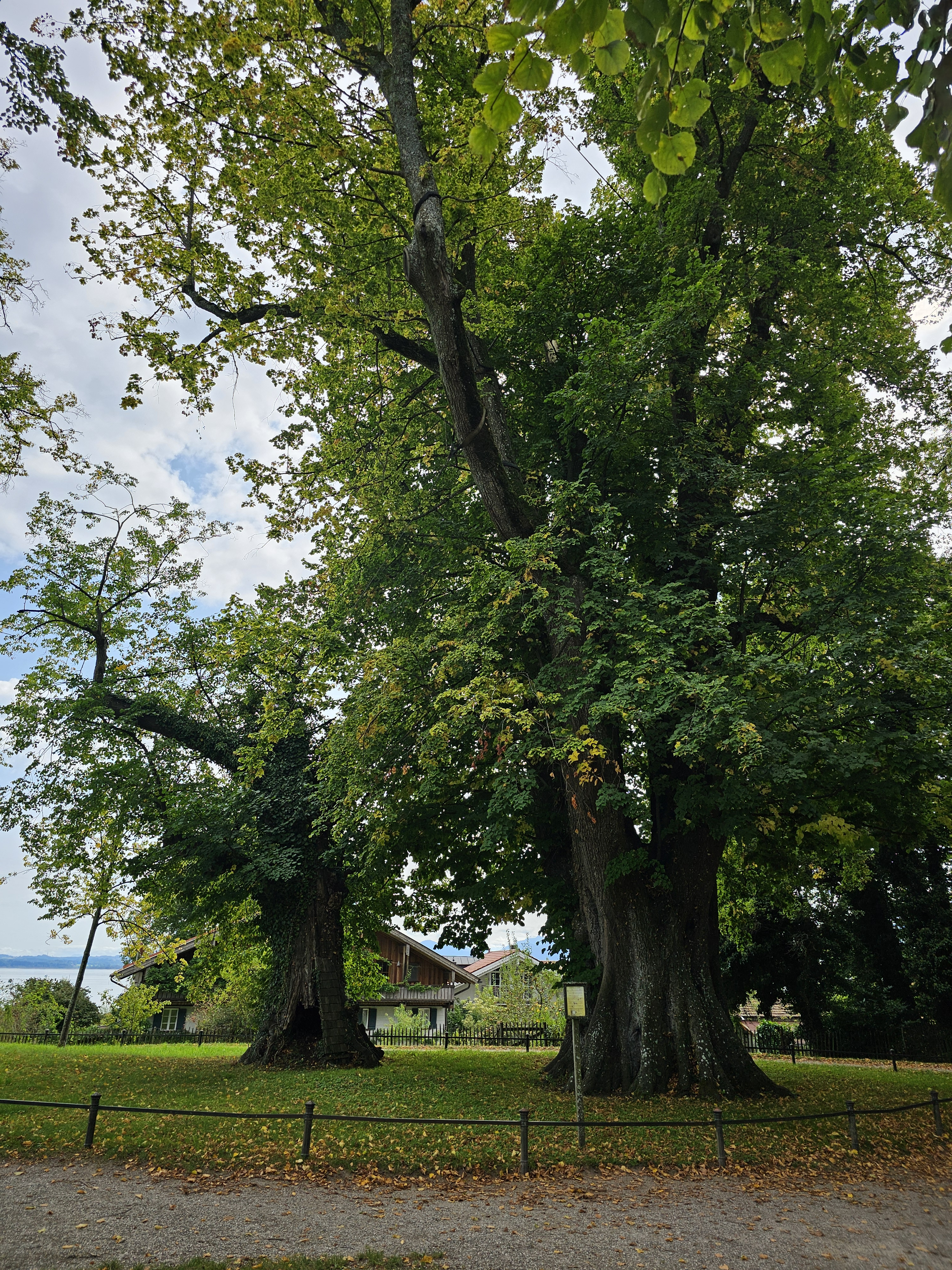
The Lime Grove on Fraueninsel. The grove includes the Marienlinde (left) and Tassilolinde (right), both estimated to be over 1,000 years old.

At the center of the island lies a historic lime grove, featuring two ancient trees of particular significance: the Tassilo lime tree (Tassilolinde) and the Marien lime tree (Marienlinde), both estimated to be over 1,000 years old. These trees mark the highest point of the Fraueninsel and are among the oldest living specimens in the region.

The Tassilo lime tree remains in relatively good health, displaying vigorous growth despite its age. In contrast, the Marien lime tree is in a state of severe decline due to its advanced age. To preserve its cultural and historical value while ensuring visitor safety, the remaining ruins of the tree have been stabilized and secured. Conservation efforts aim to allow the tree to age with dignity, maintaining its presence as a natural monument.

The grove also contains a World War I memorial chapel, constructed after the war. Its front wall features a large painting by Hiasl Maier-Erding, depicting an elderly fishing couple in prayer, with Lake Chiemsee and Fraueninsel in the background. The chapel was built on the site of the former St. Martin's Church, first documented in 1393 but later demolished following secularization.

== Tourism ==
Frauenchiemsee along with its sister island Herreninsel is one of the main tourist attractions on the Chiemsee, and is famous for the monastery's liquor spirit, which is produced by the nuns. The island is accessible by ship year round, usually from Gstadt, Prien, and Seebruck. There are also several boats that can take passengers from Frauenchiemsee to Herreninsel and back.

As part of a family grave, a cenotaph to Alfred Jodl, Nazi Wehrmacht army general and executed war criminal, was located on the island, but was removed in 2018 after a decision of the local council. His brother and German general Ferdinand Jodl is buried in the family grave.
