= Baumann (surname) =

Baumann is a German surname. It is an occupational surname referring to some categories of farmers. It may also be a dialectal respelling of Buhmann. and may refer to:

== A ==
- Adalbert Baumann, Bavarian teacher
- Albert Baumann, Swiss Olympic shooter
- Alex Baumann (born 1964), Canadian swimmer
- Alex Baumann (bobsleigh) (born 1985), Swiss bobsledder
- Alexander Baumann (disambiguation), multiple people
- Alyssa Baumann (born 1998), American artistic gymnast
- Arthur Anthony Baumann (1856–1936), British lawyer and Conservative politician
- August Christian Baumann (1770–1831), Norwegian mine superintendent and politician

== B ==
- Beate Baumann (born 1963), German political advisor
- Bernd Baumann (born 1958), German politician
- Bill Baumann (born 1942), Australian politician
- Buddy Baumann (disambiguation), multiple people

== C ==
- Cajetan J. B. Baumann (1899–1969), American architect
- Carsten Baumann (footballer, born 1946), German football player
- Carsten Baumann (footballer, born 1974), German football player
- Charles O. Baumann (1874 – 1931) American film producer
- Charlie Baumann (born 1967), American footballer
- Charly Baumann (1928-2001), German circus animal trainer
- Claude Baumann (born 1953), Swiss chess master
- Craig Baumann (born 1953), Australian politician

== D ==
- Dieter Baumann (born 1965), German athlete
- Dominik Baumann (born 1992), Austrian racing driver

== E ==
- Edgar Baumann (born 1970), Paraguayan javelin thrower
- Edith Baumann (born 1948), American artist
- Elisabeth Jerichau-Baumann (1819–1881), Danish painter
- Emil Baumann, co-creator of Toblerone
- Eric Baumann (cyclist) (born 1980), German cyclist
- Ernst Baumann (1909–1992), Swiss painter
- Erwin Friedrich Baumann (1890–1980), Swiss architect
- Eugen Baumann, (1846–1896), German chemist
- Eugene A. Baumann (1817–1869), French American landscape architect

== F ==
- Frank Baumann (disambiguation), multiple people
- Franz Baumann (born 1953), United Nations official
- Fred E. Baumann, American political philosopher
- Fritz Baumann (1886–1942), Swiss painter

== G ==
- Garrett Baumann (born 2004), American baseball player
- Georg Baumann, Estonian wrestler
- Günter Baumann (born 1947), German politician
- Gustave Baumann (1881–1971), American printmaker and painter

== H ==
- Hans Baumann (disambiguation), multiple people
- Heinz Baumann (disambiguation), multiple people
- Herbert Baumann (1925–2020), German composer
- Hermann Baumann (disambiguation), multiple people
- Hilary Baumann Hacker (1913–1990), Roman Catholic Bishop
- Horst H. Baumann (1934–2019), German architect, designer, light artist and photographer

== I ==
- Isabel Baumann (born 1978), Swiss bobsledder

== J ==
- James Baumann, American politician
- Johannes Baumann (1874–1953), Swiss politician
- Jörg Baumann (born 1981), German politician

== K ==
- Karsten Baumann (born 1969), German footballer
- Ken Baumann (born 1989), American actor

== L ==
- Lorena Baumann (born 1997), Swiss footballer
- Ludwig Baumann (architect), (1873–1936), Austrian architect
- Ludwig Baumann (born 1950), German opera singer

== M ==
- Matthias Baumann (born 1963), German equestrian
- Max Baumann (1917–1999), German composer
- Michael Baumann (1947–2016), German author and terrorist
- Mike Baumann (born 1995), American baseball player

== O ==
- Oliver Baumann (born 1990), German footballer
- Oscar Baumann (1864–1899), Austrian explorer in Africa

== P ==
- Paddy Baumann (1885–1969), American baseball player
- Patrik Baumann (born 1986), Swiss footballer
- Pauline Baumann (1899–1977), British artist
- Paweł Baumann (born 1983), Polish sprint canoer
- Peter Baumann (disambiguation), multiple people

== R ==
- Rainer Baumann (1930–2021), German footballer
- Randy Baumann (born 1972), American radio personality
- Roland Baumann (born 1992), Austrian politician
- Romed Baumann (born 1986), Austrian alpine skier

== W ==
- Werner Baumann (born 1962), German chief executive (CEO) of Bayer.
- Wilhelm Baumann (handballer) (1912–1990), German handball player

== See also ==
- Baumann family (architects)
- Bowman (disambiguation)
- Paumann
- Bouman
