= German Burschenschaft =

German umbrella organization for student fraternities

- DB
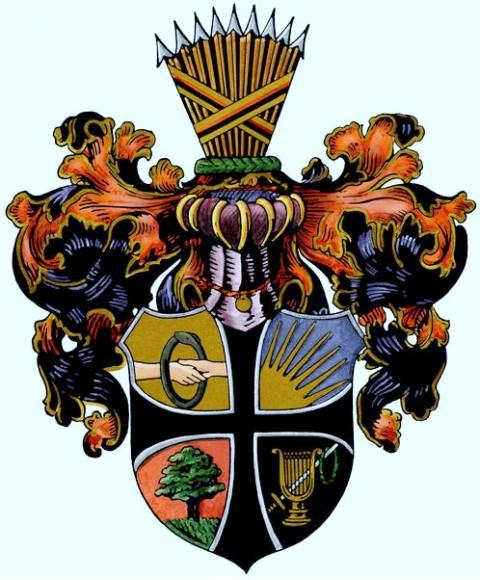
- Founded: 1881; 145 years ago Eisenach, Thuringia, Germany
- Type: Umbrella
- Affiliation: Independent
- Status: Active
- Emphasis: Student associations
- Scope: Germany and Austria
- Motto: "Honour - Freedom - Fatherland"
- Colors: Red, Black and Gold
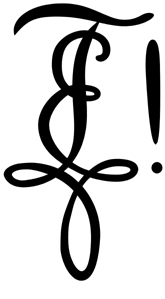
- Zirkel
- Publication: Burschenschaftlichen Blätter
- Members: 66 fraternities active
- Former name: Allgemeiner Deputierten-Convent
- Headquarters: Löberstraße 14; Eisenach 99817; Germany
- Website: www.burschenschaft.de

The German Burschenschaft (German: Deutsche Burschenschaft, DB) is an association of Burschenschaften (comparable in some respects with fraternities); a co-operation of student associations of a certain form in Germany and Austria. It was created in 1881 as a General Deputies Convent (ADC) and received its current name in 1902. It goes back to the ideas associated with the founding of the native fraternetie (Urburschenschaft) in Jena in the year 1815. The ideal goals are outlined in the motto "Honour - Freedom - Fatherland".

Today, the German Burschenschaft is considered to be a right-wing fraternity. This status was preceded by internal directional struggles from the 2000s onwards, in which the German nationalistic fraternities prevailed. According to their own numbers, Deutsche Burschenschaft has 7000 members in almost 70 fraternities.

== History ==
In 1881, the "General Deputies Convent" (“Allgemeiner Deputierten-Convent”) was founded by 35 fraternities in Eisenach, renamed "German Burschenschaft" in 1902. The members agreed on commonalities in general student and student affairs, but in a number of other matters the individual fraternities should decide for themselves. A recording of Austrian Burschenschaft was initially rejected for the reason that the association at that time "basically rejected the active participation in political issues" according to the statement on the website of Deutsche Burschenschaft. When in 1919 the Treaty of St. Germain was made and the unification of Germany and Austria into a Großdeutsches Reich was ruled out, the Deutsche Burschenschaft merged with the Austrian "Burschenschaft der Ostmark". In its understanding, at least the Burschenschaften unite the German fatherland.

In a number of participating Burschenschaften antisemitism was common; all members had to be Christian. Jewishness was not seen as being religious, i.e Judaism, but was racialised. Resulting from several disputes at the annual Burschentag (fraternity day) in 1920 it was established that membership was not open to Jews or descendants of Jews or people whose fiancées had Jewish ancestors. In addition, many Burschenschafter were against the first German Republic, the so-called Weimarer Republik and they scattered to accept the defeat in the First World War.

In 1996 some liberal-conservative Burschenschaften stepped out of Deutsche Burschenschaft and founded the “New German Burschenschaft”. In 2011 there were a debate at Burschentag in Eisenach about a so-called “Ariernachweis” for members. Two years later this proposal was secluded. Nevertheless, some associations left Deutsche Burschenschaft and the numbers of members were cut in half. Some of the Burschenschaften stepped into “New German Burschenschaft” and some others founded in 2016 the “General German Burschenschaft”.

In 2014 the executive committee of German Social Democratic Party SPD made a "incompatibility decision". It forbids belonging to both the SPD and a fraternity, which is organized in the umbrella organization Deutsche Burschenschaft. SPD reacted to the ongoing radicalization of DB and the "increasingly nationalist and Greater German program". That is incompatible with the values of social democracy.

Traditionally there were two wings in the German Burschenschaft: conservative on one side and völkisch or extreme-right members on the other side. The newspaper Die Tageszeitung wrote in 2018, that for a long time, DB had seen itself as "nonpartisan - from the CDU / CSU on the Republicans to the NPD". But when Alternative for Germany (AfD) gained strength in Germany the right-wing gained more influence in the DB. Especially the AfD-Youth Organization "Young Alternative" became attractive for fraternity members. According to an AfD-member of Parliament of Nordrhein-Westfalia, about 20 percent of Young Alternative members are also organized in fraternities by 2018.

== Symbols ==
The colours of the German Burschenschaft have been the colours black, red and gold, first used by the Urburschenschaft since its founding. These colours have been considered the German national colours since the Hambach Festival and became official state colours in 1848, 1919 and 1949. Its motto is "Honour - Freedom - Fatherland".

== Notable members ==
- Hans Furler, CDU politician and President of the European Parliament
- Albrecht Glaser, AfD politician
- Martin Graf, FPÖ politician (Burschenschaft Olympia)
- Christian Hafenecker, FPÖ politician (Burschenschaft Nibelungia)
- Hans-Jörg Jenewein, FPÖ politician (Burschenschaft Nibelungia)
- Peter Ramsauer, CSU politician
- Martin Sellner, Identitarian activist (former Burschenschaft Olympia, now Sängerschaft Barden)
- Harald Stefan, FPÖ politician (Burschenschaft Olympia)
- Christian Wirth, AfD politician
- Jörg Schneider, AfD politician
- Axel Kassegger, FPÖ politician (Burschenschaft Thessalia, Burschenschaft Germania Graz)
- Norbert Nemeth, FPÖ politician (Burschenschaft Olympia)
- Enrico Komning, AfD politician
- Benjamin Nolte, AfD politician
- Philipp Schrangl, FPÖ politician (Burschenschaft Oberösterreicher Germanen, Wien)

== Literature ==
- D. Heither (2004): Burschenschaften Rechte Netzwerke auf Lebenszeit. In: Rechte Netzwerke—eine Gefahr (pp. 133–145). VS Verlag für Sozialwissenschaften.
- H. Brunck (1999): Die Deutsche Burschenschaft in der Weimarer Republik und im Nationalsozialismus. München: Universitas.
