= Baumann =

Baumann (German: builder) may refer to:

- Baumann (surname)
- Mount Baumann, mountain in Togo

== See also ==
- Baumann's Cave
- Bauman
- Bowman (disambiguation)
- Paumann
