= Jamie Baldridge =

American photographer and arts educator

- Born: May 24, 1975 (age 51); New Iberia, Louisiana
- Education: Louisiana State University
- Known for: Photography, Digital Mixed Media, Arts Educator
- Movement: Surrealism, Magic Realism
- Spouse: Brooke Beduze Baldridge
- Website: jamiebaldridge.com

Jamie Baldridge (born May 24, 1975) is an American photographer and arts educator. He creates highly manipulated and surreal tableau vivant photographs. He is currently a professor of Photography in the Visual Arts Department at the University of Louisiana at Lafayette.

== Life and work ==
Jamie Baldridge was born and raised in New Iberia, Louisiana on May 24, 1975. He was raised in a conservative, Catholic household. He went on to study at Louisiana State University at Baton Rouge where he received both his Bachelor of Fine Arts and later his Master of Fine Arts degree.

He is known for creating highly manipulated surreal tableau vivant photography. Baldridge's work references many literary, philosophical, religious, and artistic themes such as the symbolism and psychology of dream imagery, the frangibility of relationships, altered states of consciousness, Jungian archetypes, and esoteric tales and fables. "He has filtered those loaded fables through his subconscious, tempered them with dystopia, tasty fetishes and research gleaned from the musty stacks of Latin scholarship, and emerged with (a) painterly surrealistic vision." He cites Leonora Carrington, Søren Kierkegaard, Joseph Campbell, Salvador Dalí, Pablo Picasso, Remedios Varo, Edward Gorey, and the Epic of Gilgamesh as but a few of his varied inspirations. His subjects, often have their faces and/or heads obscured allowing the viewer greater opportunity for symbolic interpretations of identity and challenging accepted preconceptions about the genre of portraiture. Baldridge's works are often accompanied by narratives written in a very purple and baroque prose which serve to describe the point of peripety represented in the image itself.

He was named by Oxford American magazine in 2012, one of the new "100 superstars of Southern art".

A Pattern of Monstrosity

== Publications ==
- 2008 – The Everywhere Chronicles (artist photography book with writings). Jamie Baldridge. New York: 21st Editions
- 2013 – Almost Fiction. Jamie Baldridge (artist photography book with foreword by Graham Nash) San Francisco: Modernbook Editions

== Exhibitions ==
=== Solo exhibitions ===
- 2008 –Informed Visions, Millenia Fine Art Orlando, Orlando, Florida
- 2009 – Dystopia, Camara Oscura galeria de arte Madrid, Spain
- 2009 – The Everywhere Chronicles, Galerie Utrecht, Amsterdam, Netherlands
- 2010 – Pilgrims & Peregrines, Richard Goodall Gallery, Manchester, United Kingdom
- 2010 – Belle Epoque, Taylor Bercier Fine Art New Orleans, Louisiana
- 2013 – Playing with Arsenic, Camara Oscura galeria de arte, Madrid, Spain
- 2013 – Almost Fiction, Modernbook Gallery, San Francisco, California

=== Two-person exhibitions ===
- 2007 – Jamie Baldridge & Adam Farrington, Taylor Bercier Fine Art, New Orleans, Louisiana
- 2009 – Magic Realism, exhibition with Sergio Fasol, Schneider Contemporary Photography, Chicago, Illinois
- 2012 – VS., exhibition with Bernhard Buhmann, Carbon 12 Gallery, Dubai, United Arab Emirates

=== Selected group exhibitions ===
- 2011 – India Art Summit, Carbon 12 Gallery, New Delhi, India
- 2013–2014 – Decisive Moments, Honolulu Museum of Art, Honolulu, Hawaii
- 2015 – MORPHEE II, Acte2rivegauche, Paris, France
