= Academical Olympia Burschenschaft of Vienna =

The Academical Olympia Burschenschaft of Vienna (German: Wiener akademische Burschenschaft Olympia; officially registered as Akademische Burschenschaft Olympia) is Studentenverbindung in Vienna, that is member of the Deutsche Burschenschaft and the Burschenschaftliche Gemeinschaft.

It practices academic fencing and has a distinct Couleur. Its members are called Olympen.

According to the Documentation Centre of Austrian Resistance it has connections to oragnized networks of Neo-Nazis. It is considered a far-right extremist organization, with former members today active as far-right politicians and activists like Martin Sellner.
