= Carsten Baumann =

Carsten Baumann may refer to:

- Carsten Baumann (footballer, born 1946), German football player
- Carsten Baumann (footballer, born 1974), German football player
