= Buhmann =

Buhmann is a surname. Notable people with the surname include:

- Bernhard Buhmann (born 1979), Austrian painter
- Rainer Buhmann (born 1981), German chess grandmaster
- Stephanie Buhmann (born 1977), German art critic, art historian, and curator

== See also ==
- Bumann
- Burmann
