= Norbert Németh =

Norbert Németh may refer to:

- Norbert Németh (footballer)
- Norbert Nemeth (politician)
