= Baumann Nurseries =

- Native name: Pépinières Baumann
- Industry: Tree nursery
- Founded: 1740; 286 years ago in Bollwiller, France
- Defunct: 1992

Baumann Nurseries (French: Pépinières Baumann) refers to the multinational nurseries operated by the Baumann family of horticulturists which were active in France and the United States. Founded in 1740 in Bollwiller, France, the original firm was among the oldest nurseries in Europe, only ceasing operations in 1992.

In 1856, Eugene A. Baumann, established the American nursery, briefly in Upstate New York, then Morissania, Bronx, before moving to Rahway, New Jersey, where the firm J.R. Baumann, Inc. was operated until the 1970s by his descendants. In 1956, the original site of the nursery, was sold to a real estate developer.
