= Konzerthaus, Vienna =

Concert hall in Vienna, Austria

Vienna Concert Hall
- Wiener Konzerthaus
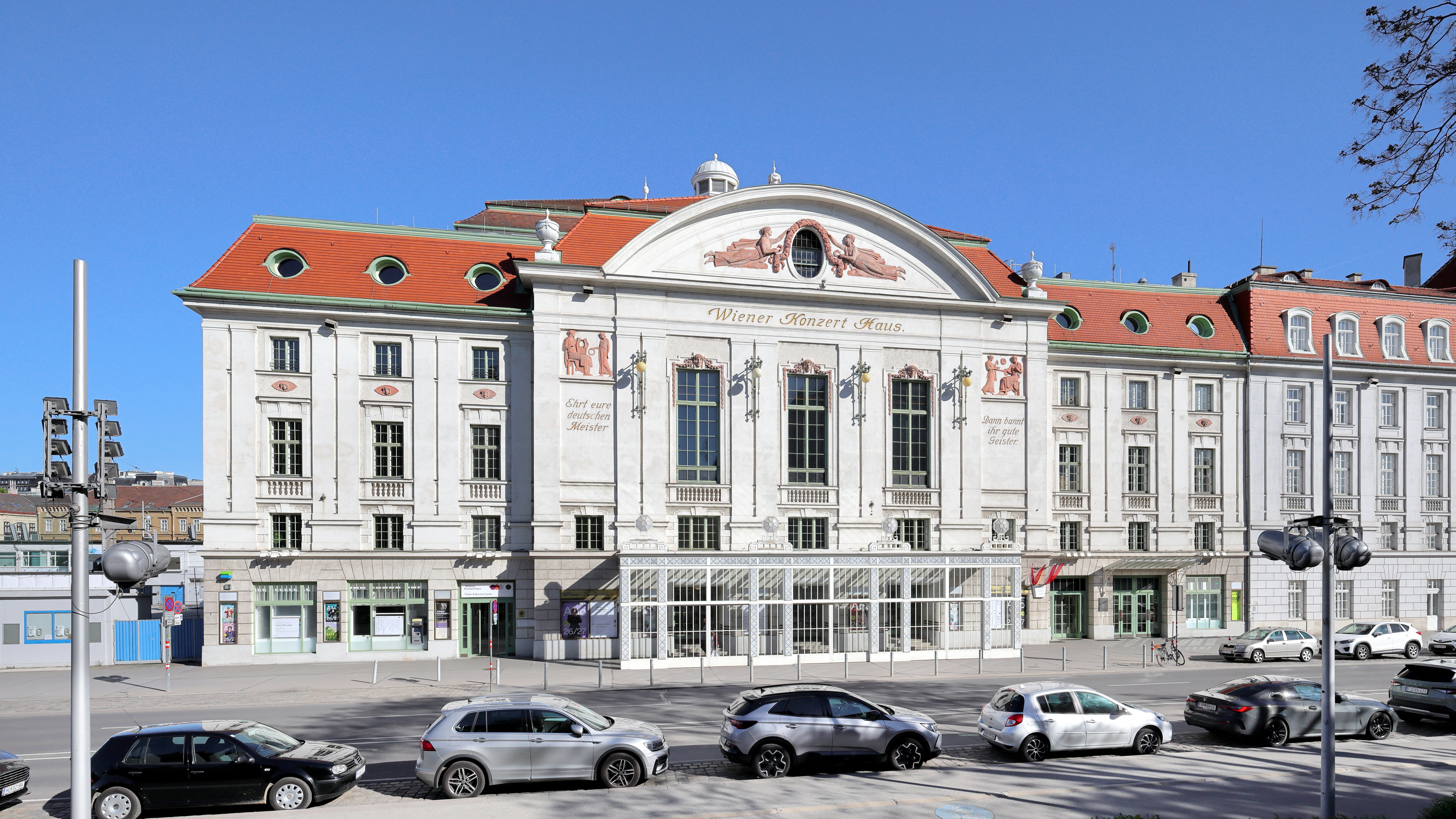
- Wiener Konzerthaus in 2026
- Interactive map of the Vienna Concert Hall area

General information
- Location: Vienna, Austria
- Coordinates: 48°12′02″N 16°22′37″E
- Opened: 19 October 1913

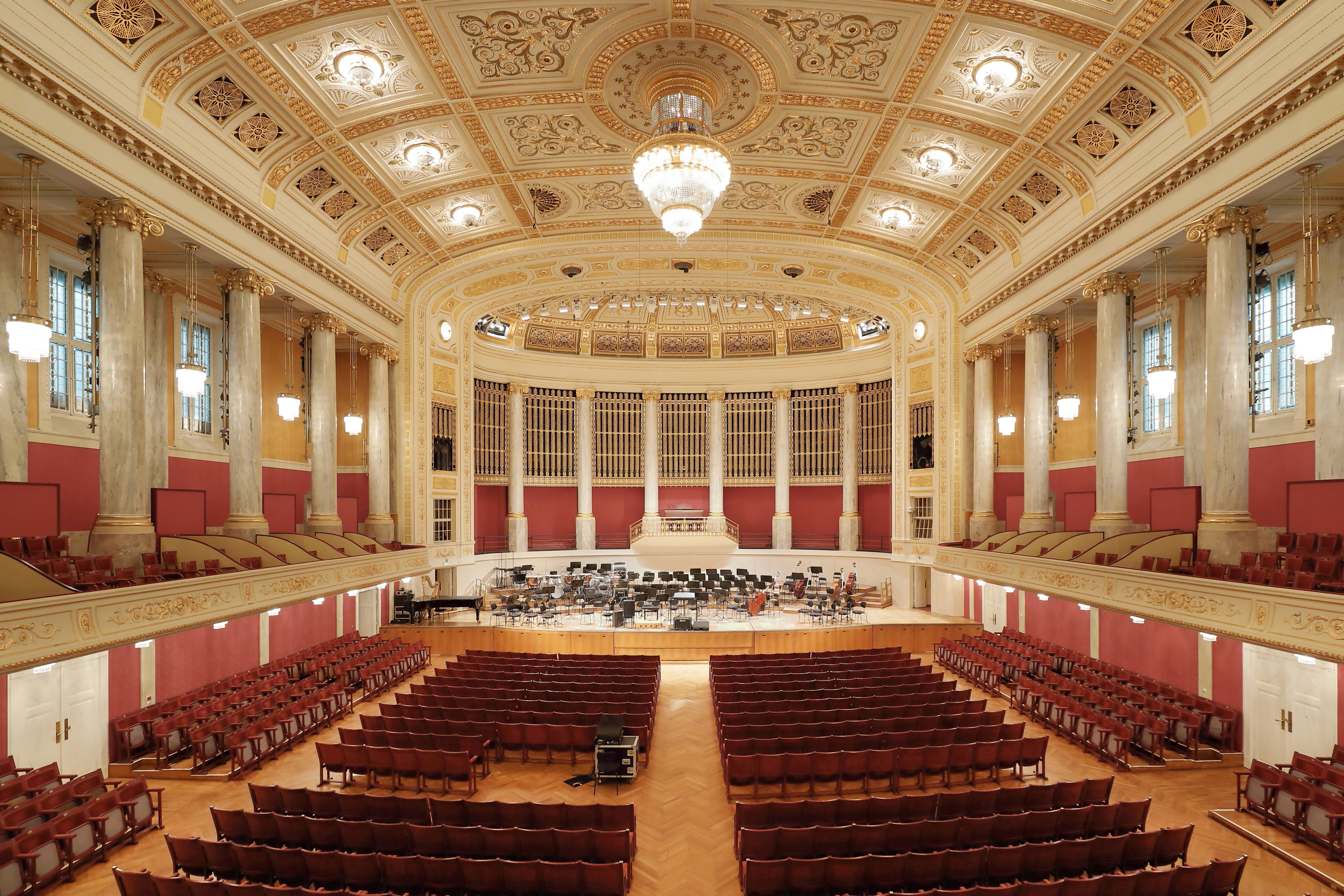
Great Hall

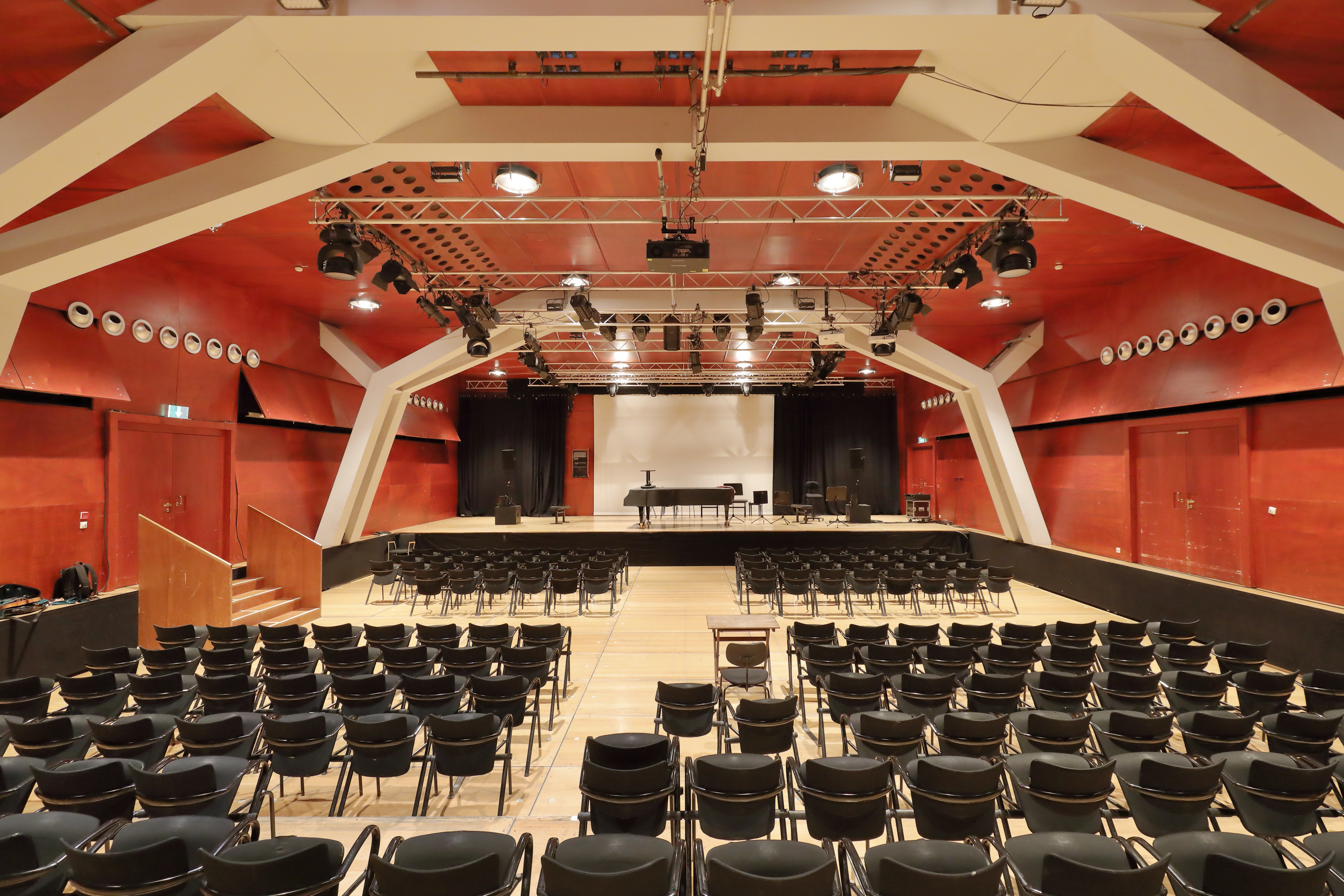
Berio Hall, built 1998-2001

The Konzerthaus is a concert hall located in Vienna, Austria, which opened in 1913. It is situated in the third district just at the edge of the first district in Vienna. Since it was founded it has always tried to emphasise both traditional and innovative musical styles.

In 1890, the first ideas for a Haus für Musikfeste (House for music festivals) came about. The idea of the new multi-purpose building was to be more interesting to the broader public than the traditional Vienna Musikverein. In addition to the concert hall, the first drawings by Ludwig Baumann for the Olympion included an ice-skating area and a bicycle club. In an attached open air area, 40,000 visitors would be able to attend events. Although the drawings were not accepted, today an ice skating area is situated right next to the building.

The Konzerthaus was finally built between 1911 and 1913. The architects were Fellner & Helmer; the work was done in cooperation with Ludwig Baumann.

== Performance facilities ==
The building is about 70 meters by 40 meters in size. It originally had three halls; as the halls were soundproofed, there can be up to three simultaneous concerts. The original Art Nouveau building was partly destroyed during renovations and adaptions, but the building was reconstructed from original sketches in the 1970s. A historic organ was installed in the Konzerthaus by the Austrian firm Rieger in 1913. Between 1997 and 2000, the house was completely renovated.

- Großer Saal (Great Hall), with 1,840 seats
- Mozartsaal (Mozart Hall), with 704 seats
- Schubertsaal (Schubert Hall), with 336 seats
- Berio Saal (Berio Hall) was added during the latest renovations and seats up to 400 people

== Program ==
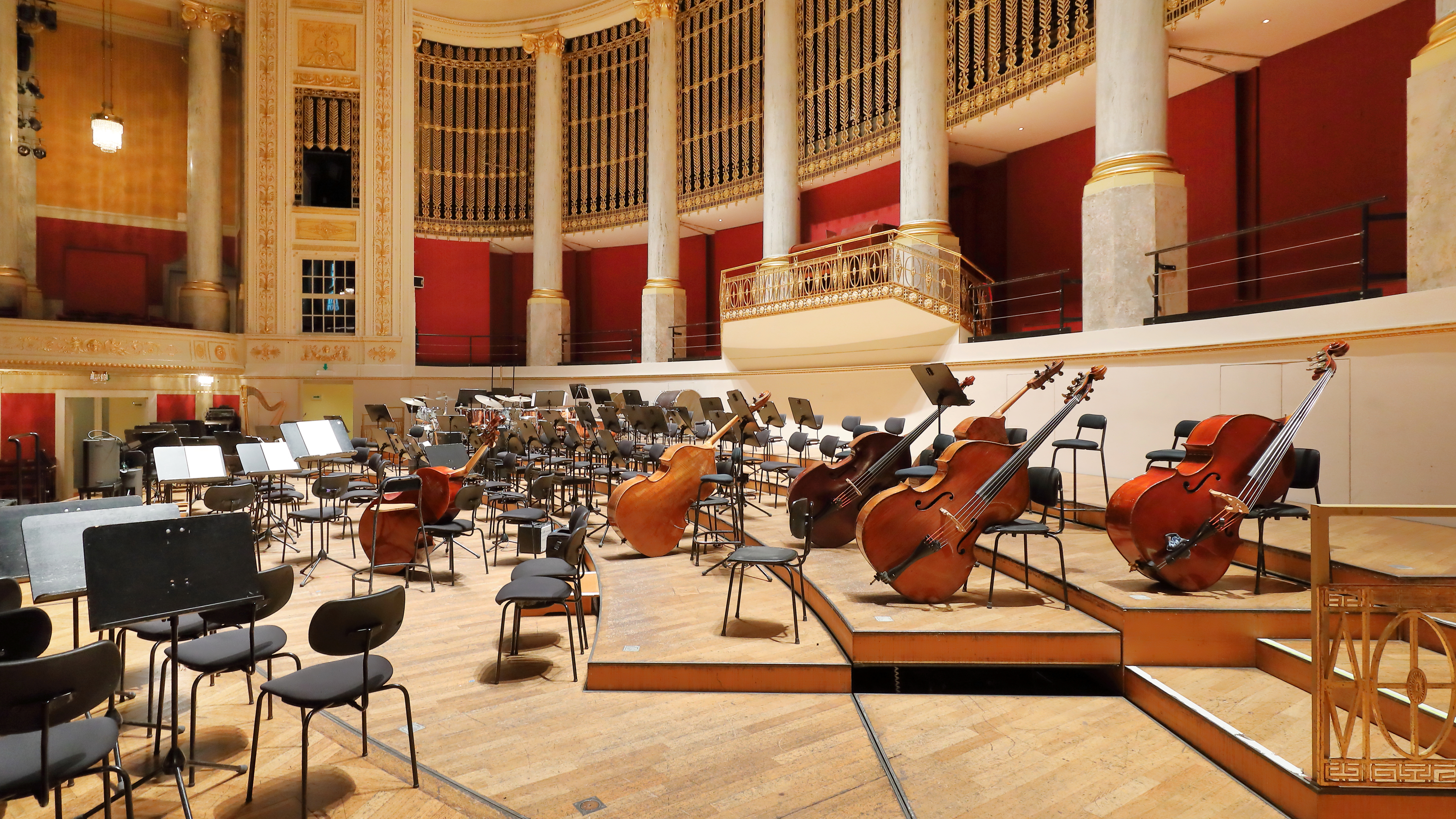
The podium in the Great Hall of the Vienna Konzerthaus

The Konzerthaus has the Vienna Symphony, the Vienna Chamber Orchestra, the Wiener Singakademie and the Klangforum Wien in residence. Several subscriptions also include concerts by the Vienna Philharmonic and other organizations.

The Wiener Konzerthausgesellschaft also conducts several festivals during the year:

- Early Music Festival Resonanzen in January
- the Vienna Spring Festival Wiener Frühlingsfestival in April and May
- the Internationale Musikfest in May and June
- Wien Modern in the Fall

== Directors ==
- Hugo Botstiber (1913–1938)
- Armin Caspar Hochstetter (1938–1945)
- Friedrich Reidinger (1940–1945) (representing Hochstetter, excused for military service)
- Egon Seefehlner (1946–1961)
- Peter Weiser (1961–1977)
- Hans Landesmann (1978–1984)
- Alexander Pereira (1984–1991)
- Karsten Witt (1991–1996)
- Christoph Lieben-Seutter (1996–2007)
- Bernhard Kerres (2007–present)

== History ==
The Historic Concert for the Benefit of Widows and Orphans of Austrian and Hungarian Soldiers was held at the Konzerthaus on January 12, 1918. Its patrons were Kaiser Charles and Empress Zita, with posters designed by Josef Divéky.

The founding convention of Ze'ev Jabotinsky's New Zionist Organization was held at the Konzerthaus in September 1935.

== Awards ==
- Zero Project Awardee 2023 - SommerMusikWoche – Inclusive Music Programme

== Bibliography ==
- Barta, Erwin, Das Wiener Konzerthaus zwischen 1945 und 1961. Eine vereinsgeschichtliche und musikwirtschaftliche Studie. Schneider, Tutzing 2001 ISBN 3-7952-1037-2
