= Egon Seefehlner =

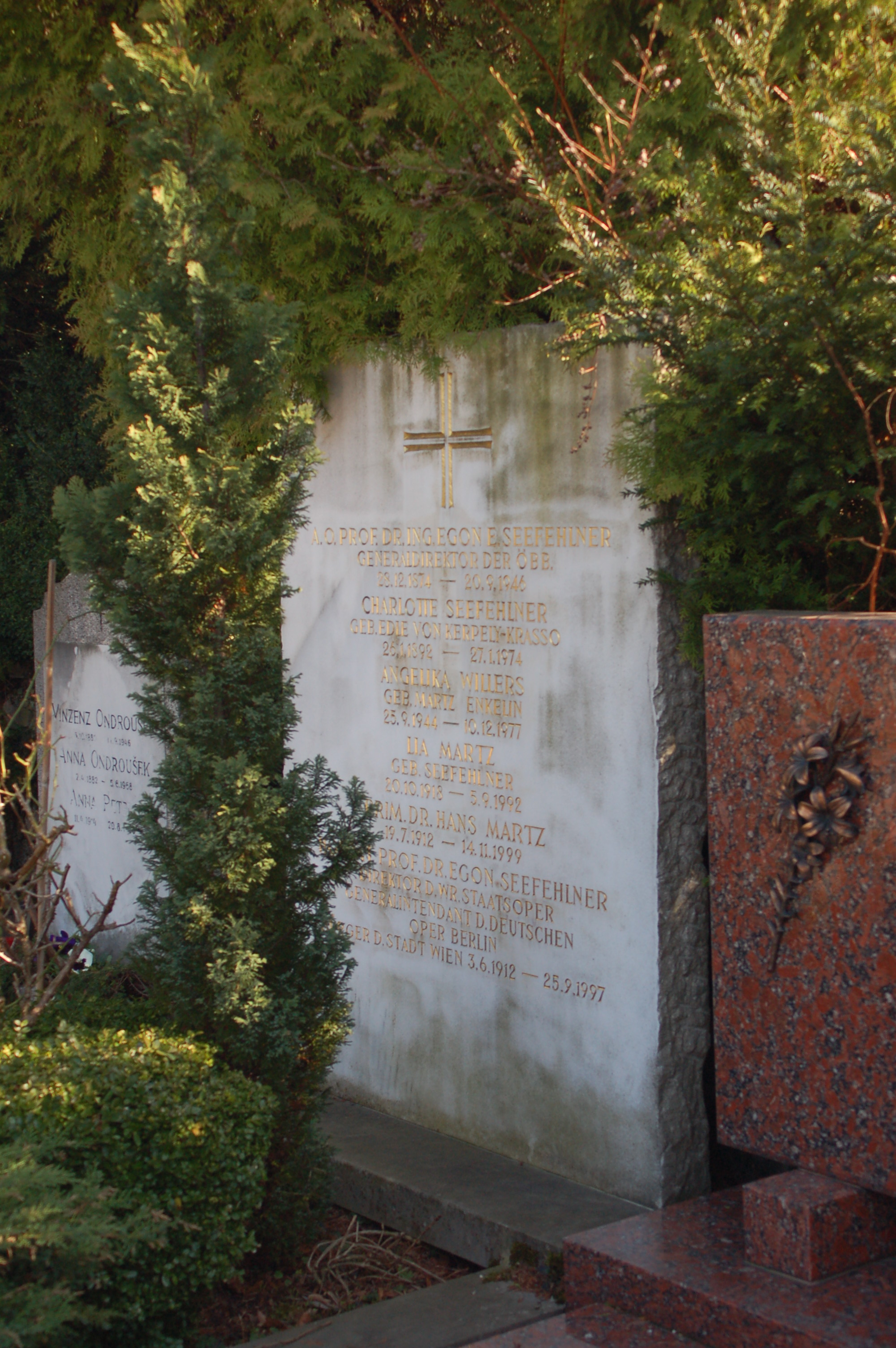

Egon Seefehlner (3 June 1912, in Vienna – 25 September 1997) was an Austrian lawyer, editor and opera director.

Seefehlner was born in Vienna, Austria. He was a student at Konsularakademie Wien (re-established in 1964 as Diplomatic Academy of Vienna) and studied law at the University of Vienna. From 1938 to 1943 Seefehlner worked in the economic department of AEG, Berlin. In 1945, he returned to Vienna, where he served as editor-in-chief of Der Turm magazine until 1948. From 1946 to 1961, he was executive chairman of the Wiener Konzerthaus. In 1949 he founded Jeunesse - Musikalische Jugend Österreichs, the Austrian subdivision of Jeunesses Musicales International. He also served as assistant director of the Wiener Staatsoper from 1954 to 1961. In addition, he was the cultural advisor of the federal party management of the Austrian People's Party from 1945 to 1963 and general secretary of the Austrian Cultural Association, which he co-founded. In 1961, he moved back to Berlin to become assistant director of the Deutsche Oper. From 1972 to 1976, he served as general director. From 1976 to 1982 and 1984 to 1986, he was director of the Vienna State Opera.

He was buried in an honorary grave at Neustift cemetery (group N, row 1, number 44).
