= Château de Bollwiller =

Château in Haut-Rhin, Alsace, France

Coordinates: 47°51′44″N 7°15′37″E

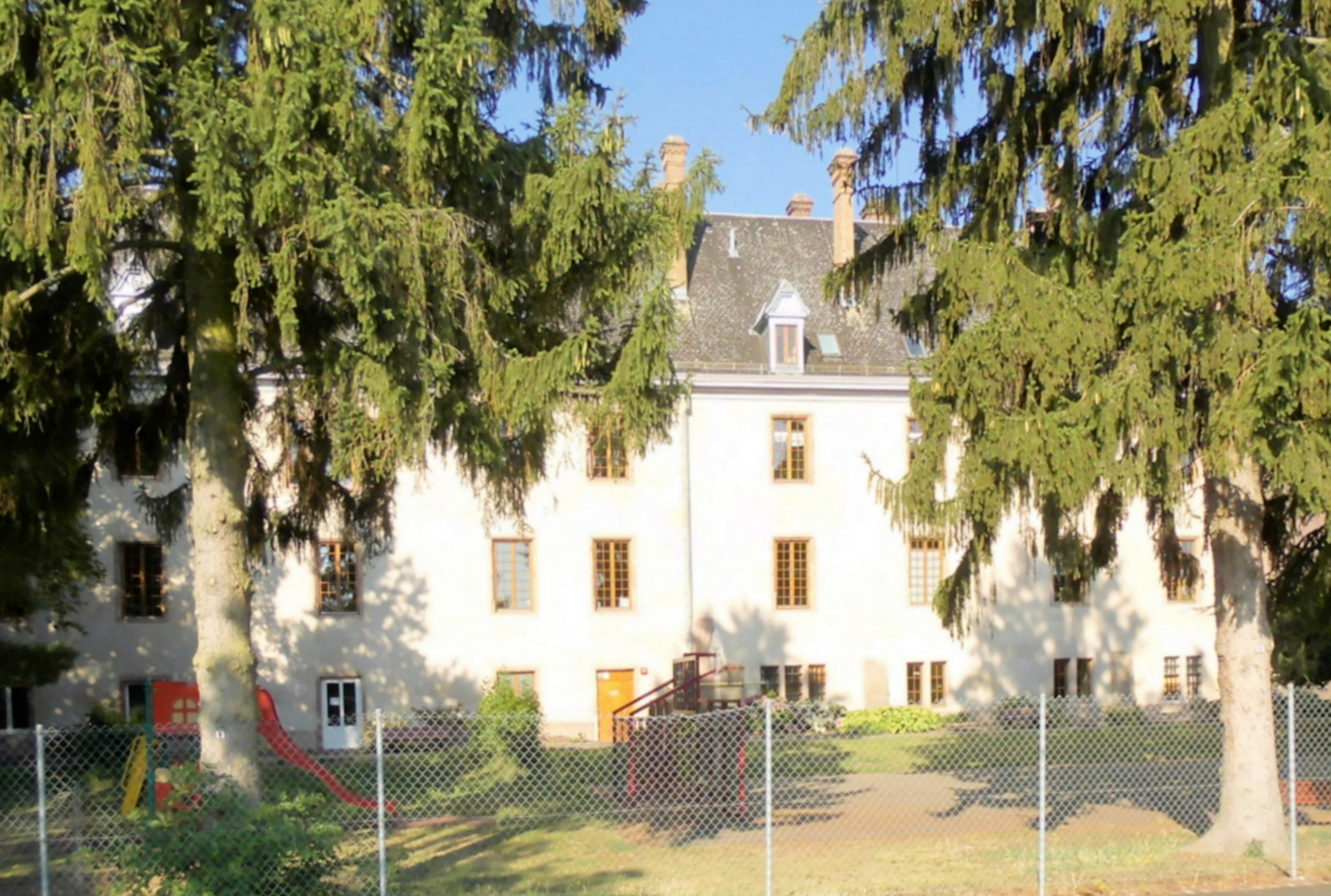
View from the east

The Château de Bollwiller is a château in the commune of Bollwiller, in the department of Haut-Rhin, Alsace, France.

Dated to 1589, it became a Monument historique in 2007. It is currently an Institut médicoéducatif, a facility for handicapped children.
