= Christian Wirth (politician) =

German politician

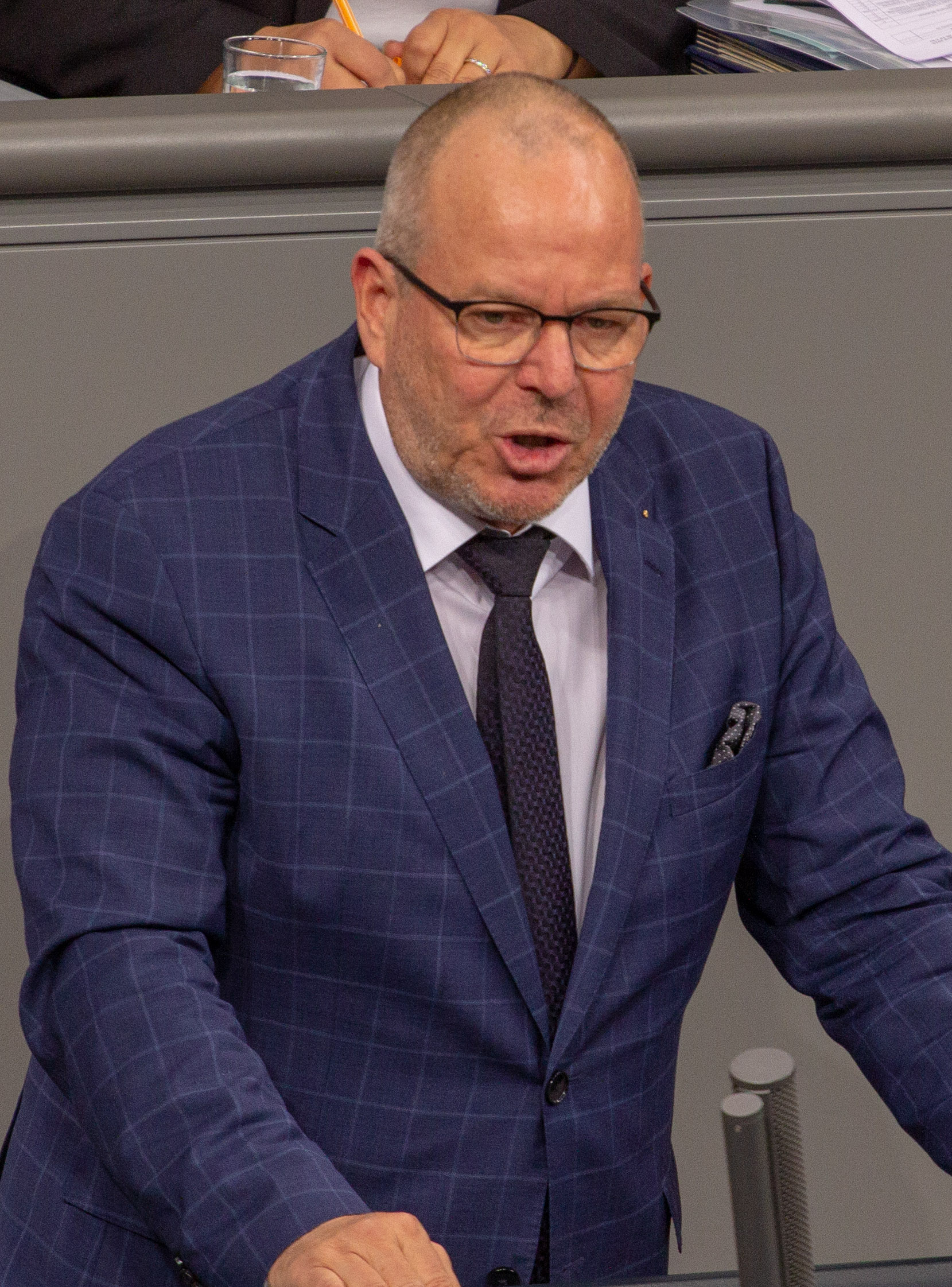
- Wirth in 2019

Member of the Bundestag
- Incumbent
- Assumed office 24 October 2017

Personal details
- Born: 27 April 1963 (age 62)
- Party: AfD

Christian Wirth (born 27 April 1963) is a German politician for the Alternative for Germany (AfD) and since 2017 member of the Bundestag.

== Life and politics ==
Wirth was born 1963 in the West German town of Neunkirchen and studied jurisprudence in order to become a lawyer. Wirth entered the populist AfD in 2015 and became a member of the Bundestag after the 2017 German federal election. He was member of the academic fencing fraternity 'Burschenschaft Normannia zu Heidelberg'.
