= Peter Baumann (disambiguation) =

Peter Baumann may also refer to:

- Peter Baumann (born 1953), German musician with Tangerine Dream
- Peter Baumann (computer scientist) (born 1960), German computer scientist and professor
- Peter Baumann (born 1968), known as DJ BoBo, Swiss singer, songwriter, rapper, dancer, and music producer
- Peter Baumann (philosopher), German philosopher
- Peter Baumann (psychiatrist) (1935–2011), Swiss physician known for participating in assisted suicides
