= Höslwang =

- Municipality
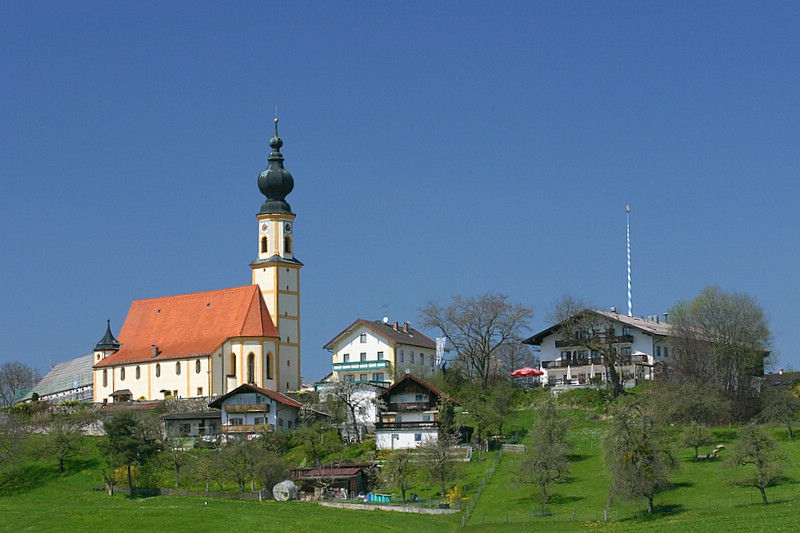
- Höslwang in spring

- Coat of arms

- Location of Höslwang within Rosenheim district
- Interactive map of Höslwang
- Location within Germany Location within Bavaria
- Coordinates: 47°57′15″N 12°19′47″E
- Country: Germany
- State: Bavaria
- Admin. region: Oberbayern
- District: Rosenheim
- Municipal assoc.: Halfing

Government
  - Mayor (2020–26): Johann Murner

Area
  - Total: 16.18 km^{2} (6.25 sq mi)
- Elevation: 594 m (1,949 ft)

Population (2025-12-31)
  - Total: 1,189
  - Density: 73.49/km^{2} (190.3/sq mi)
- Time zone: UTC+01:00 (CET)
  - Summer (DST): UTC+02:00 (CEST)
- Postal codes: 83129
- Dialling codes: 08055
- Vehicle registration: RO
- Website: www.hoeslwang.de

Höslwang is a municipality in the district of Rosenheim in Bavaria in Germany.
