= Halfing (Verwaltungsgemeinschaft) =

- Verwaltungsgemeinschaft
- Location of Halfing within Rosenheim district
- Interactive map of Halfing
- Location within Germany Location within Bavaria
- Coordinates: 47°57′N 12°17′E
- Country: Germany
- State: Bavaria
- Admin. region: Upper Bavaria
- District: Rosenheim
- Seat: Halfing
- Subdivisions: 3 municipalities

Area
  - Total: 52.56 km^{2} (20.29 sq mi)

Population (2025-12-31)
  - Total: 5,292
  - Density: 100.7/km^{2} (260.8/sq mi)
- Time zone: UTC+01:00 (CET)
  - Summer (DST): UTC+02:00 (CEST)
- Website: www.vg-halfing.de

Halfing is a Verwaltungsgemeinschaft (municipal association) in the district of Rosenheim in Bavaria, Germany. Its seat is in Halfing.

It consists of the following municipalities:

1. Halfing
2. Höslwang
3. Schonstett
