= Susanne Fürst =

Austrian politician (born 1969)

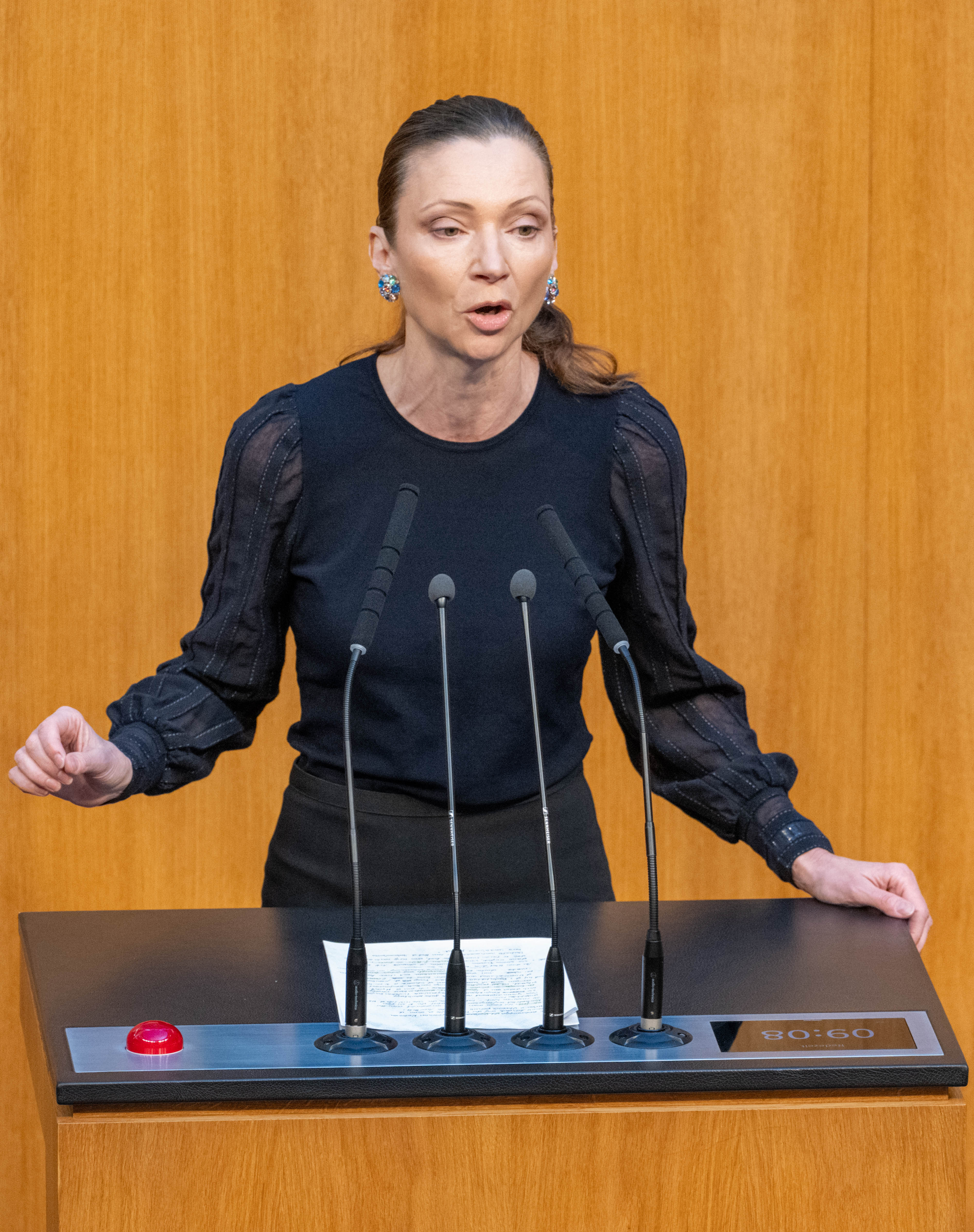
- Susanne Fürst in 2026

Member of the National Council
- Incumbent
- Assumed office 9 November 2017
- Constituency: Greater Linz

Personal details
- Born: 3 May 1969 (age 56)
- Party: Freedom Party

Susanne Fürst (born 3 May 1969) is an Austrian politician of the Freedom Party. She has been a member of the National Council since 2017, and has served as deputy group leader of the Freedom Party since 2019.
