= Hugo Botstiber =

Austrian Jewish musicologist

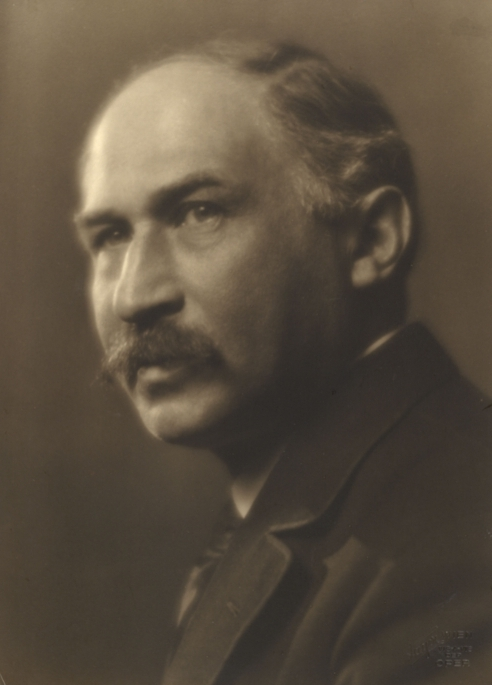
Hugo Botstiber Portrait

Hugo Botstiber (21 April 1875 in Vienna – 15 January 1941 in Shrewsbury, UK) was an Austrian Jewish musicologist, who studied under Robert Fuchs and Guido Adler. He was the secretary general of the Wiener Konzerthaus. In 1938, he left Nazi Austria.

== Literary works ==
- Beethoven im Alltag, 1927;
- J. Haydn, 1927 (the 3rd volume for the work of Carl Ferdinand Pohl, based on the notes of him);
- He revised the "Musikbuch aus Österreich" between 1904 and 1911;
