= Vienna Spring Festival =

Annual classical music festival

Coordinates: 48°12′02″N 16°22′37″E

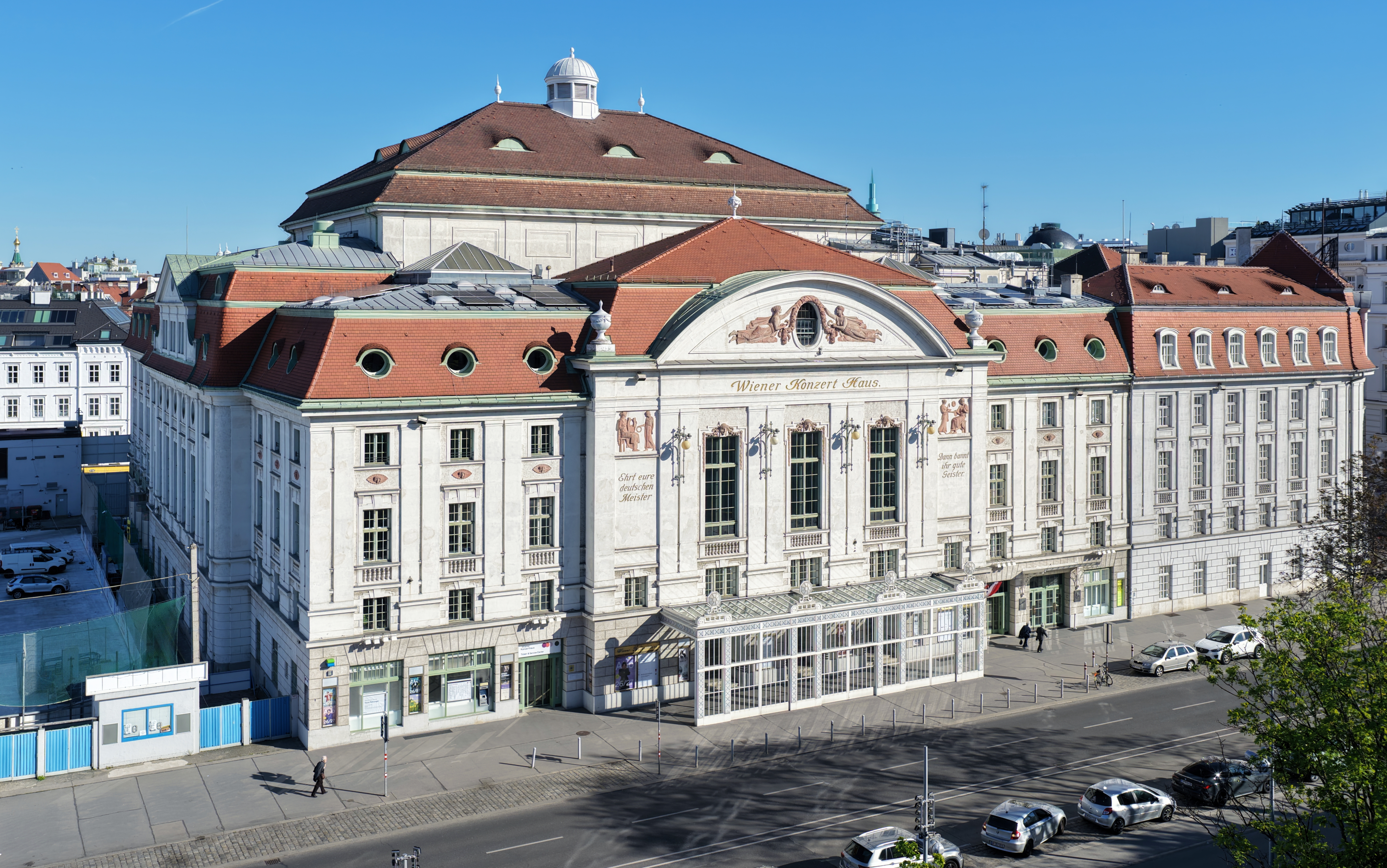
- Wiener Konzerthaus in 2026
- Genre: Classical
- Dates: April–May
- Locations: Vienna, Austria
- Years active: 1992–present

The Vienna Spring Festival (German: Wiener Frühlingsfestival) is an annual classical music festival in Vienna. Founded in 1992, the festival is held in April and May at the Konzerthaus and other venues in Vienna.
