= Dietmar Keck =

Austrian politician (born 1957)

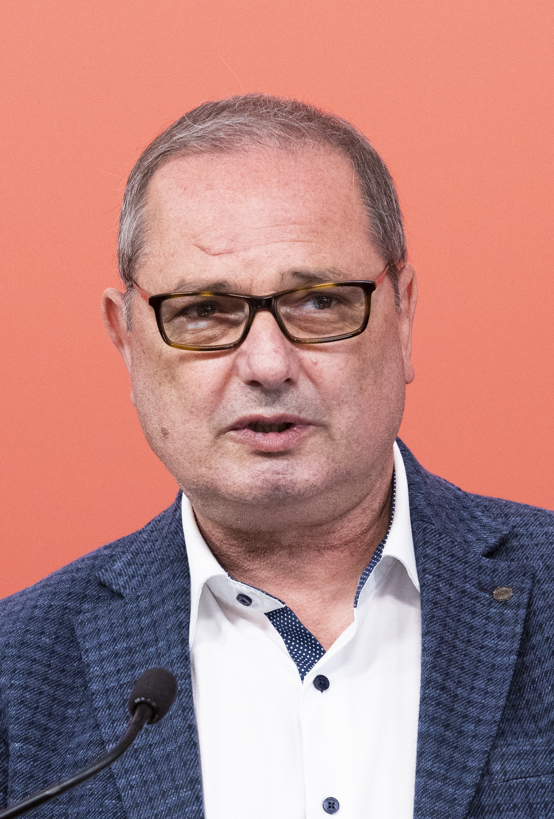
- Keck in June 2021

Member of the National Council
- Incumbent
- Assumed office 20 December 2002
- Constituency: Greater Linz

Personal details
- Born: 27 April 1957 (age 68) Linz, Austria
- Party: Social Democratic Party

Dietmar Keck (born 27 April 1957) is an Austrian politician and member of the National Council. A member of the Social Democratic Party, he has represented Greater Linz since December 2002.

Keck was born on 27 April 1957 in Linz. After school he trained as a hairdresser at vocational school before completing compulsory military service in 1974. He has worked as a production technician at Voestalpine in Linz since 1978. He has held various positions in the Linz branch of the Social Democratic Party (SPÖ) since 1988. He was elected to the National Council at the 2002 legislative election.

Electoral history of Dietmar Keck
Election	Electoral district	Party	Votes	%	Result
1999 legislative	Greater Linz	Social Democratic Party	1,149	1.60%	Not elected
1999 legislative	Upper Austria	Social Democratic Party	281	0.10%	Not elected
2002 legislative	Greater Linz	Social Democratic Party	3,271	3.78%	Elected
2002 legislative	Upper Austria	Social Democratic Party	332	0.11%	Not elected
2006 legislative	Greater Linz	Social Democratic Party	3,114	3.84%	Elected
2006 legislative	Upper Austria	Social Democratic Party	237	0.08%	Not elected
2008 legislative	Greater Linz	Social Democratic Party	3,263	4.55%	Elected
2008 legislative	Upper Austria	Social Democratic Party	328	0.12%	Not elected
2013 legislative	Greater Linz	Social Democratic Party	2,991	5.00%	Elected
2017 legislative	Greater Linz	Social Democratic Party	2,905	4.32%	Elected
2017 legislative	Upper Austria	Social Democratic Party	153	0.06%	Not elected
2019 legislative	Greater Linz	Social Democratic Party	2,993	5.99%	Elected
2019 legislative	Upper Austria	Social Democratic Party	282	0.15%	Not elected
