= Klaus Fürlinger =

Austrian politician (born 1965)

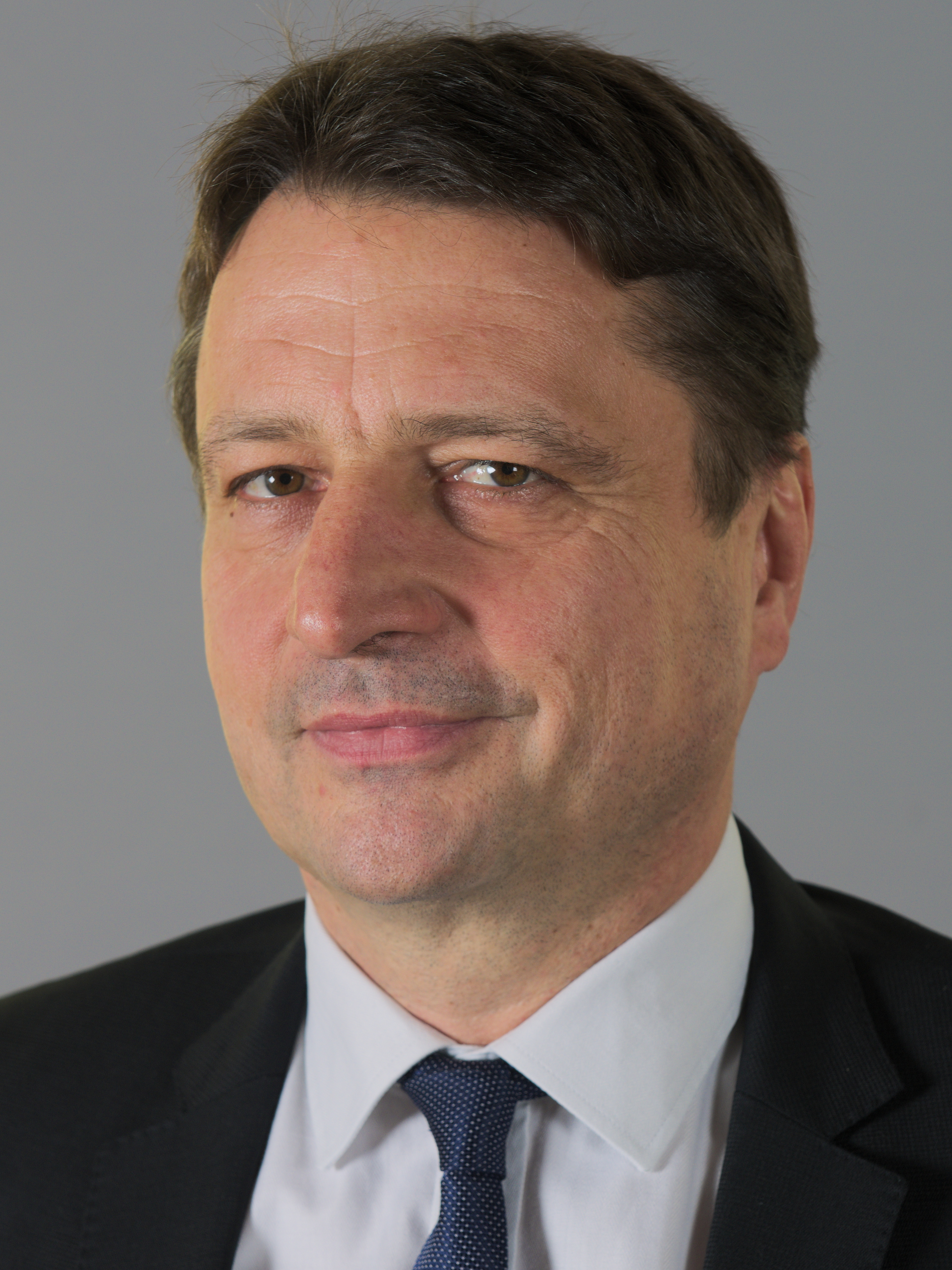
- Fürlinger in 2017

Member of the National Council
- Incumbent
- Assumed office 9 November 2017
- Constituency: Greater Linz

Member of the Federal Council
- In office 5 July 2012 – 8 November 2017
- Nominated by: Landtag of Upper Austria
- Succeeded by: Doris Schulz

Personal details
- Born: 1 June 1965 (age 60)
- Party: People's Party

Klaus Fürlinger (born 1 June 1965) is an Austrian politician of the People's Party serving as a member of the National Council since 2017. From 2012 to 2017, he was a member of the Federal Council.
