= Bauman =

Bauman is a surname. It may be a respelling of the German name Baumann, or it may be the Russian, Ashkenazi Jewish or Scandinavian spelling of the same name. Notable people with the surname include:

- Casey Bauman (born 2000), American football player
- Christopher Bauman (1982–2005), American wrestler
- David F. Bauman, American judge from New Jersey
- Elise Bauman (born 1990), Canadian actress
- Eric Bauman, creator of eBaum's World
- Jay Bauman, American filmmaker
- Karl Bauman (1892–1937), Soviet politician
- Jared Bauman (fl. 2022), American politician
- Joe Bauman (1922–2005), American baseball player
- Jon Bauman (born 1947), American musician, member of Sha Na Na
- Lorri Bauman, American former basketball player
- Louis Bauman (1875–1950), American minister and writer
- Michael Bauman (1950–2019), American theologian, author, world cycling champion
- Mordecai Bauman (1912–2007), American baritone
- Nikolay Bauman (1873–1905), Russian revolutionary
- Richard Bauman, American folklorist, linguistic anthropologist, and American studies scholar
- Robert Bauman (born 1937), American politician
- Robert J. Bauman, Canadian judge
- Schamyl Bauman (died 1966), Swedish film director
- Zygmunt Bauman (1925–2017), Polish philosopher

== See also ==
- Bowman
