= Roland Baumann =

Austrian politician (born 1992)

Member of the National Council
- Incumbent
- Assumed office 24 October 2024
- Constituency: Greater Linz

Personal details
- Born: 19 November 1992 (age 33) Rohrbach-Berg, Austria
- Party: Social Democratic Party

Roland Baumann (born 19 November 1992) is an Austrian politician and member of the National Council. A member of the Social Democratic Party, he has represented Greater Linz since October 2024.

Baumann was born on 19 November 1992 in Rohrbach-Berg and grew up in Hofkirchen im Mühlkreis. He was an apprentice mechanical engineer at Voestalpine in Linz from 2009 to 2013 and has worked there since then. He has been a member of the works council at Voestalpine since 2017. He also trained at the Chamber for Workers and Employees (AK) for Upper Austria, in the Future Academy (2016–2017) and in the Social Academy (2019–2020).

Baumann has been active in politics since his youth and in 2013 became chairman of the youth wing of the PRO-GE trade union in Upper Austria. He has been a member of the municipal council in Linz since 2021. He was elected to the National Council at the 2024 legislative election.

Electoral history of Roland Baumann
| Election | Electoral district | Party | Votes | % | Result |
|---|---|---|---|---|---|
| 2024 legislative | Greater Linz | Social Democratic Party | 3,298 | 7.05% | Elected |
| 2024 legislative | Upper Austria | Social Democratic Party | 346 | 0.20% | Not elected |
