= Schonstett =

- Municipality
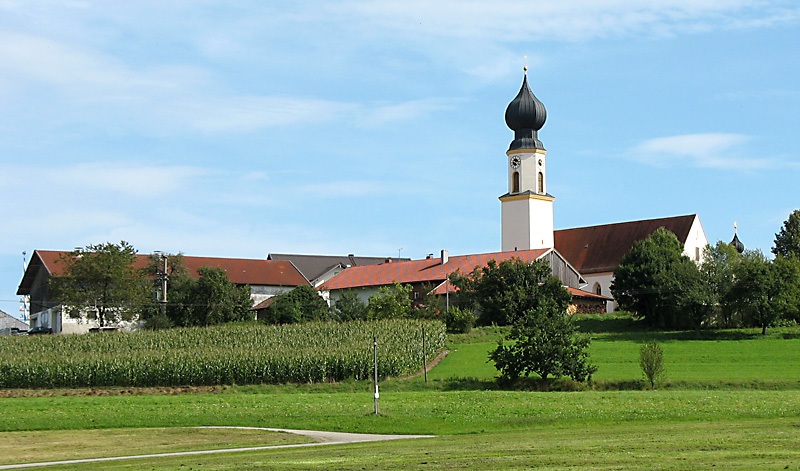
- Church of Saint John the Baptist

- Coat of arms

- Location of Schonstett within Rosenheim district
- Interactive map of Schonstett
- Location within Germany Location within Bavaria
- Coordinates: 47°59′N 12°15′E
- Country: Germany
- State: Bavaria
- Admin. region: Oberbayern
- District: Rosenheim
- Municipal assoc.: Halfing

Government
  - Mayor (2020–26): Paul Dirnecker

Area
  - Total: 13.60 km^{2} (5.25 sq mi)
- Elevation: 492 m (1,614 ft)

Population (2025-12-31)
  - Total: 1,411
  - Density: 103.8/km^{2} (268.7/sq mi)
- Time zone: UTC+01:00 (CET)
  - Summer (DST): UTC+02:00 (CEST)
- Postal codes: 83137
- Dialling codes: 08055
- Vehicle registration: RO
- Website: www.schonstett.de

Schonstett is a municipality in the district of Rosenheim in Bavaria in Germany.

== History ==
In the Middle Ages, Schonstett was the capital of the dominion of the Baron of Schleich. In the course of the 1818 administrative reform in Bavaria Schonstett became an independent municipality.

== Culture and sights ==
- Saint John the Baptist (parish church)
- Castle and castle gardens

== Sports ==
- SV Schonstett
- Schloßschützen (marksmen)

== Education ==
- Grundschule Schonstett (elementary school)
- Kindergarten "Fridolin Pusteblume" (nursery)

== Youth ==
- KLJB Schonstett (for Catholic rural youth)
