= August Christian Baumann =

Norwegian politician

August Christian Baumann (25 May 1770 – 3 November 1831) was a Norwegian mine superintendent and politician.

Baumann was born in Bodenseich near Lüneburg in Germany. He came to Norway and Kristiania in his youth, and was hired as head dispenser at a pharmacy. Baumann eventually became acquainted with Bernt Anker, who recommended the study of mining. Baumann carried through the studies, and became a mine superintendent for Southeastern Norway. In 1816, when the Kongsberg Silver Mines were reopened, Baumann was elected as a member of the board of directors.

He served as a deputy representative to the Norwegian Parliament in 1821, representing the constituency of Kongsberg. He met in parliamentary sessions whenever the regular member, Hans Wølner Kofoed, was unable to do so.
