= Fred Baumann =

American philosopher

Fred E. Baumann

Education
- Education: Harvard University (PhD), Cornell University (BA)

Philosophical work
- Era: 21st-century philosophy
- Region: Western philosophy
- Institutions: Kenyon College
- Main interests: humanism, fraternity, political reciprocity

Fred E. Baumann is an American political philosopher and professor at Kenyon College where he was the Harry M. Clor Professor of Political Science. He is known for his work on humanism, punishment, fraternity, and political reciprocity.

== Books ==
- Fraternity and Politics: Choosing One's Brothers, Bloomsbury Academic, 1998
- Human Rights and American Foreign Policy: Essays (ed.), Kenyon College, 1982
- Democratic Capitalism?: Essays in Search of a Concept (ed.), University Press of Virginia, 1986
- American Defense Policy and Liberal Democracy, edited with Kenneth M. Jensen, University Press of Virginia, 1989
- Crime and Punishment: Issues in Criminal Justice, edited with Kenneth M. Jensen, University Press of Virginia, 1989
- Religion and Politics, edited with Kenneth M. Jensen, University Press of Virginia, 1989
- Philosophy and Law: Essays Toward the Understanding of Maimonides and His Predecessors, Leo Strauss, English trans. by Fred Baumann (of Philosophie und Gesetz, 1935.) Philadelphia: Jewish Publication Society, 1987
- Essays on Politics and Contemporary Human (in Persian), Tehran: Naqde Farhang, 2025
