= Albert Baumann =

Swiss sport shooter

Albert Baumann was a Swiss sport shooter. He competed at the 1896 Summer Olympics in Athens. Baumann competed in the military rifle event. He placed eighth with a score of 1,294.
