= Ludwig Baumann =

German operatic bass-baritone

Ludwig Baumann (born 1950 in Rosenheim) is a German operatic bass-baritone. He is also the founder and director of the Gut Immling Chiemgau opera festival in Halfing.

== Life ==
Ludwig Baumann grew up on a farm surrounded by numerous animals, an environment that, from an early age, fostered his love of animals, particularly horses.

After completing his schooling, he initially studied singing at the Richard Strauss Conservatory in Munich. Following graduation, he secured permanent engagements in Los Angeles, Rome, the Bavarian State Opera in Munich, Düsseldorf, Coburg, the Gärtnerplatz Theatre in Munich, and in Cologne. He also appeared as a guest artist on many of the world's leading opera stages, including the Deutsche Oper Berlin, the Semperoper in Dresden, the Paris Opera, and numerous festivals. His repertoire was highly diverse; however, the role of Papageno in Wolfgang Amadeus Mozart's The Magic Flute was his favourite, a part he performed more than 300 times. In addition, he appeared in numerous concert halls under the direction of distinguished conductors.

Ludwig Baumann is also an interpreter of traditional folk songs and popular folk music. In 1986, he entered the inaugural Grand Prix der Volksmusik with the song Heimat ist ... ("Home Is ..."), although the piece did not reach the final. The song was subsequently recorded by other performers, including Günter Wewel.

In 1994, a stage accident brought Baumann's operatic career to a halt. He subsequently withdrew to the Immling Estate, situated between Bad Endorf and Halfing in the Chiemgau region. There, he relocated the animals from his parents' farm in Aising near Rosenheim. The estate became home to more than 100 horses, as well as donkeys, goats, sheep, cats, dogs, birds, rabbits, and pot-bellied pigs.

Since 1994, Baumann has organised workshops and concerts in the Rosenheim area. In 1997, he founded the International Music Festival at Gut Immling in Chiemgau, which was inaugurated in the riding hall of his estate. The festival has since become an annual event, attracting opera enthusiasts from across the region and beyond to the shores of Lake Chiemsee. As part of the festival, Baumann stages operas for both children and adults, including productions such as Mozart's The Magic Flute and Smetana's The Bartered Bride. In recent years, he has also returned to the stage as a performer at gala concerts.

Baumann is married to the conductor and church musician Cornelia von Kerssenbrock (born 1970).

== Honors ==
- 2011: Order of Merit of the Federal Republic of Germany.
- 2019: Pocci Prize of the Franz Graf von Pocci Society e. V.
- 2024: Pro meritis scientiae et litterarum
