= Philipp Schrangl =

Austrian politician (born 1985)

Member of the National Council
- Incumbent
- Assumed office 29 October 2013
- Constituency: 4A Greater Linz

Personal details
- Born: 14 March 1985 (age 41)
- Party: Freedom Party of Austria

Philipp Schrangl (born 14 March 1985) is an Austrian politician who has been a Member of the National Council for the Freedom Party of Austria (FPÖ) since 2013.
