= Bumann =

Bumann is a German occupational surname for a farmer. Notable people with this name include:

- Dirk Bumann, German infection biologist
- Franz Bumann (1924–2005), Swiss alpine skier
- Kai Bumann (1961–2022), German conductor
