= Hans Baumann =

Hans Baumann may refer to:

- Hans Baumann (handball) (1906–1971), Swiss architect and former President of International Handball Federation
- Hans Baumann (writer) (1914–1988), German poet, songwriter, and author of children's books
- Hans Baumann (bobsleigh) (born 1932), bobsledder who represented West Germany at the 1968 Winter Olympics
- Hans Baumann (inventor) (1930–2025), German-American inventor and engineer
- Hans Baumann (pentathlete) (1905–?), modern pentathlete who represented Switzerland at the 1936 Summer Olympics
- Hans Baumann (photographer) (1893–1985), German photographer, photojournalist, and art collection
- Hans Baumann (skier) (1909–?), skier who represented Austria at the 1936 Winter Olympics
