= Charly Baumann =

German circus animal trainer

- Born: Heinz E. Baumann; 14 September 1928; Berlin, Germany
- Died: 24 January 2001 (aged 72); Sarasota, Florida, United States
- Occupation: Circus animal trainer
- Known for: Tiger training with Ringling Bros. and Barnum & Bailey Circus
- Spouse: Araceli Rodríguez

Charly Baumann (born Heinz E. Baumann; 14 September 1928 – 24 January 2001) was a German animal trainer who worked with Bengal tigers in the Ringling Bros. and Barnum & Bailey Circus.

== Early life ==
Baumann was born in Berlin in 1928. As a child, he appeared in several German films. During the Second World War, his parents were sent to concentration camps for assisting a Jewish family to escape to Spain. His father died at Bergen-Belsen, while his mother survived Ravensbrück.

Towards the end of WWII he was drafted into the German Navy, eventually being captured by American forces shortly before the war ended. After the war Baumann joined Circus Williams in Cologne, where he trained horses and performed in chariot racing scenes.

== Career ==
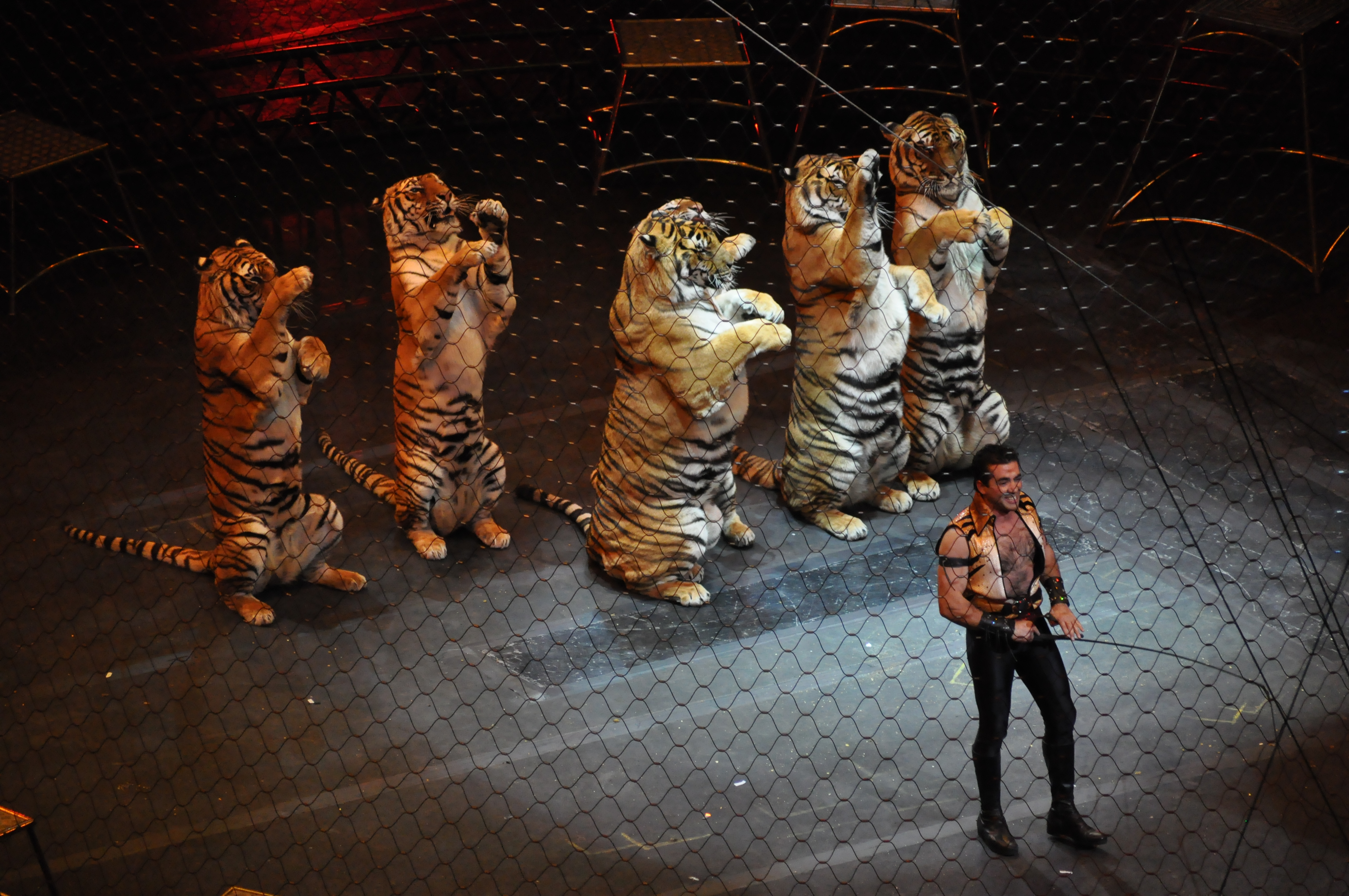
Tiger act at the Ringling Bros. Circus

Baumann began working with lions in the 1950s, eventually becoming known for his calm, non-confrontational training style. In 1957 he turned to tigers, which he considered more graceful and responsive than lions. Baumann likened the transition from lions to tigers to “moving from drums to a violin,” describing tigers as solitary and sensitive animals that required more subtle training techniques than the more communal lions. His empathetic methods contrasted with the more aggressive styles then popular in the circus arena, like that of trainer Clyde Beatty.

He performed widely in Europe, including at Bertram Mills Circus and the Blackpool Tower Circus. In 1964 Baumann moved to the United States, joining Ringling Bros. and Barnum & Bailey, where he expanded his act to as many as 16 tigers. His routines, which included simultaneous rolling, fire hoop jumps and mirrored pedestal acts, became highly influential.

Baumann published his autobiography, Tiger Tiger: My 25 Years With The Big Cats, in 1975.

== Later life and death ==
Baumann retired from performing in 1983 but remained as performance director with Ringling until 1991. He died on 24 January 2001 in Sarasota, Florida, at the age of 72. He was survived by his wife, Araceli Rodríguez.
