= Frank Baumann =

Frank Baumann may refer to:

- Frank Baumann (baseball) (1933–2020), American baseball player
- Frank Baumann (footballer) (born 1975), German football player
