= Alexander Baumann =

Alexander Baumann may refer to:

- Alexander Baumann (aeronautical engineer) (1875–1928), German engineer
- Alex Baumann (born 1964), Canadian athlete
- Alex Baumann (bobsledder) (born 1985), Swiss bobsledder
- Alexander Baumann (curler) (born 1984), German curler
- J. Alexander Baumann (1942–2022), Swiss politician
