= Buddy Baumann =

Buddy Baumann may refer to:

- Buddy Baumann (American football) (1900–1951), American football player
- Buddy Baumann (baseball) (born 1987), American baseball player
