= Ernst Baumann =

Swiss painter and artist

Ernst Baumann (17 April 1909, in Wileroltigen – 9 January 1992, in Basel) was a Swiss painter and artist.

== Selected works ==
- 1945, 1950 Murals at Friedhof am Hörnli and Wolfgottesacker, Basel
- 1956 Mural "Der Frühling" (Spring), Kantonsspital Basel
- 1962 Mosaic "Kind und Natur" (Child and Nature), Erlensträsschen school, Riehen (BS)
- 1965 Mural, government building, Bottmingen (BL)

== Exhibitions ==
- 1952 and 1956 Museum Allerheiligen, Schaffhausen
- 1960 Kunstverein, Olten
- 1955 to 1960 several exhibitions at the Bettie Thommen Gallery, Basel
- 1964 Kunsthalle, Basel
- 1974, 1979 Bodenacker school, Liestal
- 1976 Trubschachen Art Exhibition
- 1982 Bad Homburg vor der Höhe
- 1988 Schweizerische Schifffahrtsschule, Basel
- 1989 Ausstellungsraum Kaserne, Basel
- 1993 Memorial exhibition at Bodenacker school, Liestal
- 1999 Memorial exhibition "Sprützehüsli", Oberwil
- 2001 Trubschachen Art Exhibition
- 2002 Schär und Wildbolz Gallery, Solothurn
