= Benjamin Nolte =

German politician (born 1982)

Member of the Landtag of Bavaria
- Incumbent
- Assumed office 30 October 2023
- Constituency: Upper Bavaria

Personal details
- Born: 4 July 1982 (age 43) Hagen
- Party: Alternative for Germany (since 2013)

Benjamin Dominik Nolte (born 4 July 1982 in Hagen) is a German politician serving as a member of the Landtag of Bavaria since 2023. From February to March 2014, he served as deputy chairman of the Young Alternative for Germany.
