= Bollwiller =

Commune in Grand Est, France

- Commune
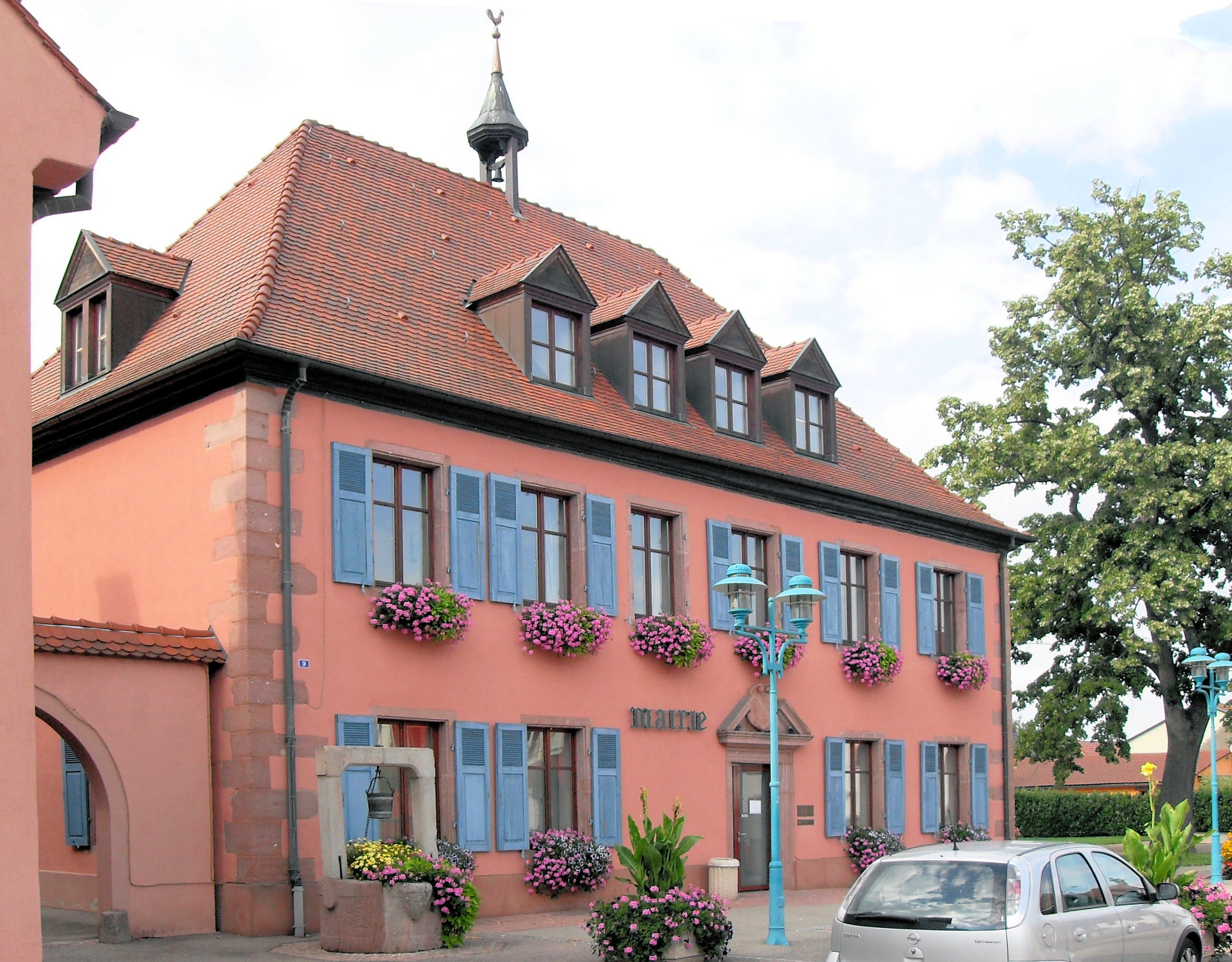
- The town hall in Bollwiller

- Coat of arms
- Location of Bollwiller
- Location within France Location within Grand Est
- Coordinates: 47°51′29″N 7°15′46″E
- Country: France
- Region: Grand Est
- Department: Haut-Rhin
- Arrondissement: Mulhouse
- Canton: Wittenheim
- Intercommunality: Mulhouse Alsace Agglomération

Government
  - Mayor (2020–2026): Jean-Paul Julien
- Area^{1}: 8.63 km^{2} (3.33 sq mi)
- Elevation: 235 m (771 ft)
- Highest elevation: 265 m (869 ft)
- Lowest elevation: 229 m (751 ft)
- Population (2023): 4,184
  - Density: 485/km^{2} (1,260/sq mi)
- Time zone: UTC+01:00 (CET)
  - Summer (DST): UTC+02:00 (CEST)
- INSEE/Postal code: 68043 /68540
- ^{1} French Land Register data, which excludes lakes, ponds, glaciers > 1 km^{2} (0.386 sq mi or 247 acres) and river estuaries.

Bollwiller (French pronunciation: [bɔlvilɛʁ]; German: Bollweiler) is a commune in the Haut-Rhin department in Grand Est in north-eastern France. It forms part of the Mulhouse Alsace Agglomération, the inter-communal local government body for the Mulhouse conurbation. Château de Bollwiller became a Monument historique in 2007.

== Population ==
Historical population
Year	Pop.	±% p.a.
1968	2,846	—
1975	3,007	+0.79%
1982	2,951	−0.27%
1990	3,194	+0.99%
1999	3,552	+1.19%
2007	3,565	+0.05%
2012	3,695	+0.72%
2017	4,027	+1.74%
2023	4,184	+0.64%
Source: INSEE

== Notable people ==
- Eugene A. Baumann (1817–1869), French-American landscape architect

== See also ==
- Communes of the Haut-Rhin department
