= Halfing =

- Municipality
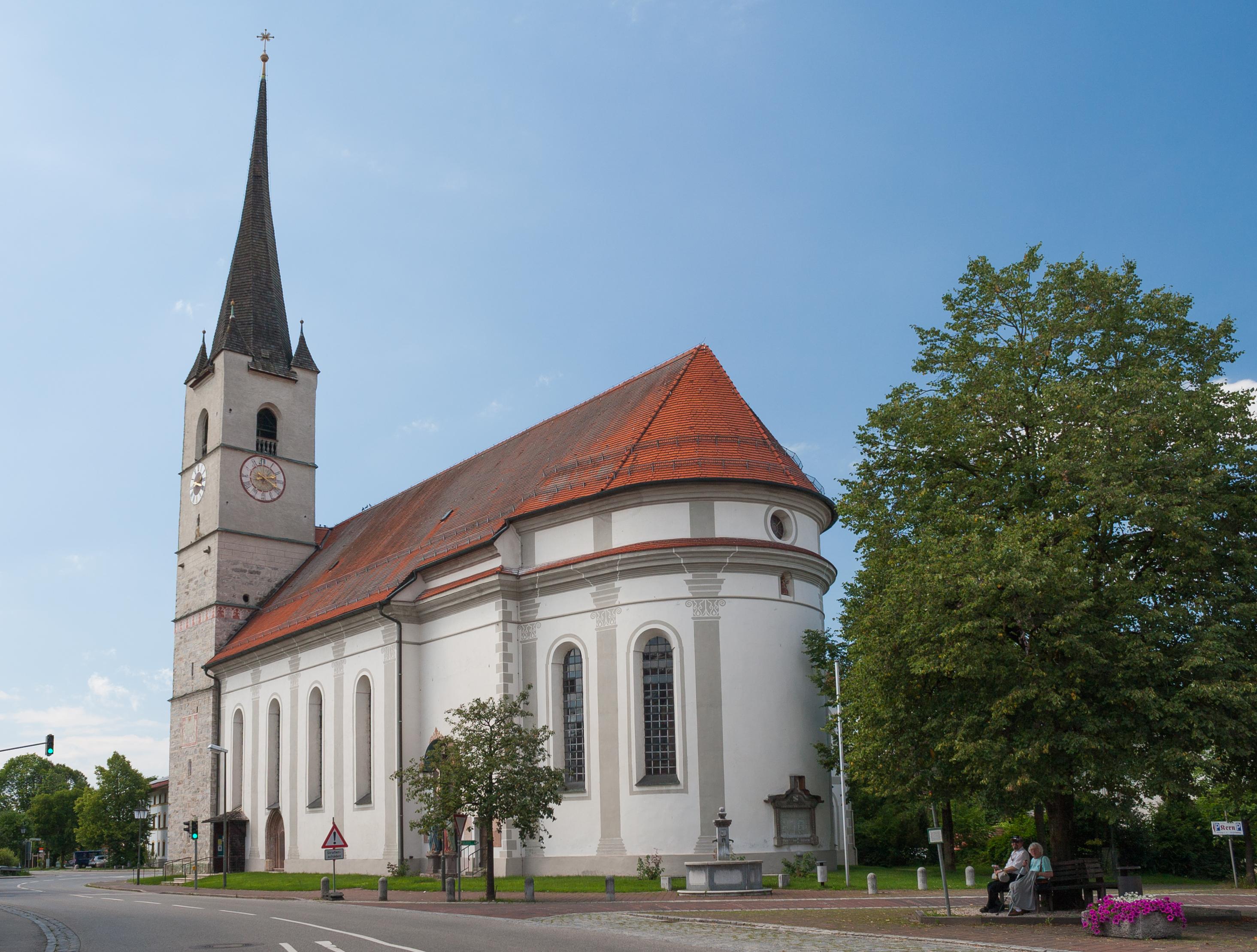
- Parish Church of the Assumption of the Virgin Mary

- Coat of arms

- Location of Halfing within Rosenheim district
- Interactive map of Halfing
- Location within Germany Location within Bavaria
- Coordinates: 47°57′07″N 12°16′35″E
- Country: Germany
- State: Bavaria
- Admin. region: Oberbayern
- District: Rosenheim
- Municipal assoc.: Halfing

Government
  - Mayor (2020–26): Regina Braun (CSU)

Area
  - Total: 22.79 km^{2} (8.80 sq mi)
- Elevation: 502 m (1,647 ft)

Population (2025-12-31)
  - Total: 2,692
  - Density: 118.1/km^{2} (305.9/sq mi)
- Time zone: UTC+01:00 (CET)
  - Summer (DST): UTC+02:00 (CEST)
- Postal codes: 83128
- Dialling codes: 08055
- Vehicle registration: RO
- Website: www.halfing.de

Halfing (German pronunciation: [ˈhalfɪŋ]) is a municipality in the district of Rosenheim in Bavaria in Germany. It is located in the western part of the Chiemgau area, half-way between Chiemsee and Wasserburg am Inn.

== History ==
The village was mentioned first in a deed from 928 when a nobleman gave two villages near Landshut to the archbishop of Salzburg, Adalbert II, in exchange for the village of Halfing and its church. In 1400, Halfing had a local court when it was given by Stephen III as a fief to Ortolf den Laiminger. Halfing was then one of the largest settlements in the western part of Chiemgau. 27 farms belonged to Halfing in 1415, and in 1731, when Halfing became a property of Seeon Abbey, the village had still 26 farms.
