= Heinz Baumann =

Heinz Baumann may refer to:

- Heinz Baumann (actor) (1928–2023), German actor
- Heinz Hubert Baumann (1946–2010), German priest
