= Bouman (surname) =

Bouman is a Dutch surname, a spelling variant of Bouwman. Notable people with the surname include:

- Casper Bouman (born 1985), Dutch sailor
- Charles Bouman, American engineer
- Hendrik Bouman (born 1951), Dutch harpsichordist
- Jan Bouman (1706–1776), Dutch architect
- Katie Bouman (born 1989), American computer scientist
- Kea Bouman (1903–1998), Dutch tennis player
- Piet Bouman (1892–1980), Dutch footballer
- Tara Bouman (born 1970), Dutch musician
- Todd Bouman (born 1972), American football quarterback
