= Pauline Baumann =

British artist

Constance Amy Pauline Baumann (1899–1977) was a British artist known as a painter, printmaker and teacher.

== Biography ==
Pauline Baumann was born in London and was one of six children born to a tailor from Prussia and his English wife. Baumann attended school in Wimbledon before studying art at Saint Martin's School of Art and then, from 1923 to 1927, at the Royal College of Art. After graduating from the Royal College, Baumann remained in London where she held a number of teaching posts while continuing to paint and produce prints using etching and engraving techniques. Between 1929 and 1968 she was a regular exhibitor at the Royal Academy in London and was an active member of the Senefelder Club which highlighted her lithographs. She also exhibited with the Society of Wood Engravers, at the Art Institute of Chicago, the Redfern Gallery and with the Artists' International Association. Cambridge Council, Hertford Council and Southwark Heritage all hold examples of her work.
