= Hermann Baumann =

Hermann Baumann may refer to:

- Hermann Baumann (social anthropologist) (1902–1972), German Africa expert
- Hermann Baumann (musician) (1934–2023), German horn player, teacher and composer
- Hermann Baumann (wrestler) (1921–1999), Swiss Olympic wrestler
