= Peter Baumann (philosopher) =

German philosopher

Education
- Education: University of Göttingen (PhD)
- Thesis: Social Power and Motivation (1992)
- Doctoral advisor: Horst Kern, Wolfgang Carl

Philosophical work
- Era: 21st-century philosophy
- Region: Western philosophy
- Institutions: Swarthmore College
- Main interests: epistemology

Peter Baumann is a German philosopher and Charles and Harriett Cox McDowell Professor of Philosophy and Religion at Swarthmore College. He is known for his work on epistemology.

== Books ==
- Epistemic Contextualism. A Defense, Oxford: Oxford University Press 2016. ISBN 978-0-19-875431-2
- Practical Conflicts. New Philosophical Essays, ed. with Monika Betzler, Cambridge: Cambridge University Press 2004.
- Erkenntnistheorie (Epistemology), Stuttgart: Metzler 2002 (2.ed. 2006; 3.ed. 2015).
