= Greater Linz (National Council electoral district) =

Parliamentary electoral district in Austria

- Linz und Umgebung
- Electoral District for the National Council
- Location of Greater Linz within Austria
- District: List: Linz City; Linz Rural
- State: Upper Austria
- Population: 368,132 (2024)
- Electorate: 245,789 (2019)
- Area: 556 km^{2} (2023)

Current Electoral District
- Created: 1994
- Seats: 7 (1994–present)
- Members: List: Klaus Fürlinger (ÖVP); Susanne Fürst (FPÖ); Dietmar Keck (SPÖ); Agnes Sirkka Prammer (GRÜNE)

Greater Linz (German: Linz und Umgebung), also known as Electoral District 4A (German: Wahlkreis 4A), is one of the 39 multi-member regional electoral districts of the National Council, the lower house of the Austrian Parliament, the national legislature of Austria. The electoral district was created in 1992 when electoral regulations were amended to add regional electoral districts to the existing state-wide electoral districts and came into being at the following legislative election in 1994. It consists of the city of Linz and the district of Linz Rural in the state of Upper Austria. The electoral district currently elects seven of the 183 members of the National Council using the open party-list proportional representation electoral system. At the 2019 legislative election the constituency had 245,789 registered electors.

== History ==
Greater Linz was one 43 regional electoral districts (regionalwahlkreise) established by the "National Council Electoral Regulations 1992" (Nationalrats-Wahlordnung 1992) passed by the National Council in 1992. It consisted of the city of Linz and the district of Linz Rural in the state of Upper Austria. The district was initially allocated seven seats in May 1993.

== Electoral system ==
Greater Linz currently elects seven of the 183 members of the National Council using the open party-list proportional representation electoral system. The allocation of seats is carried out in three stages. In the first stage, seats are allocated to parties (lists) at the regional level using a state-wide Hare quota (wahlzahl) (valid votes in the state divided by the number of seats in the state). In the second stage, seats are allocated to parties at the state/provincial level using the state-wide Hare quota (any seats won by the party at the regional stage are subtracted from the party's state seats). In the third and final stage, seats are allocated to parties at the federal/national level using the D'Hondt method (any seats won by the party at the regional and state stages are subtracted from the party's federal seats). Only parties that reach the 4% national threshold, or have won a seat at the regional stage, compete for seats at the state and federal stages.

Electors may cast one preferential vote for individual candidates at the regional, state and federal levels. Split-ticket voting (panachage), or voting for more than one candidate at each level, is not permitted and will result in the ballot paper being invalidated. At the regional level, candidates must receive preferential votes amounting to at least 14% of the valid votes cast for their party to over-ride the order of the party list (10% and 7% respectively for the state and federal levels). Prior to April 2013 electors could not cast preferential votes at the federal level and the thresholds candidates needed to over-ride the party list order were higher at the regional level (half the Hare quota or 1/6 of the party votes) and state level (Hare quota).

== Election results ==
=== Summary ===
Election	Communists KPÖ+ / KPÖ			Social Democrats SPÖ			Greens GRÜNE			NEOS NEOS / LiF			People's ÖVP			Freedom FPÖ		
Election	Votes	%	Seats	Votes	%	Seats	Votes	%	Seats	Votes	%	Seats	Votes	%	Seats	Votes	%	Seats
2019	1,389	0.77%	0	49,991	27.85%	1	31,023	17.28%	1	15,369	8.56%	0	49,869	27.78%	1	27,420	15.27%	1
2017	1,981	1.03%	0	67,233	34.99%	2	8,686	4.52%	0	10,399	5.41%	0	46,210	24.05%	1	46,052	23.97%	1
2013	2,013	1.11%	0	59,874	33.08%	2	27,136	14.99%	1	8,107	4.48%	0	30,807	17.02%	1	36,909	20.39%	1
2008	1,451	0.76%	0	71,676	37.65%	2	23,588	12.39%	0	3,680	1.93%	0	34,969	18.37%	1	34,949	18.36%	1
2006	1,797	0.98%	0	81,037	44.21%	3	23,213	12.66%	0				45,537	24.84%	1	21,807	11.90%	0
2002	974	0.51%	0	86,490	45.48%	3	20,932	11.01%	0	2,099	1.10%	0	60,711	31.92%	2	18,962	9.97%	0
1999	790	0.44%	0	71,641	39.96%	2	15,380	8.58%	0	7,132	3.98%	0	34,587	19.29%	1	47,637	26.57%	1
1995	515	0.27%	0	90,196	46.82%	3	10,534	5.47%	0	11,540	5.99%	0	38,726	20.10%	1	39,467	20.49%	1
1994	535	0.30%	0	75,150	41.74%	3	16,012	8.89%	0	12,059	6.70%	0	33,301	18.50%	1	40,467	22.48%	1

=== Detailed ===
==== 2010s ====
===== 2019 =====
Results of the 2019 legislative election held on 29 September 2019:

Party		Votes per district			Total votes	%	Seats
Party		Linz City	Linz Rural	Voting card	Total votes	%	Seats
Social Democratic Party of Austria	SPÖ	27,416	22,406	169	49,991	27.85%	1
Austrian People's Party	ÖVP	24,043	25,574	252	49,869	27.78%	1
The Greens – The Green Alternative	GRÜNE	19,356	11,290	377	31,023	17.28%	1
Freedom Party of Austria	FPÖ	13,464	13,863	93	27,420	15.27%	1
NEOS – The New Austria and Liberal Forum	NEOS	8,201	6,997	171	15,369	8.56%	0
JETZT	JETZT	2,066	1,260	31	3,357	1.87%	0
KPÖ Plus	KPÖ+	968	415	6	1,389	0.77%	0
Der Wandel	WANDL	622	372	6	1,000	0.56%	0
Socialist Left Party	SLP	64	29	0	93	0.05%	0
Valid Votes		96,200	82,206	1,105	179,511	100.00%	4
Rejected Votes		957	1,067	5	2,029	1.12%	
Total Polled		97,157	83,273	1,110	181,540	73.86%	
Registered Electors		138,154	107,635		245,789		
Turnout		70.33%	77.37%		73.86%		

The following candidates were elected:

- Party mandates - Klaus Fürlinger (ÖVP), 3,140 votes; Susanne Fürst (FPÖ), 1,305 votes; Leonore Gewessler (GRÜNE), 1,105 votes; and Dietmar Keck (SPÖ), 2,993 votes.

Substitutions:

- Leonore Gewessler (GRÜNE) resigned on 7 January 2020 and was replaced by Agnes Sirkka Prammer (GRÜNE) on 9 January 2020.

===== 2017 =====
Results of the 2017 legislative election held on 15 October 2017:

Party		Votes per district			Total votes	%	Seats
Party		Linz City	Linz Rural	Voting card	Total votes	%	Seats
Social Democratic Party of Austria	SPÖ	38,840	28,059	334	67,233	34.99%	2
Austrian People's Party	ÖVP	22,811	23,078	321	46,210	24.05%	1
Freedom Party of Austria	FPÖ	23,067	22,806	179	46,052	23.97%	1
NEOS – The New Austria and Liberal Forum	NEOS	5,637	4,609	153	10,399	5.41%	0
Peter Pilz List	PILZ	5,438	3,372	118	8,928	4.65%	0
The Greens – The Green Alternative	GRÜNE	5,574	2,993	119	8,686	4.52%	0
My Vote Counts!	GILT	1,195	920	15	2,130	1.11%	0
Communist Party of Austria	KPÖ	1,506	461	14	1,981	1.03%	0
The Whites	WEIßE	149	149	9	307	0.16%	0
Free List Austria	FLÖ	71	77	3	151	0.08%	0
Socialist Left Party	SLP	38	17	0	55	0.03%	0
Valid Votes		104,326	86,541	1,265	192,132	100.00%	4
Rejected Votes		909	800	7	1,716	0.89%	
Total Polled		105,235	87,341	1,272	193,848	78.47%	
Registered Electors		140,037	107,012		247,049		
Turnout		75.15%	81.62%		78.47%		

The following candidates were elected:

- Party mandates - Klaus Fürlinger (ÖVP), 2,829 votes; Dietmar Keck (SPÖ), 2,905 votes; Hermann Krist (SPÖ), 1,801 votes; and Philipp Schrangl (FPÖ), 1,957 votes.

===== 2013 =====
Results of the 2013 legislative election held on 29 September 2013:

Party		Votes per district			Total votes	%	Seats
Party		Linz City	Linz Rural	Voting card	Total votes	%	Seats
Social Democratic Party of Austria	SPÖ	33,229	26,429	216	59,874	33.08%	2
Freedom Party of Austria	FPÖ	19,092	17,683	134	36,909	20.39%	1
Austrian People's Party	ÖVP	14,959	15,582	266	30,807	17.02%	1
The Greens – The Green Alternative	GRÜNE	16,826	9,963	347	27,136	14.99%	1
Team Stronach	FRANK	4,191	4,253	46	8,490	4.69%	0
NEOS – The New Austria	NEOS	4,705	3,294	108	8,107	4.48%	0
Alliance for the Future of Austria	BZÖ	2,755	2,611	41	5,407	2.99%	0
Communist Party of Austria	KPÖ	1,405	588	20	2,013	1.11%	0
Pirate Party of Austria	PIRAT	920	619	22	1,561	0.86%	0
Christian Party of Austria	CPÖ	202	180	2	384	0.21%	0
Der Wandel	WANDL	178	139	3	320	0.18%	0
Valid Votes		98,462	81,341	1,205	181,008	100.00%	5
Rejected Votes		1,895	1,659	20	3,574	1.94%	
Total Polled		100,357	83,000	1,225	184,582	74.90%	
Registered Electors		140,809	105,643		246,452		
Turnout		71.27%	78.57%		74.90%		

The following candidates were elected:

- Personal mandates - Gabriela Moser (GRÜNE), 5,285 votes.
- Party mandates - Claudia Durchschlag (ÖVP), 1,722 votes; Dietmar Keck (SPÖ), 2,991 votes; Hermann Krist (SPÖ), 2,862 votes; and Philipp Schrangl (FPÖ), 1,886 votes.

==== 2000s ====
===== 2008 =====
Results of the 2008 legislative election held on 28 September 2008:

Party		Votes per district			Total votes	%	Seats
Party		Linz City	Linz Rural	Voting card	Total votes	%	Seats
Social Democratic Party of Austria	SPÖ	40,297	30,480	899	71,676	37.65%	2
Austrian People's Party	ÖVP	17,101	17,042	826	34,969	18.37%	1
Freedom Party of Austria	FPÖ	18,457	16,024	468	34,949	18.36%	1
The Greens – The Green Alternative	GRÜNE	14,361	8,473	754	23,588	12.39%	0
Alliance for the Future of Austria	BZÖ	7,824	7,375	282	15,481	8.13%	0
Liberal Forum	LiF	2,293	1,230	157	3,680	1.93%	0
Independent Citizens' Initiative Save Austria	RETTÖ	834	800	21	1,655	0.87%	0
Fritz Dinkhauser List – Citizens' Forum Tyrol	FRITZ	865	717	43	1,625	0.85%	0
Communist Party of Austria	KPÖ	962	461	28	1,451	0.76%	0
The Christians	DC	580	575	16	1,171	0.62%	0
Left	LINKE	73	34	1	108	0.06%	0
Valid Votes		103,647	83,211	3,495	190,353	100.00%	4
Rejected Votes		1,843	1,793	54	3,690	1.90%	
Total Polled		105,490	85,004	3,549	194,043	79.01%	
Registered Electors		142,125	103,473		245,598		
Turnout		74.22%	82.15%		79.01%		

The following candidates were elected:

- Party mandates - Alois Gradauer (FPÖ), 1,098 votes; Dietmar Keck (SPÖ), 3,263 votes; Hermann Krist (SPÖ), 2,160 votes; and Peter Sonnberger (ÖVP), 3,407 votes.

Substitutions:

- Peter Sonnberger (ÖVP) resigned on 23 February 2010 and was replaced by Claudia Durchschlag (ÖVP) on 24 February 2010.

===== 2006 =====
Results of the 2006 legislative election held on 1 October 2006:

Party		Votes per district			Total votes	%	Seats
Party		Linz City	Linz Rural	Voting card	Total votes	%	Seats
Social Democratic Party of Austria	SPÖ	44,211	33,286	3,540	81,037	44.21%	3
Austrian People's Party	ÖVP	21,451	20,562	3,524	45,537	24.84%	1
The Greens – The Green Alternative	GRÜNE	13,228	7,598	2,387	23,213	12.66%	0
Freedom Party of Austria	FPÖ	11,383	9,552	872	21,807	11.90%	0
Hans-Peter Martin's List	MATIN	2,607	2,351	201	5,159	2.81%	0
Alliance for the Future of Austria	BZÖ	2,483	2,023	237	4,743	2.59%	0
Communist Party of Austria	KPÖ	1,138	547	112	1,797	0.98%	0
Valid Votes		96,501	75,919	10,873	183,293	100.00%	4
Rejected Votes		1,684	1,505	125	3,314	1.78%	
Total Polled		98,185	77,424	10,998	186,607	78.21%	
Registered Electors		139,974	98,618		238,592		
Turnout		70.15%	78.51%		78.21%		

The following candidates were elected:

- Party mandates - Dietmar Keck (SPÖ), 3,114 votes; Hermann Krist (SPÖ), 2,637 votes; Helmut Kukacka (ÖVP), 2,409 votes; and Bettina Stadlbauer (SPÖ), 1,807 votes.

===== 2002 =====
Results of the 2002 legislative election held on 24 November 2002:

Party		Votes per district			Total votes	%	Seats
Party		Linz City	Linz Rural	Voting card	Total votes	%	Seats
Social Democratic Party of Austria	SPÖ	48,849	34,932	2,709	86,490	45.48%	3
Austrian People's Party	ÖVP	30,251	26,952	3,508	60,711	31.92%	2
The Greens – The Green Alternative	GRÜNE	12,163	6,746	2,023	20,932	11.01%	0
Freedom Party of Austria	FPÖ	10,436	7,912	614	18,962	9.97%	0
Liberal Forum	LiF	1,179	816	104	2,099	1.10%	0
Communist Party of Austria	KPÖ	617	325	32	974	0.51%	0
Valid Votes		103,495	77,683	8,990	190,168	100.00%	5
Rejected Votes		1,318	1,247	71	2,636	1.37%	
Total Polled		104,813	78,930	9,061	192,804	83.66%	
Registered Electors		136,449	94,012		230,461		
Turnout		76.81%	83.96%		83.66%		

The following candidates were elected:

- Party mandates - Dietmar Keck (SPÖ), 3,271 votes; Hermann Krist (SPÖ), 3,281 votes; Helmut Kukacka (ÖVP), 3,495 votes; Notburga Schiefermair (ÖVP), 603 votes; and Bettina Stadlbauer (SPÖ), 1,377 votes.

Substitutions:

- Helmut Kukacka (ÖVP) resigned on 4 March 2003 and was replaced by Susanne Wegscheider (ÖVP) on 5 March 2003.
- Susanne Wegscheider (ÖVP) resigned on 6 November 2003 and was replaced by Peter Sonnberger (ÖVP) on 7 November 2003.

==== 1990s ====
===== 1999 =====
Results of the 1999 legislative election held on 3 October 1999:

Party		Votes per district			Total votes	%	Seats
Party		Linz City	Linz Rural	Voting card	Total votes	%	Seats
Social Democratic Party of Austria	SPÖ	39,502	28,793	3,346	71,641	39.96%	2
Freedom Party of Austria	FPÖ	25,653	19,680	2,304	47,637	26.57%	1
Austrian People's Party	ÖVP	16,495	15,413	2,679	34,587	19.29%	1
The Greens – The Green Alternative	GRÜNE	8,462	5,389	1,529	15,380	8.58%	0
Liberal Forum	LiF	4,019	2,270	843	7,132	3.98%	0
The Independents	DU	778	679	97	1,554	0.87%	0
Communist Party of Austria	KPÖ	535	200	55	790	0.44%	0
No to NATO and EU – Neutral Austria Citizens' Initiative	NEIN	327	222	30	579	0.32%	0
Valid Votes		95,771	72,646	10,883	179,300	100.00%	4
Rejected Votes		1,096	980	54	2,130	1.17%	
Total Polled		96,867	73,626	10,937	181,430	79.70%	
Registered Electors		136,202	91,444		227,646		
Turnout		71.12%	80.51%		79.70%		

The following candidates were elected:

- Party mandates - Helmut Dietachmayr (SPÖ), 1,821 votes; Michael Krüger (FPÖ), 2,904 votes; Helmut Kukacka (ÖVP), 2,256 votes; and Barbara Prammer (SPÖ), 6,498 votes.

Substitutions:

- Michael Krüger (FPÖ) resigned on 10 February 2000 and was replaced by Wilhelm Niederhuemer (FPÖ) on 16 February 2000.

===== 1995 =====
Results of the 1995 legislative election held on 17 December 1995:

Party		Votes per district			Total votes	%	Seats
Party		Linz City	Linz Rural	Voting card	Total votes	%	Seats
Social Democratic Party of Austria	SPÖ	53,208	34,377	2,611	90,196	46.82%	3
Freedom Party of Austria	FPÖ	22,098	16,114	1,255	39,467	20.49%	1
Austrian People's Party	ÖVP	19,806	16,830	2,090	38,726	20.10%	1
Liberal Forum	LiF	6,567	3,957	1,016	11,540	5.99%	0
The Greens – The Green Alternative	GRÜNE	5,812	3,585	1,137	10,534	5.47%	0
No – Civic Action Group; Against the Sale of Austria	NEIN	929	663	61	1,653	0.86%	0
Communist Party of Austria	KPÖ	365	126	24	515	0.27%	0
Valid Votes		108,785	75,652	8,194	192,631	100.00%	5
Rejected Votes		1,794	1,359	85	3,238	1.65%	
Total Polled		110,579	77,011	8,279	195,869	85.87%	
Registered Electors		139,063	89,045		228,108		
Turnout		79.52%	86.49%		85.87%		

The following candidates were elected:

- Party mandates - Sonja Ablinger (SPÖ), 747 votes; Helmut Dietachmayr (SPÖ), 2,982 votes; Erhard Koppler (SPÖ), 3,129 votes; Michael Krüger (FPÖ), 1,714 votes; and Helmut Kukacka (ÖVP), 1,732 votes. (Note: SPÖ: 4th placed candidate Ewald Nowotny was elected in Upper Austria.)

===== 1994 =====
Results of the 1994 legislative election held on 9 October 1994:

Party		Votes per district			Total votes	%	Seats
Party		Linz City	Linz Rural	Voting card	Total votes	%	Seats
Social Democratic Party of Austria	SPÖ	42,743	29,387	3,020	75,150	41.74%	3
Freedom Party of Austria	FPÖ	22,690	15,892	1,885	40,467	22.48%	1
Austrian People's Party	ÖVP	16,778	14,263	2,260	33,301	18.50%	1
The Greens – The Green Alternative	GRÜNE	8,951	5,550	1,511	16,012	8.89%	0
Liberal Forum	LiF	6,881	4,126	1,052	12,059	6.70%	0
No – Civic Action Group; Against the Sale of Austria	NEIN	699	448	75	1,222	0.68%	0
Christian Voters Community	CWG	284	258	30	572	0.32%	0
Communist Party of Austria	KPÖ	380	135	20	535	0.30%	0
United Greens Austria – List Adi Pinter	VGÖ	249	139	24	412	0.23%	0
Natural Law Party	ÖNP	170	118	23	311	0.17%	0
Valid Votes		99,825	70,316	9,900	180,041	100.00%	5
Rejected Votes		1,466	1,256	67	2,789	1.53%	
Total Polled		101,291	71,572	9,967	182,830	80.08%	
Registered Electors		139,994	88,317		228,311		
Turnout		72.35%	81.04%		80.08%		

The following candidates were elected:

- Party mandates - Helmut Dietachmayr (SPÖ), 2,404 votes; Ilona Graenitz (SPÖ), 642 votes; Erhard Koppler (SPÖ), 3,188 votes; Michael Krüger (FPÖ), 2,029 votes; and Helmut Kukacka (ÖVP), 2,398 votes.

Substitutions:

- Ilona Graenitz (SPÖ) resigned on 19 September 1995 and was replaced by Sonja Toifl-Campregher (SPÖ) on 20 September 1995.
