= Eugene A. Baumann =

American horticulturist (1817-1869)

- Born: Eugène-Achille Baumann; January 17, 1817; Bollwiller, France
- Died: October 2, 1869 (aged 52); Rahway, New Jersey, U.S.
- Other name: Eugene Achilles Baumann
- Occupations: Horticulturist, landscape architect
- Known for: Landscape Design of Llewellyn Park
- Spouse: Sophie Marguerite Loehr (m. 1843)
- Children: 6

Eugene Achilles Baumann (né Eugène-Achille Baumann; January 12, 1817 – October 2, 1869) was a French-born American horticulturist and landscape architect. He most notably created Llewellyn Park in West Orange, New Jersey, and was noted as one of many unsuccessful contenders for the development of Central Park in Manhattan.

== Early life and education ==
Baumann was born January 12, 1817, in Bollwiller, France, the tenth of twelve children, to Joseph-Bernard Baumann (1775–1837), a horticulturist and nursery owner, and his English-born wife Sarah Hughes (1780–1821). He was the descendant of a well established Alsatian family who operated Pépinières Baumann, one of the leading nurseries of Europe, established in 1740. He completed an apprenticeship as a landscape gardener at the Grand Ducal Gardens in Karlsruhe.

== Career ==
In 1854, Baumann emigrated to the United States from Alsace, France, after his home region was hit by a storm which destroyed much his parental nursery. While the French nursery was rebuilt he also sought independent success in the U.S. partnering with Jacob Weidenmann in 1856. He was involved in designing estate properties in Newport, Rhode Island and most notably Llewellyn Park in West Orange, New Jersey.

From 1858-59 he was the first superintendent of plantings for Central Park in New York City.

In the 1860s, Baumann relocated his family to Morrisania, Bronx where he operated a nursery. In 1866/1867 this nursery was moved to Rahway, New Jersey, where he further expanded the business. The company was later known as J.R. Baumann, Inc. which was managed by his descendants until the early 1970s, being one of the oldest nurseries of the area.

== Personal life ==
On 29 June 1843, Baumann married Sophie Marguerite Loehr (1818–1884), daughter of German-born Philipp Loehr and Anna Loehr (née Schlumberger), of old stock in Illzach. They had six children;

- Ernst Joseph Philippe Baumann (1844–1912), married to Mexican-born Virginia Pauer (1865–1933), they resided in Mexico City and had eight children.
- Camille Eugène Baumann (1847–1929), married Ann Sophia Nelson (1850–1931), originally of Albany, Georgia, had eight children.
- Anna Mathilde Baumann (1848–1851), died in childbed.
- Marie Eugenie Baumann (1849–1850), died in childbed.
- Jean-Jacques Francois Baumann (1853–1854), died in childbed.
- Rose Emmy Baumann (1861–), married Edward Taylor Evans (1865–), had seven children.

All children – but his youngest daughter – were born in Bollwiller, France. The family emigrated to the United States in 1854. Baumann died in October 1869 in Rahway, New Jersey.
