= Bernhard Buhmann =

Austrian painter

Bernhard Buhmann (born 1979 in Bregenz, Austria) is an Austrian painter. He has a master's degree in Sociology (M.Sc Sociology) and Communication Science from the University of Vienna and is currently studying painting at the University of Applied Arts Vienna.

He is represented by Carbon 12 Dubai.

== Selected exhibitions ==
2009

- Spielwiese, Strabag Kunstforum, Vienna

2008

- Sneak Preview, Carbon 12 Gallery, Dubai
- Museum of Contemporary Art, Bukarest | MOYA, Vienna

2007

- Gesellschafter Artaward, Artfair 21, Cologne
- Anna, Arsch und Friedrich, Kunstverein Vorarlberg, Villa Claudia, Feldkirch
- Bernhard Buhmann, IZD Tower, Museum of Young Art, Vienna
- The Essence, Museum angewandter Kunst, Vienna
- Gender Art Lab, Wittgensteinhaus, Vienna
- Sans Serif, Produzentengalerie Praterstraße 15, Vienna
- Bernhard Buhmann und Gernot Petjak, Museum of Young Art, Vienna

2006

- Zeitgenössische Positionen, Galerie am Lidlweg, Neulengbach
- The Essence 06, Museum angewandter Kunst, Vienna

2005

- Junge Kunst, Galerie Mashart, Hohenems
- Malstrom, Universität für angewandte Kunst, Vienna

2004

- Malerei04, Universität für angewandte Kunst, Vienna
- Nestle Kunstförderung, Sammlung Essl, Klosterneuburg
- Siemens Art Lab, Vienna

1998

- Segmente, Hohenems

== Awards ==
2008

- Preisträger des STRABAG Art Award

2007

- Gewinner des Gesellschafter Art Award, Art fair 21, Cologne
- Fohn-Stipendium, Vienna

2004

- Nestle- Kunstförderung
- Austria Card Förderpreis
