= Norbert Nemeth (politician) =

Austrian politician (born 1969)

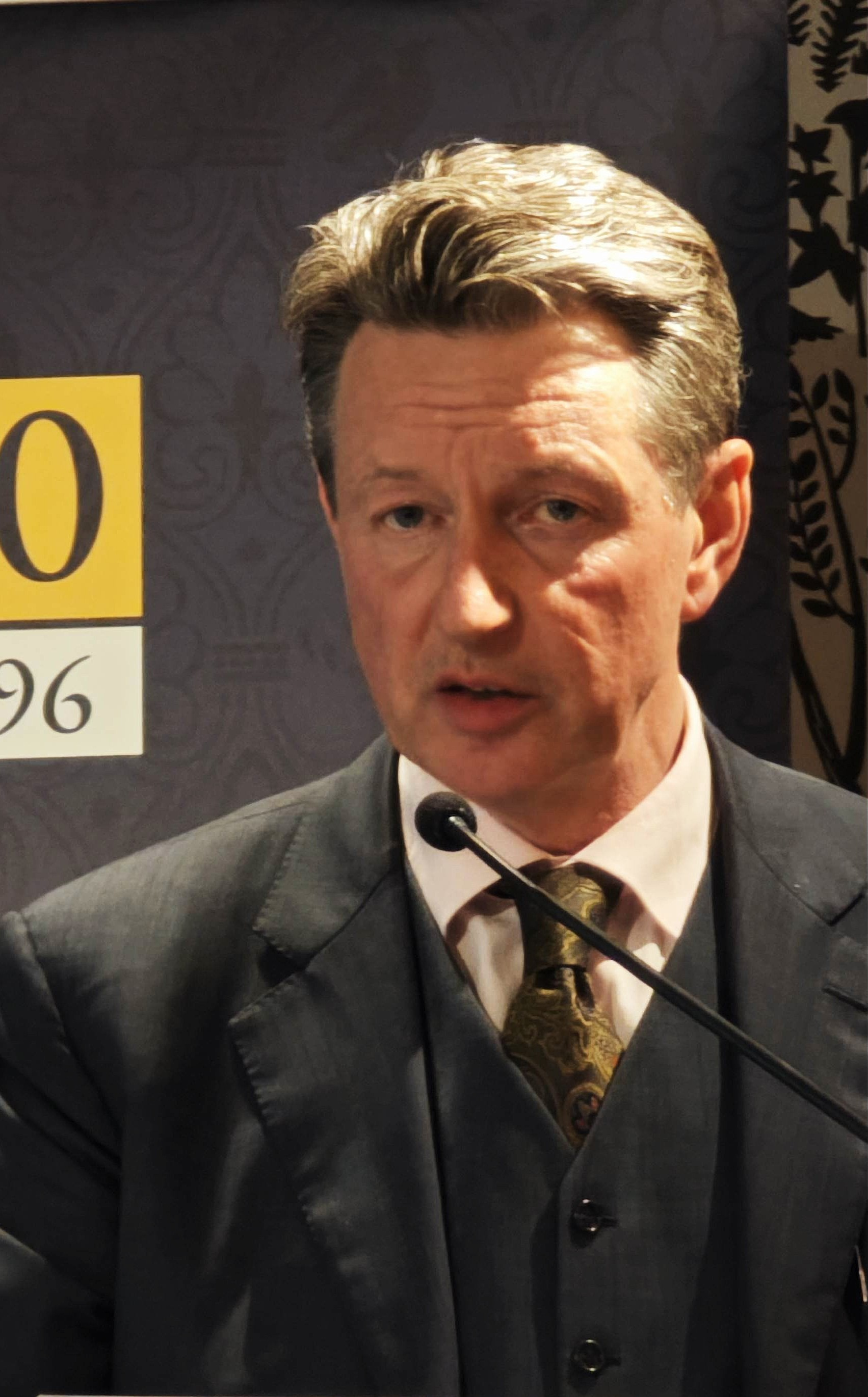
- Nemeth in 2026

Member of the National Council
- In office 24 October 2024 – 4 November 2026
- Constituency: Federal list

Personal details
- Born: 16 January 1969
- Died: 4 November 2026 (aged 57)
- Party: Freedom Party

Norbert Nemeth (16 January 1969 – 4 November 2026) was an Austrian politician of the Freedom Party. He was elected member of the National Council in the 2024 legislative election, and has served as director of the Freedom Party's parliamentary club since 2006.
