= Carsten Baumann (footballer, born 1974) =

German footballer

Personal information
- Date of birth: 28 July 1974 (age 52)
- Place of birth: Germany
- Height: 1.82 m (6 ft 0 in)
- Position: Centre-back

Senior career*
Years	Team	Apps	(Gls)
1994–1996	Bayer Leverkusen II		
1995–1996	Bayer Leverkusen	0	(0)
1996–1997	Bonner SC		
1997–1998	FC Wegberg-Beeck		
1999–2000	Bayer Leverkusen II		
2000–2001	LR Ahlen	6	(0)
2001–2003	SG Wattenscheid 09	47	(0)
2003–2004	Rot-Weiss Essen	13	(0)
- * Club domestic league appearances and goals

Carsten Baumann (born 28 July 1974) is a German former professional footballer who played as a centre-back.
