= IBSF Para Sport European Championships =

Winter sport for athletes with physical impairments

- Sport: Bobsleigh
- First season: 2017
- Organizing body: International Bobsleigh and Skeleton Federation
- Competitors: Athletes with physical impairments
- Countries: Various
- Official website: ibsf.org

Para bobsleigh
- Highest governing body: International Bobsleigh and Skeleton Federation
- First played: Early 2000s

Characteristics
- Equipment: Monobob sled, mechanical launcher
- Venue: Ice tracks

Presence
- Olympic: Not yet included
- Paralympic: Targeting 2026 Winter Paralympics

The IBSF Para Sport European Championships are the official European championship events for para bobsleigh, organized by the International Bobsleigh and Skeleton Federation (IBSF). The championships are open to European athletes with physical impairments and are held annually at rotating venues. They are the first continental championships in the discipline.

The championships serve as the highest level of continental competition for para sliding sports. They play a critical role in the campaign for inclusion in the Paralympic Games, with the IBSF aiming for full recognition by the International Paralympic Committee (IPC) for future editions along with the IBSF Para Sport World Championships and the IBSF Para Sport World Cup events.

== History of the sport ==
Para bobsleigh is an adapted discipline of bobsleigh designed for athletes with physical impairments. It features solo competition in modified monobob sleds, raced down ice tracks at speeds exceeding 130 km/h, with athletes experiencing forces of up to 5G in corners.

The sport emerged in the early 2000s, with athletes such as Aaron Lanningham and Gary Kuhl completing successful runs in Park City, Utah. Kuhl notably competed against able-bodied athletes in America Cup races.

In 2010, the International Bobsleigh and Skeleton Federation (IBSF) formally endorsed para bobsleigh, establishing a Para Sport Committee to oversee its development and advocate for Paralympic inclusion.

The first standardized para monobob sled was developed by Renzo Podar and driven by Swiss Paralympic champion Heinz Frei. The inaugural international competition, the Prince Kropotkin Cup, was held in Sigulda, Latvia in 2013.

=== Equipment and format ===
Para bobsleigh uses a single-person sled known as a monobob, adapted for seated starts and hand steering. Mechanical launchers were introduced to simulate the running start used in able-bodied bobsleigh, ensuring competitive fairness.

Athletes compete individually, and races are timed to the hundredth of a second. The sport emphasizes precision, control, and upper-body strength.

== History of the European Championships ==
The inaugural IBSF Para Sport European Championships were held in January 2017 in Oberhof, Germany, a year after the inaugural World Championships, featuring 19 athletes from 9 nations. The event marked the first formal European continental competition for para bobsleigh athletes. The championships have never to date featured para skeleton.

== Medalists ==
=== Bobsleigh ===
The first IBSF Para Sport European Championships event was held in 2017 and has been held annually ever since, with the 2020 event actually being held in December 2019. Three sliders; Jonas Frei of Switzerland, Corie Mapp of Great Britain and Arturs Klots of Latvia have won the championship twice as of 2025, with Mapp's seven podium finishes the record for a single slider.

Each championship is in the monobob format.

Event	Gold	Silver	Bronze
2017 (Germany) Oberhof; January 2017	Arturs Klots; Latvia	Lauris Zutis; Latvia	Corie Mapp; Great Britain
2018 (Austria) Innsbruck; January 2018	Alvils Brants; Latvia	Corie Mapp; Great Britain	Guro Konstanse Fronsdal; Norway
2019 (Switzerland) St. Moritz; February 2019	Christopher Stewart; Switzerland	Nikolai Johann; Germany	Sebastian Westin; Sweden
2020 (Germany) Oberhof; December 2019*	Corie Mapp; Great Britain	Christopher Stewart; Switzerland	Arturs Klots; Latvia
2021 (France) La Plagne; March 2021	Sebastian Westin; Sweden	Corie Mapp; Great Britain	Christopher Stewart; Switzerland
2022 (Switzerland) St. Moritz; March 2022	Jonas Frei; Switzerland	Corie Mapp; Great Britain	Nikolai Johann; Germany
2023 (Austria) Innsbruck; January 2023	Arturs Klots; Latvia	Corie Mapp; Great Britain	Nikolai Johann; Germany
2024 (Norway) Lillehammer; March 2024	Corie Mapp; Great Britain	Christopher Stewart; Switzerland	Arturs Klots; Latvia
2025 (Latvia) Sigulda; January 2025	Jonas Frei; Switzerland	Hermann Ellmauer; Austria	Arturs Klots; Latvia
2026 (Latvia) Sigulda; January 2026			

== Medal table ==
* Host nation (IBSF)

All-time medal table (2016–2025)
Rank	Nation	Gold	Silver	Bronze	Total
1	Switzerland (SUI)	3	2	1	6
2	Latvia (LAT)	3	1	3	7
3	Great Britain (GBR)	2	4	1	7
4	Sweden (SWE)	1	0	1	2
5	Germany (GER)	0	1	2	3
6	Austria (AUT)	0	1	0	1
7	Norway (NOR)	0	0	1	1
Totals (7 entries)		9	9	9	27

Source: IBSF Results

=== Multiple medalists ===
No.	Athlete	Nation	Years	Gold	Silver	Bronze	Total
1	Corie Mapp	Great Britain	2017-	2	4	1	7
2	Arturs Klots	Latvia	2017-	2	0	3	5
3	Jonas Frei	Switzerland	2022-	2	0	0	2
4	Christopher Stewart	Switzerland	2019-	1	2	1	4
5	Sebastian Westin	Sweden	2019-	1	0	1	2
6	Nikolai Johann	Germany	2019-	0	1	2	3

== See also ==
- IBSF Para Sport World Championships
- IBSF Para Sport World Cup
- IBSF European Championships (bobsleigh and skeleton)
- International Bobsleigh and Skeleton Federation
- Paralympic sports
