= IBSF Para Sport World Cup =

Annual international para bobsleigh and skeleton competition

- Sport: Bobsleigh
- First season: 2014–15
- Organizing body: International Bobsleigh and Skeleton Federation
- Competitors: Athletes with physical impairments
- Countries: Various
- Official website: ibsf.org

The IBSF Para Sport World Cup is an annual international competition series in para bobsleigh, organized by the International Bobsleigh and Skeleton Federation (IBSF). It serves as the top-tier seasonal circuit for athletes with physical impairments competing in sliding sports.

== History ==
The IBSF launched the Para Sport World Cup in the 2014–15 season as part of its commitment to developing inclusive sliding sports. The series followed earlier pilot events such as the Prince Kropotkin Cup and was designed to provide regular international competition for para athletes.

The first full season included races in North America and Europe, with growing participation from countries including Canada, Germany, Latvia, Switzerland, and Great Britain.

== Format ==
The World Cup consists of multiple races held at IBSF-sanctioned tracks between November and March. Athletes accumulate points based on their finishing positions in each race, with overall standings determining the season champions.

The competition uses adapted equipment, including monobob sleds with seated cockpits and mechanical launchers to simulate the start phase.

== Significance ==
The IBSF Para Sport World Cup is the primary qualification pathway for the IBSF Para Sport World Championships and plays a central role in the IBSF’s campaign for Paralympic inclusion.

== Venues ==
Typically World Cup venues include:

- St. Moritz-Celerina Olympic Bobrun, Switzerland
- Sigulda bobsleigh, luge, and skeleton track, Latvia
- Park City, Utah, and Lake Placid, New York, both United States
- Lillehammer Olympic Bobsleigh and Luge Track, Norway
- Iglis Sliding Center, Innsbruck, Austria
- Oberhof bobsleigh, luge, and skeleton track in Germany
- Calgary, Canada
- La Plagne bobsleigh, luge, and skeleton track, France

== Overall results ==
Canada's Lonnie Bissonnette, with four overall World Cup titles, is the most successful slider in the history of the event. Corie Mapp of Great Britain has the most overall podium finishes as of 2025, with nine.

| Season | Year | Gold | Silver | Bronze |
|---|---|---|---|---|
| I | 2014–2015 | Jason Sturm; United States | Corie Mapp; Great Britain | Lonnie Bissonnette; Canada |
| II | 2015–2016 | Lonnie Bissonnette; Canada | Corie Mapp; Great Britain | Aaron Lanningham; United States |
| III | 2016–2017 | Lonnie Bissonnette; Canada | Alvils Brants; Latvia | Brian McPherson; Canada |
| IV | 2017–2018 | Corie Mapp; Great Britain | Christopher Stewart; Switzerland | Lonnie Bissonnette; Canada |
| V | 2018–2019 | Lonnie Bissonnette; Canada | Andreas Kapfinger; Austria | Corie Mapp; Great Britain |
| VI | 2019–2020 | Lonnie Bissonnette; Canada | Corie Mapp; Great Britain | Arturs Klots; Latvia |
| VII | 2020–2021 | Sebastian Westin; Sweden | Christopher Stewart; Switzerland | Lonnie Bissonnette; Canada |
| VIII | 2021–2022 | Jonas Frei; Switzerland | Robert Balk; United States | Corie Mapp; Great Britain |
| IX | 2022–2023 | Guillermo Castillo; United States | Corie Mapp; Great Britain | Jonas Frei; Switzerland |
| X | 2023–2024 | Corie Mapp; Great Britain | Arturs Klots; Latvia | Robert Balk; United States |
| XI | 2024–2025 | Corie Mapp; Great Britain | Jonas Frei; Switzerland | Hermann Ellmauer; Austria |
| XII | 2025–2026 | | | |

== Results by year ==
Great Britain's Corie Mapp has three overall World Cup titles to Bissonnette's four, but has a record 18 individual race victories in World Cup racing, two ahead of Bissonnette.

=== 2014-15 ===
| Leg | Venue | Gold | Silver | Bronze |
|---|---|---|---|---|
| 1 | (Austria) Innsbruck | Corie Mapp (GBR) | Jason Sturm (USA) | Lonnie Bissonnette (CAN) |
| 2 | (Switzerland) St. Moritz | Jason Sturm (USA) | Matiss Zvaigzne (LAT) | Lonnie Bissonnette (CAN) |
| Overall | | Jason Sturm (USA) | Corie Mapp (GBR) | Lonnie Bissonnette (CAN) |

=== 2015-16 ===
| Leg | Venue | Gold | Silver | Bronze |
|---|---|---|---|---|
| 1 | (Canada) Calgary | Lonnie Bissonnette (CAN) | Aaron Lanningham (USA) | Jason Sturm (USA) |
| 2 | (United States) Park City, Utah | Lonnie Bissonnette (CAN) | Gary Kuhl (USA) | Corie Mapp (GBR) |
| 3 | (United States) Park City, Utah II | Lonnie Bissonnette (CAN) | Aaron Lanningham (USA) | Jason Sturm (USA) |
| 4 | (Switzerland) St. Moritz | Corie Mapp (GBR) | Arturs Klots (LAT) | Jason Sturm (USA) |
| 5 | (Austria) Innsbruck | Lonnie Bissonnette (CAN) | Alvils Brants (LAT) | Aaron Lanningham (USA) |
| 6 | (Austria) Innsbruck II | Corie Mapp (GBR) | Alvils Brants (LAT) | Andreas Kapfinger (AUT) |
| Overall | | Lonnie Bissonnette (CAN) | Corie Mapp (GBR) | Aaron Lanningham (USA) |

=== 2016-17 ===
| Leg | Venue | Gold | Silver | Bronze |
|---|---|---|---|---|
| 1 | (United States) Park City, Utah | Brian McPherson (CAN) | Aaron Lanningham (USA) | Alvils Brants (LAT) |
| 2 | (United States) Park City, Utah II | Lonnie Bissonnette (CAN) | Alvils Brants (LAT) | Christopher Stewart (SUI) |
| 3 | (Norway) Lillehammer | Barry Schroeder (USA) | Alvils Brants (LAT) | Lonnie Bissonnette (CAN) |
| 4 | (Norway) Lillehammer II | Alvils Brants (LAT) | Lonnie Bissonnette (CAN) | Barry Schroeder (USA) |
| 5 | (Germany) Oberhof | Arturs Klots (LAT) | Lauris Zutis (LAT) | Corie Mapp (GBR) |
| 6 | (Germany) Oberhof II | Arturs Klots (LAT) | Lauris Zutis (LAT) | Andreas Kapfinger (AUT) |
| Overall | | Lonnie Bissonnette (CAN) | Alvils Brants (LAT) | Brian McPherson (CAN) |

=== 2017-18 ===
| Leg | Venue | Gold | Silver | Bronze |
|---|---|---|---|---|
| 1 | (Canada) Calgary | Jason Sturm (USA) | Lonnie Bissonnette (CAN) | Alvils Brants (LAT) |
| 2 | (Canada) Calgary II | Annija Krumina (LAT) | Alvils Brants (LAT) | Jason Sturm (USA) |
| 3 | (United States) Lke Placid | Christopher Stewart (SUI) | Corie Mapp (GBR) | Lonnie Bissonnette (CAN) |
| 4 | (United States) Lke Placid II | Corie Mapp (GBR) | Lonnie Bissonnette (CAN) | Christopher Stewart (SUI) |
| 5 | (Austria) Innsbruck | Corie Mapp (GBR) | Alvils Brants (LAT) | Christopher Stewart (SUI) |
| 6 | (Austria) Innsbruck II | Alvils Brants (LAT) | Corie Mapp (GBR) | Guro Konstance Fronsdal (NOR) |
| 7 | (Germany) Oberhof | Corie Mapp (GBR) | Alvils Brants (LAT) | Christ Rasmussen (USA) |
| 8 | (Germany) Oberhof II | Corie Mapp (GBR) | Andreas Kapfinger (AUT) | Lonnie Bissonnette (CAN) |
| 9 | (Switzerland) St. Moritz | Christopher Stewart (SUI) | Arturs Klots (LAT) | Corie Mapp (GBR) |
| 10 | (Switzerland) St. Moritz II | Arturs Klots (LAT) | Corie Mapp (GBR) | Christopher Stewart (SUI) |
| Overall | | Corie Mapp (GBR) | Christopher Stewart (SUI) | Lonnie Bissonnette (CAN) |

=== 2018-19 ===
| Leg | Venue | Gold | Silver | Bronze |
|---|---|---|---|---|
| 1 | (United States) Park City, Utah | Lonnie Bissonnette (CAN) | Andreas Kapfinger (AUT) | Christopher Stewart (SUI) |
| 2 | (United States) Park City, Utah II | Lonnie Bissonnette (CAN) | Andreas Kapfinger (AUT) | Barry Schoeder (USA) |
| 3 | (Canada) Calgary | Andreas Kapfinger (AUT) | Lonnie Bissonnette (CAN) | Christ Rasmussen (USA) |
| 4 | (Canada) Calgary II | Guro Konstance Fronsdal (NOR) | Andreas Kapfinger (AUT) | Steven Jacobo (USA) |
| 5 | (Norway) Lillehammer | Lonnie Bissonnette (CAN) | Kenneth Jorgensen (NOR) | Israel Blanco (ESP) |
| 6 | (Norway) Lillehammer II | Lonnie Bissonnette (CAN) | Israel Blanco (ESP) | Kenneth Jorgensen (NOR) |
| 7 | (Germany) Oberhof | Arturs Klots (LAT) | Andreas Kapfinger (AUT) | Corie Mapp (GBR) |
| 8 | (Germany) Oberhof II | Arturs Klots (LAT) | Andreas Kapfinger (AUT) | Corie Mapp (GBR) |
| 9 | (Switzerland) St. Moritz | Sebastian Westin (SWE) | Lonnie Bissonnette (CAN) | Christ Rasmussen (USA) |
| 10 | (Switzerland) St. Moritz II | Christopher Stewart (SUI) | Lonnie Bissonnette (CAN) | Nikolai Johann (GER) |
| Overall | | Lonnie Bissonnette (CAN) | Andreas Kapfinger (AUT) | Corie Mapp (GBR) |

=== 2019–20 ===
| Leg | Venue | Gold | Silver | Bronze |
|---|---|---|---|---|
| 1 | (Norway) Lillehammer | Lonnie Bissonnette (CAN) | Corie Mapp (GBR) | Sebastian Westin (SWE) |
| 2 | (Norway) Lillehammer II | Corie Mapp (GBR) | Lonnie Bissonnette (CAN) | Guro Konstance Fronsdal (NOR) |
| 3 | (Germany) Oberhof | Corie Mapp (GBR) | Arturs Klots (LAT) | Guillermo Castillo (USA) |
| 4 | (Germany) Oberhof II | Corie Mapp (GBR) | Christopher Stewart (SUI) | Arturs Klots (LAT) |
| 5 | (Switzerland) St. Moritz | Arturs Klots (LAT) | Fabrizio Caselli (ITA) | Lonnie Bissonnette (CAN) |
| 6 | (Switzerland) St. Moritz II | Corie Mapp (GBR) | Arturs Klots (LAT) | Fabrizio Caselli (ITA) |
| 7 | (United States) Lke Placid | Dave Nicholls (ISR) | Lonnie Bissonnette (CAN) | Guillermo Castillo (USA) |
| 8 | (United States) Lke Placid II | Lonnie Bissonnette (CAN) | Dave Nicholls (ISR) | Israel Blanco (ESP) |
| 9 | (United States) Park City, Utah | Lonnie Bissonnette (CAN) | Sebastian Westin (SWE) | Dave Nicholls (ISR) |
| 10 | (United States) Park City, Utah II | Sebastian Westin (SWE) | Lonnie Bissonnette (CAN) | Israel Blanco (ESP) |
| Overall | | Lonnie Bissonnette (CAN) | Corie Mapp (GBR) | Arturs Klots (LAT) |

=== 2020-21 ===
| Leg | Venue | Gold | Silver | Bronze |
|---|---|---|---|---|
| 1 | (Switzerland) St. Moritz | Lonnie Bissonnette (CAN) | Christopher Stewart (SUI) | Jonas Frei (SUI) |
| 2 | (Switzerland) St. Moritz II | Christopher Stewart (SUI) | Jonas Frei (SUI) | Lonnie Bissonnette (CAN) |
| 3 | (Switzerland) St. Moritz III | Sebastian Westin (SWE) | JonasFrei (SUI) | Lonnie Bissonnette (CAN) |
| 4 | (France) La Plagne | Sebastian Westin (SWE) | Christopher Stewart (SUI) | Corie Mapp (GBR) |
| 5 | (France) La Plagne II | Lonnie Bissonnette (CAN) | Sebastian Westin (SWE) | Corie Mapp (GBR) |
| Overall | | Sebastian Westin (SWE) | Christopher Stewart (SUI) | Lonnie Bissonnette (CAN) |

=== 2021-22 ===
| Leg | Venue | Gold | Silver | Bronze |
|---|---|---|---|---|
| 1 | (United States) Lke Placid | Robert Balk (USA) | Corie Mapp (GBR) | Christopher Stewart (SUI) |
| 2 | (United States) Lke Placid II | Israel Blanco (ESP) | Steven Jacabo (USA) | Robert Balk (USA) |
| 3 | (United States) Park City, Utah | cancelled | | |
| 4 | (United States) Park City, Utah II | Robert Balk (USA) | Jonas Frei (SUI) | Israel Blanco (ESP) |
| 5 | (Austria) Innsbruck | Jonas Frei (SUI) | Corie Mapp (GBR) | Israel Blanco (ESP) |
| 6 | (Austria) Innsbruck II | Jonas Frei (SUI) | Robert Balk (USA) | Fabrizio Caselli (ITA) |
| 7 | (Austria) Innsbruck III | Jonas Frei (SUI) | Flavio Menardi (ITA) | Fabrizio Caselli (ITA) |
| 8 | (Switzerland) St. Moritz | Jonas Frei (SUI) | Christopher Stewart (SUI) | Hermann Ellmauer (AUT) |
| 9 | (Switzerland) St. Moritz II | Jonas Frei (SUI) | Corie Mapp (GBR) | Nikolai Johann (GER) |
| Overall | | Jonas Frei (SUI) | Robert Balk (USA) | Corie Mapp (GBR) |

=== 2022-23 ===
| Leg | Venue | Gold | Silver | Bronze |
|---|---|---|---|---|
| 1 | (United States) Lke Placid | Guillermo Castillo (USA) | Corie Mapp (GBR) | Israel Blanco (ESP) |
| 2 | (United States) Lke Placid II | Israel Blanco (ESP) | Guillermo Castillo (USA) | Robert Balk (USA) |
| 3 | (Austria) Innsbruck | Guillermo Castillo (USA) | Hermann Ellmauer (AUT) | Robert Balk (USA) |
| 4 | (Austria) Innsbruck II | Arturs Klots (LAT) | Corie Mapp (GBR) | Nikolai Johann (GER) |
| 5 | (Norway) Lillehammer | Hermann Ellmauer (AUT) | Jonas Frei (SUI) | Sebastian Westin (SWE) |
| 6 | (Norway) Lillehammer II | Corie Mapp (GBR) | Jonas Frei (SUI) | Hermann Ellmauer (AUT) |
| Overall | | Guillermo Castillo (USA) | Corie Mapp (GBR) | Jonas Frei (SUI) |

=== 2023-24 ===
| Leg | Venue | Gold | Silver | Bronze |
|---|---|---|---|---|
| 1 | (Norway) Lillehammer | Arturs Klots (LAT) | Corie Mapp (GBR) | Israel Blanco (ESP) |
| 2 | (Norway) Lillehammer II | Guillermo Castillo (USA) | Flavio Menardi (ITA) | Robert Balk (USA) |
| 3 | (Latvia) Sigulda | Arturs Klots (LAT) | Robert Balk (USA) | Hermann Ellmauer (AUT) |
| 4 | (Latvia) Sigulda II | Arturs Klots (LAT) | Corie Mapp (GBR) | Hermann Ellmauer (AUT) |
| 5 | (Switzerland) St. Moritz | Christopher Stewart (SUI) | Robert Balk (USA) | Corie Mapp (GBR) |
| 6 | (Switzerland) St. Moritz II | cancelled | | |
| 7 | (Norway) Lillehammer III | Corie Mapp (GBR) | Christopher Stewart (SUI) | Robert Balk (USA) |
| 8 | (France) La Plagne | Robert Balk (USA) | Corie Mapp (GBR) | Flavio Menardi (ITA) |
| 9 | (France) La Plagne II | Christopher Stewart (SUI) | Arturs Klots (LAT) | Corie Mapp (GBR) |
| Overall | | Corie Mapp (GBR) | Arturs Klots (LAT) | Robert Balk (USA) |

=== 2024-25 ===
| Leg | Venue | Gold | Silver | Bronze |
|---|---|---|---|---|
| 1 | (Norway) Lillehammer | Corie Mapp (GBR) | Hermann Ellmauer (AUT) | Jonas Frei (SUI) |
| 2 | (Norway) Lillehammer II | Flavio Menardi (ITA) | Corie Mapp (GBR) | Jonas Frei (SUI) |
| 3 | (Norway) Lillehammer III | Guillermo Castillo (USA) | Arturs Klots (LAT) | Corie Mapp (GBR) |
| 4 | (Norway) Lillehammer IV | Corie Mapp (GBR) | Robert Balk (USA) | Hermann Ellmauer (AUT) |
| 5 | (Norway) Lillehammer V | Corie Mapp (GBR) | Arturs Klots (LAT) | Hermann Ellmauer (AUT) |
| 6 | (Norway) Lillehammer VI | Arturs Klots (LAT) | Christopher Stewart (SUI) | Corie Mapp (GBR) |
| 7 | (Latvia) Sigulda | Jonas Frei (SUI) | Hermann Ellmauer (AUT) | Arturs Klots (LAT) |
| 8 | (Latvia) Sigulda II | Jonas Frei (SUI) | Hermann Ellmauer (AUT) | Robert Balk (USA) |
| Overall | | Corie Mapp (GBR) | Jonas Frei (SUI) | Hermann Ellmauer (AUT) |

=== 2025-26 ===
| Leg | Venue | Gold | Silver | Bronze |
|---|---|---|---|---|
| 1 | (Norway) Lillehammer | Robert Balk (USA) | Israel Blanco (ESP) | Hermann Ellmauer (AUT) |
| 2 | (Norway) Lillehammer II | Israel Blanco (ESP) | Robert Balk (USA) | Jonas Frei (SUI) |
| 3 | (Latvia) Sigulda | | | |
| 4 | (Latvia) Sigulda II | | | |
| 5 | (Latvia) Sigulda III | | | |
| 6 | (Latvia) Sigulda IV | | | |
| Overall | | | | |

== See also ==
- Para bobsleigh
- IBSF Para Sport World Championships
- IBSF Para Sport European Championships
- IBSF World Cup
- International Bobsleigh and Skeleton Federation
