= Klaus Kotter =

Klaus Kotter (27 May 1934 – 13 May 2010) was a West German-German tax consultant who served as the third president of the Fédération Internationale de Bobsleigh et de Tobogganing (FIBT – International Bobsleigh and Tobogganing Federation), serving as interim from 1978 to 1980, then as president from 1980 to 1994.

Born in Prien am Chiemsee, Kotter became treasurer of the West German Bobsleigh, Luge, and Skeleton Federation (BSD, German since 1990 reunification). By the 1976 Winter Olympics in Innsbruck, he was Olympic attache for the West German Olympic Committee, the same year he was elected vice president of the FIBT. In 1978, he was named interim FIBT president following the ill health of then-president Almicare Rotta on Italy. Kotter was elected president in 1980, serving until 1994.

In 1986, Kotter was named BSD president, a position he held until his 2004 retirement. During his tenure, he kept all four bobsleigh, luge, and skeleton tracks in Germany from being sold in 1999, against the wishes of the German Federal Audit Office.

Kotter received the Olympic Order in 1999. He was also named an honorary past-president of FIBT, a position he held up until his death.
