= List of bobsleigh, luge, and skeleton tracks =

There are a total of 16 bobsleigh, luge, and skeleton tracks around the world in use for competitions. All but one of the current tracks on this list are constructed of reinforced concrete and use artificial refrigeration to keep the track cool enough during early and late season to hold ice. St. Moritz, Switzerland is the exception, as it is carved into the snowpack each year. The IBSF is the governing body for racing with the sports of Bobsled and Skeleton while the FIL is the governing body for racing with Luge.

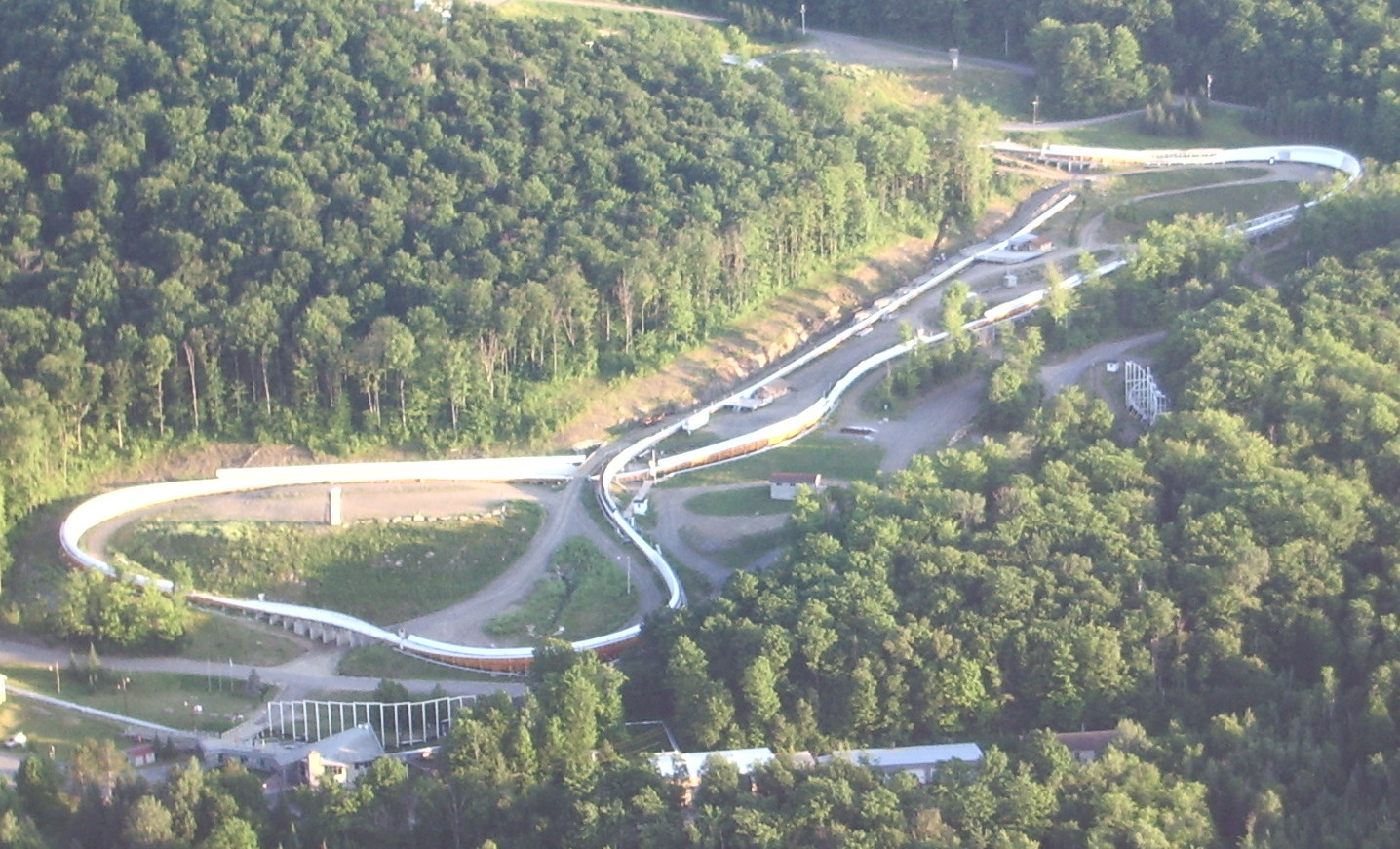
Lake Placid track in the United States during summer

== Artificial tracks ==
=== Internationally used tracks ===
Country	Track	Competition Length (m)	Vertical Drop (m)	Average Grade (%)	Maximum Grade (%)	Bobsleigh / skeleton curves	Luge men's singles curves	Luge women's singles / men's doubles curves	Winter Olympics	Current Track Completed / First Run (year)
Austria	Igls	1,218	124	9.0	18.0	14	14	10	1964, 1976	1963
Canada	Whistler	1,450.4	148	9.0	20.0	16	16	14	2010	2007
China	Yanqing	1,615	121	6.0	18.0	16	16		2022	2020
France	La Plagne	1,507.5	124	8.0	14.0	19	15	14	1992, 2030	1990
Germany	Altenberg	1,413	122.22	8.66	15.0	17	17	15 / 11		1983
Germany	Königssee	1,251.2	120	9.0	10.35	13 / 12	16	12		1968
Germany	Oberhof	1,069.7	96.37	9.2	36.4	15	15	12		1971
Germany	Winterberg	1,330	110	9.8	15.0	14	14	11		1977
Italy	Cortina d'Ampezzo	1,445	107.2	8.4	?	16	?	?	1956,2026	2025
(South Korea) Korea, Rep.	Pyeongchang	1,376	116.32	9.48	25.0	16	16	13	2018	2016
Latvia	Sigulda	1,200	99	8.0	9.3	16	16	13		1986
Norway	Lillehammer	1,365	114.3	8.0	15.0	16	16	13	1994	1992
Russia	Sochi	1,500	124	8.6	22.0	19	20	17	2014	2013
Switzerland	St. Moritz	1,722	130	8.14	15.0	19			1928, 1948	1903
United States	Lake Placid	1,455	128	9.8	20.0	20	20	17	1932, 1980	1930
United States	Park City	1,335	103.9	8.1	15.0	15	17	12	2002, 2034	1997

=== Usually nationally used tracks ===
Country	Track	Length (m)	Vertical Drop (m)	Average Grade (%)	Maximum Grade (%)	Bobsleigh-skeleton curves	Luge men's singles curves	Luge women's singles/ men's doubles curves	Current Track Completed / First Run (year)
Austria	Bludenz	750	43		10,5	6	6	6	2021
Germany	Bautzen								
Germany	Friedrichroda	1450	125	9			5	5	1951
Germany	Ilmenau	750							1980
Italy	Meransen	200					2	2	
Sweden	Hammarstrand	TBD	TBD	TBD	TBD	TBD	TBD	TBD	TBD

=== Former tracks ===
Country	Track	Length (m)	Vertical Drop (m)	Average Grade (%)	Bobsleigh curves	Luge men's singles curves	Luge women's singles / men's doubles curves	Opened	Closed	Winter Olympics
Bosnia and Herzegovina (formerly Yugoslavia)	Trebević	1,300	125.9	10.2	13	13	11	1982	1991	1984
Canada	Calgary	1,475	121.48	8	14	14	10	1986	2019	1988
France	Alpe d'Huez		140		6			1940s ?	1950s ?	none
France	Alpe d'Huez (olympic track)	1,500	140	9.33	13			1967	1968	1968 (Bobsleigh)
France	Chamonix	1,369.88	156.29	11.4	19			1923	1950	1924
France	Villard-de-Lans	1,000	110	11		11		1967	1971	1968 (Luge)
Germany	Garmisch-Partenkirchen	1,525	129.43	8.49	17			1910	1960	1936
Germany	Ilmenau	2.750		12				1926	1962	
Germany	Oybin	800		10,5		11		1971		
Italy	Cesana	1,435	117	9.2	19	19	17	2005	2012	2006
Italy	Cervinia	1,520	142	9.34	15			1963	1991	
Italy	Cortina d'Ampezzo (bobsleigh and skeleton only)	1,350	120.45	15.9	13			1923	2008	1956
Japan	Teineyama	1,536	132	8.4	14			1971	1990	1972 bobsleigh
Japan	Teineyama	1,023	101	9.9		14	11	1971	1972	1972 luge
Japan	Nagano	1,360	113	8.64	14	14	13	1997	2018	1998
Norway	Oslo	1,507.5	124.35	8.6	13			1951	1952	1952
Poland	Szklarska Poręba (Schreiberhau)	2100						1925	1939/40	
Romania	Sinaia	1500	132	13				1970	2009	
Russia	Paramonovo	1600	105	15	19			2010	2016 (not iced since)	
Sweden	Hammarstrand	1,045				11	8	1963	2001	

== Natural luge tracks ==
Please see List of natural luge tracks

These are tracks adapted from existing mountain roads and paths. Artificial banking and refrigeration are prohibited.
