= Vachendorf (Prien am Chiemsee) =

Coordinates: 47°49′43.39″N 12°19′15.44″E

Vachendorf is a village in the municipal district of the market town of Prien am Chiemsee in Landkreis Rosenheim in the state of Bavaria in southern Germany. It has about 55 inhabitants and lies centrally between the larger villages of Prien am Chiemsee, Bernau am Chiemsee, Frasdorf and Aschau im Chiemgau. Because of its proximity to the Chiemsee, Wildenwart Castle and a nature protection area, it is a favourite destination with the area for walkers.

== History ==
The name Vachendorf is of Celtic origin. Numerous tracks in the surrounding area indicate that there was a Roman road that ran alongside the River Prien.

== Transport ==
There is a railway connection here to Aschau im Chiemgau, Prien and Rosenheim on the Chiemgau Railway.
