= Jolls =

Jolls is a surname. Notable people with the surname include:

- Christine Jolls (born 1967), British Gordon Bradford Tweedy Professor of Law
- Tom Jolls (1933–2023), American television personality

== See also ==
- Joll
