= IBSF World Championships 2023 – Para-bobsleigh =

Para-bobsleigh at the IBSF World Championships 2023
- Venue: St. Moritz-Celerina Olympic Bobrun
- Location: St. Moritz, Switzerland
- Dates: 2–3 February
- Competitors: 18 from 12 nations
- Winning time: 4:53.62

Medalists
gold medal	Hermann Ellmauer	Austria
silver medal	Artūrs Klots	Latvia
bronze medal	Christopher Stewart	Switzerland

The Para-bobsleigh competition at the IBSF World Championships 2023 was held on 2 and 3 February 2023.

== Results ==
The first two runs were started on 2 February at 09:00 and the last two runs on 3 February at 09:00.

Rank	Bib	Athlete	Country	Run 1	Rank	Run 2	Rank	Run 3	Rank	Run 4	Rank	Total	Behind
1st place, gold medalist(s)	16	Hermann Ellmauer	Austria	1:13.43	3	1:13.21	1	1:13.28	1	1:13.70	4	4:53.62	
2nd place, silver medalist(s)	5	Artūrs Klots	Latvia	1:13.63	7	1:13.48	5	1:13.34	2	1:13.25	1	4:53.70	+0.08
3rd place, bronze medalist(s)	17	Christopher Stewart	Switzerland	1:13.18	1	1:13.27	2	1:13.48	4	1:13.97	11	4:53.90	+0.28
4	14	Lonnie Bissonnette	Canada	1:13.56	6	1:13.54	6	1:13.83	12	1:13.39	2	4:54.32	+0.70
5	9	Guillermo Castillo	United States	1:13.39	2	1:13.61	9	1:13.82	11	1:13.87	10	4:54.69	+1.07
6	7	Corie Mapp	Great Britain	1:13.43	3	1:13.60	8	1:13.69	7	1:14.05	14	4:54.77	+1.15
7	11	Fabrizio Caselli	Italy	1:14.06	11	1:13.58	7	1:13.74	8	1:13.42	3	4:54.80	+1.18
8	6	Jonas Frei	Switzerland	1:13.75	8	1:13.61	9	1:13.74	8	1:13.80	7	4:54.90	+1.28
9	8	Robert Balk	United States	1:14.05	10	1:13.62	11	1:13.46	3	1:13.83	8	4:54.96	+1.34
10	3	Nikolai Johann	Germany	1:13.44	5	1:14.31	17	1:13.66	5	1:13.98	12	4:55.39	+1.77
11	1	Flavio Menardi	Italy	1:14.24	13	1:13.44	4	1:13.67	6	1:14.08	15	4:55.43	+1.81
12	4	Israel Blanco	Spain	1:13.92	9	1:14.28	15	1:13.79	10	1:13.86	9	4:55.85	+2.23
13	15	Sebastian Westin	Sweden	1:14.90	16	1:13.29	3	1:14.02	13	1:13.71	5	4:55.92	+2.30
14	13	Alvils Brants	Latvia	1:14.13	12	1:13.65	12	1:14.43	16	1:13.78	6	4:55.99	+2.37
15	2	David Jennewein	Italy	1:15.23	18	1:14.13	14	1:14.30	14	1:14.03	13	4:57.69	+4.07
16	18	Austin Parker	United States	1:14.25	14	1:14.29	16	1:14.40	15	1:14.94	18	4:57.88	+4.26
17	12	Michael Stevens	South Africa	1:14.62	15	1:14.09	13	1:14.94	17	1:14.89	17	4:58.54	+4.92
18	10	Gabriela Knapová	Czech Republic	1:15.11	17	1:15.25	18	1:15.44	18	1:14.88	16	5:00.68	+7.06
