= IBSF Para Sport World Championships =

Winter sport for athletes with physical impairments

- Sport: Bobsleigh
- First season: 2016
- Organizing body: International Bobsleigh and Skeleton Federation
- Competitors: Athletes with physical impairments
- Countries: Various
- Official website: ibsf.org

Para bobsleigh
- Highest governing body: International Bobsleigh and Skeleton Federation
- First played: Early 2000s

Characteristics
- Equipment: Monobob sled, mechanical launcher
- Venue: Ice tracks

Presence
- Olympic: Not yet included
- Paralympic: Targeting 2026 Winter Paralympics

The IBSF Para Sport World Championships are the official world-championship events for para-bobsleigh, organized by the International Bobsleigh and Skeleton Federation (IBSF). They are open to athletes with physical impairments and are held annually at varying venues.

They represent the highest level of competition para-sliding sports and play a key role in the campaign for inclusion in the Paralympic Games, with the IBSF aiming for full recognition by the International Paralympic Committee (IPC) for future editions.

== History of the sport ==
Para bobsleigh is an adapted discipline of bobsleigh designed for athletes with physical impairments. It features solo competition in modified monobob sleds, raced down ice tracks at speeds exceeding 130 km/h, with athletes experiencing forces of up to 5G in corners.

The sport emerged in the early 2000s, with athletes such as Aaron Lanningham and Gary Kuhl completing successful runs in Park City, Utah. Kuhl notably competed against able-bodied athletes in America Cup races.

In 2010, the International Bobsleigh and Skeleton Federation (IBSF) formally endorsed para bobsleigh, establishing a Para Sport Committee to oversee its development and advocate for Paralympic inclusion.

The first standardized para monobob sled was developed by Renzo Podar and driven by Swiss Paralympic champion Heinz Frei. The inaugural international competition, the Prince Kropotkin Cup, was held in Sigulda, Latvia in 2013.

=== Equipment and format ===
Para bobsleigh uses a single-person sled known as a monobob, adapted for seated starts and hand steering. Mechanical launchers were introduced to simulate the running start used in able-bodied bobsleigh, ensuring competitive fairness.

Athletes compete individually, and races are timed to the hundredth of a second. The sport emphasizes precision, control, and upper-body strength.

=== Competitions ===
The first IBSF Para Sport World Cup season began in 2014–15, with events held in North America and Europe. World Championships have been hosted in Park City (2016) and St. Moritz (2017), featuring athletes from over a dozen nations including Canada, Germany, Latvia, and Great Britain.

== History of the World Championships ==
The inaugural IBSF World Para Sport Championships were held in Park City, Utah, in March 2016, featuring 19 athletes from 9 nations. The event marked the first formal global competition for para bobsleigh and para skeleton athletes. Subsequent editions, however, included only para bobsleigh events using a modified monobob.

The championships have grown steadily in participation and visibility, with athletes from over a dozen countries competing in recent editions.

== Medalists ==
=== Bobsleigh ===
The first IBSF World Para Sport Championships event was held in 2016 and has been held annually ever since except for 2020 when events were disrupted by the Covid-19 pandemic.

Each championship is in the monobob format.

Event	Gold	Silver	Bronze
2016 (United States) Park City; March 2016	Lonnie Bissonette; Canada	Alvils Brants; Latvia	Arturs Klots; Latvia
2017 (Switzerland) St. Moritz; February 2017	Arturs Klots; Latvia	Lonnie Bissonette; Canada	Corie Mapp; Great Britain
2018 (Norway) Lillehammer; March 2018	Arturs Klots; Latvia	Lonnie Bissonette; Canada	Guro Konstanse Frondal; Norway
2019 (United States) Lake Placid; March 2019	Lonnie Bissonette; Canada	Corie Mapp; Great Britain	Sebastian Westin; Sweden
2020	not held		
2021 (Switzerland) St. Moritz; February 2021	Jonas Frei; Switzerland	Lonnie Bissonette; Canada	Sebastian Westin; Sweden
2022 (Norway) Lillehammer; March 2022	Jonas Frei; Switzerland	Flavio Menardi; Italy	Christopher Stewart; Switzerland
2023 (Switzerland) St. Moritz; March 2023	Hermann Ellmauer; Austria	Arturs Klots; Latvia	Christopher Stewart; Switzerland
2024 (Norway) Lillehammer; March 2024	Robert Balk; United States	Christopher Stewart; Switzerland	Corie Mapp; Great Britain
2025 (Switzerland) St. Moritz; March 2025	Corie Mapp; Great Britain	Jonas Frei; Switzerland	Hermann Ellmauer; Austria
2026 (Switzerland) St. Moritz; January 2026			

=== Skeleton ===
A single para skeleton championship was held in 2016, but has not been contested since.

Event	Gold	Silver	Bronze
2016 (United States) Park City; March 2016	Eric Eierdam; United States	Matthew Richardson; Great Britain	Brendan Dover; Australia

== Medal table ==
* Host nation (IBSF)

All-time medal table (2016–2025)
Rank	Nation	Gold	Silver	Bronze	Total
1	Canada (CAN)	2	3	0	5
2	Switzerland (SUI)	2	2	2	6
3	Latvia (LAT)	2	2	1	5
4	United States (USA)	2	0	0	2
5	Great Britain (GBR)	1	2	2	5
6	Austria (AUT)	1	0	1	2
7	Italy (ITA)	0	1	0	1
8	Sweden (SWE)	0	0	2	2
9	Australia (AUS)	0	0	1	1
9	Norway (NOR)	0	0	1	1
Totals (10 entries)		10	10	10	30

Source: IBSF Results

== See also ==
- IBSF World Championships (bobsleigh and skeleton)
- International Bobsleigh and Skeleton Federation
- Paralympic sports
