= Prien am Chiemsee =

Municipality in Bavaria, Germany

- Municipality
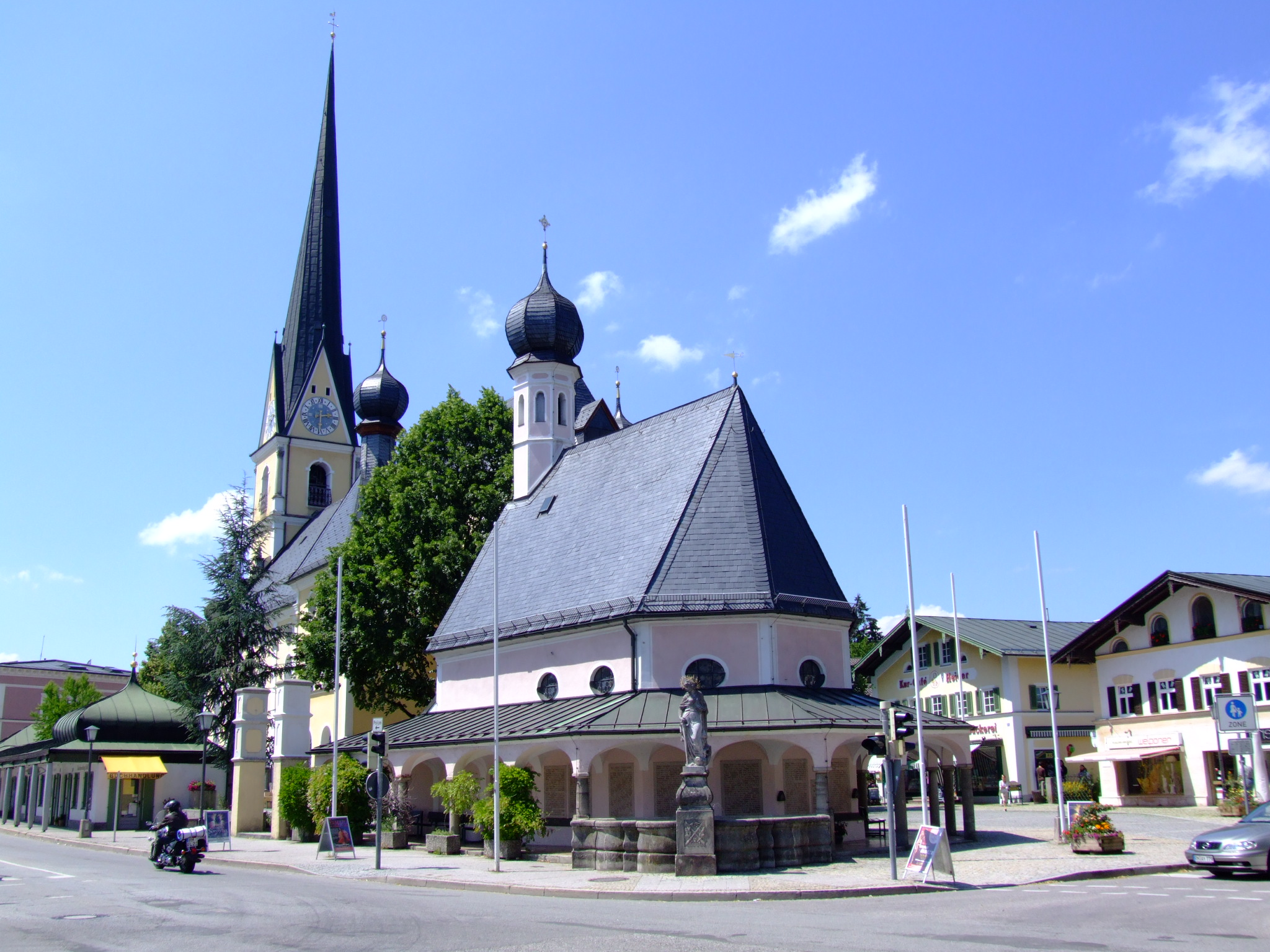
- Parish church at the market square

- Coat of arms

- Location of Prien am Chiemsee within Rosenheim district
- Interactive map of Prien am Chiemsee
- Location within Germany Location within Bavaria
- Coordinates: 47°52′N 12°20′E
- Country: Germany
- State: Bavaria
- Admin. region: Oberbayern
- District: Rosenheim

Government
  - Mayor (2020–26): Andreas Friedrich

Area
  - Total: 20.7 km^{2} (8.0 sq mi)
- Elevation: 520–610 m (1,710–2,000 ft)

Population (2025-12-31)
  - Total: 10,949
  - Density: 529/km^{2} (1,370/sq mi)
- Time zone: UTC+01:00 (CET)
  - Summer (DST): UTC+02:00 (CEST)
- Postal codes: 83209
- Dialling codes: 08051
- Vehicle registration: RO
- Website: www.prien.de

Prien am Chiemsee (German pronunciation: [ˈpʁiːn ʔam ˈkiːmzeː], lit. 'Prien on the Chiemsee'; officially Prien a.Chiemsee) is a municipality in the Upper Bavarian district of Rosenheim in Germany. Located 16 kilometres (9.9 mi) east of Rosenheim, the town is a certified air and Kneipp spa on the western shore of Chiemsee, Bavaria's largest lake.

The name of Prien is derived from the Celtic denomination of the river Prien (Brigenna, 'coming from the mountains').

== Geography ==
=== Neighborhoods ===
The political municipality of Prien am Chiemsee has 36 official neighborhoods:

- Arbing
- Atzing
- Au
- Bachham
- Bauernberg
- Duft
- Egerndorf
- Elperting
- Ernsdorf
- Gaishacken
- Griebling
- Harlach
- Harras
- Hoherting
- Hub
- Irgarting
- Kaltenbach
- Kumpfmühle
- Leiten
- Mailing
- Mitterweg
- Mühlthal
- Munzing
- Mupferting
- Osternach
- Prien am Chiemsee
- Prutdorf
- Schmieding
- Schöllkopf
- Siegharting
- Siggenham
- Stetten
- Trautersdorf
- Urschalling
- Vachendorf
- Westernach

== Transport ==
Prien is on the main rail line between Munich and Salzburg. Two branch lines originate at the Prien station. The Chiemgau Railway is a 10-kilometre (6.2 mi) line extending into the foothills of the Alps at Aschau im Chiemgau; it is served by diesel multiple units. The Chiemsee-Bahn is a 2-kilometre (1.2 mi) narrow-gauge steam-operated seasonal tourist line connecting the Prien station with Lake Chiem at Prien-Stock. From there boats operate to the island of Herreninsel in the lake, on which is a royal palace built by King Ludwig II of Bavaria in the latter nineteenth century.

Bundesautobahn 8, which also connects Munich and Salzburg, can be reached a few kilometers south of the community on state road 2092.

== Famous residents ==
- Adolf von Bomhard (1891–1976) Lieutenant General in German army, mayor
- Klaus Kotter (born 1934) — president of the International Bobsleigh and Tobogganing Federation: 1980–1994.
- Maximilian Nicu (born 1982) — Bundesliga football player

== Twin towns ==
- Valdagno, Italy, since 1987
