= Amilcare Rotta =

Italian bobsledder (1911–1981)

Amilcare Rotta (1 November 1911 – 17 August 1981) was an Italian bobsledder who became the second president of the Fédération Internationale de Bobsleigh et de Tobogganing (FIBT – International Bobsleigh and Tobogganing Federation), serving from 1960 to 1978.

Rotta was Italian champion in the four-man bobsleigh event who also competed in rowing, boxing, and fencing with success. From 1952 to 1960, he served as president of the Italian Bobsleigh Commission, part of the Italian Winter Sports Federation. Following the refusal of the Organizing Committee at Squaw Valley to construct a bobsleigh track for the 1960 Winter Olympics, he chaired the organization of the extraordinary event in Cortina d'Ampezzo that allowed bobsleigh to be held in spite of the 1960 Games.

Rotta succeeded Count Renaud de la Frégeolière of France as FIBT President from 1960 until poor health forced his retirement in 1978. He served as a member of the Tripartite Commission of the International Olympic Committee (IOC) from 1974 to 1976 until illness forced him step down from the IOC.
