= Prien (river) =

River in Bavaria, Germany

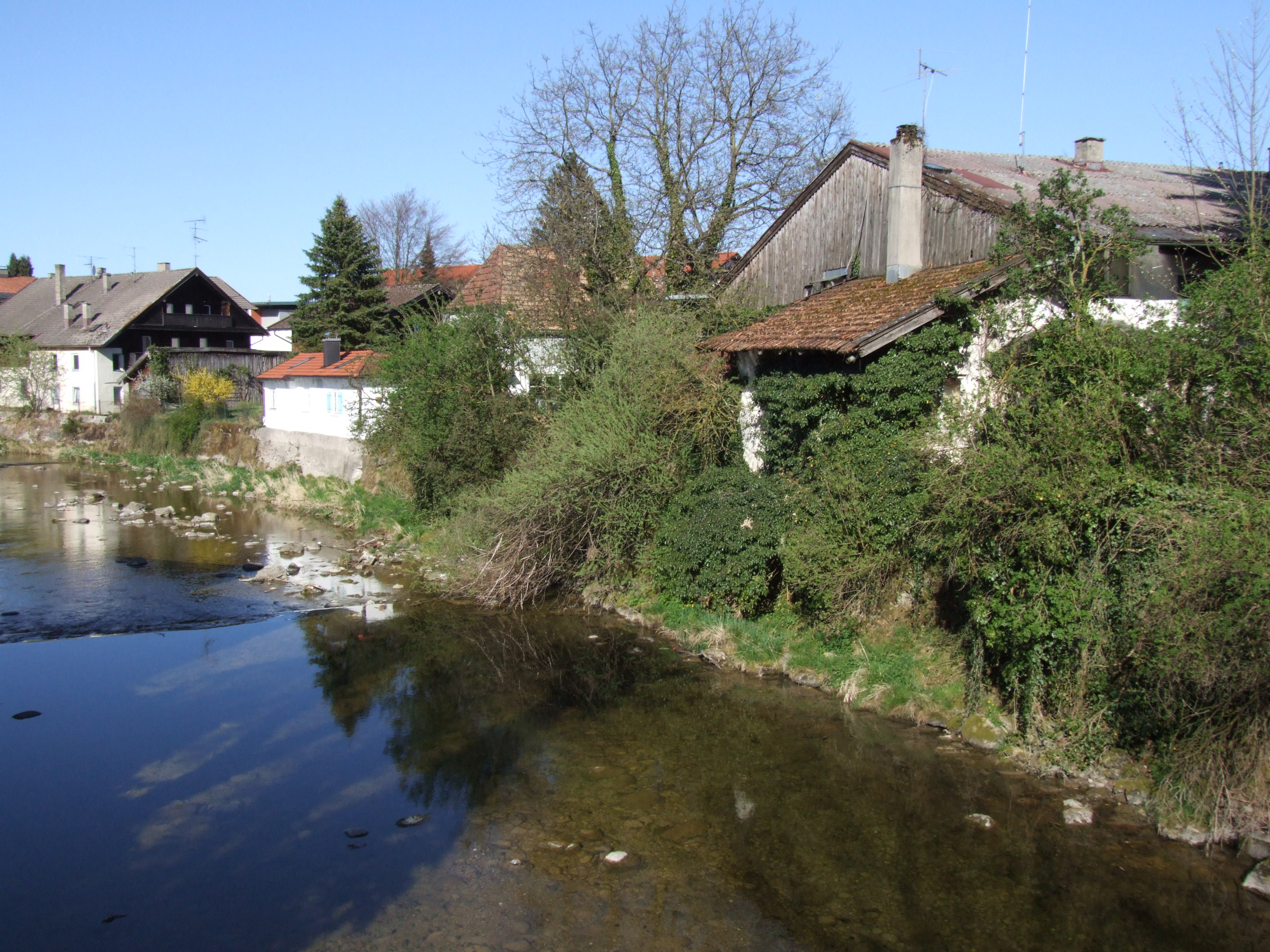
- The Prien in the eponymous town

Location
- Country: Germany
- State: Bavaria

Physical characteristics
- Source
  - location: Spitzstein
  - elevation: 1,150 metres (3,770 ft)
- Mouth
  - location: at Prien am Chiemsee into the Chiemsee
  - coordinates: 47.8756°N 12.3586°E
  - elevation: 518 metres (1,699 ft)
- Length: 33.4 km (20.8 mi)
- Basin size: 246 km^{2} (95 sq mi)

Basin features
- Progression: Alz→ Inn→ Danube→ Black Sea

The Prien is a river of Bavaria, Germany.

Its source is at 1,150 metres (3,770 ft) above sea level at the Spitzstein. After 33 kilometres (21 mi) it discharges into the Chiemsee at the bay Schafwaschener Bucht. It is one of the longest mountain streams in the Bavarian Alps. The name probably derives from the Celtic name of the river, Brigenna, the one coming from the mountains (female) in Celtic languages. The town Prien am Chiemsee was named after the river. Before Prien, on a weir the Mühlbach is fed, which flows independently into the Chiemsee further southward.

The Prien is, after the Tiroler Achen, the second largest tributary to the Chiemsee.

== See also ==
- List of rivers of Bavaria
