= Joll =

Joll is a surname. It may refer to:

- Christopher Joll (1948–2024), British military event director and author
- Ernst Joll (1902–1935), Estonian professional journalist and footballer
- James Joll (1918–1994), British historian and university lecturer
- Philip Joll (born 1954), Welsh operatic baritone
