= Adolf von Bomhard =

German Nazi, SS-Gruppenführer and Generalleutnant of the Ordnungspolizei

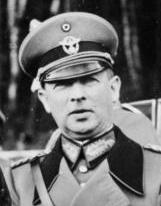
- Bomhard in 1938
- Born: 6 January 1891; Augsburg, German Empire
- Died: 19 June 1976 (aged 85); Prien am Chiemsee, West Germany
- Military career
- Allegiance: German Empire; Weimar Republic; Nazi Germany
- Branch: Schutzstaffel
- Rank: SS-Gruppenführer and Generalleutnant of Police

Adolf von Bomhard (6 January 1891 in Augsburg – 19 July 1976) was an SS-Gruppenführer and Generalleutnant of the Ordnungspolizei (Orpo; order police) in Nazi Germany. In the post-war era he was Bürgermeister of Prien am Chiemsee.

During the First World War, Bomhard saw service as an officer in the Bavarian Army, eventually finishing the war as adjutant to Franz Ritter von Epp. Bomhard would later write and publish the history of his regiment.

Bomhard was sent to Kiev in November 1942 to succeed Otto von Oelhafen as head of police in Reichskommissariat Ukraine. Bomhard followed the same path as his predecessor of integrating police operations with the activities of the SS in the area. Retaining that position until October 1943, Bomhard took an important role in ideological instruction of the Ukrainian police in the Nazi Weltanschauung.

After the Second World War ended, Bomhard served between 1960 and 1966 as mayor of Prien am Chiemsee and received honorary citizenship there in 1971 which was posthumously revoked by the city council in 2013. He was also involved in societies for former members of the police.

== See also ==
- List SS-Gruppenführer
