= Spitzstein =

Mountain in Bavaria, Germany

Coordinates: 47°42′43″N 12°14′53″E

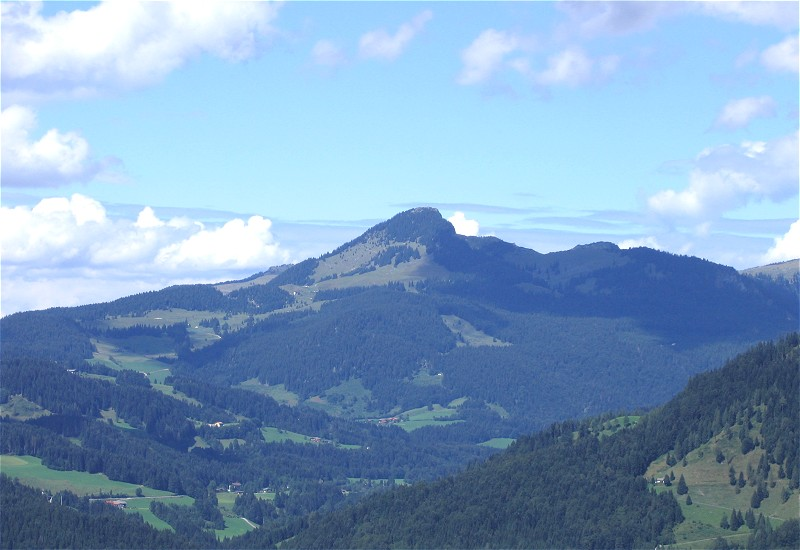

Highest point
- Elevation: 1,596.2 m (5,237 ft)
- Prominence: 851 m (2,792 ft)

Geography
- Location: Bavaria, Germany

Spitzstein is a mountain of Bavaria, Germany.
