= Blue Lake bobsleigh track =

Bobsleigh track in Italy

- Pista di bob del Lago Blu
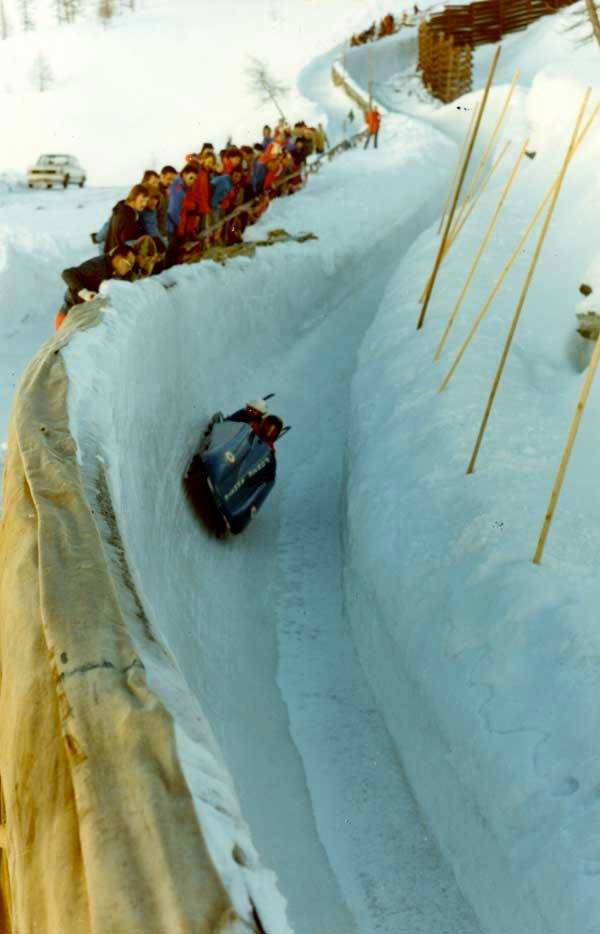
- Interactive map of Blue Lake bobsleigh track
- Address: Valtournenche; Italy
- Location: Breuil-Cervinia
- Operator: Società Cervino
- Type: Bobsleigh track
- Surface: ice

Construction
- Built: 1962-1963
- Opened: 1962
- Closed: 1991
- Years active: 1962-1991
- Cost: 95.400.000 ITL
- Builder: Mario Dal Pont

The Blue Lake bobsleigh track (in Italian: pista di bob del Lago Blu; in French: piste de bobsleigh du Lac Bleu) was a bobsleigh track located near the Blue Lake in Breuil-Cervinia, a hamlet of the municipality of Valtournenche in the Aosta Valley, Italy. Built in 1963, the track hosted numerous international bobsleigh events until its final closure in 1991.

== History ==
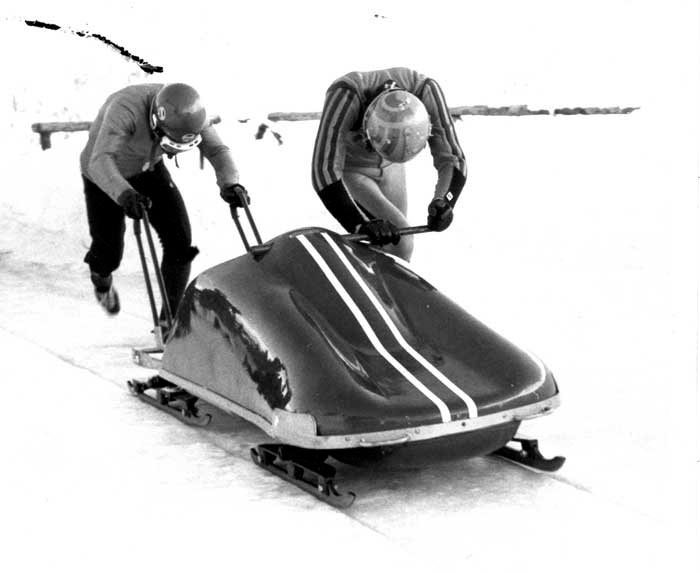
Fausto Soravia and Bernardo Canelli (European junior championship 1974)

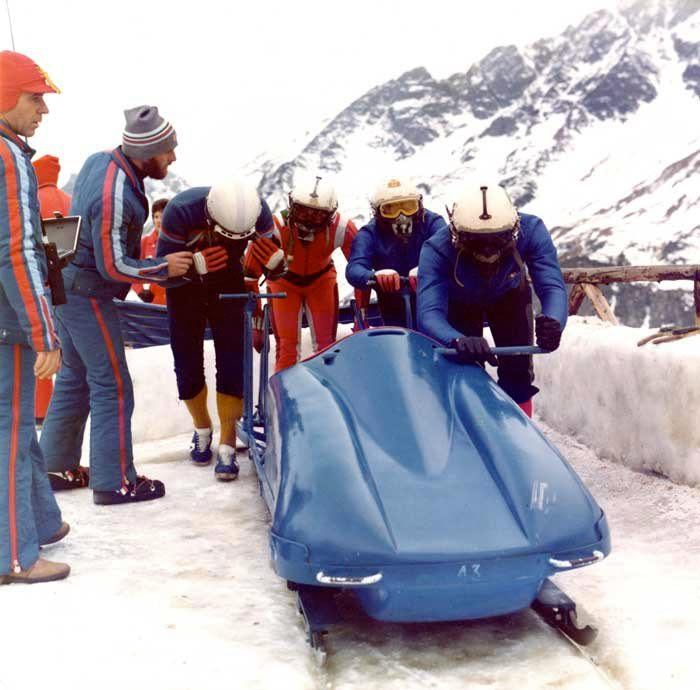
4-men bobsleigh (1976)

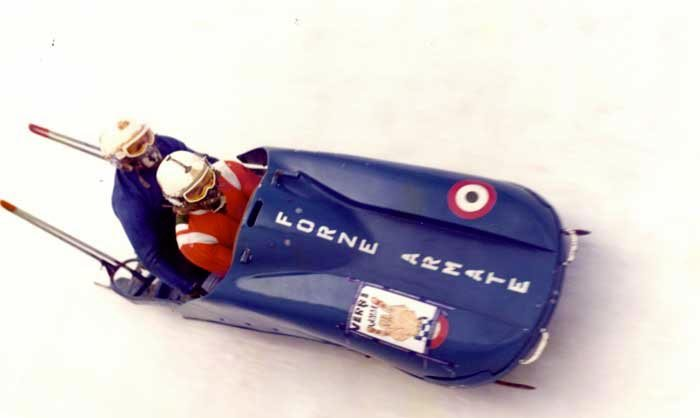
Italian Armed Forces bobsleigh team (1974)

After the successes of the Italy national bobsleigh team on the Olympic track in Cortina d'Ampezzo (the only one existing in Italy at the time), a local committee for the construction of a bobsleigh track at Breuil was formed on 26 September 1959, composed mainly of Milanese fans.

Luigino Gallia, owner of the Grand Hotel Cervinia, and former national team technical commissioner Botta entrusted the design of the track to engineer Luciano Galli, who was inspired by the most famous bobsleigh tracks of the time, including those in Cortina d'Ampezzo and Sankt Moritz.

On 12 April 12 1962, the promoting group was replaced by an executive committee, which was charged with approving the defined project, finding the financial resources (budgeted at 55 million liras) and contracting the construction work for the runway. Due to the opposition of a landowner, the project had to be modified: the construction work, carried out by the construction company Mario Dal Pont of Ponte nelle Alpi (Belluno) in the same year 1962 near the Blue Lake, was thus more difficult than planned, as some rocks had to be unearthed, increasing the final costs of the concrete structure. In total, the construction work amounted to 95.4 million liras, largely financed by contributions from the Aosta Valley Region, CONI and FISI.

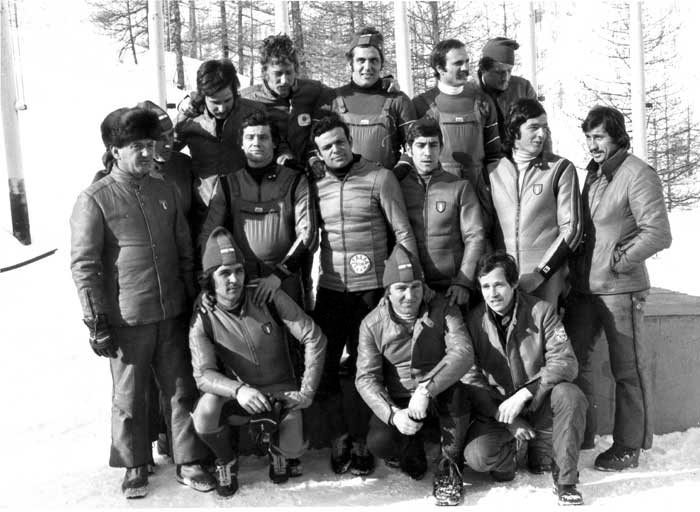
Italy national bobsleigh team in Cervinia in 1974

During the winter of 1962-1963 the bobsled track was given to the Cervino Company, which put it into operation with an operating expense of 11,535,021 liras. To make the natural icing of the slope, about thirty workers led by Luigi De Biaso of Voltago Agordino arrived from Agordino, who for a month accumulated a large quantity of snow, to be mixed with water and prepare the track by the plastering method, also finishing the concrete walls of the curves. At least fifteen track workers were needed for the daily maintenance of the slope, for the duration of the season from December to March. The first test descent was performed by Italian champion Eugenio Monti (known as the "flying red"), who used the bobsled with which he won the 1956 Winter Olympics in Cortina d'Ampezzo: it was an immediate success, recognized by sportsmen and fans.

In the summer of 1963, some construction defects were found, although it was not possible to complete all the investigations, following the Vajont Dam disaster, in which found death the parents of engineer Luciano Galli (who later became the president of the Vajont Survivors Committee). Moreover, on 31 October 1963, during a meeting in St. Vincent, the Dal Pont company pledged to fix the work at its own expense. In the winter of 1963-1964 the slope remained closed, due to the collapse of a curve.

During these years, the Italian Air Force opened a "bobsleigh school" in Cervinia, renamed in 1965 as the "Armed Forces Bobsleigh School," to train pilots, interns and brakemen.

After restoration work, the bobsled track was officially inaugurated in 1966, with a grand ceremony in the presence of the authorities, including Leo Gasperl (founder of the Matterhorn Ski School), Luigi Cravetto (Matterhorn Ropeway Company) and Piero Oneglio (president of the Italian Winter Sports Federation), as well as famous personalities.

The Cervinia track fostered the development of the sport, also highlighting several champions from the Aosta Valley: Maurizio Compagnoni, Gianni Bonichon (silver medalist at the 1972 Winter Olympics in Sapporo) and Franco Perruquet (gold medalist in the two-man bobsleigh at the 1975 World Bobsleigh Championships, organized on this track).

The Cervinia track hosted many international competitions, including 4 world championships, 4 European championships and 17 Italian championships, as well as several stages of the FIBT World Cup.

In 1991 the Blue Lake bobsled track was included in Aosta's bid to organize the 1998 Winter Olympics (later awarded to the Japanese city of Nagano). In the same year, the city of Cervinia again obtained the organization of the 1993 World Bobsleigh Championships, but the excessive costs budgeted for the track's refurbishment decreed the event's renunciation (deliberated on 16 September 1992) and the final closure of the bobsleigh track. In the 2000s, after the 2006 Winter Olympics were awarded to Turin, there was a hypothesis of recovering the old Lac Bleu slope: the Valle d'Aosta Region commissioned a feasibility study to restore, bring up to standard and arrange the slope, which estimated an expense of about two billion liras, as well as an annual management cost of about one billion liras against a possible revenue of 480 million liras. In any case, the organizing committee then decided to build the new Olympic track at Cesana Pariol, which cost 110 million euros and then closed after six years.

== Technical features ==
The length of the icy track was 1.540 kilometres (0.957 mi), with 18 curves (some of which were 6-7 meters high) and an elevation difference of 139 meters, an average slope of 9.34 percent and a maximum slope of 13.19 percent, which allowed the racecars to reach speeds of up to 140 km/h.

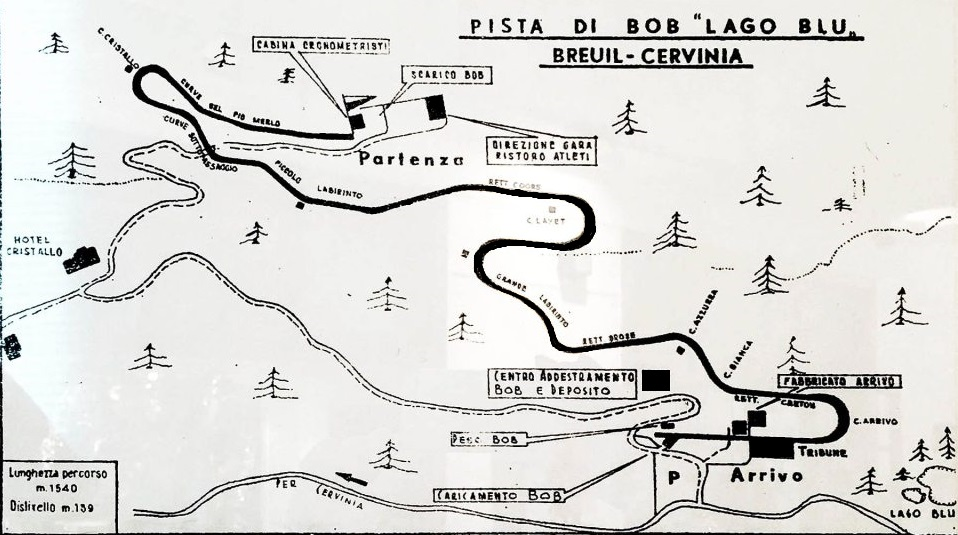
Mappa della pista

Pista del Lago Blu
Curve	Name
	Partenza
1.	Pio Merlo
2.	Cristallo
3. 4. 5.	Sottopassaggio
6. 7. 8.	Piccolo labirinto
	Rettifilo Coors
9.	Layet
10. 11. 12.	Grande labirinto
	Rettifilo Drose
13.	Azzurra
14.	Bianca
	Rettifilo Creton
15.	Arrivo
	Traguardo - Rettilineo d'arresto

== Main events ==
- World Championships: 1971, 1975, 1985
- European Championships: 1969, 1973, 1987, 1991
- World Junior Championships: 1990
- Italian Championships: 1963, 1967, 1968, 1970, 1971, 1972, 1973, 1974, 1975, 1976, 1977, 1979, 1982, 1983, 1987, 1989, 1990
- World Military Championships: 1974, 1975

== Gallery ==
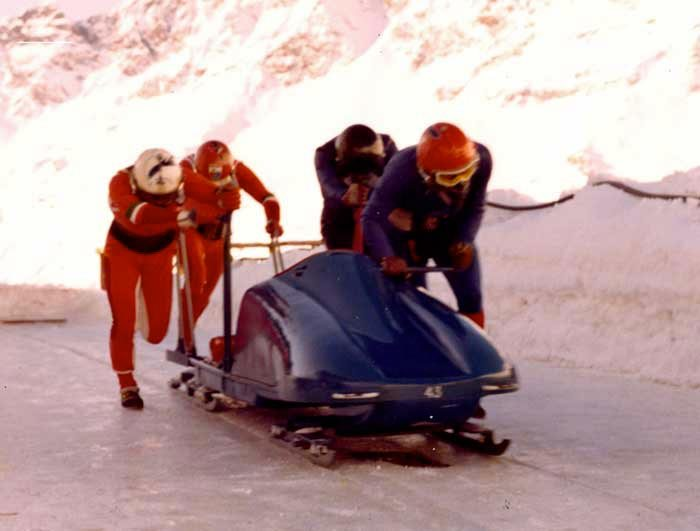

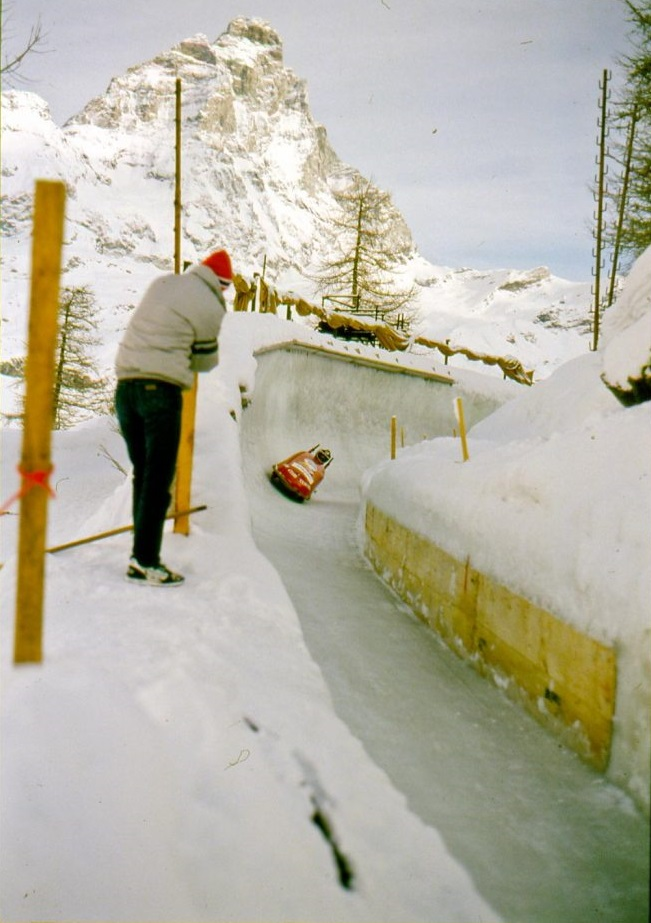

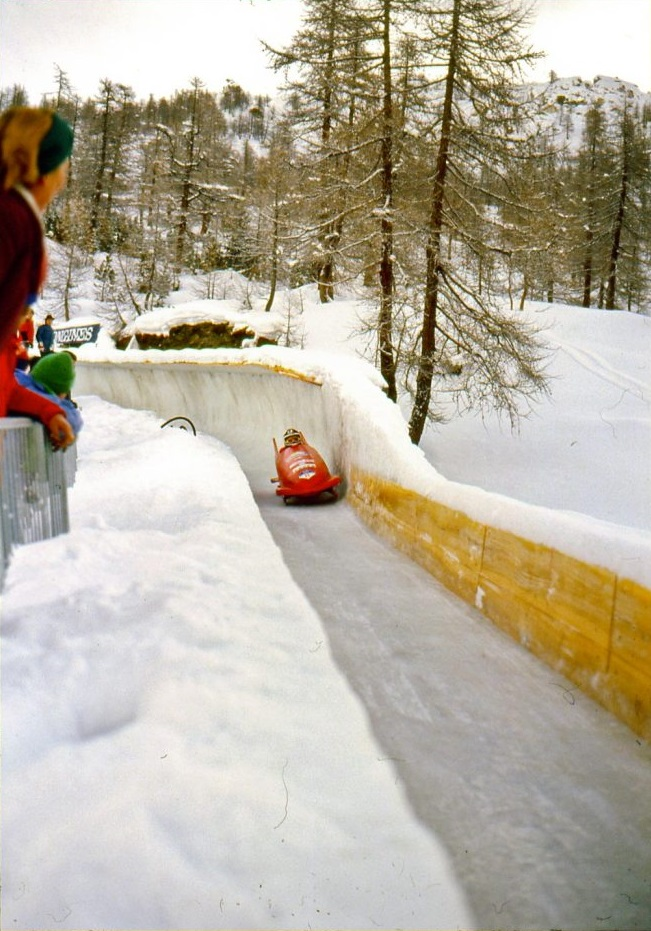

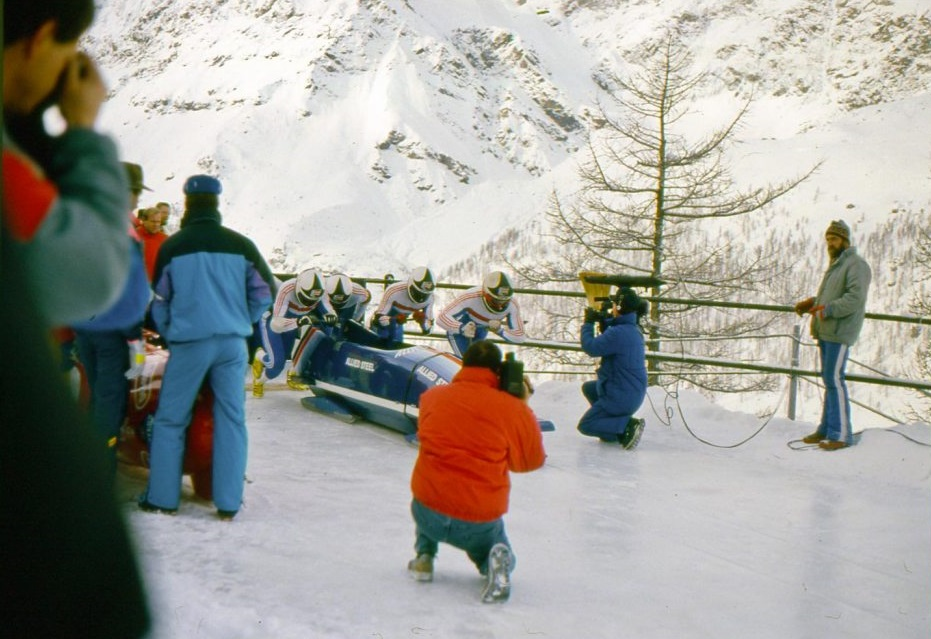

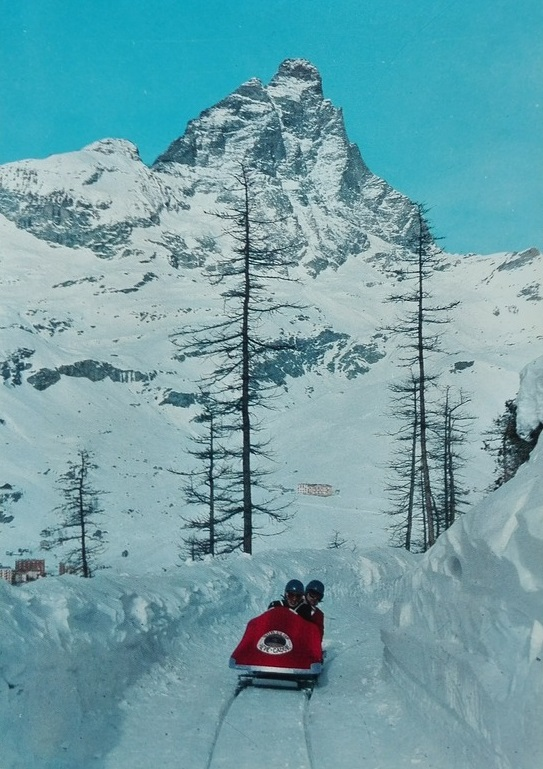

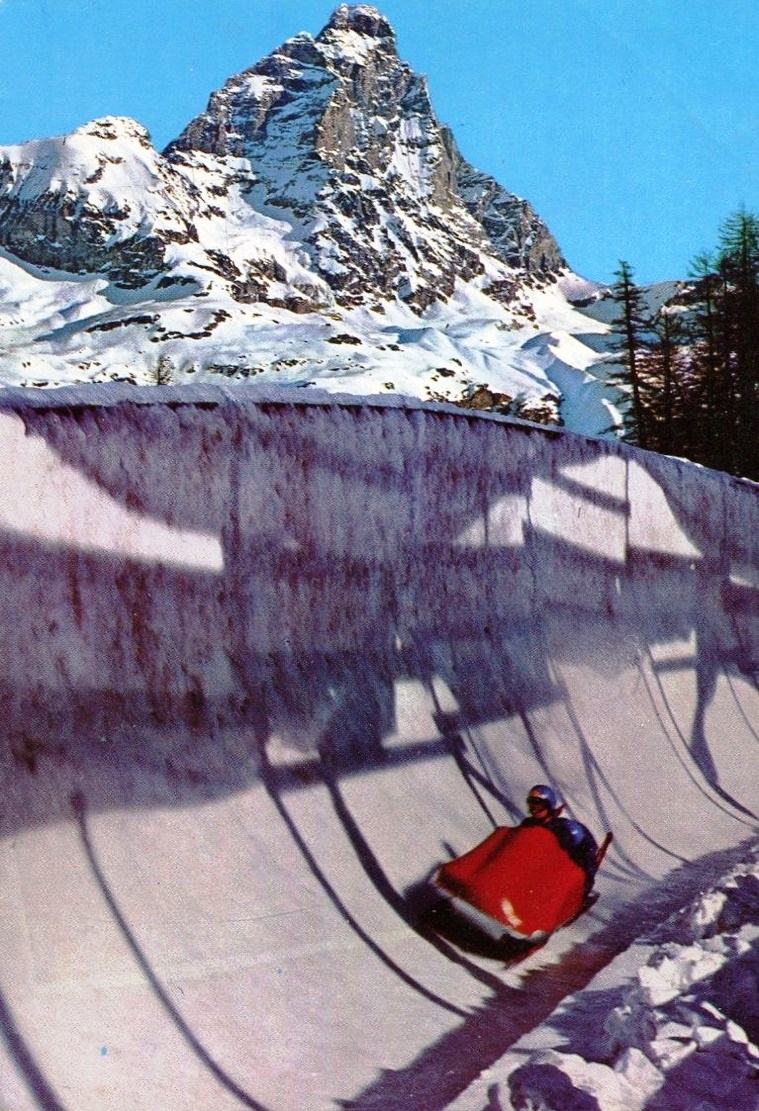
