= Count Renaud de la Frégeolière =

French writer and bobsledder (1886–1981)

Count Renaud de la Frégeolière (29 April 1886 – 16 April 1981) was a French author, bobsledder and veteran air force officer, who became the first president of the Fédération Internationale de Bobsleigh et de Tobogganing (FIBT – International Bobsleigh and Tobogganing Federation), from 1923 to 1960.

== Bobsleigh debut ==
La Frégeolière made his first bobsleigh descent at Leysin, Switzerland in 1907 which led him to an early career in the sport. Six years later, he co-authored a book with Jules Magnus, founder of the International Ice Hockey Federation (IIHF), on the Winter Games.

== First World War ==
Enlisted in the air force in August 1914, he was taken prisoner of war the following 10 October. Until 19 July 1915, he is prisoner of war in the camp of Mersebourg in Germany. Part of an exchange of prisoners, as severely wounded, he is however back in service soon after, with one arm left. He passes his pilot's license, flying on Nieuport and receive several military promotions, up to "adjudant" in July 1917.

== Fondation of the FIBT ==
La Frégeolière developed rules and brought together various bobsleigh clubs in Europe which led to the formation of the FIBT in 1923. He had hoped to compete at the bobsleigh event at the track helped construct for the 1924 Winter Olympics in Chamonix, but a training injury prevented this.

La Frégeolière judged fifty FIBT World Championships, including ten bobsleigh Winter Olympics between 1924 and his 1960 retirement. He also presided over 29 FIBT Congresses.

After his 1960 retirement, La Frégeolière was named FIBT Honorary President which he held until his death in 1981.

He wrote Les sports d'hiver with Louis Magnus in 1911.
