= Christopher Joll =

British military historian (1948–2024)

- Born: Christopher Andrew Joll; 16 October 1948; Marylebone, London, England
- Died: 18 April 2024 (aged 75)
- Education: Oundle School
- Alma mater: Trinity College, Oxford
- Occupations: Military historian, author
- Writing career
- Notable works: Uniquely British: A Year in the life of the Household Cavalry, with a Foreword by HM The Queen
- Website: christopherjoll.com

Christopher Andrew Joll (16 October 1948 – 18 April 2024) was a British military historian, author and military event organiser best known for managing the British Military Tournament.

Joll was educated at Trinity College, Oxford and the Royal Military Academy Sandhurst, and served for seven years as an officer in The Life Guards, including four tours of duty in Northern Ireland.

Joll devised and managed Royal and Military pageants for charities including the Household Cavalry Pageant; the Royal Hospital Chelsea Pageant; and the Gurkha 200 Pageant. He was the Regimental Historian of the Household Cavalry, a Trustee of the Museum Prize Trust, and a guest speaker for Viking Cruises and Noble Caledonia.

His books include a fifteen volume series of historical action-adventure stories, The Speedicut Papers & The Speedicut Memoirs, published by AuthorHouse, a spin-off series from George MacDonald Fraser's Flashman Papers; Uniquely British: A Year in the Life of the Household Cavalry (2012) published by Tricorn Books; The Drum Horse in the Fountain & Other Tales of the Heroes & Rogues in the Guards (2018); and Spoils of War: The Treasures, Trophies & Trivia of the British Empire (2019); Black Ice: The Memoirs of Corie Mapp (2021); The Imperial Impresario: The Treasures, Trophies & Trivia of Napoleon's Theatre of Power (2021) - all published by Nine Elms Books. He was also a regular contributor to Britain at War magazine.

Between 2001 and 2013 he and his partner were responsible for restoring Sham Castle, an 18th-century gothic folly in Shropshire.

Joll died on 18 April 2024, at the age of 75.
