= Corie Mapp =

- Born: Corie Mapp; 13 October 1978 (age 48); Bridgetown, Barbados
- Occupations: Para athlete, Ministry Of Defence←, retired soldier,
- Spouse: Unknown
- Children: Three daughters
- Writing career
- Notable works: Black Ice – The memoir of a soldier, double amputee and world champion
- Notable awards: IBSF World Cup Champion, World Champion, European Champion

Corie Miguel Mapp (born 1978) is an international para-athlete and former Lance Corporal in The Life Guards, the senior regiment of the Household Cavalry and the British Army. He is a Para bobsleigh World Cup winner who in 2020 became Britain's first European Champion in Para Bobsleigh. Born in Bridgetown, Barbados, Mapp came to Britain in 2005 to join the Army where he was the first Barbadian to ride on the Queen's Birthday Parade (Trooping the Colour) and on other mounted State ceremonial duties.

In 2008, he was posted as a combat vehicle driver to the Household Cavalry Regiment in Windsor, which was deployed to Helmand Province, Afghanistan, in late 2009. While on active duty there in early 2010 he lost both legs when his military vehicle ran over an explosive device. Mapp was unconscious for two weeks but within a month of his injury was starting to walk on prosthetic legs.

He later competed in athletics and sitting volleyball for the British Army in the 2013 Warrior Games, and the first three Invictus Games. In 2020 Mapp joined Wiltshire Police as a fulltime Police Community Support Officer, a role he left in 2025 to pursue a new career in the Ministry Of Defence. His autobiography Black Ice, written with former Life Guard and military historian, Christopher Joll was published in October 2021.

Corie Mapp is now a three time IBSF World Cup Champion, a two time European Champion and as of 2025 World Champion.
