= International Bobsleigh and Skeleton Federation =

International sport governing body

- Sport: Bobsleigh and skeleton
- Jurisdiction: International
- Abbreviation: IBSF
- Founded: 23 November 1923; 102 years ago
- Headquarters: Lausanne, Switzerland
- President: Heike Groesswang (2026–present)

Official website
- www.ibsf.org

The International Bobsleigh and Skeleton Federation (IBSF) is the international sports federation for the sliding sports of Bobsleigh and Skeleton. It was founded on 23 November 1923 by the delegates of Great Britain, France, Switzerland, Canada, and the United States at the meeting of their first International Congress in Paris, France as the Fédération Internationale de Bobsleigh et de Tobogganing (International Federation of Bobsleigh and Tobogganing; FIBT). In June 2015, it announced a name change from FIBT to IBSF. The federation's headquarters are in Lausanne, Switzerland.

The IBSF works closely with the IOC to conduct Winter Olympics every four years. Along with the Winter Olympics, the IBSF hosts World Championships the other three years. The races are hosted on tracks in North America, Europe, and Asia. The tracks are shared with the sport of Luge, although that is managed under a different governing body, the International Luge Federation.

== History of Bobsleigh ==
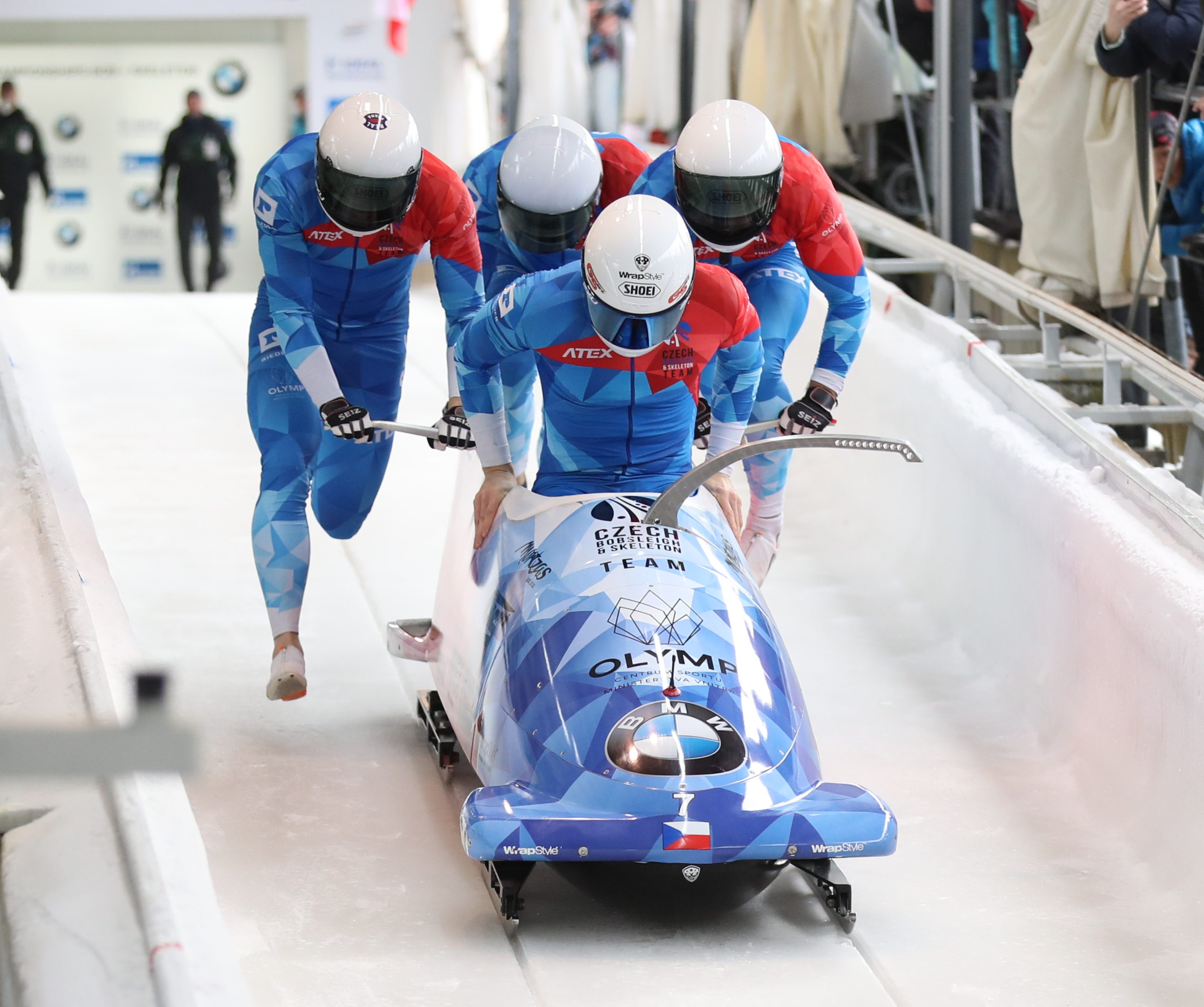
A 4-man bobsled team loading into the sled at the beginning of a race

The world's first bobsleigh club was founded in St. Moritz, Switzerland, in 1897. By 1904, competitions were taking place on natural ice courses (Olympia Bobrun St. Moritz-Celerina). This growth led to the creation of the FIBT in 1923 with inclusion into the International Olympic Committee (IOC) the following year. Before the IBSF, the organization was originally known by the French name Fédération Internationale de Bobsleigh et de Tobogganing (FIBT). At the 1924 Winter Olympics in Chamonix, the four-man event took place. In 1930, the first FIBT World Championships took place with the four-man event in Caux-sur-Montreux, Switzerland with the first two-man event taking place in Oberhof, Germany, the following year. At the 1932 Winter Olympics in Lake Placid, the two-man competition debuted.

In 1935, the Internationaler Schlittensportsverband, a forerunner to the International Luge Federation, was absorbed into the FIBT and a "Section de Luge" was created. The luge section would be abolished when the FIL was split off in 1957.

Because of the growing weight issue at the 1952 Winter Olympics, the first changes occurred when weight limits were introduced. Since then, configurations to the tracks and the bobsleigh itself would be regulated for both competition and safety reasons. Also, bobsleigh was not included in the 1960 Winter Olympics in Squaw Valley, California, for cost reasons in track construction. The development of artificially refrigerated tracks in the late 1960s and early 1970s would greatly enhance speeds. World Cup competitions were first developed in the 1980s while women's competitions took place in the early 1990s. The 2-woman bobsleigh event had their first World Championships in Winterberg, Germany, in 2000 and debuted at the 2002 Winter Olympics in Salt Lake City. In 2016 the IBSF introduced mono-bob as another discipline for youth competitions and as a women's event at the adult level.

== History of Skeleton ==
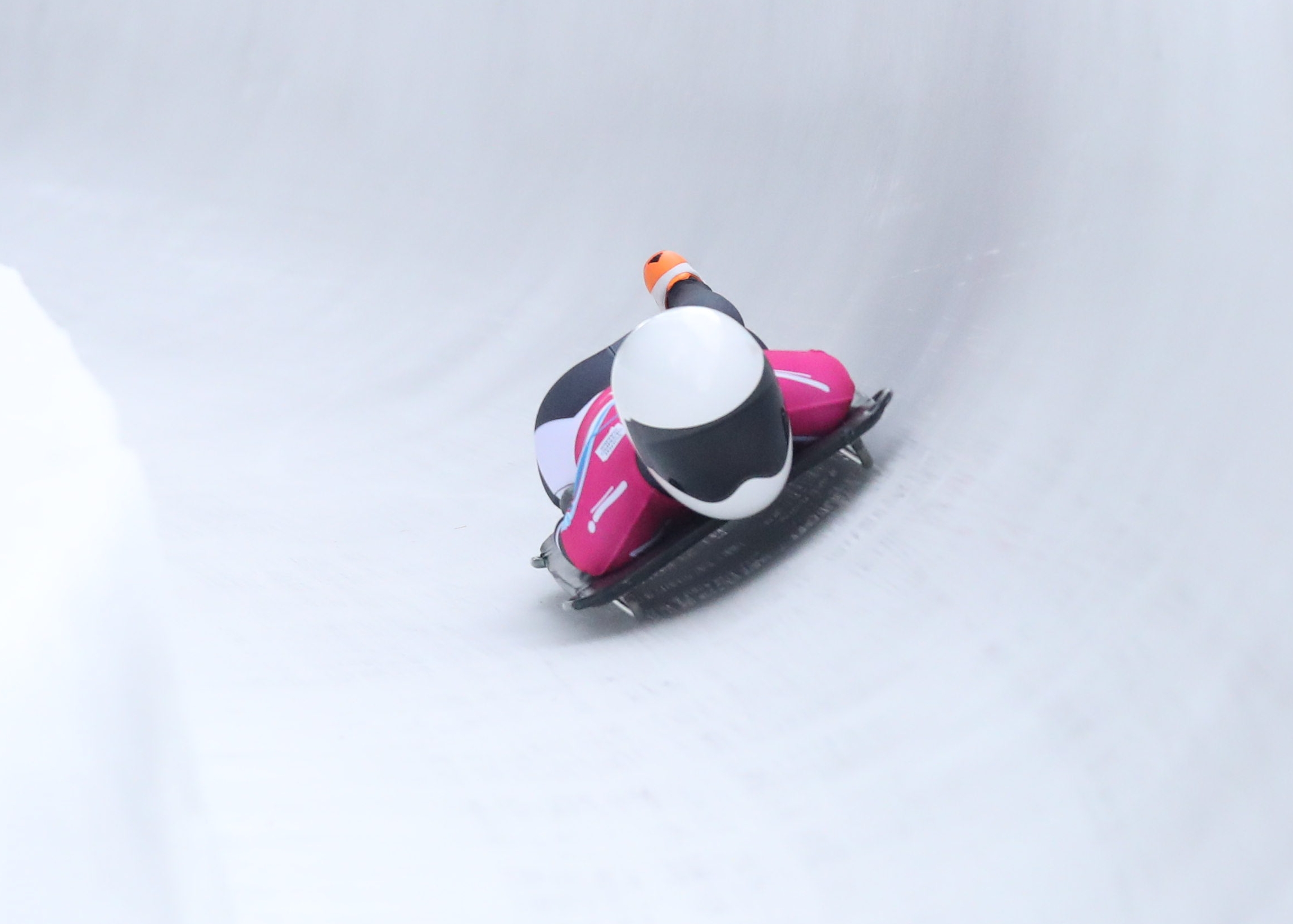
Skeleton athlete sliding down a track

Skeleton was also founded in Switzerland in 1884 as part of the Cresta Run. It remained a Swiss competition until 1906 when the first competitions outside Switzerland took place in Austria. At the 1926 FIBT World Congress in Paris, it was approved that skeleton was an official Winter Olympic sport with competition taking place at the 1928 Winter Olympics in St. Moritz. 13 competitors from five nations took part. Twenty years later, skeleton reappeared on the Olympic program when the 1948 Winter Olympics returned to St. Moritz.

At the 1954 IOC meeting in Athens, Greece, skeleton was replaced by luge on the official Olympic program. This caused skeleton to fall into obscurity until the development of a "bobsleigh skeleton" which could be used on any bobsleigh track in 1970. The development of artificial tracks would also help the rebirth of skeleton as a sport.

The first European Championship was held in 1982 at Königsee, Germany, and the first World Championships were also staged in 1982 at St. Moritz. By 1986, the FIBT started funding skeleton and introduced training schools worldwide to grow the sport. The following year, skeleton European Championships were introduced annually. In 1989, skeleton World Championships were introduced, although the women's championships were not formed until 2000 at Igls, Austria. Skeleton was reintroduced in the Winter Olympic program when the IOC allowed competition for the 2002 Games in Salt Lake City, US.

== IBSF Competitions and Disciplines ==
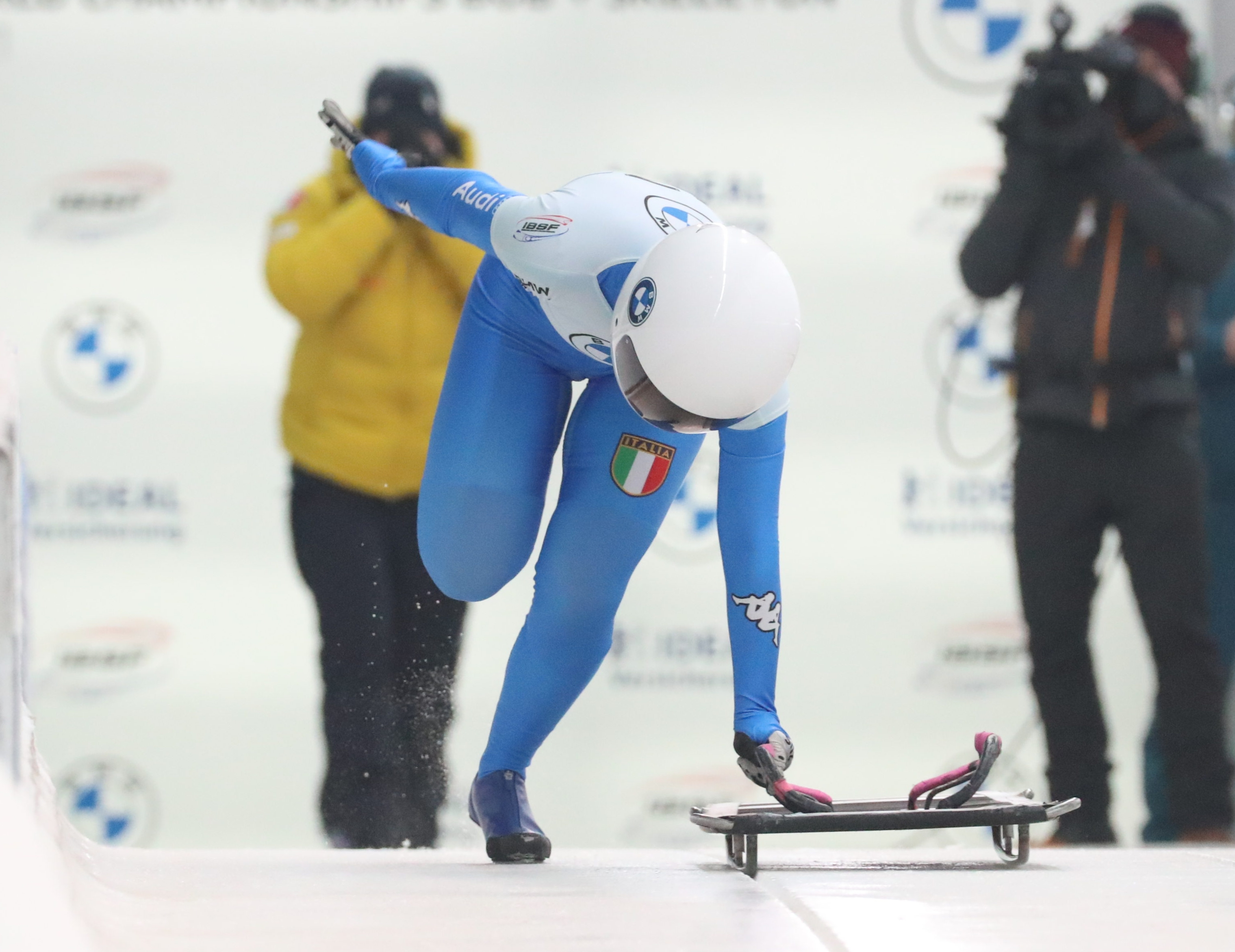
Alessia Crippa 1st run at the 2021 World Championships in Altenberg

The IBSF governs competitions on all bobsleigh and skeleton events at the European Cup, North American Cup, World Cup, and Winter Olympic levels.

Men compete in 2-man and 4-man bobsled, while women compete in 2-man and mono-bob. In each discipline there is an athlete that sits up front and controls the bobsled using the rings and ropes the steer the runners. This athlete is referred to as the Pilot or Driver. In 2-man and 4-man, any athlete other than the driver assists in the acceleration of the bobsled at the start and then does not contribute to the steering once they hop in. The rear-most athlete is referred to as the Brakeman and pulls the brakes in the bobsled once the run is complete and the sled has crossed the finish line. In mono-bob, the Driver and the Brakeman are the same person.

In skeleton there is just one athlete that pushes the sled before riding the sled face down through the same track as bobsleds. Similar to bobsled, there are weight minimums and also weight maximums placed on athletes. This weight is the sum of the athlete and their sled.

== IBSF Tracks ==
Tracks are located in three continents; Europe, North America, and Asia. Annually, there are three different racing circuits athletes can compete on, with two of them (The North American Cup and the European Cup) being development level, while the World Cup is the top level of competition. Below is a current list of IBSF Tracks:

Country	Track	Length (m)	Vertical Drop (m)	Average Grade (%)	Maximum Grade (%)	Number of Curves	Winter Olympics	Year Completed
Austria	Igls	1,228	124	9.0	18.0	14	1964, 1976	1963
Austria	Imst	1,000.9	124.8	12.48				1958
Canada	Whistler	1,450	148	9.0	20.0	16	2010	2007
China	Yanqing	1,975	121	6.0	18.0	16	2022	2020
France	La Plagne	1,507.5	124	8.0	14.0	19	1992	1990
Germany	Altenberg	1,413	122.22	8.66	15.0	17		1983
Germany	Königssee	1,251.2	120	9.0	10.35	13 / 12		1968
Germany	Oberhof	1,069.70	96.37	9.2	36.4	15		1971
Germany	Winterberg	1,330	110	9.8	15.0	14		1977
Japan	Nagano	1,360	113	8.64		14	1998	1997
(South Korea) Korea, Rep.	Pyeongchang	1,376.38	116.32	9.48	25.0	16	2018	2016
Latvia	Sigulda	1,200	99	8.0	9.3	16		1986
Norway	Lillehammer	1,365	114.3	8.0	15.0	16	1994	1992
Russia	Sochi	1,500	124	20.0	22.0	19	2014	2013
Switzerland	St. Moritz	1,722	130	8.14	15.0	19	1928, 1948	1903
United States	Lake Placid	1,455	128	9.8	20.0	20	1932, 1980	1930
United States	Park City	1,335	103.9	8.1	15.0	15	2002	1997

== Presidents ==
The following persons have served as president of IBSF:

- Count Renaud de la Frégeolière (1886–1981) of France; served 1923–1960
- Almicare Rotta (1911–1981) of Italy; served 1960–1980
- Klaus Kotter (1934–2010) from West Germany/Germany; served 1980–1994
- Robert H. Storey (born 1942) from Canada; served 1994–2010
- Ivo Ferriani (born 1960) from Italy; served 2010–2026
- Heike Groesswang (born 1970) from Germany; served since 2026

== Championships ==
- IBSF World Championships
- IBSF Para Sport World Championship
- IBSF European Championships
- IBSF Pan American Championships
- IBSF Junior World Championships
- Bobsleigh World Cup
- North American Cup
- Skeleton World Cup
- European Cup
- Bobsleigh at the Winter Olympics
- Skeleton at the Winter Olympics
