= Bobsleigh at the 2002 Winter Olympics – Four-man =

Four-man bobsleigh at the XIX Olympic Winter Games
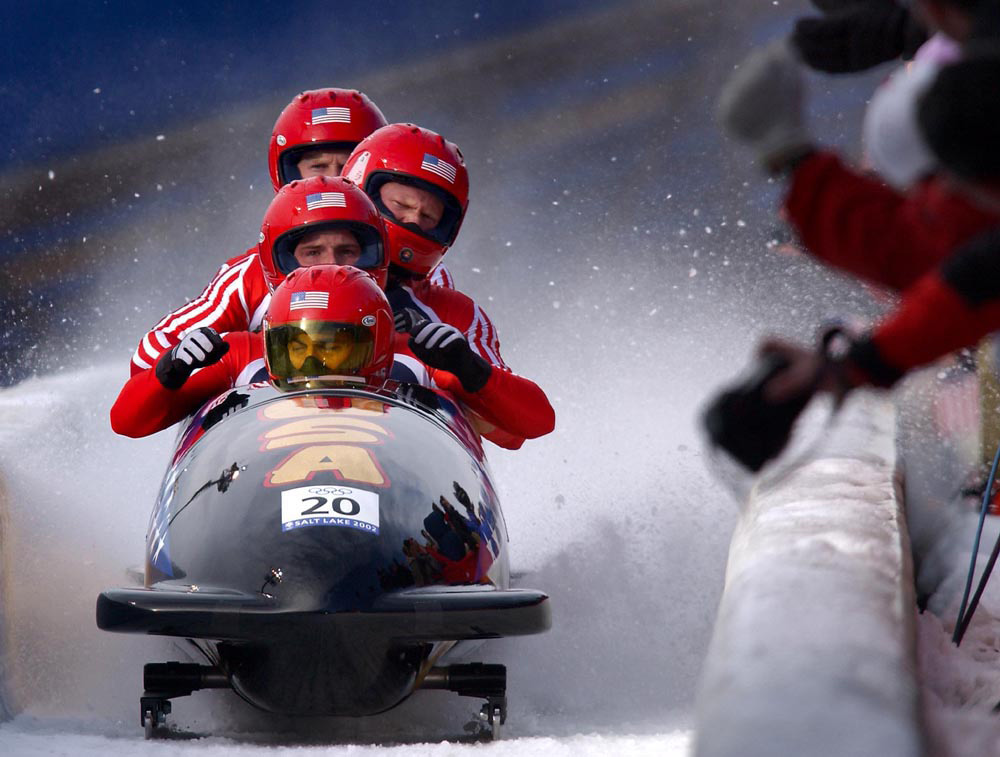
- USA-2 team, consisting of Brian Shimer, Mike Kohn, Doug Sharp and Dan Steele, after finishing the third run of the four-man competition
- Venue: Park City, United States
- Dates: February 22–23, 2002
- Competitors: 135 from 26 nations
- Winning time: 3:07.51

Medalists
1st place, gold medalist(s)		Germany; André Lange, Enrico Kühn, Kevin Kuske, Carsten Embach
2nd place, silver medalist(s)		United States; Todd Hays, Randy Jones, Bill Schuffenhauer, Garrett Hines
3rd place, bronze medalist(s)		United States; Brian Shimer, Mike Kohn, Doug Sharp, Dan Steele

The Four-man bobsleigh competition at the 2002 Winter Olympics in Salt Lake City was held on 22 and 23 February, at the Utah Olympic Park Track near Park City.

== Records ==
While the IOC does not consider bobsled times eligible for Olympic records, the FIBT does maintain records for both the start and a complete run at each track it competes.

Prior to this competition, the existing track records for the Utah Olympic Park Track were as follows.

Type	Date	Team	Time
Start	28 November 1998	Germany; Andre Lange; Christoph Heyder; Enrico Kühn; Lars Behrendt	4.74
Run	25 February 2001	Germany; Andre Lange; Lars Behrendt; Rene Hoppe; Carsten Embach	46.57

The following track records were established during this event.

Type	Date	Run	Team	Time
Start	22 February	1	Switzerland (SUI-1); Martin Annen; Silvio Schäufelberger; Beat Hefti; Cédric Grand	4.73
Start	22 February	2	Switzerland (SUI-1); Martin Annen; Silvio Schäufelberger; Beat Hefti; Cédric Grand	4.72

== Results ==
Rank	Country	Athletes	Run 1	Run 2	Run 3	Run 4	Total
1st place, gold medalist(s)	Germany (GER-2)	André Lange; Enrico Kühn; Kevin Kuske; Carsten Embach	46.71	46.64	46.84	47.32	3:07.51
2nd place, silver medalist(s)	United States (USA-1)	Todd Hays; Randy Jones; Bill Schuffenhauer; Garrett Hines	46.65	46.61	47.22	47.33	3:07.81
3rd place, bronze medalist(s)	United States (USA-2)	Brian Shimer; Mike Kohn; Doug Sharp; Dan Steele	46.83	46.82	46.98	47.23	3:07.86
4	Switzerland (SUI-1)	Martin Annen; Silvio Schäufelberger; Beat Hefti; Cédric Grand	46.72	46.63	47.11	47.49	3:07.95
5	France (FRA-1)	Bruno Mingeon; Éric Le Chanony; Christophe Fouquet; Alexandre Arbez	46.92	46.86	47.25	47.53	3:08.56
6	Switzerland (SUI-2)	Christian Reich; Steve Anderhub; Guido Acklin; Urs Aeberhard	46.71	46.93	47.33	47.62	3:08.59
7	Latvia (LAT-1)	Sandis Prusis; Marcis Rullis; Janis Silarajs; Jānis Ozols	46.99	46.82	47.60	47.65	3:09.06
8	Russia (RUS-1)	Yevgeny Popov; Pyotr Makarchuk; Sergey Golubyov; Dmitry Styopushkin	47.14	46.98	47.45	47.58	3:09.15
9	Canada	Pierre Lueders; Ken LeBlanc; Giulio Zardo; Pascal Caron	47.12	46.97	47.41	47.67	3:09.17
10	France (FRA-2)	Bruno Thomas; Michel André; Thibault Giroud; Philippe Paviot	46.88	47.03	47.47	47.82	3:09.20
11	Great Britain (GBR-1)	Neil Scarisbrick; Scott Rider; Philip Goedluck; Dean Ward	47.09	47.05	47.44	47.79	3:09.37
12	Latvia (LAT-2)	Gatis Guts; Intars Dicmanis; Maris Rozentals; Gunars Bumbulis	46.99	46.99	47.80	47.66	3:09.44
13	Austria	Wolfgang Stampfer; Michael Müller; Klaus Seelos; Martin Schützenauer	47.19	47.27	47.51	47.60	3:09.57
14	Great Britain (GBR-2)	Lee Johnston; Phil Harries; Dave McCalla; Paul Attwood	47.06	47.32	47.41	47.98	3:09.77
15	Czech Republic	Pavel Puškár; Milan Studnicka; Peter Kondrát; Ivo Danilevic; Jan Kobián	47.23	47.17	47.58	47.95	3:09.93
16	Russia (RUS-2)	Aleksandr Zubkov; Aleksey Seliverstov; Filipp Yegorov; Aleksey Andryunin	47.26	47.09	47.76	48.04	3:10.15
17	Netherlands	Arend Glas; Arnold van Calker; Timothy Beck; Marcel Welten	47.15	47.18	47.82	48.23	3:10.38
18	Poland	Tomasz Zyla; Dawid Kupczyk; Krzysztof Sienko; Tomasz Gatka	47.22	47.48	47.93	48.10	3:10.73
19	Italy	Fabrizio Tosini; Andrea Pais de Libera; Massimiliano Rota; Giona Cividino	47.48	47.40	48.11	47.97	3:10.96
20	Japan	Hiroshi Suzuki; Shinji Miura; Shinji Doigawa; Masanori Inoue	47.65	47.46	47.92	48.14	3:11.17
21	Romania	Florian Enache; Adrian Duminicel; Iulian Pacioianu; Teodor Demetriad	47.59	47.66	48.19	48.22	3:11.66
22	Ukraine	Oleh Polyvach; Bohdan Zamostianyk; Oleksandr Ivanyshyn; Yuriy Zhuravskiy	48.03	48.09	48.76	48.89	3:13.77
23	Hungary	Nicholas Frankl; Márton Gyulai; Péter Pallai; Bertalan Pintér; Zsolt Zsombor	48.26	48.18	49.03	49.08	3:14.55
24	Slovakia	Milan Jagnešák; Brano Prieložný; Marián Vanderka; Róbert Krestanko	47.80	47.88	51.10	48.64	3:15.42
25	FR Yugoslavia	Boris Radenovic; Dalibor Ðurdic; Rašo Vucinic; Vuk Radenovic	48.66	48.79	48.97	49.13	3:15.55
26	Croatia	Ivan Šola; Boris Lovrić; Ðulijano Koludra; Niki Drpić (Runs 1–3); Igor Boraska (Run 4)	48.84	48.45	49.17	49.68	3:16.14
27	Brazil	Eric Maleson; Matheus Inocêncio; Edson Bindilatti; Cristiano Rogério Paes	48.91	48.76	49.44	49.62	3:16.73
28	Monaco	Albert, Prince Grimaldi; Charles Oula; Sébastien Gattuso; Patrice Servelle; Jean-François Calmes	47.82	48.02	52.44	48.91	3:17.19
29	Chinese Taipei	Chen Chin-san; Chen Chien-li; Lin Ruei-ming; Chen Chien-sheng	48.86	49.19	50.03	49.68	3:17.76
-	Norway	Arnfinn Kristiansen; Ole Christian Strømberg; Bjarne Røyland; Mariusz Musial	47.02	47.18	47.84	DSQ	-
-	Germany (GER-1)	Christoph Langen; Markus Zimmermann; Franz Sagmeister; Stefan Barucha	46.91	46.77	DNS	-	-
-	New Zealand	Alan Henderson; Steve Harrison; Angus Ross; Mark Edmond	50.67	DNS	-	-	-
-	Virgin Islands	Keith Sudziarski; Paul Zar; Christian Brown; Mike Savitch	51.36	DNS	-	-	-
