= Bobsleigh at the 2002 Winter Olympics =

Bobsleigh at the XIX Olympic Winter Games
- Venue: Utah Olympic Park
- Dates: 16–23 February 2002
- Competitors: 195 from 34 nations

Three bobsleigh events were competed at the 2002 Winter Olympics, at Utah Olympic Park. The competition took place between February 16 and February 23, 2002.

For the first time since 1932, Olympic bobsleigh added a new event, with the first ever women's competition, won by Jill Bakken and Vonetta Flowers of the United States. With the win, Flowers became the first Black athlete of any nationality to win a gold medal in the Winter Olympics.

The competitions comprised four heats. Teams raced in the first and third heats in the order of the draw. The second heat was raced in order of ranking after the first heat, and the fourth heat is raced in order of the ranking after the first three heats. Total time for the four heats determined the final rank.

== Medal summary ==
=== Medal table ===
Rank	Nation	Gold	Silver	Bronze	Total
1	Germany	2	1	1	4
2	United States	1	1	1	3
3	Switzerland	0	1	1	2
Totals (3 entries)		3	3	3	9

=== Events ===
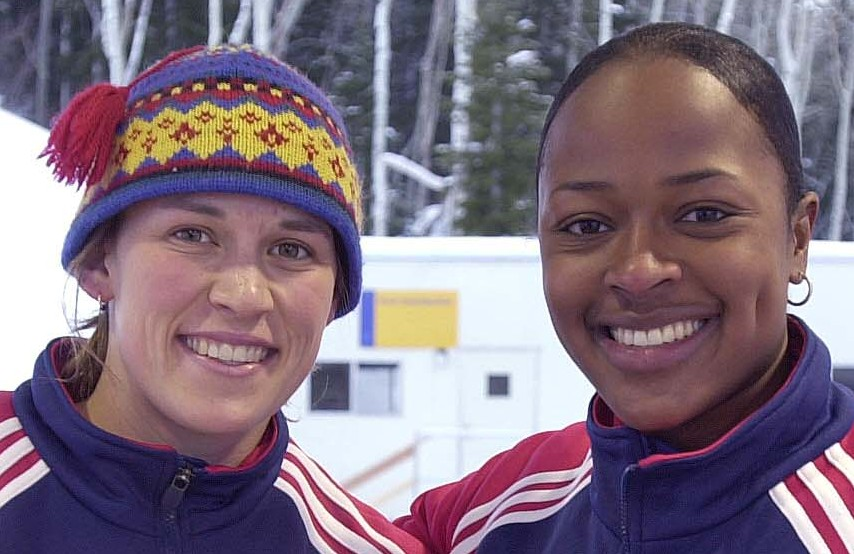
Bakken (left) and Flowers

Event	Gold		Silver		Bronze	
Two-man	Germany (GER-1); Christoph Langen; Markus Zimmermann	3:10.11	Switzerland (SUI-1); Christian Reich; Steve Anderhub	3:10.20	Switzerland (SUI-2); Martin Annen; Beat Hefti	3:10.62
Four-man	Germany (GER-2); André Lange; Enrico Kühn; Kevin Kuske; Carsten Embach	3:07.51	United States (USA-1); Todd Hays; Randy Jones; Bill Schuffenhauer; Garrett Hines	3:07.81	United States (USA-2); Brian Shimer; Mike Kohn; Doug Sharp; Dan Steele	3:07.86
Two-woman	United States (USA-2); Jill Bakken; Vonetta Flowers	1:37.76	Germany (GER-1); Sandra Prokoff; Ulrike Holzner	1:38.06	Germany (GER-2); Susi Erdmann; Nicole Herschmann	1:38.29

== Participating NOCs ==
Thirty-five nations competed in the bobsleigh events at Salt Lake City.

- Armenia (2)
- Australia (4)
- Austria (5)
- Brazil (4)
- Bulgaria (2)
- Canada (8)
- Croatia (4)
- Czech Republic (6)
- France (9)
- Great Britain (14)
- Germany (13)
- Greece (2)
- Hungary (7)
- Ireland (2)
- Virgin Islands (6)
- Italy (9)
- Jamaica (2)
- Japan (5)
- Latvia (8)
- Mexico (2)
- Monaco (4)
- Netherlands (8)
- Norway (4)
- New Zealand (4)
- Poland (4)
- Romania (6)
- Russia (10)
- Slovakia (4)
- Switzerland (10)
- Sweden (2)
- Chinese Taipei (4)
- Trinidad and Tobago (3)
- Ukraine (5)
- United States (12)
- FR Yugoslavia (4)
