= Chinese Taipei at the 2002 Winter Olympics =

- Chinese Taipei Olympic flag
- IOC code: TPE
- NOC: Chinese Taipei Olympic Committee
- Website: www.tpenoc.net (in Chinese and English)

in Salt Lake City, Utah
- Competitors: 6 men in 2 sports
- Flag bearer: Lin Chui-Bin (luge)
- Medals: Gold 0 Silver 0 Bronze 0 Total 0

Winter Olympics appearances (overview)
- 1972; 1976; 1980; 1984; 1988; 1992; 1994; 1998; 2002; 2006; 2010; 2014; 2018; 2022; 2026

The Republic of China was represented at the 2002 Winter Olympics in Salt Lake City, Utah, United States by the Chinese Taipei Olympic Committee.

Due to the political status of Taiwan, the Republic of China competed as Chinese Taipei. The International Olympic Committee mandates that the Chinese Taipei Olympic Committee flag is used, and not the flag of the Republic of China.

In total, six athletes – all men – represented Chinese Taipei in two different sports including bobsleigh and luge.

== Competitors ==
In total, six athletes represented Chinese Taipei at the 2002 Winter Olympics in Salt Lake City, Utah, United States across two different sports.

Sport	Men	Women	Total
Bobsleigh	4	0	4
Luge	2	0	2
Total	6	0	6

== Bobsleigh ==
In total, four athletes representing Chinese Taipei participated in the bobsleigh events – Chen Chin-San, Chen Chien-Li, Lin Ruei-Ming and Chen Chien-Sheng in the four-man bob.

The four-man bobsleigh took place on 22 and 23 February 2002. The first two runs took place on 22 February and the last two runs on 23 February. In their first run, Chinese Taipei completed the course in 48.86 seconds. On their second run, the team recorded a time of 49.19 seconds. Their third run was their slowest of the four at 50.03 seconds and their final run was 49.68 seconds. Their total time of three minutes 17.76 seconds saw them finish in 29th place overall.

Sled	Athletes	Event	Run 1		Run 2		Run 3		Run 4		Total	
Sled	Athletes	Event	Time	Rank	Time	Rank	Time	Rank	Time	Rank	Time	Rank
TPE-1	Chen Chin-San; Chen Chien-Li; Lin Ruei-Ming; Chen Chien-Sheng	Four-man	48.86	30	49.19	31	50.03	28	49.68	28	3:17.76	29

== Luge ==
In total, two athletes representing Chinese Taipei participated in the luge events – Li Chia-Hsun and Lin Chui-Bin in the men's singles.

The men's singles took place on 10 and 11 February 2002. The first two runs took place on 10 February and the last two runs on 11 February.

On his first run, Lin Chui-Bin completed the course in 49.602 seconds. On his second run, he recorded a time of 50.328 seconds. His third run was his slowest of the four at 52.277 seconds and his final run was 51.509 seconds. Lin Chui-Bin's total time of three minutes 23.716 seconds saw him finish in 47th place overall.

On his first run, Li Chia-Hsun completed the course in 55.390 seconds – his slowest of the four runs. He improved by over six seconds on his second run – the fastest of the four – as he recorded a time of 49.092 seconds. His third run was 51.888 seconds and his final run was 49.616 seconds. Li Chia-Hsun's total time of three minutes 25.986 seconds saw him finish in 48th place overall.

Athlete	Run 1		Run 2		Run 3		Run 4		Total	
Athlete	Time	Rank	Time	Rank	Time	Rank	Time	Rank	Time	Rank
Li Chia-Hsun	55.390	48	49.092	46	51.888	46	51.509	45	3:25.986	48
Lin Chui-Bin	49.602	47	50.328	49	52.277	47	51.509	45	3:23.716	47
