= Mariusz Musial =

Norwegian bobsledder and athlete

Personal information
- Born: 1 January 1978 (age 47) Jelenia Góra, Poland

Sport
- Sport: Bobsleigh; Athletics

Mariusz Konrad Musial (born 1 January 1978) is a Norwegian bobsledder and athlete.

He was born in Jelenia Góra, Poland. In his early career he was a track and field athlete, with lifetime bests such as 4.40 metres in the pole vault, 6.90 metres in the long jump and 10.85 seconds in the 100 metres. He represented the club IL i BUL.

He competed at the 2002 Winter Olympics in Salt Lake City, in men's four, together with Arnfinn Kristiansen, Ole Christian Strømberg and Bjarne Røyland.
