= 2002 Winter Olympics Parade of Nations =

During the Parade of Nations portion of the 2002 Winter Olympics opening ceremony, athletes from each country participating in the Olympics paraded in the arena, preceded by their flag. The flag was borne by a sportsperson from that country chosen either by the National Olympic Committee or by the athletes themselves to represent their country. Costa Rica did not march in the parade, but still competed in the Games.

== List ==
Order	Nation	Flag bearer	Sport
1	Greece	Lefteris Fafalis	Cross country
2	Andorra	Victor Gómez	Alpine skiing
3	Argentina	Cristian Javier Simari Birkner	Alpine skiing
4	Armenia	Arsen Harutyunyan	Alpine skiing
5	Australia	Adrian Costa	Freestyle skiing
6	Austria	Angelika Neuner	Luge
7	Azerbaijan	Sergei Rylov	Figure skating
8	Belarus	Oleg Ryzhenkov	Biathlon
9	Belgium	Simon Van Vossel	Short track
10	Bermuda	Patrick Singleton	Luge
11	Bosnia and Herzegovina	Enis Bećirbegović	Alpine skiing
12	Brazil	Mirella Arnhold	Alpine skiing
13	Bulgaria	Stefan Georgiev	Alpine skiing
14	Cameroon	Isaac Menyoli	Cross country
15	Canada	Catriona Le May Doan	Speed skating
16	Chile	Anita Irarrázabal	Alpine skiing
17	People's Republic of China	Zhang Min	Figure skating
18	Croatia	Janica Kostelic	Alpine skiing
19	Cyprus	Theodoros Christodoulou	Alpine skiing
20	Czech Republic	Ales Valenta	Freestyle skiing
21	Denmark	Ulrik Schmidt	Curling
22	Estonia	Allar Levandi	Nordic Combined
23	Fiji	Laurence Thoms	Alpine skiing
24	Finland	Toni Nieminen	Ski jumping
25	Former Yugoslav Republic of Macedonia	Jana Nikolovska	Alpine skiing
26	France	Carole Montillet	Alpine skiing
27	Georgia	Sofia Akhmeteli	Alpine skiing
28	Germany	Hilde Gerg	Alpine skiing
29	Great Britain	Michael Dixon	Biathlon
30	Hong Kong, China	Cordia Tsoi	Short track
31	Hungary	Krisztina Egyed	Speed skating
32	Iceland	Dagny Linda Kristjansdottir	Alpine skiing
33	India	Shiva Keshavan	Luge
34	Islamic Republic of Iran	Bagher Kalhor	Alpine skiing
35	Ireland	Tamsen McGarry	Alpine skiing
36	Israel	Galit Chait	Ice dancing
37	Italy	Isolde Kostner	Alpine skiing
38	Jamaica	Winston Watt	Bobsleigh
39	Japan	Eriko Sanmiya	Speed skating
40	Kazakhstan	Radik Bikchantayev	Speed skating
41	Kenya	Philip Boit	Cross country
42	Korea	Hur Seung-wook	Alpine skiing
43	Kyrgyzstan	Dmitry Chvykov	Ski jumping
44	Latvia	Harijs Vītoliņš	Ice hockey
45	Lebanon	Chirine Njeim	Alpine skiing
46	Liechtenstein	Marco Buchel	Alpine skiing
47	Lithuania	Ricardas Panavas	Cross country
48	Mexico	Roberto Tamés	Bobsleigh
49	Republic of Moldova	Ion Bucsa	Cross country
50	Monaco	Jean-François Calmes	Bobsleigh
51	Mongolia	Jargalyn Erdenetülkhüür	Cross country
52	Nepal	Jay Khadka	Cross country
53	Netherlands	Nicolien Sauerbreij	Snowboard
54	New Zealand	Angela Paul	Luge
55	Norway	Liv Grete Skjelbreid Poiree	Biathlon
56	Poland	Mariusz Siudek	Figure skating
57	Puerto Rico	Manuel Repollet	Bobsleigh
58	Romania	Éva Tófalvi	Biathlon
59	Russian Federation	Alexei Prokourorov	Cross country
60	San Marino	Gian Matteo Giordani	Alpine skiing
61	Slovakia	Róbert Petrovický	Ice hockey
62	Slovenia	Dejan Košir	Snowboard
63	South Africa	Alex Heath	Alpine skiing
64	Spain	Íker Fernández	Snowboard
65	Sweden	Magdalena Forsberg	Biathlon
66	Switzerland	Gian Simmen	Alpine skiing
67	Chinese Taipei	Lin Chui-bin	Luge
68	Tajikistan	Gafar Mirzoyev	Official
69	Thailand	Prawat Nagvajara	Cross country
70	Trinidad and Tobago	Gregory Sun	Bobsleigh
71	Turkey	Atakan Alaftargil	Alpine skiing
72	Ukraine	Olena Petrova	Biathlon
73	Uzbekistan	Komil Urunbayev	Alpine skiing
74	Venezuela	Iginia Boccalandro	Luge
75	Virgin Islands	Dinah Browne	Luge
76	Yugoslavia	Jelena Lolović	Alpine skiing
77	United States of America	Amy Peterson	Short track
