= Federal Republic of Yugoslavia at the 2002 Winter Olympics =

FR Yugoslavia at the 2002 Winter Olympics
- Flag of FR Yugoslavia
- IOC code: YUG
- NOC: Yugoslav Olympic Committee

in Salt Lake City
- Competitors: 6 (5 men, 1 woman) in 2 sports
- Flag bearer: Jelena Lolović (alpine skiing)
- Medals: Gold 0 Silver 0 Bronze 0 Total 0

Winter Olympics appearances (overview)
- 1998; 2002; 2006

Other related appearances
- Croatia (1992–); Slovenia (1992–); Bosnia and Herzegovina (1994–); North Macedonia (1998–); Serbia and Montenegro (1998–2006); Montenegro (2010–); Serbia (2010–); Kosovo (2018–)

Athletes from the Federal Republic of Yugoslavia competed at the 2002 Winter Olympics in Salt Lake City, United States.

== Alpine skiing ==
Men

Athlete	Event	Race 1	Race 2	Total	
Athlete	Event	Time	Time	Time	Rank
Marko Đorđević	Giant Slalom	1:17.25	1:16.40	2:33.56	41
Marko Đorđević	Slalom	55.95	1:00.04	1:55.99	26

Women

Athlete	Event	Race 1	Race 2	Total	
Athlete	Event	Time	Time	Time	Rank
Jelena Lolović	Giant Slalom	1:20.54	1:21.50	2:42.04	40
Jelena Lolović	Slalom	58.87	DNF	DNF	–

== Bobsleigh ==
Men

Sled	Athletes	Event	Run 1		Run 2		Run 3		Run 4		Total	
Sled	Athletes	Event	Time	Rank	Time	Rank	Time	Rank	Time	Rank	Time	Rank
YUG-1	Boris Rađenović; Dalibor Ðurđić; Rašo Vucinić; Vuk Rađenović	Four-man	48.66	28	48.79	30	48.97	24	49.13	26	3:15.55	25
