= Vuk Rađenović =

Germany-resident Serbian bobsledder (born 1983)

Vuk Radjenovic (Serbian Cyrillic: Вук Рађеновић, born 7 June 1983 in Ključ, Bosnia and Herzegovina) is a Germany-resident Serbian bobsledder who has competed since 2001. His best World Cup finish was 11th in a four-men event at Igls in 2013, considered a remarkable performance due to financial struggles of his national federation. Vuk and the Serbian Bobsleigh Team became known as people that "create a lot with nothing". His best two-man World Cup result is 18th in Igls in 2012. Rađenović finished 2012/13 World Cup season in 26th place of Men's Four-Man with 352 . He was selected to compete at the 2010 Winter Olympics in the four-man event where he finished 18th. His best world cup results are 2010: 2man in Lake Placid, NY, USA, 16th place; and 2012: 2man in St Moritz Switzerland, 18th place.

== Olympic results ==
Games	Event	Rank	Partners
2002 Salt Lake City	Four-man	25.	Boris Rađenović; Dalibor Ðurđić; Rašo Vucinić
2010 Vancouver	Four-man	18.	Igor Šarčević; Miloš Savić; Slobodan Matijević
2014 Sochi	Two-man	DNF	Aleksandar Bundalo

== Personal life ==
Following the 2010 Vancouver Winter Olympics, Vuk Rađenović married Astrid Loch-Wilkinson, of the Australian bobsleigh team. After the 2014 Sochi Olympic Games, and 4 years of marriage, Vuk had an affair with German Bobsledder Stefanie Szczurek, ultimately resulting in their divorce.
