= Randy Jones (bobsleigh) =

American bobsledder (born 1969)

Personal information
- Born: June 24, 1969 (age 57) Winston-Salem, North Carolina, U.S.
Medal record
Men's bobsleigh
Representing the United States
Olympic Games
Silver medal – second place	2002 Salt Lake City	Four-man
World Championships
Silver medal – second place	2003 Lake Placid	Four-man
Bronze medal – third place	1993 Igls	Four-man
Bronze medal – third place	1997 St. Moritz	Four-man

Randal "Randy" Jones (born June 24, 1969) is an American bobsledder. Jones competed in both the 2-man and 4-man events in four Winter Olympics.

== High school ==
Jones attended Robert B. Glenn High School in Kernersville, North Carolina, where he was a standout in both track and football. He was a big part in helping lead the school to a boys NCHSAA 3A/4A track state championship in 1986, winning the 200 m and 4x200 meter relay state championships. He was also named Most Outstanding Performer of the NCHSAA 3A/4A state championship meet. Jones senior year in 1987, he was the NCHSAA 4A state champion in the 100 meter and 200 meter.

== College career ==
Jones attended Duke University, where he played football and ran track, while earning a Mechanical Engineering degree. Graduating from Duke in 1991, he still holds five team football records for Duke in kick returns and was also a record-setting track athlete.

== Bobsledding career ==
Jones' track coach at Duke convinced him after graduating to try out for the U.S. Bobsled team. Combined with a desire to see the world, Jones accepted the invitation to join the team. He won the National Brakeman and Side Push Championship twice in both 1992 and 1995, along with the World Cup and Overall Championship in 1992–93.

Jones made his Olympic debut in 1994 in Lillehammer, finishing 13th in the 2-man event. He came up short in the 1998 Winter Olympics in Nagano as the 4-man team with driver Brian Shimer and pushers Chip Minton and Garrett Hines missed by .02 seconds of winning a bronze medal, finishing fifth.

After winning four World Cup medals, 2002 saw Jones have the best year of his career in bobsledding. At the 2002 Winter Olympics in Salt Lake City, Jones along with driver Todd Hays, won a silver medal in the 4-man event. This marked the first time since 1956 that the United States won a medal in men's bobsledding. Jones also won three medals in the four-man event at the FIBT World Championships with a silver (2003) and two bronzes (1993, 1997).

In 2005-06, Jones' best finish in the World Cup was second at the 4-man event held in Calgary, Alberta, Canada. He was at the 2006 Winter Olympics, but did not run in either competition. Jones is now part of the United States Olympic Committee and is widely considered as the most decorated bobsledder in U.S. history.

== Personal life ==
Jones is married to his wife, Cheri Alou, and currently resides in Atlanta, Georgia. Jones and his wife Cheri also have twins, Roman and Marissa, who reside with them in Atlanta, Georgia. Jones currently works as a Technology Director for Omnicom Media Group.
