= Zardo =

Zardo is a given name and a surname. Notable people with the name include:

- Emanuela Zardo (born 1970), Swiss tennis player
- Giulio Zardo (born 1980), Canadian athlete
- Zardo Domenios (born 1984), Filipino diver
