= Drpić =

Drpić is a surname. The Croatian census of 2011 listed it as one of the most common surnames in Pučišća.

Notable people with the surname include:

- Dino Drpić, a Croatian footballer
- Niki Drpić, a Croatian bobsledder
