= Bubble Pop =

Bubble Pop may refer to:

- Bubble Pop!, an EP by South Korean artist Hyuna
  - Bubble Pop! (song), the title track thereof
- "Bubble Pop Electric", a track from Gwen Stefani's 2004 album Love. Angel. Music. Baby.
- Bubble Pop, an independent news publication run by Canadian journalist Rachel Gilmore
- Physical phenomenon
  - Popping of a soap bubble
  - Popping bubble gum
