= Studnička =

Studnička (Czech/Slovak feminine: Studničková), or Studnicka, is a Czech and Slovak surname. Notable people with the surname include:

- František Josef Studnička (1836–1903), Czech mathematician
- Jack Studnicka (born 1999), Canadian ice hockey player
- Jan Studnicka (1883–1967), Austrian footballer
- Mary Lou Studnicka (1931–2014), American baseball player
- Milan Studnička (born 1977), Czech bobsledder

== See also ==
- 5552 Studnička, minor planet
