= Bundalo =

Bundalo is a Serbian surname. Notable people with the surname include:

- Uroš Bundalo (born 1989), Slovenian handball player
- Aleksandar Bundalo (born 1989), Serbian bobsledder
