= Ole Christian Strømberg =

Norwegian bobsledder

Personal information
- Born: 24 October 1972 (age 52) Narvik, Norway

Sport
- Sport: Bobsleigh

Ole Christian Strømberg (born 24 October 1972) is a Norwegian bobsledder, born in Narvik. He competed at the 2002 Winter Olympics in Salt Lake City, in men's four, together with Arnfinn Kristiansen, Mariusz Musial and Bjarne Røyland.
