= Michel André =

Michel André may refer to:

- Michel André (bobsleigh) (born 1970), French bobsledder
- Michel André (mathematician) (1936–2009), Swiss mathematician
- Michel André (actor)
