= Arbez (surname) =

Arbez is a surname. Notable people with the surname include:

- Alexandre Arbez (born 1978), French bobsledder.
- Carla Arbez (born 1999), French rugby union player.
- Maurice Arbez (1944–2020), French ski jumper.
- Pascal Arbez (Vitalic, born 1976), French electronic music producer.
- Tess Arbez (born 1997), Irish alpine skier.
- Victor Arbez (1934–2016), French skier.
