= Ðulijano Koludra =

Croatian bobsledder

Personal information
- Nationality: Croatian
- Born: 24 January 1974 (age 51); Split, Yugoslavia

Sport
- Sport: Bobsleigh

Ðulijano Koludra (born 24 January 1974) is a Croatian bobsledder. He competed in the four man event at the 2002 Winter Olympics.
