= Duff Gibson =

Canadian skeleton racer (born 1966)

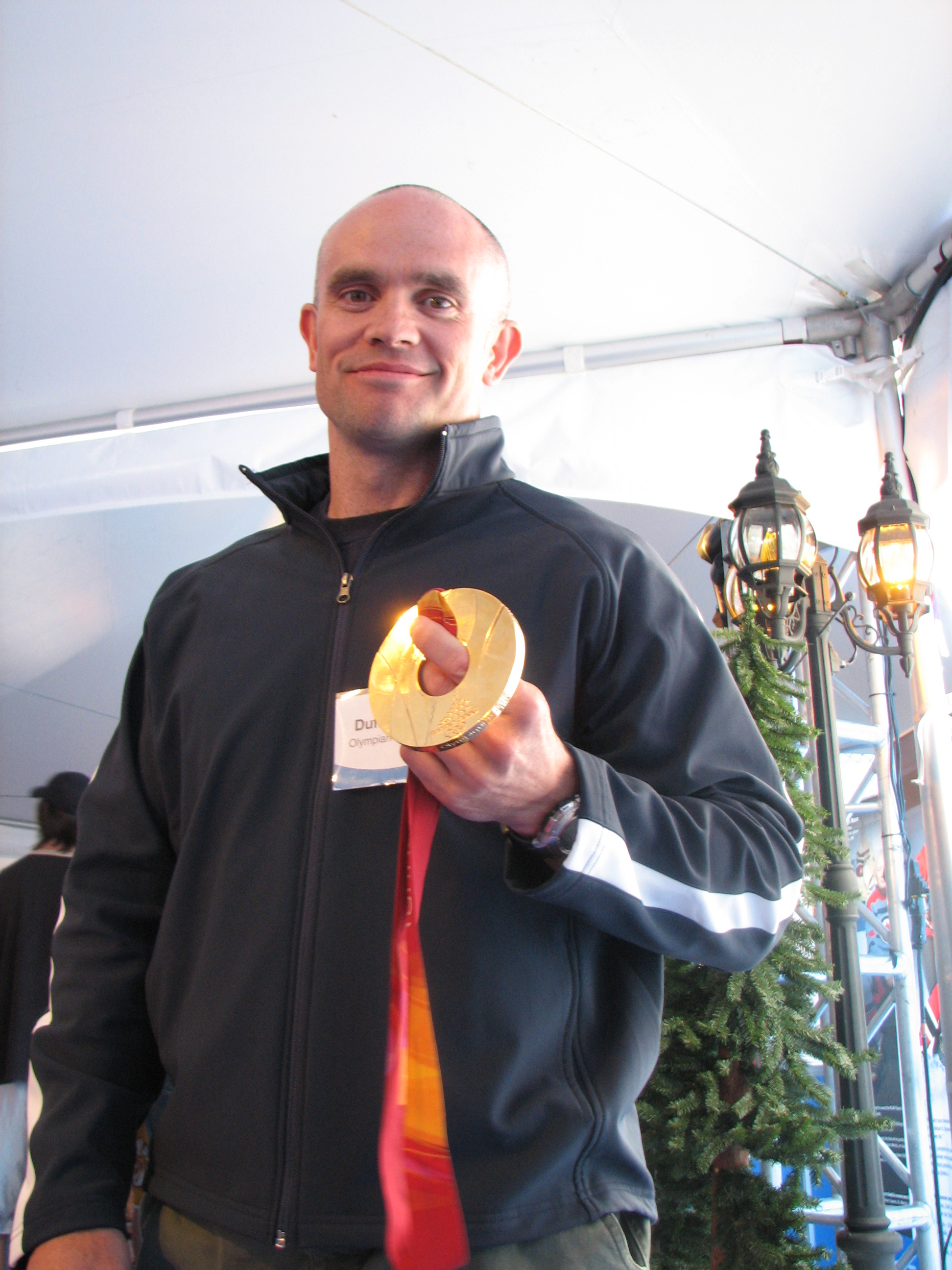

Personal information
- Born: August 11, 1966 (age 60) Vaughan, Ontario, Canada
Medal record
Skeleton
Representing Canada
Olympic Games
Gold medal – first place	2006 Turin	Men
World Championships
Gold medal – first place	2004 Königssee	Men
Bronze medal – third place	2005 Calgary	Men

Duff Gibson (born August 11, 1966) is a Canadian skeleton racer who competed from 1999 to 2006. He was born in Vaughan, Ontario. His father was born on December 13, 1937. At the 2006 Winter Olympics in Turin, He won the gold medal in the men's skeleton, narrowly beating out his teammate Jeff Pain. With his victory, the 39-year-old Gibson surpassed ice hockey player Al MacInnis as the oldest gold medalist in Canadian Winter Olympic history. More significantly, Gibson became the oldest individual gold medallist in the history of the Winter Games, a record previously held by Norway's Magnar Solberg, who was 35 when he won the gold medal in the 20 km individual biathlon event at the 1972 Winter Olympics in Sapporo; he held the record until Ole Einar Bjørndalen won gold at the 10 km biathlon sprint aged 40 at the 2014 Sochi Olympics. He retired immediately following the 2006 Games in Turin.

Gibson also finished tenth in the men's skeleton event at the 2002 Winter Olympics in Salt Lake City. He also won two medals in the men's skeleton event at the FIBT World Championships with a gold in 2004 and a bronze in 2005. Gibson's best overall seasonal Skeleton World Cup finish was second in the men's event in 2003–4.

In October 2009, Gibson is pairing up with the Stephen Lewis Foundation to raise money for HIV/AIDS affected families in Africa. The Gold medal Olympian carried a 20-litre jug of water approximately 12 km through Calgary from Canada Olympic Park to his son's school. The "dare" is part of the foundations current A Dare to Remember campaign.
