= Cristiano Rogério Paes =

Brazilian bobsledder

Personal information
- Born: 30 June 1974 (age 50); Santo André, Brazil

Sport
- Sport: Bobsleigh

Cristiano Rogério Paes (born 30 June 1974) is a Brazilian bobsledder. He competed in the four man event at the 2002 Winter Olympics.
