= André Lange =

German bobsledder (born 1973)

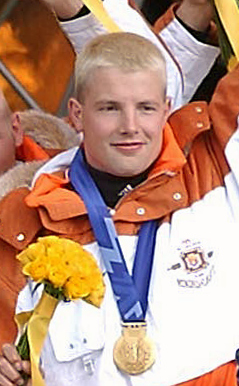
- Lange at the 2002 Olympics

Personal information
- Nationality: German
- Born: 28 June 1973 (age 53) Ilmenau, Bezirk Suhl, East Germany (now Ilmenau, Thuringia, Germany)
- Height: 1.88 m (6 ft 2 in)
- Weight: 100 kg (220 lb; 15 st 10 lb)

Sport
- Country: Germany
- Sport: Bobsleigh (pilot)
- Event(s): 4-man, 2-man
- Club: BSR Rennsteig Oberhof (1993–2010)
- Coached by: Wolfgang Hoppe
- Retired: 2010

Achievements and titles
- Personal best: 1st place, gold medalist(s) 2nd place, silver medalist(s)
Medal record
Representing Germany
Men´s Bobsleigh
Olympic Games
Gold medal – first place	2002 Salt Lake City	Four-man
Gold medal – first place	2006 Turin	Two-man
Gold medal – first place	2006 Turin	Four-man
Gold medal – first place	2010 Vancouver	Two-man
Silver medal – second place	2010 Vancouver	Four-man
World Championships
Gold medal – first place	2000 Altenberg	Four-man
Gold medal – first place	2003 Lake Placid	Two-man
Gold medal – first place	2003 Lake Placid	Four-man
Gold medal – first place	2004 Königssee	Four-man
Gold medal – first place	2005 Calgary	Four-man
Gold medal – first place	2007 St. Moritz	Two-man
Gold medal – first place	2008 Altenberg	Two-man
Gold medal – first place	2008 Altenberg	Four-man
Silver medal – second place	2000 Altenberg	Two-man
Silver medal – second place	2001 St. Moritz	Four-man
Silver medal – second place	2005 Calgary	Two-man
Silver medal – second place	2009 Lake Placid	Four-man
Bronze medal – third place	2004 Königssee	Two-man
Bronze medal – third place	2007 St. Moritz	Four-man
World Cup Championships
Gold medal – first place	2000–01	Combined
Gold medal – first place	2000–01	Four-man
Gold medal – first place	2002–03	Combined
Gold medal – first place	2002–03	Four-man
Gold medal – first place	2003–04	Combined
Gold medal – first place	2003–04	Four-man
Gold medal – first place	2007–08	Combined
Gold medal – first place	2007–08	Two-man
Gold medal – first place	2007–08	Four-man
Silver medal – second place	2001–02	Four-man
Silver medal – second place	2008–09	Two-man
Bronze medal – third place	1998–99	Four-man
Bronze medal – third place	2000–01	Two-man
Bronze medal – third place	2001–02	Combined
Bronze medal – third place	2002–03	Two-man
Bronze medal – third place	2003–04	Two-man
Bronze medal – third place	2006–07	Combined
Bronze medal – third place	2006–07	Two-man
Bronze medal – third place	2008–09	Combined
Bronze medal – third place	2008–09	Four-man
Bronze medal – third place	2009–10	Four-man
European Championships
Gold medal – first place	2000 Cortina d'Ampezzo	Two-man
Gold medal – first place	2002 Cortina d'Ampezzo	Four-man
Gold medal – first place	2004 St. Moritz	Four-man
Gold medal – first place	2005 Altenberg	Two-man
Gold medal – first place	2006 St. Moritz	Two-man
Gold medal – first place	2007 Cortina	Four-man
Gold medal – first place	2009 St. Moritz	Two-man
Gold medal – first place	2010 Igls	Four-man
Silver medal – second place	2002 Cortina d'Ampezzo	Two-man
Silver medal – second place	2003 Winterberg	Four-man
Silver medal – second place	2003 Winterberg	Two-man
Silver medal – second place	2005 Altenberg	Four-man
Silver medal – second place	2006 St. Moritz	Four-man
Silver medal – second place	2008 Cesana	Two-man
Silver medal – second place	2010 Igls	Two-man
Bronze medal – third place	2001 Königssee	Four-man
Bronze medal – third place	2004 St. Moritz	Two-man
Bronze medal – third place	2007 Cortina	Two-man
Bronze medal – third place	2008 Cesana	Four-man
German Championships
Gold medal – first place	2000 Cortina d'Ampezzo	Four-man
Gold medal – first place	2009 Winterberg	Four-man
World Junior Championships
Gold medal – first place	1998 Cortina d'Ampezzo	Two-man
Gold medal – first place	1998 Cortina d'Ampezzo	Four-man
Gold medal – first place	1999 Altenberg	Four-man
Men´s Wok
World Wok Racing Championships
Gold medal – first place	2009 Winterberg	Four-man
Gold medal – first place	2010 Oberhof	Four-man
Bronze medal – third place	2007 Innsbruck	Four-man

André Lange (German pronunciation: [ˈlaŋə]; born 28 June 1973) is a retired German bobsleigher and one of the most successful bob pilots of all time. Competing at the 2002, 2006 and 2010 Winter Olympics, he has won four gold and one silver medals. Lange originally started his sleighing career as a luger, taking up bobsleigh in 1993.

At the 2002 Winter Olympics, Lange won the four-man event with teammates Carsten Embach, Enrico Kühn and Kevin Kuske. At the 2006 Winter Olympics, Lange also won gold in the four-man event with teammates Kevin Kuske, René Hoppe and Martin Putze, in addition to winning the two-man event with Kuske. He competed in the 2010 Winter Olympics, winning gold in the two-man and silver in the four-man events.

Lange also won fourteen medals at the FIBT World Championships with eight golds (Two-man: 2003, 2007, 2008; Four-man: 2000, 2003, 2004, 2005, 2008), four silvers (Two-man: 2000, 2005; Four-man: 2001, 2009), and two bronzes (Two-man: 2004, Four-man: 2007).

At the Bobsleigh World Cup level, he has won three combined men's championships (2000-1, 2002–3, 2003–4), one two-man championship (2007–08), and four four-man championships (2000-1, 2002–3, 2003–4, 2007–8).

In April 2014 it was announced that Lange would become the head of the Thuringian Winter Sports Centre in Oberhof, which includes the DKB Ski Arena, the Oberhof sledding track, the Kanzlersgrund ski jumps and the town's indoor ski area, following the retirement of the previous head Wolfgang Filbrich that July. In May 2017 he announced that he was leaving this role. In August 2017 the Korea Luge Federation announced that Lange would join the South Korean luge team as a coach in October on a five-month contract to assist head coach Steffen Sartor to help prepare them for the 2018 Winter Olympics in Pyongchang, South Korea.

Olympic Games
Preceded by Kati Wilhelm	Flagbearer for Germany; Vancouver 2010	Succeeded by Maria Höfl-Riesch
