= Bohdan Zamostianyk =

Ukrainian bobsledder

Personal information
- Nationality: Ukrainian
- Born: 3 February 1975 (age 50); Kyiv, Ukraine

Sport
- Sport: Bobsleigh

Bohdan Zamostianyk (born 3 February 1975) is a Ukrainian bobsledder. He competed in the four man event at the 2002 Winter Olympics.
