= Braňo Prieložný =

Slovak bobsledder

Personal information
- Nationality: Slovak
- Born: 9 May 1968 (age 56); Bratislava, Czechoslovakia

Sport
- Sport: Bobsleigh

Braňo Prieložný (born 9 May 1968) is a Slovak bobsledder. He competed in the four man event at the 2002 Winter Olympics.
