= Bill Schuffenhauer =

American bobsledder

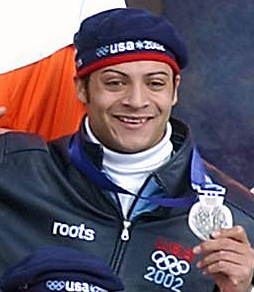

Personal information
- Born: June 24, 1973 (age 53)
- Height: 6 ft 0 in (1.83 m)
Medal record
Bobsleigh
Representing the United States
Olympic Games
Silver medal – second place	2002 Salt Lake City	Four-man
World Championships
Silver medal – second place	2003 Lake Placid	Four-man
Bronze medal – third place	2004 Königssee	Four-man

Bill Schuffenhauer (born June 24, 1973) is an American bobsledder who has competed since 2000. Competing in three Winter Olympics, he won the silver medal in the four-man event at Salt Lake City in 2002.

== Early years ==
Bill grew up in Salt Lake City, Utah and as a child, his mother was a prostitute and drug addict who was often beaten in front of him. He had to steal, to eat from trash cans, and once was caught trying to break into a bicycle store to try to steal something to sell for food.

The few friends he had were mostly in street gangs, and Bill drank and smoked cannabis often. His mother was often evicted, and he lived in foster homes. Schuffenhauer's maternal grandmother, Sadie Muniz, took him in as he was about to enter junior high in Roy, Utah. "She reminded me to never give up and always push on," he said.

== Athletic career ==
Because of his grandmother's influence, he began going to school and started to participate in track and field at Roy High School, due to his great speed. He persevered to become an Olympian, and his coaches encouraged him greatly as well. He soon became a decathlete. He went to Weber State University and there he won the junior nationals in 1992. Additionally he played American football in high school.

== Olympics career ==
Schuffenhauer's Olympics dream as a track and field athlete came to an end in 2000. While training for Sydney, he suffered a bad ankle injury and he could barely walk. When his friend told him that the U.S. Olympic team was practicing bobsledding in Park City, he took the chance to go and observe. While there, the team members noticed his 6-foot, 200 pound frame and asked him he wanted to be a pusher. He accepted and trained with the team from then on.

He was not originally slated to be a regular member, but was promoted when one of the U.S. four-man team members tested positive for steroids. That crew, piloted by Todd Hays, won a silver medal at the Salt Lake Games.

At the 2006 Winter Olympics in Torino, Italy, Bill's two-man team placed 14th, after which he retired. He had two children and he felt responsible for them. Bobsledders earn only a meager amount, but Bill made the tough decision to continue to aspire for qualification for Vancouver. He fought through a neck injury (2 herniated disks) with the help of a chiropractor and a team physician.

In January 2010, in St. Moritz, Switzerland, Bill and his 3 USA teammates placed sixth and qualified for Vancouver and it was officially announced on January 17, 2010, that Bill's team would represent the United States at Vancouver. They finished 13th in the four-man event.

"The dream is happening right now. I'm here. That's all I wanted," he said. Then he added, "It would be nice to get a medal of any color."

== Personal life ==
Schuffenhauer attempted suicide in 2016. He was saved by his girlfriend. Speculation has arisen that Schuffenhauer's attempt was related to brain trauma suffered during his bobsledding career, similar to CTE that boxers and other sportsmen who suffer repeated minor concussions face.

== Olympic career highlights ==
- 2002 Silver Medal in the four-man during the 2002 Olympic Games in Salt Lake City, Utah
- 2001-02 results in the four-man -GOLD in Verizon Champ Series (Race #2) (1/02), 4th in Verizon National Trials (10/01)
- 2002-2003 World Cup as brakeman for Todd Hays in the two-man -SILVER in Calgary (2/03), 8th in Winterberg (1/03), 5th in St. Moritz (1/03), 6th in Cortina (12/02), 4th in Igls (12/02)
- 2002-2003 World Cup as brakeman for Todd Hays in the two-man -5th in Calgary (2/03), 6th in Winterberg (1/03), 6th in Cortina (12/02), GOLD in Lake Placid (11/02)
- 2003 2003 four-man event with a silver
- 2004 2004 four-man event with a bronze
- 2004-2005 World Cup as push athlete for Todd Hays in the four-man -GOLD in Winterberg (11/04), GOLD in Altenberg (12/04), SILVER in Igls (12/04), 4th in Cortina (12/04), 5th in four-man bobsled at World Championships in Calgary (2/05)
- 2004-2005 World Cup as brakeman for driver Todd Hays in the two-man -9th in Cortina (12/04)
- 2005-2006 World Cup as push athlete for Steve Holcomb and Todd Hays in the four-man-9th in Calagary (11/05), 6th in Lake Placid (11/05), 4th in Igls (12/05), GOLD in Cortina (12/05), 11th in Konigssee (1/06)
- 2005-2006 World Cups as brakeman for Steve Holcomb in the two-man-8th in Konigssee (01/06)
- 2006 Olympian at Torino Games finishing sixth in the four-man and 14th in the two-man
- 2008-2009 World Cup as push athlete in the four-man -13th in Winterberg (11/09), 19th in Altenberg (12/08), 9th in Igls (12/08), 9th in Konigssee (1/09), 5th in St. Moritz (1/09), 5th in Whistler (2/09)-9th at World Championships in Lake Placid (2/09)
- 2009-2010 World Cup as push athlete for Mike Kohn in the four-man-14th in Lake Placid (11/09), 22nd in Konigssee (1/10), 6th in St. Moritz (1/10), 17th in Igls (1/10)
- 2009-2010 World Cup as push athlete for Mike Kohn in the two-man -18th in Igls (1/10)
- 2009 U.S. Bobsled Push Championship took 9th
- 2010 Vancouver finished 13th in the four-man event
