= Jānis Silarājs =

Latvian bobsledder

Personal information
- Nationality: Latvian
- Born: 3 May 1976 (age 48); Riga, Latvia

Sport
- Sport: Bobsleigh

Jānis Silarājs (born 3 May 1976) is a Latvian bobsledder. He competed in the four man event at the 2002 Winter Olympics.
