= Mike Savitch =

American bobsledder

Personal information
- Nationality: American Virgin Islander
- Born: November 25, 1973 (age 51)

Sport
- Sport: Bobsleigh

Mike Savitch (born November 25, 1973) is a bobsledder who represented the United States Virgin Islands. He competed in the four-man event at the 2002 Winter Olympics.
