= Giona Cividino =

Italian bobsledder (born 1974)

Personal information
- Nationality: Italian
- Born: 5 June 1974 (age 50); San Daniele del Friuli, Italy

Sport
- Sport: Bobsleigh

Giona Cividino (born 5 June 1974) is an Italian bobsledder. He competed in the four man event at the 2002 Winter Olympics.
