= FIBT World Championships 2004 =

Bobsleigh and skeleton competition

2004 World Championships
- Location: Konigssee, Germany

The FIBT World Championships 2004 took place in Königssee, Germany for the fourth time, doing so previously in 1979, 1986, and 1990 (Skeleton). This marked the first time all the events were in a single location at the championships since the 1996 event in Calgary, Alberta, Canada.

== Bobsleigh ==
=== Two man ===
Pos	Team	Time
Gold	Canada (Pierre Lueders, Giulio Zardo)	
Silver	Germany (Christoph Langen, Markus Zimmermann)	
Bronze	Germany (André Lange, Kevin Kuske)	

=== Four man ===
Pos	Team	Time
Gold	Germany (André Lange, Udo Lehmann. Kevin Kuske, René Hoppe)	
Silver	Germany (Christoph Langen, Christoph Heyder, Enrico Kühn, Jens Nohka)	
Bronze	United States (Todd Hays, Pavel Jovanovic, Bill Schuffenhauer, Steve Mesler)	

=== Two woman ===
Pos	Team	Time
Gold	Germany (Susi Erdmann, Kristina Bader)	
Silver	Germany (Sandra Prokoff, Anja Schneiderheinze)	
Bronze	United States (Jean Racine, Vonetta Flowers)	

Erdmann earned her third straight championship medal with her third different brakewoman. Fourth-place finisher Yvonne Cernota was brakewoman with Cathleen Martini. Cernota would die less than two weeks after the World championships on the same track in a bobsleigh accident.

== Skeleton ==
=== Men ===
Pos	Athlete	Time
Gold	Duff Gibson (CAN)	
Silver	Florian Grassl (GER)	
Bronze	Frank Kleber (GER)	

=== Women ===
Pos	Athlete	Time
Gold	Diane Sartor (GER)	
Silver	Lindsay Alcock (CAN)	
Bronze	Kerstin Jürgens (GER)	

== Medal table ==
Rank	Nation	Gold	Silver	Bronze	Total
1	Germany (GER)	3	4	3	10
2	Canada (CAN)	2	1	0	3
3	United States (USA)	0	0	2	2
Totals (3 entries)		5	5	5	15
