= Boris Lovrić =

Croatian bobsledder

Personal information
- Nationality: Croatian
- Born: 23 June 1975 (age 49); Split, Yugoslavia

Sport
- Sport: Bobsleigh

Boris Lovrić (born 23 June 1975) is a Croatian bobsledder. He competed in the four man event at the 2002 Winter Olympics.
