= Philippe Paviot =

French bobsledder

Personal information
- Nationality: French
- Born: 18 July 1972 (age 52); Pau, France

Sport
- Sport: Bobsleigh

Philippe Paviot (born 18 July 1972) is a French bobsledder. He competed in the four man event at the 2002 Winter Olympics.
