= Yvonne Cernota =

German bobsledder (1979–2004)

Medal record

Women's Bobsleigh

Representing Germany

World Championships
Bronze medal – third place	2003 Winterberg	Two-woman

Yvonne Cernota (19 September 1979 in Halberstadt, East Germany – 12 March 2004) was a German bobsledder who competed from 2000 to 2004 at the position of the brakeswomen. She won a bronze medal in the two-woman event at the 2003 FIBT World Championships in Winterberg.

She was part of Cathleen Martini's bobsled team. Their team won the European Championship and finished fourth at the World Championships in Königssee.

On March 12, 2004, Cernota was piloting a bobsled during a training run on the bobsleigh, luge, and skeleton track in Königssee when, in the lower section of the track, she struck the inner barrier at a sharp angle on a curve and was thrown from the track. She sustained severe head injuries in the accident and died en route to the hospital in Berchtesgaden. It was the first bobsleigh fatality since 1990 and the 42nd overall in the Winter Olympic program since 1924. At the time of her death, Cernota was a student majoring in biochemistry.
