= Gunārs Bumbulis =

Latvian bobsledder (born 1974)

Personal information
- Born: 10 October 1974 (age 50); Ventspils, Latvia
- Height: 178 cm (5 ft 10 in)
- Weight: 87 kg (192 lb)

Sport
- Country: Latvia
- Sport: Bobsleigh

Gunārs Bumbulis (born 10 October 1974) is a Latvian bobsledder. He competed in the four man event at the 2002 Winter Olympics.
