= Dave McCalla =

British bobsledder

Personal information
- Nationality: British
- Born: 23 May 1973 (age 52); Coventry, England

Sport
- Sport: Bobsleigh

Dave McCalla (born 23 May 1973) is a British bobsledder.

McCalla competed in the four man event at the 2002 Winter Olympics in Salt Lake City, after six years on the national team. He had previously represented Great Britain at the World Championships.

Outside of his sporting career, McCalla worked as a Royal Air Force (RAF) technician. His cousin is England international rugby player Jeremy Guscott.
