= Yekaterina Mironova =

Russian skeleton racer (born 1977)

Medal record

Skeleton

World Championships
Silver medal – second place	2003 Nagano	Women

Yekaterina Mironova (sometimes listed as Ekaterina Mironova born 3 November 1977) is a Russian skeleton racer who competed from 2000 to 2007. She won a silver medal in the women's skeleton event at the 2003 FIBT World Championships in Nagano.

Mironova also finished tied for seventh (with Germany's Steffi Hanzlik) in the women's skeleton event at the 2002 Winter Olympics in Salt Lake City.
