= Bruno Thomas =

French bobsledder

Personal information
- Nationality: French
- Born: 3 July 1969 (age 55); Saint-Martin-d'Hères, France

Sport
- Sport: Bobsleigh

Bruno Thomas (born 3 July 1969) is a French bobsledder. He competed in the four man event at the 2002 Winter Olympics.
