= Kevin Kuske =

German bobsledder (born 1979)

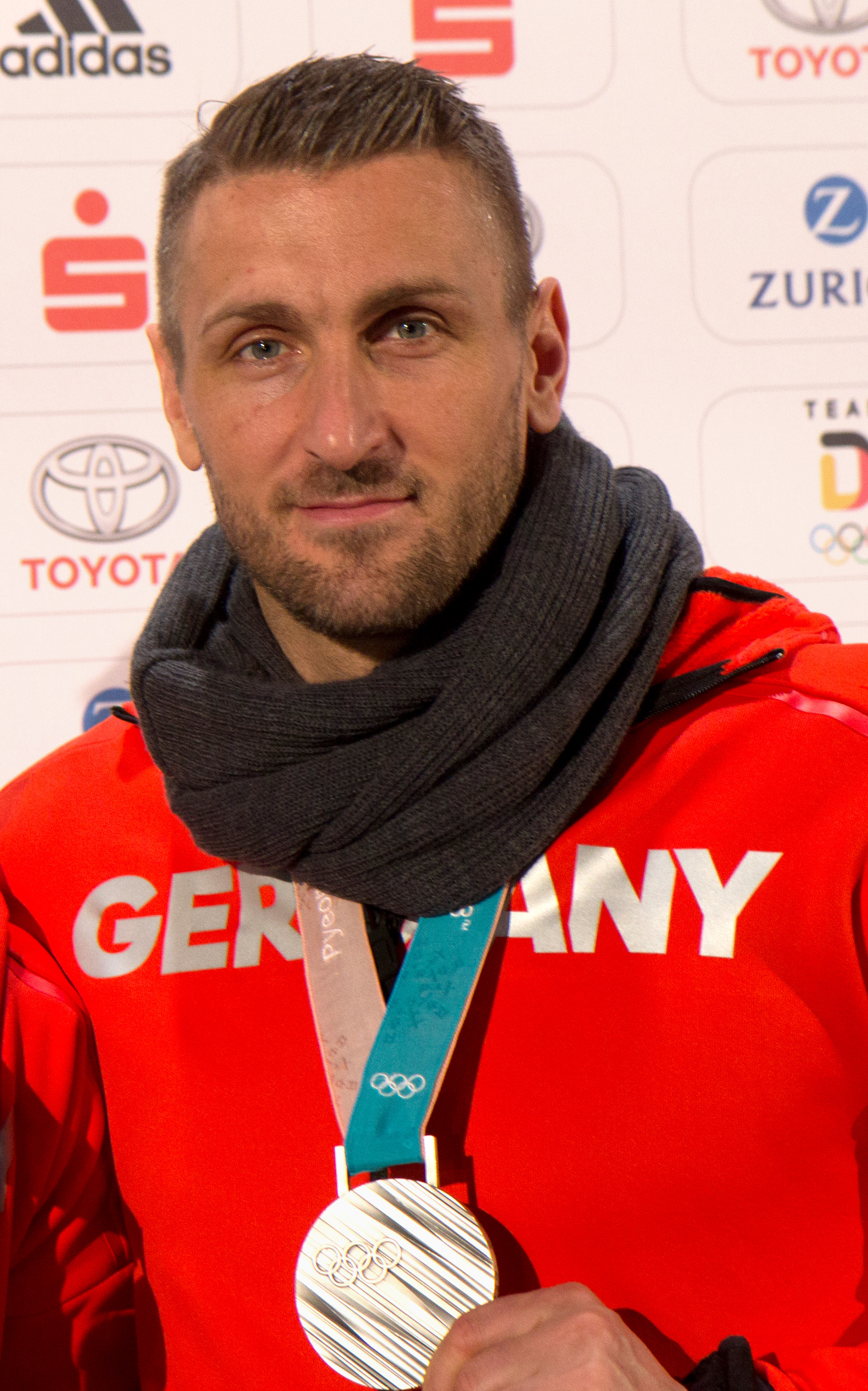
- Kuske in 2018

Personal information
- Nationality: German
- Born: 4 January 1979 (age 47) Potsdam, East Germany
- Height: 1.96 m (6 ft 5 in)

Sport
- Country: Germany
- Sport: Bobsleigh
- Event(s): 4-man, 2-man
- Club: BSR Rennsteig Oberhof (1999–2010); BRC Riesa (2010–present)

Achievements and titles
- Personal best: 1st place, gold medalist(s) 2nd place, silver medalist(s)
Medal record
Olympic Games
Gold medal – first place	2002 Salt Lake City	Four-man
Gold medal – first place	2006 Turin	Two-man
Gold medal – first place	2006 Turin	Four-man
Gold medal – first place	2010 Vancouver	Two-man
Silver medal – second place	2010 Vancouver	Four-man
Silver medal – second place	2018 Pyeongchang	Four-man
World Championships
Gold medal – first place	2003 Lake Placid	Two-man
Gold medal – first place	2003 Lake Placid	Four-man
Gold medal – first place	2004 Königssee	Four-man
Gold medal – first place	2005 Calgary	Four-man
Gold medal – first place	2007 St. Moritz	Two-man
Gold medal – first place	2008 Altenberg	Two-man
Gold medal – first place	2008 Altenberg	Four-man
Silver medal – second place	2005 Calgary	Two-man
Silver medal – second place	2009 Lake Placid	Four-man
Silver medal – second place	2011 Königssee	Two-man
Silver medal – second place	2012 Lake Placid	Four-man
Bronze medal – third place	2004 Königssee	Two-man
Bronze medal – third place	2007 St. Moritz	Four-man
Bronze medal – third place	2012 Lake Placid	Two-man
Bronze medal – third place	2017 Königssee	Four-man
European Championships
Gold medal – first place	2002 Cortina d'Ampezzo	Four-man
Gold medal – first place	2004 St. Moritz	Four-man
Gold medal – first place	2006 St. Moritz	Two-man
Gold medal – first place	2007 Cortina d'Ampezzo	Four-man
Gold medal – first place	2010 Igls	Four-man
Silver medal – second place	2002 Cortina d'Ampezzo	Two-man
Silver medal – second place	2003 Winterberg	Two-man
Silver medal – second place	2006 St. Moritz	Four-man
Silver medal – second place	2008 Cesena	Two-man
Silver medal – second place	2010 Igls	Two-man
Bronze medal – third place	2004 St. Moritz	Two-man
Bronze medal – third place	2007 Cortina d'Ampezzo	Two-man
Bronze medal – third place	2008 Cesana	Four-man
German Championships
Gold medal – first place	2009 Winterberg	Four-man
Bronze medal – third place	2009 Winterberg	Two-man
Men's athletics
World Junior Championships
Bronze medal – third place	1998 Annecy	4 x 100 metres

Kevin Kuske (born 4 January 1979) is a former German bobsledder who competed from 1999 to 2018. Competing in five Winter Olympics, he is the most successful Olympic athlete in bobsledding, winning four gold medals and two silver medals.

== Career ==
Prior to his bobsleigh career, Kuske was a sprinter athlete, and won a bronze medal in 4 x 100 m at the 1998 World Junior Championships in Athletics.

At the 2002 Winter Olympics in Salt Lake City, Kuske, along with teammates André Lange, Carsten Embach, Enrico Kühn, won the gold medal in the four-man event. Four years later in Turin, Kuske paired with Lange to win the gold medal in the two-man event, while those two, along with teammates René Hoppe and Martin Putze, won gold in the four-man event. Kuske won gold in the two-man and silver in the four-man event at the 2010 Winter Olympics in Vancouver.

Kuske also has fifteen medals at the IBSF World Championships, including seven golds (two-man: 2003, 2007, 2008; four-man: 2003, 2004, 2005, 2008), four silvers (two-man: 2005, 2011; four-man: 2009, 2012), and four bronzes (two-man: 2004, 2012; four-man: 2007, 2017).

After pilot André Lange's retirement in 2010, Kevin Kuske started with pilots Thomas Florschütz and Maximilian Arndt. With Florschütz, he competed at the 2014 Winter Olympics in Sochi in both the two-man and four-man event, but failed to win any medals. After Florschütz and Arndt retired, Kuske joined the team of Nico Walther. In Walther's bobsleigh, Kuske won a silver medal in the four-man event at the 2018 Winter Olympics in Pyeongchang, therefore becoming the most successful bobsledder in Olympic history. Immediately after the Games, he announced his retirement.
