= Brady Canfield =

American skeleton racer (born 1963)

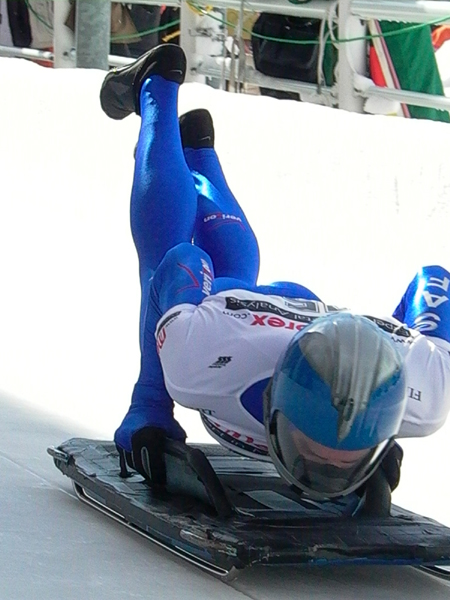
- Canfield circa 2003
Medal record
Men's Skeleton
Representing the United States
World Championships
Bronze medal – third place	2003 Nagano	Men

Brady Canfield (born April 26, 1963) is an American skeleton racer who competed from 1997 to 2004. He won a bronze medal in the men's skeleton event at the 2003 FIBT World Championships in Nagano.

A native of Red Lodge, Montana, Canfield served in the United States Air Force from 1987 to 2007, retiring as a major. He now lives in Park City, Utah where he creates graphic novels including Wombat Rue. Brady is married to Felicia Canfield, former USA skeleton athlete, attorney and managing editor of Brady Comics.

== See also ==
Skeleton (sport)
