= Stefan Barucha =

German bobsledder

Personal information
- Nationality: German
- Born: 3 April 1977 (age 49) Hennigsdorf, East Germany

Sport
- Sport: Bobsleigh

Stefan Barucha (born 3 April 1977) is a German bobsledder. He competed in the four-man event at the 2002 Winter Olympics.
