= Mike Kohn =

American bobsledder

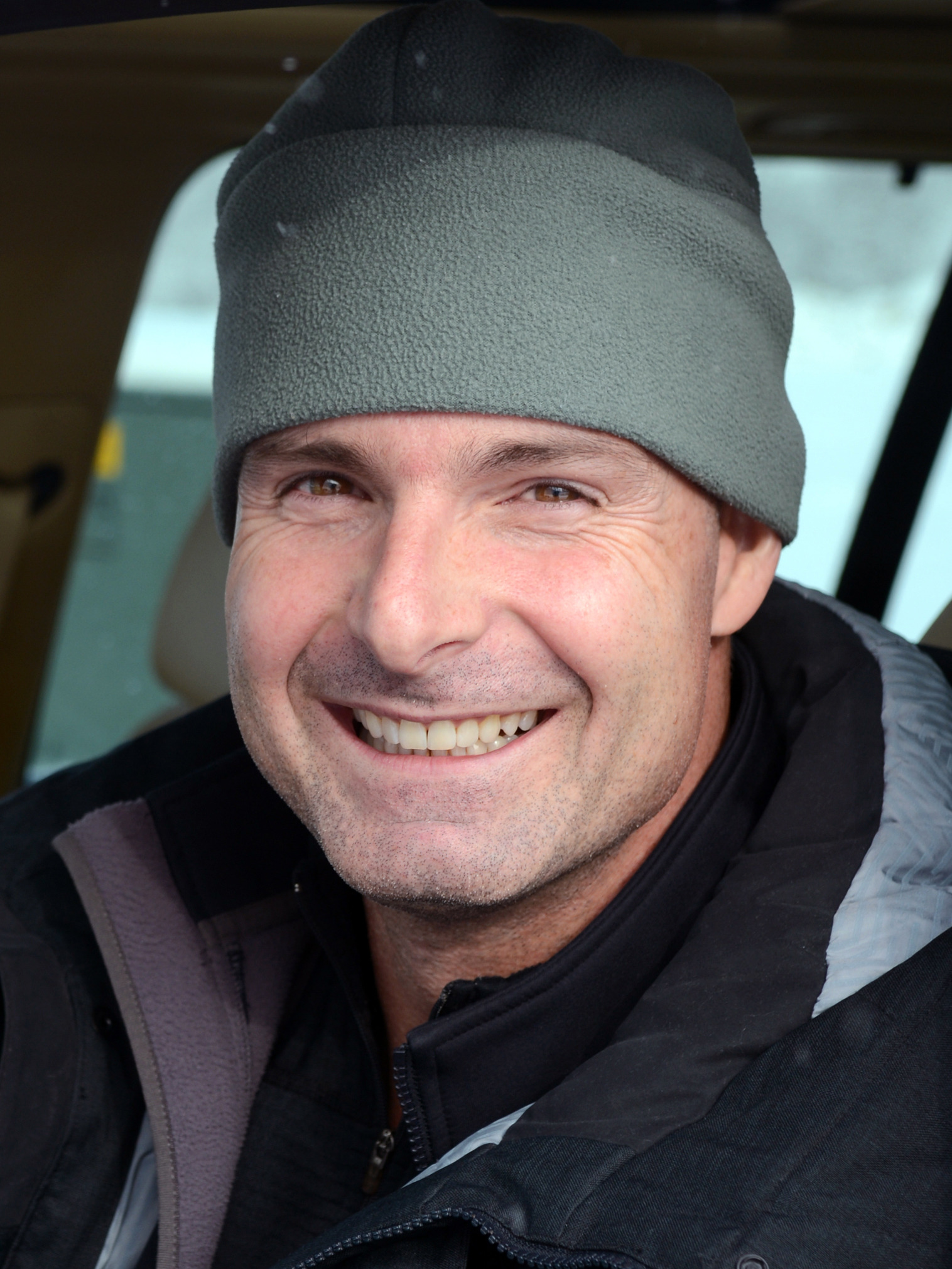
- Kohn in 2013

Personal information
- Born: May 26, 1972 (age 54) Columbia, South Carolina, U.S.
- Height: 6 ft 1 in (1.85 m)
- Weight: 216 lb (98 kg)

Sport
- Sport: Bobsleigh
- Club: George Mason Patriots, Fairfax; U.S. Army
Medal record
Men's bobsleigh
Representing the United States
Olympic Games
Bronze medal – third place	2002 Salt Lake City	Four-man
World Championships
Silver medal – second place	2007 St. Moritz	Mixed team

Michael Kohn (born May 26, 1972) is an American former bobsledder who has competed since 1990. Competing in two Winter Olympics, he won a bronze medal in the four-man event at Salt Lake City in 2002 as a push athlete for pilot Brian Shimer.

He also won a silver medal in the mixed bobsleigh-skeleton team event at the 2007 FIBT World Championships in St. Moritz.

Kohn retired from competition after the 2010 Winter Olympics. He was appointed as an assistant coach by the United States Bobsled and Skeleton Federation in 2011.

Kohn is also an Infantry Captain in the United States Army. A native of Columbia, South Carolina, he now lives in Myrtle Beach, South Carolina with his wife Jessica, and two sons, Oliver and max kohn.

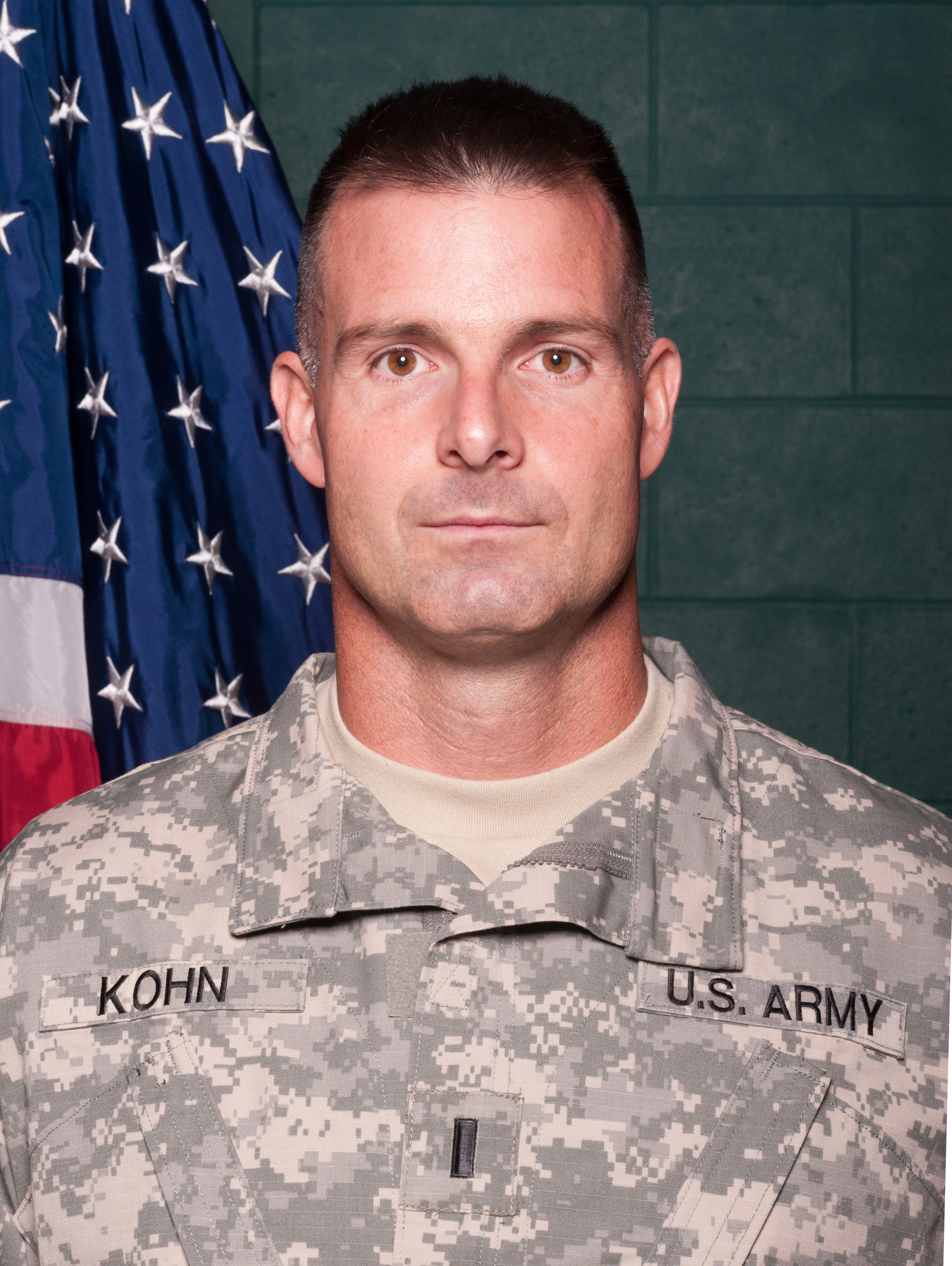
Mike Kohn in 2013.
