= FIBT World Championships 2003 =

Bobsleigh and skeleton competition

2003 World Championships
- Location: Lake Placid, New York; Winterberg, Germany; Nagano, Japan

The FIBT World Championships 2003 took place in Lake Placid, New York, United States (Men's bobsleigh), Winterberg, Germany (Women's bobsleigh), and Nagano, Japan (Men's and women's Skeleton). Lake Placid hosted the championship event for the eighth time, doing so previously in 1949, 1961, 1969, 1973, 1978, 1983, and 1997 (Skeleton). Winterberg hosted the championship event for a third time, doing so previously in 1995 (Bobsleigh) and 2000 (Women's bobsleigh). This was Nagano's first time hosting a championship event. It was also the first time the championships were held in Asia.

== Bobsleigh ==
=== Two man ===
Pos	Team	Time
Gold	Germany (André Lange, Kevin Kuske)	
Silver	Canada (Pierre Lueders, Giulio Zardo)	
Bronze	Germany (René Spies, Franz Sagmeister)	

=== Four man ===
Pos	Team	Time
Gold	Germany (André Lange, René Hoppe. Kevin Kuske, Carsten Embach)	
Silver	United States (Todd Hays, Bill Schuffenhauer, Randy Jones, Garrett Hines)	
Bronze	Russia (Alexander Zubkov, Aleskey Seliverstov, Sergey Golubev, Dmitriy Stepushkin)	

=== Two woman ===
Pos	Team	Time
Gold	Germany (Susi Erdmann, Annegret Dietrich)	
Silver	Germany (Sandra Prokoff, Ulrike Holzner)	
Bronze	Germany (Cathleen Martini, Yvonne Cernota)	

== Skeleton ==
=== Men ===
Pos	Athlete	Time
Gold	Jeff Pain (CAN)	
Silver	Chris Soule (USA)	
Bronze	Brady Canfield (USA)	

=== Women ===
Pos	Athlete	Time
Gold	Michelle Kelly (CAN)	
Silver	Yekaterina Mironova (RUS)	
Bronze	Tristan Gale (USA)	

== Medal table ==
Rank	Nation	Gold	Silver	Bronze	Total
1	Germany (GER)	3	1	2	6
2	Canada (CAN)	2	1	0	3
3	United States (USA)	0	2	2	4
4	Russia (RUS)	0	1	1	2
Totals (4 entries)		5	5	5	15
