= Yuriy Zhuravskyi =

Ukrainian bobsledder

Yuriy Zhuravskyi Yurii Zhuravskyi
Personal information
- Nationality: Ukrainian
- Born: 10 April 1974 (age 50); Kyiv, Ukraine

Sport
- Sport: Bobsleigh

Yuriy Zhuravskyi or Yurii Zhuravskyi, sometimes Yuriy Zhuravskiy (born 10 April 1974) is a Ukrainian former bobsledder and decathlete. He competed in the four man bobsleigh event at the 2002 Winter Olympics. In decathlon, he won a national title at the Ukrainian Athletics Championships in 1999.
