= Teodor Demetriad =

Romanian bobsledder

Personal information
- Nationality: Romanian
- Born: 30 January 1978 (age 47); Bucharest, Romania

Sport
- Sport: Bobsleigh

Teodor Demetriad (born 30 January 1978) is a Romanian bobsledder. He competed in the four man event at the 2002 Winter Olympics.
