= United States Bobsled and Skeleton Federation =

National governing body

United States Bobsled/Skeleton
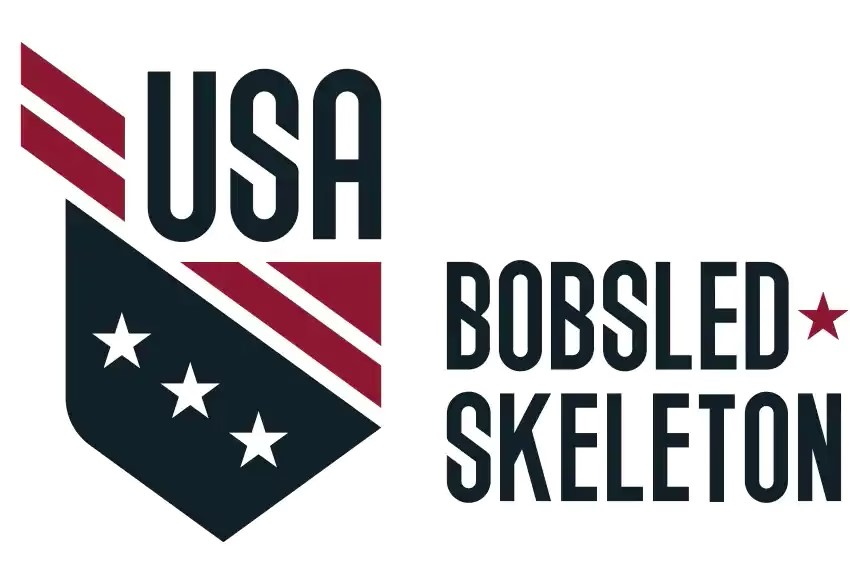
- Predecessor: USBSF (United States Bobsled and Skeleton Federation)
- Type: National governing body (NGB)
- Purpose: Organize competitive bobsled and skeleton in the USA
- Headquarters: Lake Placid, New York, U.S.
- Region served: United States
- CEO: Aron McGuire
- Affiliations: International Bobsleigh and Skeleton Federation
- Website: www.usabs.com

USA Bobsled/Skeleton (USABS) is the official national governing body (NGB) for Bobsled and Skeleton in the United States. It serves as the American representative for the International Bobsleigh and Skeleton Federation and is chartered by the United States Olympic & Paralympic Committee.

USABS is headquartered in Lake Placid, NY. The organization formerly used the name "United States Bobsled and Skeleton Federation" or USBSF.

== Racing Circuits and Operations ==
The bobsled and skeleton teams compete on the two levels within the IBSF, a development level and a world cup level. The Development Team competes on the North American Cup and European Cup while the National Team generally competes on the World Cup. In an Olympic year, the teams that compete on the World Cup will usually carry directly into the Winter Olympic Games.

=== North American Cup ===
The North American Cup (NAC) consists of tracks in North America. These tracks are located in Lake Placid NY, Park City UT, and Whistler BC. There was formerly a track located in Calgary AB, but it has been closed since the 2019 season.

=== European Cup ===
The European Cup (EC) is another development level circuit that races only on tracks in Europe.

=== World Cup ===
The World Cup (WC) races on tracks in any location around the world (North America, Europe, and Asia). Bobsled teams and Skeleton athletes gain points through placement in races throughout the season and race in the World Championships (generally held in February) each year. The location for World Championships and World Cup races change from year to year. Tracks from the NAC and EC are used for the World Cup.

=== Basics of Bobsled and Skeleton ===
In modern day bobsled, men compete in two disciplines, 4-man and 2-man. Women also compete in two disciples, those being 2-woman and mono-bob. Skeleton athletes always compete solo, unlike Luge, which does have a doubles event.

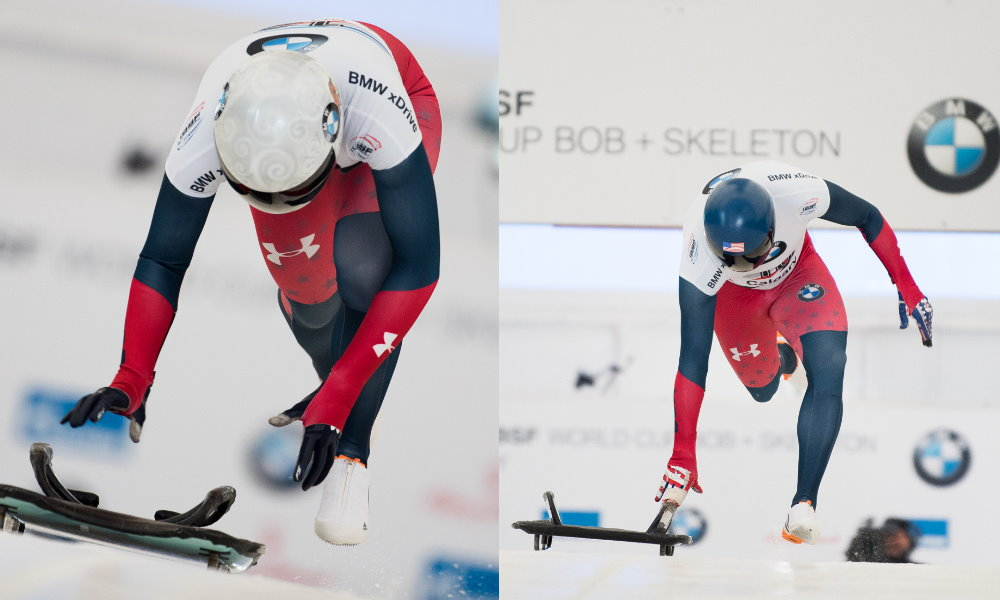
USA Skeleton Athletes pushing the sled at the beginning of a race

Bobsled and Skeleton are managed under the IBSF and are a separate entity from luge, although the three together are considered to be under the umbrella of "sliding sports." All three sports utilize the same tracks, with luge having different start gates at the top of each track. This is because in luge, the athlete pulls themselves to start while in bobsled and skeleton, the athletes push the sled from a running position in the grooves cut into the start area. These start areas are much longer to give athletes time to accelerate the sled to max velocity before getting in.

Those who drive the bobsled down the track are referred to as Pilots or Drivers and sit in the front of the sled and steer the runners using the ring and rope system inside. The other athletes are referred to as Push Athletes and do not contribute to the movement of the sled once they hop in. The Brakeman is the rear-most athlete in the sled in both 2-man and 4-man and they pull the brakes when the bobsled reaches the very end of the run, which is generally an uphill portion of the track.

=== Recruitment ===
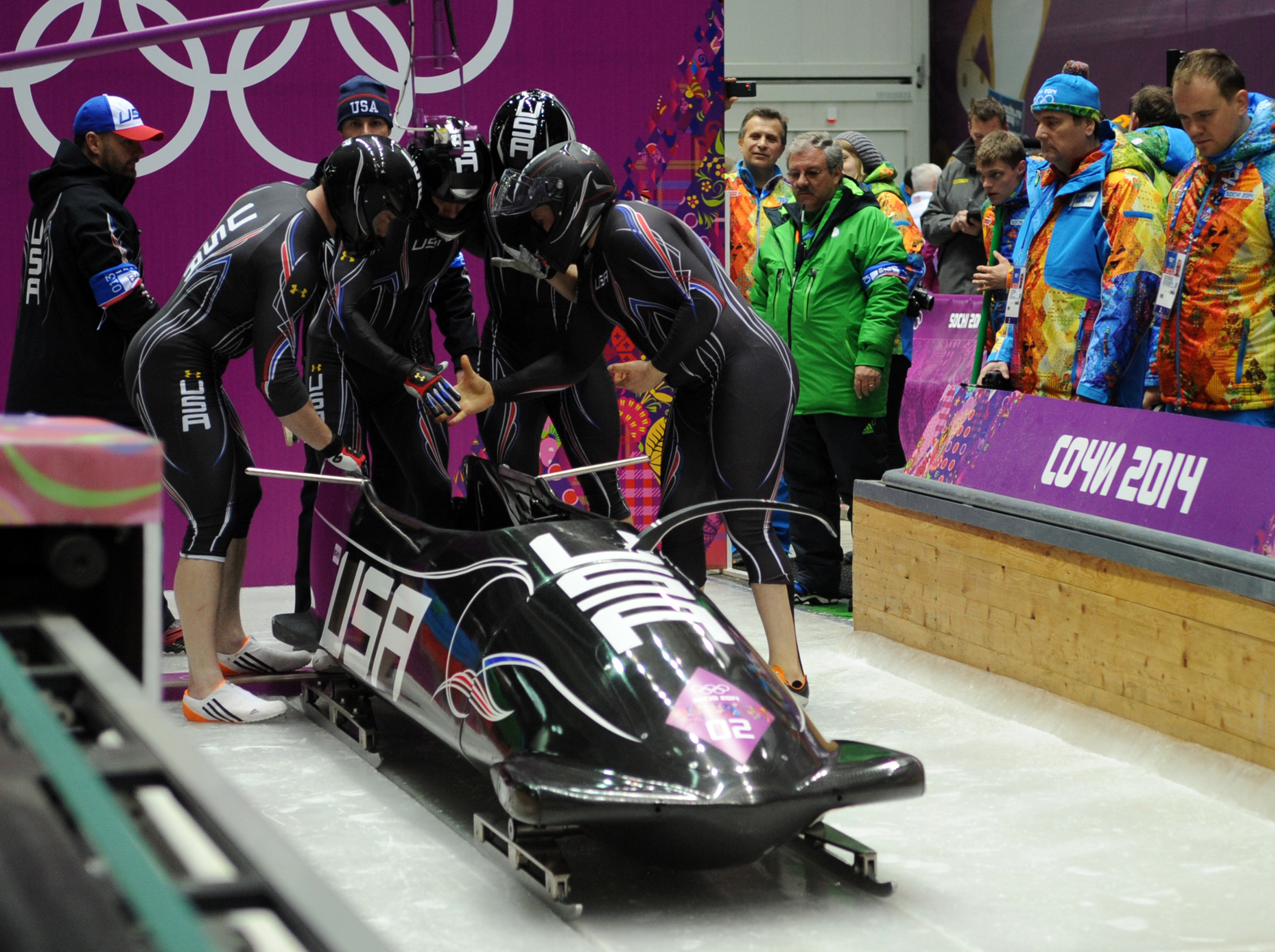
One of the United States 4-man bobsled teams on the start line at the 2014 Olympics

USABS recruits athletes from around the United States that have competed in a wide background of sports. Sports with a large emphasis on power and speed generally develop skills that transfer the best. Common sporting backgrounds for athletes that have made Team USA include football and track & field. Although athletes from other sports have made World Cup teams as well. Due to the high level of collegiate sports in the United States, many athletes that enter training and competition for USABS have generally already completed all of their years at a university and step into Bobsled or Skeleton in their early to mid twenties.

Coaches for Team USA host "combines" in various cities throughout the United States each summer to recruit, but in recent years, they have also allowed athletes to submit video of athletic feats through a virtual combine.

== Bobsled Olympic Medal table ==
Rank	Nation	Gold	Silver	Bronze	Total
1	United States	7	7	10	24
Totals (1 entries)		7	7	10	24

== Skeleton Olympic Medal table ==
Rank	Nation	Gold	Silver	Bronze	Total
1	United States	3	4	1	8
Totals (1 entries)		3	4	1	8

== Notable Athletes ==
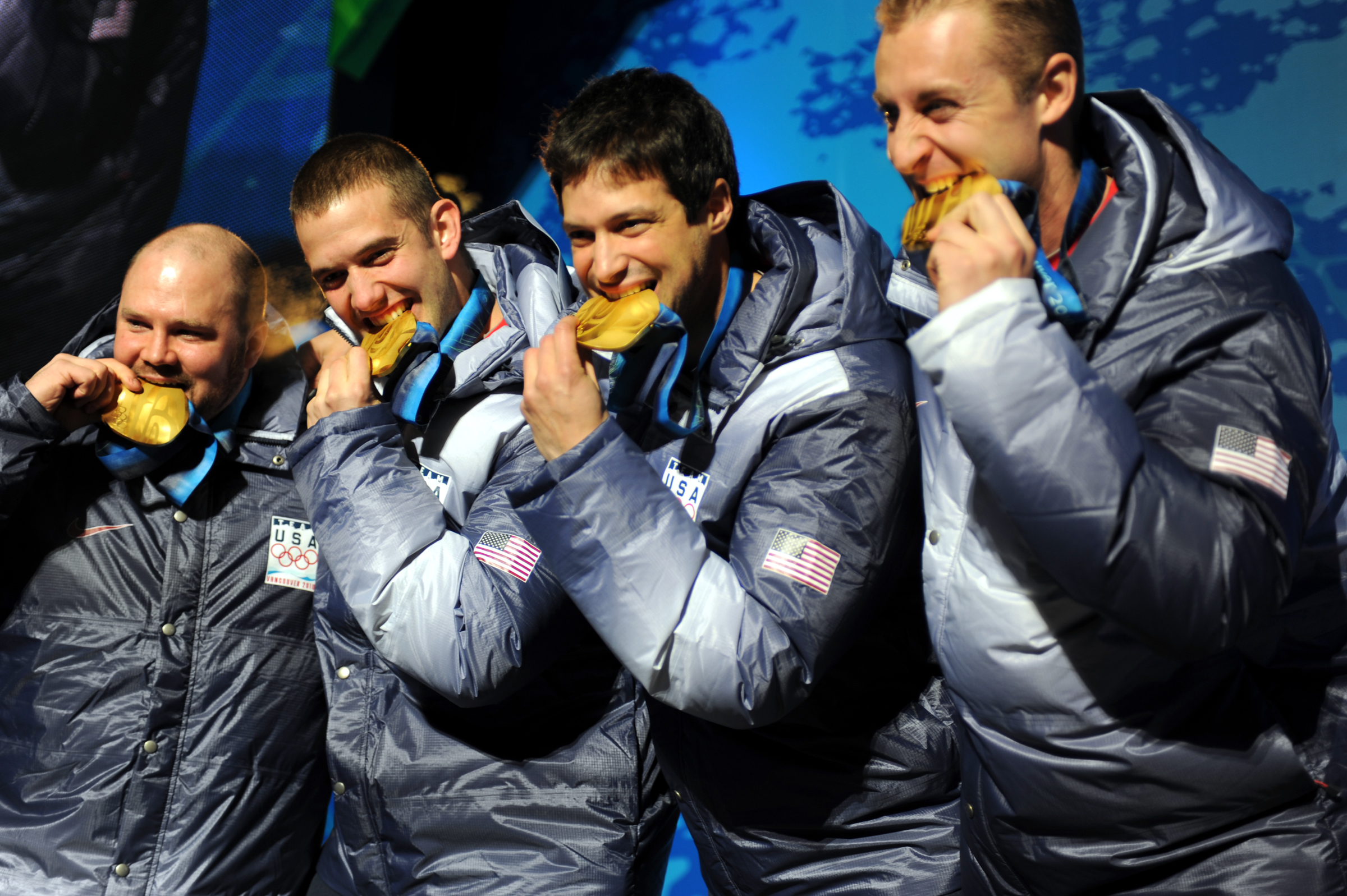
Left to right: Steve Holcomb, Justin Olsen, Steve Mesler, Curt Tomasevicz

- Steven Holcomb
- Katie Uhlaender
- Shauna Rohbock
- Curt Tomasevicz
- Steven Langton
- Sam McGuffie
- Matt Antoine
- John Daly
- Andrew Blaser
- Elana Meyers-Taylor
- Kaillie Humphries
- Brian Shimer
- Jill Bakken
- Jimmy Shea
- Garrett Hines
- Steve Mesler
- Noelle Pikus-Pace
- Chris Fogt
- Lolo Jones
- Justin Olsen
- Manteo Mitchell
- Justin Orr
