= Arnold van Calker =

Dutch bobsledder (born 1976)

Oltman Jan ("Arnold") van Calker (born 16 September 1976, Gasselternijveenschemond) is a Dutch bobsledder, who has competed since 1999. His best World Cup finish was second in the four-man event Königssee, Germany in January 2009.

Van Calker also finished 17th in the four-man event at the 2002 Winter Olympics in Salt Lake City. He also finished 23rd in the two-man event at the FIBT World Championships 2005 in Calgary.
