= René Hoppe =

German bobsledder (born 1976)

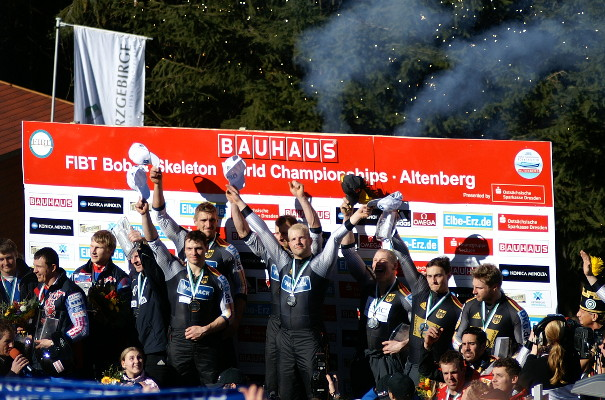

Personal information
- Nationality: German
- Born: 9 December 1976 (age 49) Oelsnitz, Saxony, East Germany
- Height: 1.85 m (6 ft 1 in)
- Weight: 95 kg (209 lb; 15.0 st)

Sport
- Country: Germany
- Sport: Bobsleigh

Achievements and titles
- Olympic finals: 1st place, gold medalist(s)
Medal record
Men's Bobsleigh
Representing Germany
Olympic Games
Gold medal – first place	2006 Turin	Four-man
World Championships
Gold medal – first place	2000 Altenberg	Four-man
Gold medal – first place	2003 Lake Placid	Four-man
Gold medal – first place	2004 Königssee	Four-man
Gold medal – first place	2005 Calgary	Four-man
Gold medal – first place	2008 Altenberg	Four-man
Silver medal – second place	2000 Altenberg	Two-man
Silver medal – second place	2001 St. Moritz	Four-man
Bronze medal – third place	2007 St. Moritz	Four-man

René Hoppe (born 9 December 1976 in Oelsnitz, Saxony) is a German bobsledder who has competed since 1998. At the 2006 Winter Olympics in Turin, he won a gold medal in the four-man event with teammates Kevin Kuske, André Lange, and Martin Putze.

Hoppe also won eight medals at the FIBT World Championships with five golds (Four-man: 2000, 2003, 2004, 2005, 2008), two silvers (Two-man: 2000, Four-man: 2001), and one bronze (Four-man: 2007).
