= Doug Sharp =

American bobsledder (born 1969)

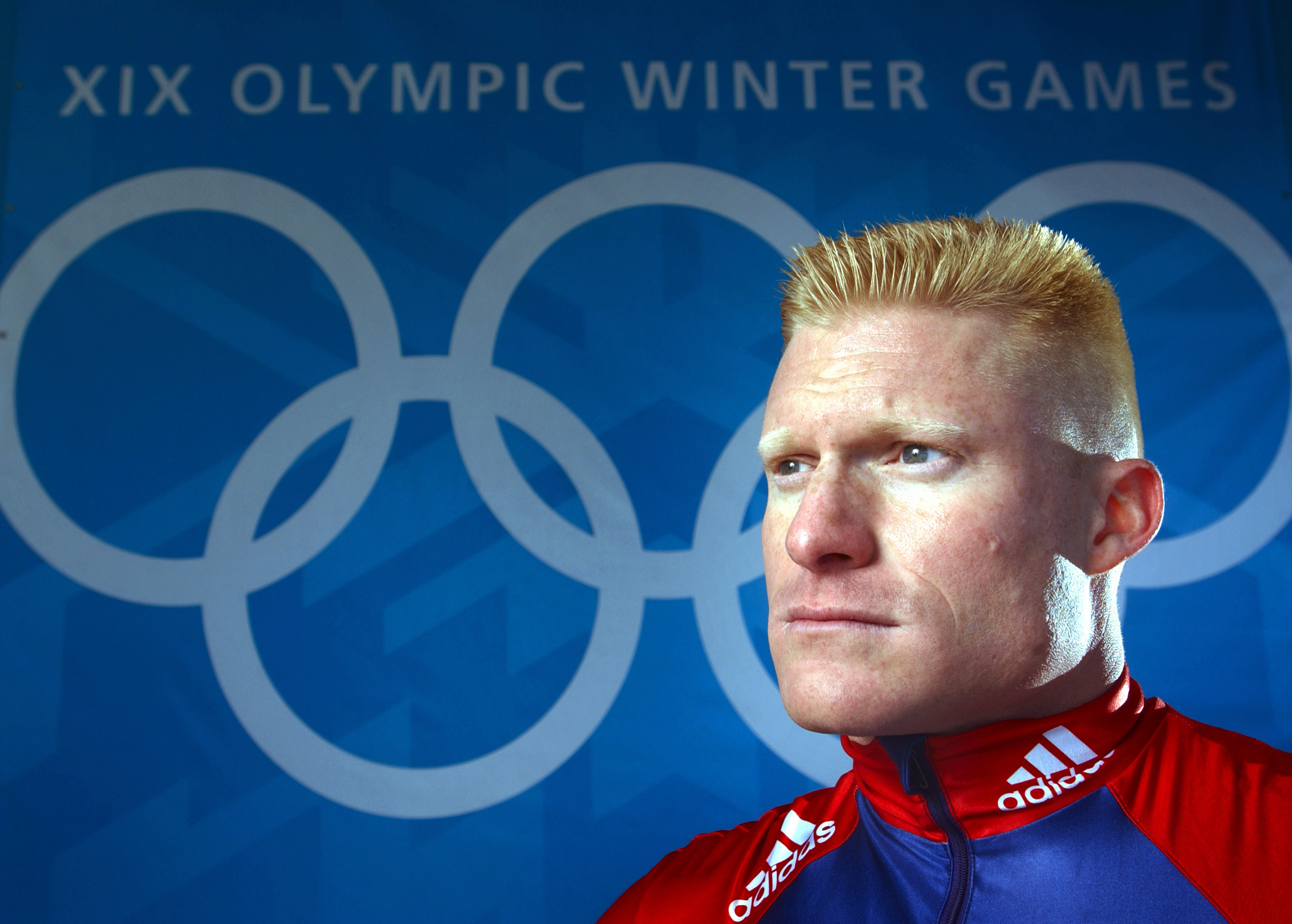
- Sharp in February 2002

Personal information
- Born: November 27, 1969 (age 56) Marion, Ohio, U.S.
Medal record
Men's bobsleigh
Representing the United States
Olympic Games
Bronze medal – third place	2002 Salt Lake City	Four-man

Doug Sharp (born November 27, 1969, in Marion, Ohio) is an American bobsledder who competed from the late 1990s to the early 2000s. He won the bronze medal in the four-man event at the 2002 Winter Olympics in Salt Lake City.

Prior to his involvement in bobsleigh, Sharp was also involved in track and field in the pole vault, barely missing the cut-off qualification for the United States Olympic trials for the 1996 Summer Olympics in Atlanta. He also played American football and ice hockey, in football, where he was a Strong Safety, he received 21 college football offers to play for schools such as Kansas, Eastern Michigan, Ohio, and Division II Ferris State, but he rejected all of them to focus on track at Purdue. At the time of the 2002 games, he also served as an assistant athletics coach for the University of Louisville in Kentucky.

Sharp also is a licensed chiropractor and serves in the United States Army in artillery. He graduated from Purdue University in 1993.

In 2008, Sharp married Carrie Weil, an Emmy Award-winning journalist and morning news anchor for WAVE TV3 in Louisville at the time. In 2010, the couple decided to head north from Kentucky, and they resided in Bay City, Michigan. After a one-year stint of teaching as a 7th grade science teacher and coaching for Gladeville Middle School as an assistant football coach, he moved to Donelson Christian Academy for an assistant coaching job along with his son Watt Sharp. At the school, he decided to teach non-faculty, noting his own experience teaching at Gladeville Middle School and seeing how chaotic it was teaching 7th grade. Carrie Sharp is currently an evening news anchor for WTVF-TV in Nashville, Tennessee. He has two sons and he also has a niece named Shelby.
