= Chen Chien-sheng =

Taiwanese bobsledder

Personal information
- Nationality: Taiwanese
- Born: 20 December 1976 (age 48)

Sport
- Sport: Bobsleigh

Chen Chien-sheng (born 20 December 1976) is a Taiwanese bobsledder. He competed in the four man event at the 2002 Winter Olympics.
