= Vonetta Flowers =

American bobsledder

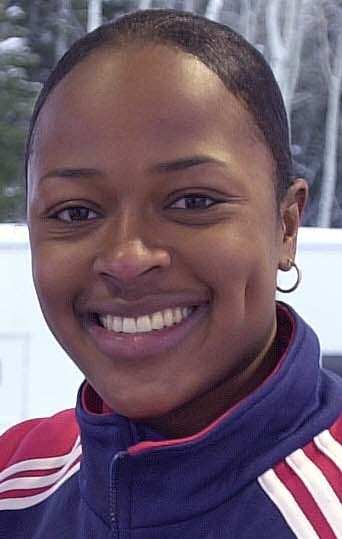
- Vonetta Flowers

Personal information
- Nationality: American
- Born: October 29, 1973 (age 52) Birmingham, Alabama
- Education: University of Alabama at Birmingham (UAB)
- Spouse: Johnny Flowers
Medal record
Bobsleigh
Representing the United States
Olympic Games
Gold medal – first place	2002 Salt Lake City	Two-woman
World Championships
Bronze medal – third place	2004 Königssee	Two-woman

Vonetta Flowers (née Jeffery; born October 29, 1973) is an American bobsledder. At the 2002 Winter Olympics, Flowers became the first African American and the first Black athlete from any country to win a gold medal at a Winter Olympics.

== Career ==
Flowers was a star sprinter and long jumper at the University of Alabama at Birmingham, and originally aspired to make the Summer Olympics. After several failed attempts, Flowers turned to bobsledding, and found success as a brakewoman almost immediately. At the 2002 Winter Olympics, she, along with driver Jill Bakken, won the gold medal in the two-woman event, becoming the first Black athlete of any nationality to win a gold medal in the Winter Olympics. After the Salt Lake City Games, Flowers gave birth to twins and took some time off from the sport. In 2003, she returned to competition with new driver Jean Prahm. Flowers and Prahm competed in the 2006 Winter Olympics in Turin, finishing sixth.

Flowers also won the bronze medal in the two-woman event at the 2004 FIBT World Championships in Königssee. She retired from competition after the 2006 Winter Olympics.

In December 2010, she was elected to the Alabama Sports Hall of Fame. She was inducted as a member of the Class of 2011 in May.

Since retiring from competition in 2006, Flowers has been living in Jacksonville, Florida with her husband, Johnny, and her three sons.
