= Jill Bakken =

American bobsledder (born 1977)

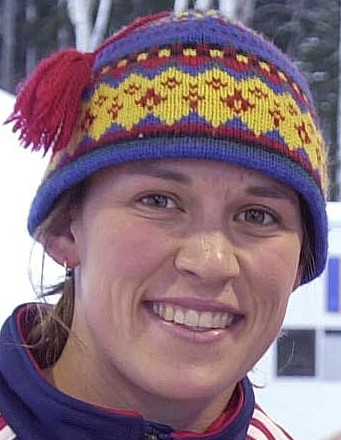
- Bakken in 2002

Personal information
- Nationality: American
- Born: January 25, 1977 (age 49) Portland, Oregon
- Height: 5 ft 6 in (1.67 m)
- Weight: 143 lb (65 kg)

Sport
- Country: United States
- Sport: Bobsleigh
- Event: Two-woman
Medal record
Women's bobsleigh
Representing the United States
Winter Games
Gold medal – first place	2002 Salt Lake City	Two-woman
Association football career
- Position: Defender
College career
Years	Team	Apps	(Gls)
1996	Oregon State Beavers	16	(0)

Jill Bakken (born January 25, 1977) is an American Olympic bobsledder who has competed since 1994. As the driver, she and partner Vonetta Flowers won the gold medal in Bobsleigh at the 2002 Winter Olympics for the U.S. Bakken's best Bobsleigh World Cup season finish was second in the two-woman event in 1999–2000. Bakken was a Specialist in the Utah Army National Guard and sponsored by the Army World Class Athlete Program at the time she won gold.

Bakken is a graduate of Lake Washington High School and an alumna of Eastern Washington University, transferring there in 2005. She has also attended the University of Utah and Oregon State University, playing one season of soccer as a defender at the latter.

Bakken is now a driving coach for the Canadian bobsleigh team and is married to Florian Linder who is also a coach for the Canadian bobsled team.
