= Silvio Schaufelberger =

Swiss bobsledder (born 1977)

Medal record

Bobsleigh

World Championships
Silver medal – second place	1999 Cortina d'Ampezzo	Four-man

Silvio Schaufelberger (born 21 March 1977) is a Swiss bobsledder who has competed from the late 1990s to the early 2000s. He won a silver medal in the four-man event at the 1999 FIBT World Championships.

Schaufelberger also finished fourth in the four-man event at the 2002 Winter Olympics in Salt Lake City.
