= Todd Hays =

American bobsledder (born 1969)

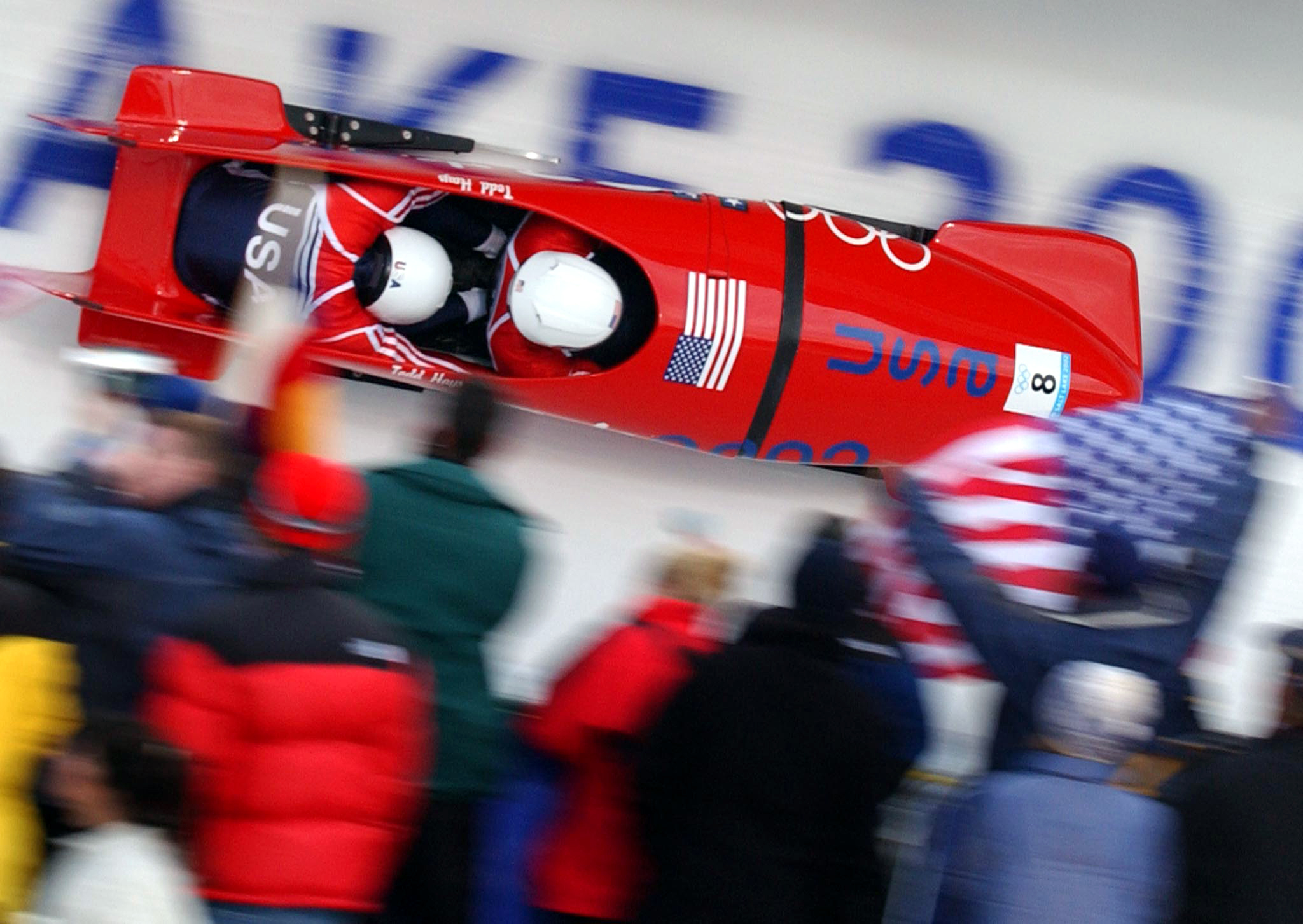

Personal information
- Full name: Todd Dennys Hays
- Born: May 21, 1969 (age 57)
Medal record
Men's bobsleigh
Representing the United States
Olympic Games
Silver medal – second place	2002 Salt Lake City	Four-man
World Championships
Silver medal – second place	2003 Lake Placid	Four-man
Bronze medal – third place	2004 Königssee	Four-man
World Cup
Bronze medal – third place	2003-04	Combined
Bronze medal – third place	2003-04	Four-man
Bronze medal – third place	2005-06	Combined
Bronze medal – third place	2005-06	Two-man

Todd Dennys Hays (born May 21, 1969) is a former American bobsledder who competed from 1994 to 2006. Competing in two Winter Olympics, he won the silver medal in the four-man event at Salt Lake City in 2002, breaking a 46-year medal drought for the US national bobsleigh team.

He also won two medals in the four-man event at the FIBT World Championships with a silver in 2003 and a bronze in 2004. He finished third four times in the Bobsleigh World Cup, earning them twice in combined men's (2003-4, 2005-6) and once each in the two-man (2005–06) and four-man events (2003–04).

Hays was raised in Del Rio, Texas. Prior to his bobsleigh career, Hays also was involved in American football and kickboxing. This included playing linebacker for the University of Tulsa in Oklahoma for which he was part of the team that defeated San Diego State University in the Freedom Bowl in 1991. He also is a member of the Pi Kappa Alpha fraternity. Hays played two seasons with the Toronto Argonauts of the Canadian Football League before switching to kickboxing where he became national champion in 1993.

He competed in the 1995 Vale Tudo Freestyle Fighting Championship in Japan. Winning his first bout against Koichiro Kimura via submission, Hays was set to face Rickson Gracie in his second fight of the tournament. However, he had sustained an injury to his shoulder which caused him to decide to leave the tournament. Todd is featured in the film Choke: Rickson Gracie, a documentary of the Brazilian fighter's preparation for the 1995 Vale Tudo tournament. In it, he explains how he had chosen to enter the tournament in Japan and fight under this rule set to make money, as he wanted to be able to finance his true dream; to compete in the Olympics as a bobsledder.

Hays retired from bobsleigh after the 2006 Winter Olympics in Turin and returned to coaching football in the United States. In 2008, Hays attempted a comeback in preparation for the 2010 Winter Olympics in Vancouver. On December 9, 2009, Hays sustained an injury during practice at the bobsleigh, luge, and skeleton track in Winterberg, Germany. Medical personnel for the US Bobsleigh Team evaluated Hays' condition in Lake Placid, New York, and stated Hays suffered from an intraparenchymal hematoma which was originally suspected to be a concussion. The doctors in turn forced Hays into retirement to avoid any further brain damage.

Subsequently, Hays became a bobsleigh coach, working with Mike Kohn weeks after returning from Winterberg to help him clinch the third slot for the US national team at the 2010 Winter Olympics. He worked with the Dutch bobsleigh team in the 2010-11 season, coaching Esmé Kamphuis to a second place at a World Cup event at Cesana Pariol, the first medal ever won by a Dutch bobsleigh crew. Subsequently, the United States Bobsled and Skeleton Federation announced in May 2011 that Hays would take up the position of head coach for the US women's team from July of that year. Despite leading the women's team to two medals at the 2014 Winter Olympics, it was announced in May 2014 that Hayes had lost his job after changes to USBSF's coaching structure resulting in the men's and women's head coach positions being merged. After leaving the US team Hays became head coach and technical director for the Jamaican bobsled team for the 2014–15 season. However he had to leave this role after one season due to a lack of funds to pay his salary, although he continued to work with the team in an unofficial capacity.
