= Lin Ruei-ming =

Taiwanese bobsledder

Personal information
- Nationality: Taiwanese
- Born: 2 October 1981 (age 43)

Sport
- Sport: Bobsleigh

Lin Ruei-ming (Chinese: 林瑞明; born 2 October 1981) is a Taiwanese bobsledder. He competed in the four man event at the 2002 Winter Olympics.
