= Enrico Kühn =

German bobsledder (born 1977)

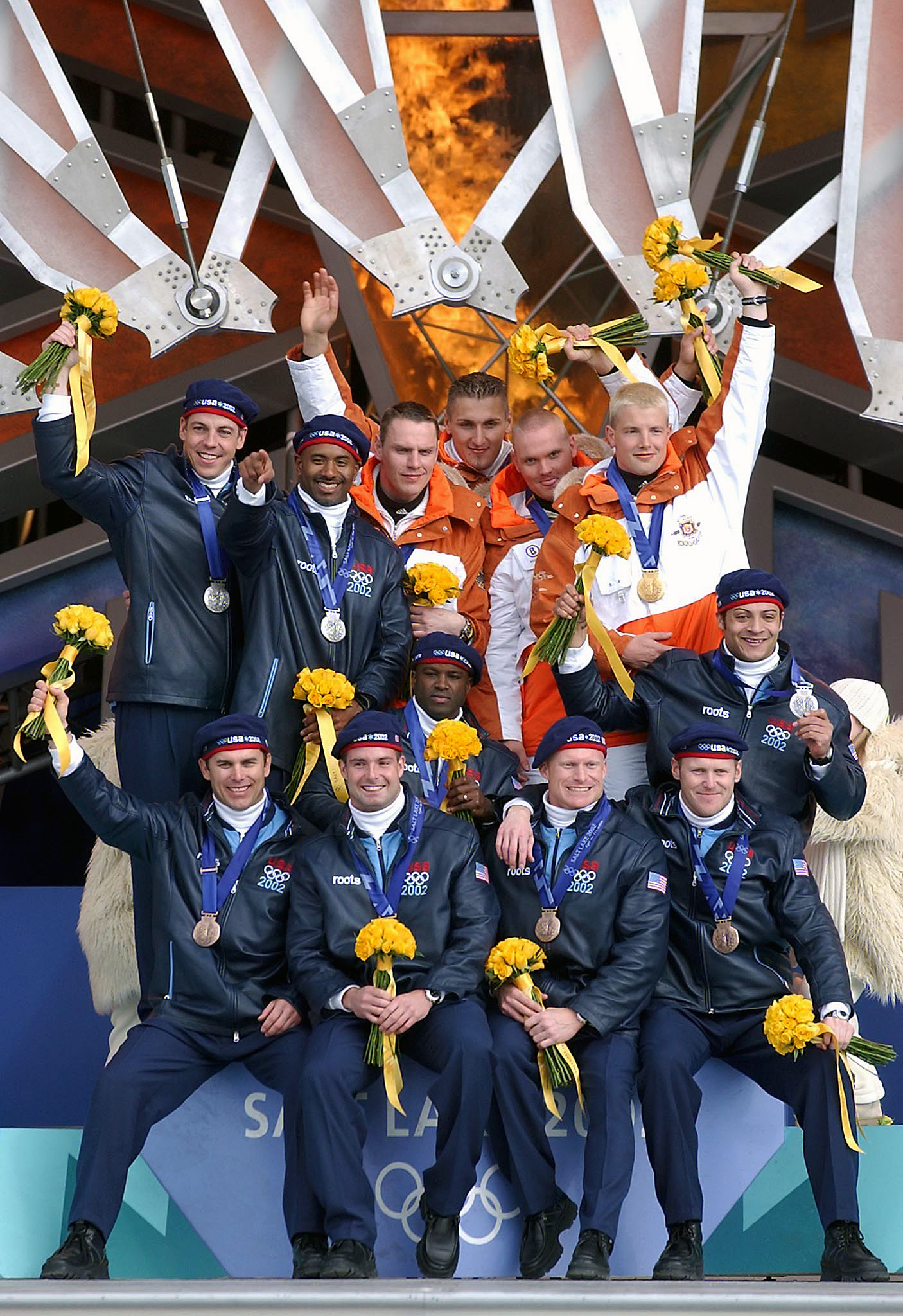

Personal information
- Nationality: German
- Born: 10 March 1977 (age 49) Bad Langensalza, Thuringia, East Germany
- Height: 1.93 m (6 ft 4 in)
- Weight: 102 kg (225 lb)

Sport
- Country: Germany
- Sport: Bobsleigh
- Event: 4-man

Achievements and titles
- Personal best: 1st place, gold medalist(s)
Medal record
Men's Bobsleigh
Representing Germany
Olympic Games
Gold medal – first place	2002 Salt Lake City	Four-man
World Championships
Silver medal – second place	2004 Königssee	Four-man

Enrico Kühn (born 10 March 1977 in Bad Langensalza) is a German bobsledder who has competed since 1995. At the 2002 Winter Olympics in Salt Lake City, he won a gold medal in the four-man event with teammates Kevin Kuske, André Lange and Carsten Embach.

Kühn also won a silver medal in the four-man event at the 2004 FIBT World Championships in Königssee.
