= Aleksandar Bundalo =

Serbian bobsledder and politician (born 1989)

Personal information
- Born: 28 September 1989 (age 36) Sremska Mitrovica, SR Serbia, SFR Yugoslavia
- Height: 2.05 m (6 ft 9 in)
- Weight: 109 kg (240 lb)

Sport
- Country: Serbia
- Sport: Bobsleigh, Athletics

Aleksandar Bundalo (born 28 September 1989) is a bobsledder and politician from Serbia. He competed for Serbia at the 2014 Winter Olympics in the two man event with Vuk Rađenović. Bundalo is also a track and field athlete, and has been a national champion in the long jump and triple jump.

== Personal bests (outdoor) ==
Event	Performance	Location	Date
100 metres	11.25	Senta	14 May 2011
Long jump	7.66	Sremska Mitrovica	16 May 2013
Triple jump	15.19	Kragujevac	9 September 2007

== Politician ==
Bundalo is a member of the Serbian Progressive Party. He was appointed to the municipal council of Ruma on 10 June 2016 with responsibility for sports and served in this role for the four years.

He was given the twelfth position on the Progressive Party's Aleksandar Vučić — For Our Children electoral list in the 2020 Vojvodina provincial election and was elected when the list won a majority victory with seventy-six out of 120 mandates. He is now a member of the assembly committee on agriculture and the committee on youth and sports.
