= Sergey Golubev =

Russian bobsledder (born 1978)

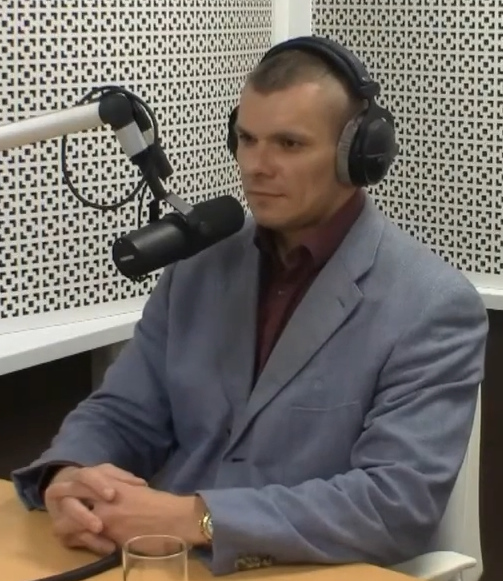
- Golubev in 2014

Personal information
- Born: 28 January 1978 (age 48)
Medal record
Bobsleigh
Representing Russia
World Championships
| Silver medal – second place | 2005 Calgary | Four-man |
| Bronze medal – third place | 2003 Lake Placid | Four-man |

Sergey Viktorovich Golubev (Russian: Серге́й Викторович Голубев; born 28 January 1978) is a retired Russian bobsledder who competed from 2000 to 2006. He won two medals in the four-man event at the FIBT World Championships with a silver in 2005 and a bronze in 2003.

Golubev also finished ninth in the four-man event at the 2006 Winter Olympics in Turin. Shortly after the Olympics Golubev suffered a car accident in which he sustained injuries which forced him to retire from competition.
