= Niki Drpić =

Croatian bobsledder (born 1979)

Personal information
- Nationality: Croatian
- Born: 5 March 1979 (age 46); Split, Yugoslavia

Sport
- Sport: Bobsleigh

Niki Drpić (born 5 March 1979) is a Croatian bobsledder. He competed in the four man event at the 2002 Winter Olympics.
