= Li Chia-hsun =

Taiwanese luger (born 1976)

Personal information
- Nationality: Taiwanese
- Born: 5 July 1976 (age 48)

Sport
- Sport: Luge

Li Chia-hsun (born 5 July 1976) is a Taiwanese luger. He competed in the men's singles event at the 2002 Winter Olympics.
