= Milan Studnička =

Czech bobsledder

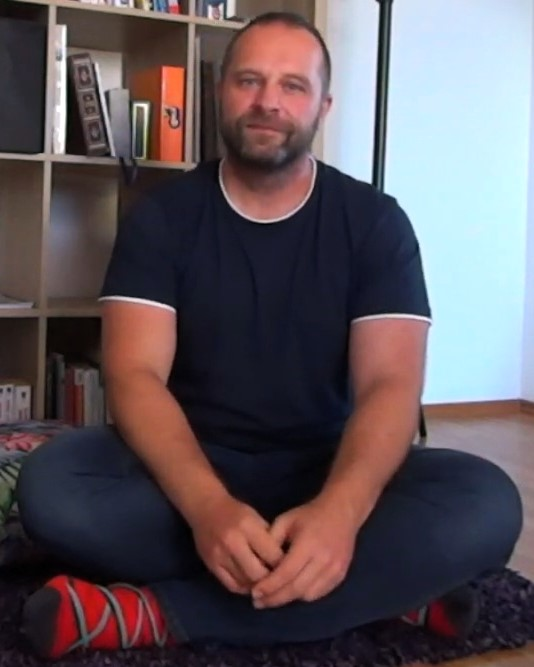
- Studnička in 2021

Personal information
- Nationality: Czech
- Born: 19 October 1977 (age 47); Most, Czechoslovakia

Sport
- Sport: Bobsleigh

Milan Studnička (born 19 October 1977) is a Czech bobsledder, psychologist, philosopher, and author.

He competed in the four man bobsleigh event at the 2002 Winter Olympics.

He is also a writer of psychological and philosophical books and articles. He co-authored the book Muži jsou ze Země a ženy taktéž (lit. 'Men Are From Earth, So Are Women') in 2003 and wrote Každý lhář je vždy zlodějem a jen pravda jasně ví, co bude dál (lit. 'Every Liar Is Always a Thief and Only the Truth Clearly Knows What Will Happen Next') in 2010. In 2019, he co-authored Každá bolest má svou příčinu (lit. 'Every Pain Has a Cause'), and in 2021 Pohodové rodičovství – Od miminka ke spokojenému puberťákovi (lit. 'Comfortable Parenting: From a Baby to Happy Teenager').
