= Chen Chien-li =

Taiwanese bobsledder

Personal information
- Nationality: Taiwanese
- Born: 29 September 1980 (age 44)

Sport
- Sport: Bobsleigh

Chen "Steve" Chien-li (born 29 September 1980) is a Taiwanese bobsledder. He competed in the four-man event at the 2002 Winter Olympics.
