= Rachel Gilmore =

Independent Canadian journalist

- Education: Carleton University (2012-2016)
- Occupation: Journalist

Instagram information
- Page: r.gilmore
- Followers: 169,000

TikTok information
- Page: rachel_gilmore
- Followers: 190,000
- Last updated: May 9, 2026
- Website: rachelgilmore.substack.com

Rachel Gilmore is a Canadian independent journalist based out of Montreal. She specializes in journalism covering federal politics, disinformation, and the far-right.

== Career ==
In 2022, Gilmore faced attacks from Conservative Party of Canada leader Pierre Poilievre for her journalism at Global News. In response to the harassment she received, she helped draft an open letter to Justin Trudeau that was signed by 48 Canadian media organizations in opposition to the harassment of journalists. For this, she was awarded the Tara Singh Hayer Memorial Award by Canadian Journalists for Free Expression. She was laid off from Global News in 2023 as part of broader layoffs at the organization.

Gilmore then pivoted her work to independent journalism through her outlet Bubble Pop Media. Her investigations, which generally take the form of short-form videos, have focused notably on the far-right, and in particular active clubs. She reported on an instance where members of the Frontenac Active Club in Montreal managed to use a gym without the owner's knowledge. In March 2026, two members of said active club, Shawn Beauvais-Macdonald and Giulio Zardo, showed up at an event to intimidate her due to her investigation.

In March 2025, CTV hired Gilmore to host a weekly fact-checking segment for the 2025 Canadian federal election. She would be fired shortly after a conservative pressure campaign made her segment a "distraction" for the channel. Gilmore is associated with feminist reporting. She has repeatedly spoken up in defense of women's rights, in particular denouncing embarrassment and misogyny targeting female journalists. In December 2025, she was invited to testify in front of the House of Commons of Canada's Standing Committee on the Status of Women on the effects of anti-feminist ideology. Gilmore is regularly targeted by Internet harassment campaigns by far-right groups.
