= Alexandre Arbez =

French bobsledder

Personal information
- Nationality: French
- Born: 5 July 1978 (age 48) Annecy, France
- Height: 1.89 m (6 ft 2 in)
- Weight: 88 kg (194 lb)

Sport
- Sport: Bobsleigh

Alexandre Arbez (born 5 July 1978) is a French bobsledder. He competed in the four man event at the 2002 Winter Olympics.
