= Michel André (bobsleigh) =

French bobsledder

Personal information
- Nationality: French
- Born: 2 September 1970 (age 54); Paris, France

Sport
- Sport: Bobsleigh

Michel André (born 2 September 1970) is a French bobsledder. He competed in the four man event at the 2002 Winter Olympics.
