= Franz Sagmeister =

German bobsledder (born 1974)

Personal information
- Born: 21 October 1974 (age 51)
- Height: 6 ft 4 in (1.93 m)
Medal record
Men's Bobsleigh
Representing Germany
World Championships
Bronze medal – third place	2003 Lake Placid	Two-man

Franz Sagmeister (born 21 October 1974) is a German bobsledder who competed from 1997 to 2005. He won a bronze medal in the two-man event at the 2003 FIBT World Championships in Lake Placid, New York.

Competing in two Winter Olympics, Sagmeister earned his best finish of sixth in the two-man event at Salt Lake City in 2002.

Sagmeister retired at the end of 2005, but attempted to come back with the German national team for the 2007-08 season with René Spies without success.
