= Chen Chin-san =

Taiwanese bobsledder

Personal information
- Nationality: Taiwanese
- Born: 18 January 1959 (age 66); Hualien, Taiwan

Sport
- Sport: Bobsleigh

Chen Chin-san (Chinese: 陳金勝; born 18 January 1959) is a Taiwanese bobsledder. He competed at the 1984, 1988, 1992 and the 2002 Winter Olympics.
