= Giulio Zardo =

Canadian bobsledder (born 1980)

Personal information
- Born: July 14, 1980 (age 45) Montreal, Quebec, Canada
- Occupation(s): Football player, bobsledder
- Years active: 1999–2005
- Height: 190 cm (6 ft 3 in)
Medal record
Bobsleigh
World Championships
Gold medal – first place	2004 Königssee	Two-man
Silver medal – second place	2003 Lake Placid	Two-man

Giulio Zardo (born July 14, 1980) is a Canadian athlete. He was a linebacker in the Canadian Junior Football League, before joining the Canadian National Bobsled team in 2001 as a brakeman. He won a silver medal in the two-man event at the FIBT World Championships in 2003 and gold in the same event in 2004. At the 2002 Winter Olympics in Salt Lake City, Zardo finished fifth in the two-man event with Pierre Lueders and ninth in the four-man event.

== Early life ==
Giulio Zardo was born on July 14, 1980 in Montreal, Quebec. His father was a police officer. Both of his parents are of Italian descent, with his maternal grandparents having immigrated to Canada from Campobasso in the early 20th century. He has two siblings.

== Career ==
=== Canadian Junior Football League ===
Zardo started out as an athlete playing football in the Canadian Junior Football League with the St-Leonard Cougars. He played as a linebacker. Zardo then joined the Champlain Cougars team at Champlain Regional College which he played for in 1999 and 2000.

Zardo graduated from Champlain Regional College in late 2000 and went on to attend Concordia University with a scholarship, studying leisure sciences. He was named the CEGEP AAA Defensive Player of the Year in 2000. He aimed to become a professional football player, but this fell through; he was selected twice to play for American college football teams (the University of Colorado and the University of New Hampshire), but both times it fell through due to academic issues.

=== Bobsledding ===
He pivoted from football to bobsledding in August 2001 when bobsledder Yannick Morin was suggested him as a possible player for the Canadian National Bobsled team. He had no previous experience with the sport. He teamed with Morin as his breakman, before replacing pilot bobsledder Pierre Lueders's brakeman, Hugo Lebire, after he was injured. He was the union representative to the Canadian bobsledding federation.

At the 2002 Winter Olympics in Salt Lake City, Zardo finished fifth in the two-man event with Lueders and ninth in the four-man event. In the Bobsleigh World Cup, together they finished second in standings for the 2003–2004 season. Zardo and Lueders won silver in the two-man event of the FIBT World Championships in 2003. The pair won gold in the World Championships in the two-man event in 2004.

Following an abdominal injury, Zardo was taken off the team for a brief time. He was replaced by Lascelles Brown. He claimed that his coach, Gerd Gemme, forced him to keep training despite his injury. Zardo was suspended in December 2004 after getting into a physical altercation with his Grimme after he learned he was not chosen for the Olympic team. He was allowed to return to the team under certain conditions after complaints from the other athletes.

In early 2005, he was asked to submit to a doping test, which he submitted to, admitting to taking finasteride as prescribed by a doctor since 2000; finasteride had been recently prohibited by the sport, as it can mask the presence of steroids, though he had applied for a medical exemption prior to the test. Zardo quit the Canadian bobsledding team and the sport a few weeks later in April 2005, citing an inability to work with Lueders and a "toxic atmosphere". Following his announced retirement from the sport, the Canadian Centre for Ethics in Sport tried to test him again, which he refused. In August of that year, due to his refusal to submit to another drug test, he was banned from bobsledding for two years.

=== Later career ===
After leaving bobsledding, Zardo attempted to return to football as a prospective player for the Edmonton Eskimos, this time as a defensive lineman. Less than three days after training camp started, he quit, for personal reasons. He told the newspaper La Presse in September 2005 that: "For me, sports are over. I'm no longer interested." In 2009, he planned to represent Italy in the 2010 Winter Olympics, and earned a spot on their bobsledding team.

As of 2026, he was a boxing coach at the Alpha Athletika gym in Saint Leonard, Quebec. In March 2026, after Zardo was alleged by local outlet The Tyee to have trained members of the Frontenac Active Club, he lost his job there. Following the Tyee exposé, he attempted to publicly intimidate the journalist that wrote it, Rachel Gilmore.
