= Rašo Vučinić =

Serbian bobsledder and politician

- Рашо Вучинић
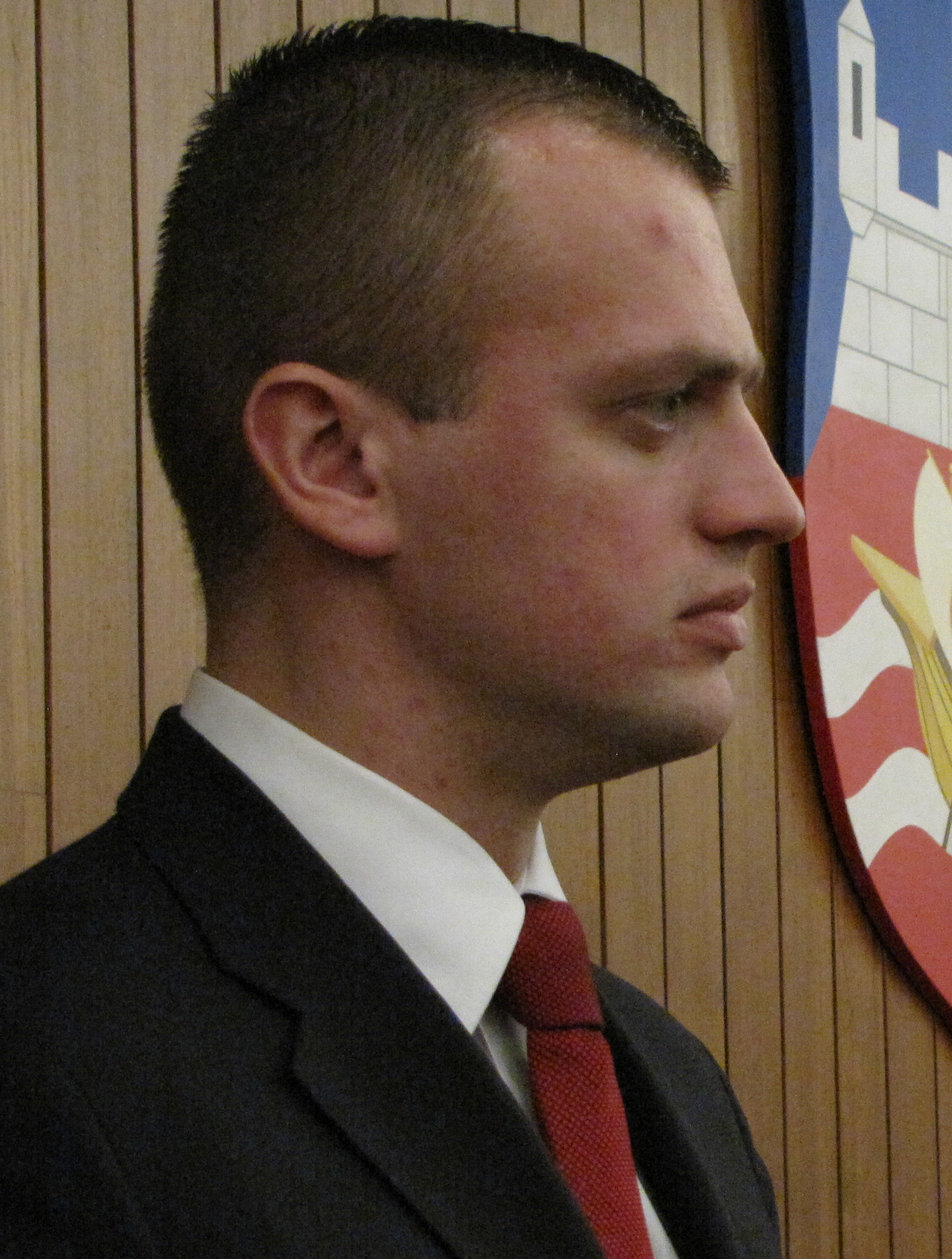
- Vučinić in the City Assembly of Belgrade, 2011

Member of the City Assembly of Belgrade
- In office 2008–2012

Personal details
- Born: 1 September 1982 (age 43) Zenica, Bosnia and Herzegovina, Yugoslavia
- Party: Serbian Radical Party (until 2010)
- Other political affiliations: Montenegrin-Herzegovinian Movement
- Education: University of Belgrade
- Occupation: Politician, bobsledder

Rašo Vučinić (Serbian Cyrillic: Рашо Вучинић; born 1 September 1982) is a Serbian former bobsledder and politician. He competed in the four man event at the 2002 Winter Olympics, representing the Federal Republic of Yugoslavia.

== Life ==
Rašo Vučinić was born to a Montenegrin Serb family in Zenica which at that time was a part of SR Bosnia and Herzegovina and SFR Yugoslavia. His family hails from Mojkovac. He graduated from the Faculty of Sport and Physical Education at the University of Belgrade.

He competed in the four man event in bobsleigh at the 2002 Winter Olympics, representing the Federal Republic of Yugoslavia.

Vučinić was a member of the far-right Serbian Radical Party (SRS) and served as the Member of the City Assembly of Belgrade when he was elected at the 2008 Belgrade City Assembly election. During his time with the Radicals, he claimed to have played gusle together with a convicted war-criminal Radovan Karadžić while he was a fugitive and even claimed that he would have offered him a shelter if he had known it was Karadžić. He was arrested during the protests against Karadžić's arrest in 2008. Vučinić received 165th position on SRS's electoral list for the 2008 Serbian parliamentary election, failing to get elected. He left SRS in 2010.

Vučinić is the President of the Institute for Gusle and Epic Poetry of Serbia as well as the founder and current President of the political organization called Montenegrin-Herzegovinian Movement which was founded to contribute to better relations between Serbia and Montenegro.
