= Dalibor Ðurđić =

Serbian bobsledder (born 1975)

Personal information
- Nationality: Serbian
- Born: 7 June 1975 (age 49); Belgrade, Yugoslavia

Sport
- Sport: Bobsleigh

Dalibor Ðurđić (born 7 June 1975) is a Serbian bobsledder. He competed in the four man event at the 2002 Winter Olympics, representing Yugoslavia.
