= Bjarne Røyland =

Norwegian bobsledder (born 1971)

Personal information
- Born: 26 January 1971 (age 55) Mandal, Norway

Sport
- Sport: Bobsleigh

Bjarne Røyland (born 26 January 1971) is a Norwegian bobsledder, born in Mandal, Norway.

He competed at the 2002 Winter Olympics in Salt Lake City, where he placed 20th in men's two, together with Arnfinn Kristiansen, and also participated in men's four.
