= Lin Chui-bin =

Taiwanese luger (born 1977)

Personal information
- Nationality: Taiwanese
- Born: 2 December 1977 (age 47)

Sport
- Sport: Luge

Lin Chui-bin (Chinese: 林垂賓; born 2 December 1977) is a Taiwanese luger. He competed in the men's singles event at the 2002 Winter Olympics.
