= Garrett Hines =

American bobsledder

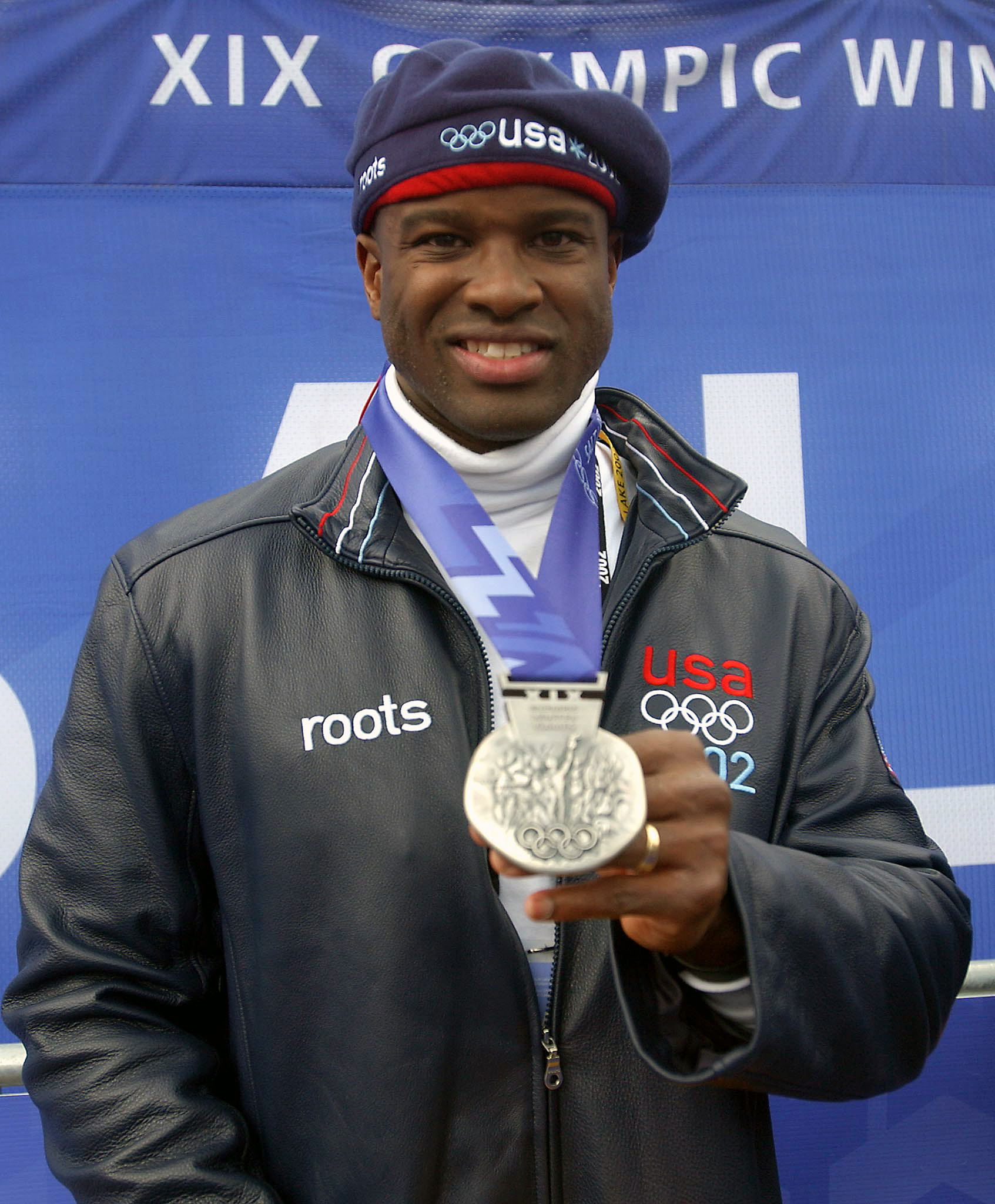
- Hines in February 2002
Medal record
Bobsleigh
Representing the United States
Olympic Games
Silver medal – second place	2002 Salt Lake City	Four-man
World Championships
Silver medal – second place	2003 Lake Placid	Four-man

Garrett Hines (born July 3, 1969) is an American bobsledder who has competed from the late 1990s to the early 2000s. Competing in two Winter Olympics, he won the silver medal in the four-man event at Salt Lake City in 2002.

Hines also won a silver medal in the four-man event at the 2003 FIBT World Championships in Lake Placid, New York.

Prior to his bobsleigh career, Hines also was involved in track and field as a decathlete. Additionally he played American football in high school. He attended Eisenhower High in Blue Island, Illinois for one year before moving to Tennessee, and going to Bartlett High School. Hines then went on to play two sports at Southern Illinois University.

He is a lieutenant colonel in the Virginia National Guard. He coached the bobsled team at the 2022 Winter Olympics.
