= Boris Rađenović =

Serbian bobsledder (born 1956)

Personal information
- Nationality: Bosnian
- Born: 9 August 1956 (age 69); Sisak, Yugoslavia

Sport
- Sport: Bobsleigh

Boris Rađenović (born 9 August 1956) is a Serbian bobsledder. He competed at the 1984 Winter Olympics and the 2002 Winter Olympics, representing Yugoslavia.
