= Brian Shimer =

American bobsledder

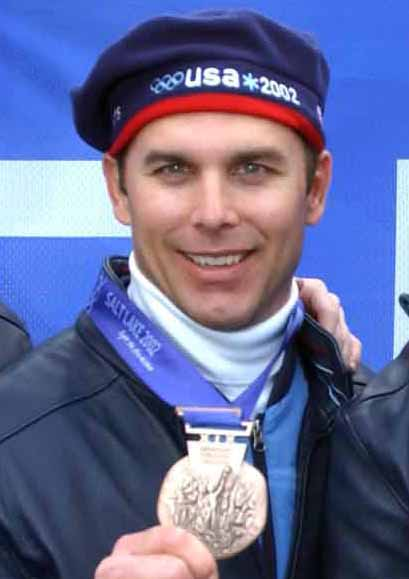
- Shimer with bronze medal in Salt Lake City

Personal information
- Born: April 20, 1962 (age 64)
Medal record
Men's bobsleigh
Representing the United States
Olympic Games
Bronze medal – third place	2002 Salt Lake City	Four-man
World Championships
Bronze medal – third place	1993 Igls	Four-man
Bronze medal – third place	1997 St. Moritz	Two-man
Bronze medal – third place	1997 St. Moritz	Four-man
World Cup Championships
Gold medal – first place	1992–93	Combined
Gold medal – first place	1992–93	Four-man
Silver medal – second place	1996–97	Two-man
Bronze medal – third place	1992–93	Two-man
Bronze medal – third place	1996–97	Two-man

Brian Shimer (born April 20, 1962) is an American bobsledder who competed from 1985 to 2002. Competing in five Winter Olympics, he won the bronze medal in the four-man event at Salt Lake City in 2002.

Shimer also won three bronze medals at the FIBT World Championships with one in the two-man event (1997) and two in the four-man event (1993, 1997).

He won the 1992–3 Bobsleigh World Cup championships both in the four-man and the combined men's events.

Shimer retired after the 2002 Winter Olympics and became head coach of the US men's bobsleigh team. After the United States Bobsled and Skeleton Federation changed its coaching structure in May 2014 Shimer became head coach for both the men's and women's teams.
