= Arnfinn Kristiansen =

Norwegian bobsledder

Personal information
- Born: 10 December 1971 (age 54) Oslo, Norway
- Height: 1.81 m (5 ft 11 in)
- Weight: 92 kg (203 lb)

Sport
- Country: Norway
- Sport: Bobsleigh
- Event: Two-man bobsleigh
- Club: Lillehammer Bob- og Akeklubb

Arnfinn Kristiansen (born 10 December 1971 in Oslo) is a Norwegian bobsledder.

He competed at the 1998 Winter Olympics in Nagano and at the 2002 Winter Olympics in Salt Lake City.
