= List of Olympic medalists in skeleton =

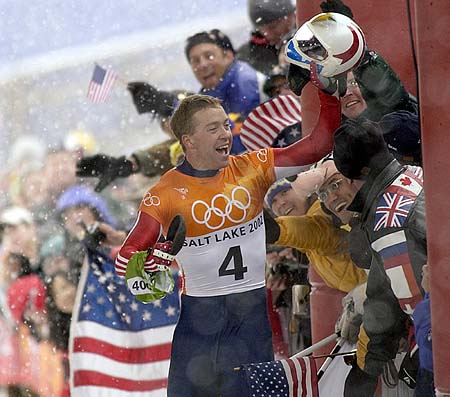
American Jimmy Shea won the 2002 Salt Lake City Olympics men's skeleton event, becoming the first Olympic skeleton champion since Nino Bibbia in the 1948 Games.

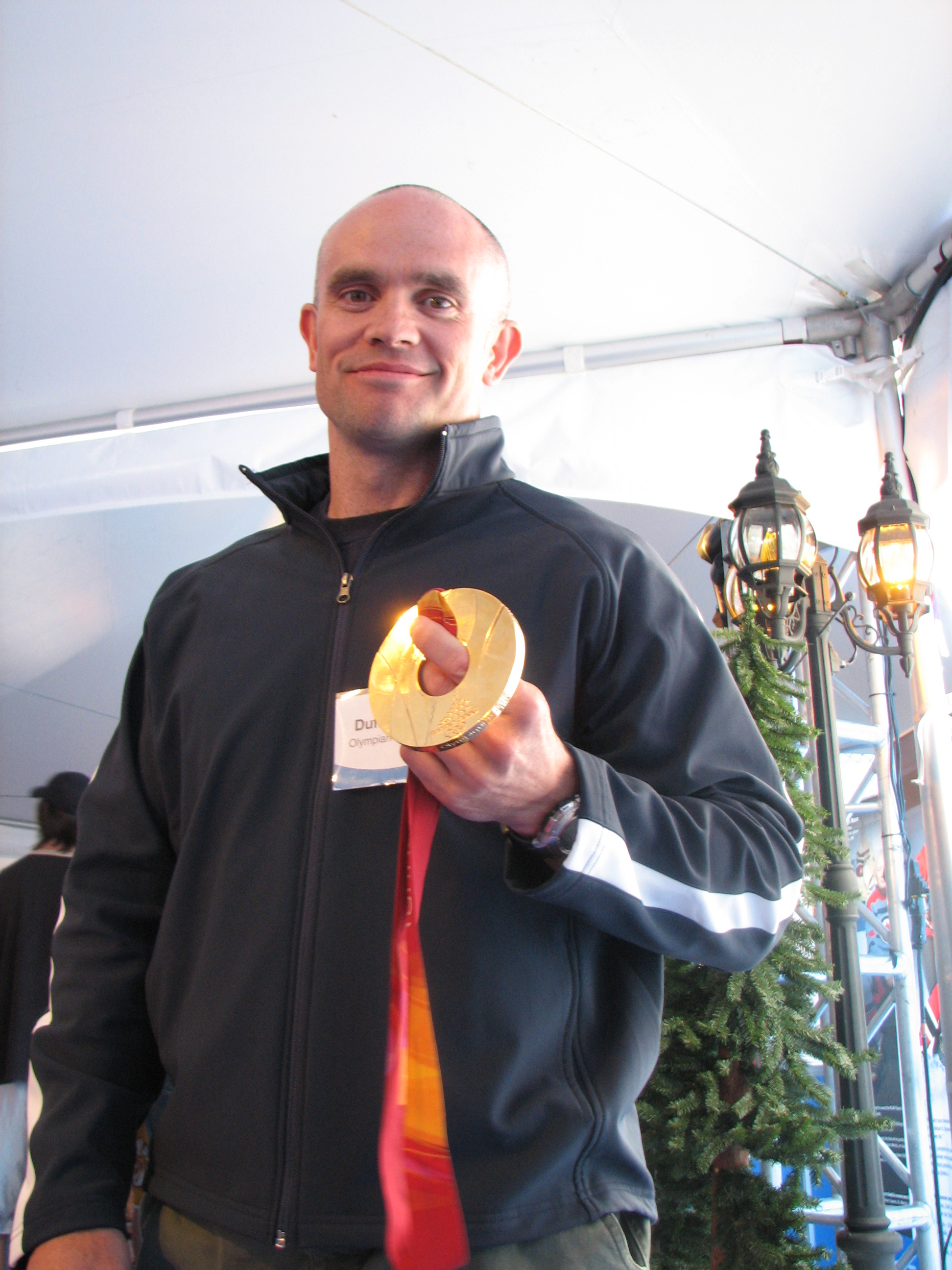
In 2006, Duff Gibson became the first Olympic skeleton champion from Canada and the oldest individual Winter Olympic gold medalist.

Skeleton is one of the Olympic sport disciplines contested at the Winter Olympic Games. It was introduced at the 1928 Winter Olympics in St. Moritz – the birthplace of skeleton – in the form of a men's event contested over four runs. Dropped from the 1932 and 1936 Winter Olympics program, skeleton returned in 1948, when St. Moritz hosted again the Winter Olympics, but was discarded from the following Games in Oslo. After 54 years of absence from the Olympic program, skeleton was reinstated as an official medal sport at the 2002 Winter Olympics in Salt Lake City, featuring individual events for men and women.

In 1928, the first Olympic skeleton event was won by American sledder Jennison Heaton, who also won a silver medal in the bobsleigh's five-man event. His younger brother, John Heaton, was runner-up, spending an additional second to complete all three runs (the fourth was cancelled). He repeated this result 20 years later, placing behind Nino Bibbia of Italy, who won his country's first Winter Olympic gold medal.

In 2002, American sledder Jimmy Shea – grandson of Jack Shea, two-time Olympic speed skating champion at the 1932 Lake Placid Games – secured the gold medal by 0.05 seconds, becoming the first Olympic skeleton champion in 54 years. On the same day, another American, Tristan Gale, won the first-ever women's event in the discipline. In the 2006 Winter Olympics men's event, 39-year-old Canadian Duff Gibson beat countryman and world champion Jeff Pain to become the oldest individual gold medalist at the Winter Games. Switzerland's Gregor Stähli won the bronze medal for the second time, beating the third Canadian sledder, Paul Boehm, by 0.26 seconds and thus preventing a medal sweep for Canada. Four years later, Jon Montgomery secured a back-to-back victory for Canada in the men's event, while Amy Williams's win in the women's event gave Great Britain its only medal at the 2010 Winter Olympics, as well as its first individual gold medalist since 1980, and first individual female gold medalist since 1952. This victory was emulated four years later in Sochi by another British athlete, Lizzy Yarnold, who secured her country's second consecutive Olympic skeleton gold medal. The following day, Aleksandr Tretyakov – who had won Russia's first Olympic skeleton medal in Vancouver – beat the 2010 Olympic silver medalist Martins Dukurs of Latvia in the men's event to secure his first Olympic title.

The most successful Olympic skeleton athletes are a pair of British competitors, Lizzie Yarnold and Matt Weston, the only competitors as of 2026 to win two gold medals. Yarnold is the only person to defend an Olympic skeleton title, while Weston became the first and to date only athlete to win two golds at a single Games, which has become possible following the inclusion of mixed relay. The most decorated competitors as of 2026 are a trio of Germans, Christopher Grotheer, Axel Jungk and Jacqueline Pfeifer, all of whom have won three Olympic medals. As of 2026, Great Britain is the most successful National Olympic Committee (NOC) in Olympic skeleton, having won five gold medals, one silver and five bronze, and has collected gold medals in all three Olympic disciplines (the men's, women's and mixed team events).

== Men ==
Games	Gold	Silver	Bronze
1928 St. Moritz	Jennison Heaton; United States	John Heaton; United States	David Carnegie; Great Britain
1932–1936	not included in the Olympic program		
1948 St. Moritz	Nino Bibbia; Italy	John Heaton; United States	John Crammond; Great Britain
1952–1998	not included in the Olympic program		
2002 Salt Lake City	Jimmy Shea; United States	Martin Rettl; Austria	Gregor Stähli; Switzerland
2006 Turin	Duff Gibson; Canada	Jeff Pain; Canada	Gregor Stähli; Switzerland
2010 Vancouver	Jon Montgomery; Canada	Martins Dukurs; Latvia	Aleksandr Tretyakov; Russia
2014 Sochi	Aleksandr Tretyakov; Russia	Martins Dukurs; Latvia	Matthew Antoine; United States
2018 Pyeongchang	Yun Sung-bin; South Korea	Nikita Tregubov; Olympic Athletes from Russia	Dominic Parsons; Great Britain
2022 Beijing	Christopher Grotheer; Germany	Axel Jungk; Germany	Yan Wengang; China
2026 Milan-Cortina	Matt Weston; Great Britain	Axel Jungk; Germany	Christopher Grotheer; Germany

Medals
Rank	Nation	Gold	Silver	Bronze	Total
1	United States	2	2	1	5
2	Canada	2	1	0	3
3	Germany	1	2	1	4
4	Great Britain	1	0	3	4
5	Russia	1	0	1	2
6	Italy	1	0	0	1
6	South Korea	1	0	0	1
8	Latvia	0	2	0	2
9	Austria	0	1	0	1
9	Olympic Athletes from Russia	0	1	0	1
11	Switzerland	0	0	2	2
12	China	0	0	1	1
Total	12 nations	9	9	9	27

== Women ==
Games	Gold	Silver	Bronze
2002 Salt Lake City	Tristan Gale; United States	Lea Ann Parsley; United States	Alex Coomber; Great Britain
2006 Turin	Maya Pedersen; Switzerland	Shelley Rudman; Great Britain	Mellisa Hollingsworth-Richards; Canada
2010 Vancouver	Amy Williams; Great Britain	Kerstin Szymkowiak; Germany	Anja Huber; Germany
2014 Sochi	Lizzy Yarnold; Great Britain	Noelle Pikus-Pace; United States	Elena Nikitina; Russia
2018 Pyeongchang	Lizzy Yarnold; Great Britain	Jacqueline Lölling; Germany	Laura Deas; Great Britain
2022 Beijing	Hannah Neise; Germany	Jaclyn Narracott; Australia	Kimberley Bos; Netherlands
2026 Milan-Cortina	Janine Flock; Austria	Susanne Kreher; Germany	Jacqueline Pfeifer; Germany

Medals
Rank	Nation	Gold	Silver	Bronze	Total
1	Great Britain	3	1	2	6
2	Germany	1	3	2	6
3	United States	1	2	0	3
4	Austria	1	0	0	1
4	Switzerland	1	0	0	1
6	Australia	0	1	0	1
7	Canada	0	0	1	1
7	Netherlands	0	0	1	1
7	Russia	0	0	1	1
Total	9 nations	7	7	7	21

== Mixed team ==
Games	Gold	Silver	Bronze
2026 Milan-Cortina	Tabitha Stoecker and Matt Weston (GBR)	Susanne Kreher and Axel Jungk (GER)	Jacqueline Pfeifer and Christopher Grotheer (GER)

Medals
Rank	Nation	Gold	Silver	Bronze	Total
1	Great Britain	1	0	0	1
2	Germany	0	1	1	2
Total	2 nations	1	1	1	3

== Overall medal table ==
Accurate as of 2026 Winter Olympics.

Rank	Nation	Gold	Silver	Bronze	Total
1	Great Britain	5	1	5	11
2	United States	3	4	1	8
3	Germany	2	6	4	12
4	Canada	2	1	1	4
5	Austria	1	1	0	2
6	Russia	1	0	2	3
6	Switzerland	1	0	2	3
8	Italy	1	0	0	1
8	South Korea	1	0	0	1
10	Latvia	0	2	0	2
11	Australia	0	1	0	1
11	Olympic Athletes from Russia	0	1	0	1
13	China	0	0	1	1
13	Netherlands	0	0	1	1
Totals (14 entries)		17	17	17	51

== Statistics ==
=== Multiple medalists ===
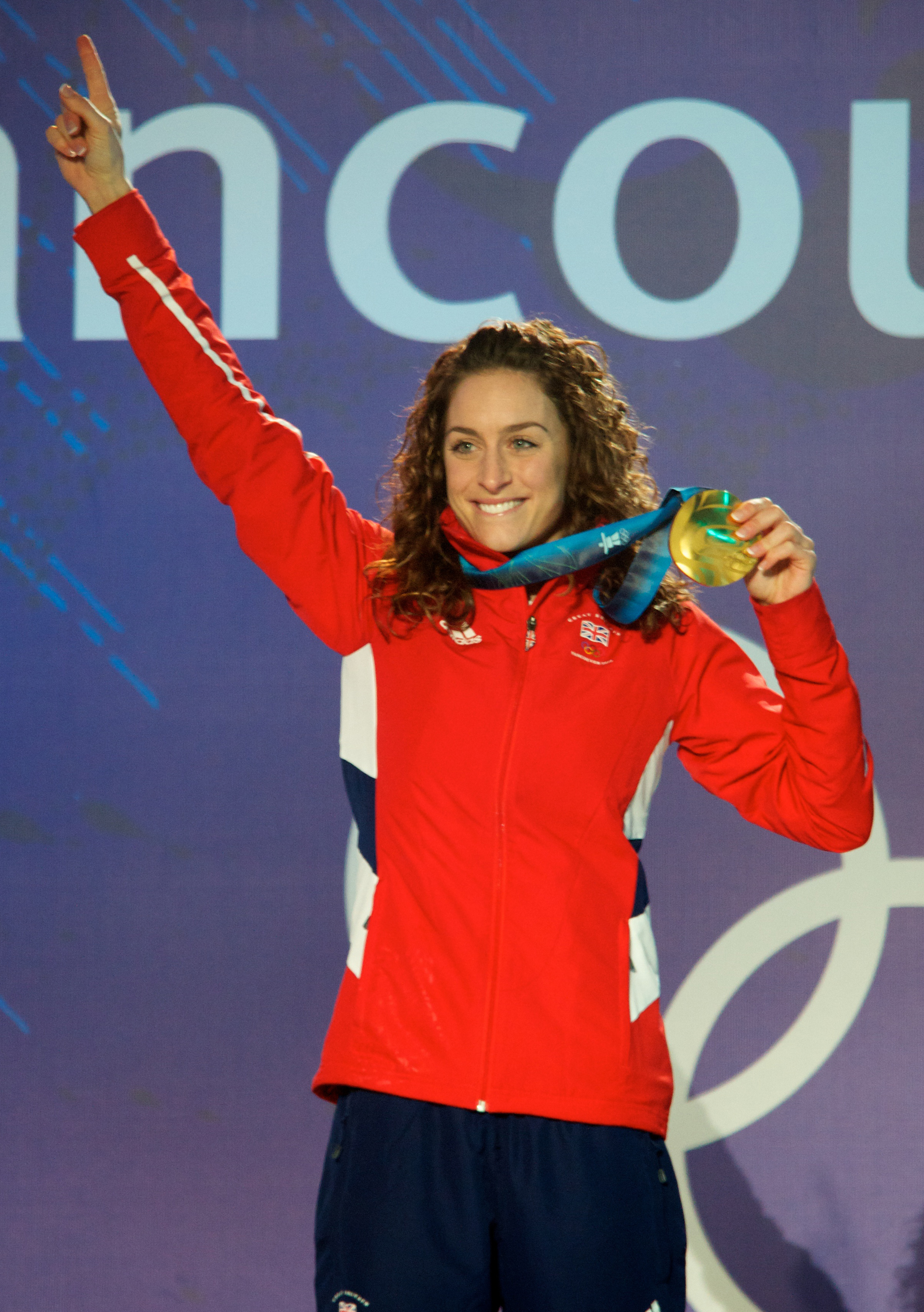
Amy Williams was the first British athlete since 1980 to win an individual event at the Winter Olympics, and the first British female athlete to do so since 1952.

Athlete	NOC	Olympics	Gold	Silver	Bronze	Total
Lizzy Yarnold	Great Britain	2014–2018	2	0	0	2
Matt Weston	Great Britain	2026	2	0	0	2
Christopher Grotheer	Germany	2022–2026	1	0	2	3
Aleksandr Tretyakov	Russia	2010–2014	1	0	1	2
Axel Jungk	Germany	2022–2026	0	3	0	3
John Heaton	United States	1928, 1948	0	2	0	2
Martins Dukurs	Latvia	2010–2014	0	2	0	2
Susanne Kreher	Germany	2026	0	2	0	2
Jacqueline Pfeifer	Germany	2018–2026	0	1	2	3
Gregor Stähli	Switzerland	2002–2006	0	0	2	2

=== Medals per year ===
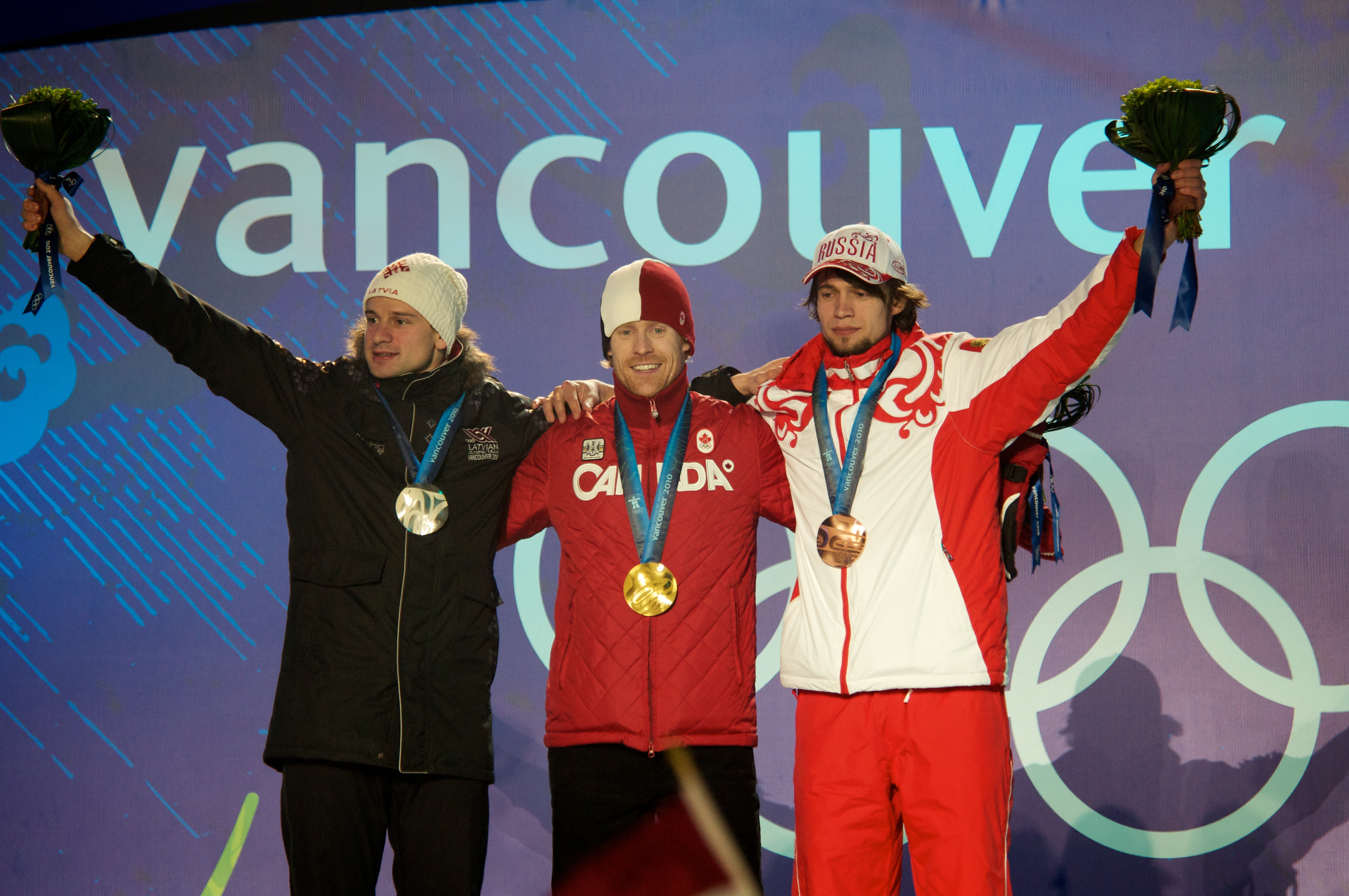
Jon Montgomery (center) celebrates a Canadian back-to-back Olympic title. Martins Dukurs of Latvia (left) and Aleksandr Tretyakov of Russia (right) are their countries' first Olympic medalists in this discipline.

#	Number of medals won by the NOC	–	NOC did not win any medals

NOC	1924	28	32–36	48	52–98	02	06	10	14	18	22	26	Total
Australia		–		–		–	–	–	–	–	1	–	1
Austria		–		–		1	–	–	–	–	–	1	2
China		–		–		–	–	–	–	–	1	–	1
Canada		–		–		–	3	1	–	–	–	–	4
Germany		–		–		–	–	2	–	1	3	6	12
Great Britain		1		1		1	1	1	1	3	–	2	11
Italy		–		1		–	–	–	–	–	–	–	1
Latvia		–		–		–	–	1	1	–	–	–	2
Netherlands		–		–		–	–	–	–	–	1	–	1
Olympic Athletes from Russia		–		–		–	–	–	–	1	–	–	1
Russia		–		–		–	–	1	2	–	–	–	3
South Korea		–		–		–	–	–	–	1	–	–	1
Switzerland		–		–		1	2	–	–	–	–	–	3
United States		2		1		3	–	–	2	–	–	–	8

== See also ==
- IBSF World Championships (bobsleigh and skeleton)
- List of Skeleton World Cup champions
