= Skeleton at the 2006 Winter Olympics – Men's =

Men's Skeleton at the XX Olympic Winter Games
- Pictogram for skeleton
- Venue: Cesana Pariol
- Dates: 17 February 2006
- Competitors: 27 from 19 nations

Medalists
1st place, gold medalist(s)		Duff Gibson	Canada
2nd place, silver medalist(s)		Jeff Pain	Canada
3rd place, bronze medalist(s)		Gregor Stähli	Switzerland

The men's skeleton at the 2006 Winter Olympics took place on 17 February, at the Cesana Pariol.

== Results ==
Canadians Duff Gibson and Jeffrey Pain won gold and silver despite Pain nearly losing control of his sled coming around the penultimate corner. Switzerland's Gregor Stähli finished third, beating out Canadian Paul Boehm by only two tenths of a second to prevent a Canadian sweep of the podium. Gibson dedicated his medal to his father, Andy, who had died in December 2005 after an 11-year battle with cancer.

A picture of Gibson in action during this event would be used as a pictogram for the skeleton events at the following Winter Olympics.

Rank	Name	Country	Run 1	Run 2	Total	Diff.
1	Duff Gibson	Canada	0:57.80	0:58.08	1:55.88	—
2	Jeff Pain	Canada	0:57.98	0:58.16	1:56.14	+0.26
3	Gregor Stähli	Switzerland	0:58.39	0:58.41	1:56.80	+0.92
4	Paul Boehm	Canada	0:58.61	0:58.45	1:57.06	+1.18
5	Kristan Bromley	Great Britain	0:58.35	0:58.75	1:57.10	+1.22
6	Eric Bernotas	United States	0:58.43	0:58.76	1:57.19	+1.31
7	Martins Dukurs	Latvia	0:58.79	0:58.60	1:57.39	+1.51
8	Adam Pengilly	Great Britain	0:58.37	0:59.09	1:57.46	+1.58
9	Sebastian Haupt	Germany	0:58.48	0:59.10	1:57.58	+1.70
10	Ben Sandford	New Zealand	0:59.16	0:58.60	1:57.76	+1.88
11	Kazuhiro Koshi	Japan	0:58.65	0:59.40	1:58.05	+2.17
12	Maurizio Oioli	Italy	0:59.28	0:59.24	1:58.52	+2.64
13	Martin Rettl	Austria	0:59.23	0:59.53	1:58.76	+2.88
14	Phillippe Cavoret	France	0:59.79	0:59.08	1:58.87	+2.99
15	Aleksandr Tretyakov	Russia	0:59.71	0:59.32	1:59.03	+3.15
16	Markus Penz	Austria	0:59.55	0:59.51	1:59.06	+3.18
17	Kevin Ellis	United States	0:59.46	0:59.75	1:59.21	+3.33
18	Masaru Inada	Japan	0:59.63	0:59.74	1:59.37	+3.49
19	Patrick Singleton	Bermuda	1:00.06	0:59.75	1:59.81	+3.93
20	David Connolly	Ireland	0:59.97	1:00.00	1:59.97	+4.09
21	Tyler Botha	South Africa	0:59.43	1:00.63	2:00.06	+4.18
22	Shaun Boyle	Australia	1:00.13	1:00.00	2:00.13	+4.25
23	Kang Kwang Bae	South Korea	1:00.41	0:59.88	2:00.29	+4.41
24	Frank Rommel	Germany	0:59.94	1:00.41	2:00.35	+4.47
25	Chris Soule	United States	1:00.33	1:00.90	2:01.23	+5.35
26	Nikola Nimac	Croatia	1:01.86	1:02.44	2:04.30	+8.42
27	Patrick Antaki	Lebanon	1:03.01	1:01.43	2:04.44	+8.56
