= Skeleton at the 2002 Winter Olympics – Men's =

Men's Skeleton at the XIX Olympic Winter Games
- Pictogram for skeleton
- Venue: Utah Olympic Park
- Dates: February 20, 2002
- Competitors: 26 from 18 nations

Medalists
1st place, gold medalist(s)		Jimmy Shea	United States
2nd place, silver medalist(s)		Martin Rettl	Austria
3rd place, bronze medalist(s)		Gregor Stähli	Switzerland

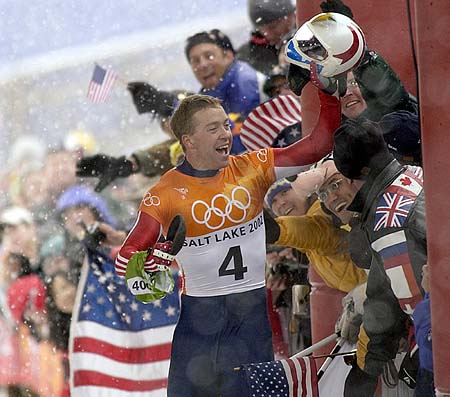
Gold medalist Jimmy Shea celebrating after his victory

The men's skeleton at the 2002 Winter Olympics took place on 20 February, on the Utah Olympic Park Track at the Utah Olympic Park in Salt Lake City, Utah. The event featured 26 competitors from 18 nations. American Jimmy Shea won the event at his home Olympics, while Martin Rettl of Austria and Gregor Stähli of Switzerland finished second and third respectively. This was the first time a skeleton event was held at the Winter Olympics since 1948, and was the third Olympic skeleton event in history.

== Background ==
In 1999, the International Olympic Committee (IOC) announced the addition of skeleton to the 2002 Olympic program. This would be the first time skeleton had been hosted at the Olympics since 1948, and its first time being hosted at the Games outside of St. Moritz, Switzerland.

== Results ==
Rank	Name	Country	Run 1	Run 2	Total	Diff.
1	Jimmy Shea	United States	50.89	51.07	1:41.96	—
2	Martin Rettl	Austria	51.02	50.99	1:42.01	+0.05
3	Gregor Stähli	Switzerland	51.16	50.99	1:42.15	+0.19
4	Clifton Wrottesley	Ireland	51.07	51.50	1:42.57	+0.61
5	Lincoln Dewitt	United States	51.63	51.20	1:42.83	+0.87
6	Jeff Pain	Canada	51.51	51.41	1:42.92	+0.96
7	Chris Soule	United States	51.89	51.09	1:42.98	+1.02
8	Kazuhiro Koshi	Japan	51.50	51.52	1:43.02	+1.06
9	Wilfried Schneider	Germany	51.67	51.47	1:43.14	+1.18
10	Duff Gibson	Canada	51.40	51.76	1:43.16	+1.20
11	Frank Kleber	Germany	51.58	51.76	1:43.34	+1.38
12	Christian Auer	Austria	51.81	51.56	1:43.37	+1.41
13	Kristan Bromley	Great Britain	52.17	51.26	1:43.43	+1.47
14	Snorre Pedersen	Norway	52.07	51.70	1:43.77	+1.81
15	Pascal Richard	Canada	51.98	51.86	1:43.84	+1.88
16	Felix Poletti	Switzerland	51.76	52.11	1:43.87	+1.91
17	Philippe Cavoret	France	51.92	51.96	1:43.88	+1.92
18	Masaru Inada	Japan	52.05	51.93	1:43.98	+2.02
19	Christian Steger	Italy	52.25	52.15	1:44.40	+2.44
20	Kang Kwang-Bae	South Korea	52.11	52.40	1:44.51	+2.55
21	Tomass Dukurs	Latvia	52.29	52.38	1:44.67	+2.71
22	Konstantin Aladashvili	Russia	52.92	52.67	1:45.59	+3.63
23	Michael Voudouris	Greece	54.11	54.33	1:48.44	+6.48
24	Josef Chuchla	Czech Republic	54.02	54.64	1:48.66	+6.70
25	Luis Carrasco	Mexico	54.32	54.66	1:48.98	+7.02
26	German Glessner	Argentina	55.40	57.25	1:52.65	+10.69
