= Ryan Davenport =

Canadian skeleton racer

Medal record

Skeleton

World Championships
Gold medal – first place	1996 Calgary	Men
Gold medal – first place	1997 Lake Placid	Men
Bronze medal – third place	1995 Lillehammer	Men

Ryan Davenport is a Canadian skeleton racer who competed from 1993 to 1999. He won three medals in the men's skeleton event at the FIBT World Championships with two golds (1996, 1997) and one bronze (1995).

A native of Calgary, Alberta, Davenport makes his own sleds that are in use by other for the Skeleton World Cup from the FIBT (International Bobsleigh and Tobogganing Federation) from his home in De Winton, Alberta. He is the cousin of Mellisa Hollingsworth, a skeleton racer also from Canada.

Davenport won the men's Skeleton World Cup overall title in 1995–96.

He started coaching the U.S. Olympic Skeleton team in 1999, during the 2002 Winter Olympics in Salt Lake City three members of his team achieved medals: Jim Shea, gold; Tristan Gale, gold and Lea Ann Parsley, silver. During Davenport's tenure as U.S. coach, his team had received at least one medal in every race.

Davenport was one of the five finalists for USOC National Coach of the Year in 2002.
