= Skeleton at the 2002 Winter Olympics – Women's =

Women's Skeleton at the XIX Olympic Winter Games
- Pictogram for skeleton
- Venue: Utah Olympic Park
- Dates: February 20, 2002
- Competitors: 13 from 10 nations

Medalists
1st place, gold medalist(s)		Tristan Gale	United States
2nd place, silver medalist(s)		Lea Ann Parsley	United States
3rd place, bronze medalist(s)		Alex Coomber	Great Britain

The women's skeleton at the 2002 Winter Olympics took place on 20 February, at the Utah Olympic Park.

== Results ==
Rank	Name	Country	Run 1	Run 2	Total	Diff.
1	Tristan Gale	United States	52.26	52.85	1:45.11	—
2	Lea Ann Parsley	United States	52.27	52.94	1:45.21	+0.10
3	Alex Coomber	Great Britain	52.48	52.89	1:45.37	+0.26
4	Diana Sartor	Germany	52.55	52.98	1:45.53	+0.42
5	Maya Pedersen	Switzerland	52.92	52.63	1:45.55	+0.44
6	Lindsay Alcock	Canada	52.62	53.07	1:45.69	+0.58
7	Yekaterina Mironova	Russia	52.97	52.98	1:45.95	+0.84
7	Steffi Hanzlik	Germany	52.82	53.13	1:45.95	+0.84
9	Dany Locati	Italy	53.19	53.46	1:46.65	+1.54
10	Michelle Kelly	Canada	53.76	53.56	1:47.32	+2.21
11	Liz Couch	New Zealand	53.62	54.18	1:47.80	+2.69
12	Eiko Nakayama	Japan	54.00	54.72	1:48.72	+3.61
13	Cindy Ninos	Greece	54.54	54.74	1:49.28	+4.17
