= Urs Vescoli =

Swiss-Australian skeleton racer

Urs Vescoli (born 7 November 1966) is a skeleton racer. He formerly competed for Switzerland, and subsequently for Australia. He did not compete in the 2006 Winter Olympics; fellow Australian Shaun Boyle did.

He holds an unofficial World Record: He has competed on the highest number of tracks around the world – 18 bobsleigh tracks plus the Cresta Run in St. Moritz, Switzerland.

In 1985 he won the bronze medal in the European Skeleton Championship. In 1990 he won the Skeleton World Cup race in Calgary and finished second in the overall standings of the 1989–90 season, behind Christian Auer.

== World Cup 2005/2006 Results ==
- DNS on 10 November 2005, Calgary CAN
- 21st on 17 November 2005, Lake Placid, New York, U.S.
