= Joska Le Conté =

Dutch skeleton racer (born 1987)

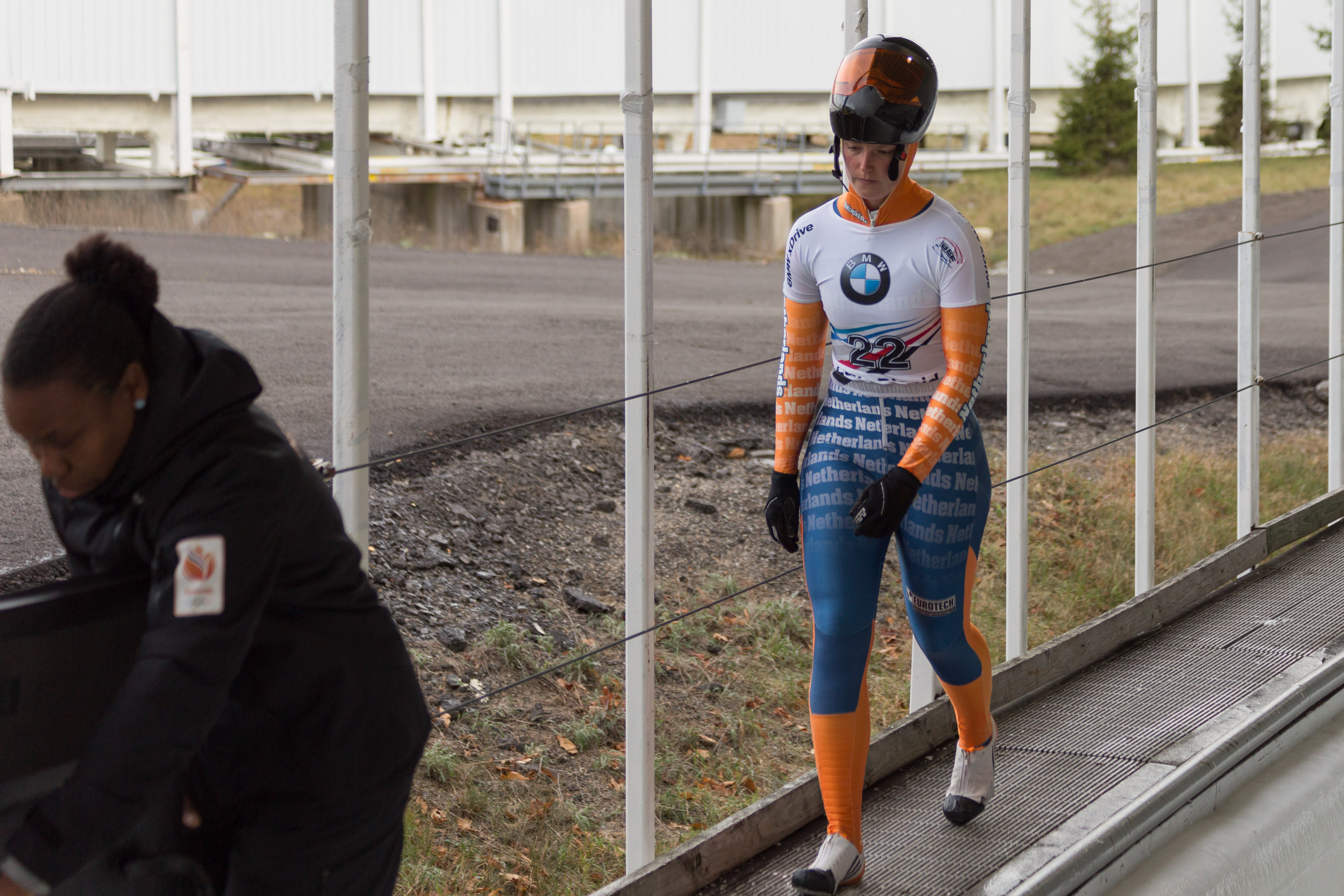
- Le Conté at the Lake Placid World Cup in 2017

Personal information
- Nationality: Dutch
- Born: 29 September 1987 (age 37); Zeist, the Netherlands
- Height: 170 cm (5 ft 7 in)
- Weight: 68 kg (150 lb)
- Website: http://joskaleconte.com/

Sport
- Country: Netherlands
- Sport: Skeleton
- Coached by: Martin Rettl

Joska Le Conté (born 29 September 1987, in Zeist) is a Dutch skeleton racer who has competed since 2006. Prior to starting in skeleton, she was a pole vaulter; when not competing, she works for the Royal Dutch Motorsport Association (KNMV) as a policy officer. Her skeleton coach is Martin Rettl, who works with a number of athletes from small nations under the name "Badass Skeleton Team". Although Le Conté earned a second quota for Dutch women's skeleton at the 2018 Winter Olympics in Pyeongchang, she did not meet the stricter qualification standards of the Dutch Olympic Committee, and the second Dutch quota was reallocated to Switzerland.

== Notable results ==
Le Conté started racing on the Europe Cup in the 2006–07 season, when she finished four races including the European Championships (in which she finished 15th). The following season, she continued to start Europe Cup races, but also added Intercontinental Cup and North American Cup races to her schedule; at the Junior World Championships in 2008, she finished 7th. In the 2008–09 season, she began racing at the World Cup level, and since 2010 has primarily raced World Cup events. At the 2010 Junior Worlds in St. Moritz, she finished 5th in her final year of eligibility.

Le Conté's best results on the World Cup have come at Königssee in 2014–15 and again at St. Moritz in 2015–16 when she finished seventh. Her best result at the World Championships came in the same two seasons, finishing 15th at Igls and Winterberg, respectively.
