= Skeleton at the Winter Olympics =

- IOC Code: SKN
- Governing body: IBSF
- Events: 3 (men: 1; women: 1; mixed: 1)

Winter Olympics
- 1924; 1928; 1932; 1936; 1948; 1952; 1956; 1960; 1964; 1968; 1972; 1976; 1980; 1984; 1988; 1992; 1994; 1998; 2002; 2006; 2010; 2014; 2018; 2022; 2026
- Medalists

Skeleton is a winter sport featured in the Winter Olympics where the competitor rides head-first and prone (lying face down) on a flat sled. It is normally run on an ice track that allows the sled to gain speed by gravity.

Skeleton was first included in the Olympic programme at the 1928 Winter Olympics in St. Moritz, using the Cresta Run. It appeared again at the 1948 Winter Olympics, also held in St. Moritz, but was then dropped from the programme. The sport's dependence on a single venue, the limited number of suitable tracks worldwide, and safety concerns all contributed to its 54-year absence from the Games.

In October 1999, the International Olympic Committee (IOC) added the discipline to the 2002 Salt Lake City Olympics sports program, with both men's and women's events, and it has been held in each Winter Olympic competition since. In June 2022, the IOC added a third event, the mixed team, to the sports program at the 2026 Winter Olympics.

== Non-traditional winter sport nations ==
Since skeleton's Olympic return in 2002, the sport has attracted competitors from countries with little or no natural ice or snow, including Jamaica, Ghana, Nigeria, Brazil, Bermuda, Mexico, and the United States Virgin Islands. At the 2018 Winter Olympics, Akwasi Frimpong became the first black African male skeleton racer to compete at the Games, representing Ghana, while Simidele Adeagbo became the first black African female skeleton Olympian, competing for Nigeria.

== Summary ==
Games	Year	Events	Best Nation
1			
2	1928	1	United States (1)
3			
4			
5	1948	1	Italy (1)
6 → 18			
19	2002	2	United States (2)

Games	Year	Events	Best Nation
20	2006	2	Canada (1)
21	2010	2	Canada (2); Great Britain (1)
22	2014	2	Russia (1)
23	2018	2	Great Britain (2)
24	2022	2	Germany (1)
25	2026	3	Great Britain (3)

== Events ==
Event	24	28	32	36	48	52	56	60	64	68	72	76	80	84	88	92	94	98	02	06	10	14	18	22	26	Years
Men's skeleton		•			•														•	•	•	•	•	•	•	9
Women's skeleton																			•	•	•	•	•	•	•	7
Mixed team skeleton																									•	1
Total events		1			1														2	2	2	2	2	2	3	

== Medal table ==
Accurate as of 2026 Winter Olympics.

Rank	Nation	Gold	Silver	Bronze	Total
1	Great Britain	5	1	5	11
2	United States	3	4	1	8
3	Germany	2	6	4	12
4	Canada	2	1	1	4
5	Austria	1	1	0	2
6	Russia	1	0	2	3
6	Switzerland	1	0	2	3
8	Italy	1	0	0	1
8	South Korea	1	0	0	1
10	Latvia	0	2	0	2
11	Australia	0	1	0	1
11	Olympic Athletes from Russia	0	1	0	1
13	China	0	0	1	1
13	Netherlands	0	0	1	1
Totals (14 entries)		17	17	17	51

== Participating nations ==
Numbers indicate the number of skeleton racers each nation sent to each respective edition of the games.

Nation	24	28	32	36	48	52	56	60	64	68	72	76	80	84	88	92	94	98	02	06	10	14	18	22	26	Years
American Samoa																								1		1
Argentina																			1							1
Australia																				2	3	3	2	2	1	6
Austria		2			1														2	2	1	3	2	3	3	9
Belgium																							1	1	1	3
Bermuda																				1						1
Brazil																								1	1	2
Canada																			5	5	6	4	6	3	3	7
China																							1	4	5	3
Croatia																				1						1
Czech Republic																			1					1	1	3
Denmark																									2	1
Estonia																									1	1
France		1			1														1	1	1				1	6
Germany																			4	4	6	5	6	6	6	7
Ghana																							1			1
Great Britain		1			4														2	3	4	4	4	4	5	9
Greece																			2			1				2
Ireland																			1	1	1	1				4
Israel																							1		1	2
Italy		2			1														2	2	2	1	1	3	4	9
Jamaica																							1			1
Japan																			3	3	3	3	3		1	6
Latvia																			1	1	2	3	3	3	2	7
Lebanon																				1						1
Mexico																			1							1
Netherlands																							1	1	1	3
New Zealand																			1	2	3	2	1			5
Nigeria																							1			1
Norway																			1	1	1		1			4
Olympic Athletes from Russia																							2			1
Poland																				1						1
Puerto Rico																								1	1	2
Romania																					1	2	2			3
ROC																								6		1
Russia																			2	2	4	6				4
Slovenia																					1					1
South Africa																				1					1	2
South Korea																			1		1	2	3	3	3	6
Spain																					1	1	1	1		4
Switzerland		2			4														3	3	2	1	1	1	1	9
Ukraine																							1	1	1	3
United States		2			4														5	4	5	5	4	3	4	9
Virgin Islands																								1		1
Nations		6			6														19	21	19	17	24	21	23	
Skeleton racers		10			15														39	42	48	47	50	50	50	

== See also ==
- List of Olympic venues in skeleton
