= Thomas Schreiber =

Thomas Schreiber may refer to:

- Thomas Schreiber (bobsledder), Swiss bobsledder
- Thomas Schreiber (innkeeper), German innkeeper executed for witchcraft
