= Voudouris =

Voudouris is a surname. Notable people with the surname include:

- Dimitri Voudouris (born 1961), Greek electronic musician and composer
- Michael Voudouris (born 1960), American-born Greek skeleton racer
- Roger Voudouris (1954–2003), American singer-songwriter and guitarist
