= List of Olympic venues in skeleton =

For the Winter Olympics, there have been nine venues that have been or will be used for skeleton. When the Winter Olympics were in St. Moritz, they took place at the Cresta Run for both 1928 and 1948. Since being re-introduced at the 2002 Winter Olympics, skeleton has shared the same venue with the other sliding sports of bobsleigh and luge.

Games	Venue	Other sports hosted at venue for those games	Capacity	Ref.
1928 St. Moritz	Cresta Run	None	Not listed.	
1948 St. Moritz	Cresta Run	None	Not listed.	
2002 Salt Lake City	Utah Olympic Park Track	Bobsleigh, Luge	15,000	
2006 Turin	Cesana Pariol	Bobsleigh, Luge	4,400	
2010 Vancouver	The Whistler Sliding Centre	Bobsleigh, Luge	12,000	
2014 Sochi	Sliding Center Sanki	Bobsleigh, Luge	9,000	
2018 PyeongChang	Olympic Sliding Centre	Bobsleigh, Luge	7,000 (including 6,000 standing)	
2022 Beijing	Yanqing National Sliding Centre	Bobsleigh, Luge	10,000 (including 8,500 standing)	
2026 Milan-Cortina	Cortina Sliding Centre	Bobsleigh, Luge	Not listed.	
2030 French Alps	La Plagne	Bobsleigh, Luge	16,000	
2034 Utah	Utah Olympic Park Track	Bobsleigh, Luge	12,000	

== Gallery of venues ==
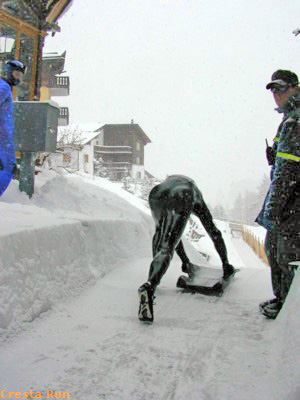
Cresta Run hosted skeleton at the 1928 and 1948 Winter Olympics in St. Moritz.

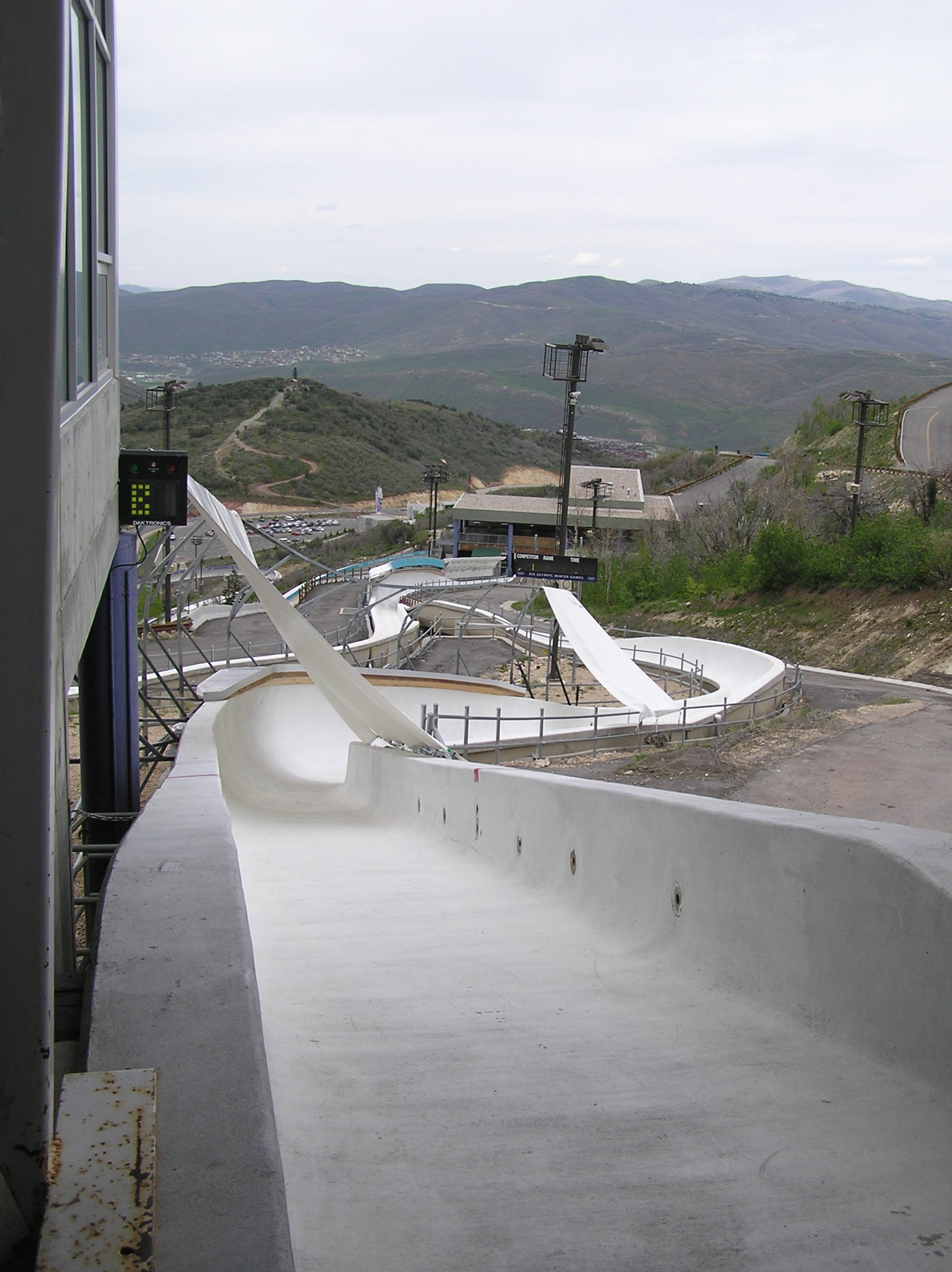
The Utah Olympic Park Track hosted skeleton at the 2002 Winter Olympics in Salt Lake City and will do so again in 2034.

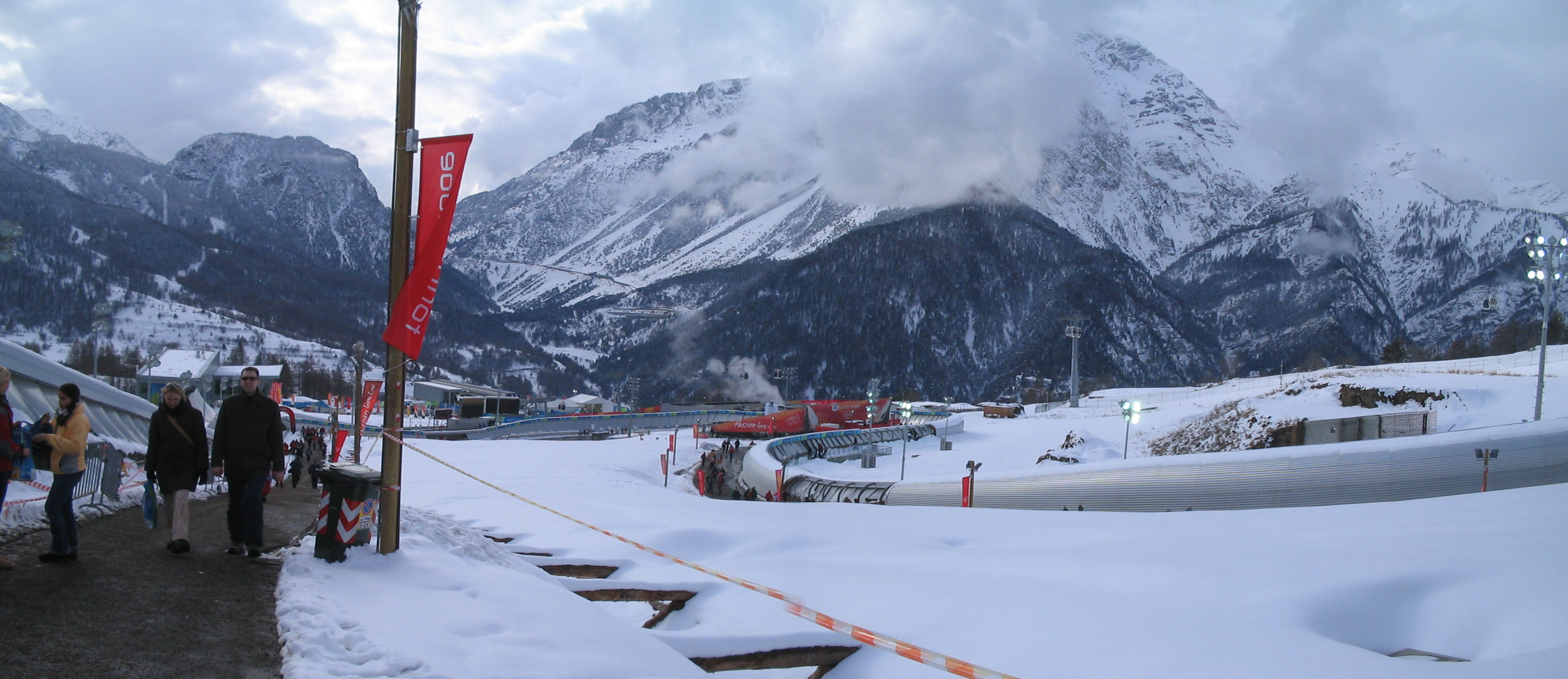
Cesana Pariol hosted skeleton at the 2006 Winter Olympics in Turin.

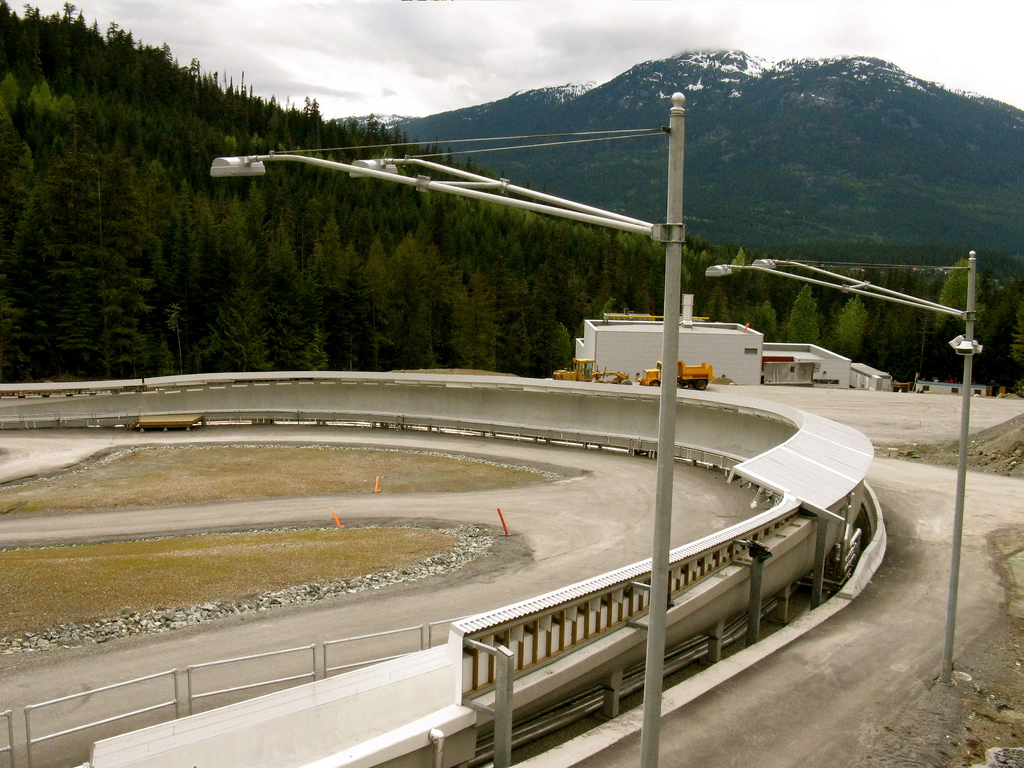
The Whistler Sliding Centre hosted skeleton at the 2010 Winter Olympics on Vancouver.

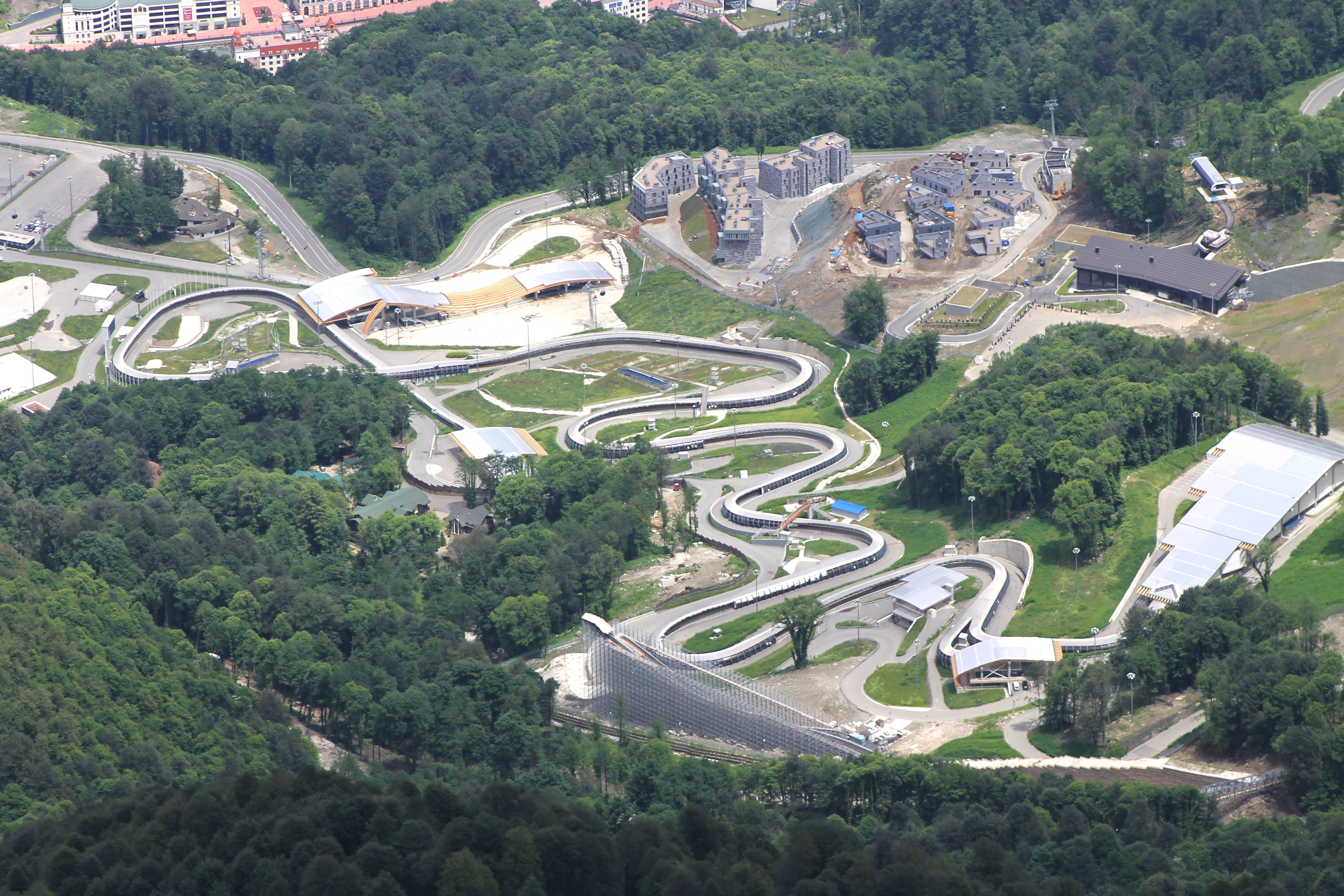
Sliding Center Sanki hosted skeleton at the 2014 Winter Olympics in Sochi.

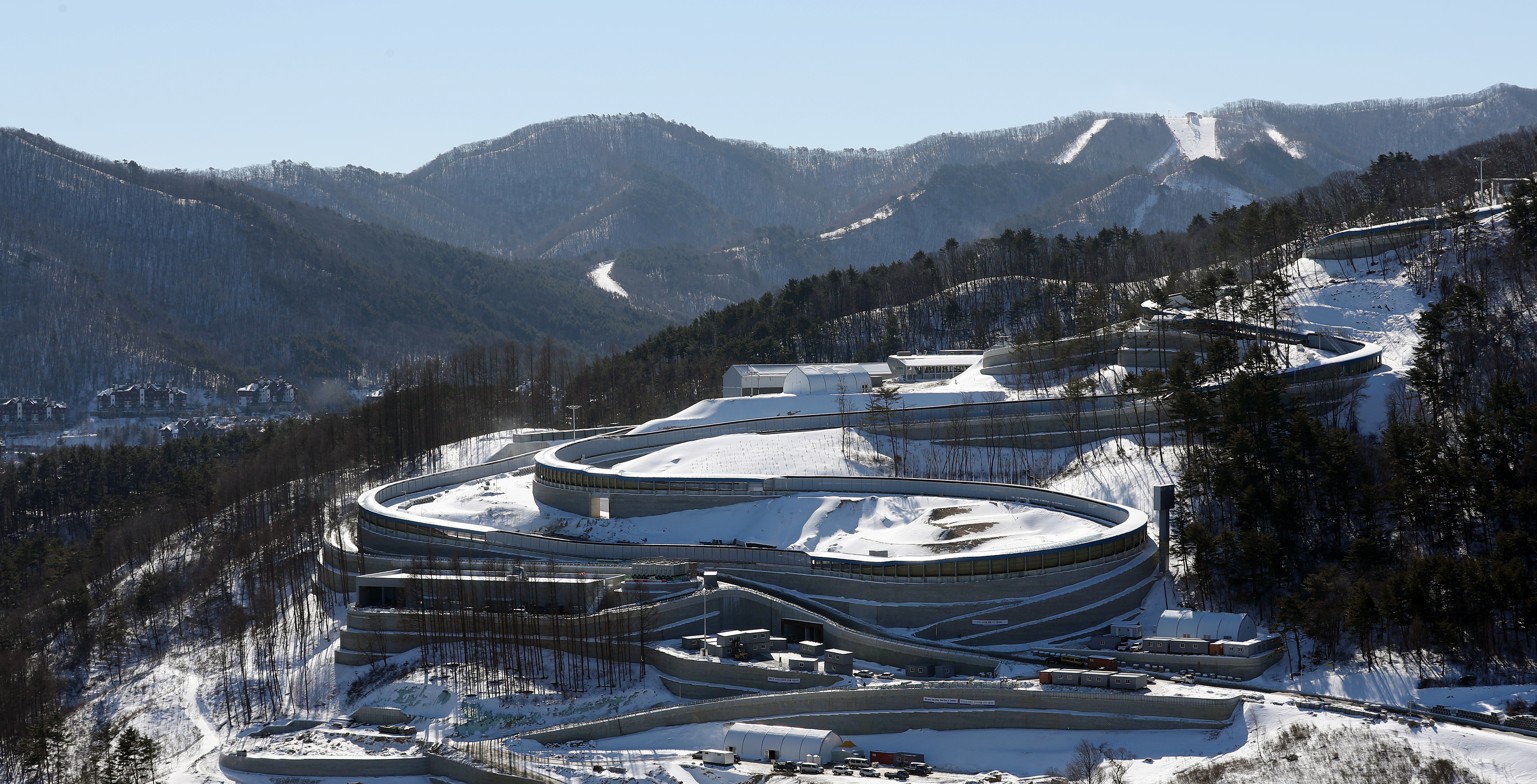
The Olympic Sliding Centre hosted skeleton at the 2018 Winter Olympics in Pyeongchang.

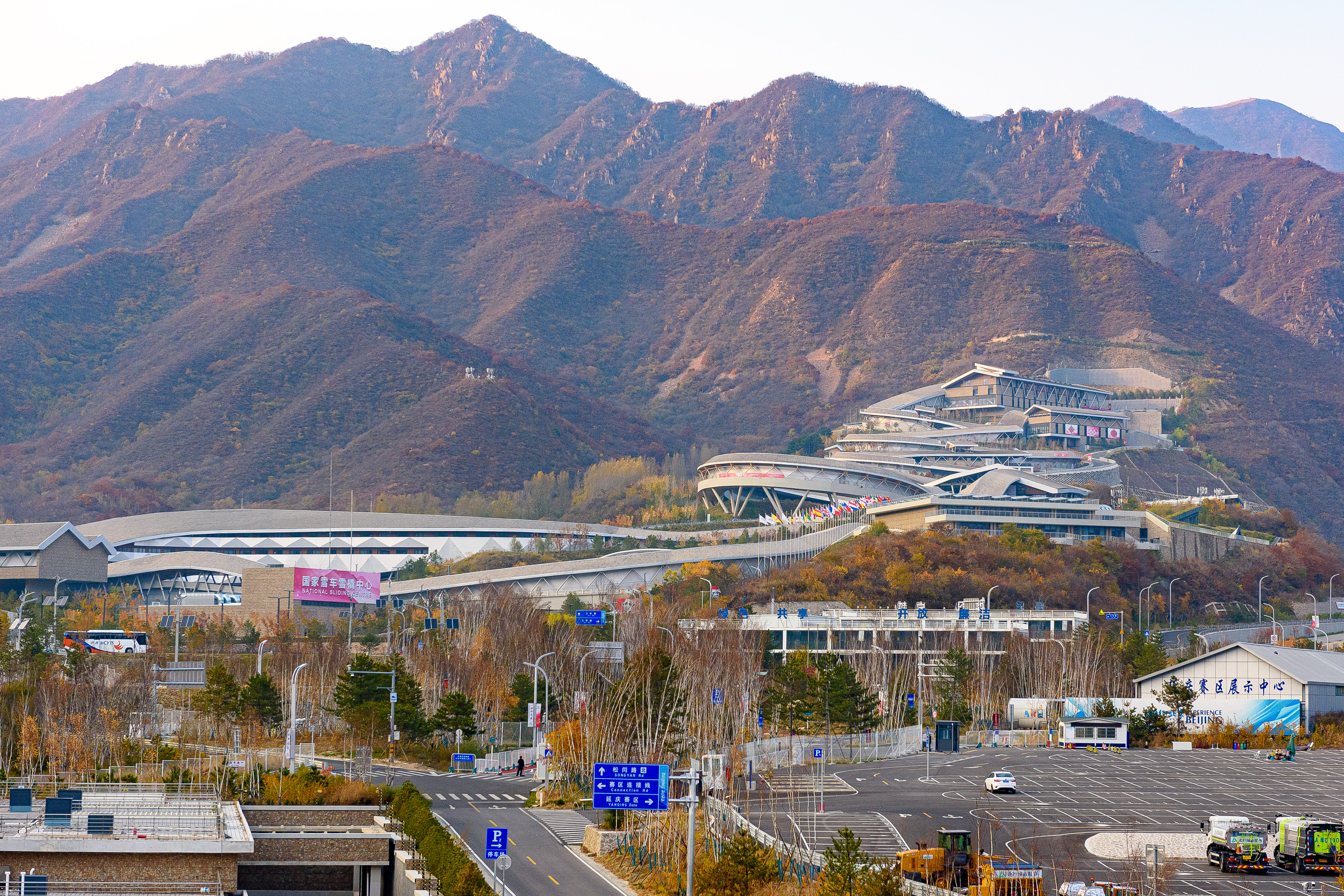
Yanqing National Sliding Centre hosted skeleton at the 2022 Winter Olympics in Beijing.

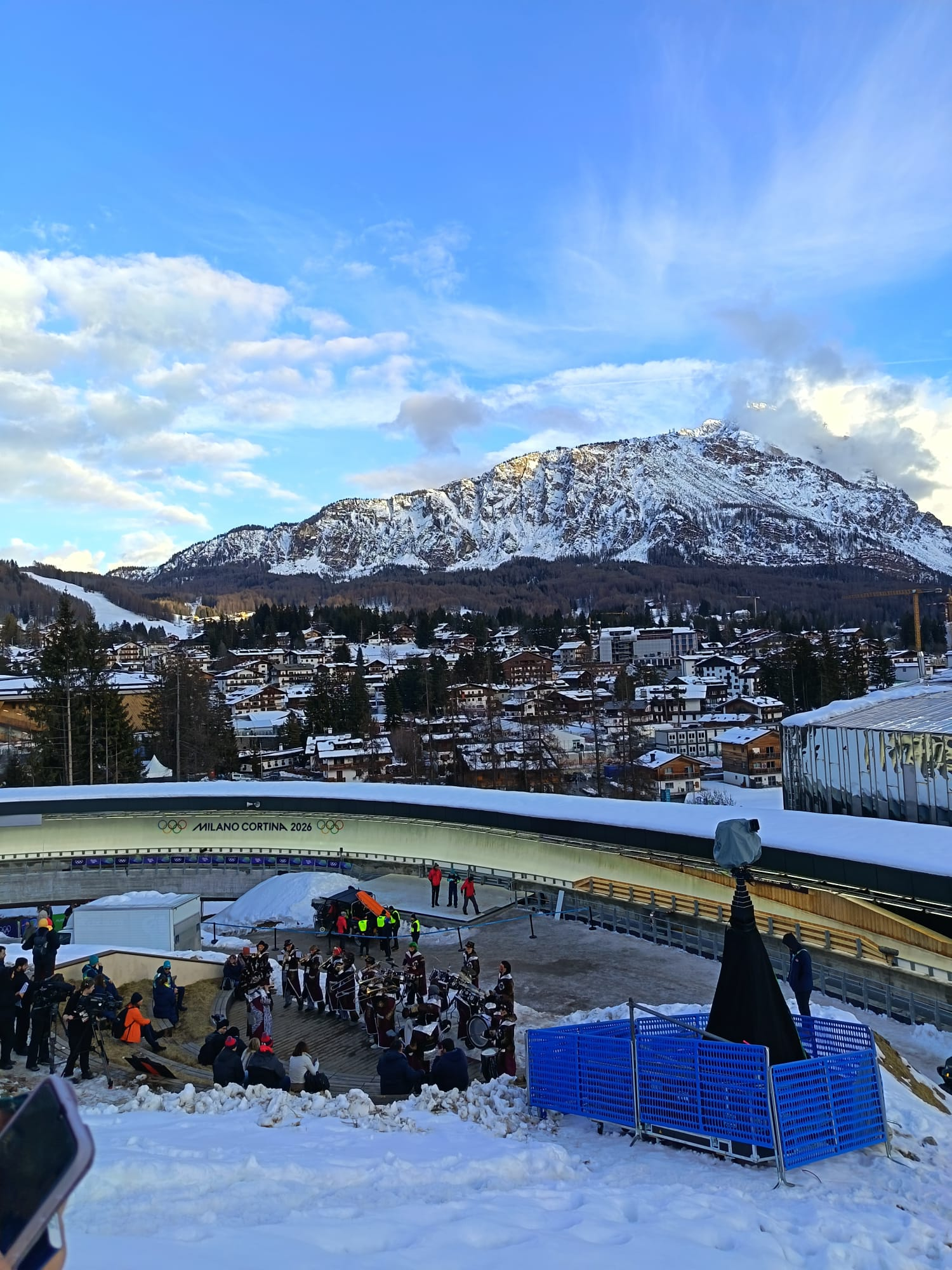
The Cortina Sliding Centre hosted skeleton at the 2026 Winter Olympics in Cortina d’Ampezzo.

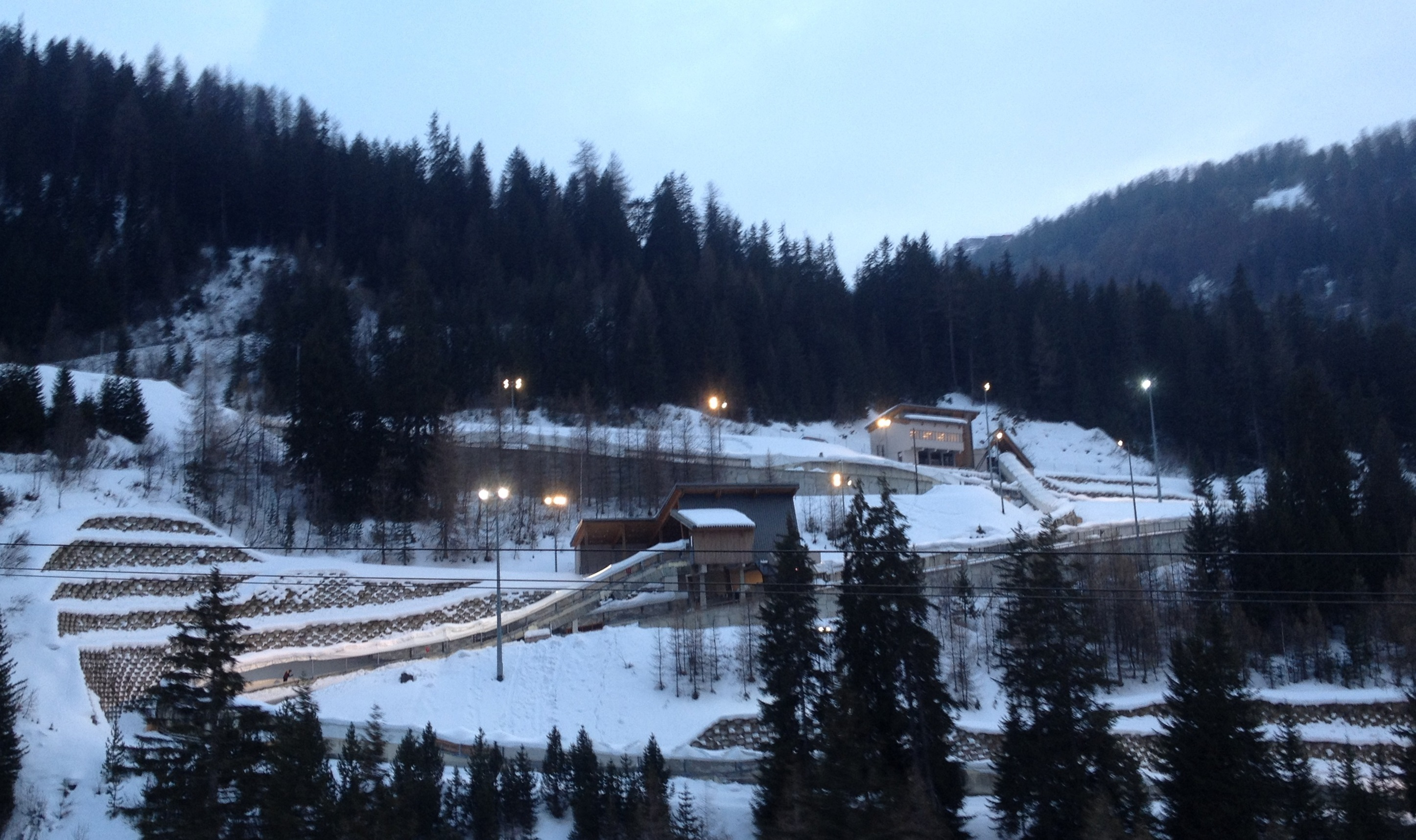
La Plagne bobsleigh, luge, and skeleton track will host skeleton at the 2030 Winter Olympics in the French Alps.
