= Skeleton at the 2002 Winter Olympics =

Skeleton at the XIX Olympic Winter Games
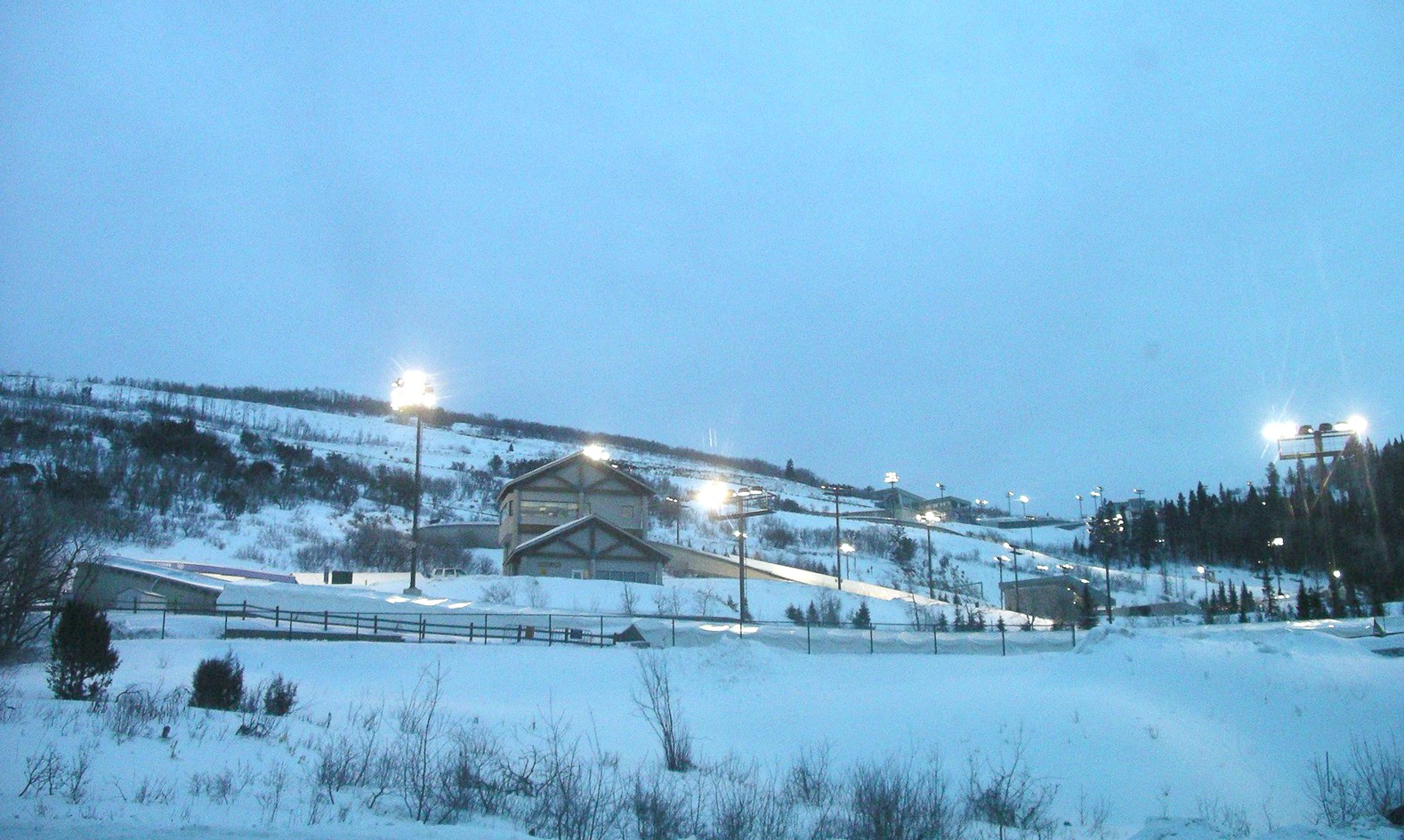
- Utah Olympic Park Track
- Venue: Utah Olympic Park
- Dates: February 20, 2002
- Competitors: 39 from 19 nations

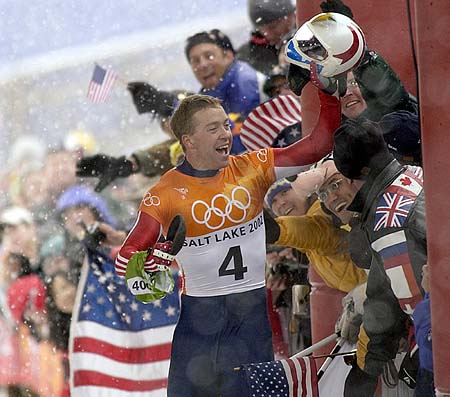
Skeleton gold medalist Jimmy Shea Jr. at the 2002 Winter Olympics

Skeleton returned to the program of the Winter Olympic Games for the first time in 54 years at the 2002 Games in Salt Lake City, Utah. This was the first time Olympic competitions in skeleton were held during an Olympics outside of St. Moritz. Both men and women competed, with women competing for the first time in Olympic history. Medals were awarded after five runs down the course. Both events were contested on February 20.

== Medal summary ==
| Event | Gold | Silver | Bronze |
|---|---|---|---|
| Men's | Jim Shea Jr. United States 1:41.96 | Martin Rettl; Austria 1:42.01 | Gregor Stähli; Switzerland 1:42.15 |
| Women's | Tristan Gale; United States 1:45.11 | Lea Ann Parsley; United States 1:45.21 | Alex Coomber; Great Britain 1:45.37 |

== Medal table ==
| Rank | Nation | Gold | Silver | Bronze | Total |
|---|---|---|---|---|---|
| 1 | United States | 2 | 1 | 0 | 3 |
| 2 | Austria | 0 | 1 | 0 | 1 |
| 3 | Great Britain | 0 | 0 | 1 | 1 |
| 3 | Switzerland | 0 | 0 | 1 | 1 |
| Totals (4 entries) | | 2 | 2 | 2 | 6 |

== Participating NOCs ==
Nineteen nations competed in the skeleton events at Salt Lake City.

- Argentina
- Austria
- Canada
- Czech Republic
- France
- Germany
- Great Britain
- Greece
- Ireland
- Italy
- Japan
- Latvia
- Mexico
- New Zealand
- Norway
- Russia
- South Korea
- Switzerland
- United States
