= 1994 World Championships =

1994 World Championships may refer to:

- 1994 World Aquatics Championships
- 1994 World Artistic Gymnastics Championships
- 1994 World Artistic Gymnastics Championships (Team)
- 1994 World Junior Championships in Athletics
- 1994 FIBA World Championship in basketball
- 1994 FIBA World Championship for Women in basketball
- Biathlon World Championships 1994
- 1994 UCI Road World Championships in bicycle road racing
- FIBT World Championships 1994 in bobsleigh and skeleton
- 1994 ICF Canoe Sprint World Championships
- 1994 IAAF World Cross Country Championships
- 1994 World Men's Curling Championship
- 1994 World Women's Curling Championship
- 1994 BDO World Darts Championship
- 1994 WDC World Darts Championship
- 1994 World Fencing Championships
- 1994 World Figure Skating Championships
- 1994 IAAF World Half Marathon Championships
- 1994 Men's World Ice Hockey Championships
- 1994 IIHF Women's World Championship in ice hockey
- 1994 World Junior Ice Hockey Championships
- FIL World Luge Natural Track Championships 1994
- 1994 World Rhythmic Gymnastics Championships
- FIS Ski-Flying World Championships 1994
- 1994 World Snooker Championship
- 1994 ISF Women's World Championship in softball
- 1994 Individual Speedway World Championship
- 1994 Individual Speedway Junior World Championship
- 1994 Superbike World Championship season
- 1994 ATP Tour World Championships in tennis
- 1994 Trampoline World Championships
- 1994 ITU Triathlon World Championships
- 1994 FIVB Men's Volleyball World Championship
- 1994 FIVB Women's World Championship in volleyball
- 1994 World Weightlifting Championships
- 1994 World Wrestling Championships
- 1994 Star World Championships in yachting
