= Thaler (disambiguation) =

Thaler is a silver coin used throughout Europe for almost four hundred years.

Thaler may also refer to:

- Thaler (surname)
- Kaplan Thaler Group, an integrated marketing and advertising agency based in New York City
