= Jackie Gunn =

British bobsledder

Personal information
- Born: Jacqueline Davies; 23 May 1977 (age 49) Liverpool, Lancashire, England
Medal record
Bobsleigh
Representing Great Britain
World Championships
Silver medal – second place	2005 Calgary	Two-woman

Jacqueline Gunn (née Davies, born 23 May 1977) is a British bobsledder who has competed since 1999. She won a silver medal in the two-woman event at the 2005 FIBT World Championships in Calgary.

Competing in two Winter Olympics, Davies earned her best finish of ninth in the two-woman event at Turin in 2006.

Now retired from competing in bobsleigh, Gunn is currently completing a 3 year degree in nursing in Belfast.

Davies married Peter Gunn in May 2008.
