= Thaler (surname) =

Thaler is a surname of Austrian (Tyrol, Wildschönau) origin. It may refer to:

- Barbara Thaler (born 1982), an Austrian politician
- Ben Thaler (born 1981), a professional rugby league referee
- Bjorn Thaler, CFO of One Medical
- Erwin Thaler (1930–2001), an Austrian bobsledder
- Franz Thaler (1925–2015), Italian writer
- Helmut Thaler (born 1940), an Austrian luger
- Herbert Thaler (born 1940), an Austrian luger
- Johann Thaler (1920–1945), an Oberscharführer in the Waffen SS during World War II
- Josef Thaler, an Austrian luger
- Karin Thaler (born 1965), German actress
- Klaus-Peter Thaler (born 1949), a German professional cyclist
- Konrad Thaler (1940–2005), an Austrian arachnologist
- Mario Thaler (living), a German music producer
- Martin Thaler (living), an Austrian skeleton racer
- Pat Koch Thaler (1932–2024), American educator, author, and activist
- Patrick Thaler (born 1978), an Italian alpine skier
- Richard Thaler (born 1945), American economist and Nobel Laureate
- Robert Thaler (living), an American actor
- Seymour R. Thaler (1919–1976), New York state senator
- William J. Thaler (1925–2005), an American experimental physicist
- Zoran Thaler (born 1962), a Slovenian politician and businessman
