= Michael Grünberger =

Austrian luger and skeleton racer

Medal record

Skeleton

World Championships
| Gold medal – first place | 1990 Königssee | Men |
| Bronze medal – third place | 1991 Igls | Men |

Michael Grünberger is an Austrian luger and skeleton racer who competed during the 1990s.

As a skeleton athlete, he won two medals in the men's event at the FIBT World Championships with a gold in 1990 and a bronze in 1990. His best finish in the Skeleton World Cup was second twice in the men's event (1990—1, 1995—6).

Grünberger's only World cup victory in luge took place in Igls in 1990.
