= FIBT World Championships 1996 =

Bobsleigh and skeleton competition

1996 World Championships
- Location: Calgary, Alberta, Canada

The FIBT World Championships 1996 took place in Calgary, Alberta, Canada for a second time, hosting the event previously in 1992 (Skeleton). It marked the first time the bobsleigh and skeleton competition took place in the same location at the championships since 1982.

== Two man bobsleigh ==
Pos	Team	Time
Gold	Germany (Christoph Langen, Markus Zimmermann)	
Silver	Canada (Pierre Lueders, Dave MacEachern)	
Bronze	Switzerland (Reto Götschi, Guido Acklin)	

== Four man bobsleigh ==
Pos	Team	Time
Gold	Germany (Christoph Langen, Markus Zimmermann, Sven Rühr, Olav Hampel)	
Silver	Switzerland (Marcel Rohner, Markus Wasser, Thomas Schreiber, Roland Tanner)	
Bronze	Germany (Wolfgang Hoppe, Thorsten Voss, Sven Peter, Carsten Embach)	

== Men's skeleton ==
Pos	Athlete	Time
Gold	Ryan Davenport (CAN)	
Silver	Franz Plangger (AUT)	
Bronze	Christian Auer (AUT)	

== Medal table ==
Rank	Nation	Gold	Silver	Bronze	Total
1	Germany (GER)	2	0	1	3
2	Canada (CAN)	1	1	0	2
3	Austria (AUT)	0	1	1	2
3	Switzerland (SUI)	0	1	1	2
Totals (4 entries)		3	3	3	9
