= Andi Schmid =

Austrian luger and skeleton racer

Medal record

Skeleton

World Championships
Gold medal – first place	1993 La Plagne	Men
Silver medal – second place	1990 Königssee	Men
Silver medal – second place	1991 Igls	Men
Silver medal – second place	1994 Altenberg	Men

Andi Schmid is an Austrian luger and skeleton racer who competed from the mid-1980s to the early 1990s.

As a skeleton athlete, he won four medals in the men's event at the FIBT World Championships with one gold (1993) and three silvers (1990, 1991, 1994).

Schmid won the overall men's Skeleton World Cup title twice (1986–7, 1987–8).

Currently he works as the Performance Director for the British Skeleton Team.
