= Ursi Walliser =

Swiss skeleton racer

Ursi Walliser (born 17 February 1975) is a Swiss skeleton racer who competed in the late 1990s and early 2000s. She is best known for her best overall seasonal finish of second in the women's Skeleton World Cup championship in 1998–99.
