= Franz Plangger =

Austrian luger and skeleton racer (born 1966)

Medal record

Skeleton

World Championships
Silver medal – second place	1993 La Plagne	Men
Silver medal – second place	1996 Calgary	Men
Bronze medal – third place	1989 St. Moritz	Men
Bronze medal – third place	1994 Altenberg	Men

Franz Plangger (born 2 October 1966) is an Austrian luger and skeleton racer who competed from the late 1980s to the early 2000s.

As a skeleton athlete, he won four medals in the men's event at the FIBT World Championships with two silvers (1993, 1996), and two bronzes (1989, 1994).

Plangger won the men's Skeleton World Cup title in 1992–3.

He also won six World Cup victories in luge between 1993 and 1995.
