= Susan Speiran =

Canadian skeleton racer

Susan Speiran is a Canadian skeleton racer who competed in the 1990s. She is best known for her third place overall Skeleton World Cup title finish in 1997-8.

Speiran married and is now known as Susan Adams. She won the Canadian championship in women's skeleton four times.
