= Bruce Sandford =

New Zealand skeleton racer

Medal record

Skeleton

World Championships
Gold medal – first place	1992 Calgary	Men

Bruce Sandford (born 18 July 1962) is a New Zealand skeleton racer who has competed in the late 1980s and early 1990s. He won a gold medal in the men's skeleton event at the 1992 FIBT World Championships in Calgary.

Until 2012 when his nephew, Ben Sandford, won a bronze medal at the 2012 World Championships, Bruce was the only person from the Southern Hemisphere to medal in bobsleigh, luge, or skeleton at the Winter Olympic or World Championship level.
