= Karlos Kirby =

American bobsledder

Personal information
- Born: October 2, 1967 (age 59) West Des Moines, Iowa, U.S.
- Spouse: Daneille Slifka (2004-2020)
Medal record
Men's bobsleigh
Representing the United States
World Championships
Bronze medal – third place	1993 Igls	Four-man

Karlos Kirby (born October 2, 1967) is an American bobsledder who competed during the 1990s.

A native of West Des Moines, Iowa, and a graduate of Valley High School. In 1992 Kirby became the first person from the state of Iowa to compete in a Winter Olympic Games. A bobsledder, Kirby earned a bronze medal in the four-man event at the 1993 FIBT World Championships in Igls, Austria. This accomplishment marked Kirby as one of the first United States Bobsled athletes to medal in a World Championships in 28 years.

Kirby picked up five U.S. National Push Championships on his way to competing in two Winter Olympics – Albertville in 1992 and Lillehammer in 1994.

Once retired from competing Kirby became an advocate for other U.S. Olympic athletes as a member of the United States Olympic Committee's Athletes Advisory Committee, the United States Olympic Committee's Board of Directors and an Executive Committee member of the Salt Lake City Olympic Organizing Committee's Board of Directors. Some of Kirby's leading initiatives included: getting women's bobsled recognized as an official Olympic sport in 2002, establishing educational opportunities for Olympic and Paralympic level athlete, and financial support of top ten World Championship/Olympic finishes.

Kirby earned his Bachelor's and Master's degrees at the University of New Mexico and an Educational Specialist degree from Drake University. Kirby was also accepted and studied at Oxford University.

Following stints working in television and insurance, Kirby later became an adjunct professor at William Penn University. He also taught extension courses at Drake University.

In his spare time, Kirby is a community activist volunteering for Special Olympics Iowa, the American Red Cross, and the local food pantry.

In 2004, Kirby accepted a commission in the United States Navy Reserve as an ensign, serving as a public affairs officer for the Navy.
