= Jim Shea (skier) =

American cross-country skier (born 1938)

Personal information
- Born: June 22, 1938 (age 88) Lake Placid, New York, U.S.
- Education: University of Denver (BBA)
- Spouse: Judith Butler (m. 1963)

Sport
- Sport: Cross-country skiing

James Edmound Shea Sr. (born June 22, 1938) is an American cross-country skier. He competed in the men's 30 kilometre event at the 1964 Winter Olympics. His father, Jack, and his son, Jimmy, were gold medalists in the 1932 and 2002 Winter Olympics, respectively. He and Jimmy carried the Olympic torch together in the final leg of its 2002 relay.

Shea attended the University of Denver (DU), where he majored in business administration. During his senior year, he was named captain of the school's ski team and earned All-American honors. After graduating in 1961, he was drafted into the United States Army, and was stationed for two years at the U.S. biathlon training center in Anchorage, Alaska. He married Judith Butler, who also graduated from DU, on March 16, 1963.

Shea coached the U.S. Nordic combined ski team in the 1970 World Ski Championships and the U.S. biathlon team in the 1972 Winter Olympics. During the 1980 Winter Olympics, held in his hometown of Lake Placid, he was assistant to the chief of cross-country events.
