= Alexander Müller (skeleton racer) =

Austrian skeleton racer

Medal record

Men's Skeleton

Representing Austria

World Championships
Bronze medal – third place	2000 Igls	Men

Alexander Müller is an Austrian skeleton racer who competed from 1989 to 2000. He won a bronze medal in the men's skeleton event (tied with Jimmy Shea of the United States) at the 2000 FIBT World Championships in Igls.

Müller won the men's overall Skeleton World Cup title in 1996-7.
