= FIBT World Championships 1993 =

Bobsleigh and skeleton competition

1993 World Championships
- Location: Igls, Austria; La Plagne, France

The FIBT World Championships 1993 took place in Igls, Austria (Bobsleigh) and La Plagne, France (Skeleton). This was Igls's fourth time hosting the championships, doing so previously in 1935 (Two-man) and 1963, and 1991 (Skeleton). Meanwhile, La Plagne was hosting its first championship event.

== Selection issue ==
Igls was not the first choice for the bobsleigh part of the championships. In 1989, Cervinia, Italy was chosen over Winterberg, Germany (then in West Germany), but Cervinia later withdrew and Igls and La Plagne were awarded as a substitutes.

== Two man bobsleigh ==
Pos	Team	Time
Gold	Germany (Christoph Langen, Peer Joechel)	
Silver	Switzerland (Gustav Weder, Donat Acklin)	
Bronze	Germany (Wolfgang Hoppe, René Hannemann)	

== Four man bobsleigh ==
Pos	Team	Time
Gold	Switzerland (Gustav Weder, Donat Acklin, Kurt Meier, Domenico Semeraro)	
Silver	Austria (Hubert Schösser, Harald Winkler, Gerhard Redl, Gerhard Haidacher)	
Bronze	United States (Brian Shimer, Bryan Leturgez, Karlos Kirby, Randy Jones)	

The United States earned their first championship medal since 1969.

== Men's skeleton ==
Pos	Athlete	Time
Gold	Andi Schmid (AUT)	
Silver	Franz Plangger (AUT)	
Bronze	Gregor Stähli (SUI)	

== Medal table ==
Rank	Nation	Gold	Silver	Bronze	Total
1	Austria (AUT)	1	2	0	3
2	Switzerland (SUI)	1	1	1	3
3	Germany (GER)	1	0	1	2
4	United States (USA)	0	0	1	1
Totals (4 entries)		3	3	3	9
