= Peer Joechel =

German bobsledder (born 1967)

Medal record

Men's Bobsleigh

Representing Germany

World Championships
Gold medal – first place	1993 Igls	Two-man

Peer Jöchel (born 6 March 1967 in Kiel) is a German bobsledder who competed in the early 1990s. He won a gold medal in the two-man event at the 1993 FIBT World Championships in Igls.
