= Roland Tanner =

Swiss bobsledder

Medal record

Bobsleigh

World Championships
Silver medal – second place	1996 Calgary	Four-man

Roland Tanner is a Swiss bobsledder who competed in the 1990s. He won a silver medal in the four-man event at the 1996 FIBT World Championships in Calgary.
