= Skeleton at the 2022 Winter Olympics =

Skeleton at the XXIV Olympic Winter Games
- Skeleton pictogram
- Venue: Xiaohaituo Bobsleigh and Luge Track
- Dates: 10–12 February 2022
- No. of events: 2 (1 men, 1 women)
- Competitors: 50 from 21 nations (25 men and 25 women)

Skeleton at the 2022 Winter Olympics was held at the Xiaohaituo Bobsleigh and Luge Track in Yanqing District, China. The events took place between 10 and 12 February 2022. A total of two skeleton events were held, one each for men and women.

A total of 50 quotas (25 per gender) were distributed to the sport, the same as the 2018 Winter Olympics. However, five men's quotas were transferred to the women's event to achieve gender equality. A total of 2 events were contested, one each for men and women.

== Qualification ==
A total of 50 quota spots (25 per gender) were available to athletes to compete at the games. In July 2018, the International Olympic Committee moved five men's quotas to the women's event, to achieve gender equality.

== Competition schedule ==
The following was the competition schedule for the two skeleton events.

All times are (UTC+8).

Date	Time	Event
10 February	09:30	Men's singles runs 1 and 2
11 February	09:30	Women's singles runs 1 and 2
11 February	20:20	Men's singles runs 3 and 4
12 February	20:20	Women's singles runs 3 and 4

== Medal summary ==
=== Medal table ===
* Host nation (China)

Rank	Nation	Gold	Silver	Bronze	Total
1	Germany	2	1	0	3
2	Australia	0	1	0	1
3	China*	0	0	1	1
3	Netherlands	0	0	1	1
Totals (4 entries)		2	2	2	6

=== Medalists ===
Event	Gold		Silver		Bronze	
Men's	Christopher Grotheer; Germany	4:01.01	Axel Jungk; Germany	4:01.67	Yan Wengang; China	4:01.77
Women's	Hannah Neise; Germany	4:07.62	Jaclyn Narracott; Australia	4:08.24	Kimberley Bos; Netherlands	4:08.46

== Participating nations ==
A total of 50 athletes from 21 nations (including the IOC's designation of ROC for the Russian Olympic Committee) qualified to participate. American Samoa, Brazil, Puerto Rico and the Virgin Islands made their Olympic sport debuts.

The numbers in parentheses represents the number of participants entered.

- American Samoa (1)
- Australia (2)
- Austria (3)
- Belgium (1)
- Brazil (1)
- Canada (3)
- China (4)
- Czech Republic (1)
- Germany (6)
- Great Britain (4)
- Italy (3)
- Latvia (3)
- Netherlands (1)
- Puerto Rico (1)
- ROC (6)
- South Korea (3)
- Spain (1)
- Switzerland (1)
- Ukraine (1)
- United States (3)
- Virgin Islands (1)
