= Skeleton at the 2014 Winter Olympics =

Skeleton at the XXII Olympic Winter Games
- Venue: Sliding Center Sanki, Krasnaya Polyana, Russia
- Dates: 13–15 February 2014
- Competitors: 47 from 17 nations

Skeleton at the 2014 Winter Olympics was held at the Sliding Center Sanki near Krasnaya Polyana, Russia. The events were held between 13 and 15 February 2014. A total of two skeleton events were held.

== Competition schedule ==
The following is the competition schedule for all events.

All times are (UTC+4).

Date	Time	Event
13 February	11:30	Women's singles runs 1 and 2
14 February	16:30	Men's singles runs 1 and 2
14 February	16:30	Women's singles runs 3 and 4
15 February	18:45	Men's singles runs 3 and 4

== Medal summary ==
=== Medal table ===
* Host nation (Russia)

Rank	Nation	Gold	Silver	Bronze	Total
1	Russia*	1	0	1	2
2	Great Britain	1	0	0	1
3	United States	0	1	1	2
4	Latvia	0	1	0	1
Totals (4 entries)		2	2	2	6

=== Medalist ===
Event	Gold		Silver		Bronze	
Men's	Aleksandr Tretyakov ^{[a]} Russia	3:44.29	Martins Dukurs; Latvia	3:45.10	Matthew Antoine; United States	3:47.26
Women's	Lizzy Yarnold; Great Britain	3:52.89	Noelle Pikus-Pace; United States	3:53.86	Elena Nikitina ^{[b]} Russia	3:54.30

- ^{a} On 22 November 2017, gold medalist Aleksandr Tretyakov was stripped of his gold medal. On 1 February 2018, his results were restored as a result of the successful appeal.
- ^{b} On 22 November 2017, bronze medalist Elena Nikitina was stripped of her medal. On 1 February 2018, her results were restored as a result of the successful appeal.

== Qualification ==
A total of 50 quota spots were available to athletes to compete at the games. A maximum 30 men and 20 women might qualify. The qualification was based on the world rankings of 19 January 2014.

== Participating nations ==
47 athletes from 17 nations participated, with number of athletes in parentheses.

- Australia (3)
- Austria (3)
- Canada (4)
- Germany (5)
- Great Britain (4)
- Greece (1)
- Ireland (1)
- Italy (1)
- Japan (3)
- Latvia (3)
- New Zealand (2)
- Romania (2)
- Russia (6)
- South Korea (2)
- Spain (1)
- Switzerland (1)
- United States (5)
