= Michelle Kelly (skeleton racer) =

Canadian skeleton racer

Personal information
- Born: November 7, 1974 (age 51) Fort St. John, British Columbia, Canada
- Height: 1.64 m (5 ft 5 in)
- Weight: 64 kg (141 lb)

Sport
- Sport: Skeleton
- Club: Rocky Mountain Skeleton Club
Medal record
Skeleton
Representing Canada
World Championships
Gold medal – first place	2003 Nagano	Women
Silver medal – second place	2008 Altenberg	Mixed team
Bronze medal – third place	2005 Calgary	Women

Michelle Kelly (born November 7, 1974) is a Canadian former skeleton racer who competed from 1994 to 2013. A two-time Olympian, Kelly is largely considered to be one of the pioneers of the sport of Women's Skeleton. Originally an elite gymnast, she was recruited for her explosive power to the Canadian Women's National Bobsleigh Team as a brakeman, competing from 1994 to 1999. In 1995 Kelly started sliding Skeleton and competing in both sports. When Women's Skeleton and Bobsled were both named to make their debut at the 2002 Winter Olympics in Salt Lake City, Kelly chose Skeleton. She finished 10th at those 2002 Games, and went on to earn the Olympic alternate position at the 2006 Torino Olympics, and another Olympic birth at the 2010 Winter Olympics, finishing 13th. Kelly won a complete set of medals at the FIBT World Championships with a gold in 2003 (women's skeleton), a silver in 2008 (mixed bobsleigh-skeleton team), and a bronze in 2005 (women's skeleton), as well as taking the women's Skeleton World Cup overall title in 2002-3.

== Accolades ==
Michelle Kelly's Skeleton accomplishments include 33 World Cup Medals & 22 International medals throughout her Skeleton career, Bronze at the 2000 Winter Goodwill Games, 2003 Continental Champion, 2000 North American Champion, and 4x Canadian Champion. She still holds world downtime records at the Calgary, AB and Nagano, Japan tracks, and the start record at the old Lake Placid Skeleton Track. Previous downtime records held: Whistler, Canada; Park City, Utah; Lake Placid, NY; Lillehammer, Norway; Winterberg, Germany; Konigssee, Germany, and St. Moritz, Switzerland. Michelle was voted Alberta Athlete of the Year - 2003 by the Alberta Sport, Recreation & Wildlife Foundation; Female Athlete of the Year - 2003 by the Grande Prairie Herald Tribune; Inducted to the Wall of Honor – June 2003 at Grande Prairie Composite High School; and voted Female Athlete of the Year - 2001/02 season by the Alberta Skeleton Association.

Kelly retired in 2013 when she discovered she had Lyme Disease, and had been battling it while still competing since 2010. Born in Fort St. John, British Columbia, Kelly now lives in Calgary.

== Broadcasting ==
Michelle Kelly's Global Media experience includes:

=== Cast - Ice Racer Showdown- Corkscrew Media ===
==== Jan 2015 – Jan 2016 ====
A new reality show that pits everyday drivers in a series of head-to-head challenges on an ice course. Produced by Corkscrew Media for CMT.

=== Skeleton Commentator- IBSF - International Bobsleigh & Skeleton Federation ===
==== Nov 2013 – Nov 2013 ====
Live Skeleton commentary of the men's and women's World Cup Race in Calgary, Alberta, Canada

Broadcast live on - NBC/Universal Sports (USA), Sports Net (Canada), live stream/video on demand on FIBT's YouTube channel (https://www.youtube.com/user/bobskeletv)

=== On-camera Host for Science of Sport- CBC Television ===
==== 2003 – 2003 ====
Hosted segment on the three sliding sports; Skeleton, Bobsleigh and Luge and how they utilize the technology of the Icehouse to benefit their performance

== Other media ==
- Say Yes To The Dress Canada – W Network (Corus Entertainment), June, 2015

- Featured on - CBC, TSN, CTV, ETalk, CANADA AM, the SCORE, NBC, Breakfast TV, ShawTV, Sports Net

- ShawTV hosting/camera workshop.

- CTV job shadowing

- Wipeout Canada contestant - 2010

- National commercials for - RBC, VISA & Dairy Farmers of Canada

- Featured in - Time magazine, Sports Illustrated, Macleans, Impact, Player magazine (cover launch edition)

- Athlete profile on Cheerios and Lucky Charms Olympic edition cereal boxes 2009/2010 (General Mills "Cheer Campaign")

- Activia Green Team healthy eating media program

- Documentaries, sport/Olympic profiles, hosting and reporting, stunt and extra work for film

- Guest host at Sun FM radio Grande Prairie (news)

- Michael Berry; Media Actors Studio & Acting Seminar

- Patty Falconer Professional Film & TV Acting Adult 1

- NUTV; Sports Reporting

== Controversy ==
In 2009, while qualifying for the World Cup selection, Michelle Kelly was disqualified after post-race testing called into question the legality of her race runners per the International Bobsleigh and Skeleton Federation rules. An appeal was set up, and she was ultimately proven innocent and regained her place on the team.
