= Philippe Cavoret =

French skeleton racer (born 1968)

Philippe Cavoret (born 11 January 1968 in Aix-les-Bains, Savoie) is a French skeleton racer who competed from 1992 to 2006. Competing in two Winter Olympics, he earned his best finish of 14th in the men's skeleton event at Turin in 2006.

Cavoret's best finish at the FIBT World Championships was seventh twice in the men's skeleton event (2003, 2005). He retired after the 2006 Winter Olympics.

== Bibliography ==
- 2002 men's skeleton results
- 2006 men's skeleton results
- FIBT profile
- Skeletonsport.com profile
