= Skeleton at the 2006 Winter Olympics =

Skeleton at the XX Olympic Winter Games
- Venue: Cesana Pariol
- Dates: 16–17 February 2006
- Competitors: 42 from 21 nations

The skeleton competition at the 2006 Winter Olympic Games was held at Cesana Pariol in Cesana, Italy on February 16 (women's) and February 17 (men's).

== Medal summary ==
=== Medal table ===
Rank	Nation	Gold	Silver	Bronze	Total
1	Canada	1	1	1	3
2	Switzerland	1	0	1	2
3	Great Britain	0	1	0	1
Totals (3 entries)		2	2	2	6

=== Events ===
Event	Gold		Silver		Bronze	
Men's	Duff Gibson; Canada	1:55.88	Jeff Pain; Canada	1:56.14	Gregor Stähli; Switzerland	1:56.80
Women's	Maya Pedersen-Bieri; Switzerland	1:59.83	Shelley Rudman; Great Britain	2:01.06	Mellisa Hollingsworth-Richards; Canada	2:01.41

== Participating NOCs ==
Twenty-one nations competed in the skeleton events at Torino.

- Australia (2)
- Austria (2)
- Bermuda (1)
- Canada (5)
- Croatia (1)
- France (1)
- Germany (4)
- Great Britain (3)
- Ireland (1)
- Italy (2)
- Japan (3)
- South Korea (1)
- Latvia (1)
- Lebanon (1)
- Norway (1)
- New Zealand (2)
- Poland (1)
- South Africa (1)
- Russia (2)
- Switzerland (3)
- United States (4)
