= FIBT World Championships 2005 =

Bobsleigh and skeleton competition

2005 World Championships
- Location: Calgary, Alberta, Canada

The FIBT World Championships 2005 took place in Calgary, Alberta, Canada for the fourth time, doing so previously in 1992 (Skeleton), 1996, and 2001 (Women's bobsleigh and men's and women's skeleton).

== Bobsleigh ==
=== Two man ===
| Pos | Team | Athletes | Time | Behind |
|---|---|---|---|---|
| 1st place, gold medalist(s) | Canada | Pierre Lueders; Lascelles Brown | 3:39.38 | |
| 2nd place, silver medalist(s) | Germany | André Lange; Kevin Kuske | 3:39.52 | +0.14 |
| 3rd place, bronze medalist(s) | Switzerland | Martin Annen; Beat Hefti | 3:39.70 | +0.32 |

=== Four man ===
| Pos | Team | Athletes | Time | Behind |
|---|---|---|---|---|
| 1st place, gold medalist(s) | Germany | André Lange; René Hoppe; Kevin Kuske; Martin Putze | 3:43.53 | |
| 2nd place, silver medalist(s) | Russia | Alexander Zubkov; Sergey Golubev; Aleskey Seliverstov; Dmitriy Stepushkin | 3:43.83 | +0.30 |
| 3rd place, bronze medalist(s) | Canada | Pierre Lueders; Ken Kotyk; Morgan Alexander; Lascelles Brown | 3:43.86 | +0.33 |

=== Two woman ===
| Pos | Team | Athletes | Time | Behind |
|---|---|---|---|---|
| 1st place, gold medalist(s) | Germany | Sandra Kiriasis; Anja Schneiderheinze | 3:43.01 | |
| 2nd place, silver medalist(s) | Great Britain | Nicola Minichiello; Jackie Davies | 3:43.29 | +0.28 |
| 3rd place, bronze medalist(s) | United States | Shauna Rohbock; Valerie Fleming | 3:43.73 | +0.72 |

== Skeleton ==
=== Men ===
| Pos | Athlete | Time |
|---|---|---|
| 1st place, gold medalist(s) | Jeff Pain (CAN) | |
| 2nd place, silver medalist(s) | Gregor Stähli (SUI) | |
| 3rd place, bronze medalist(s) | Duff Gibson (CAN) | |

=== Women ===
| Pos | Athlete | Time |
|---|---|---|
| 1st place, gold medalist(s) | Maya Pedersen (SUI) | |
| 2nd place, silver medalist(s) | Noelle Pikus-Pace (USA) | |
| 3rd place, bronze medalist(s) | Michelle Kelly (CAN) | |

== Medal table ==
| Rank | Nation | Gold | Silver | Bronze | Total |
|---|---|---|---|---|---|
| 1 | Germany (GER) | 2 | 1 | 0 | 3 |
| 2 | Canada (CAN) | 2 | 0 | 3 | 5 |
| 3 | Switzerland (SUI) | 1 | 1 | 1 | 3 |
| 4 | United States (USA) | 0 | 1 | 1 | 2 |
| 5 | Great Britain (GBR) | 0 | 1 | 0 | 1 |
| 5 | Russia (RUS) | 0 | 1 | 0 | 1 |
| Totals (6 entries) | | 5 | 5 | 5 | 15 |
