= Mellisa Hollingsworth =

Canadian skeleton racer (born 1980)

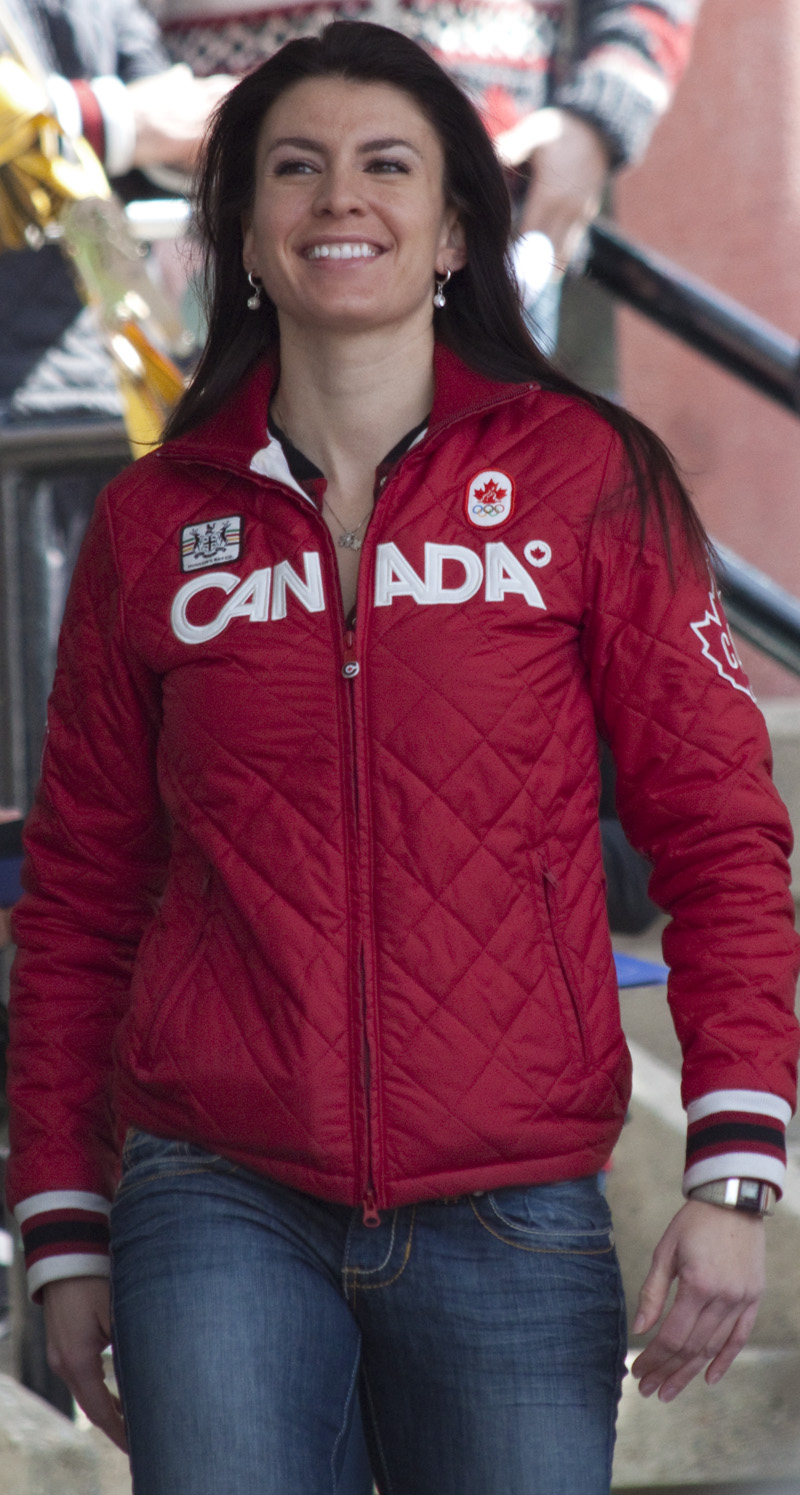
- Hollingsworth in Calgary (2010)

Personal information
- Born: October 4, 1980 (age 45) Lacombe, Alberta, Canada
- Website: MelHollingsworth.ca
Medal record
Skeleton
Representing Canada
Olympic Games
Bronze medal – third place	2006 Turin	Women
World Championships
Silver medal – second place	2000 Igls	Women
Silver medal – second place	2012 Lake Placid	Women
Bronze medal – third place	2011 Königssee	Women
Bronze medal – third place	2011 Königssee	Mixed team
Bronze medal – third place	2012 Lake Placid	Mixed team

Mellisa Hollingsworth (born October 4, 1980) is a retired Canadian athlete who competed from 1995 to 2014. She won the bronze medal in the women's skeleton event at the 2006 Winter Olympics in Turin.

Hollingsworth also won a silver in the women's skeleton event at the 2000 FIBT World Championships in Igls, Austria. She won the women's Skeleton World Cup overall title both in 2005–06 and in 2009–10.

Hollingsworth is the cousin of Ryan Davenport, who won three medals in the men's skeleton event at the FIBT World Championships in the late 1990s.

Hollingsworth participated in the 2010 Winter Olympics in Vancouver, British Columbia. After three runs, she was in second position behind Amy Williams of Great Britain. However, in the final run, despite a personal best start time of 4.93 seconds, Hollingsworth fell behind and ended up finishing fifth overall.

Hollingsworth retired after participating in the 2014 Winter Olympic Games in Sochi, Russia.

In summer 2018, Hollingsworth competed on The Amazing Race Canada: Heroes Edition with barrel racer Nancy Csabay. They finished in 5th place.
