= Shaun Boyle =

Australian skeleton racer (born 1971)

Shaun Boyle (born 30 January 1971) is an Australian skeleton racer who competed from 2001 to 2006. He finished 22nd in the men's skeleton event at the 2006 Winter Olympics in Turin.

Boyle's best finish at the FIBT World Championships was 22nd in the men's skeleton event at Calgary in 2005.

Since 2006, Boyle has competed for Australia in bobsleigh.
