= Martin Thaler =

Austrian skeleton racer

Martin Thaler is an Austrian skeleton racer who competed in the early 1990s. He is best known for his third place overall finish in the 1991-92 men's Skeleton World Cup.
