= Michael Voudouris =

Greek skeleton racer (born 1960)

Michael Voudouris (born March 26, 1960) is an American-born Greek skeleton racer.

== Career ==
Competing in the early 2000s, he finished 23rd in the men's skeleton event at the 2002 Winter Olympics in Salt Lake City.

Voudouris also is a photojournalist and an emergency medical technician. During the September 11, 2001 attacks in New York City, he served as a public safety official for which he earned the AHEPA Medal of Freedom the following year.

In 2005, Voudouris took part in the Rolex Transatlantic Sailboat Race from New York City to England.
