= FIBT World Championships 1994 =

Bobsleigh and skeleton competition

1994 World Championships
- Location: Altenberg, Germany

The FIBT World Championships 1994 took place in Altenberg, Germany for the second time, having hosted the event previously in 1991 (Bobsleigh). This was an extraordinary event since skeleton was not included on the program at the 1994 Winter Olympics in Lillehammer, Norway.

== Men's skeleton ==
Pos	Athlete	Time
Gold	Gregor Stähli (SUI)	
Silver	Andi Schmid (AUT)	
Bronze	Franz Plangger (AUT)	

== Medal table ==
Rank	Nation	Gold	Silver	Bronze	Total
1	Switzerland (SUI)	1	0	0	1
2	Austria (AUT)	0	1	1	2
Totals (2 entries)		1	1	1	3
