= Lindsay Alcock =

Canadian skeleton racer

Medal record

Skeleton

Representing Canada

World Championships
Silver medal – second place	2004 Königssee	Women

Lindsay Alcock (born October 6, 1977) is a Canadian skeleton racer who has competed since 1998. She won a silver medal in the women's skeleton event at the 2004 FIBT World Championships in Königssee.

Competing in two Winter Olympics, Alcock earned her best finish of sixth in the women's skeleton event at Salt Lake City in 2002. She won the women's Skeleton World Cup overall title in 2003-4.

A native of Calgary, Alberta, Alcock also does motivational speaking.
