= Alex Coomber =

British skeleton racer

Personal information
- Full name: Alexandra Andrea Coomber
- Born: Alexandra Andrea Hamilton; 28 December 1973 (age 52) Antwerpen, Belgium
Medal record
Women's skeleton
Representing Great Britain
Olympic Games
Bronze medal – third place	2002 Salt Lake City	Women
World Championships
Silver medal – second place	2001 Calgary	Women

Alexandra Andrea Coomber (née Hamilton; born 28 December 1973) is a British skeleton racer who competed in the late 1990s and early 2000s. She won the bronze medal in the women's skeleton event at the 2002 Winter Olympics in Salt Lake City, while competing with a broken wrist, having broken it in training 10 days prior to her race.

Coomber, who married in 2000, holds many records for achievements in the field of skeleton, won the first British Championship she entered, and was unbeaten at all other British championships. She won the women's Skeleton World Cup title three years in a row (1999–2000, 2000–1, 2001–2), a record listed in the Guinness Book of Records. Coomber was the first British athlete to win three winter World Cup series. During her career, she set track records at La Plagne, Lake Placid, and Nagano. She had been an intelligence officer of the Royal Air Force, and retired from competing in the skeleton in order to return to her previous profession. Coomber previously studied at Hertford College, Oxford.

Coomber also won a silver medal in the women's skeleton event at the 2001 FIBT World Championships in Calgary.
