= Martin Rettl =

Austrian skeleton racer (born 1973)

Personal information
- Nationality: Austrian
- Born: 25 November 1973 (age 52) Innsbruck, Austria
- Height: 183 cm (6 ft 0 in)
- Weight: 72 kg (159 lb)

Sport
- Country: Austria
- Sport: Skeleton
Medal record
Men's skeleton
Representing Austria
Olympic Games
Silver medal – second place	2002 Salt Lake City	Men
World Championships
Gold medal – first place	2001 Calgary	Men

Martin Rettl (born 25 November 1973) is an Austrian skeleton racer who competed from 1989 to 2006. Competing in two Winter Olympics, he won a silver medal in the men's skeleton event at the games in Salt Lake City in 2002.

Rettl also won a gold medal in the men's skeleton event at the 2001 FIBT World Championships in Calgary. His best overall Skeleton World Cup seasonal finish was third in the men's event in 2001–2.

Retiring from skeleton after the 2006 Winter Olympics in Turin, Martin is an air traffic controller in Innsbruck, Austria and coaches sliders from Belgium, New Zealand and Spain in the IBSF World Cup.

== Career results ==
=== World Championships ===
Event	Men
(Canada) 2005 Calgary	12th
