= Christian Auer =

Austrian skeleton racer (born 1966)

Medal record

Skeleton

World Championships
Gold medal – first place	1991 Igls	Men
Silver medal – second place	1989 St. Moritz	Men
Silver medal – second place	1995 Lillehammer	Men
Bronze medal – third place	1992 Calgary	Men
Bronze medal – third place	1996 Calgary	Men

Christian Auer (born 4 April 1966) is an Austrian skeleton racer who competed from the late 1980s to the 2002 Winter Olympics. He won five medals in the men's event at the FIBT World Championships with one gold (1991), two silvers (1989, 1995), and two bronzes (1992, 1996).

Auer also finished 12th in the men's skeleton at Salt Lake City in 2002.

He won the overall men's Skeleton World Cup title five times (1989–90, 1990–1, 1991–2, 1993–4, 1994–5).

Auer became a skeleton coach for the Canadian national team after the 2002 games.
