= FIBT World Championships 1992 =

Bobsleigh and skeleton competition

1992 World Championships
- Location: Calgary, Alberta, Canada

The FIBT World Championships 1992 took place in Calgary, Alberta, Canada. This was Calgary's first time hosting a championship event. It was also an extraordinary event since men's skeleton was not included in the program of the 1992 Winter Olympics in Albertville, France.

== Men's skeleton ==
Pos	Athlete	Time
Gold	Bruce Sandford (NZL)	
Silver	Gregor Stähli (SUI)	
Bronze	Christian Auer (AUT)	

As of 2009, Sandford is the only person from the Southern Hemisphere to medal in bobsleigh, luge, or skeleton in a World Championship or Winter Olympic level.

== Medal table ==
Rank	Nation	Gold	Silver	Bronze	Total
1	New Zealand (NZL)	1	0	0	1
2	Switzerland (SUI)	0	1	0	1
3	Austria (AUT)	0	0	1	1
Totals (3 entries)		1	1	1	3
