= Kazuhiro Koshi =

Japanese skeleton racer (born 1964)

Kazuhiro Koshi (越 和宏, Koshi Kazuhiro, born December 23, 1964) is a Japanese skeleton racer who has competed since 1991. Competing in three Winter Olympics, he earned his best finish of eighth in the men's skeleton event at Salt Lake City in 2002. He was the oldest member of the Japanese team at the 2010 Winter Olympics and, because of this, was referred to in media reports as, "the hope of the middle class."

== Athletic career ==
Originally a shot putter, Koshi's first attempt at sliding sports fell short when he failed to make the Japanese bobsleigh team for the 1992 Winter Olympics in Albertville, France. He later took up skeleton, a new sport in Japan, and became the first Japanese athlete to win a World Cup event in the sport at Nagano in 1999.

Koshi also competed in the FIBT World Championships, earning his best finish of fourth in the men's skeleton event at Nagano in 2003.

His best overall seasonal men's Skeleton World Cup finish was second twice (1997-8, 2000-1).

After skeleton was added to the Olympic roster in 2002 in Salt Lake City, Utah for the first time in 54 years, Koshi qualified and placed eighth. He made the Japanese team again for the 2006 Winter Olympics in Turin, Italy, placing 11th. Continuing to compete internationally at an age when many Olympic athletes retire from competition, Koshi gained a measure of fame at home, and was referred to in the media as, "the hope of the middle-aged."

Koshi qualified for his third Olympics, the 2010 Games in Vancouver, British Columbia, Canada, and competed in the men's skeleton event there, but finished in 20th place. He was the oldest member of Japan's team at the Games. It was expected to be his last Olympics, though Koshi told reporters that he would continue to do skeleton, "for my health," and suggested he might continue to compete in Japanese National Championships in the sport. He also is working to create a governing body for the sport in Japan.

== Other sources ==
- Kazuhiro Koshi at the International Bobsleigh & Skeleton Federation
- 2006 men's skeleton results (todor66.com)
