= Chris Soule =

American skeleton racer (born 1973)

Medal record

Skeleton

Representing the United States

World Championships
Silver medal – second place	2003 Nagano	Men
Bronze medal – third place	1997 Lake Placid	Men

Chris Soule (born February 5, 1973) is an American skeleton racer who competed from 1993 to 2006. He won two medals in the men's skeleton event at the FIBT World Championships with a silver in 2003 and a bronze in 1997. Soule also won the overall men's 2002–3 Skeleton World Cup title with multiple World Cup victories that season. He is the 3-time U.S. National Champion and remains one of the most decorated Skeleton athletes in the history of the sport.

Competing in two Winter Olympic Games, Soule earned his best finish of seventh at Salt Lake City in 2002, during which he was nominated for the Olympic Spirit Award as the U.S. Skeleton Team Captain. He retired after the 2006 Winter Olympics in Turin.
