= Skeleton World Cup =

Annual skeleton bobsled competition

The Skeleton World Cup season is a yearly competition first organized by the International Bobsleigh and Skeleton Federation since 1986–87. The women's version of this event debuted in 1996–97.

== Overall results ==
=== Men ===
Season	Winner	Runner-up	Third place
1986/87	(Austria) Andi Schmid	(Switzerland) Alain Wicki	(Austria) Christian Auer
1987/88	(Austria) Andi Schmid (2)	(Switzerland) Alain Wicki	(Austria) Christian Auer
1988/89	(Switzerland) Alain Wicki	(Austria) Christian Auer	(Austria) Andi Schmid
1989/90	(Austria) Christian Auer	(Switzerland) Urs Vercoli	(Austria) Franz Plangger
1990/91	(Austria) Christian Auer	(Austria) Michael Grünberger	(Austria) Andi Schmid
1991/92	(Austria) Christian Auer	(Switzerland) Gregor Stähli	(Austria) Martin Thaler
1992/93	(Austria) Franz Plangger	(Austria) Christian Auer	(Switzerland) Gregor Stähli
1993/94	(Austria) Christian Auer	(Austria) Andi Schmid	(Austria) Franz Plangger
1994/95	(Austria) Christian Auer (5)	(Austria) Franz Plangger	(Austria) Alexander Müller
1995/96	(Canada) Ryan Davenport	(Austria) Michael Grünberger	(Austria) Christian Auer
1996/97	(Austria) Alexander Müller	(Canada) Ryan Davenport	(Germany) Willi Schneider
1997/98	(Germany) Willi Schneider	(Japan) Kazuhiro Koshi	(Germany) Andy Böhme
1998/99	(Germany) Andy Böhme	(Canada) Ryan Davenport	(United States) Jim Shea
1999/00	(Germany) Andy Böhme (2)	(United States) Chris Soule	(United Kingdom) Kristan Bromley
2000/01	(United States) Lincoln DeWitt	(Japan) Kazuhiro Koshi	(United States) Jim Shea
2001/02	(Switzerland) Gregor Stähli	(United States) Chris Soule	(Austria) Martin Rettl
2002/03	(United States) Chris Soule	(Canada) Jeff Pain	(Japan) Kazuhiro Koshi
2003/04	(United Kingdom) Kristan Bromley	(Canada) Duff Gibson	(Germany) Frank Kleber
2004/05	(Canada) Jeff Pain	(United States) Chris Soule	(Canada) Duff Gibson
2005/06	(Canada) Jeff Pain (2)	(Switzerland) Gregor Stähli	(United States) Eric Bernotas
2006/07	(United States) Zach Lund	(United States) Eric Bernotas	(Russia) Aleksandr Tretyakov
2007/08	(United Kingdom) Kristan Bromley (2)	(Canada) Jon Montgomery	(United States) Zach Lund
2008/09	(Russia) Aleksandr Tretyakov	(Germany) Florian Grassl	(Germany) Frank Rommel
2009/10	(Latvia) Martins Dukurs	(Germany) Frank Rommel	(Germany) Sandro Stielicke
2010/11	(Latvia) Martins Dukurs	(Germany) Sandro Stielicke	(Germany) Frank Rommel
2011/12	(Latvia) Martins Dukurs	(Germany) Frank Rommel	(Latvia) Tomass Dukurs
2012/13	(Latvia) Martins Dukurs	(Latvia) Tomass Dukurs	(Germany) Alexander Kröckel
2013/14	(Latvia) Martins Dukurs	(Latvia) Tomass Dukurs	(United States) Matthew Antoine
2014/15	(Latvia) Martins Dukurs	(Latvia) Tomass Dukurs	(Germany) Axel Jungk
2015/16	(Latvia) Martins Dukurs	(South Korea) Yun Sung-bin	(Latvia) Tomass Dukurs
2016/17	(Latvia) Martins Dukurs	(South Korea) Yun Sung-bin	(Russia) Aleksandr Tretyakov
2017/18	(South Korea) Yun Sung-bin	(Germany) Axel Jungk	(Latvia) Tomass Dukurs
2018/19	(Russia) Aleksandr Tretyakov (2)	(South Korea) Yun Sung-bin	(Latvia) Martins Dukurs
2019/20	(Latvia) Martins Dukurs	(Russia) Aleksandr Tretyakov	(South Korea) Yun Sung-bin
2020/21	(Latvia) Martins Dukurs	(Germany) Alexander Gassner	(Latvia) Tomass Dukurs
2021/22	(Latvia) Martins Dukurs (11)	(Germany) Axel Jungk	(Germany) Christopher Grotheer
2022/23	(Germany) Christopher Grotheer	(United Kingdom) Matt Weston	(United Kingdom) Marcus Wyatt
2023/24	(United Kingdom) Matt Weston	(Germany) Christopher Grotheer	(China) Yin Zheng
2024/25	(United Kingdom) Matt Weston	(United Kingdom) Marcus Wyatt	(Germany) Christopher Grotheer
2025/26	(United Kingdom) Matt Weston (3)	(China) Yin Zheng	(United Kingdom) Marcus Wyatt

- Medals:

Rank	Nation	Gold	Silver	Bronze	Total
1	Latvia	11	3	5	19
2	Austria	9	6	10	25
3	Great Britain	5	2	3	10
4	Germany	4	8	10	22
5	Canada	3	5	1	9
6	United States	3	4	5	12
7	Switzerland	2	5	1	8
8	Russia	2	1	2	5
9	South Korea	1	3	1	5
10	Japan	0	2	1	3
11	China	0	1	1	2
Totals (11 entries)		40	40	40	120

=== Women ===
Season	Winner	Runner-up	Third place
1996/97	(Germany) Steffi Hanzlik	(Canada) Michelle Kelly	(Switzerland) Maya Bieri
1997/98	(Switzerland) Maya Bieri	(Germany) Steffi Hanzlik	(Canada) Susan Speiran
1998/99	(Germany) Steffi Hanzlik (2)	(Switzerland) Ursi Walliser	(Switzerland) Maya Bieri
1999/00	(United Kingdom) Alex Coomber	(Switzerland) Maya Bieri	(Canada) Michelle Kelly
2000/01	(United Kingdom) Alex Coomber	(Germany) Steffi Hanzlik	(Switzerland) Maya Bieri
2001/02	(United Kingdom) Alex Coomber (3)	(Switzerland) Maya Bieri	(Canada) Lindsay Alcock
2002/03	(Canada) Michelle Kelly	(Canada) Lindsay Alcock	(United States) Tristan Gale
2003/04	(Canada) Lindsay Alcock	(Germany) Diana Sartor	(Canada) Michelle Kelly
2004/05	(United States) Noelle Pikus-Pace	(Switzerland) Maya Bieri	(Germany) Kerstin Jürgens
2005/06	(Canada) Mellisa Hollingsworth	(Switzerland) Maya Bieri	(Germany) Diana Sartor
2006/07	(United States) Katie Uhlaender	(United States) Noelle Pikus-Pace	(Canada) Michelle Kelly
2007/08	(United States) Katie Uhlaender (2)	(Canada) Michelle Kelly	(Canada) Mellisa Hollingsworth
2008/09	(Germany) Marion Trott	(United Kingdom) Shelley Rudman	(United States) Katie Uhlaender
2009/10	(Canada) Mellisa Hollingsworth (2)	(United Kingdom) Shelley Rudman	(Germany) Kerstin Szymkowiak
2010/11	(Germany) Anja Huber	(United Kingdom) Shelley Rudman	(Canada) Mellisa Hollingsworth
2011/12	(United Kingdom) Shelley Rudman	(Germany) Marion Thees	(Germany) Anja Huber
2012/13	(Germany) Marion Thees (2)	(Germany) Anja Huber	(United States) Katie Uhlaender
2013/14	(United Kingdom) Elizabeth Yarnold	(United States) Noelle Pikus-Pace	(United Kingdom) Shelley Rudman
2014/15	(Austria) Janine Flock	(United Kingdom) Elizabeth Yarnold	(Germany) Tina Hermann
2015/16	(Germany) Tina Hermann	(Germany) Jacqueline Lölling	(Canada) Jane Channell
2016/17	(Germany) Jacqueline Lölling	(Germany) Tina Hermann	(Canada) Mirela Rahneva
2017/18	(Germany) Jacqueline Lölling	(Germany) Tina Hermann	(Canada) Elisabeth Vathje
2018/19	(Russia) Elena Nikitina	(Germany) Tina Hermann	(Canada) Mirela Rahneva
2019/20	(Germany) Jacqueline Lölling (3)	(Austria) Janine Flock	(Russia) Elena Nikitina
2020/21	(Austria) Janine Flock (2)	(Germany) Tina Hermann	(Netherlands) Kimberley Bos
2021/22	(Netherlands) Kimberley Bos	(Austria) Janine Flock	(Russia) Elena Nikitina
2022/23	(Germany) Tina Hermann (2)	(Netherlands) Kimberley Bos	(Canada) Mirela Rahneva
2023/24	(Netherlands) Kimberley Bos (2)	(Belgium) Kim Meylemans	(Italy) Valentina Margaglio
2024/25	(Austria) Janine Flock (3)	(Netherlands) Kimberley Bos	(Germany) Hannah Neise
2025/26	(Belgium) Kim Meylemans	(Germany) Jacqueline Pfeifer	(United Kingdom) Tabitha Stoecker

- Medals:

Rank	Nation	Gold	Silver	Bronze	Total
1	Germany	10	11	6	27
2	Great Britain	5	4	2	11
3	Canada	4	3	12	19
4	United States	3	2	3	8
5	Austria	3	2	0	5
6	Netherlands	2	2	1	5
7	Switzerland	1	5	3	9
8	Belgium	1	1	0	2
9	Russia	1	0	2	3
10	Italy	0	0	1	1
Totals (10 entries)		30	30	30	90

=== Mixed team ===
Season	Winner	Runner-up	Third place
2025/26	Great Britain (GBR 1)	Germany (GER 1)	United States (USA 1)

- Medals:

Rank	Nation	Gold	Silver	Bronze	Total
1	Great Britain	1	0	0	1
2	Germany	0	1	0	1
3	United States	0	0	1	1
Totals (3 entries)		1	1	1	3

== All-time overall results ==
Rank	Nation	Gold	Silver	Bronze	Total
1	Germany	14	20	16	50
2	Austria	12	8	10	30
3	Great Britain	11	6	5	22
4	Latvia	11	3	5	19
5	Canada	7	8	13	28
6	United States	6	6	9	21
7	Switzerland	3	10	4	17
8	Russia	3	1	4	8
9	Netherlands	2	2	1	5
10	South Korea	1	3	1	5
11	Belgium	1	1	0	2
12	Japan	0	2	1	3
13	China	0	1	1	2
14	Italy	0	0	1	1
Totals (14 entries)		71	71	71	213

Rank	Nation	Gold	Silver	Bronze	Total
1	(Latvia) Martins Dukurs	11	0	1	12
2	(Austria) Christian Auer	5	2	3	10
3	(Germany) Jacqueline Pfeifer (Lölling)	3	2	0	5
3	(Austria) Janine Flock	3	2	0	5
5	(United Kingdom) Matt Weston	3	1	0	4
6	(United Kingdom) Alex Coomber	3	0	0	3
7	(Germany) Tina Hermann	2	4	1	7
8	(Netherlands) Kimberley Bos	2	2	1	5
9	(Germany) Steffi Hanzlik	2	2	0	4
10	(Russia) Aleksandr Tretyakov	2	1	2	5
10	(Austria) Andi Schmid	2	1	2	5

== Record of victories and podiums ==
: after 2025/2026 season

(NB: some results are based without official sources because archives do not exist to date. Results are missing for the first two World Cups in 1987 and 1988)

=== Men ===
Victories
Rank	Name	Victories
1	(Latvia) Martins Dukurs	61
2	(Russia) Aleksandr Tretyakov	22
3	(United Kingdom) Matt Weston	14
4	(South Korea) Yun Sung-bin	10
4	(Switzerland) Gregor Stähli	10
4	(Germany) Christopher Grotheer	10
7	(Austria) Christian Auer	9
7	(Canada) Jeff Pain	9
9	(Germany) Frank Rommel	7
10	(United Kingdom) Kristan Bromley	6
10	(Austria) Franz Plangger	6
10	(United States) Zach Lund	6
10	(Canada) Ryan Davenport	6

Podiums
Rank	Name	1st	2nd	3rd	Total
1	(Latvia) Martins Dukurs	61	21	8	90
2	(Russia) Aleksandr Tretyakov	22	26	20	68
3	(South Korea) Yun Sung-bin	10	15	12	37
4	(Latvia) Tomass Dukurs	1	16	14	31
5	(Germany) Christopher Grotheer	10	8	11	29
6	(United Kingdom) Matt Weston	14	7	6	27
7	(Switzerland) Gregor Stähli	10	9	6	25
8	(Austria) Christian Auer	9	9	5	23
9	(Canada) Jeff Pain	9	7	6	22
9	(Germany) Frank Rommel	7	6	9	22
11	(Germany) Axel Jungk	3	10	8	21

=== Women ===
Victories
Rank	Name	Victories
1	(Germany) Tina Hermann	19
2	(Austria) Janine Flock	14
2	(Germany) Jacqueline Pfeifer (Lölling)	14
2	(Russia) Elena Nikitina	14
5	(Germany) Anja Selbach	12
6	(United States) Katie Uhlaender	11
6	(United Kingdom) Elizabeth Yarnold	11
6	(Germany) Steffi Hanzlik	11
9	(United States) Noelle Pikus-Pace	9
10	(United Kingdom) Shelley Rudman	8
10	(Switzerland) Maya Pedersen-Bieri	8

Podiums
Rank	Name	1st	2nd	3rd	Total
1	(Austria) Janine Flock	14	11	18	43
2	(Germany) Tina Hermann	19	13	7	39
3	(Canada) Mellisa Hollingsworth	7	13	15	35
4	(Germany) Jacqueline Pfeifer (Lölling)	14	10	8	32
5	(Germany) Anja Selbach	12	19	10	31
6	(Canada) Michelle Kelly	6	13	9	28
7	(Switzerland) Maya Pedersen-Bieri	8			26
8	(Russia) Elena Nikitina	14	5	4	23
8	(United States) Noelle Pikus-Pace	9	5	9	23
10	(United States) Katie Uhlaender	11	6	5	22
