= Jimmy Shea =

American skeleton racer (born 1968)

Jimmy Shea Jr.
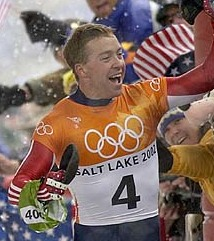
- Shea in 2002

Personal information
- Full name: James Edmound Shea Jr.
- Born: June 10, 1968 (age 58) West Hartford, Connecticut, U.S.
- Height: 5 ft 10 1/2 in (179 cm)
- Weight: 181 lb (82 kg)
Medal record
Men's skeleton
Representing the United States
Olympic Games
Gold medal – first place	2002 Salt Lake City	Men
World Championships
Gold medal – first place	1999 Altenberg	Men
Silver medal – second place	1997 Lake Placid	Men
Bronze medal – third place	2000 Igls	Men
World Cup Championships
Bronze medal – third place	1998–99	Men
Bronze medal – third place	2000–01	Men

James Edmound Shea Jr. (born June 10, 1968) is an American skeleton racer who won the gold medal at the 2002 Winter Olympics in Salt Lake City.

== Biography ==
Shea was the third generation of his family to take part in Winter Games. His father competed in Nordic combined and cross-country skiing events in the 1964 Winter Olympics, and his grandfather, Jack Shea, won two gold medals in the 1932 Winter Olympics at Lake Placid in speed skating. His grandfather also recited the athlete's oath at the 1932 opening ceremony. He was born and raised in West Hartford, Connecticut, and moved to Lake Placid, New York, in his late teens. He became the first American to win a World Cup race and a World Championship in the sport, and has won more World Cup victories than any other American. He retired in October 2005.

At the FIBT World Championships, Shea earned a complete set of medals in the men's skeleton event with a gold in 1999, a silver in 1997, and a bronze in 2000 (tied for bronze with Austria's Alexander Müller). His best overall seasonal finish in the men's Skeleton World Cup was third twice (1998–99, 2000–01).

Shea founded The Shea Family Foundation which raises money to help kids in sports. He formerly served on the Utah Board of Economic Development.

Shea has two daughters and a son and lived in Park City, Utah. In 2021, he was sentenced to two years of court-supervised probation after pleading guilty to two misdemeanors for sexual misconduct.

== 2002 Olympics ==
Along with his father, Jim Shea Sr., he passed the Olympic Torch to Cammi Granato and Picabo Street who then passed it to the 1980 U.S. Men's Hockey Team, who then ignited the Olympic Cauldron.

== See also ==
- List of Olympic medalist families
