= Tristan Gale =

American skeleton racer (born 1980)

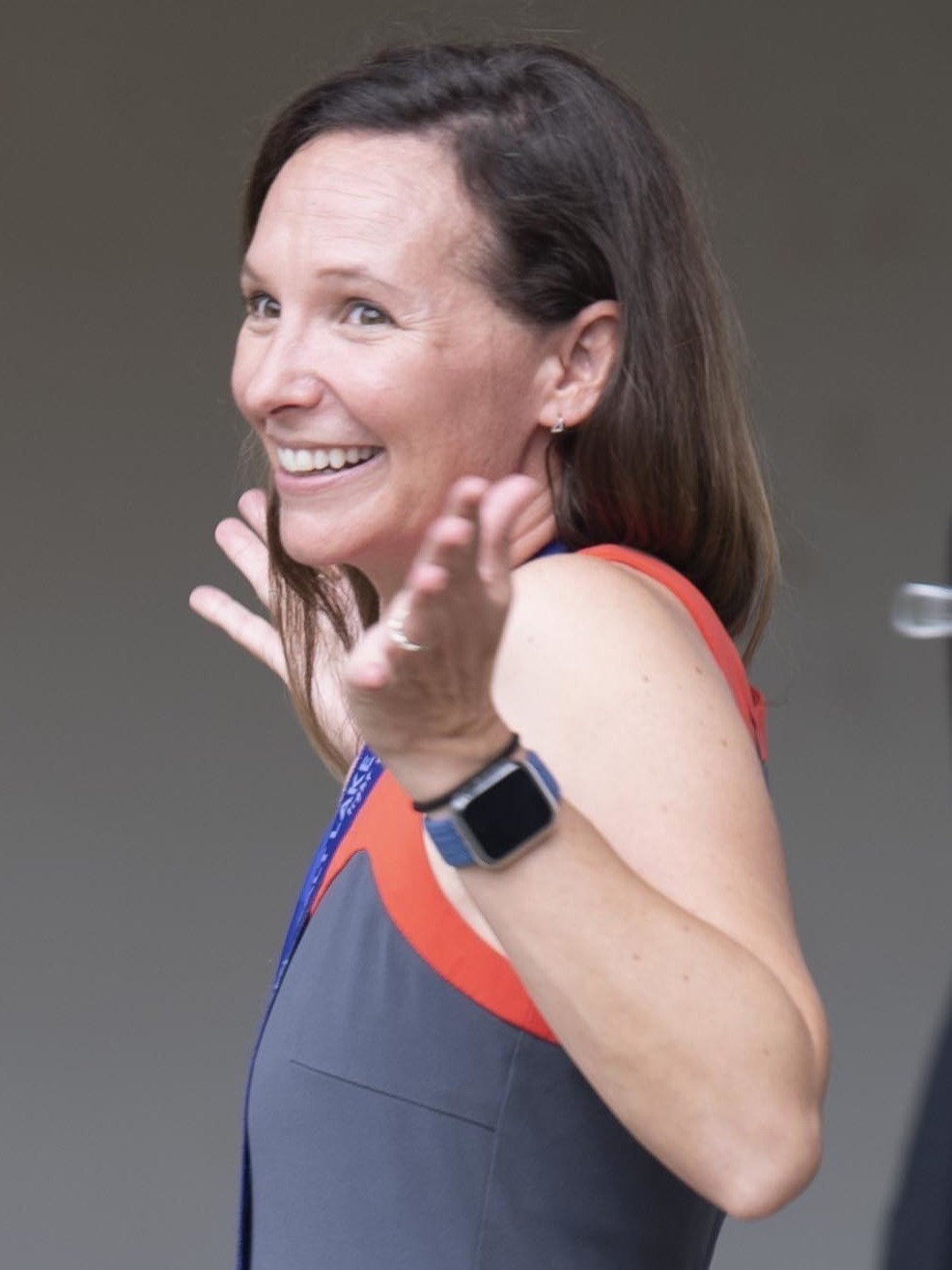
- Gale in 2021

Personal information
- Born: August 10, 1980 (age 45) Ruidoso, New Mexico
- Height: 5 ft 1 1/2 in (156 cm)
- Weight: 115 lb (52 kg)
Medal record
Women's skeleton
Representing the United States
Olympic Games
Gold medal – first place	2002 Salt Lake City	Women
World Championships
Bronze medal – third place	2003 Nagano	Women

Tristan Gale (born August 10, 1980) is an American skeleton racer who competed from 2001 to 2006. At the 2002 Winter Olympics, she became the inaugural women's skeleton champion. Gale dyed her hair with streaks of red, white and blue for the 2002 Olympics. During the 2002–2003 season, Tristan won a second gold medal on her home track in Salt Lake during a World Cup stop. She remains undefeated at the track in Utah since the Olympics.

Gale also won a bronze medal in the women's skeleton event at the 2003 FIBT World Championships in Nagano. She retired before the 2006 Winter Olympics in Turin. Gale's best overall seasonal finish in the Skeleton World Cup was third in 2002–3.

A native of Ruidoso, New Mexico, Gale lives in Salt Lake City.
