= Gregor Stähli =

Swiss skeleton racer (born 1968)

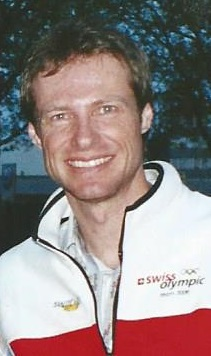

Personal information
- Born: 28 February 1968 (age 58) Zürich, Switzerland
Medal record
Men's skeleton
Representing Switzerland
Olympic Games
Bronze medal – third place	2002 Salt Lake City	Men
Bronze medal – third place	2006 Turin	Men
World Championships
Gold medal – first place	1994 Altenberg	Men
Gold medal – first place	2007 St. Moritz	Men
Gold medal – first place	2009 Lake Placid	Men
Silver medal – second place	1992 Calgary	Men
Silver medal – second place	2000 Igls	Men
Silver medal – second place	2005 Calgary	Men
Silver medal – second place	2009 Lake Placid	Mixed team
Bronze medal – third place	1990 Königssee	Men
Bronze medal – third place	1993 La Plagne	Men
Bronze medal – third place	2007 St. Moritz	Mixed team
World Cup Championships
Gold medal – first place	2001-02	Men
Silver medal – second place	1991-92	Men
Silver medal – second place	2005-06	Men
Bronze medal – third place	1992-93	Men

Gregor Stähli (born 28 February 1968 in Zürich) is a Swiss skeleton racer who has competed since 1989. He won two bronze Winter Olympic medals in the men's skeleton, earning them in 2002 and 2006.

Stähli also won ten medals at the FIBT World Championships, with three golds (men's skeleton: 1994, 2007, 2009), four silvers (men's skeleton: 1992, 2000, 2005, Mixed team: 2009), and three bronzes (men's skeleton: 1990, 1993; mixed team: 2007). He was overall men's Skeleton World Cup champion in 2001–02.

On 20 November 2009, Stähli suffered a thigh injury during the World Cup competition in Lake Placid, New York, which eventually forced his withdrawal from the 2010 Winter Olympics in Vancouver eight weeks later.
