= 2007–08 Skeleton World Cup =

The 2007–08 Skeleton World Cup is a multi race tournament over a season for skeleton. The season started on 26 November 2007 and ended on 24 February 2008. The World Cup is organised by the FIBT who also run world cups and championships in bobsleigh.

== Calendar ==
Date	Place	Disc.	Winner	Second	Third
November 29, 2007	(Canada) Calgary	Women's	(Canada) Michelle Kelly	(Canada) Mellisa Hollingsworth-Richards	(United Kingdom) Amy Williams
November 29, 2007	(Canada) Calgary	Men's	(Canada) Paul Boehm	(United Kingdom) Kristan Bromley	(Canada) Jon Montgomery
December 6, 2007	(United States) Park City	Women's	(Canada) Michelle Kelly	(United States) Katie Uhlaender	(United Kingdom) Amy Williams
December 6, 2007	(United States) Park City	Men's	(United States) Zach Lund	(United States) Eric Bernotas	(United Kingdom) Anthony Sawyer
December 14, 2007	(United States) Lake Placid	Women's	(United States) Katie Uhlaender	(Canada) Michelle Kelly	(Canada) Carla Pavan
December 14, 2007	(United States) Lake Placid	Men's	(United States) Eric Bernotas	(Canada) Jon Montgomery	(United States) Zach Lund
January 17, 2008	(Italy) Cesana	Women's	(Germany) Kerstin Jürgens	(Canada) Michelle Kelly	(Germany) Anja Huber
January 17, 2008	(Italy) Cesana	Men's	(Canada) Jon Montgomery	(United Kingdom) Anthony Sawyer	(United Kingdom) Adam Pengilly
January 18, 2008	(Italy) Cesana European Championships 2008	Women's	(United States) Katie Uhlaender	(Germany) Anja Huber	(Russia) Svetlana Trunova
January 18, 2008	(Italy) Cesana European Championships 2008	Men's	(United States) Zach Lund	(United Kingdom) Kristan Bromley	(United States) Eric Bernotas
January 25, 2008	(Switzerland) St. Moritz	Women's	(United States) Katie Uhlaender	(Canada) Carla Pavan	(Canada) Mellisa Hollingsworth-Richards
January 25, 2008	(Switzerland) St. Moritz	Men's	(United Kingdom) Kristan Bromley	(United States) Zach Lund	(United States) Eric Bernotas
February 1–2, 2008	(Germany) Königssee	Women's	(United States) Katie Uhlaender	(Germany) Kerstin Jürgens	(Germany) Marion Trott
February 1–2, 2008	(Germany) Königssee	Men's	(Germany) Florian Grassl	(United Kingdom) Kristan Bromley	(Latvia) Tomass Dukurs
February 8, 2008	(Germany) Winterberg	Women's	(Canada) Michelle Kelly	(Germany) Anja Huber	(United States) Katie Uhlaender
February 8, 2008	(Germany) Winterberg	Men's	(Latvia) Martins Dukurs	(Canada) Jon Montgomery	(Germany) Florian Grassl
February 11–24, 2008	(Germany) Altenberg	FIBT World Championships 2008			

== Standings ==
=== Men's ===
Pos.	Skeletoner	CAL	PAC	LPL	CES	CES	SMO	KÖN	WIN	Points
1.	(United Kingdom) Kristan Bromley	2	4	5	6	2	1	2	6	1583
2.	(Canada) Jon Montgomery	3	5	2	1	9	4	10	2	1517
3.	(United States) Zach Lund	11	1	3	5	1	2	5	9	1516
4.	(United States) Eric Bernotas	5	2	1	8	3	3	18	5	1443
5.	(Latvia) Martins Dukurs	7	11	4	7	7	6	11	1	1369
6.	(United Kingdom) Anthony Sawyer	12	3	8	2	6	9	9	10	1322
7.	(Austria) Markus Penz	6	6	16	17	18	7	4	7	1144
8.	(Germany) Florian Grassl	19	23	15	10	8	5	1	3	1141
9.	(United Kingdom) Adam Pengilly	4	11	10	3	5	17	6		1120
10.	(New Zealand) Ben Sandford	8	10	7	16	9	27	17	4	1032
11.	(Latvia) Tomass Dukurs	18	15	20	12	17	12	3	13	916
12.	(Switzerland) Daniel Mächler	15	8	6	24	22	14	14	12	893
13.	(Germany) Frank Rommel	9	25	13	11	14	21	8	18	862
14.	(Germany) Sebastian Haupt				4	4	11	7	8	848
15.	(Canada) Michael Douglas	13	19	12	13	16	16	16	15	834
16.	(Russia) Aleksandr Tretyakov	10	7	19	15	12	22	13		794
17.	(Japan) Kazuhiro Koshi	23	24	22	9	13	10	15	17	759
18.	(United States) Caleb Smith	16	16	9	19	21	8	21	22	758
19.	(Japan) Masaru Inada	20	13	17	18	15	20	19	16	698
20.	(Austria) Matthias Guggenberger	14	18	21	20	23	19	12	21	636
21.	(Netherlands) Peter van Wees	22	22	14	22	24	15	23	24	524
22.	(Canada) Paul Boehm	1	9	11						513

=== Women's ===
Pos.	Skeletoner	CAL	PAC	LPL	CES	CES	SMO	KÖN	WIN	Points
1.	(United States) Katie Uhlaender	7	2	1	4	1	1	1	3	1670
2.	(Canada) Michelle Kelly	1	1	2	2	6	9	6	1	1599
3.	(Canada) Mellisa Hollingsworth-Richards	2	5	4	8	7	3	9	4	1458
4.	(Germany) Kerstin Jürgens	4	9	10	1	4	10	2	5	1443
5.	(Germany) Anja Huber	6	6	19	3	2	11	4	2	1374
6.	(Canada) Carla Pavan	8	4	3	15	10	2	8	9	1322
7.	(United Kingdom) Amy Williams	3	3	6	5	8	22	5	8	1320
8.	(Australia) Emma Lincoln-Smith	9	14	7	7	9	8	14	13	1144
9.	(Germany) Marion Trott	11	15	9	14	16	5	3	10	1128
10.	(Australia) Michelle Steele	5	8	16	11	14	6	10	14	1120
11.	(Russia) Svetlana Trunova	13	21	8	12	3	19	7	6	1088
12.	(Switzerland) Jessica Kilian		11	17	6	5	4	16	15	976
13.	(United States) Courtney Yamada	12	7	12	16	17	13	12	16	952
14.	(Australia) Melissa Hoar	17	12	13	13	13	12	15	12	936
15.	(United Kingdom) Maggie Davies	15	16	14	19	20	16	17	7	806
16.	(Russia) Olga Korobkina	16	12	15	9	12	23	11		794
17.	(United States) Anne O'Shea	10	10	11	17	19	14	DNF		698
18.	(New Zealand) Tionette Stoddard	21	23	18	20	15	7	18	18	692
19.	(Japan) Eiko Nakayama	18	17	21	18	18	17	13	19	672
20.	(Norway) Desiree Bjerke	14	18	5	10	11				656
