= 2006–07 Skeleton World Cup =

The 2006–07 Skeleton World Cup is a multi race tournament over a season for skeleton. The season started on 27 November 2006 and ended on 25 February 2007. The World Cup is organised by the FIBT who also run world cups and championships in bobsleigh.

== Calendar ==
=== Men ===
Date	Location	Winner	Second	Third
November 27, 2006	Calgary, Canada	(Canada) Jeff Pain	(Russia) Aleksandr Tretyakov	(Canada) Jon Montgomery
December 7, 2006	Park City, Utah, United States	(United States) Zach Lund	(Canada) Jeff Pain	(Russia) Aleksandr Tretyakov
December 15, 2006	Lake Placid, United States	(United States) Zach Lund	(United States) Caleb Smith	(United States) Eric Bernotas
January 13, 2007	Nagano, Japan	(United States) Eric Bernotas	(United States) Zach Lund	(Japan) Masaru Inada
January 19, 2007	Igls, Austria	(Russia) Aleksandr Tretyakov	(Switzerland) Daniel Maechler	(Switzerland) Gregor Staehli
February 9, 2007	Cesana Pariol, Italy	(United States) Zach Lund	(United States) Eric Bernotas	(Germany) Michi Halilovic
February 16, 2007	Winterberg, Germany	(Russia) Aleksandr Tretyakov	(Germany) Michi Halilovic	(Latvia) Martins Dukurs
February 24, 2007	Königssee, Germany	(United States) Zach Lund	(Russia) Aleksandr Tretyakov	(Austria) Markus Penz

=== Women ===
Date	Location	Winner	Second	Third
November 30, 2006	Calgary, Canada	(United States) Katie Uhlaender	(Switzerland) Maya Pedersen	(United States) Noelle Pikus-Pace
December 7, 2006	Park City, Utah, United States	(United States) Katie Uhlaender	(Switzerland) Maya Pedersen	(Canada) Michelle Kelly
December 15, 2006	Lake Placid, United States	(United States) Katie Uhlaender	(United States) Noelle Pikus-Pace	(Switzerland) Maya Pedersen
January 13, 2007	Nagano, Japan	(United States) Katie Uhlaender	(Australia) Michelle Steele	(United States) Courtney Yamada
January 19, 2007	Igls, Austria	(Germany) Anja Huber	(United States) Katie Uhlaender	(Canada) Michelle Kelly
February 9, 2007	Cesana Pariol, Italy	(Germany) Kerstin Juergens	(Germany) Monique Riekewald	(United States) Noelle Pikus-Pace
February 16, 2007	Winterberg, Germany	(United States) Katie Uhlaender	(Germany) Anja Huber	(United States) Noelle Pikus-Pace
February 23, 2007	Königssee, Germany	(Germany) Anja Huber	(Canada) Michelle Kelly	(United States) Noelle Pikus-Pace

== Men's overall results ==
=== Individual ===
Pos.	Skeletoner	CAL	PAC	LPL	NAG	IGL	TUR	WIN	KÖN	Points
1.	(United States) Zach Lund	65	100	100	90	65	100	33	100	653
2.	(United States) Eric Bernotas	39	60	80	100	55	90	60	60	544
3.	(Russia) Aleksandr Tretyakov	90	80	27		100		100	90	487
4.	(Austria) Markus Penz	36	55	55	42	70	36	50	80	424
5.	(United Kingdom) Adam Pengilly	60	65	45	65	27	65	36	45	408
6.	(Canada) Jon Montgomery	80	39	33		50	42	70	24	338
7.	(United States) Christopher Hedquist	55	42	65	45	33	4	12	36	292
8.	(Canada) Jeff Pain	100	90	70		24				284
9.	(Latvia) Tomass Dukurs	22	6	36	55	22	22	45	70	278
10.	(United Kingdom) Anthony Sawyer	6	22	24	70	36	55	42	16	271
11.	(Switzerland) Daniel Mächler	50	33	50		90	8	8	20	259
12.	(Latvia) Martins Dukurs	20	10	8	27	45		80	65	255
13.	(Japan) Masaru Inada	14	16	14	80	16	50	16	42	248
14.	(Japan) Kazuhiro Koshi	8	27	22	60	18	60	20	14	229
15.	(Germany) Michi Halilovic						80	90	42	212

=== Nations ===
Pos.	Team	CAL	PAC	LPL	NAG	IGL	TUR	WIN	KÖN	Points
1.	United States	70	75	79	79	70	79	63	75	590
2.	Canada	78	69	68	53	69	63	53	40	493
3.	United Kingdom	56	60	57	73	60	70	60	53	489
4.	Russia	67	67	44	56	59	49	58	65	465
5.	Austria	44	47	48	51	67	52	67	71	447
6.	Latvia	47	34	46	60	56	39	70	73	425
7.	Germany	49	65	45		50	64	75	65	413
8.	Japan	37	47	44	73	43	68	44	51	407
9.	Netherlands	30	43	57						130
10.	Switzerland	59	65	44						168
11.	Italy	21	27	27						75
12.	New Zealand	39	39	47						125
13.	Bermuda	10	9	7						26
14.	Ireland	7	10	9						26
15.	France									
16.	Croatia									

== Women's overall results ==
=== Individual ===
Pos.	Skeletoner	CAL	PAC	LPL	NAG	IGL	TUR	WIN	KÖN	Points
1.	(United States) Katie Uhlaender	100	100	100	100	90	65	100	60	715
2.	(United States) Noelle Pikus-Pace	80	60	90	60	70	80	80	80	600
3.	(Canada) Michelle Kelly	dsq	80	70		80	42	27	90	389
4.	(United States) Courtney Yamada	39	27	60	80	45	22	65	50	388
5.	(Switzerland) Maya Pedersen	90	90	80		50			70	380
6.	(Germany) Kerstin Jürgens	50	45	36		60	100	55	30	376
7.	(Canada) Amy Gough	16	42	45	65	65	50	70	8	361
8.	(Germany) Anja Huber					100	70	90	100	360
9.	(Canada) Carla Pavan	65	55	70		55	60	16	33	354
10.	(Australia) Michelle Steele	45	50	30	90	33	33	30	39	350
11.	(Germany) Monique Riekewald	33	65	33		39	90	45	16	321
12.	(United States) Bree Schaaf Boyer	60	20	50	36	30	39	24	4	263
13.	(United Kingdom) Amy Williams	42	24	39		18	18	60	42	243
14.	(Germany) Julia Eichhorn	36	16			20	55	42	65	234
15.	(Canada) Lindsay Alcock	70	70	27		16	45			228

=== Nations ===
Pos.	Team	CAL	PAC	LPL	NAG	IGL	TUR	WIN	KÖN	Points
1.	United States	58	55	59	58	56	54	58	53	451
2.	Canada	53	55	54	53	54	48	45	51	413
3.	Germany	42	48	37		55	59	53	56	350
4.	Australia	38	42	31	53	32	36	40	39	311
5.	Switzerland	53	49	43		33	8		51	237
6.	United Kingdom	36	34	41		33	12	39	35	230
7.	Russia	29	18	23	38	23	26	35	26	218
8.	Japan	16	17	21	43	13	19	16	18	163
9.	Norway	10	14	24	23	16	19	9	9	124
10.	Italy	13	17	10		19	23	17	7	106
11.	United States Virgin Islands	5	4	7		4		5	13	38
12.	New Zealand	8	7	9		5		7		36
