= Skeleton at the 2010 Winter Olympics – Men's =

Men's Skeleton at the XXI Olympic Winter Games
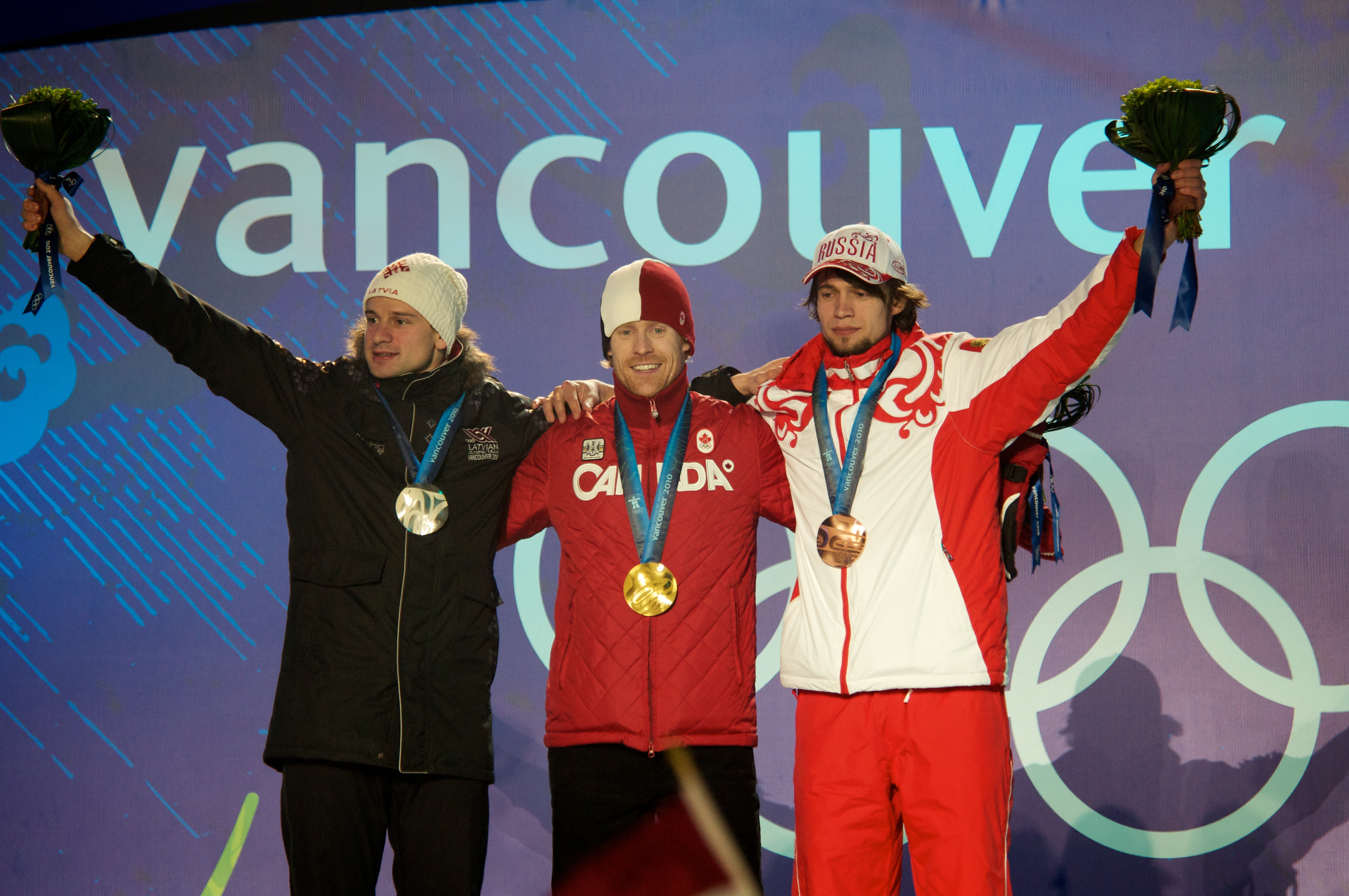
- Venue: Whistler Sliding Centre
- Dates: 18–19 February 2010
- Competitors: 28 from 17 nations
- Winning time: 3:29.73

Medalists
1st place, gold medalist(s)		Jon Montgomery	Canada
2nd place, silver medalist(s)		Martins Dukurs	Latvia
3rd place, bronze medalist(s)		Aleksandr Tretyakov	Russia

The men's skeleton event at the 2010 Winter Olympics in Vancouver, Canada, took place at the Whistler Sliding Centre on 18–19 February. Canada's Duff Gibson was the defending Olympic champion. Gibson retired after the 2006 Olympics. Switzerland's Gregor Stähli, the defending Olympic bronze medalist was the defending world champion, but did not compete due to a thigh injury sustained during the World Cup event in Lake Placid, New York, on 20 November 2009. The test event held at the venue was won by Jon Montgomery of Canada. The last World Cup event prior to the 2010 Games took place in Igls, Austria (southeast of Innsbruck), on 23 January 2010 and was won by Latvia's Martins Dukurs who also won the overall World Cup title.

Canada's Jon Montgomery took the gold medal, 0.07 seconds ahead of Latvia's Martins Dukurs who had been leading heading into the final run. Bronze was won by Aleksandr Tretyakov of Russia.

== Records ==
While the IOC does not consider skeleton times eligible for Olympic records, the FIBT does maintain records for both the start and a complete run at each track it competes.

These records were set during the test event for the 2010 Games on 5 February 2009.

Type	Date	Athlete	Time
Start	5 February 2009	Aleksandr Tretyakov (RUS)	4.52
Track	5 February 2009	Jeff Pain (CAN)	53.67

== Qualifying athletes ==
On 20 January 2010, the FIBT announced that the following teams had qualified for the 2010 Games: These quotas were updated on 26 January 2010.

These are the athletes who qualified for the men's event as of 1 February 2010.

- Eric Bernotas (USA)
- Kristan Bromley (GBR)
- Cho In Ho (KOR)
- Sergey Chudinov (RUS)
- John Daly (USA)
- Anthony Deane (AUS)
- Michael Douglas (CAN)
- Nicola Drocco (ITA)
- Martins Dukurs (LAT)
- Tomass Dukurs (LAT)
- John Farrow (AUS) - withdrawn prior to event.
- Matthias Guggenberger (AUT)
- Michi Halilovic (GER)
- Kazuhiro Koshi (JPN)
- Zach Lund (USA)
- Ander Mirambell (ESP)
- Jon Montgomery (CAN)
- Pascal Oswald (SUI)
- Jeff Pain (CAN)
- Adam Pengilly (GBR)
- Iain Roberts (NZL)
- Frank Rommel (GER)
- Gregory Saint-Genies (FRA)
- Ben Sandford (NZL)
- Anže Šetina (SLO)
- Patrick Shannon (IRL)
- Patrick Singleton (BER) - withdrawn prior to event.
- Sandro Stielicke (GER)
- Shinsuke Tayama (JPN)
- Aleksandr Tretyakov (RUS)

== Results ==
The first two runs took place on 18 February at 18:30 PST and 19:45 PST. On 19 February, the final two runs took place at 18:20 PST and 19:30 PST.

First run start order was released on the afternoon of 17 February 2010.

TR - Track Record. Top finish in each run is in boldface.

Douglas, who was in seventh place after the second run, was disqualified for not getting his sled into parque fermé, the area where the skeleton sleds are inspected before they go down the Sliding Centre, in a timely manner. Roberts withdrew prior to the start of the third run. Only the top 20 skeleton racers competed in the fourth and final run. Montgomery came from behind to edge Dukurs in the fourth run.

Rank	Bib	Athlete	Country	Run 1	Run 2	Run 3	Run 4	Total	Behind
1st place, gold medalist(s)	5	Jon Montgomery	Canada	52.60	**52.57**	**52.20** **TR**	**52.36**	3:29.73	+0.00
2nd place, silver medalist(s)	1	Martins Dukurs	Latvia	**52.32** **TR**	52.59	52.28	52.61	3:29.80	+0.07
3rd place, bronze medalist(s)	8	Aleksandr Tretyakov	Russia	52.70	53.05	52.30	52.70	3:30.75	+1.02
4	4	Tomass Dukurs	Latvia	52.94	52.88	52.62	52.69	3:31.13	+1.40
5	12	Zach Lund	United States	53.04	52.85	52.57	52.81	3:31.27	+1.54
6	6	Kristan Bromley	Great Britain	52.91	52.89	52.70	52.80	3:31.30	+1.57
7	2	Frank Rommel	Germany	52.90	53.25	52.55	52.70	3:31.40	+1.67
8	15	Matthias Guggenberger	Austria	52.75	53.02	53.03	53.01	3:31.81	+2.08
9	10	Jeff Pain	Canada	53.03	53.18	53.00	52.65	3:31.86	+2.13
10	3	Sandro Stielicke	Germany	53.18	53.24	52.64	53.02	3:32.08	+2.35
11	14	Ben Sandford	New Zealand	53.11	53.32	52.90	53.26	3:32.59	+2.86
12	17	Sergey Chudinov	Russia	53.64	53.26	53.13	52.92	3:32.95	+3.22
13	7	Mirsad Halilović	Germany	53.09	53.87	52.92	53.24	3:33.12	+3.39
14	9	Eric Bernotas	United States	53.23	53.55	53.33	53.16	3:33.27	+3.54
15	21	Gregory Saint-Genies	France	53.40	53.16	53.32	53.43	3:33.31	+3.58
16	18	Pascal Oswald	Switzerland	53.77	53.68	53.00	53.30	3:33.75	+4.02
17	13	John Daly	United States	54.08	53.65	53.23	53.05	3:34.01	+4.28
18	16	Adam Pengilly	Great Britain	53.75	54.17	53.36	53.23	3:34.51	+4.78
19	23	Shinsuke Tayama	Japan	53.94	53.84	54.03	53.36	3:35.17	+5.44
20	20	Kazuhiro Koshi	Japan	54.02	54.10	53.74	53.42	3:35.28	+5.55
21	19	Anže Šetina	Slovenia	54.50	54.35	53.75		2:42.60	
22	27	Cho In Ho	South Korea	54.46	54.42	54.28		2:43.16	
23	22	Anthony Deane	Australia	54.55	54.12	54.68		2:43.35	
24	25	Ander Mirambell	Spain	54.77	54.59	54.26		2:43.62	
25	26	Patrick Shannon	Ireland	55.18	55.20	54.60		2:44.98	
26	28	Nicola Drocco	Italy	55.77	54.60	54.97		2:45.34	
	24	Iain Roberts	New Zealand	55.21	57.58			DNS	
	11	Michael Douglas	Canada	52.83	53.04			DSQ	
