= Skeleton at the 2010 Winter Olympics – Women's =

Women's Skeleton at the XXI Olympic Winter Games
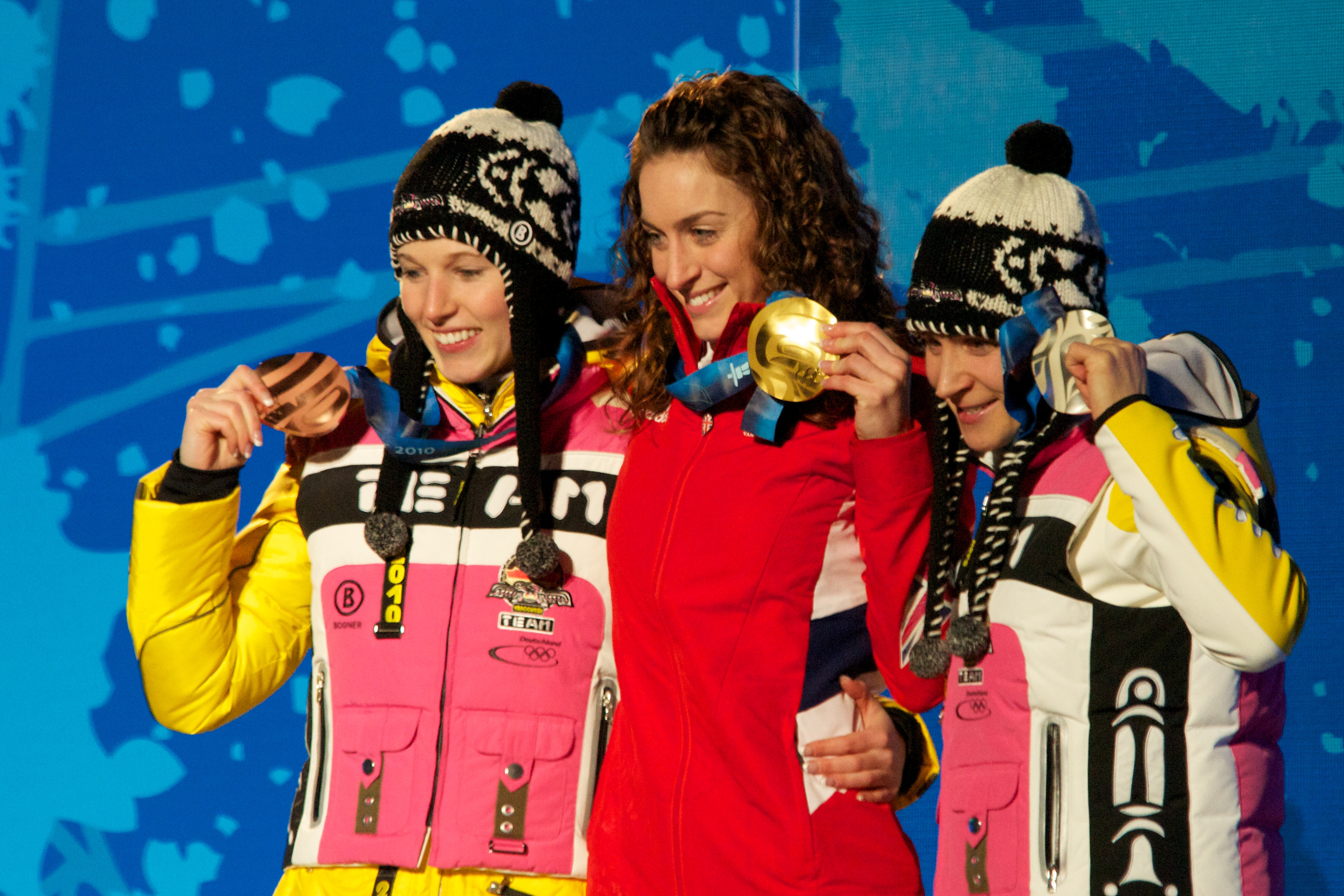
- (left to right) Anja Huber, Amy Williams, and Kerstin Szymkowiak
- Venue: Whistler Sliding Centre
- Dates: 18–19 February 2010
- Competitors: 20 from 12 nations
- Winning time: 3:35.64

Medalists
1st place, gold medalist(s)		Amy Williams	Great Britain
2nd place, silver medalist(s)		Kerstin Szymkowiak	Germany
3rd place, bronze medalist(s)		Anja Huber	Germany

The women's skeleton event at the 2010 Winter Olympics took place at the Whistler Sliding Centre on 18–19 February. The competition was won by British athlete Amy Williams, who set new course records for the track on her first and third runs. Williams, who had never before won a World Cup or World Championship event, became the first British athlete to win a solo Winter Olympic gold medal in 30 years. German sliders Kerstin Szymkowiak and Anja Huber won the silver and bronze medals respectively. Williams' teammate Shelley Rudman, who had won the silver medal at the 2006 Winter Olympics, and Canadian Mellisa Hollingsworth, both of whom had been expected to be in medal contention, were disappointed.

Williams' victory was not without controversy, as the United States and Canada filed complaints with the judges related to Williams' helmet. However, judges ruled that ridges in her helmet did not violate International Bobsleigh and Tobogganing Federation (FIBT) rules, and rejected the complaints.

== Logistics ==
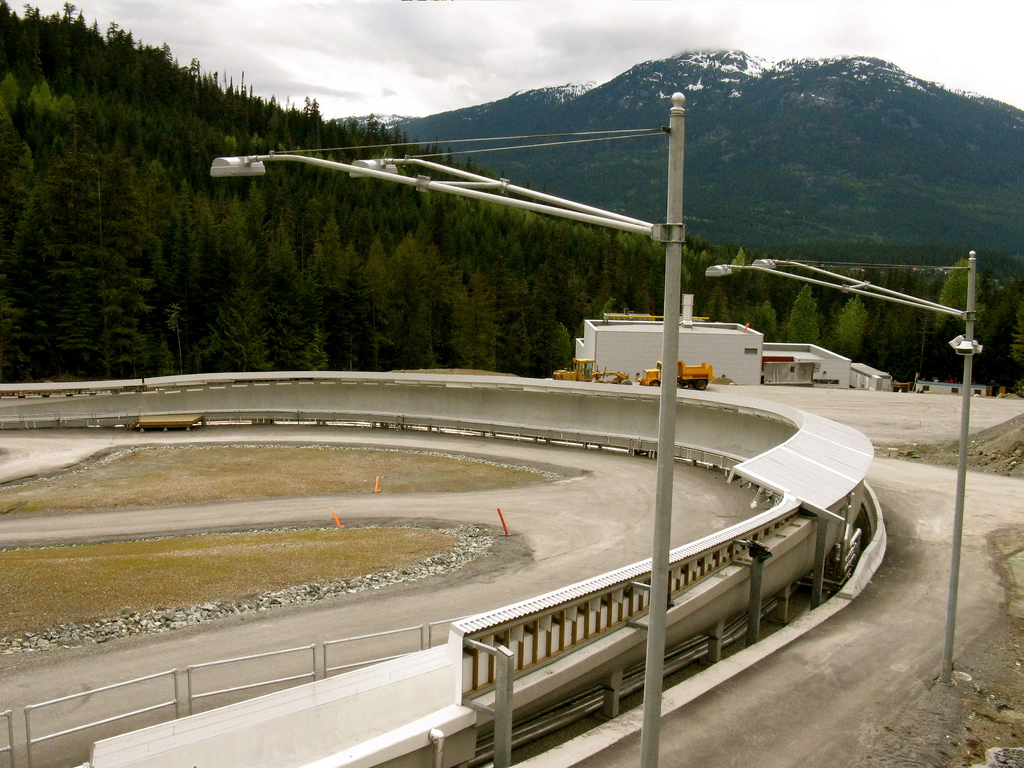
The Whistler Sliding Centre in June, 2008

=== Track ===
The Whistler Sliding Centre in Whistler, British Columbia was the site of women's skeleton at the 2010 Olympic Games in Vancouver, Canada. The track was constructed between 2005 and 2008, and became only the 15th competition-level track in the world. It was certified for competition in sliding sports by the International Luge Federation (FIL) and the International Bobsleigh and Tobogganing Federation (FIBT) in March, 2008 in a process called homologation where hundreds of athletes ran the track. This was the first time many competitors at the 2010 Games were able to try the track and begin to develop strategies for it. Canadian athletes hoped that having it open two years before the Games, and having that amount of time to train on it, would give them an advantage in the Games. The Whistler Sliding Centre quickly gained a reputation as one of the fastest tracks in the world.

=== Rules and description of competition ===
Rules for the Olympic skeleton competitions were set by the FIBT and the International Olympic Committee (IOC). They entrusted four to seven officials with making decisions regarding competition rules: one or two technical delegates, a jury president, two jury members, and two optional jury assistants. These decisions were implemented and enforced by a race director, to whom the overall responsibility for running the competition was given. Under the rules, competitors were guaranteed a minimum of six official training runs in the days prior to the competition. The competition itself consisted of four heats, with the starting order of athletes determined by their FIBT rankings prior to the start of the Games. Athletes began their runs on their sleds at a starting block, ran briefly while holding their sleds, and then laid on their stomachs on the sleds through the remainder of the course. Athletes were ranked by the speed of their times between their start and when they crossed the finish line at the bottom of the track.

== Preview ==
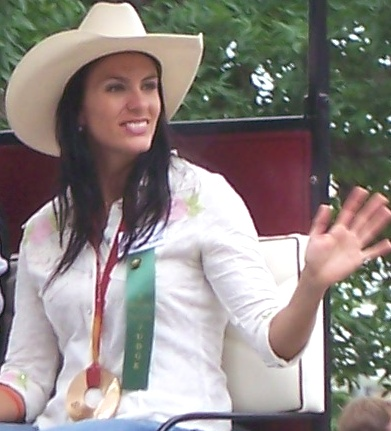
Canadian slider Mellisa Hollingsworth was among those expected to be in medal contention, but fell from second to fifth places in her final run.

Much of the speculation about potential medal winners before the Games focused on athletes from Great Britain, the United States, and Canada. Athletes from German-speaking countries had traditionally been dominant in the sliding sports, luge and bobsleigh, but following the re-introduction of skeleton, they had not been as strongly competitive in the new sport. Mellisa Hollingsworth of Canada, the defending Olympic bronze medalist, won the 2009–10 Skeleton World Cup, and was considered a strong contender if not the favorite to win. British athlete Shelley Rudman won the only British medal at the 2006 Winter Olympics with her silver in skeleton, and her bronze medal at the European Championships just prior to the Games kept her name in media previews of the Olympic event. Her countrywoman Amy Williams, however, finished outside of the medal places in both the World Cup, in which she placed fifth, and the European Championships, in which she placed sixth. American Noelle Pikus-Pace had not been able to compete in the 2006 Games after a runaway bobsleigh had broken her leg.

A number of other athletes had the potential to win medals by virtue of previous strong finishes in international competition. Switzerland's Maya Pedersen-Bieri was the defending Olympic champion. The defending world champion was Germany's Marion Trott, who also won the test event held at the venue. The last 2009–10 Skeleton World Cup prior to the 2010 Games took place in Igls, Austria (southeast of Innsbruck) on 22 January 2010 and was won by Germany's Anja Huber.

== Standing records ==
While the IOC does not consider skeleton times eligible for Olympic records, the FIBT does maintain records for both the start and a complete run at each track it competes. These records were set during the test event for the 2010 Games on 5 February 2009.

Type	Date	Athlete	Time
Start	5 February 2009	Anja Huber (GER)	4.97
Track	5 February 2009	Mellisa Hollingsworth (CAN)	54.81

== Qualifying athletes ==
On 20 January 2010, the FIBT announced the teams which had qualified for the 2010 Games, the quotas being subsequently updated on 26 January 2010. The athletes who qualified for the women's event were:

- Desiree Bjerke (NOR) (27, IBSF World Ranking as 17 February 2010)
- Amy Gough (CAN) (9)
- Melissa Hoar (AUS) (11)
- Mellisa Hollingsworth (CAN) (1)
- Anja Huber (GER) (8)
- Michelle Kelly (CAN) (13)
- Nozomi Komuro (JPN) (24)
- Emma Lincoln-Smith (AUS) (14)
- Maria Marinela Mazilu (ROU) (42)
- Maya Pedersen (SUI) (10)
- Noelle Pikus-Pace (USA) (6)
- Shelley Rudman (GBR) (2)
- Tionette Stoddard (NZL) (19)
- Kerstin Szymkowiak (GER) (3)
- Marion Trott (GER) (4)
- Svetlana Trunova (RUS) (12)
- Katie Uhlaender (USA) (7)
- Amy Williams (GBR) (5)
- Elena Yudina (RUS) (20)
- Costanza Zanoletti (ITA) (37)

== Competition ==
The first run start order was released on the afternoon of 17 February 2010. The first two runs took place on 18 February at 16:00 PST (Pacific Standard Time) and 17:00 PST. On 19 February, the final two runs took take place at 15:45 PST and 16:45 PST. During the first run, Amy Williams broke the previous course record by nearly a full second, finishing first with a time of 53.83 seconds and reaching a top speed of 143.3 km/h (89.0 mph). She led the second run as well. German slider Kerstin Szymkowiak was in second place after two runs, nearly a third of a second behind Williams. Mellisa Hollingsworth, competing on home soil and called the favorite to win in a number of media accounts, was in third place, trailing Szymkowiak after two runs by 0.09 seconds. Shelley Rudman trailed by nearly a full second, surprising many observers who had expected her to be in medal contention. Japanese athlete Nozomi Komuro was disqualified after the first heat because her sled did not have the required FIBT control sticker.

The United States, Canada and Germany, together with two unnamed teams, lodged a protest with officials following Williams' successful first day of competition. The protest alleged that her helmet was illegal, as ridges in it might give her an unfair aerodynamic advantage. In accordance with competition rules, the jury of officials inspected the helmet, and rejected the protest. Their grounds for doing so were that the ridges in the helmet were not a separate piece affixed to the helmet, expressly banned by FIBT rules, but rather an integral part of the helmet, which made the helmet legal. A second protest, filed jointly by the US and Canada on the 19th, was also rejected.

The next day, in her third run, Williams again set a new course record, 53.68 seconds, and won the final run as well to secure the gold medal. Williams became the first British sportsperson to win an individual Winter Olympic gold medal in thirty years. Prior to this win, Williams had never won a World Cup or World Championship event. German athletes, Kerstin Szymkowiak and Anja Huber, won the silver and bronze medals, the first Olympic medals for Germany in the sport. Williams' teammate Shelley Rudman fought her way into the lead briefly after a fast final run, but was overtaken by a five other athletes and finished sixth. Canada's Hollingsworth dropped from third place after the first two runs to fifth after the final run. American Noelle Pikus-Pace, who was in sixth place after the third run, finished fourth in the overall standings.

== Results ==
TR - Track Record (in italics for previous marks). Top finish in each run is in boldface.

Rank	Bib	Athlete	Country	Run 1	Run 2	Run 3	Run 4	Total	Behind
1st place, gold medalist(s)	5	Amy Williams	Great Britain	**53.83** TR	54.13	**53.68** TR	54.00	3:35.64	+0.00
2nd place, silver medalist(s)	3	Kerstin Szymkowiak	Germany	54.15 TR	**54.11**	53.91	54.03	3:36.20	+0.56
3rd place, bronze medalist(s)	8	Anja Huber	Germany	54.17	54.21	54.10	53.88	3:36.36	+0.72
4	6	Noelle Pikus-Pace	United States	54.30	54.21	53.88	54.07	3:36.46	+0.82
5	1	Mellisa Hollingsworth	Canada	54.18 TR	54.17	53.81	54.44	3:36.60	+0.96
6	2	Shelley Rudman	Great Britain	54.66	54.26	53.95	**53.82**	3:36.69	+1.05
7	9	Amy Gough	Canada	54.14	54.78	53.92	54.17	3:37.01	+1.37
8	4	Marion Trott	Germany	54.53	54.53	53.88	54.17	3:37.11	+1.47
9	10	Maya Pedersen-Bieri	Switzerland	54.53	54.83	54.24	53.91	3:37.51	+1.87
10	14	Emma Lincoln-Smith	Australia	54.28	54.41	54.54	54.40	3:37.63	+1.99
11	7	Katie Uhlaender	United States	54.51	54.53	54.54	54.35	3:37.93	+2.29
12	11	Melissa Hoar	Australia	54.73	54.48	54.48	54.53	3:38.22	+2.58
13	13	Michelle Kelly	Canada	54.73	55.49	55.56	55.01	3:40.79	+5.15
14	15	Tionette Stoddard	New Zealand	55.85	55.93	55.02	54.89	3:41.69	+6.05
15	19	Costanza Zanoletti	Italy	55.48	55.63	55.38	55.31	3:41.80	+6.16
16	12	Svetlana Trunova	Russia	56.47	55.32	55.23	55.17	3:42.19	+6.55
17	18	Desiree Bjerke	Norway	56.48	55.28	55.34	55.26	3:42.36	+6.72
18	16	Elena Yudina	Russia	55.42	56.06	55.54	55.77	3:42.79	+7.15
19	20	Maria Marinela Mazilu	Romania	57.10	57.03	58.14	57.65	3:49.92	+14.28
	17	Nozomi Komuro	Japan					DSQ	
