= Skeleton at the 2006 Winter Olympics – Women's =

Women's Skeleton at the XX Olympic Winter Games
- Pictogram for skeleton
- Venue: Cesana Pariol
- Dates: 16 February 2006
- Competitors: 15 from 12 nations

Medalists
1st place, gold medalist(s)		Maya Pedersen	Switzerland
2nd place, silver medalist(s)		Shelley Rudman	Great Britain
3rd place, bronze medalist(s)		Mellisa Hollingsworth	Canada

The women's skeleton at the 2006 Winter Olympics took place on 16 February, at the Cesana Pariol.

== Results ==
Two-time world champion Maya Pedersen set the two fastest times to win the gold medal, Switzerland's first gold of the games. Shelley Rudman won silver, Great Britain's only medal of the games. Mellisa Hollingsworth-Richards took bronze for Canada, the first Olympic medal in skeleton won by a Canadian athlete.

Rudman's hometown of Pewsey, Wiltshire held a twelve-hour canoe marathon to raise money to help her go to Turin after she was disqualified from the 2005 world championships in Calgary for her sled being 200 grams (0.44 lb) overweight after she was denied funding by the British Bobsleigh and Skeleton Federation. Pederson trained for the event by watching a video of the course on a big screen in her living room while lying down on her sled on a table.

Rank	Name	Country	Run 1	Run 2	Total	Diff.
1	Maya Pedersen-Bieri	Switzerland	0:59.64	1:00.19	1:59.83	—
2	Shelley Rudman	Great Britain	1:00.57	1:00.49	2:01.06	+1.23
3	Mellisa Hollingsworth-Richards	Canada	1:00.39	1:01.02	2:01.41	+1.58
4	Diana Sartor	Germany	1:00.29	1:01.40	2:01.69	+1.86
5	Costanza Zanoletti	Italy	1:00.99	1:01.18	2:02.17	+2.34
6	Katie Uhlaender	United States	1:00.87	1:01.43	2:02.30	+2.47
7	Tanja Morel	Switzerland	1:00.85	1:01.65	2:02.50	+2.67
8	Anja Huber	Germany	1:01.12	1:01.44	2:02.56	+2.73
9	Desiree Bjerke	Norway	1:00.92	1:01.70	2:02.62	+2.79
10	Lindsay Alcock	Canada	1:01.26	1:01.59	2:02.85	+3.02
11	Svetlana Trunova	Russia	1:01.23	1:01.83	2:03.06	+3.23
12	Louise Corcoran	New Zealand	1:01.06	1:02.03	2:03.09	+3.26
13	Michelle Steele	Australia	1:01.26	1:02.21	2:03.47	+3.64
14	Eiko Nakayama	Japan	1:01.82	1:02.10	2:03.92	+4.09
15	Monika Wolowiec	Poland	1:02.31	1:02.99	2:05.30	+5.47
