= Athletics at the 2002 Commonwealth Games – Men's decathlon =

Men's decathlon at the Commonwealth Games

The men's decathlon event at the 2002 Commonwealth Games was held on 27–28 July.

== Medalists ==
Gold	Silver	Bronze
Claston Bernard; Jamaica	Matthew McEwen; Australia	Jamie Quarry; Scotland

== Results ==
=== 100 metres ===
Rank	Heat	Name	Nationality	Time	Points	Notes
1	2	Georgios Andreou	Cyprus	10.86	892	
2	2	Claston Bernard	Jamaica	10.92	878	
3	1	Dale Garland	Guernsey	11.01	858	
4	2	Matthew McEwen	Australia	11.12	834	
5	2	Jamie Quarry	Scotland	11.12	834	
6	2	Scott Ferrier	Australia	11.16	825	
7	1	Anthony Sawyer	England	11.17	823	
8	2	Barry Thomas	England	11.22	812	
9	1	Selwin Lieutier	Mauritius	11.23	810	
10	1	Joseph Rodan	Fiji	11.28	799	
11	1	Michael Nolan	Canada	11.35	784	
12	1	John Heanley	England	11.36	782	

=== Long jump ===
Rank	Athlete	Nationality	#1	#2	#3	Result	Points	Notes	Overall
1	Scott Ferrier	Australia	7.23	7.13	7.35	7.35	898		1723
2	Barry Thomas	England	7.05	7.17	7.10	7.17	854		1666
3	Jamie Quarry	Scotland	x	7.00	7.16	7.16	852		1686
4	Dale Garland	Guernsey	6.99	7.16	x	7.16	852		1710
5	Michael Nolan	Canada	x	7.10	6.96	7.10	838		1622
6	Matthew McEwen	Australia	6.73	7.07	x	7.07	830		1664
7	Claston Bernard	Jamaica	6.74	7.02	x	7.02	818		1696
8	Joseph Rodan	Fiji	x	6.92	4.94	6.92	795		1594
9	Anthony Sawyer	England	x	6.80	6.87	6.87	783		1606
10	John Heanley	England	6.40	x	6.85	6.85	778		1560
11	Selwin Lieutier	Mauritius	6.50	6.26	6.42	6.50	697		1507
12	Georgios Andreou	Cyprus	x	x	6.47	6.47	691		1583

=== Shot put ===
Rank	Athlete	Nationality	#1	#2	#3	Result	Points	Notes	Overall
1	Claston Bernard	Jamaica	14.86	15.37	15.26	15.37	812		2508
2	Georgios Andreou	Cyprus	14.77	14.38	x	14.77	776		2359
3	Michael Nolan	Canada	14.03	14.69	14.59	14.69	771		2393
4	Jamie Quarry	Scotland	14.23	14.68	14.09	14.68	770	PB	2456
5	Scott Ferrier	Australia	12.33	14.06	14.06	14.06	732		2455
6	Matthew McEwen	Australia	14.05	x	13.54	14.05	731		2395
7	Barry Thomas	England	13.19	x	13.28	13.28	684		2350
8	Anthony Sawyer	England	12.20	11.93	12.71	12.71	650		2256
9	Joseph Rodan	Fiji	12.06	11.39	x	12.06	610	PB	2204
10	Selwin Lieutier	Mauritius	11.68	x	11.52	11.68	587		2094
11	John Heanley	England	10.01	9.81	x	10.01	486		2046
12	Dale Garland	Guernsey	9.66	x	9.05	9.66	465		2175

=== High jump ===
Rank	Athlete	Nationality	1.73	1.76	1.79	1.82	1.85	1.88	1.91	1.94	1.97	2.00	2.03	2.06	2.09	2.15	2.18	Result	Points	Notes	Overall
1	Claston Bernard	Jamaica	–	–	–	–	–	–	–	–	o	–	o	o	xo	xxo	xxx	2.15	944		3452
2	Scott Ferrier	Australia	–	–	–	–	–	–	o	–	o	o	xxx					2.00	803		3258
3	John Heanley	England	–	–	o	–	o	o	xo	o	o	o	xxx					2.00	803	PB	2849
4	Georgios Andreou	Cyprus	–	–	–	–	o	–	o	o	xo	xxo	xxx					2.00	803		3162
5	Anthony Sawyer	England	–	–	–	–	o	xo	o	xo	o	xxo	xxx					2.00	803	PB	3059
6	Jamie Quarry	Scotland	–	–	–	o	o	o	o	xo	xxx							1.94	749		3205
7	Barry Thomas	England	–	–	–	o	o	o	xo	xo	xxx							1.94	749		3099
8	Matthew McEwen	Australia	–	–	–	o	–	o	o	xxx								1.91	723		3118
9	Joseph Rodan	Fiji	–	o	o	xo	o	xo	xxo	xxx								1.91	723	PB	2927
10	Dale Garland	Guernsey	o	–	o	o	o	o	xxx									1.88	696		2871
10	Selwin Lieutier	Mauritius	–	–	o	–	o	o	xxx									1.88	696		2790
12	Michael Nolan	Canada	–	–	–	o	–	xxx										1.82	644		3037

=== 400 metres ===
Rank	Heat	Name	Nationality	Time	Points	Notes	Overall
1	1	Dale Garland	Guernsey	47.80	919		3790
2	2	Anthony Sawyer	England	49.30	847		3906
3	2	John Heanley	England	49.44	841		3690
4	1	Claston Bernard	Jamaica	49.61	833		4285
5	1	Matthew McEwen	Australia	49.64	831		3949
6	1	Jamie Quarry	Scotland	50.10	810		4015
7	2	Georgios Andreou	Cyprus	50.87	775		3937
8	2	Selwin Lieutier	Mauritius	50.97	770		3560
9	2	Barry Thomas	England	50.99	770		3869
10	1	Michael Nolan	Canada	51.68	739		3776
11	2	Joseph Rodan	Fiji	52.78	691		3618
	1	Scott Ferrier	Australia	DNF	0		3258

=== 110 metres hurdles ===
Rank	Lane	Name	Nationality	Time	Points	Notes	Overall
1	2	Claston Bernard	Jamaica	14.63	895		5180
2	2	Jamie Quarry	Scotland	14.96	854		4869
3	1	Selwin Lieutier	Mauritius	15.04	854		4405
4	1	John Heanley	England	15.09	839		4529
5	1	Barry Thomas	England	15.11	836		4705
6	1	Matthew McEwen	Australia	15.21	824		4773
7	1	Georgios Andreou	Cyprus	15.39	803		4740
8	1	Dale Garland	Guernsey	15.50	790		4580
9	2	Anthony Sawyer	England	15.54	785		4691
10	2	Joseph Rodan	Fiji	15.88	746		4364
11	2	Michael Nolan	Canada	15.99	734		4510
	2	Scott Ferrier	Australia	DNS	0		3258

=== Discus throw ===
Rank	Athlete	Nationality	#1	#2	#3	Result	Points	Notes	Overall
1	Michael Nolan	Canada	45.90	45.04	47.60	47.60	821		5331
2	Georgios Andreou	Cyprus	35.57	42.96	44.36	44.36	754		5494
3	Claston Bernard	Jamaica	43.14	x	x	43.14	729		5909
4	Matthew McEwen	Australia	37.51	39.15	37.95	39.15	647		5420
5	Barry Thomas	England	39.11	x	38.34	39.11	646		5351
6	Jamie Quarry	Scotland	34.82	38.08	x	38.08	626		5495
7	Anthony Sawyer	England	23.86	35.31	29.84	35.31	570		5261
8	John Heanley	England	30.96	34.64	34.39	34.64	556		5085
9	Joseph Rodan	Fiji	31.35	32.53	28.90	32.53	514		4878
10	Selwin Lieutier	Mauritius	31.95	30.90	29.74	31.95	503		4908
11	Dale Garland	Guernsey	30.95	28.82	30.38	30.95	483	PB	5063

=== Pole vault ===
Rank	Group	Athlete	Nationality	2.85	3.05	3.15	3.25	3.35	3.45	3.55	3.65	3.75	3.85	3.95	4.05	4.15	4.25	4.35	4.45	4.55	4.65	4.75	4.85	4.95	Result	Points	Notes	Overall
1	B	Matthew McEwen	Australia	–	–	–	–	–	–	–	–	–	–	–	–	–	–	xo	–	o	o	o	xxo	xxx	4.85	865	PB	6285
2	B	Barry Thomas	England	–	–	–	–	–	–	–	–	–	–	–	–	–	–	xo	–	o	xxo	o	xxx		4.75	834		6185
3	B	Michael Nolan	Canada	–	–	–	–	–	–	–	–	–	–	–	–	–	–	o	–	xo	xxo	xxo	xxx		4.75	834		6165
4	B	Jamie Quarry	Scotland	–	–	–	–	–	–	–	–	–	–	–	–	–	o	–	o	o	xxo	xxx			4.65	804	PB	6299
5	A	Joseph Rodan	Fiji	–	–	–	–	–	–	–	–	–	xo	–	o	xo	o	o	o	xxx					4.45	746	PB	5624
6	B	Georgios Andreou	Cyprus	–	–	–	–	–	–	–	–	–	–	–	–	–	xxo	–	xo	–	xxx				4.45	746		6240
7	A	John Heanley	England	–	–	–	–	–	–	–	–	–	–	o	–	o	xo	xxx							4.25	688		5773
8	A	Anthony Sawyer	England	–	–	–	–	–	–	–	–	–	–	–	xo	xo	xxx								4.15	659		5920
9	A	Selwin Lieutier	Mauritius	–	–	–	–	–	–	–	xo	o	o	o	o	xo	x								4.15	659		5567
10	A	Claston Bernard	Jamaica	–	–	–	–	–	–	–	–	–	xo	–	xxx										3.85	576		6485
11	A	Dale Garland	Guernsey	o	o	o	o	o	xo	xxo	xxx														3.55	496	PB	5559

=== Javelin throw ===
Rank	Athlete	Nationality	#1	#2	#3	Result	Points	Notes	Overall
1	Matthew McEwen	Australia	56.74	56.21	59.91	59.91	736		7021
2	Georgios Andreou	Cyprus	58.57	57.36	54.49	58.57	716		6956
3	Michael Nolan	Canada	54.53	55.78	57.01	57.01	693		6858
4	Claston Bernard	Jamaica	56.34	55.40	55.68	56.34	683	PB	7168
5	Barry Thomas	England	x	54.09	51.34	54.09	649		6834
6	Selwin Lieutier	Mauritius	53.45	51.88	x	53.45	640		6207
7	Jamie Quarry	Scotland	43.50	50.69	48.91	50.69	599		6898
8	John Heanley	England	49.78	45.07	45.68	49.78	585		6358
9	Anthony Sawyer	England	46.48	46.08	48.11	48.11	561		6481
10	Dale Garland	Guernsey	44.12	44.57	45.94	45.94	529		6088
11	Joseph Rodan	Fiji	38.97	43.03	43.13	43.13	488		6112

=== 1500 metres ===
Rank	Name	Nationality	Time	Points	Notes
1	Dale Garland	Guernsey	4:17.22	831	
2	John Heanley	England	4:21.11	804	
3	Jamie Quarry	Scotland	4:31.94	732	
4	Anthony Sawyer	England	4:33.34	723	
5	Barry Thomas	England	4:35.01	712	
6	Matthew McEwen	Australia	4:42.68	664	
7	Claston Bernard	Jamaica	4:42.94	662	
8	Michael Nolan	Canada	4:46.25	641	
9	Selwin Lieutier	Mauritius	4:46.28	641	
10	Georgios Andreou	Cyprus	5:02.15	547	
11	Joseph Rodan	Fiji	5:09.32	507	

=== Final standings ===
The highest mark recorded in each event is highlighted in yellow

Rank	Athlete	Nationality	100m	LJ	SP	HJ	400m	110m H	DT	PV	JT	1500m	Points	Notes
1st place, gold medalist(s)	Claston Bernard	Jamaica	10.92	7.02	15.37	2.15	49.61	14.63	43.14	3.85	56.34	4:42.94	7830	
2nd place, silver medalist(s)	Matthew McEwen	Australia	11.12	7.07	14.05	1.91	49.64	15.21	39.15	4.85	59.91	4:42.68	7685	
3rd place, bronze medalist(s)	Jamie Quarry	Scotland	11.12	7.16	14.68	1.94	50.10	14.96	38.08	4.65	50.69	4:31.94	7630	SB
4	Barry Thomas	England	11.22	7.17	13.28	1.94	50.99	15.11	39.11	4.75	54.09	4:35.01	7546	PB
5	Georgios Andreou	Cyprus	10.86	6.47	14.77	2.00	50.87	15.39	44.36	4.45	58.57	5:02.15	7503	SB
6	Michael Nolan	Canada	11.35	7.10	14.69	1.82	51.68	15.99	47.60	4.75	57.01	4:46.25	7499	
7	Anthony Sawyer	England	11.17	6.87	12.71	2.00	49.30	15.54	35.31	4.15	48.11	4:33.34	7204	
8	John Heanley	England	11.36	6.85	10.01	2.00	49.44	15.09	34.64	4.25	49.78	4:21.11	7162	
9	Dale Garland	Guernsey	11.01	7.16	9.66	1.88	47.80	15.50	30.95	3.55	45.94	4:17.22	6919	
10	Selwin Lieutier	Mauritius	11.23	6.50	11.68	1.88	50.97	15.04	31.95	4.15	53.45	4:46.28	6848	
11	Joseph Rodan	Fiji	11.28	6.92	12.06	1.91	52.78	15.88	32.53	4.45	43.13	5:09.32	6619	
	Scott Ferrier	Australia	11.16	7.35	14.06	2.00	DNF	DNS	–	–	–	–	DNF	
