= Athletics at the 2006 Commonwealth Games – Men's decathlon =

Men's decathlon at the Commonwealth Games

The men's decathlon event at the 2006 Commonwealth Games was held on March 20–21.

== Medalists ==
Gold	Silver	Bronze
Dean Macey; England	Maurice Smith; Jamaica	Jason Dudley; Australia

== Results ==
=== 100 metres ===
Wind:
Heat 1: +0.2 m/s, Heat 2: –1.9 m/s

Rank	Heat	Name	Nationality	Time	Points	Notes
1	1	Maurice Smith	Jamaica	10.81	903	
2	1	Dale Garland	Guernsey	10.94	874	PB
3	1	Richard Allan	Australia	11.03	854	
4	1	Brent Newdick	New Zealand	11.09	841	PB
5	1	Dean Macey	England	11.17	823	
6	1	Matthew McEwen	Australia	11.18	821	
7	2	Jason Dudley	Australia	11.40	774	
8	2	Lee Okoroafo	Nigeria	11.57	738	
9	2	Jora Singh	India	11.61	730	
10	2	Guillaume Thierry	Mauritius	11.63	725	
11	2	Brendan McConville	Northern Ireland	11.88	675	

=== Long jump ===
Rank	Athlete	Nationality	#1	#2	#3	Result	Points	Notes	Overall
1	Dale Garland	Guernsey	6.99	x	7.36	7.36	900	PB	1774
2	Dean Macey	England	7.08	7.28	–	7.28	881		1704
3	Jason Dudley	Australia	x	7.27	7.10w	7.27	878		1652
4	Richard Allan	Australia	6.70	6.95	7.09w	7.09w	835		1689
5	Brent Newdick	New Zealand	7.04	7.00	6.92	7.04	823		1664
6	Maurice Smith	Jamaica	6.91	6.80	6.88	6.91	792		1695
7	Guillaume Thierry	Mauritius	x	6.56	6.86	6.86	781		1506
8	Matthew McEwen	Australia	6.36	6.33	6.67	6.67	736		1557
9	Lee Okoroafo	Nigeria	6.53	6.60	x	6.60	720		1458
10	Jora Singh	India	5.74	6.07	5.90	6.07	602		1332
	Brendan McConville	Northern Ireland				DNS	0		675

=== Shot put ===
Rank	Athlete	Nationality	#1	#2	#3	Result	Points	Notes	Overall
1	Dean Macey	England	14.97	x	15.83	15.83	841	PB	2545
2	Maurice Smith	Jamaica	x	15.09	14.39	15.09	795		2490
3	Jason Dudley	Australia	14.73	x	x	14.73	773		2425
4	Matthew McEwen	Australia	14.42	14.15	14.29	14.42	754		2311
5	Guillaume Thierry	Mauritius	13.68	x	12.89	13.68	709		2215
6	Brent Newdick	New Zealand	13.32	13.14	13.41	13.41	692		2356
7	Jora Singh	India	12.80	12.75	12.85	12.85	658		1990
8	Richard Allan	Australia	12.63	x	x	12.63	645		2334
9	Dale Garland	Guernsey	11.11	10.60	11.35	11.35	567	PB	2341
	Lee Okoroafo	Nigeria				DNS	0		1458

=== High jump ===
Rank	Athlete	Nationality	1.75	1.78	1.81	1.84	1.87	1.90	1.93	1.96	1.99	2.02	2.05	2.08	Result	Points	Notes	Overall
1	Dean Macey	England	–	–	–	–	o	–	o	–	o	o	xo	xo	2.08	878		3423
2	Jason Dudley	Australia	–	–	–	o	–	o	o	o	xxo	o	xxx		2.02	822	PB	3247
3	Brent Newdick	New Zealand	–	o	–	xo	–	o	xo	xxo	xxo	xxx			1.99	794	PB	3150
4	Richard Allan	Australia	–	–	o	–	o	o	xxx						1.90	714		3048
4	Dale Garland	Guernsey	–	o	–	o	o	o	xxx						1.90	714		3055
6	Matthew McEwen	Australia	–	o	o	o	xxo	xo	xxx						1.90	714		3025
7	Maurice Smith	Jamaica	–	–	o	–	o	xxo	xxx						1.90	714		3204
8	Jora Singh	India	o	xxo	xxx										1.78	610		2600
9	Guillaume Thierry	Mauritius	xxo	xxx											1.75	585		2800

=== 400 metres ===
Rank	Heat	Name	Nationality	Time	Points	Notes	Overall
1	2	Dale Garland	Guernsey	47.16	950		4005
2	2	Maurice Smith	Jamaica	49.35	845		4049
3	2	Dean Macey	England	49.63	832		4255
4	1	Jason Dudley	Australia	49.86	821		4068
5	2	Richard Allan	Australia	49.98	816		3864
6	2	Brent Newdick	New Zealand	50.68	784		3934
7	1	Matthew McEwen	Australia	51.08	765		3790
8	1	Guillaume Thierry	Mauritius	53.27	670		3470
	1	Jora Singh	India	DNS	0		2600

=== 110 metres hurdles ===
Wind: +0.1 m/s

Rank	Lane	Name	Nationality	Time	Points	Notes	Overall
1	1	Maurice Smith	Jamaica	14.33	932		4981
2	6	Jason Dudley	Australia	14.71	885		4953
3	4	Dale Garland	Guernsey	14.75	880	PB	4885
4	2	Brent Newdick	New Zealand	14.87	865	PB	4799
5	7	Dean Macey	England	14.94	857		5112
6	8	Matthew McEwen	Australia	15.07	841		4631
7	3	Richard Allan	Australia	15.19	827		4691
8	5	Guillaume Thierry	Mauritius	16.78	647		4117

=== Discus throw ===
Rank	Athlete	Nationality	#1	#2	#3	Result	Points	Notes	Overall
1	Maurice Smith	Jamaica	48.36	50.26	50.00	50.26	876		5857
2	Jason Dudley	Australia	49.73	x	50.10	50.10	872	PB	5825
3	Dean Macey	England	46.76	46.01	42.30	46.76	803	SB	5915
4	Richard Allan	Australia	41.24	43.84	44.89	44.89	765		5456
5	Guillaume Thierry	Mauritius	x	38.07	43.60	43.60	738		4855
6	Brent Newdick	New Zealand	41.09	x	41.92	41.92	704	PB	5503
7	Matthew McEwen	Australia	40.37	38.39	39.88	40.37	672		5303
8	Dale Garland	Guernsey	x	x	30.19	30.19	468		5353

=== Pole vault ===
Rank	Athlete	Nationality	3.60	3.70	3.80	4.00	4.10	4.20	4.30	4.40	4.50	4.60	4.70	4.80	Result	Points	Notes	Overall
1	Dean Macey	England	–	–	–	–	–	–	–	o	–	o	o	xxx	4.70	819	SB	6734
1	Brent Newdick	New Zealand	–	–	–	–	–	o	–	o	–	o	o	xxx	4.70	819		6322
3	Matthew McEwen	Australia	–	–	–	–	–	–	xo	–	o	–	xxx		4.50	760		6063
4	Richard Allan	Australia	–	–	–	–	–	xo	–	xxo	xo	xxx			4.50	760		6216
5	Jason Dudley	Australia	–	–	–	–	–	–	o	–	xxo	xxx			4.50	760		6585
6	Maurice Smith	Jamaica	–	–	–	–	–	xo	o	o	xxx				4.40	731	SB	6588
7	Guillaume Thierry	Mauritius	xo	–	o	o	–	xo	–	xxx					4.20	673		5528
8	Dale Garland	Guernsey	xo	o	–	xo	xxo	xxx							4.10	645	PB	5998

=== Javelin throw ===
Rank	Athlete	Nationality	#1	#2	#3	Result	Points	Notes	Overall
1	Jason Dudley	Australia	69.27	64.79	x	69.27	878	PB	7463
2	Maurice Smith	Jamaica	60.20	x	55.83	60.20	741	SB	7329
3	Matthew McEwen	Australia	55.84	57.42	51.44	57.42	699		6762
4	Dean Macey	England	56.93	–	–	56.93	692		7426
5	Guillaume Thierry	Mauritius	56.25	53.61	x	56.25	682		6210
6	Richard Allan	Australia	53.67	55.86	x	55.86	676	PB	6892
7	Dale Garland	Guernsey	52.24	54.38	52.33	54.38	654	PB	6652
8	Brent Newdick	New Zealand	45.88	50.14	x	50.14	591		6913

=== 1500 metres ===
Rank	Name	Nationality	Time	Points	Notes
1	Dale Garland	Guernsey	4:27.54	761	
2	Maurice Smith	Jamaica	4:29.95	745	SB
3	Dean Macey	England	4:34.22	717	
4	Brent Newdick	New Zealand	4:44.41	653	
5	Jason Dudley	Australia	5:03.82	538	
6	Guillaume Thierry	Mauritius	5:04.08	536	PB
7	Matthew McEwen	Australia	5:07.89	515	
8	Richard Allan	Australia	5:15.26	475	

=== Final standings ===
The highest mark recorded in each event is highlighted in yellow

Rank	Athlete	Nationality	100m	LJ	SP	HJ	400m	110m H	DT	PV	JT	1500m	Points	Notes
1st place, gold medalist(s)	Dean Macey	England	11.17	7.28	15.83	2.08	49.63	14.94	46.76	4.70	56.93	4:34.22	8143	
2nd place, silver medalist(s)	Maurice Smith	Jamaica	10.81	6.91	15.09	1.90	49.35	14.33	50.26	4.40	60.20	4:29.95	8074	
3rd place, bronze medalist(s)	Jason Dudley	Australia	11.40	7.27	14.73	2.02	49.86	14.71	50.10	4.50	69.27	5:03.82	8001	PB
4	Brent Newdick	New Zealand	11.09	7.04	13.41	1.99	50.68	14.87	41.92	4.70	50.14	4:44.41	7566	
5	Dale Garland	Guernsey	10.94	7.36	11.35	1.90	47.16	14.75	30.19	4.10	54.38	4:27.54	7413	PB
6	Richard Allan	Australia	11.03	7.09	12.63	1.90	49.98	15.19	44.89	4.50	55.86	5:15.26	7367	
7	Matthew McEwen	Australia	11.18	6.67	14.42	1.90	51.08	15.07	40.37	4.50	57.42	5:07.89	7277	
8	Guillaume Thierry	Mauritius	11.63	6.86	13.68	1.75	53.27	16.78	43.60	4.20	56.25	5:04.08	6746	
	Jora Singh	India	11.61	6.07	12.85	1.78	DNS	–	–	–	–	–	DNF	
	Lee Okoroafo	Nigeria	11.57	6.60	DNS	–	–	–	–	–	–	–	DNF	
	Brendan McConville	Northern Ireland	11.88	DNS	–	–	–	–	–	–	–	–	DNF	
