= Hedquist =

Hedquist is a Swedish surname. Notable people with the surname include:

- Christopher Hedquist (born 1980), American skeleton racer
- Lennart Hedquist (born 1943), Swedish politician

== See also ==
- Hedqvist
