= Tayama =

Tayama (written: 田山 lit. "ricefield mountain") is a Japanese surname. Notable people with the surname include:

- Hirokatsu Tayama (田山 寛豪, born 1981), Japanese triathlete
- Katai Tayama (田山 花袋, 1872–1930), Japanese writer
- Shinsuke Tayama (田山 真輔, born 1982), Japanese skeleton racer

== See also ==
- Tayama Station, a railway station in Hachimantai, Iwate Prefecture, Japan
