= Athletics at the 1999 Summer Universiade – Men's decathlon =

The men's decathlon event at the 1999 Summer Universiade was held 6–7 July at the Estadio Son Moix in Palma de Mallorca, Spain.

== Results ==
The highest mark recorded in each event is highlighted in yellow

Rank	Athlete	Nationality	100m	LJ	SP	HJ	400m	110m H	DT	PV	JT	1500m	Points	Notes
1st place, gold medalist(s)	Raúl Duany	Cuba	11.13	7.32	13.74	2.10	48.92	14.57	39.24	4.40	64.80	4:27.39	8050	
2nd place, silver medalist(s)	Stephen Moore	United States	10.86	7.49	12.70	2.10	47.77	14.85	40.05	4.60	55.61	4:30.05	8029	
3rd place, bronze medalist(s)	Benjamin Jensen	Norway	11.32	7.30	13.51	1.95	49.58	14.81	41.51	5.00	61.54	4:25.25	7982	
4	Zsolt Kürtösi	Hungary	11.32	7.26	15.55	2.04	50.62	14.91	44.74	4.60	61.52	4:51.10	7901	
5	Matthew McEwen	Australia	11.11w	6.84	13.86	2.07	49.77	15.27	40.64	4.30	58.81	4:57.33	7517	
6	Gaëtan Blouin	France	11.43	6.98	12.27	2.01	52.04	14.94	38.64	4.50	55.57	4:32.65	7387	
7	Roman Timchenko	Ukraine	11.76w	6.73	13.86	1.92	52.26	15.60	36.20	4.50	51.71	4:29.96	7098	
8	Aivo Normak	Estonia	11.33w	6.93	13.34	1.77	52.26	16.56	39.44	4.50	48.70	4:27.40	7004	
9	Jordan Hudgens	United States	10.87	6.86w	11.41	1.92	47.82	14.47	36.12	NM	50.88	4:32.13	6725	
10	Christo Blignaut	South Africa	10.92w	6.91w	12.03	1.80	DQ	15.30	36.33	NM	43.27	4:39.15	5485	
	Mohd Malik Ahmad Tobias	Malaysia	11.42	7.24	13.51	1.92	56.27	15.00	36.86	NM	DNS	–	DNF	
	Georgios Andreou	Cyprus	10.97	7.02w	14.48	1.89	DNS	–	–	–	–	–	DNF	
	Tom Erik Olsen	Norway	10.75	7.20	DNS	–	–	–	–	–	–	–	DNF	
	Patrik Melin	Sweden	11.45w	6.99	NM	DNS	–	–	–	–	–	–	DNF	
	Jiří Ryba	Czech Republic	DNSw	–	–	–	–	–	–	–	–	–	DNS	
