= Patrick Shannon =

Patrick Shannon may refer to:

- Patrick Joseph Shannon (1902–1963), law enforcement officer
- Patrick Shannon (mayor) (1824–1871), mayor of Kansas City, Missouri, 1864–1865
- Patrick Shannon (skeleton racer) (born 1977), Irish skeleton racer

== See also ==
- Pat Shannon (disambiguation)
