= Dean Macey =

English athlete (born 1977)

Personal information
- Nickname: The Dean Machine
- Born: 12 December 1977 (age 48) Rochford, Essex, England
- Height: 1.96 m (6 ft 5 in)

Sport
- Event: Decathlon
- Club: Harrow

Achievements and titles
- Personal best: 8603 points
Medal record
Men's athletics
World Championships
Silver medal – second place	1999 Seville	Decathlon
Bronze medal – third place	2001 Edmonton	Decathlon
Commonwealth Games
Representing England
Gold medal – first place	2006 Melbourne	Decathlon

Dean Macey (born 12 December 1977) is an English athlete from Canvey Island. He is best known for competing in the decathlon, which he did from 1995 to 2008, winning the Commonwealth Games decathlon, two World Championship medals, as well as twice finishing fourth in the Olympic Games. Retiring from decathlon due to injury, he competed in the bobsleigh between 2008 and 2010.

A popular media figure during and after his athletics career, he is a keen angler and has presented an angling television series "On Coarse" for the Discovery Channel, and "Fishing Allstars" on ITV4. He has also set a record time (0:56) on the Total Wipeout Qualifier. After his athletics and bobsleigh careers being a keen Angler he went on to make a series of fishing videos on YouTube and was sponsored by Guru.

== Track and Field career ==
Macey was born in Rochford, Essex. He started out in athletics as a high jumper, triple jumper and javelin thrower but graduated up through the octathlon to settle on the decathlon. He was also on the books of Arsenal as a youngster but gave up football to train for the World Junior Championships in 1995. Macey's major breakthrough was when he won silver medal at the 1999 World Championships in Athletics in the Olympic Stadium, Seville, Spain with a personal best of 8556 points finishing behind gold medallist Tomáš Dvořák of the Czech Republic. Macey was the inaugural winner of BBC Sports Personality of the Year Young Personality in 1999.

The following year at the 2000 Summer Olympics, Sydney, Australia, after an injury ravaged year, Macey recorded another personal best score of 8567 points but could only finish fourth. The title was won by Estonian, Erki Nool but only after an appeal when earlier in the day the referee overruled his field judges and ruled out Erki's discus throw of 43.66 metres. The appeal was successful and the Estonian took gold ahead of the Czech, Roman Šebrle and American Chris Huffins.

Macey was back amongst the medals at the 2001 World Championships in the Commonwealth Stadium, Edmonton, Alberta, Canada, improving on his personal best yet again, with 8603 points finishing with the bronze medal, once again behind Tomáš Dvořák (gold medal), and Erki Nool (silver medal).

Injuries forced Macey to miss the 2002 Commonwealth Games, held at the City of Manchester Stadium, Manchester, England and all other major competitions until making his comeback at Hexham, England, July 2004. He worked for BBC TV during the Commonwealth Games.

His score in Hexham of 7842 points was, purposely, just enough to meet the B qualifying standard of 7700 for the upcoming Summer Olympic Games.

At the 2004 Summer Olympics in Athens, Greece Dean performed well, in view of the recent years away from competition, but with a possible medal in his grasp, a below par pole vault and javelin throw once again left him in fourth place at an Olympic competition behind Roman Šebrle (gold), Bryan Clay (silver) and Dmitriy Karpov (bronze).

At the 2006 Commonwealth Games, despite still nursing some injuries, Macey led after the first day with a personal best of 15.83 metres in the last round of the shot put. Over the course of the second day, that gap was reduced and overhauled by the Australian Jason Dudley because of injury-hampered performances in the 110 m hurdles and the javelin. Going into the final event, the 1500 metres, Macey needed to score 38 points more than Dudley to claim gold. He completed the event in 4:34.22, which gave him the gold medal by 69 points. Dean finished with a total of 8,143 points, ahead of the Jamaican Maurice Smith (silver) and Dudley (bronze).

In 2008 after a failure to reach the B Qualifying standard for the 2008 Olympic Games, at the Hexham International Combined Events Meeting, Macey admitted that he was considering his future. Young decathlete Daniel Awde was selected for the Olympics. On 15 July, he decided to retire from athletics. Macey wrote a regular Olympic column in the Southend Echo newspaper entitled "Deano's Diary" in which he shared his views on the Beijing Games.

In 2009, Dean Macey completed the Men's Health Survival of the Fittest 10 km run in Edinburgh, Scotland, recording a time in excess of 1 hour 15 minutes.

Macey worked as part of the commentary team for BBC Radio 5 Live's coverage of the 2010 Commonwealth Games and Al Jazeera Sports' coverage of the 2010 Asian Games, as well as Channel 4's screening of the 2012 IAAF World Indoor Championships.

== Personal bests ==
Information from World Athletics profile unless otherwise noted.

As of 3 July 2025

Event	Performance	Location	Date
1500 metres	3:55.00	Watford	11 July 2007

Event	Performance	Location	Date	Points
Decathlon	—N/a	Sydney	7 August 2001	8,603 points
100 metres	10.69 (-0.2 m/s)	Sevilla	24 August 1999	931 points
Long jump	7.77 m (25 ft 5 3/4 in) (-0.5 m/s)	Sydney	27 September 2000	1,068 points
Shot put	15.83 m (51 ft 11 in)	Melbourne	20 March 2006	841 points
High jump	2.15 m (7 ft 1/2 in)	Edmonton	6 August 2001	944 points
400 metres	46.21	Edmonton	6 August 2001	998 points
110 metres hurdles	14.34 (+0.0 m/s)	Edmonton	7 August 2001	931 points
Discus throw	48.34 m (158 ft 7 in)	Athens	24 August 2004	836 points
Pole vault	4.80 m (15 ft 8 3/4 in)	Sydney	28 September 2000	849 points
Javelin throw	64.03 m (210 ft 3/4 in)	Sevilla	25 August 1999	799 points
1500 metres	4:23.45	Sydney	28 September 2000	788 points
Virtual Best Performance				8,919 points

== Bobsleigh career ==
After his retirement from athletics, Macey accepted a challenge to attempt to qualify for the 2010 Winter Olympics in the bobsleigh. He trained with former sprinter Jason Gardener. The pair finished sixth in the two-man event at the 2008 British Bobsleigh Championships held in Cesana Pariol, Italy. Subsequently, he worked for Eurosport as a regular part of the commentary team for the channel's bobsleigh coverage.
