= Drocco =

Drocco is a surname. Notable people with the surname include:

- David Drocco (born 1989), Argentine footballer
- Nicola Drocco (born 1979), Italian skeleton racer
