= Korobkin =

Korobkin (Russian: Коробкин, from коробка meaning box) is a Russian masculine surname, its feminine counterpart is Korobkina. It may refer to

- Inna Korobkina (born 1981), Russian actress
- Olga Korobkina (born 1989), Russian skeleton racer
- Valeri Korobkin (born 1984), Kazakhstani football player
- Vladyslav Korobkin (born 1983), Ukrainian football striker
- Yelena Korobkina (born 1990), Russian middle-distance runner
