= Setina (disambiguation) =

Setina is a genus of moths.

Setina may also refer to:

- Skopos, a village in northern Greece formerly known as Setina
- Anže Šetina (born 1986), Slovene skeleton racer
