= Penz =

Penz may refer to:

- Alain Penz (born 1947), a French former alpine skier
- Claude Penz (born 1924), a French former alpine skier who competed in the 1948 Winter Olympics
- Markus Penz (born 1975), an Austrian skeleton racer who has competed since 2002
- Peter Penz (born 1984), an Austrian luger who has competed since 2003
