= Hedqvist =

Hedqvist is a Swedish surname. People named Hedqvist include:

- Birger Hedqvist (1894–1964), officer
- Ebba Hedqvist (born 2006), ice hockey player
- Ivan Hedqvist (1880–1935), actor and director
- Joakim Hedqvist (born 1977), bandy player
- Karl-Johan Hedqvist (1917–2009), entomologist
- Paul Hedqvist (1895–1977), architect
- Paulina Hedqvist (born 1995), footballer

== See also ==
- Hedquist
