= Athletics at the 1997 Summer Universiade – Men's decathlon =

The men's decathlon event at the 1997 Summer Universiade was held at the Stadio Cibali in Catania, Italy, on 29 and 30 August.

== Results ==
The highest mark recorded in each event is highlighted in yellow

Rank	Athlete	Nationality	100m	LJ	SP	HJ	400m	110m H	DT	PV	JT	1500m	Points	Notes
1st place, gold medalist(s)	Roman Šebrle	Czech Republic	10.70	7.72	15.09	2.07	48.75	14.48	42.34	4.80	65.60	4:48.31	8380	
2nd place, silver medalist(s)	Kamil Damašek	Czech Republic	11.05	7.01	15.30	2.01	47.95	15.20	42.18	5.00	56.44	4:29.87	8072	
3rd place, bronze medalist(s)	Marcel Dost	Netherlands	10.95	7.15	13.91	1.92	49.69	14.85	40.74	5.20	56.76	4:39.19	7899	
4	Oleksandr Yurkov	Ukraine	10.95	7.27	14.13	1.89	50.12	15.17	47.82	5.00	50.28	4:41.49	7828	
5	Wilfrid Boulineau	France	11.14	7.22	12.93	2.01	49.59	15.33	41.52	4.60	61.16	4:26.60	7824	
6	Zsolt Kürtösi	Hungary	11.17	7.19	14.94	1.89	50.60	14.80	41.94	4.70	54.58	4:34.91	7727	
7	Valeriy Belousov	Russia	11.31	7.07	14.58	1.98	52.01	14.79	38.98	4.80	61.88	4:41.52	7701	
8	Dmitri Sukhomazov	Belarus	11.19	6.81	14.54	2.13	50.82	15.22	39.80	4.60	62.22	4:59.35	7658	
9	Trond Høiby	Norway	11.27	6.57	13.76	1.86	50.12	15.19	41.42	4.70	62.58	4:31.91	7564	
10	Michael Nolan	Canada	11.19	6.96	13.80	1.92	49.93	14.86	43.66	4.80	48.00	4:57.37	7477	
11	Matt McEwen	Australia	10.87	6.91	14.32	1.95	49.35	16.23	39.24	NM	58.72	4:55.62	6693	
12	Hamid Asiabi	Iran											5847	
	Peter Banks	Australia	11.10	7.37	13.29	1.95	48.94	16.04	35.92	DNS	–	–	DNF	
	Chen Chien-hung	Chinese Taipei											DNF	
	Chiel Warners	Netherlands		7.42									DNF	
	Billy Schuffenhauer	United States	11.09										DNF	
	Jarkko Finni	Finland											DNF	
	Sándór Munkácsi	Hungary											DNF	
	Jamie Quarry	Great Britain											DNF	
	Benjamin Jensen	Norway											DNF	
	Patrik Sandberg	Sweden											DNF	
	Lin Shang-chuan	Chinese Taipei											DNF	
