= Kristan Bromley =

British skeleton racer (born 1972)

Personal information
- Born: 7 March 1972 (age 54) Rossendale, Lancashire, England
- Height: 178 cm (5 ft 10 in)
- Weight: 75 kg (165 lb)
Medal record
Skeleton
Representing Great Britain
World Championships
Gold medal – first place	2008 Altenberg	Men
Skeleton World Cup
Gold medal – first place	2003-2004	men
Gold medal – first place	2007-2008	men
Bronze medal – third place	1999-2000	men
European Skeleton Championships
Gold medal – first place	2004 Altenberg	men
Gold medal – first place	2005 Altenberg	men
Gold medal – first place	2008 St Moritz	men
Silver medal – second place	2009 St Moritz	men

Kristan Bromley (born 7 March 1972) is a retired British skeleton racer who has competed since 1996. He won the gold medal in the men's event at the 2008 FIBT World Championships in Altenberg, Germany. This was Great Britain's first gold medal at the FIBT World Championships since 1965.

Competing in four Winter Olympics, Bromley's best finish was fifth in the men's skeleton event at Turin in 2006.

He has twice won the men's overall Skeleton World Cup title (2003-4, 2007-08).

In 2008 he became the first man in history to win the World Championship, European Championship and World Cup in the same season.

In September 2015 Bromley announced his retirement from the sport.

== FIBT World Cup: 2009/10 Season ==
Kristan finished the season in 6th place overall in the World Cup. Highlights of the season were a bronze medal in Park City and a silver medal in St. Moritz. The season's results were;

Round 1: Park City, USA Bronze Medal (3rd place) Round 2: Lake Placid, USA 9th place Round 3: Cesana (Torino), Italy 16th place (after problem on start) Round 4: Winterberg, Germany 6th place Round 5: Altenberg, Germany 13th place Round 6: Konigssee, Germany 4th place Round 7: St Moritz, Switzerland Silver Medal (2nd place) Round 8: Igls, Austria 8th place. The Igls race also counted as the 2010 European Championships, and Kristan finished in 7th place.

== 2010 Winter Olympics ==
On 29 January 2010, Kristan was officially announced as part of the Team GB Skeleton Bobsleigh squad to compete at the 2010 Winter Olympics in Vancouver, Canada. Other squad members included Adam Pengilly, with Shelley Rudman and Amy Williams in the women's competition. Bromley finished sixth in the men's event.

== Skeleton sled work ==
Nicknamed Doctor Ice by the British media because he earned a PhD from the University of Nottingham in 1999 with a thesis entitled "Factors affecting the performance of skeleton bobsleds".

He appeared in an episode of Discovery Channel's Building the Winter Games documentary, showing his preparation for the 2006 Winter Olympics, building his sled, and being introduced to the Cesana Pariol bobsleigh, luge, and skeleton track for the first time.

Kristan raced on sleds designed and produced with his brother Richard by their company, Bromley Technologies Ltd. In 2007, Kristan and the company relocated from Bath to the Sheffield area. Kristan trained at the English Institute of Sport in Sheffield whilst the sleds were manufactured in the city.

Kristan was supported by Bromley Technologies' Formula Ice 2010 programme, which supported Kristan, Shelley Rudman and Nicola Minichiello (Bobsleigh).

He was the coach of Dutch skeleton racer Kimberley Bos when she won the bronze medal at 2022 Winter Olympics.

== Personal life ==
Kristan Bromley, known as "Dr Ice", graduated with a BEng in Mechanical Design, Materials and Manufacture from The University of Nottingham in 1994, before earning his Ph.D. in materials engineering after writing a thesis called Factors Affecting the Performance of Skeleton Bobsleigh

Bromley is married to Shelley Rudman, who won the silver medal in the women's skeleton event at the 2006 games in Turin. Rudman received her medal while Bromley was competing in the men's skeleton event. He has two daughters with Rudman, Ella Rudman, born in October 2007, and Sofia Rudman-Bromley, born January 2015.

Bromley was sponsored by the global marketing agency, GyroHSR, and King of Shaves.

== Career Results ==
=== Olympic Games ===
Event	Men's Skeleton
Representing Great Britain
(United States) 2002 Salt Lake City	13th
(Italy) 2006 Turin	5th
(Canada) 2010 Vancouver	6th
(Russia) 2014 Sochi	8th

== Other sources ==
- BBC.co.uk article on Bromley's research
- BBC.co.uk profile on Bromley for the 2002 Winter Olympics
- BBC Sport Assessment of Medal hopes at 2006 Winter Olympics
- Shave.com profile
- Skeletonsport.com profile
- List of men's skeleton World Cup champions since 1987
- 2002 men's skeleton results
- 2006 men's skeleton results
