= Snorre Pedersen =

Norwegian skeleton racer (born 1972)

Snorre Pedersen (born 3 July 1972) is a Norwegian skeleton racer who competed from 1997 to 2005. He finished 14th in the men's skeleton event at the 2002 Winter Olympics in Salt Lake City. He also competed in the luge at the 1992 Winter Olympics.

Pedersen is the husband and coach of Swiss skeleton racer Maya, having first met at the 1999 FIBT World Championships in Altenberg, Germany. They were married in 2000 and have two children the oldest born in 2004.The youngest was born in 2008.

He is also a carpenter and owns a sporting goods store in Lillehammer, Norway. Additionally, Pedersen designed a skeleton sled for his wife which she used to win the women's skeleton FIBT World Championship event at Calgary in 2001.
