= Matthew McEwen =

Australian decathlete (born 1971)

Personal information
- Born: 16 October 1971 (age 55) Brisbane, Australia

Sport
- Sport: Decathlon
Medal record
Representing Australia
Commonwealth Games
Silver medal – second place	2002 Manchester	Decathlon

Matthew "Matt" McEwen (born 16 October 1971) is an Australian decathlete.

He won silver at the 2002 Commonwealth Games in Manchester, placed seventh at the 2006 Commonwealth Games in Melbourne and was three times Australian champion.

== Competition record ==
Year	Competition	Venue	Position	Event	Notes
Representing Australia
1997	Universiade	Catania, Italy	11th	Decathlon	6693 pts
1999	Universiade	Palma de Mallorca, Spain	5th	Decathlon	7517 pts
2002	Commonwealth Games	Manchester, United Kingdom	2nd	Decathlon	7685 pts
2006	Commonwealth Games	Melbourne, Australia	7th	Decathlon	7277 pts
