= Pat Shannon =

Pat Shannon may refer to:

- Pat Shannon, see 2010 in Ireland#Winter Olympics
- Pat Shannon, see Come to the Sunshine: Soft Pop Nuggets from the WEA Vaults

== See also ==
- Patrick Shannon (disambiguation)
