= Claston Bernard =

Jamaican decathlete

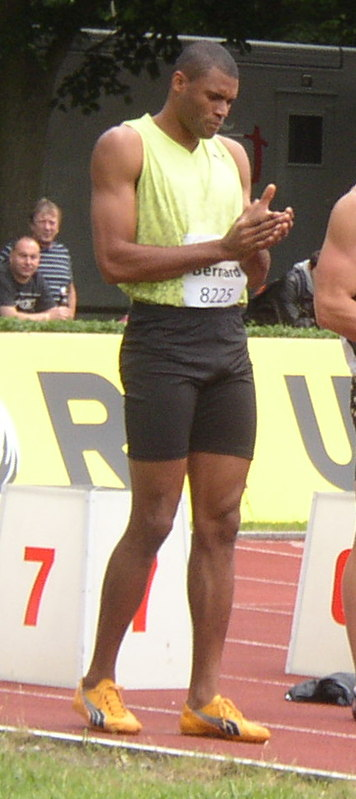

Personal details
- Born: 22 March 1979 (age 46); St. Elizabeth, Jamaica
- Political party: Republican
- Education: Louisiana State University (BA)

Claston Bernard
Medal record

Athletics

Representing Jamaica

Commonwealth Games
Gold medal – first place	2002 Manchester	Decathlon

CAC Championships
Gold medal – first place	2005 Nassau	Decathlon

CAC Junior Championships (U20)
Gold medal – first place	1998 George Town	Decathlon

CARIFTA Games Junior (U20)
Silver medal – second place	1998 Port of Spain	Shot put
Bronze medal – third place	1997 Bridgetown	Shot put

CARIFTA Games Youth (U17)
Gold medal – first place	1995 George Town	Shot put

Claston Bernard (born 22 March 1979 in St. Elizabeth) is a Jamaican-American decathlete. He won Commonwealth Gold in 2002. His personal best in decathlon is 8290 points, achieved in May 2005 in Götzis.

Bernard ran track collegiately at Louisiana State University.

In 2021, Bernard ran for the United States House of Representatives as a Republican in Louisiana's second congressional district, coming in fourth place with 9.8% of the vote.

== Achievements ==
Year	Competition	Venue	Position	Event	Notes
Representing Jamaica
1998	World Junior Championships	Annecy, France	13th	Decathlon	6769 pts
2002	Commonwealth Games	Manchester, England	1st	Decathlon	7830 pts
2003	Hypo-Meeting	Götzis, Austria	8th	Decathlon	7815 pts
2003	World Championships	Paris, France	9th	Decathlon	8000 pts
2004	Hypo-Meeting	Götzis, Austria	12th	Decathlon	8026 pts
2004	Olympic Games	Athens, Greece	9th	Decathlon	8225 pts (NR)
2005	CAC Championships	Nassau, Bahamas	1st	Decathlon	7877 pts
2005	World Championships	Helsinki, Finland	–	Decathlon	DNF
2007	Hypo-Meeting	Götzis, Austria	–	Decathlon	DNF
2009	Hypo-Meeting	Götzis, Austria	–	Decathlon	DNF
2009	CAC Championships	Havana, Cuba	3rd	Decathlon	7698 pts
2011	CAC Championships	Mayagüez, Puerto Rico	2nd	Decathlon	7299 pts
2011	Pan American Games	Guadalajara, Mexico	8th	Decathlon	7246 pts
