= Jamie Quarry =

British decathlete

Personal information
- Nationality: British (Scottish)
- Born: James Stephen Quarry; 15 November 1972 (age 53) Falkirk, Scotland, Great Britain

Sport
- Sport: Athletics
- Event: Decathlon
- Club: Blackheath Harriers
Medal record
Representing Scotland
Commonwealth Games
Bronze medal – third place	2002 Manchester	Decathlon

James Stephen "Jamie" Quarry (born 15 November 1972) is a British former decathlete.

== Biography ==
Quarry was raised in England and qualified to represent Scotland as his mother is from Stirling. He is also of Jamaican descent, with his father's cousin being Olympic gold medalist Don Quarrie.

Involved in multiple sports growing up, Quarry captained a Crystal Palace schoolboys team in football and was selected to represent Kent in rugby union. He competed in his first decathlon at the age of 14.

A three-time Commonwealth Games representative, Quarry earned a bronze medal at his farewell appearance in Manchester in 2002, which was Scotland's first-ever medal in the event. His previous Commonwealth Games finishes were eighth in 1994 (Victoria) and tenth in 1998 (Kuala Lumpur).

Quarry was involved in Glasgow's successful bid to host the 2014 Commonwealth Games.
