= Scott Ferrier =

Australian decathlete

Scott William Ferrier (born 12 June 1974 in Melbourne, Victoria) is a former decathlete from Australia, who represented his native country at two consecutive Summer Olympics, starting in 1996. An alumnus of Trinity Grammar School, Ferrier competed for the Old Melburnians Athletics club and was a two-time Australian champion in the men's decathlon, he married Olympic teammate and high jumper Alison Inverarity in 2000.

== Achievements ==
Year	Competition	Venue	Position	Notes
Representing Australia
1996	Olympic Games	Atlanta, Georgia	DNF	—
1998	Commonwealth Games	Kuala Lumpur, Malaysia	2nd	8307
1999	Hypo-Meeting	Götzis, Austria	DNF	—
2000	Olympic Games	Sydney, Australia	DNF	—
2002	Commonwealth Games	Manchester, England	DNF	—
