= Maggie Davies =

British skeleton racer

Maggie Davies (born 2 October 1984) is a British skeleton racer who has competed since 2004. Her best Skeleton World Cup finish was seventh at Winterberg in February 2008.

Davies' best finish at the FIBT World Championships was ninth in the women's event at Altenberg in 2008.
