= Paul Boehm =

Canadian skeleton racer

Paul Boehm (born August 10, 1974, in Calgary, Alberta) is a Canadian skeleton racer who has competed since 1998. He finished fourth in the men's skeleton event at the 2006 Winter Olympics in Turin.

Boehm's best finish at the FIBT World Championships was 14th in the men's skeleton event at St. Moritz in 2007.
