= Jason Dudley =

Australian decathlete

Personal information
- Born: 10 November 1984 (age 42)

Sport
- Country: Australia
- Sport: Athletics
- Event: Decathlon
Medal record
Commonwealth Games
Bronze medal – third place	2006 Melbourne	Decathlon

Jason Dudley (born 10 November 1984) is an Australian former decathlete.

Dudley was based in Queensland and coached by Eric Brown.

In 2001, Dudley was a bronze medalist in the octathlon at the 2001 World Youth Championships in Hungary.

At the 2006 Commonwealth Games in Melbourne, Dudley scored 8001 points in the decathlon to finish in the bronze medal position. He had held the lead going into the final phase after setting a personal best to win the javelin event, but fell two places by only finishing fifth in the 1,500 metres race.

Dudley was national champion in the decathlon in 2006 and 2008.
