= Anthony Deane (skeleton racer) =

Australian skeleton racer

Anthony Deane (born 3 July 1984) is an Australian skeleton athlete who has competed since 2009. He has two victories in North American Cup events, both earned at Calgary in December 2009.

Deane qualified for the 2010 Winter Olympics, finishing 23rd after only 18 months in the sports.
