= Cho In-ho =

South Korean skeleton racer (born 1978)

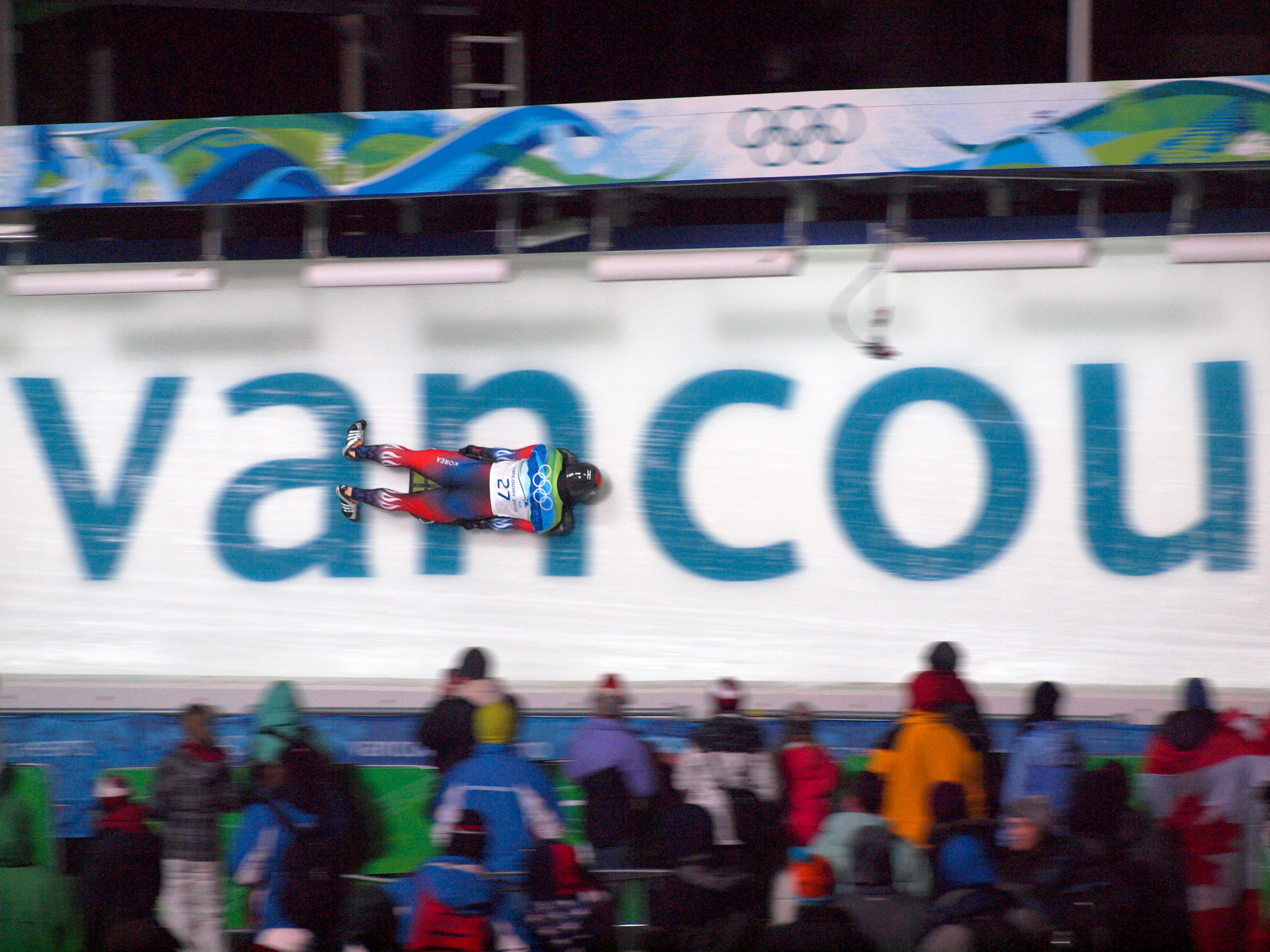
Cho In-ho at the Olympic Games in 2010

Cho In-Ho (Korean: 조인호; born June 24, 1978) is a South Korean skeleton racer who has competed from 2006 to 2010. He finished 26th in the men's event at the FIBT World Championships 2008 in Altenberg, Germany. He qualified for the 2010 Winter Olympics, finishing 22nd.

Cho's best career finish was third in an America's Cup competition, a lesser event of the Skeleton World Cup, in Park City, Utah in 2008.
