= Christopher Hedquist =

American skeleton racer (born 1980)

Christopher Hedquist (born June 4, 1980, Salt Lake City, Utah) is an American skeleton racer. In 2004 he won the overall European Cup, becoming the first American ever to win the title. He won gold at the 2005 World University Games in Innsbruck, Austria, the inaugural event for skeleton at the Games. He was an alternate in the 2006 Winter Olympics in Torino, Italy and retired following the 2007 World Cup season.

Chris initially started competing on ice in the sport of luge at age 12, but quit to pursue his freestyle skiing endeavors. He switched entirely to skeleton (sport) in 2002 following its introduction into the Olympic program. In his rookie season, he won a bronze at the U.S. National Championships, and was the top U.S. finisher at the Junior World Championships 2003 in Königssee where he placed fourth.

He started the 2006 Olympic season winning five consecutive gold medals at the European and America's Cup races. Hedquist narrowly missed the qualification for the 2006 Olympic Games in Turin after not competing in the final World Cup Olympic qualifier in Germany, and was named an alternate to the 2006 team. The Olympic selection by the U.S. skeleton federation came on the heels of several controversies including the doping suspension of teammate Zach Lund, and firing of the head coach over allegations of sexual harassment. During the games, Hedquist assumed a head coaching position for fellow Irish athlete David Connolly and South African Tyler Botha, who raced to a 20th and 21st place respectively.

Since 2006, he starts regularly for the U.S. on the World Cup tour. He finished the 2006/2007 season ranked 7th overall in World Cup points. He participated in his first FIBT World Championships in 2007 in St. Moritz, Switzerland, where he placed twentieth.

Career highlights include: Gold - 2005 World University Games in Innsbruck, 2004 Overall European Cup Champion, Bronze - 2003 and 2004 U.S. National Championships, 4th- 2003 Junior World Championships, ranked 7th overall 2006-2007 World Cup
