= Paulina Hedqvist =

Swedish footballer

Lina Hedqvist
Personal information
- Full name: Paulina Hedqvist
- Date of birth: 2 June 1995 (age 31)
- Position: Midfielder

Senior career*
Years	Team	Apps	(Gls)
2014–2016	Piteå IF	12	(0)
- * Club domestic league appearances and goals

Paulina "Lina" Hedqvist (born 2 June 1995) is a Swedish football midfielder currently playing for Piteå IF in the Damallsvenskan.
