= Maya Pedersen-Bieri =

Swiss-Norwegian skeleton racer

Maya Pedersen
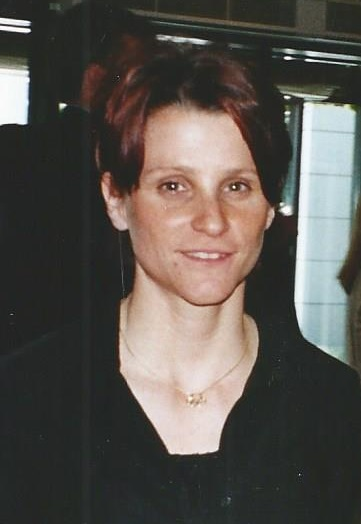

Personal information
- Born: Maya Bieri; 27 November 1972 (age 53) Spiez, Switzerland
- Height: 162 cm (5 ft 4 in)
- Weight: 58 kg (128 lb)
- Website: www.maya-pedersen.ch
Medal record
Skeleton
Representing Switzerland
Olympic Games
| Gold medal – first place | 2006 Turin | Women |
World Championships
| Gold medal – first place | 2001 Calgary | Women |
| Gold medal – first place | 2005 Calgary | Women |
| Silver medal – second place | 2007 St. Moritz | Women |
| Silver medal – second place | 2009 Lake Placid | Mixed team |
| Bronze medal – third place | 2007 St. Moritz | Mixed team |

Maya Pedersen-Bieri (born 27 November 1972 in Spiez) is a Swiss-Norwegian skeleton racer who has competed since 1995. She won the gold medal in the women's skeleton event at the 2006 Winter Olympics in Turin. She retired from the sport in 2010 before returning to compete for Norway (the country of her husband and coach, Snorre Pedersen) in 2016, becoming at the oldest woman to start a World Cup race when she returned to the top level of skeleton in 2017. She is listed in the International Bobsleigh and Skeleton Federation athlete registration system as Maya Pedersen.

Born in Spiez, Switzerland, Pedersen-Bieri is married to Snorre Pedersen (who is her trainer), has two children, both of her children are females and lives in Øyer Municipality near Lillehammer, Norway.

== Notable results ==
Before retiring in 2010, Pederen-Bieri was one of the most successful skeleton athletes in the world. Pedersen-Bieri won the FIBT World Championships in the women's skeleton event in 2001 and 2005, and earned two medals at the 2007 FIBT World Championships in St. Moritz with a silver in the women's skeleton and a bronze in the mixed bobsleigh-skeleton team event. Pedersen-Bieri also won a silver in the mixed team event at the 2009 championships.

Pedersen-Bieri was European champion in 2006 (in St. Moritz). She won the women's overall Skeleton World Cup in 1997-08. Pedersen-Bieri also finished fifth in the women's skeleton event at the 2002 Winter Olympics in Salt Lake City. She returned to competition for the 2008-09 Skeleton World Cup after sitting out the 2007-08 season to maternity leave. She finished third in her return at the 2008-09 event in Altenberg, Germany on December 5, 2008. Pedersen-Bieri qualified for the 2010 Winter Olympics, finishing ninth, after which she retired.

In 2016, Pedersen-Bieri began a comeback, sliding now for Norway, racing on the two Continental Cup circuits (best result, third in Park City) and the Intercontinental Cup. She represented Norway at the IBSF World Championships 2017 in Königssee where she missed the cut and finished 24th. She returned to the World Cup circuit for the 2017–18 season, missing the cut in the first five races but still earning 19th place in the European Championship race at Igls.

== Other sources ==
- "Huber edges Szymkowiak in Altenberg World Cup". International Bobsleigh & Skeleton Federation. 5 December 2008. Accessed 6 December 2008.
- 2002 women's skeleton results (todor66.com)
- Women's skeleton Olympic medalists since 2002 (sports123.com)
