= Grégory Saint-Géniès =

French skeleton racer (born 1977)

Grégory Saint-Géniès (born 23 May 1977 in Maisons-Alfort) is a French skeleton racer who has competed since 2002. His best World Cup finish was 18th in the men's event twice (2005, 2009).

Saint-Géniès' best finish at the FIBT World Championships was 16th in the men's event at St. Moritz in 2007.

He competed at the 2010 Winter Olympics where he finished 15th.
