= Amy Gough =

Canadian skeleton racer

Amy Gough (born August 24, 1977, in Williams Lake, British Columbia) is a Canadian skeleton racer who has competed since 2002. Her best result in a Skeleton World Cup event was first at Winterberg, Germany, in December 2011, while her best overall finish in a Skeleton World Cup was fifth in the 2010–11 Skeleton World Cup.

Gough's best finish at the FIBT World Championships was fourth in the mixed bobsleigh-skeleton team event at St. Moritz in 2007.

She qualified for the 2010 Winter Olympics, finishing seventh in the women's skeleton event.
