= Iain Roberts =

British-born New Zealand skeleton racer

Iain Roberts (born 16 May 1979 in Lichfield) is a British-born, New Zealand skeleton racer, who has competed since 2003.

His international racing career continued from 2003 up to 2010 and included 57 international appearances, 7 podium placements, three World Championships and the 2010 Winter Olympic Games.

The high point of his career was during the 2008 Intercontinental Cup where he achieved multiple top 10 finishes, including podium positions alongside Olympic medallists from the 2006 Torino Olympics.

The IBSF records show that, at the Winterberg World Cup leading up to the Olympics, Iain Roberts achieved 6th position in training. A form he was able to later replicate in the St Moritz World Cup after the first competition run.

His best World Cup finish was in Königssee in January 2010 where he was placed 16th after the first run, only 0.05 seconds behind 14th place and completed the event in 18th position after the 2 combined runs.

Roberts' best finish at the FIBT World Championships was 20th in the men's event at Lake Placid in 2009.

He qualified for the 2010 Winter Olympics, but withdrew prior to the third run of the men's event due to a head injury from when he crashed at 146.7 km/h at the final curve in training. He was cleared to race on day 1, however due to concussion he was unable to compete on day 2 for the 3rd and 4th runs of the event.
