= Jora Singh =

Indian decathlete

Personal information
- Full name: Jora Singh
- Nationality: Indian
- Born: 1 January 1979 (age 47) Haryana, India

Sport
- Country: India
- Sport: Track and field
- Event: Decathlon
- Team: Border Security Force

Achievements and titles
- Personal bests: outdoor: 7,502 pts (2 March 2006, former Indian record)
- Updated on 20 June 2011

Jora Singh (born 1 January 1979) is an Indian track and field athlete from Haryana who specializes in the decathlon. Jora held the Indian National record of 7502 points set during the Federation Cup held in New Delhi on 2 March 2006 before being broken by Bharatinder Singh in 2011. He broke Kulwinder Singh's previous mark of 7325 points, registered in Chennai in August 2005.

== Personal bests ==
Category	Performance	Place	Date
100 m	11.29 s	Amman	27 July 2007
Long jump	6.44 m	Incheon	3 September 2005
Shot put	13.57 m	Incheon	3 September 2005
High jump	1.83 m	Amman	27 July 2007
400 m	50.40 s	Incheon	3 September 2005
110 m hurdles	15.53 s	Amman	28 September 2007
Discus throw	46.34 m	Incheon	4 September 2005
Pole vault	4.70 m	Amman	28 September 2007
Javelin throw	56.01 m	Incheon	4 September 2005
1500 m	4:47.71	Incheon	4 October 2005
Decathlon	7502	New Delhi	2 March 2006

Jora Singh, Deputy Commandant (DC), is an officer of Border Security Force. As a coach, he is now training athletes for national and international competitions. His contribution to the nation is priceless.
