= Carla Pavan =

Canadian skeleton racer

Carla Pavan (born April 5, 1975) is a Canadian skeleton racer who has competed since 2002. Her lone Skeleton World Cup victory was at Igls in December 2005.

Pavan's best finish at the FIBT World Championships was fifth in the women's event at St. Moritz in 2007.
