= Melissa Hoar =

Australian skeleton racer

Melissa Hoar (born 26 January 1983 in Dalmeny, New South Wales) is an Australian skeleton racer who has competed since 2004. Her best Skeleton World Cup finish was fifth at Nagano in January 2006.

Hoar's best finish at the FIBT World Championships was 12th in the women's event at Altenberg in 2008.

Hoar won the Junior (under 23) World Championships in Igls, Austria in 2006.

She competed at the 2010 Winter Olympics, finishing twelfth. She is also a member of the Australian Olympic team in Sochi, Russia in the 2014 Olympic Winter Games.

Hoar graduated from the University of Wollongong with a Bachelor of PD/H/PE degree; she earned her post graduate Doctor of Chiropractic from Palmer College of Chiropractic in San Jose, California.
