= Anže Šetina =

Slovenian skeleton racer (born 1986)

Anže Šetina (born May 9, 1986 in Kranj) is a Slovenian skeleton racer who has competed since 2006. His best World Cup finish was 15th in Igls in January 2010.

Šetina competed at the 2010 Winter Olympics where he finished 21st.
