= Courtney Yamada-Anderson =

American skeleton racer (born 1980)

Courtney Yamada (born April 6, 1980) is an American skeleton racer who has competed since 2002. Her best Skeleton World Cup finish was third at Nagano in January 2007.

A native of Boise, Idaho, Yamada's best finish at the FIBT World Championships was 13th in the women's event at St. Moritz in 2007.
