= Shinsuke Tayama =

Japanese skeleton racer (born 1982)

Shinsuke Tayama (田山 真輔, Tayama Shinsuke) (born October 18, 1982) is a Japanese skeleton racer who has competed since 2001. His best World Cup finish was 15th at Park City, Utah in 2009.

Tayama was disqualified at the FIBT World Championships 2009 in the men's skeleton event.

He qualified for the 2010 Winter Olympics where he finished 19th.
