= Masaru Inada =

Japanese skeleton racer (born 1978)

Masaru Inada (稲田 勝; born November 2, 1978 in Sapporo, Hokkaido) is a Japanese skeleton racer who has competed since 1997. He finished 18th in the men's skeleton event at both the 2002 and 2006 Winter Olympics. Inada's best finish at the FIBT World Championships was 11th in Nagano in 2003.

He is a graduate of Sendai University.
