= Daniel Maechler =

Swiss skeleton racer

Daniel Maechler (born 28 November 1974) is a Swiss skeleton racer who has competed since 2003. His best Skeleton World Cup finish was second at Igls in January 2007.

Maechler's best finish at the FIBT World Championships was eighth in the men's event at St. Moritz in 2007.
