= Patrick Shannon (skeleton racer) =

Irish skeleton racer

Patrick Shannon (born April 10, 1977, in Wexford) is an Irish skeleton racer who has competed since 2003. His best World Cup finish was 23rd at Königssee in 2009. Shannon finished 25th in the men's event at the FIBT World Championships 2008 in Altenberg, Germany. He qualified for the 2010 Winter Olympics in Vancouver where he finished 25th overall. Pat is also a former winner of the triple jump and has competed for Ireland on numerous occasions. Pat is currently doing his summer training with Menapians A.C in Wexford where he is also a coach.
