= Nicola Drocco =

Italian skeleton racer (born 1979)

Nicola Drocco (born 6 February 1979 in Turin) is an Italian skeleton racer who has competed since 2003. He qualified for the 2010 Winter Olympics where he finished 26th.

Drocco's best career finish was seventh at Cesana Pariol in 2007.
