= Olga Korobkina =

Russian skeleton racer (born 1989)

Olga Korobkina (born May 28, 1989) is a Russian skeleton racer who has competed since 2004. Her best Skeleton World Cup finish was ninth at Cesana Pariol in January 2008.

Korobkina's best finish at the FIBT World Championships was 17th in the women's event at Altenberg in 2008.
