= Costanza Zanoletti =

Italian skeleton racer

Costanza Zanoletti (born 2 December 1980 in Novara) is an Italian skeleton racer who has competed since 2002. She finished fifth in the women's skeleton event at the 2006 Winter Olympics in Turin.

Zanoletti's best finish at the FIBT World Championships was 15th in the women's skeleton event at Nagano in 2003.

She competed at the 2010 Winter Olympics where she finished 15th.
