= Anthony Sawyer =

British skeleton racer

Anthony Sawyer (born 29 April 1980 in Bristol, England) is a British skeleton racer. He competed in Decathlon for England at the 2002 Commonwealth Games in Manchester. The same year he began competing in skeleton.

Sawyer was also a Royal Marine Commando Reserve from 2000 until 2006.

== Significant results ==
His best Skeleton World Cup finish was second at Cesana Pariol in January 2008.

3rd - World Cup Park City - 2007

4th - World Cup Nagano -2007

Sawyer's best finish at the FIBT World Championships was 15th in the men's event at St. Moritz in 2007.

He was ranked 6th overall at the 2007–08 Skeleton World Cup
