= Katie Uhlaender =

American skeleton racer

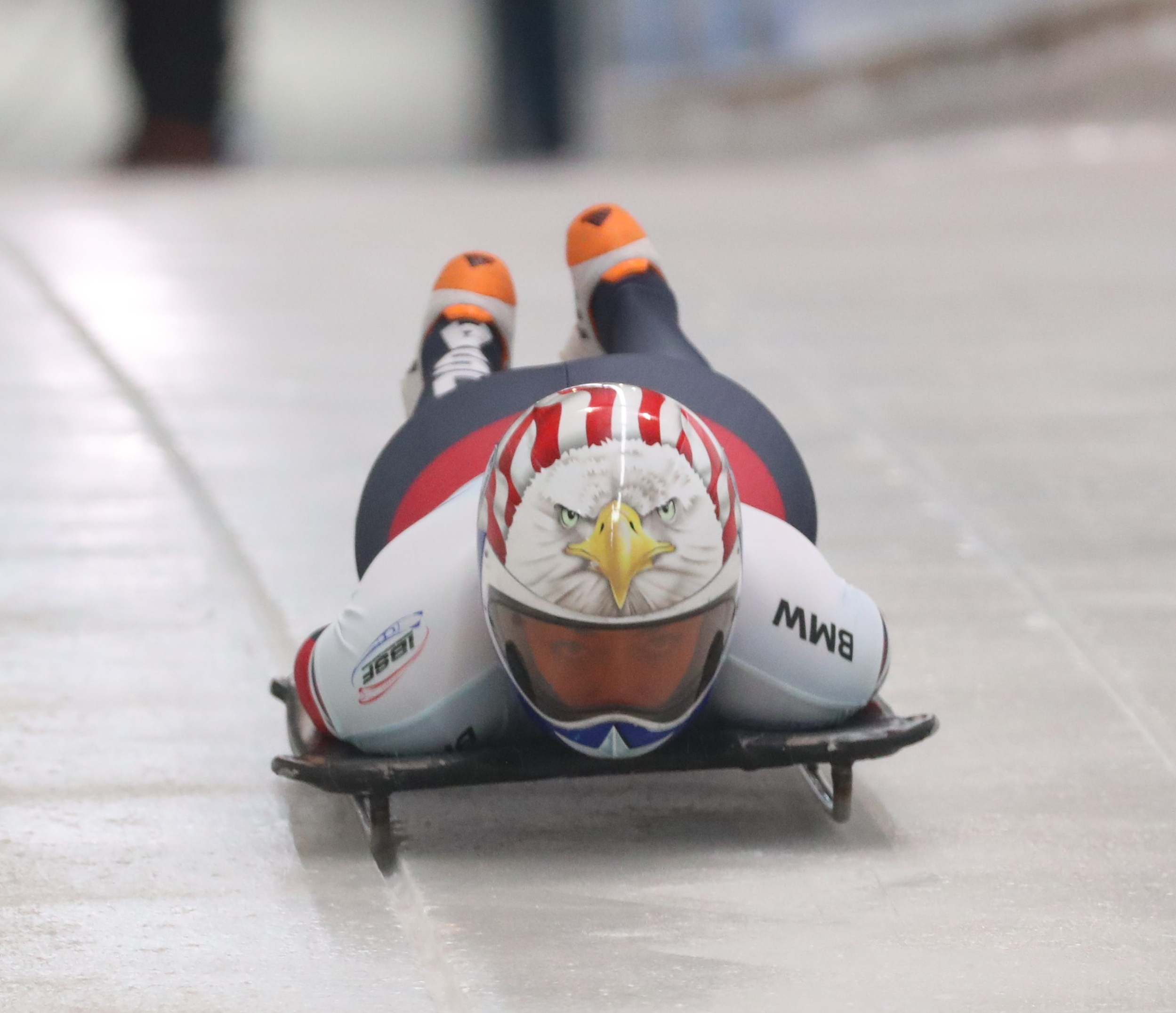
- Katie Uhlaender in 2021

Personal information
- Full name: Kathryn Uhlaender
- Born: July 17, 1984 (age 42) Vail, Colorado, U.S.
- Home town: Breckenridge, Colorado, U.S.
- Height: 5 ft 4 in (163 cm)
- Weight: 145 lb (66 kg)

Sport
- Country: United States
- Sport: Skeleton

Achievements and titles
- Olympic finals: 6th (Torino 2006); 11th (Vancouver 2010); 4th (Sochi 2014); 13th (Pyeongchang 2018); 6th (Beijing 2022)
Medal record
Women's skeleton
Representing the United States
World Championships
Gold medal – first place	2012 Lake Placid	Women
Gold medal – first place	2012 Lake Placid	Mixed team
Silver medal – second place	2008 Altenberg	Women
Bronze medal – third place	2007 St. Moritz	Women
Bronze medal – third place	2008 Altenberg	Mixed team
Bronze medal – third place	2009 Lake Placid	Mixed team

Kathryn "Katie" Uhlaender (born July 17, 1984) is an American skeleton racer who has competed since 2003. She has won six medals at the FIBT World Championships with two gold (women's skeleton: FIBT World Championships 2012, mixed bobsleigh-skeleton team event: 2012), one silver (women's skeleton: 2008), and three bronze (women's skeleton: 2007, mixed bobsleigh-skeleton team event: 2008, 2009).

== Career ==
Uhlaender won the women's Skeleton World Cup title twice (2006-7, 2007-8), and has won 27 career World Cup medals, including 11 gold medals. She finished sixth in the women's skeleton event at the 2006 Winter Olympics in Turin and the 2022 Winter Olympics in Beijing; with a controversial 4th place finish in the 2014 Olympics in Sochi. Following an April 2009 snowmobile accident in which she shattered her kneecap, six weeks after the death of her father, Uhlaender qualified for the 2010 Winter Olympics in Vancouver, where she finished 11th. On January 18, 2014, Uhlaender was named to the 2014 U.S. Olympic skeleton team. She placed fourth at the 2014 Olympics, missing out on a medal by .04 seconds.

Uhlaender also competed in 2012 Olympic trials for weightlifting and won the 2018 National Championship for the team sprint in track cycling during breaks from skeleton competition.

Uhlaender was named to the U.S. in women's skeleton team at the 2018 Winter Olympics in Pyeongchang.

In July 2018, Uhlaender testified before the U.S. Helsinki Commission in Washington, DC, on the subject of doping in sports. She was on a panel alongside Travis Tygart, CEO of the U.S. Anti-Doping Administration, Jim Walden, the attorney for Russian whistleblower Dr. Grigory Rodchenkov, and Yuliya Stepanova, a former Russian track star turned whistleblower. Uhlaender told the body that she felt she was twice unfairly denied an Olympic medal. The loss "erased the meaning of sport and the Olympics as I knew it."

In January 2026, Uhlaender won an IBSF North American Cup race in Lake Placid during Olympic qualification. Two days before the race, four Canadian athletes — 80% of the Canadian team — were withdrawn, reducing the field size and lowering the points available for Olympic qualification. Uhlaender and five other nations challenged the withdrawals before the IBSF Appeals Tribunal, arguing that the actions unfairly impacted Olympic qualification standings. The Tribunal found that the withdrawals were “intentional and directed to reducing the points available to athletes.” This conduct violated the Olympic Movement Code on the Prevention of the Manipulation of Competitions, but the Tribunal concluded that it lacked authority to alter the race results or ranking points. Uhlaender and the five other nations later appealed to the Court of Arbitration for Sport (CAS), Ad Hoc Division, which dismissed the appeal for lack of jurisdiction because it fell outside the applicable Olympic filing window.

Uhlaender appeared in the HBO documentary The Weight of Gold (2020), which examined mental health challenges faced by Olympic athletes."The Weight of Gold". HBO.

== Personal life ==
A native of Vail, Colorado, Uhlaender is the daughter of Major League Baseball outfielder (and former Cleveland Indians coach) Ted Uhlaender. In memory of her father, she wears his National League Championship ring from the 1972 Cincinnati Reds on a necklace. She is attending the Columbia University School of General Studies, where she is studying psychology.
