= Eric Bernotas =

American skeleton racer (born 1971)

Personal information
- Born: August 5, 1971 (age 55) West Chester, Pennsylvania, United States
Medal record
Skeleton
Representing United States
World Championships
Silver medal – second place	2007 St. Moritz	Men
Silver medal – second place	2007 St. Moritz	Mixed team
Bronze medal – third place	2009 Lake Placid	Mixed team

Eric Bernotas (born August 5, 1971) is an American former skeleton racer who has competed since 2002. He won three medals at the FIBT World Championships with two silvers (Men's skeleton: 2007, Mixed team: 2007) and a bronze (Mixed team: 2009).

== Early life and education ==
Bernotas is from West Chester, Pennsylvania. He was educated at Malvern Preparatory School and West Virginia University, where he was a member of Phi Kappa Psi and graduated in 1994.

== Athletic career ==
Bernotas discovered the sport by accident in 2001, after he got lost and ended up at the Lake Placid sledding track whilst driving through the Adirondacks.

Bernotas competed in two Winter Olympics, earning his best finish of sixth in the men's skeleton event at Turin in 2006.

His best overall seasonal Skeleton World Cup finish was second in the men's event in 2006-7. Bernotas earned a medical waiver to compete in the 2009-10 Skeleton World Cup season following a leg injury suffered during training. He took a total of twelve medals in his World Cup career. In addition he won four US national titles in skeleton.

In March 2011 the United States Bobsled and Skeleton Federation announced that Bernotas had retired from the sport after a ten-year career. After retiring from competition he became a coach, serving as head coach of the Australian skeleton team from July 2011 to July 2014, when he became the coach of the British World Cup skeleton team.

== Personal life ==
In February 2006, he appeared on The 700 Club where he talked about being a Christian and how his faith plays into his sports career. He said, "God presented this opportunity to me," Eric says. "I believe we all have desires and dreams about things we would like to do. I think wonderful things can be done with pursuing our dreams if we allow the Spirit to work within us. When we take the proper steps and do our best to make the right decisions, there’s a purpose behind what we’re doing. Our dreams are just one awesome way to do what we love and at the same time do God’s work."

== Other sources ==
- 2006 men's skeleton results
- "USA Names 2009-2010 World Cup Teams". International Bobsleigh & Skeleton Federation. 26 October 2009. Accessed 27 October 2009.
- List of men's skeleton World Cup champions since 1987.
- Men's skeleton world championship medalists since 1989.
- NBCOlympics.com 16 January 2010 on the bobsleigh and skeleton slots for the US Team for the 2010 Winter Olympics. - accessed 17 January 2010.
- Mixed bobsleigh-skeleton world championship medalists since 2007
