= Caleb Smith (skeleton racer) =

American skeleton racer (born 1983)

Caleb Smith (born October 5, 1983) is an American skeleton racer who has competed since 2001. His best Skeleton World Cup finish was second at Lake Placid in December 2006.

Smith's best finish at the FIBT World Championships was 12th in the men's event at St. Moritz in 2007. Smith captured the 2007 US national championship alongside silver and bronze medals in the 2004 and 2005 junior world championships.
