= Yeorgios Andreou =

Cypriot decathlete (born 1974)

Personal information
- Nationality: Cypriot
- Born: 26 July 1974 (age 52)

Sport
- Sport: Athletics
- Event: Decathlon

Yeorgios Andreou (Greek: Γεώργιος Ανδρέου; born 26 July 1974) is a Greek Cypriot athlete. He competed in the men's decathlon at the 2000 Summer Olympics.
