= Michelle Steele =

Australian skeleton racer (born 1986)

Personal information
- Born: 8 March 1986 (age 40) Gladstone, Queensland, Australia
- Height: 164 cm (5 ft 5 in) (2014)
- Weight: 55 kg (121 lb) (2014)

Sport
- Country: Australia
- Sport: Skeleton
- Event: Individual Women
- Updated on 6 February 2014

Michelle Steele (born 8 March 1986) is an Australian skeleton racer who has competed since 2004. She finished 13th in the women's skeleton event at the 2006 Winter Olympics in Turin.

Steele's best finish at the FIBT World Championships was sixth in the women's skeleton event at St. Moritz in 2007. Her best finish in the World Cup was 3rd at Calgary in 2013.

She used to be a surf lifesaving athlete, and a level nine gymnast. Steele's surf lifesaving highlights including coming fourth in the open women's beach flags at the Australian Surf Lifesaving Championships in 2004, and being Queensland State Champion in open and under 19 beach flag events.
