= Desiree Bjerke =

Norwegian skeleton racer (born 1971)

Desiree Bjerke Andersen (born 22 March 1971 in Fredrikstad) is a Norwegian skeleton racer who has competed since 1997. She finished ninth in the women's skeleton event at the 2006 Winter Olympics in Turin.

Bjerke's best finish at the FIBT World Championships was 17th twice in the women's skeleton event (2005, 2007).

She competed at the 2010 Winter Olympics where she finished 17th.
