= Markus Penz =

Austrian skeleton racer

Markus Penz (born 6 June 1975, in Innsbruck) is an Austrian skeleton racer who has competed since 2002. He finished 16th in the men's skeleton event at the 2006 Winter Olympics in Turin.

Penz also finished fourth in the men's skeleton event at the 2007 FIBT World Championships in St. Moritz.
