= Zach Lund =

American skeleton racer (born 1979)

Personal information
- Born: March 22, 1979 (age 47)
Medal record
Skeleton
Representing United States
World Championships
Bronze medal – third place	2007 St. Moritz	Men
Bronze medal – third place	2008 Altenberg	Mixed team

Zach Lund | Former Olympian, Author, Speaker, and Coach. Pictured is Zach in his later years as a coach and speaker.

American Olympian, former skeleton racer, author, speaker, and coach

Zach Lund (born March 22, 1979) is an American former skeleton racer who represented the United States at the 2010 Winter Olympics in Vancouver, Canada. He won the overall men's Skeleton World Cup title during the 2006–07 season and earned two bronze medals at the FIBT World Championships.

Following his competitive athletic career, Lund transitioned into coaching, motivational speaking, and personal development. He developed The Olympian Mindset, a framework drawing on his experience in elite athletics to address resilience, leadership, personal growth, and purposeful living. He is also the author of the book, The Olympian Mindset.

== Early Life and Education ==
Lund was born and raised in Salt Lake City, Utah. He attended Judge Memorial Catholic High School, graduating in 1998, and later studied at Westminster College in Salt Lake City.

Lund initially pursued luge before transitioning to skeleton in 1999. The change marked the beginning of his international racing career.

== Athletic Career ==
=== Early career and World Cup competition ===
Lund began competing in skeleton internationally in the early 2000s. He won America's Cup titles in 2002 and 2004 and established himself as a leading American competitor on the international circuit.

During the 2004–05 season, Lund consistently finished among the top ten competitors in World Cup events.

His competitive breakthrough came during the 2006–07 season, when he won the overall men's Skeleton World Cup championship. His victories that season included races in Park City, Lake Placid, Cesana, and Königssee.

Lund also earned two medals at the FIBT World Championships:

- 2007, St. Moritz, Switzerland: Bronze medal, men's skeleton.
- 2008, Altenberg, Germany: Bronze medal, mixed bobsleigh-skeleton team event.

=== 2006 Olympic disqualification ===
Lund was prevented from competing in the 2006 Winter Olympics in Turin after testing positive for finasteride, a prescription medication used to treat hair loss.

At the time, finasteride was included on the World Anti-Doping Agency's prohibited substances list because of its potential use as a masking agent.

Lund maintained that he had been taking the medication for several years and had disclosed its use during previous drug tests.

The Court of Arbitration for Sport upheld the suspension while acknowledging that Lund had not intended to cheat.

Finasteride was subsequently removed from the prohibited substances list in 2009.

Lund returned to international competition following his suspension and won the overall World Cup championship during the 2006–07 season.

=== 2010 Winter Olympics ===
Lund qualified for the United States Olympic team at the 2010 Winter Olympics in Vancouver, competing in the men's skeleton event at the Whistler Sliding Centre.

He finished fifth overall with a combined time of 3:31.27 across four runs, placing 0.52 seconds behind bronze medalist Aleksandr Tretyakov of Russia.

The Vancouver Games marked Lund's only Olympic appearance as a competitor.

== Post-competitive career ==
Following the 2010 Winter Olympics, Lund stepped away from international skeleton competition and pursued coaching and other professional activities.

He subsequently became involved in motivational speaking and personal development, drawing on experiences from his athletic career, including competitive success, setbacks, and the psychological demands of elite sport.

His speaking and coaching work focuses on themes such as resilience, self-belief, leadership, adaptability, and finding fulfillment beyond external achievement.

== The Olympian Mindset ==
Lund developed The Olympian Mindset, a personal development framework based on principles derived from his experience in competitive skeleton racing.

The program emphasizes applying lessons from Olympic-level athletic preparation to professional and personal challenges. Its five principles address courage, focus, intentional action, adaptability, and appreciation of the process.

The framework includes the following principles:

1. Go Headfirst into Life: Taking action despite uncertainty or fear.
2. You Go Where You're Looking: Maintaining focus and directing attention toward desired outcomes.
3. Embody Your Dream: Aligning everyday actions with personal goals and aspirations.
4. Accelerate Through the Curves: Responding to challenges through adaptability and perseverance.
5. Enjoy the Journey: Finding meaning and fulfillment throughout the pursuit of goals.

Lund has presented these concepts through speaking engagements, coaching, and podcast interviews.

In March 2025, he appeared on Monday Morning Mojo with Anna Gibbs, discussing mental resilience, discipline, and the application of elite athletic experience to business and personal development.

In October 2026, an article by Loredana Ghete described Lund's presentation of the five principles of The Olympian Mindset and their application to professional leadership and personal growth.

== Selected sporting achievements ==
Year	Competition	Result
2002	America's Cup	Overall title
2004	America's Cup	Overall title
2006–07	Skeleton World Cup	Overall champion
2007	FIBT World Championships, men's skeleton	Bronze medal
2008	FIBT World Championships, mixed team	Bronze medal
2010	Vancouver Winter Olympics, men's skeleton	5th place

== See also ==
- List of sportspeople sanctioned for doping offences
