= Adam Pengilly =

British skeleton racer (born 1977)

Personal information
- Full name: Adam Laird Pengilly
- Born: 14 October 1977 (age 48) Taunton, Somerset, England
Medal record
Men's skeleton
Representing Great Britain
World Championships
Silver medal – second place	2009 Lake Placid	Men

Adam Laird Pengilly (born 14 October 1977) is a British skeleton racer who has competed since 2004. He won a silver medal in men's skeleton event at the FIBT World Championships 2009 in Lake Placid.

Pengilly finished eighth in the men's skeleton event at the 2006 Winter Olympics. During those games, he kept a diary of what transpired around him.

Pengilly qualified for the 2010 Winter Olympics where he finished 18th. On 25 February 2010, he was elected by his fellow Olympic athletes to the International Olympic Committee Athletes' Commission along with Chinese speed skater Yang Yang and American ice hockey player Angela Ruggiero.

Adam served as a member of the IOC at London 2012, Sochi 2014, Rio 2016 and Pyeongchang 2018. Following an altercation with a security guard Pengilly was sent home from the Pyeongchang Winter Olympics.

== Education ==
Pengilly was educated at Heathfield Community School in West Monkton near Taunton in Somerset, followed by Richard Huish College in Taunton.

== Personal life ==
Pengilly is a Christian and is part of Widcombe Baptist Church, Bath, UK. He comes from Creech St Michael in Somerset, where he grew up, often visiting his parents who still live there and the Creech St Michael Baptist Church. He graduated in Sport and Exercise Science from Birmingham University in 2000. Adam now lives and trains in Bath.

He married Ruth on 10 July 2010.
