= Team Bath =

Sports club

- Full name: University of Bath – Team Bath
- Founded: 1971
- Based in: University of Bath; Claverton Down; Bath, Somerset
- Colours: Blue and gold
- Website: www.teambath.com

Team Bath is the University of Bath's sporting organisation. In addition to entering teams in BUCS intervarsity competitions, Team Bath has also entered teams in national leagues and competitions. Team Bath F.C. reached the first round proper of the 2002–03 FA Cup. They become the first university team to reach this stage since Oxford University A.F.C. in 1880. In 2005–06 the netball team were both founder members and the inaugural champions of the Netball Superleague. They were Superleague champions again in 2006–07, 2008–09, 2009–10 and 2013. The field hockey club enter a team in the Men's England Hockey League.

Team Bath's main sports complex is the Sports Training Village based at the University of Bath campus at Claverton Down. The university has hosted several sporting events, including the 1995 European Youth Summer Olympic Days, the 2019 Fed Cup Europe/Africa Zone competition and the 2023 UIPM Laser-Run and Pentathlon World Championships. The facilities at the University of Bath have also been used as a training base by many individual Olympians and Paralympians.

== History ==
Year	Key events
1968	University of Bath student, David Hembrow, swims for Great Britain at the 1968 Summer Olympics. He becomes the University's first Olympian.
1971	Construction on the new sports facilities begins at Claverton Down; Tom Hudson is appointed as the University's first Director of Physical Education. He remains in the role for the next twenty years.
1972	Former Wales football international, Ivor Powell, joins the University of Bath as a football coach. He goes on to serve in the role for thirty eight years.
1974	Denis Howell MP officially opens the new sports facilities.
1976	University of Bath becomes the first university in the United Kingdom to offer a sports scholarship. Martyn Hedges becomes the first recipient.
1987	The England national rugby union team begin to train at the University of Bath.
1990	James May, a University of Bath sports scholar wins, representing England at the 1990 Commonwealth Games wins a gymnastics vault gold medal.
1994	Sir Roger Bannister officially opens the athletics track.
1995	University of Bath hosts the 1995 European Youth Summer Olympic Days
1997	Phase I of the Sports Training Village is completed. A 50m swimming pool and four indoor tennis courts are added to the athletics track, eight outdoor tennis courts and field hockey pitch.
1999	Colin Jackson, coached by Malcolm Arnold, wins the 110 metres hurdles at the 1999 World Championships in Athletics
2000	Stephanie Cook becomes the first University of Bath-based athlete to win an Olympic Gold medal when she wins the Modern pentathlon at the 2000 Summer Olympics; Sascha Kindred and Matt Walker also win gold medals in the swimming at the 2000 Summer Paralympics.
2001	Lord Glentoran officially opens the bobsleigh and skeleton track.
2003	Team Bath F.C. reach the first round proper of the 2002–03 FA Cup. They become the first university team to reach this stage since Oxford University A.F.C. in 1880.
2003	Tim Henman officially opens a Lawn Tennis Association academy at the Sports Training Village.
2004	Anne, Princess Royal officially opens a newly expanded Sports Training Village
2004	Jason Gardener wins a gold medal for Great Britain at the 2004 Summer Olympics as part of the Men's 4 × 100 metres relay team.
2005–06	With a squad that included Pamela Cookey, Rachel Dunn, Stacey Francis, Jess Garland, Tamsin Greenway and Geva Mentor, Team Bath's netball team win the inaugural Netball Superleague title. They subsequently dominate the early seasons of the league, winning further Superleague titles in 2006–07, 2008–09, 2009–10 and 2013.
2010	Amy Williams wins a gold medal for Great Britain at the 2010 Winter Olympics in the skeleton.
2012	Thirty University of Bath-based athletes compete at the 2012 Summer Olympics and the 2012 Summer Paralympics. They included Michael Jamieson who won silver in the Men's 200 metre breaststroke and Samantha Murray who won silver in the modern pentathlon
2014	Lizzy Yarnold succeeds Amy Williams as she wins a gold medal for Great Britain at the 2014 Winter Olympics in the skeleton; Kelly Gallagher also won a gold medal for Great Britain at the 2014 Winter Paralympics in alpine skiing.
2015	The Australia national rugby union team train at the University of Bath during the 2015 Rugby World Cup.
2015	University of Bath host the 2015 European Modern Pentathlon Championships.
2016	Twenty University of Bath-based athletes compete at the 2016 Summer Olympics and the 2016 Summer Paralympics, winning twelve medals between them. They included Paul Blake who won gold in the Men's Paralympics 400 metres.
2017	Sophie Kamlish win gold at the 2017 World Para Athletics Championships in the women's 100 metres; Danny Talbot is a member of the Great Britain team that wins gold at the 2017 World Championships in Athletics in the Men's 4 × 100 metres relay.
2018	Lizzy Yarnold wins a second gold medal for Great Britain at the 2018 Winter Olympics in the skeleton. Laura Deas win a bronze in the same event. Dom Parsons win a bronze medal in the men's skeleton.
2016	Thirty University of Bath-based athletes compete at the 2018 Commonwealth Games, representing eight different countries and winning seventeen medals between them. The England national netball team that wins gold in the netball tournament features five former or current Team Bath players – Ama Agbeze, Eboni Beckford-Chambers, Kadeen Corbin, Serena Guthrie and Geva Mentor.
2018	James Cooke wins gold at the 2018 World Modern Pentathlon Championships and Vicky Holland win gold at the 2018 ITU World Triathlon Series within 48 hours of each other.
2019	University of Bath host three stages of the 2019 Fed Cup Europe/Africa Zone competition.
2019	University of Bath host the 2019 European Modern Pentathlon Championships. James Cooke wins gold at the event.

== Historic 2024 ==
The year 2024 marked a significant period of success for Team Bath athletes across various sports, particularly at the Paris 2024 Olympic and Paralympic Games.

=== Olympic and Paralympic Success ===
Team Bath athletes secured 17 medals during the Paris 2024 Games.

. Notable achievements include:

- Dimitri Coutya and Piers Gilliver in wheelchair fencing, each winning four medals (two gold, one silver, one bronze).
- Tom Dean becoming a triple Olympic champion in swimming, defending the men's 4x200m freestyle relay title.
- Dan Bethell winning a silver medal in SL3 men's singles para-badminton.
- Kate Shortman and Izzy Thorpe claiming Team GB's first-ever Olympic artistic swimming medal with silver in the Duet event.

== World Championships and European Titles ==
Team Bath athletes excelled in various international competitions:

- Kate Shortman and Izzy Thorpe won Britain's first World Championships medals in artistic swimming (silver and bronze) in February.
- Marcus Wyatt became the men's European Champion in skeleton.
- Matt Weston won silver in both the men's race and team event at the Skeleton World Championships.
- Corie Mapp secured Overall World Cup gold in para-bobsleigh.
- Freya Anderson anchored Aquatics GB to women's medley relay silver at the World Aquatics Short-Course Championships.

== Rugby Achievements ==
The University's rugby program saw significant milestones:

- Archie Griffin became the first current student to make his senior international debut for Wales in the Six Nations.
- Jenny Hesketh and Mollie Wilkinson made their Welsh debuts in the Women's Six Nations.
- Six students were selected for the U20 Six Nations across England, Scotland, and Wales teams.

== Other Achievements ==
- Team Bath athletes brought back a total of 93 senior international medals to their training base.
- The University received UK Sport-accredited Elite Training Centre status.
- A £450,000 upgrade of the Team Bath Gym was completed.
- The 50th anniversary of the Founders Hall opening was celebrated.

== Hall of Fame ==
Date of Induction	Inductees	
12 May 2014	Jason Gardener	Athletics
12 May 2014	Ben Rushgrove	Athletics
27 May 2014	Amy Williams	Skeleton
20 July 2015	Tom Hudson	Former Director of Sport
3 August 2015	Lyn Gunson	Netball
17 August 2015	Jan Bártů	Modern Pentathlon
28 January 2016	Paul Palmer	Swimming
2 February 2016	Bobby Crutchley	Field hockey
4 March 2016	Heather Stanning	Rowing
28 March 2016	Pamela Cookey	Netball
18 May 2016	Kate Allenby	Modern Pentathlon
18 May 2016	Stephanie Cook	Modern Pentathlon
22 June 2016	Malcolm Arnold	Athletics
22 June 2016	Colin Jackson	Athletics
9 July 2016	Ivor Powell	Football
16 November 2016	Kate Howey	Judo
26 January 2017	Ged Roddy	Former Director of Sport
26 January 2017	Mark Foster	Swimming
28 April 2017	Steve Borthwick	Rugby union
3 May 2017	Sascha Kindred	Swimming
25 September 2017	Stacey Francis	Netball
24 November 2017	Paul Blake	Athletics
29 November 2018	Alison Oliver	Former Deputy Director of Sport
25 February 2019	Michael Jamieson	Swimming
16 October 2019	Stephanie Millward	Swimming
16 October 2019	Andrei Vorontsov	Swimming
21 October 2019	Nigel Redman	Rugby union
7 December 2019	Serena Guthrie	Netball
8 February 2022	David McNulty	Swimming
12 April 2024	Anna Stembridge	Netball
12 April 2024	Jess Thirlby	Netball

== Medallists ==
The following athletes have either been students at the University of Bath or have been based at the University's training facilities.

=== Summer Olympics ===
Artistic swimming

Games	Athlete	Event	Medal
2024	Kate Shortman	Duet	2nd place, silver medalist(s)

Athletics

Games	Athlete	Event	Medal
2004	Jason Gardener	Men's 4 × 100 metres relay	1st place, gold medalist(s)
2016	Eilidh Doyle/Emily Diamond	Women's 4 × 400 metres relay	3rd place, bronze medalist(s)

Judo

Games	Athlete	Event	Medal
1992	Kate Howey	Women's 66 kg	3rd place, bronze medalist(s)
2000	Kate Howey	Women's 70 kg	2nd place, silver medalist(s)

Modern Pentathlon

The University of Bath has hosted the Pentathlon GB National Training Centre since 1998.

Games	Athlete	Event	Medal
2000	Stephanie Cook	Individual	1st place, gold medalist(s)
2000	Kate Allenby	Individual	3rd place, bronze medalist(s)
2004	Georgina Harland	Individual	3rd place, bronze medalist(s)
2008	Heather Fell	Individual	2nd place, silver medalist(s)
2012	Samantha Murray	Individual	2nd place, silver medalist(s)
2021	Joe Choong	Individual	1st place, gold medalist(s)
2021	Kate French	Individual	1st place, gold medalist(s)

Rowing

The University of Bath has hosted a British Rowing Performance Development Academy (previously known as Start) since 2003.

Games	Athlete	Event	Medal
2012	Helen Glover/Heather Stanning	Women's coxless pair	1st place, gold medalist(s)
2016	Helen Glover/Heather Stanning	Women's coxless pair	1st place, gold medalist(s)
2024	Becky Wilde	Women's double scull	3rd place, bronze medalist(s)

Swimming

The University of Bath has hosted the Aquatics GB Bath Performance Centre since 2008.

Games	Athlete	Event	Medal
1996	Paul Palmer	Men's 400 metre freestyle	2nd place, silver medalist(s)
2012	Michael Jamieson	Men's 200 metre breaststroke	2nd place, silver medalist(s)
2016	Jazmin Carlin	Women's 400 metre freestyle	2nd place, silver medalist(s)
2016	Jazmin Carlin	Women's 800 metre freestyle	2nd place, silver medalist(s)
2016	Siobhan-Marie O'Connor	Women's 200 metre individual medley	2nd place, silver medalist(s)
2016	Chris Walker-Hebborn	Men's 4 × 100 metre medley relay	2nd place, silver medalist(s)
2021	Tom Dean	Men's 200 metre freestyle	1st place, gold medalist(s)
2021	Tom Dean	Men's 4 × 200 metre freestyle relay	1st place, gold medalist(s)
2021	James Guy	Men's 4 x 200 metre freestyle relay	1st place, gold medalist(s)
2021	James Guy	Mixed 4 x 100 metre medley relay	1st place, gold medalist(s)
2021	Calum Jarvis	Men's 4 x 200 metre freestyle relay	1st place, gold medalist(s)
2021	Matt Richards	Men's 4 x 200 metre freestyle relay	1st place, gold medalist(s)
2021	Freya Anderson	Mixed 4 x 100 metre medley relay	1st place, gold medalist(s)
2021	James Guy	Men's 4 x 100 metre medley relay	2nd place, silver medalist(s)
2024	Tom Dean	Men's 4 x 200 metre freestyle relay	1st place, gold medalist(s)
2024	Kieran Bird	Men's 4 x 200 metre freestyle relay	1st place, gold medalist(s)

=== Summer Paralympics ===
Athletics

Games	Athlete	Event	Medal
2008	Ben Rushgrove	Men's 100 metres T36	2nd place, silver medalist(s)
2012	Ben Rushgrove	Men's 200 metres T36	3rd place, bronze medalist(s)
2012	Paul Blake	Men's 800 metres	3rd place, bronze medalist(s)
2012	Paul Blake	Men's 400 metres	2nd place, silver medalist(s)
2012	Katrina Hart	Women's 4 × 100 metres relay	3rd place, bronze medalist(s)
2016	Paul Blake	Men's 400 metres	1st place, gold medalist(s)

Sailing

Games	Athlete	Event	Medal
2012	Alexandra Rickham	Two Person Keelboat - SKUD 18	3rd place, bronze medalist(s)

Swimming

Athlete	Games	1st place, gold medalist(s)	2nd place, silver medalist(s)	3rd place, bronze medalist(s)
Sascha Kindred	1996, 2000, 2004, 2008, 2012, 2016	7	3	3
Matt Walker	2000, 2004, 2008, 2012	3	5	4
Nyree Lewis	2000, 2004, 2008, 2012	2	5	3
Stephanie Millward	2012, 2016	2	5	3
Anthony Stephens	2004, 2008	0	1	4
Liz Johnson	2004, 2008, 2012	1	1	1

Wheelchair fencing

The University of Bath hosts the Wheelchair Fencing National Training Centre, which officially opened in December 2022.

Games	Athlete	Event	Medal
2016	Piers Gilliver	Men's épée A	2nd place, silver medalist(s)
2021	Piers Gilliver	Men's epee A	1st place, gold medalist(s)
2021	Dimitri Coutya	Men's epee B	3rd place, bronze medalist(s)
2021	Dimitri Coutya	Men's foil B	3rd place, bronze medalist(s)
2021	Dimitri Coutya, Piers Gilliver, Oliver Lam-Watson	Men's team foil	2nd place, silver medalist(s)
2021	Dimitri Coutya, Piers Gilliver, Oliver Lam-Watson	Men's team epee	3rd place, bronze medalist(s)

=== Winter Olympics ===
Skeleton

The University of Bath hosts the British Bobsleigh and Skeleton Association national training centre and has the UK's only outdoor push-start track.

Games	Athlete	Event	Medal
2002	Alex Coomber	Women's skeleton	3rd place, bronze medalist(s)
2006	Shelley Rudman	Women's skeleton	2nd place, silver medalist(s)
2010	Amy Williams	Women's skeleton	1st place, gold medalist(s)
2014	Lizzy Yarnold	Women's skeleton	1st place, gold medalist(s)
2018	Lizzy Yarnold	Women's skeleton	1st place, gold medalist(s)
2018	Laura Deas	Women's skeleton	3rd place, bronze medalist(s)
2018	Dom Parsons	Men's skeleton	3rd place, bronze medalist(s)

=== Winter Paralympics ===
Alpine skiing

Games	Athlete	Event	Medal
2014	Kelly Gallagher	Alpine skiing	1st place, gold medalist(s)

== Facilities ==
=== Sports Training Village ===
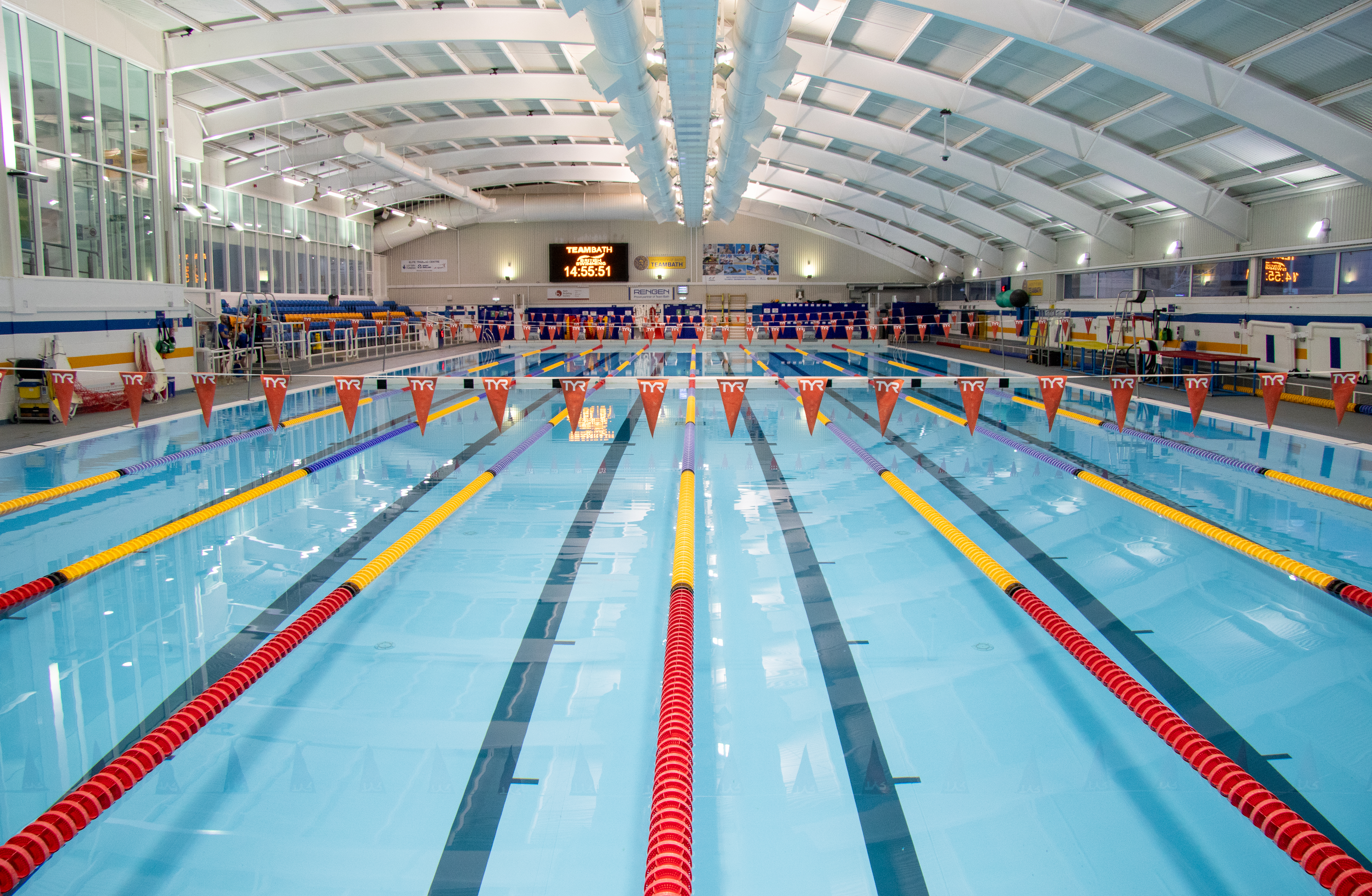
The Olympic-standard swimming pool at the Sports Training Village

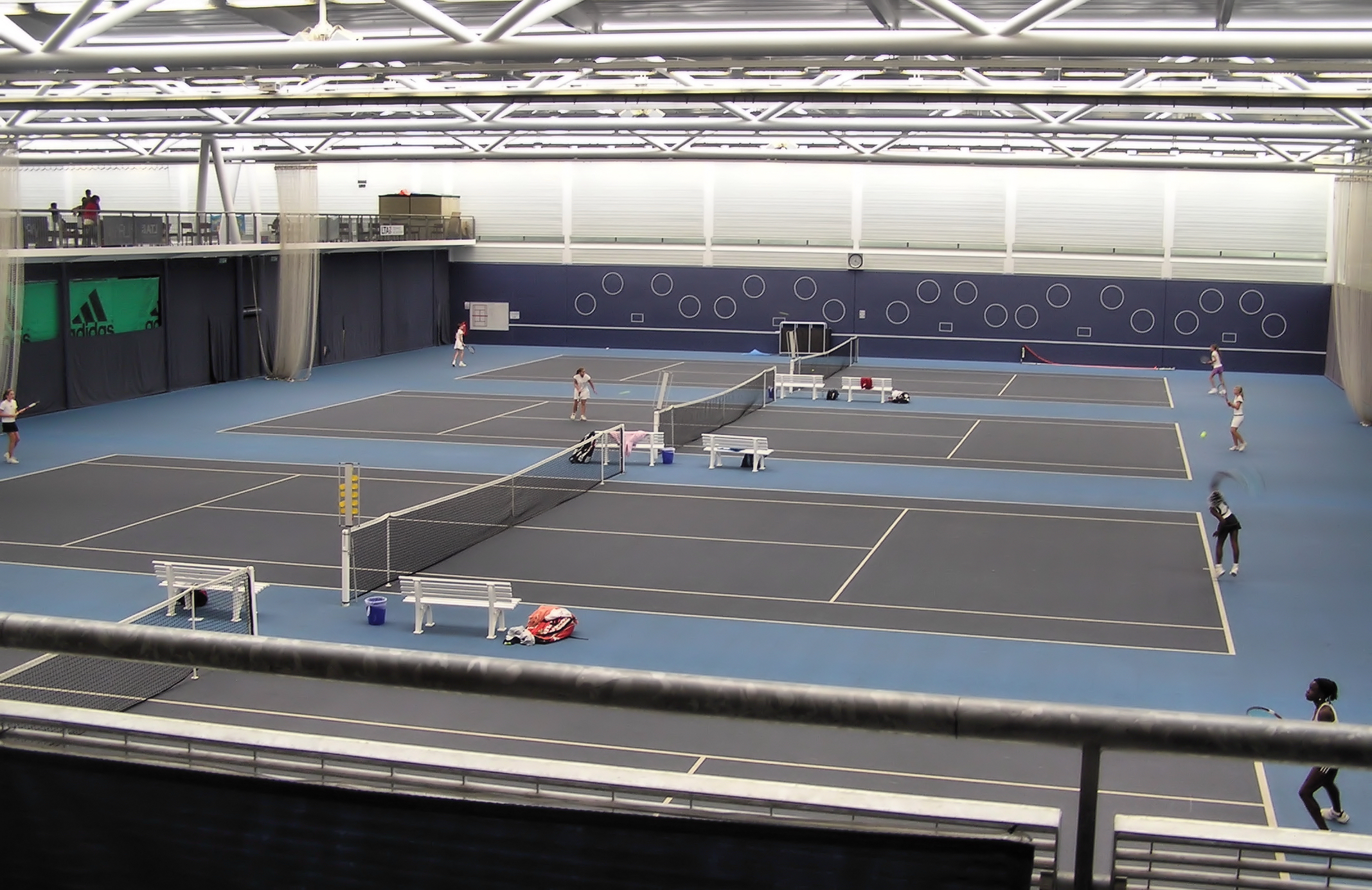
Indoor tennis courts at the Sports Training Village

Team Bath's main sports complex is the Sports Training Village based at University of Bath campus at Claverton Down. Facilities include:

- Olympic-sized London 2012 legacy pool.
- Fitness gyms
- Outdoor floodlit 400m athletics track.
- Indoor sprint track.
- Three large sprung-wood sports halls.
- Indoor and outdoor tennis courts.
- Judo dojo.
- Fencing pistes.
- Outdoor and indoor shooting ranges.
- Bobsleigh/skeleton push-start track
- Rugby and football pitches
- Outdoor field hockey pitches
- Physio treatment areas and sport science labs

== Directors of Sport ==
	Years
Tom Hudson	1971–1991
Ged Roddy	1992–2009
Stephen Baddeley	2010–
