= Lizzy Yarnold =

British former skeleton racer (born 1988)

Elizabeth Yarnold OBE
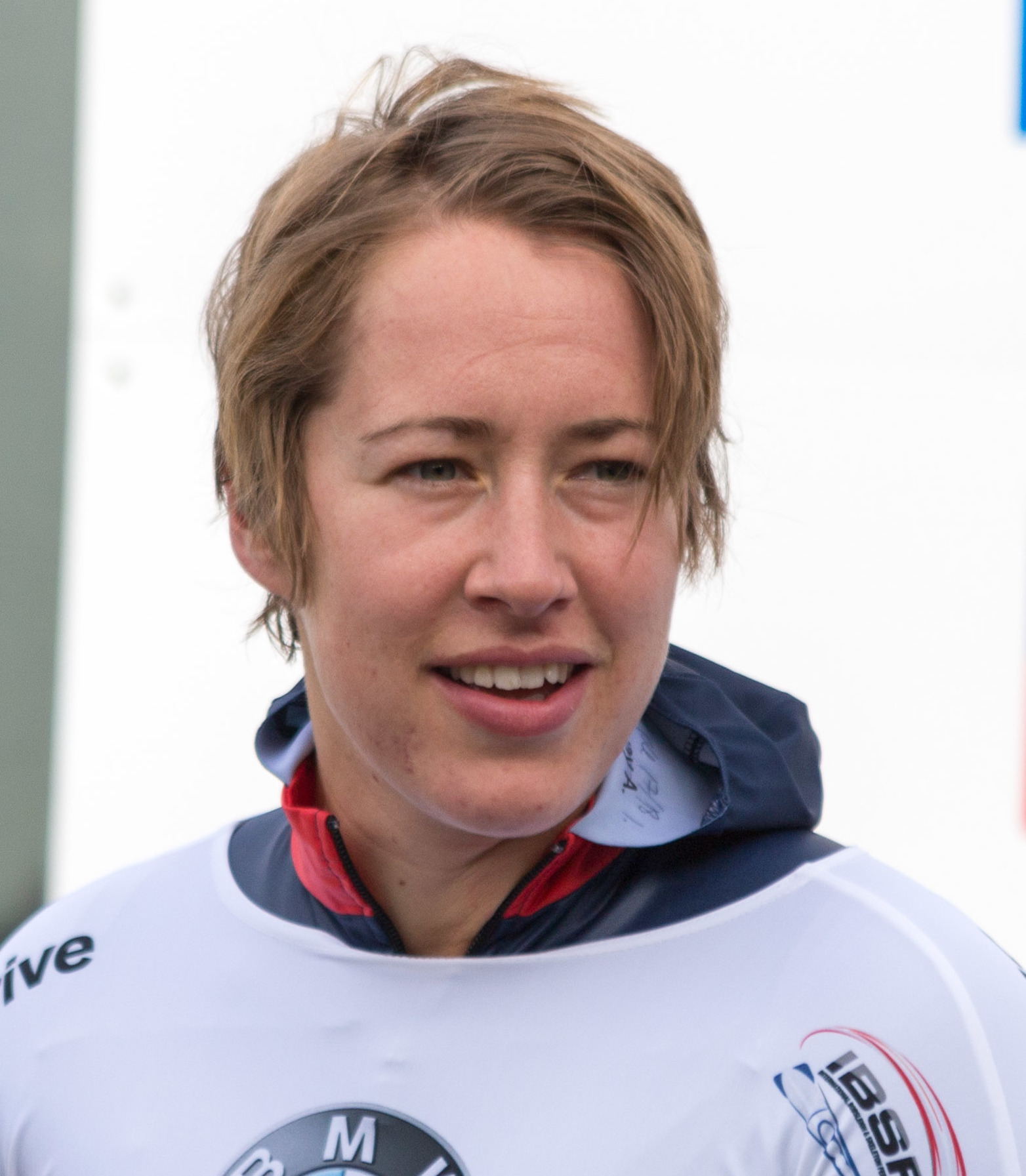
- Yarnold in 2017

Personal information
- Full name: Elizabeth Anne Yarnold
- Nicknames: She-Ra, OC
- Nationality: (United Kingdom) Great Britain
- Born: 31 October 1988 (age 38) Sevenoaks, Kent, England
- Height: 172 cm (5 ft 8 in)

Sport
- Sport: Skeleton
- Coached by: Eric Bernotas
Medal record
Olympic Games
Gold medal – first place	2014 Sochi	Women
Gold medal – first place	2018 Pyeongchang	Women
World Championships
Gold medal – first place	2015 Winterberg	Women
Bronze medal – third place	2012 Lake Placid	Women
Bronze medal – third place	2017 Königssee	Women
World Cup
Gold medal – first place	2013–2014	Women
Silver medal – second place	2014–2015	Women
European Championships
Gold medal – first place	2015 Igls	Women

Elizabeth Anne Yarnold (born 31 October 1988) is a British former skeleton racer. She won consecutive Olympic gold medals in 2014 and 2018, making her the first British Winter Olympian to win two gold medals.

Having previously competed in heptathlon during her youth, Yarnold switched to skeleton in 2008 after enrolling in UK Sport's Girls4Gold programme which identified the sport as a good fit for her. She began competing in 2010 and became world junior champion in 2012. Yarnold won the 2013–14 Skeleton World Cup, followed by a gold medal in the 2014 Winter Olympics in Sochi. The following year, she triumphed at both the World and European Championships to complete the grand slam of major titles in the sport. She became the first person to defend an Olympic title in skeleton and first British athlete to successfully defend a title in any sport at a Winter Olympics by winning at the 2018 Games in Pyeongchang, setting a new track record. Later that year, Yarnold announced her retirement from the sport. She was appointed Member of the Order of the British Empire (MBE) in the 2014 Birthday Honours and Order of the British Empire (OBE) in the 2018 Birthday Honours.

== Early life and education ==
Elizabeth Anne Yarnold was born on 31 October 1988 in Sevenoaks, Kent. She has two sisters, and grew up on a farm. She was educated at St Michael's Preparatory School in Otford, Kent, and Maidstone Grammar School for Girls. She then studied Geography, Sport and Exercise Science at the University of Gloucestershire.

During her childhood, Yarnold competed as a heptathlete, having taken inspiration from watching Denise Lewis at the 2000 Summer Olympics. In 2015, she named Lewis as her sporting idol. Yarnold reached 54th in the national shot-put rankings but did not make a career from athletics.

== Career ==
=== 2008–11: Introduction to skeleton ===
In 2008, Yarnold took part in UK Sport's Girls4Gold talent search scheme along with 1500 other young women. She was one of a hundred or so for whom skeleton was identified as an option. She had hoped to be picked for the modern pentathlon, and later said that she knew nothing about skeleton at the time. She then attended a camp at the University of Bath where ten women were invited to attend a subsequent camp in Lillehammer. Training on an ice track for the first time, she later stated that she was "petrified" of doing her second skeleton run in Lillehammer after completing her first.

In 2009, Yarnold took a summer job at an insurance firm in London where an underwriter showed an interest in her ambitions and offered to help financially support her. She later named her sled Mervyn after him. She then began training in Bath alongside Amy Williams who won a gold medal in the skeleton at the 2010 Winter Olympics. After beginning to compete in October 2010, she claimed two victories the following month in the second-tier Europa Cup. The following year, she finished runner-up at the World Junior Championships.

=== 2011–2012 and 2012–13 seasons ===
In January 2012, Yarnold claimed victory at the World Cup event in St. Moritz in her second appearance in a World Cup event. She followed this up by winning both the final leg of the 2011–12 series in Calgary and the 2012 World Junior Championships in Innsbruck. Yarnold was still working full-time for an insurance company in the off-season and revealed that she needed a good performance at the forthcoming senior World Championships to achieve extra funding. At the senior World Championships, she finished third to earn the bronze medal.

In the 2012–13 World Cup meeting in Park City, she won the silver medal, before securing a bronze medal at a subsequent event in the competition at Whistler. At the 2013 World Championships, she finished in fourth position, and she concluded the season at ninth position in the world rankings.

=== 2013–14 season: Olympic champion ===
Yarnold won the opening race of the 2013–14 World Cup in Calgary. She had initially finished second but was promoted to first by the International Bobsleigh and Skeleton Federation following a post-race inspection which disqualified American Noelle Pikus-Pace for having a prohibited piece of tape on her sled. She then won silver and bronze medals respectively at subsequent legs of the competition in Park City and Lake Placid, which were both won by Pikus-Pace. Yarnold won a second meeting held in Lake Placid, before securing another victory in Winterberg. She also finished on the podium at St. Moritz after finishing runner-up to Pikus-Pace. Yarnold was victorious at the next event in Igls, before securing overall World Cup victory at the last race of the season with a ninth-place finish in Königssee. It was the first time in eight World Cup events that she missed out on a top-three finish but she finished the series 152 points clear of second-placed Pikus-Pace.

At the 2014 Winter Olympics in Sochi, Yarnold won the gold medal after finishing 0.97 seconds clear of second-placed Pikus-Pace. She set the fastest time on each of the four runs and set new track records on her first and third runs. Yarnold's gold was the tenth gold medal achieved by a British athlete in the history of the Winter Olympics. Her victory also meant that Great Britain retained the women's skeleton title following Amy Williams' success in 2010. Yarnold declared: "My fourth run I was totally relaxed and enjoyed it. It was a bit of a messy one but I'm just so thrilled I got myself here after five years hard work." Her teammates gave her the new nickname, OC — Olympic Champion. Yarnold was then chosen to be flag bearer for Great Britain at the Games' closing ceremony. At the end of the year, she was nominated for the BBC Sports Personality of the Year Award.

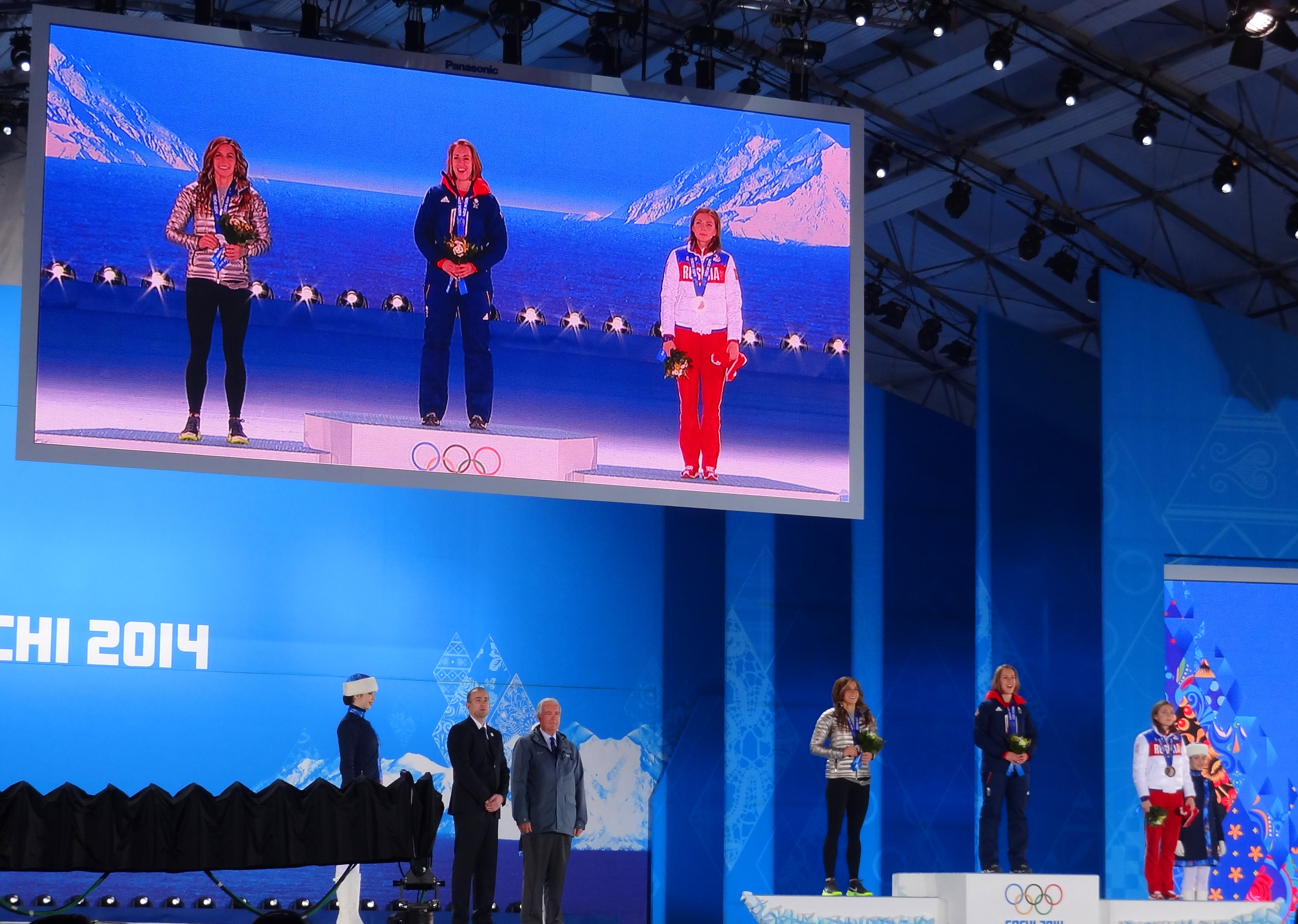
Yarnold (top step of podium) wearing her gold medal at the medal ceremony for the women's skeleton at the 2014 Winter Olympics

=== 2014–15 season: World and European Championship victories ===
In December, Yarnold won a gold medal at the season-opening World Cup meeting in Lake Placid; her first competitive appearance since becoming Olympic champion. She withdrew from the next World Cup event in Calgary after experiencing dizziness, but returned the following month, to secure a silver medal in Altenberg. She then claimed victory at Königssee to move into fifth position in the overall World Cup standings. Yarnold achieved her third and fourth victories of the World Cup season at the meetings in Igls and Sochi; the victory at Sochi was achieved on the same track that she had won her Olympic gold on a year earlier. She finished the World Cup in second position overall, losing out to Austria's Janine Flock in the standings by 20 points.

Following her gold medal in the 2014 Winter Olympics and 2013–14 World Cup success, Yarnold completed a career grand slam in the 2014–15 season with victories in both the European and World Championships. Competing at Igls, she became the European champion for the first time in February 2015. She finished 0.3 seconds ahead of second-placed Flock, with her success coming one day after her World Cup win on the same track. After the race, Yarnold said: "Being European champion was a huge goal of mine." The following month, she won her first World Championship, breaking the track record at Winterberg twice in the course of her victory. She won the event by a margin of 0.67 seconds from Germany's Jacqueline Lölling, and afterwards, Yarnold stated: "It's all I ever wanted."

In September 2015, Yarnold announced that she would take a year-long break and miss the 2015-16 skeleton season due to burnout. Describing herself as emotionally fatigued, she explained that it was "the right time to refresh, take stock and come back even more motivated for the future."

=== 2016–17 season: Return to the sport ===
After missing a year of competition, Yarnold finished fourth at the 2016–17 World Cup event at Whistler in December 2016. Two weeks later, she won a silver medal in the meeting at Lake Placid; these two results positioned her at the top of the season's overall World Cup standings. This was her only podium finish during the World Cup series, and she finished the competition in ninth position overall. In the World Championships held at Königssee in February 2017, Yarnold won the bronze medal. Reflecting on the result, she stated: "This is where I want and need to be - and is a major stepping stone."

=== 2017–18 season: Second Olympic title ===
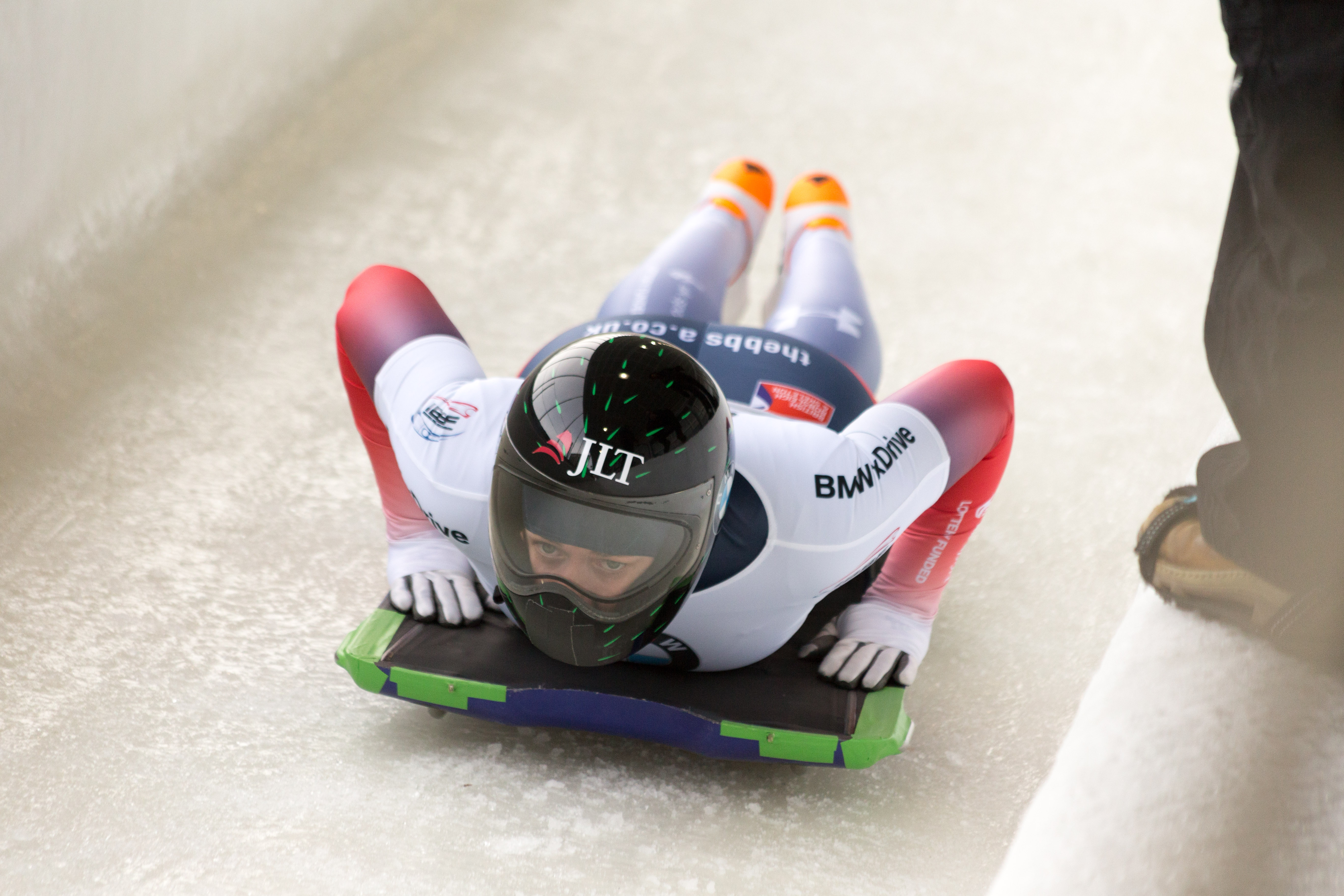
Yarnold in action at the 2017-18 World Cup meeting in Lake Placid

Having suffered from dizzy spells for several years, in September 2017, Yarnold disclosed that she had been diagnosed with a vestibular disorder which affects the inner ear. She explained that the condition sometimes left her disorientated while racing but was not career threatening. In the opening event of the 2017–18 World Cup in Lake Placid, she claimed the bronze medal. She recorded finishes of 23rd, 13th, 16th and 19th at subsequent World Cup events. At the series-ending event in Königssee, Yarnold's final race before the forthcoming Olympics, she finished in fourth place. She finished the World Cup in overall ninth place. Yarnold was then chosen to be the flag bearer for Great Britain at the opening ceremony for the 2018 Winter Olympics.

She arrived at the Games in Pyeongchang suffering from several health concerns. These included a chest infection, which worsened to the point that she was having trouble speaking and breathing, and on the first day of competition she suffered from dizziness due to a flare-up of her vestibular condition. In her event, Yarnold took the lead with a new track record on the first run, but her medical issues left her on the verge of pulling out of the competition. She then fell to third place overall after the second run, one tenth of a second behind overnight leader Lölling. Her health improved for the second day, and she subsequently moved up to second after the third run, two hundredths of a second behind new leader Flock. On the final run, she set another track record to win the gold medal by 0.45 seconds.

She became the first British Winter Olympian to win two gold medals and the first skeleton competitor to defend their Olympic title. She stated after her victory that she had had self-doubts about whether she could get back to where she wanted to be, adding: "Honestly, after the last few years the aim was to get to the Olympics, I wasn't thinking about medals." Her compatriot Laura Deas finished in third position; this marked the first time that Great Britain had ever won two medals in the same event in the history of the Winter Olympics. At the end of 2018, she was nominated for BBC Sports Personality of the Year.

=== Post-Pyeongchang activities and retirement ===
Just weeks after the conclusion of the 2018 Winter Olympics, Yarnold underwent surgery to remove a tumour in her knee which had been discovered six months before the Games. The use of crutches worsened her preexisting back pain, later diagnosed as being the result of two displaced discs. She was left struggling to sit, unable to drive and relied upon powerful painkillers for several months. She subsequently underwent a successful operation on her back in July 2018.

In September 2018, Yarnold stated that she was planning to return to training, but the following month she announced her retirement from the sport. She said that she had lived the dream and desired a fresh challenge. When she ended her career, she was the first and only British Winter Olympian to have won two gold medals. She was also the only skeleton athlete to have won two Olympic gold medals. After retiring, she began mentoring young athletes and working for the British Olympic Association's athlete commission.

Yarnold joined the BBC's coverage of both the 2022 and 2026 Winter Olympics, analysing the skeleton and luge events.

== Personal life ==
On 1 May 2016, Yarnold married her partner James, who worked as a sled designer for the British team. The couple have three daughters. In her spare time she enjoys knitting.

== Honours ==
After winning her first Olympic gold medal in 2014, an open-top bus parade through her hometown of Sevenoaks, Kent was held in her honour. She was appointed Member of the Order of the British Empire (MBE) in the 2014 Birthday Honours for services to skeleton racing. Also that year, she was awarded an honorary doctorate from Canterbury Christ Church University. In the 2018 Queen's Birthday Honours, she was appointed Order of the British Empire (OBE), and later that year, she received an honorary doctorate in science by the University of Kent.

== Career victories ==
=== Winter Olympics ===
Year	Event	Location	Runner-up	Margin	Ref
2014	Winter Olympics	(Russia) Sochi	(United States) Noelle Pikus-Pace	0.97	
2018	Winter Olympics	(South Korea) Pyeongchang	(Germany) Jacqueline Lölling	0.45	

=== World Championships ===
Year	Event	Location	Runner-up	Margin	Ref
2015	World Championships	(Germany) Winterberg	(Germany) Jacqueline Lölling	0.67	

=== European Championships ===
Year	Event	Location	Runner-up	Margin	Ref
2015	European Championships	(Austria) Igls	(Austria) Janine Flock	0.3	

=== World Cup overall ===
Year	Event	Location	Runner-up	Margin	Ref
2013–14	World Cup	Various	(United States) Noelle Pikus-Pace	152 points	

=== World Cup races ===
No.	Season	Round	Date	Location	Margin	Runner-up	Ref
1	2011–12	6	20 January 2012	St. Moritz, Switzerland	0.25	(United Kingdom) Shelley Rudman	
2	2011–12	8	10 February 2012	Calgary, Canada	0.54	(Germany) Anja Huber	
3	2013–14	1	30 November 2013	Calgary, Canada	0.24	(Russia) Elena Nikitina	
4	2013–14	4	15 December 2013	(United States) Lake Placid, USA	0.34	(Austria) Janine Flock	
5	2013–14	5	4 January 2014	Winterberg, Germany	0.57	(United States) Noelle Pikus-Pace	
6	2013–14	7	18 January 2014	Igls, Austria	0.32	(United States) Noelle Pikus-Pace	
7	2014–15	1	13 December 2014	(United States) Lake Placid, USA	0.77	(Canada) Elisabeth Vathje	
8	2014–15	4	16 January 2015	Königssee, Germany	0.71	(Germany) Anja Huber	
9	2014–15	6	7 February 2015	Igls, Austria	0.18	(Canada) Elisabeth Vathje	
10	2014–15	7	8 February 2015	Igls, Austria	0.30	(Austria) Janine Flock	
11	2014–15	8	14 February 2015	Sochi, Russia	0.04	(Russia) Maria Orlova	
