= Roy Martin Haines =

British historian

Roy Martin Haines, FRHistS FSA (1924 – 1 February 2017) was a British historian.

== Early life ==
Haines was the son of Evan George Martin Haines, who served in the Welsh Guards during World War I and died in 1929 aged 32 from an illness attributable to his military service. His mother was Sarah Hilda Haines, née Hall, for more than a quarter of a century the highly respected district nurse and midwife in Catshill, near Bromsgrove: she received the Royal Maundy in 1980 at Worcester.

Between 1932 and 1938 Haines was a pupil at St Michael's Preparatory School, Otford. He then attended Bromsgrove School, which he entered in 1938 as a foundation scholar.

Haines was later educated at St Chad's College in the University of Durham (Gisborne Scholar 1943), where he was admitted to the degrees of BA, MA, and MLitt (1954) (supervised by Professor H. S. Offler), and received a Diploma in Education. While at Durham Haines came into contact with Professor Alexander Hamilton Thompson, whose scholarship was to remain an abiding influence.

== Career ==
Haines returned to his former prep school, St Michael's, as a master from 1947 until 1954. He was responsible for establishing a termly newsletter and later became Chairman of the Old Michaelian Association. Kendall Carey, a pupil at St Michael's from 1949 until 1956, described Haines as "a superb teacher". In addition to the standard curriculum Haines taught heraldry, architecture, and medieval battles, and demonstrated motte-and-bailey castles with sand and matchsticks.

He subsequently studied at Worcester College, Oxford, with the help of a grant from the Chance Educational Trust, eventually gaining a DPhil (1959). Some of his publications were successfully submitted in 2010 for the degree of DLitt of the University of Oxford.

Haines was a history master at Westminster School, where he was later promoted to housemaster of Wren's. He was also Assistant Editor of the Victoria County History of Oxfordshire.

Haines moved to Canada in 1966, first to Mount Allison University, New Brunswick, and then in 1967 to Dalhousie University. He later became Professor of Medieval History at Dalhousie.

In 1978–80 Haines was Canada Council Killam Senior Research Scholar. He spent part of the time at the Vatican Archives. In 1987/8 he was Visiting Fellow of Clare Hall, Cambridge, and was appointed a life member of the college in 1990.

Haines was a Fellow of the Society of Antiquaries of London (elected 2 March 1967) and of the Royal Historical Society. In 1987 he delivered the Bertie Wilkinson Memorial Lecture at the University of Toronto.

== Later life ==
After retiring from Dalhousie Haines returned to the United Kingdom, where he lived in Putney before moving to Curry Rivel in Somerset. He died on 1 February 2017, at the age of 92.

== Personal life ==
In 1957 Haines married Carol Pamela Mary née Dight, an Oxford M.A., and daughter of the late F. H. Dight O.B.E., a meteorologist.

He was the father-in-law of Alexander Jones, FRSC, Professor of the History of the Exact Sciences in Antiquity at the Institute for the Study of the Ancient World and Professor of Mathematics at the Courant Institute of Mathematical Sciences, both at New York University.

== Publications ==
- Archbishop Simon Mepham, 1328–1333: A Boy Amongst Men (Bloomington, Indiana: Xlibris, 2012)
- 'Sumptuous Apparel for a Royal Prisoner: Archbishop Melton's Letter, 14 January 1330', English Historical Review, 124 (2009), 885–94
- 'Roger Mortimer's Scam', Transactions of the Bristol and Gloucestershire Archaeological Society, 126 (2008), 139–56
- 'Wolstan de Bransford OSB, a Fourteenth-Century Prior and Bishop of Worcester, Transactions of the Worcester Archaeological Society, 21 (2008), 179–93
- 'The Stamford Council of April 1327', English Historical Review, 122 (2007), 141–5
- 'Bishop John Stratford's Injunctions to his Cathedral Chapter and to other Benedictine Houses in Winchester', Revue bénédictine, t. 117 (2007), 154–80
- 'The Episcopate during the Reign of Edward II and the Regency of Mortimer and Isabella', Journal of Ecclesiastical History, 56 (2005), 657–709
- 'Sir Thomas Gurney of Englishcombe in the County of Somerset, Regicide?', Somerset Archaeology and Natural History: Proceedings of the Somerset Archaeological and Natural History Society, 147 (2004), 45–65
- King Edward II: Edward of Caernarfon, his life, his reign, and its aftermath, 1284–1330 (Montreal: McGill-Queen's University Press, 2003)
- 'Regular Clergy and the Episcopate in the Provinces of Canterbury and York during the Later Middle Ages', Revue bénédictine, t.105 (2003), 407–47
- Death of a King: An Account of the Supposed Escape and Afterlife of Edward of Caernarvon, formerly Edward II, King of England, Lord of Ireland, Duke of Aquitaine (Scotforth: Scotforth Books, 2002)
- 'Looking Back in Anger: A Politically Inspired Appeal against John XXII's Translation of Bishop Adam Orleton to Winchester (1334), English Historical Review, 116 (2001), 389–404
- 'An Innocent Abroad: the Career of Simon Mepham, Archbishop of Canterbury 1328–1333', English Historical Review, 112 (1997),555-96
- Calendar of the Register of Simon de Montacute Bishop of Worcester, 1334–1337 (Worcestershire Historical Society Series, NS 15; Worcester: Worcestershire Historical Society, 1996)
- 'Bishops and Politics in the Reign of Edward II: Hamo de Hethe, Henry Wharton and the Historia Roffensis', Journal of ecclesiastical history, 44/4 (1993), 586–609
- 'The Episcopate of a Benedictine Monk: Hamo de Hethe, bishop of Rochester (1317–1352)', Revue bénédictine, t. 102 (1992), 192–207
- Ecclesia Anglicana: Studies in the English Church of the Later Middle Ages (Toronto: University of Toronto Press, 1989)
- Archbishop John Stratford: Political Revolutionary and Champion of the Liberties of the English Church ca. 1275/80-1348 (Studies and texts (Pontifical Institute of Mediaeval Studies) 76; Toronto: Pontifical Institute of Mediaeval Studies; Leiden, Netherlands: E.J. Brill, 1986)
- Calendar of the Register of Adam de Orleton Bishop of Worcester, 1327–1333 (Worcestershire Historical Society Series, NS 10/Royal Commission on Historical Manuscripts, joint publication no. 27; London: HMSO, 1979)
- The Church and Politics in Fourteenth-Century England: The Career of Adam Orleton, c. 1275–1345 (Cambridge studies in medieval life and thought, 3rd series, no. 10; Cambridge: Cambridge University Press, 1978)
- A Calendar of the Register of Wolstan de Bransford, Bishop of Worcester, 1339–49 (Worcestershire Historical Society Series, NS 4/Royal Commission on Historical Manuscripts, joint publication no. 9; London: HMSO, 1966)
- The Administration of the Diocese of Worcester in the First Half of the Fourteenth Century (London: Published for the Church Historical Society [by] SPCK, 1965)
- 'Stadhampton', in Victoria County History of Oxfordshire, vii: Dorchester and Thame Hundreds, ed. Mary Lobel (London: Oxford University Press for the Institute of Historical Research, 1962), pp. 81–92
- 'The Administration of the Diocese of Worcester in the First Half of the Fourteenth Century' (University of Oxford DPhil dissertation, 1959)
- 'Bishop Bransford' (University of Durham MLitt dissertation, 1954)
- Articles in Oxford Dictionary of National Biography (of which he was a Research Associate) and Dictionnaire d'histoire et de géographie ecclésiastiques
