= Skeleton at the 2014 Winter Olympics – Women's =

Women's Skeleton at the XXII Olympic Winter Games
- Venue: Sliding Center Sanki
- Dates: 13–14 February 2014
- Competitors: 20 from 12 nations
- Winning time: 3:52.89

Medalists
1st place, gold medalist(s)		Lizzy Yarnold	Great Britain
2nd place, silver medalist(s)		Noelle Pikus-Pace	United States
3rd place, bronze medalist(s)		Elena Nikitina	Russia

The women's skeleton event at the 2014 Winter Olympics took place at the Sliding Center Sanki on 13–14 February. In the first run, Lizzy Yarnold established a track record of 58.43 seconds and the start record of 4.95 seconds. The start record was improved to 4.89 seconds in the same run by Elena Nikitina. In the third run, Yarnold improved her track record to 57.91. Winning all four runs, Yarnold became the Olympic champion; Noelle Pikus-Pace of the United States won silver, and Nikitina became the bronze medalist. Each of them won their first Olympic medal. Yarnold's medal was the first gold medal for Great Britain at the 2014 Olympics.

== Standing records ==
While the IOC does not consider skeleton times eligible for Olympic records, the FIBT does maintain records for both the start and a complete run at each track it competes.

== Results ==
TR – Track Record (in italics for previous marks). Top finish in each run is in boldface. For the second and fourth runs, athletes start in reverse order about their current standings.

On 22 November 2017, bronze medalist Elena Nikitina was stripped of her medal and Olga Potylitsina and Maria Orlova were also disqualified. On 1 February 2018, their results were restored as a result of the successful appeal.

Rank	Bib	Athlete	Country	Run 1	Run 2	Run 3	Run 4	Total	Behind
1st place, gold medalist(s)	2	Lizzy Yarnold	Great Britain	**58.43** TR	**58.46**	**57.91** TR	**58.09**	3:52.89	—
2nd place, silver medalist(s)	1	Noelle Pikus-Pace	United States	58.68 TR	58.65	58.25	58.28	3:53.86	+0.97
3rd place, bronze medalist(s)	12	Elena Nikitina	Russia	58.48	58.96	58.33	58.53	3:54.30	+1.41
4	15	Katie Uhlaender	United States	58.83	58.75	58.41	58.35	3:54.34	+1.45
5	13	Olga Potylitsina	Russia	59.00	58.75	58.13	58.52	3:54.40	+1.51
6	10	Maria Orlova	Russia	58.97	59.02	58.30	58.43	3:54.72	+1.83
7	16	Sarah Reid	Canada	59.14	59.17	58.27	58.15	3:54.73	+1.84
8	5	Anja Huber	Germany	59.17	59.13	58.63	58.31	3:55.24	+2.35
9	4	Janine Flock	Austria	59.47	59.39	58.61	58.56	3:56.03	+3.14
10	8	Sophia Griebel	Germany	59.43	59.20	58.74	58.75	3:56.12	+3.23
11	9	Katharine Eustace	New Zealand	59.52	59.46	58.69	58.54	3:56.21	+3.32
11	17	Mellisa Hollingsworth	Canada	59.68	59.70	58.68	58.15	3:56.21	+3.32
13	6	Marion Thees	Germany	59.25	59.42	58.89	58.67	3:56.23	+3.34
14	11	Michelle Steele	Australia	59.42	59.41	58.76	58.69	3:56.28	+3.39
14	19	Lelde Priedulēna	Latvia	59.73	59.31	58.73	58.51	3:56.28	+3.39
16	3	Shelley Rudman	Great Britain	59.46	59.33	58.82	58.86	3:56.47	+3.58
17	14	Lucy Chaffer	Australia	60.16	59.25	58.74	58.49	3:56.64	+3.75
18	7	Marina Gilardoni	Switzerland	59.77	59.79	58.77	58.41	3:56.74	+3.85
19	18	Nozomi Komuro	Japan	59.94	59.82	59.24	58.76	3:57.76	+4.87
20	20	Maria Marinela Mazilu	Romania	59.99	59.89	59.63	59.11	3:58.62	+5.73
