= St Michael's Prep School, Otford =

Preparatory school in Otford, Kent, England

Coordinates: 51.3127°N 0.2075°E

St Michael's Prep School

Location
- Otford Court; Otford, Kent, TN14 5RY; England

Information
- Type: Preparatory school (United Kingdom)
- Motto: Perseverantia, Sapientia, Gratia
- Established: 1872
- Founder: Arthur Tooth
- Ofsted: Reports
- Chair of Governors: Rashid Chinchanwala
- Head: Nik Pears
- Gender: Mixed
- Age: 2 to 13
- Houses: Dover, Leeds, Rochester, Windsor
- Website: http://www.stmichaels.kent.sch.uk

St Michael's Prep School is a coeducational preparatory school in Otford, located in a 100-acre (400,000 m^{2}) site in the North Downs, Kent, England.

== History ==
St Michael's was founded at Hatcham in 1872 by the Reverend Arthur Tooth as a school and home for the sons of the clergy, naval and military officers as well as professionals who had suffered bereavement or fallen on hard times. The school now has more than 460 pupils.

== Historic abuse allegations ==
In 2005, actor John Hurt stated in an interview with the Independent on Sunday that when he was a pupil at the school he was abused by Donald Cormack, then Senior Master of the school; he later became Head Teacher until his retirement in 1981. Hurt said that the experience affected him "hugely". According to the interviewer, he and Hurt had a mutual friend who had earlier made the same allegations to him.

== Notable alumni ==
=== Teachers ===
- Roy Martin Haines

=== Pupils ===
- Hubert Chesshyre, Clarenceux King of Arms, Secretary of the Order of the Garter,
- John Hurt, actor
- Roy Martin Haines, historian
- Tom Bosworth - represented his country in race walking in the 2010 Commonwealth Games.
- Lizzy Yarnold - silver medallist in the 2011 Bob Skeleton Junior World Championships, 2014 winter Olympic gold medalist, 2018 winter Olympic gold medalist
