= Noelle Pikus-Pace =

American skeleton racer

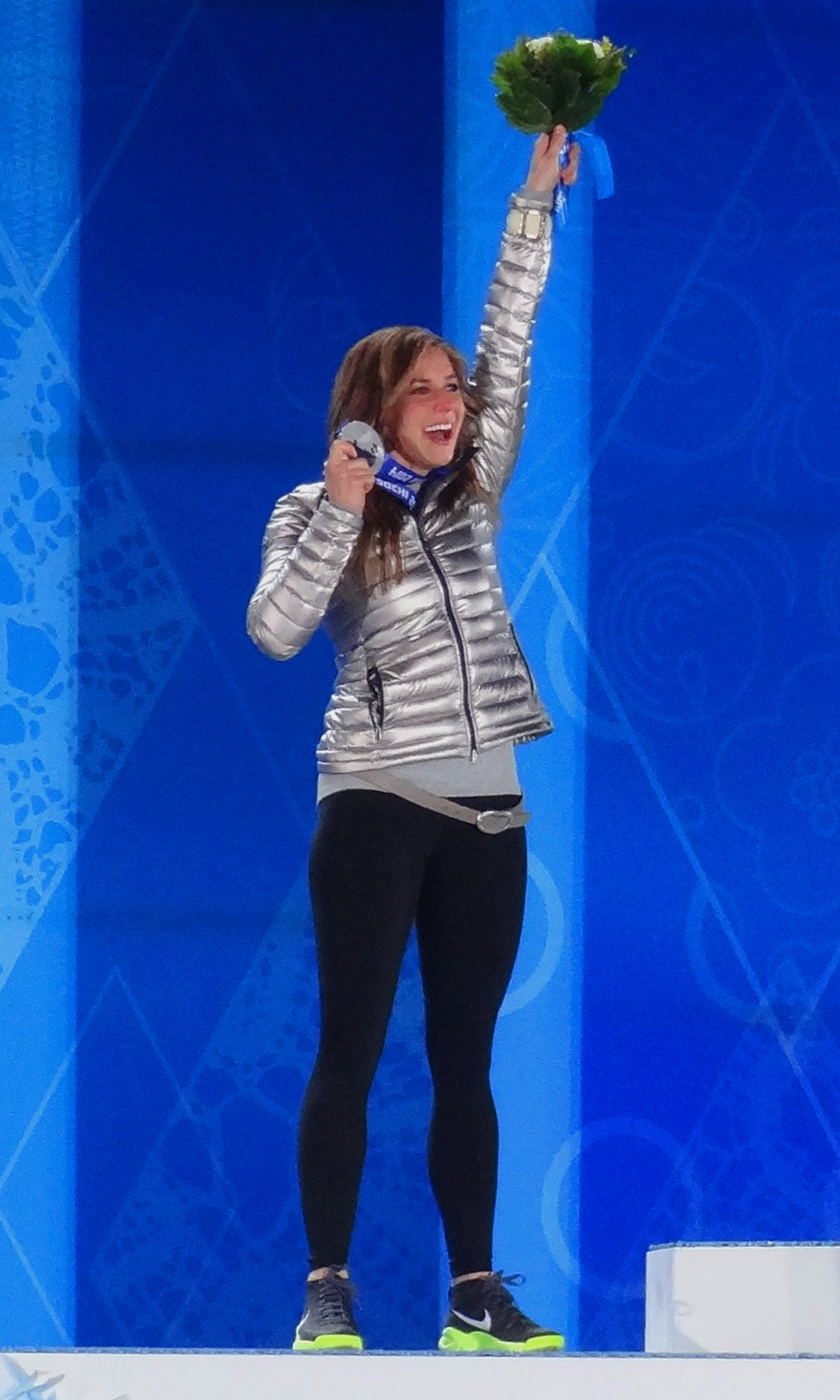

Personal information
- Born: December 8, 1982 (age 43) Provo, Utah, U.S.
- Home town: Eagle Mountain, Utah, U.S.
- Height: 5 ft 10 in (178 cm)
- Weight: 160 lb (73 kg)

Sport
- Country: United States
- Sport: Skeleton
Medal record
Women's Skeleton
Representing the United States
Olympic Games
Silver medal – second place	2014 Sochi	Women
World Championships
Gold medal – first place	2007 St. Moritz	Women
Gold medal – first place	2013 St. Moritz	Mixed team
Silver medal – second place	2005 Calgary	Women
Silver medal – second place	2007 St. Moritz	Mixed team
Silver medal – second place	2013 St. Moritz	Women

Noelle Pikus-Pace (born December 8, 1982) is an American retired skeleton racer who began her career in 2001. She won five medals at the FIBT World Championships, competed in the 2010 Winter Olympics in Vancouver, and won the silver medal in the 2014 Winter Olympics in Sochi.

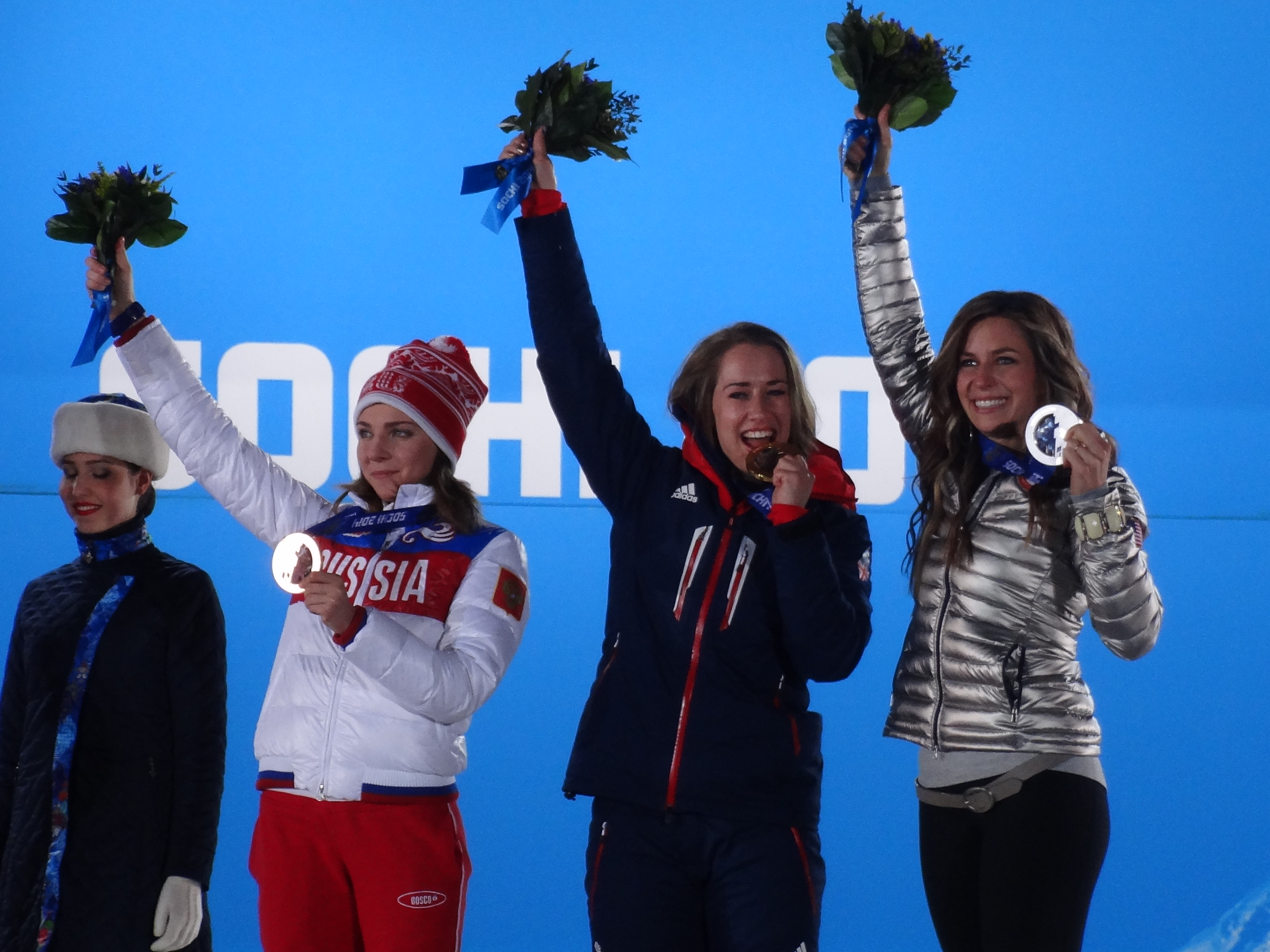
2014 Winter Olympics

== Career ==
Pikus-Pace won the women's Skeleton World Cup overall title in 2004–05.

After winning the silver medal in the women's skeleton event at the 2005 FIBT World Championships in Calgary, Pikus-Pace emerged as one of the favorites to medal at the upcoming Winter Olympics in Turin. Her medal ambitions would be dashed on October 19, 2005 at the Canada Olympic Park bobsleigh, luge, and skeleton track in Calgary when her right leg was broken by a four-man bobsleigh that failed to brake at the finish line. The bobsleigh ejected out of the end of the track and hit Pikus-Pace and teammate Lea Ann Parsley, narrowly missing three other team members. Pikus-Pace underwent surgery to repair her broken leg, which included an insertion of a titanium rod into her leg. She would return to competition seven weeks later at Igls, Austria, finishing 20th. She would chronicle her comeback from the 2005 freak accident which prevented her participation in Turin. This story was told in the critically acclaimed documentary 114 Days: The Race to Save a Dream. The US Bobsleigh and Skeleton Federation petitioned to both the FIBT and the IOC to include Pikus-Pace in the women's skeleton competition, but to no avail. The only American representative in women's skeleton was Katie Uhlaender who finished sixth.

Pikus-Pace, who at the time was six weeks pregnant, announced on October 3, 2007 that she would take the 2007–08 Skeleton World Cup off to give birth to her baby.

She finished fifth in the 2008-09 Skeleton World Cup season opener in Winterberg, Germany on November 28, 2008.

It was announced on January 17, 2010 that Pikus-Pace had qualified for the 2010 Winter Olympics. She competed in the 2010 Games, finishing in fourth place, with a sled designed by her husband after two of her other sleds had been damaged. The first sled had been damaged by the runaway bobsled in Calgary and her second sled was damaged during transport to the FIBT World Championships 2009 in Lake Placid, New York. Pikus-Pace's husband, a project manager of a metal fabrication company in South Salt Lake, Utah, designed a skeleton sled in accordance to FIBT regulations to allow her to race.

== Retirement and return to skeleton ==
Pikus-Pace retired after the conclusion of the 2010 Winter Olympics. She announced her intention to come out of retirement in the summer of 2012 with the intent of qualifying for the 2014 Winter Olympics.

On January 11, 2013, Pikus-Pace placed first in her event at the Königssee, Germany track. This win was her first on the World Cup level since 2004.

She would build upon this breakthrough by helping Team USA-1 win gold in the team event at the FIBT World Championships 2013 in St. Moritz, Switzerland. Her 1:08:92 time vaulted the team into the lead and was 0.84 seconds quicker than the other competitors who sleighed her leg of the event. Pikus-Pace would then go on to win silver in the women's event.

She closed the 2012/13 FIBT World Cup season with a win in Sochi. On January 18, 2014, Pikus-Pace was named to the 2014 Olympic team. On February 14, 2014, Pikus-Pace won her first Olympic medal, a silver, coming full circle and completing her comeback before retiring for good.

== Personal life ==
Pikus-Pace is the youngest of the eight children in her family. She married her husband, Janson Pace, in 2002. The couple welcomed their first child, daughter Lacee Lynne Pace, on January 19, 2008. They also have a son named Traycen. In an interview on NBC on February 14, 2014, after winning the silver medal in the Olympics in Sochi, she revealed that she had a miscarriage at 18 weeks while carrying her third child. Pikus-Pace said the pain of this loss and her difficulties coping with it caused her husband to encourage her to get back into the sport and compete in skeleton again. In July 2015 she gave birth to twins Payton and Makai. She is a native of Eagle Mountain, Utah.

She is a member of the Church of Jesus Christ of Latter-day Saints. Throughout the Olympics in Sochi, she wore a medallion she earned in the church's young woman program.
