= Rzhanaya Polyana =

Natural area in Krasnodar Krai, Russia

Rzhanaya Polyana (Russian: Ржаная Поляна) is a natural area in Krasnodar Krai, Russia, located not far from Krasnaya Polyana.

Home of the Sliding Center Sanki, it hosted bobsleigh, luge, and skeleton events for the 2014 Winter Olympics held in Sochi.
