= 2018 BBC Sports Personality of the Year Award =

Sports award in the UK

BBC Sports Personality of the Year 2018
- Date: 16 December 2018
- Location: Resorts World Arena, Birmingham
- Country: United Kingdom
- Presented by: BBC
- Hosted by: Gary Lineker; Clare Balding; Gabby Logan
- Winner: Geraint Thomas
- Website: BBC Sports Personality

Television/radio coverage
- Network: BBC One; BBC One HD; BBC Radio 5 Live
- Runtime: 130 minutes

The BBC Sports Personality of the Year 2018 took place on 16 December 2018 at the Resorts World Arena in Birmingham. It was the 65th presentation of the BBC Sports Personality of the Year Award.

The event, broadcast live on BBC One, was hosted by Gary Lineker, Clare Balding and Gabby Logan.

Des Clarke and Jazmin Sawyers provided the pre-show entertainment. George Ezra, Paloma Faith and Freya Ridings performed during the show. The Lightning Seeds along with David Baddiel and Frank Skinner performed "Three Lions" whilst a montage of England's run to the football World Cup semi final was played.

== Nominees ==
The nominees for the award were revealed during the ceremony.

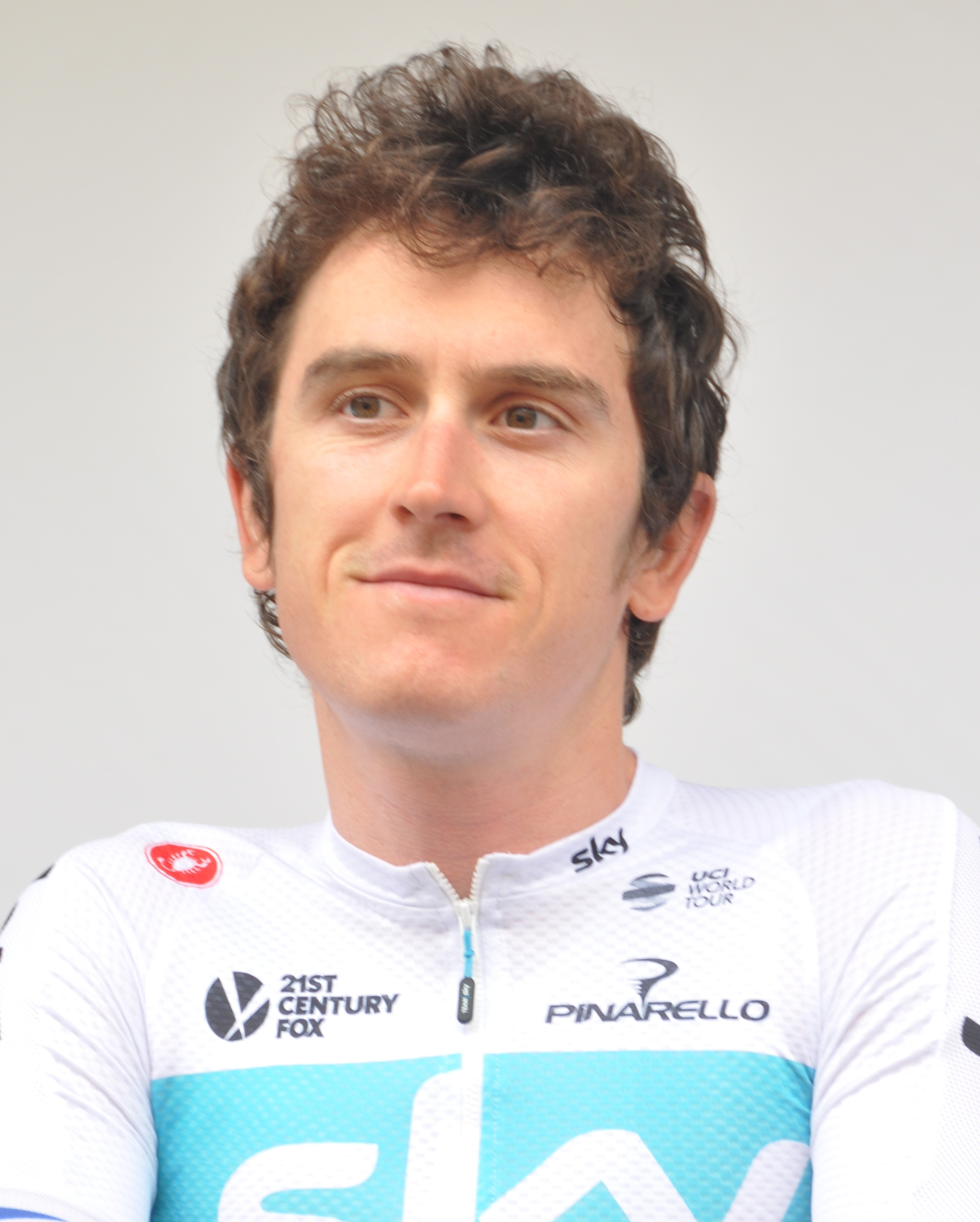
Geraint Thomas was announced as the Sports Personality of the year 2018.

Nominee	Sport	2018 Achievement
Geraint Thomas	Cycling	Became the first Welshman (and third Briton) to claim a Grand Tour victory upon winning the Tour de France.
Lewis Hamilton	Formula 1	Became just the third driver (after Michael Schumacher and Juan Manuel Fangio) to win a fifth World Drivers' Championship.
Harry Kane	Football	Served as England captain in the FIFA World Cup, where he led the squad to a fourth-place finish and scored 6 goals (including a hat trick against Panama) to win the Golden Boot.
Dina Asher-Smith	Athletics	Secured a hat trick of European titles with world leading times in the 100 metres, 200 metres and 4×100 metres relay (the first two were also British records).
Lizzy Yarnold	Skeleton	Became the first competitor (man or woman) to successfully defend an Olympic skeleton title, as well as the first British Olympian to successfully defend a title in any winter Olympic sport.
James Anderson	Cricket	Became the most prolific pace bowler in Test history upon securing his 564th wicket with the final ball of the England v India Test series.

== Other awards ==
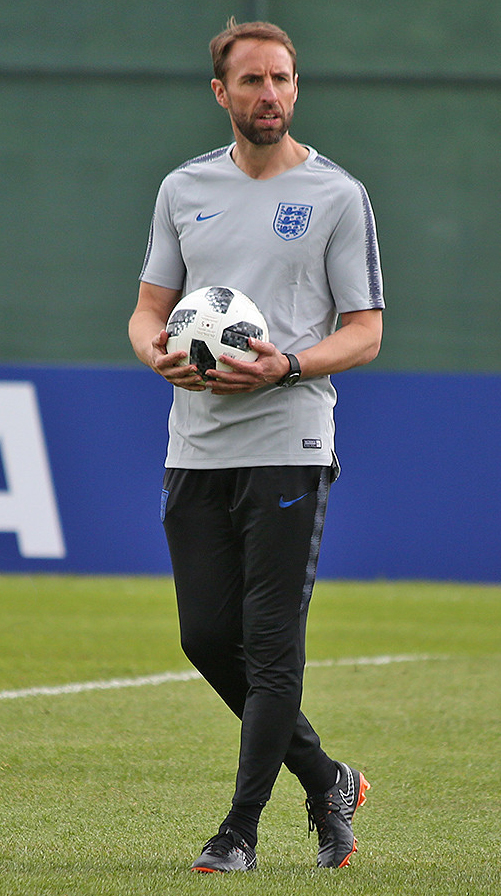
Gareth Southgate won the coach of the year award.

In addition to the main award as "Sports Personality of the Year", several other awards will also be presented:

- BBC Sports Personality of the Year Coach Award: Gareth Southgate
- BBC Sports Unsung Hero Award: Kirsty Ewen

=== BBC Sports Personality Greatest Sporting Moment of the Year ===
On 3 December 2018 the nominees for the inaugural Greatest sporting moment of the year were announced. The winner was decided by public vote (online only) between the 3 December 2018 at 18.30 GMT and 14 December 2018 at 20.00 GMT. It was announced that the England national netball team's last second win over Australia for the Commonwealth Games title had been voted sporting moment of the year.

- England's historic netball gold
- England win penalty shootout
- Alastair Cook's farewell century
- Tiger Woods' first win in five years
- Tyson Fury fights back from knockdowns

=== BBC Sports Personality World Sport Star of the Year ===
Formerly known as the BBC Overseas Sports Personality of the Year, the nominees for the award were announced on 3 December. People from outside of the UK could participate in the voting for the first time. Voting took place online between the 3 December 2018 at 15:00 GMT and 15 December 2018 at 14:00 GMT. The winner was Italian golfer, Francesco Molinari.

Nominee	Nationality	Sport	2018 Achievement
Simone Biles	United States	Gymnastics	Won six medals at the 2018 World Championships, a total which included four golds. She won a record breaking 4th all around title despite suffering from a kidney stone and being in hospital the day before the meeting began. She is the first gymnast to win every event at the national championships since 1994.
Ester Ledecká	Czech Republic	Skiing and Snowboarding	First woman to win two Winter Olympic titles in different sports at the same games.
Francesco Molinari	Italy	Golf	Won the Open Championship and all five Ryder Cup matches that he played in. In addition he won for the first time on the PGA tour and took the European Tour Race to Dubai crown.
Oleksandr Usyk	Ukraine	Boxing	Unified the WBO and WBC cruiserweight titles against Mairis Briedis before adding the WBA, IBF and The Ring Magazine belts to his collection after defeating Murat Gassiev. He finished the year by defeating Tony Bellew to defend the titles.

=== BBC Sports Personality Team of the Year ===
The Nominations for Team of the year were announced on the night of the ceremony. The nominees were:

- England Football
- Ireland Rugby Union
- Celtic F.C.
- England Netball
- European Ryder Cup
- Manchester City F.C.
- Mercedes F1
- Team Sky

England Netball team was announced as the winners of the team of the year award.

=== BBC Sports Personality Lifetime Achievement Award ===
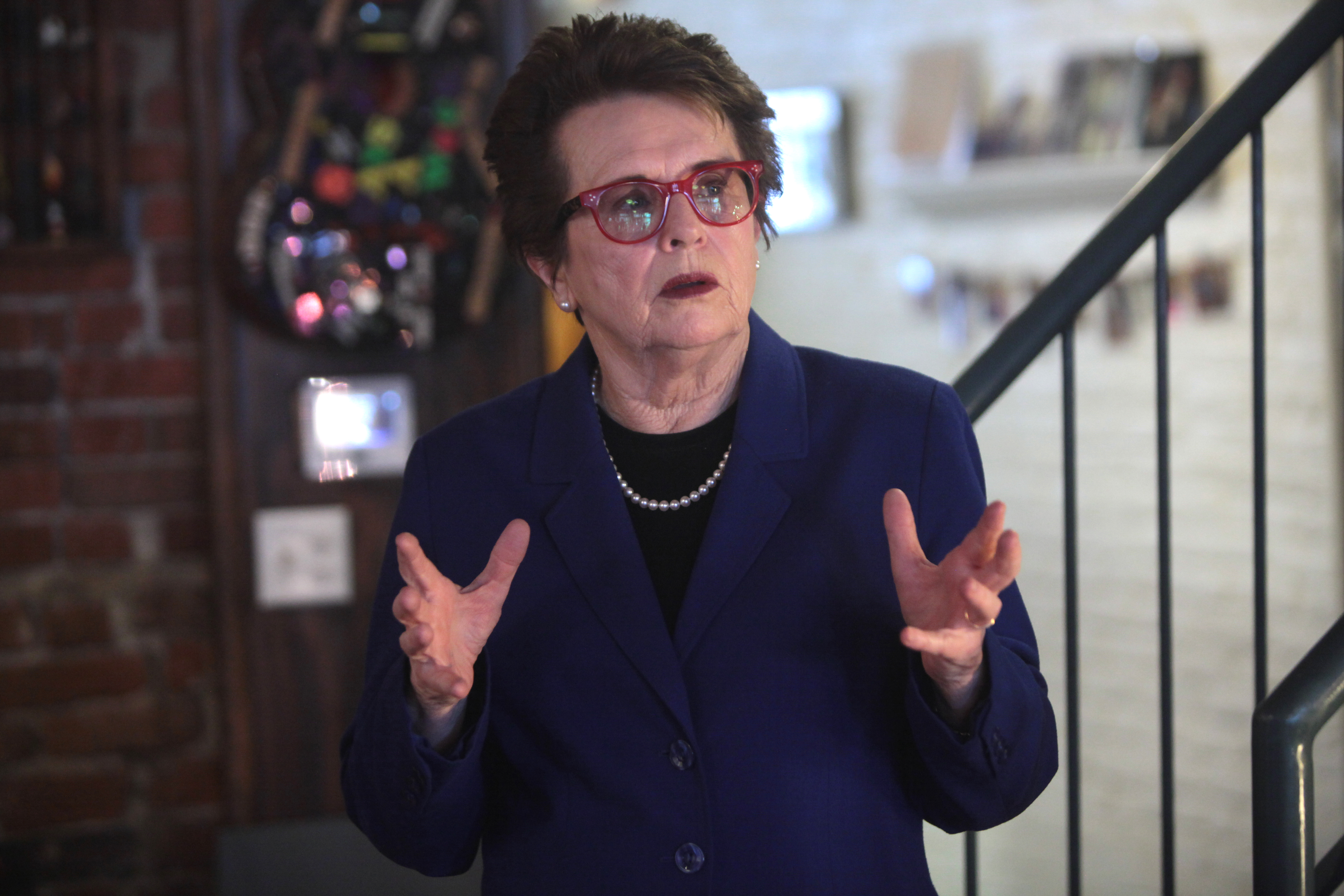
Billie Jean King became only the third woman to be given the lifetime achievement award.

Billie Jean King became the third woman and third tennis player to be given the Lifetime achievement award. King had won 39 Grand Slam titles in both singles and doubles competitions throughout her career, with 20 coming at Wimbledon. In 1961 King and Karen Hantze Susman became the youngest pair to win the women's doubles title at Wimbledon. Throughout her career King was world singles number one in six years and won 129 singles titles in total, with the very last one coming in Birmingham where the award was presented. King also won 7 Fed Cup titles as a player and a further 4 as a captain. Away from the court King founded the Women's Tennis Association and was an advocate of gender equality defeating Bobby Riggs in the Battle of the Sexes match. King was inducted into the Tennis Hall of Fame in 1987 and was given the Presidential Medal of Freedom in 2009. King used her speech to remind people to continue to influence and inspire others.

=== BBC Young Sports Personality of the Year ===
The original 10 were shortlisted to Adenegan, Anderson and Bowen. At the BBC Radio 1 Teen Awards in October 2018 it was announced that Kare Adenegan had won the award.

Nominee	Sport	2018 Achievement
Kare Adenegan	Wheelchair racing	Became T34 100m WPA European champion and 100m world record holder. Beat Hannah Cockroft for the first time when setting the world record.
Freya Anderson	Swimming	
James Bowen	Horse racing	
Max Burgin	Athletics	
Jack Draper	Tennis	
Georgia-Mae Fenton	Gymnastics	
Anna Hursey	Table tennis	
Georgia Roche	Rugby league	
Ryan Sessegnon	Football	
Maisie Summers-Newton	Para-swimming	

=== Helen Rollason award ===
The Helen Rollason award was given to racing driver Billy Monger. Monger had both his legs amputated after an accident during a Formula 4 race in April 2017. He returned to racing in March 2018 in the British Formula 3 Championship (F3). He took his first pole position in F3 upon his return to the scene of the accident. Monger finished sixth overall in the championship, with three podium finishes and another pole position to his name.

== In Memoriam ==
- Roger Bannister
- Peter Thomson Celia Barquin Arozamena
- Alan Oakman John Murray
- Kevin Beattie Paul Madeley
- Bob Matthews Matt Campbell
- Mick O'Toole John Dunlop
- Neale Cooper Alan Gilzean
- Maria Bueno
- Enzo Calzaghe Brendan Ingle
- Jimmy McIlroy Roy Bentley
- Carol Mann Anne Donovan Celia Brackenridge
- Ray Wilson
- Norman Sheil Paul Sherwen
- Geoff Gunney Harold Poynton Cliff Watson
- Ray Wilkins
- Jimmy Armfield
- Scott Westgarth Dean Francis Chris Edwards
- Mike Tucker Tim Stockdale
- Ian Williams John Mantle Harry Walker
- Liam Miller Jlloyd Samuel Davide Astori
- Eric Bristow
- Paul Alcock Doug Ellis
- Angus Black Gareth Williams Haydn Morgan
- Albert Sewell Peter Brackley
- William Dunlop Dan Kneen Adam Lyon
- Ellie Soutter Tazmin Pugh
- Cyrille Regis
