= Skeleton at the 2018 Winter Olympics – Women's =

Women's Skeleton at the XXIII Olympic Winter Games
- Venue: Alpensia Sliding Centre
- Dates: 16–17 February 2018
- Competitors: 20 from 14 nations
- Winning time: 3:27.28

Medalists
| 1st place, gold medalist(s) | | Lizzy Yarnold | Great Britain |
| 2nd place, silver medalist(s) | | Jacqueline Lölling | Germany |
| 3rd place, bronze medalist(s) | | Laura Deas | Great Britain |

The women's skeleton event at the 2018 Winter Olympics took place on 16 and 17 February at the Alpensia Sliding Centre near Pyeongchang, South Korea.

== Summary ==
The defending champion, Lizzy Yarnold had struggled in the season leading to the Games, but set a new track record in the first run. Affected by the middle ear disorder which had impeded her season, she had a mediocre second run, but a strong slide brought her back to second, and only two hundredths of a second off gold after the third run. In the fourth run, she established a significant new track record, thereby becoming the first double Olympic champion (male or female) in the history of skeleton, and the first multiple woman medalist. Jacqueline Lölling was consistent throughout the event to come second, and Laura Deas came in third. For both of them, these were the first Olympic medals.

Janine Flock, leading after three runs despite never being better than third in any single run, and placed under pressure by Yarnold's hot final run, had a mediocre last run, which took her out of the podium entirely.

Simidele Adeagbo was the first athlete representing Nigeria at the Winter Olympics.

== Qualification ==
20 athletes qualified. Qualification is based on the combined rankings (across all four tours) as of 14 January 2018. The top two countries received three quotas each, the next four received two each and the last six were awarded to six countries. The Netherlands rejected one of its two quotas. Women had to be ranked in the top 45, after eliminating non-quota-earning competitors from countries that have earned their maximum quota. Nigeria was awarded the continental quota for Africa, while Australia received the Oceania quota. South Korea qualified as host nation.

Competitors must compete in five races on three tracks during the 2016/17 season or 2017/18 season.

== Results ==
The first two runs were held on 16 February and the last two on 17 February 2018.

TR – Track Record (in italics for previous marks). Top finish in each run is in boldface. For the second and fourth runs, athletes start in reverse order in relation to their current standings.

| Rank | Bib | Athlete | Country | Run 1 | Rank 1 | Run 2 | Rank 2 | Run 3 | Rank 3 | Run 4 | Rank 4 | Total | Behind |
|---|---|---|---|---|---|---|---|---|---|---|---|---|---|
| 1st place, gold medalist(s) | 14 | Lizzy Yarnold | Great Britain | **51.66** TR | 1 | 52.30 | 9 | 51.86 | 2 | **51.46** TR | 1 | 3:27.28 | – |
| 2nd place, silver medalist(s) | 7 | Jacqueline Lölling | Germany | 51.74 TR | 2 | 52.12 | 4 | 52.04 | 7 | 51.83 | 3 | 3:27.73 | +0.45 |
| 3rd place, bronze medalist(s) | 10 | Laura Deas | Great Britain | 52.00 | 6 | 52.03 | 2 | 51.96 | 5 | 51.91 | 5 | 3:27.90 | +0.62 |
| 4 | 9 | Janine Flock | Austria | 51.81 | 3 | 52.07 | 3 | 51.92 | 4 | 52.12 | 10 | 3:27.92 | +0.64 |
| 5 | 6 | Tina Hermann | Germany | 51.98 TR | 4 | 52.31 | 10 | **51.83** | 1 | 51.86 | 4 | 3:27.98 | +0.70 |
| 6 | 8 | Anna Fernstädt | Germany | 51.99 | 5 | 52.17 | 5 | 51.88 | 3 | 52.00 | 6 | 3:28.04 | +0.76 |
| 7 | 13 | Lelde Priedulēna | Latvia | 52.14 | 7 | 52.17 | 5 | 52.09 | 9 | 52.09 | 8 | 3:28.49 | +1.21 |
| 8 | 17 | Kimberley Bos | Netherlands | 52.33 | 8 | 52.26 | 7 | 51.99 | 6 | 52.01 | 7 | 3:28.59 | +1.31 |
| 9 | 4 | Elisabeth Vathje | Canada | 52.45 TR | 12 | **52.01** | 1 | 52.37 | 14 | 51.82 | 2 | 3:28.65 | +1.37 |
| 10 | 5 | Jane Channell | Canada | 52.42 TR | 11 | 52.28 | 8 | 52.28 | 10 | 52.09 | 8 | 3:29.07 | +1.79 |
| 11 | 16 | Marina Gilardoni | Switzerland | 52.34 | 10 | 52.35 | 12 | 52.28 | 10 | 52.46 | 13 | 3:29.43 | +2.15 |
| 12 | 11 | Mirela Rahneva | Canada | 52.48 | 14 | 52.33 | 11 | 52.06 | 8 | 52.65 | 15 | 3:29.52 | +2.24 |
| 13 | 12 | Katie Uhlaender | United States | 52.33 | 8 | 52.40 | 13 | 52.33 | 12 | 52.55 | 14 | 3:29.61 | +2.33 |
| 14 | 15 | Kim Meylemans | Belgium | 52.56 | 16 | 52.54 | 14 | 52.34 | 13 | 52.26 | 11 | 3:29.70 | +2.42 |
| 15 | 2 | Jeong Sophia | South Korea | 52.47 TR | 13 | 52.67 | 15 | 52.47 | 15 | 52.28 | 12 | 3:29.89 | +2.61 |
| 16 | 19 | Jaclyn Narracott | Australia | 52.53 | 15 | 52.76 | 16 | 52.62 | 17 | 52.82 | 17 | 3:30.73 | +3.45 |
| 17 | 18 | Kendall Wesenberg | United States | 52.77 | 17 | 52.96 | 17 | 52.54 | 16 | 52.65 | 15 | 3:30.92 | +3.64 |
| 18 | 1 | Maria Marinela Mazilu | Romania | 53.31 | 18 | 53.47 | 19 | 53.48 | 18 | 53.66 | 19 | 3:33.92 | +6.64 |
| 19 | 3 | Takako Oguchi | Japan | 53.82 | 19 | 53.41 | 18 | 53.62 | 19 | 53.11 | 18 | 3:33.96 | +6.68 |
| 20 | 20 | Simidele Adeagbo | Nigeria | 54.19 | 20 | 54.58 | 20 | 53.73 | 20 | 54.28 | 20 | 3:36.78 | +9.50 |

TR – Track Record.
