= Thomas Hudson (pentathlete) =

British modern pentathlete

Personal information
- Born: 15 December 1935
- Died: 19 December 2023 (aged 88)

Sport
- Sport: Modern pentathlon

Thomas Hudson (15 December 1935 – 19 December 2023) was a British modern pentathlete. He competed at the 1956 Summer Olympics.
