= Sliding Center Sanki =

Sports venue in Rzhanaya Polyana, Russia

Coordinates: 43°40′01″N 40°17′19″E

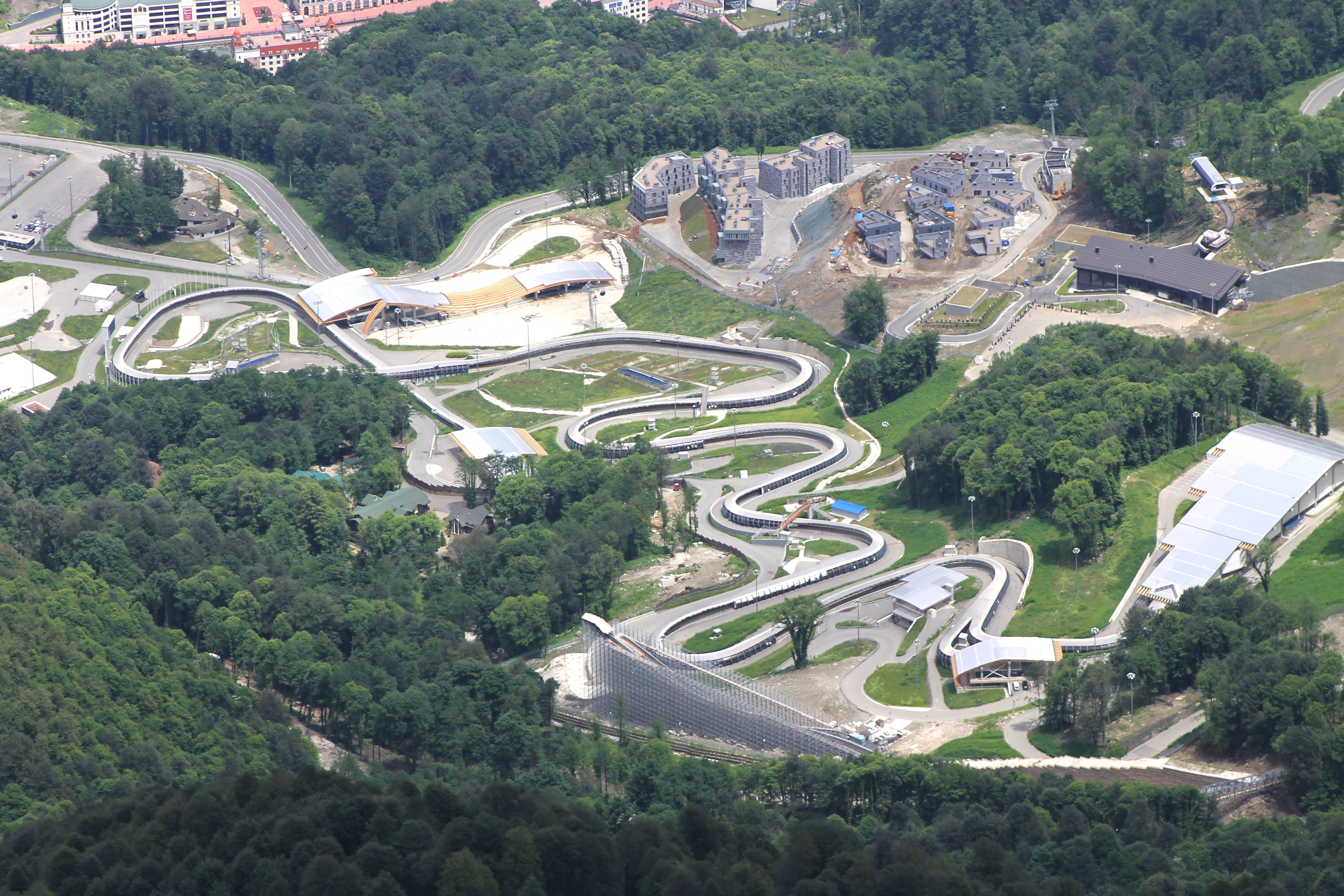
Sliding Center Sanki in Krasnaya Polyana. View from peak top Black pyramid

The Sliding Center Sanki (Санки) (a.k.a. the Sanki Sliding Center) is a bobsleigh, luge, and skeleton track located in Rzhanaya Polyana, Russia, 60 km (37 mi) northeast of Sochi. Located in the Western Caucasus. The venue hosted the bobsleigh, luge, and skeleton events for the 2014 Winter Olympics.

== History ==
In 2006, it was announced that Russia would construct two new bobsleigh, luge, and skeleton tracks. The first track was located near Moscow while the second one would be located in Krasnaya Polyana. Sochi was chosen to host the 2014 Winter Olympics over Pyeongchang, South Korea and Salzburg, Austria on 4 July 2007. By 2009, the location was changed to Rzhanaya Polyana, located not far from Krasnaya Polyana. On 26 April 2016, a fire damaged part of the track.

== Track ==
The track length is 1365 meters for bobsleigh, skeleton, and men's singles luge and 1325 meters for luge – women's singles and men's doubles, with the finish height being at 1215 meters above sea level. It features 19 curves for bobsleigh and skeleton, 20 turns for men's singles luge, and 17 turns for luge – women's singles/men's doubles. The maximum height difference (in the 1365m configuration) is 131.9 meters. The track will have permanent seating of 500, a temporary seating of 500, and a standing room crowd of 10,000 during the 2014 games. In their Olympic bid package, Sochi's track would cost RUB 135.7 million.

Post-Olympic usage involves international bobsleigh, luge, and skeleton competitions and training for Russian athletes involved in those sports.

== Controversies ==
Construction was scheduled to begin in 2007 and run until 2009 with testing events approved by the International Bobsleigh and Tobogganing Federation (FIBT) and the FIL in 2013 and 2014. There have been two issues with the track regarding location.

=== Downhill grades ===
Seven different locations were submitted to both the FIBT and FIL, but have all been rejected due to high downhill grades on the track. The joint track commission of the FIBT-FIL expressed concerns over this issue. The head of the Königssee bobsleigh, luge, and skeleton track in Germany stated that "the FIL is not to blame for the problems occurring in connection with the track location."

=== World Heritage Site proximity ===
The site where the track would be located has been under fire from Greenpeace Russia over its location near the World Heritage Site of the Western Caucasus. Following Greenpeace Russia's official examination of the facility near the Sochi National Park, it was determined that about ten other places could be used outside of the park for track construction. Controversy about the track also included the Northern Caucasus brown bear's location near the track for which the bear is an endangered species.

=== Resolution ===
Both issues were resolved after FIL President Josef Fendt expressed his support along with an International Olympic Committee (IOC) visit in Sochi on 21 May 2009.
